= The Great War in Europe =

1994 WWI wargame

- The cover of Command #33, containing The Great War in Europe
- Designers: Ted Raicer
- Illustrators: Beth Queman
- Publishers: XTR Corp
- Publication: 1995
- Genres: World War I

The Great War in Europe is a board wargame published by XTR Corporation in 1995 that simulates the European theaters of World War I. Despite being published in a magazine, the game won a Charles S. Roberts Award.

== Description ==
The Great War in Europe is a board wargame for 2 players, where one player controls Allied forces, while the other controls Central Power forces.

=== Components ===
The game box includes 1200 counters, a rulebook, various player aids, and two 22" x 33" hex grid maps, one representing the Eastern Front, and the other the Western Front. The two maps have different scales, and are not designed to be joined.

=== Gameplay ===
The game uses a simple "I Go, You Go" sequence, where one player moves, attacks, and checks supply, followed by the other player. Where this differs from other games is that while Player A is taking a turn on the Eastern Front board, Player B is taking a turn on the Western Front board. At the end of their respective turns, the players switch boards, except if the Central Powers player chooses to force play to continue on the same boards for another turn.

During the reinforcement phase, the Allies must place their reinforcements on the boards first, allowing the Central Powers player the strategic advantage of seeing where strong and weak points have been created.

=== Supply ===
In errata supplied after the game was published, units cannot move beyond the range of their supply.

=== Special events ===
There are three dozen special events such as "Mustard Gas", "Air Aces" and "Typhus". These counters are grouped together chronologically, and at specific times during the game, they are placed in the Special Events Pool. When a player uses a Resource Point, they also draw a Special Events counter and either use it or act upon it.

=== Strategy ===
Critic John Kisner thought that attrition was the main focus of this game, pointing out "By applying unrelenting pressure to a foe you sense is being weakened, the long-range goal may eventually be reached: that nation's collapse and withdrawal from the war. The strategic imperative is therefore to effect a concentration of overwhelming force on one front while maintaining a barely adequate defense on the other."

== Publication history ==
The Great War in Europe was designed by Ted Raicer, with cartography by Beth Queman. It was offered as a free pull-out game by XTR Corporation in Issue 33 of their house magazine Command (March–April 1995). XTR also sold it by mail-order packaged in a plastic bag.

A major complaint that surfaced immediately after publication is that the game was unbalanced in favor of the Central Powers, who could send their units rampaging over Europe with no regard to being supplied. XTR quickly issued an errata that all units cannot move out of supply.

Shortly after publication, XTR released an expansion titled The Great War in the Near East.

In 2002, Kokusai-Tsushin Co., Ltd. (国際通信社) published a Japanese-language version of the game.

In 2007, GMT Games published a boxed set that incorporated the Eastern, Western and Near East campaigns, titled The Great War in Europe: Deluxe Edition, featuring cover art by Rodger B. MacGowan and interior art by Mark Simonitch.

== Reception ==
In Issue 91 of the British wargaming magazine Perfidious Albion, Charles Vasey wrote, "I regret to say seldom have I wasted so much time to so little good purpose. The result may be playable, but it is not the Great War as I recognise it. I heartily recommend you avoid the game." In the next issue, Vasey went into more detail, pointing out that no towns worth victory points in the Lorraine region between France and Germany, the Allied player tended to shift French units north to Belgium, where victory points abound. Vasey called the ahistorical effect of this "a load of tosh." Vasey did find the game had "size, simplicity and situation", but felt that it did not simulate the war very well, writing, "The system is still not grasping World War I strategy."

In Issue 16 of Berg's Review of Games, Richard Berg found the rules to be badly organized, writing, "in terms of organization - the sheer task of finding stuff - [the rules] could be the worst ever done by XTR." Berg also questioned the historicity of the game, commenting, "The game is fully enjoyable - actually very enjoyable ... But while you are enjoying it, you must remember that Great War was designed for fun and amusement; it is not a definitive dissection of WWI." Despite these problems, Berg concluded, "[The game] does what few others do, pulling you into its world, forcing you to play the situation, not the rules. Like all beauties, it has a mole or two, none of which detract from its overall aura. Ted Raicer's Great War in Europe should be the trendsetter for several years to come. This could end up a flagship of the XTR line, it's that good."

In Issue 5 of Zone of Control, John W. Kisner found that although the rules were relatively simple, the game itself was very slow, noting one game lasting three months (30+ hours) only completed half of the 50 turns. "The torpid pace seems a function of the number of turns, the number of units in play (1200 counters are provided, mostly combat divisions), and the stacking density (continuous lines, often six counters per hex where a 'big push' is taking place)." Kisner concluded by giving this game grades of "Excellent" for gameplay and "Fair" for historicity, noting, "Great War is a great game. [Designer] Racier's heroic effort to make trench-fighting fun has cost the design some operational realism, but the game's powerful strategic narrative more than atones. ... Great War's excessive size and length will limit enjoyment to a select few, but for them an intriguing experience awaits.

== Awards ==
At the 1995 Charles S. Roberts Awards, The Great War in Europe won in the category "Best Pre-World War II Board Game".
