= BattleLore =

Board game

- Players: 2 players
- Setup time: 10 minutes
- Playing time: 30–60 minutes
- Chance: Medium
- Skills: Dice Rolling, Hand Management

BattleLore is a strategy board wargame for two players, created by Richard Borg and initially published by Days of Wonder in 2006 (and later by Fantasy Flight Games). The game is based on the same mechanics as Battle Cry, Memoir '44 and Commands & Colors: Ancients, but has a fantasy and medieval theme.

BattleLore debuted at the 2006 Spiel game fair in Essen, Germany and was released worldwide on November 30 of that year.

Typical setup for a game is 10–15 minutes. Beginning players can expect a 45-60 minute duration game, but experienced players can usually finish a game in about 30–45 minutes. Each player has a set of quick reference cards to help them keep rules in mind. Experienced players will rarely have to pull out the rulebook for clarification. The scenario book that comes with the basic box is organised as a tutorial sequence that introduces concepts one adventure at a time, making the game very easy to learn.

Each adventure in Battlelore is pre-constructed, leaving the work of creating armies to the scenario author. Although with the Call to Arms Expansion (released May 2007) the players have (limited) control on deploying units to any given scenario. The Battlelore website offers an online scenario builder that helps fans create their own adventures.

In September 2008 Fantasy Flight Games and Days of Wonder announced that the game would be moving to Fantasy Flight Games, along with all remaining stock.

In 2013, a revised version, BattleLore Second Edition, was released by Fantasy Flight Games.

== Gameplay summary ==
The player starts the game by choosing a scenario. Scenarios are available from the manual, the Internet, or can be designed players. The terrain and starting positions are laid out according to the scenario. The battlefield is divided into three sections by two red dotted lines, giving each player a left flank, a center and a right flank section. Troops are commanded by playing a command card. Command cards are used to order troops to move, battle and/or execute a special command. There are two types of command cards: Section cards and Tactic cards. Section cards are used to order a move and/or battle in a specific section. These cards indicate in which section(s) of the battlefield the player may order units and how many units may be ordered. Tactic cards allow players to make special moves, battle in a specific way or take special actions, as explained on the card.

The object of the game is to be the first to destroy a set number of enemy units (usually 4 to 6, depending on the selected battle scenario's victory conditions). In some scenarios, additional banners may be gained from the board map itself, for capturing and holding certain terrain hexes or battlefield objectives.

== Expansions and Promotional Figures ==
Days of Wonder first planned to release a large expansion every six months and 1 or 2 small expansions every month. The first two additions were the Hill Giant, that was available to those who pre-ordered the game and at gaming events and conventions, and the Earth Elemental that was available for a limited time, for free, for anyone who purchased the game.

The first expansion - Battlelore Epic - contains rules for large-scale battles and for multiplayer games of up to 6 people. Epic Battlelore is played on two boards adjacent to each other forming one double-sided battlefield. It was first published as a set of rules available for download but in June 2007 it was published and sold with an extra board and tokens. The second expansion, Call to Arms, contains rules to draft customized armies.

Four additional expansions were released in 2007: Dwarven Battalion, Scottish Wars, Goblin Skirmishers, Goblin Marauders and The Hundred Years' War - Crossbows & Polearms. Labelled as specialist-packs, they included new miniatures with unique rules and scenarios. Days of Wonder had planned for the Heroes of Battlelore expansion, to be released in 2008 but the expansion was delayed when the game was sold to Fantasy Flight Games. Fantasy Flight Games released the long-delayed Heroes expansion in October 2009. It introduced an element of role-play to the game, whereby Heroes gradually grow in power by participating in (and surviving) a series of adventures. Heroes eventually "retire" to become an addition to the player's Battle Council.

Heroes was soon followed by Dragons (Wood Wyvern, Ice Drake, and Fire Dragon) in January 2010 and Creatures (Wood Giant, Hydra, and Rock Elemental) in February. The Horrific Horde Goblin army pack was released in June 2010.

Upcoming expansions announced so far are the Bearded Brave Dwarven army pack and the Code of Chivalry Human army pack.

== Reception ==
In a review of BattleLore in Black Gate, Jeff Stehman said "This game is fun and fast once you learn it. The rule book is gorgeous and while the miniatures won't rock your world, they're clear and stable."

Other reviews:

- Rebel Times #12

== Awards and honors ==
- 2007 Golden Geek Best 2-Player Board Game Nominee
- 2007 Golden Geek Best 2-Player Board Game Winner
- 2007 Golden Geek Best Board Game Artwork/Presentation Nominee
- 2007 Golden Geek Best Board Game Artwork/Presentation Winner
- 2007 Golden Geek Best Wargame Nominee
- 2007 Hra roku Nominee
- 2007 International Gamers Award - General Strategy: Two-players
- 2007 France - Nominee Tric Trac
- 2008 Hra roku Nominee
