= Dominant Species (board game) =

2010 board game

- Dominant Species (first edition) box cover
- Years active: 2011, 2012, 2014 and 2018.
- Genres: Evolutionary Conflict
- Players: 2-6
- Playing time: 120–240 Min
- Chance: low

Dominant Species is a 2010 competitive, area control board game published by GMT Games, designed by Chad Jensen. The game is an evolution-themed game in which players take on the role of broad categories of life: mammals, reptiles, birds, amphibians, arachnids, and insects in a world heading for the Ice Age.

== Game Play ==
The map is formed from hexagonal tiles in 7 terrain varieties (mountain, desert, forest, jungle, savannah, wetland or sea). Over the course of the game new tiles are added but also some are overlain with smaller tundra tiles. Each player has a player board and a number of species cubes, which the players aim to spread across the map. A key component in the game is the 6 Elements (grass, grub, meat, seed, sun, water), which can be both on the corners of tiles (representing supply) and on the players' boards (representing requirements) and also in the draw bag or action display. The better a species matches its requirements with the supply offered by the Elements on the tiles they occupy, the better it is doing. Also each player has action pawns which are used in a worker placement style in the action display section of the board.

Each turn consists of three phases: Planning, Execution and Reset.

In the Planning phase players use their action pawns to claim a slot in the Execution phase.

In the Execution phase each action pawn does its action according to the slot it was placed in, starting at the top of the action display and working down. Each player gets a special ability based on their animal class. For example birds can move further in the migration stage; insects get a free speciation action and arachnids get a free competition action. Most of the Execution actions move Elements, tiles or species cubes in ways that help or hinder the players. However the two with most dramatic effects are Glaciation and Dominance. In the Glaciation action the player may change one tile to a much less hospitable tundra tile. This will remove species and possibly Elements from the board and also scores points. In the Dominance action the player selects one tile for a dominance check. Players score points based on how many cubes they have on the tile, but the player whose requirements are best met by the supply on that tile must choose and execute a dominance card from those available. For example, the intelligence dominance card will allow some players to get an extra action pawn.

Finally in the Reset phase endangered species (those zero of whose requirements are met) are removed, one player may score points for occupying the most tundra tiles and housekeeping is done on the action display.

The game ends at the end of the turn in which the Ice Age dominance card (always at the bottom of the deck) is played. Then the player with the most points wins.

== History ==
Dominant Species has won the following awards:

- 2011 Golden Geek Board Game of the Year Winner
- 2011 Golden Geek Best Strategy Board Game Winner

It has been reprinted in 2011, 2012, 2014 and 2018. As of 31 March 2021 Dominant Species is GMT's 3rd best top selling game, after Commands & Colors: Ancients and Twilight Struggle.

The artwork has been revamped. Joe Jones states that

Depending on which edition you buy, the artwork differs quite a bit. The original came in for a bit of bashing due to its rather dull appearance. Future releases changed this, meaning the artwork is now much fuller and more colorful, ....

GMT Games has ported the game to a digital format. A cards based version and a marine themed sequel have been produced.

== Reception ==
The New Scientist have listed Dominant Species as one of the "9 of the best board games to play for fans of science and tech".

According to Andrew Smith:

Dominant Species can be a mean, frustrating game of survival of fittest. But the game mechanisms are extremely streamlined, easy to teach, and fairly intuitive to understand.

The rule book is highly regarded as "as one of the gold standards" and "easily one of the best in the industry".

In a review of Dominant Species in Black Gate, Howard Andrew Jones said "The themes in some games seem tacked on as an afterthought, but that of Dominant Species is integral. It may be the finest science-themed game that I've ever played, and is certainly one of the better tactical games, with the added benefit that it does not play slowly."
