= 1960: The Making of the President =

Political simulation board game

1960: The Making of the President is a board game simulation of the 1960 U.S. presidential election in which Senator John F. Kennedy narrowly defeated Vice-President Richard M. Nixon. It was created by Jason Matthews and Christian Leonhard and was originally published by Z-Man Games. Graphic design was supplied by Joshua Cappel. The game was released in 2007. A second edition of the game was published in 2017 by GMT Games with art direction and new package design by Rodger B. MacGowan and new game component art by Donal Hegarty and Mark Simonitch.

== Gameplay ==
1960: The Making of the President is a card-driven game in which each candidate is dealt several cards per turn; these cards can be spent to campaign, advertise, or position on issues. Each card also has a specific event, such as Nixon Egged in Michigan or Johnson Jeered in Dallas that influences the campaign. The core of the game is deciding whether to spend the card to campaign (which is more flexible) or on the event (which tend to be more powerful but restrictive). In addition, since the rival candidate can benefit from an event their opponent plays, timing the card plays to minimize any damage is a significant part of the game.

The board game takes effect mostly in the last few weeks of the campaign, and many specific events add much historical flavor to the game. An "Unpledged Electors" card, for example, parallels the real-life worry that Kennedy had that many southern electors would deny his majority in the electoral college. Nixon must worry about "Eisenhower's Silence", where the incumbent president only gives a lukewarm endorsement to his vice-president.

The famous debate between the candidates and election day are abstracted in their own separate set of rules. The debates tend to have a minimal impact unless one candidate or the other sweeps the issues, in which case it can jump-start a laggard campaign. Reflecting the historical record, there are a few cards that aid Kennedy in the debate but none for Nixon.

1960 has many mechanics in common with the board game Twilight Struggle, which was also designed by Jason Matthews (along with Ananda Gupta).

== Awards ==
The board game won the International Gamers Award in 2008 for "Best 2-Player Game" in the General Strategy category.

== Reviews ==
- Pyramid
- Family Games: The 100 Best
