= Twilight Struggle =

Board game

The Cold War, 1945–1989
- First edition box art
- Designers: Ananda Gupta; Jason Matthews
- Illustrators: Viktor Csete; Rodger B. MacGowan; Guillaume Ries; Mark Simonitch
- Publishers: GMT Games
- Publication: 2005
- Genres: Wargame
- Players: 2
- Setup time: 5–15 minutes
- Playing time: 3 hours
- Chance: Medium (dice, cards)
- Skills: Strategy; Card management

Twilight Struggle: The Cold War, 1945–1989 is a board game for two players, published by GMT Games in 2005. Players are the United States and Soviet Union contesting each other's influence on the world map by using cards that correspond to historical events. The first game designed by Ananda Gupta and Jason Matthews, they intended it to be a quick-playing alternative to more complex card-driven wargames.

It achieved critical acclaim for its well-integrated theme, accessibility and introduction of Eurogame elements. After being voted the number one game on BoardGameGeek from December 2010 to January 2016 (eventually dethroned by Pandemic Legacy), it has been called "the best board game on the planet". Twilight Struggle is played competitively and was unofficially adapted for play-by-email and live online play. GMT released a Deluxe Edition in 2009, as well as a Collector's Edition as part of the crowdfunding campaign for the game's official adaptation into a video game; this Digital Edition was released in 2016. With over 100,000 copies sold, the game is GMT's all-time best-seller.

== Gameplay overview ==
Detail of adjacent countries in Europe and the Middle East. Net influence equal to or greater than a country's stability number delivers control for that side. Influence counters flipped to the colored side indicate control.

According to its designers, "Twilight Struggle basically accepts all of the internal logic of the Cold War as true—even those parts of it that are demonstrably false." The game board thus presents a map of a bipolar world according to domino theory, where the US and USSR spread influence to all other countries (except China, which is shown as a powerful card, which must be handed to the other player if used, representing China tilting from one bloc to the other), and attempt to establish control depending on the stability of a country. One scholarly analysis proposed that "[w]hile Twilight Struggle is at its core an area control game, what set its apart from being marked as a Risk clone is the combined effect of material aesthetics and design mechanics meant to embrace a particular point of view tied to the Cold War zeitgeist."

Gameplay is divided into ten turns. Each turn players randomly draw a hand of event cards from a single deck. The starting deck contains only early war cards, with historically appropriate mid war and late war events shuffled in on turns 4 and 8 (for a total of 103 cards in the first edition). Players both use a card in the turn's headline phase (in which each player must play a card for its event) and six to eight action rounds.

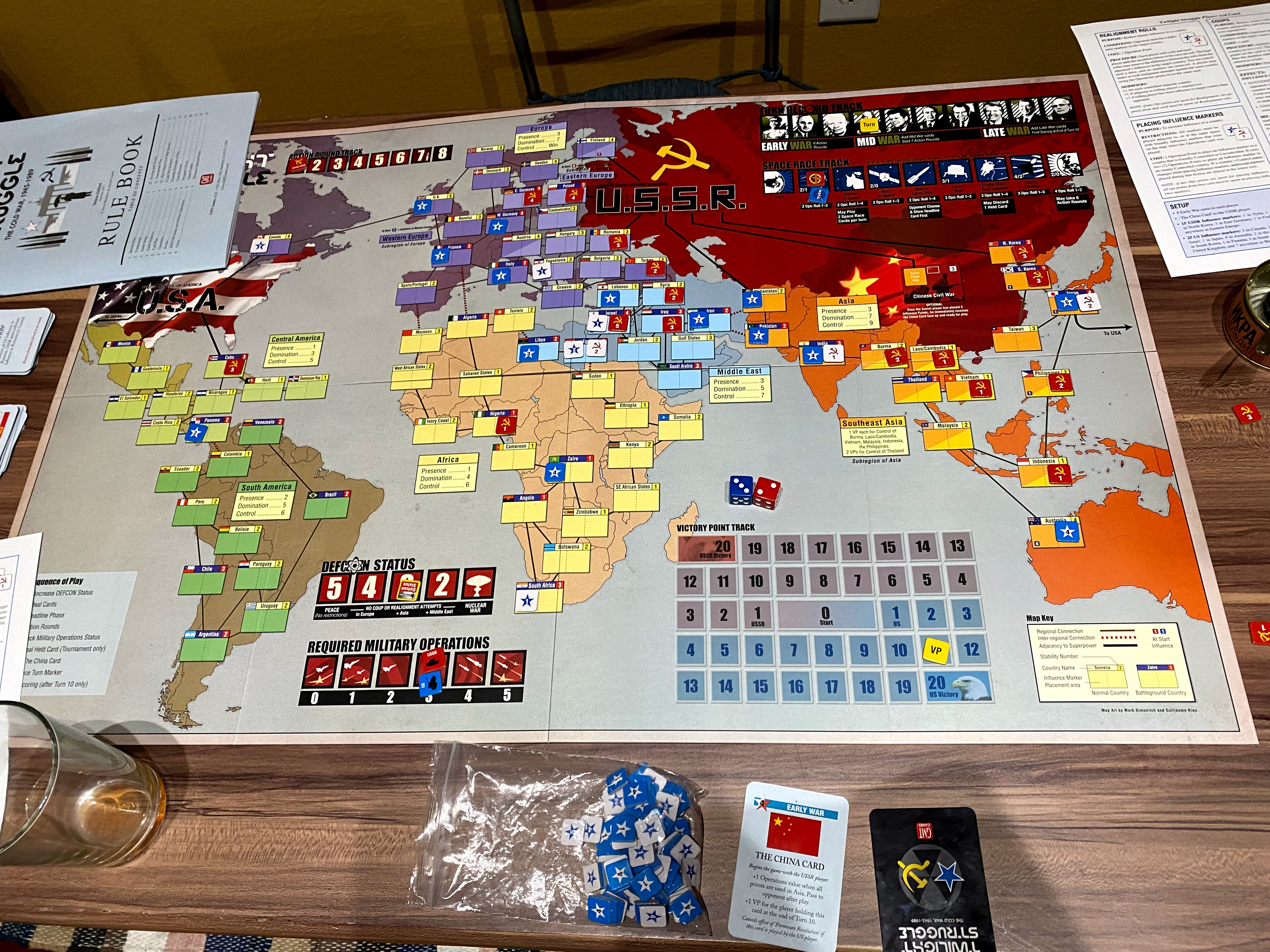
An example of Twilight Struggle game play

=== Operations and events ===
Cards have operations point values that let a player take one of three actions on the board: to place influence markers in or adjacent to countries where he already has influence; to attempt realignment to remove enemy influence, with bonuses depending on existing influence; or to attempt a coup that can reduce an opponent's influence and increase his own influence in a single country. Realignment and coup attempts partially rely on dice rolls to succeed.

If a card's event is associated with that player, or neutral, the player must choose either to conduct operations or get the beneficial effect of the event. However, if a player conducts operations using a card with an opponent's event, the event occurs as well. For example, the US player can use two operations points from playing the Soviet event "Fidel", at the expense of its effect: "Remove all US Influence in Cuba. USSR gains sufficient Influence in Cuba for Control." A further option, allowed once per turn, is to expend a card attempting to advance in the Space Race, avoiding triggering that card's event. Strategy requires players to anticipate reactions to what their opponent might play.

=== Scoring and victory ===
Regional scoring cards award victory points to both players based on their respective level of influence—presence, domination or control—in that region when the card is played. The regions have unequal values: domination of Central America is worth three VP but domination of Asia is worth seven. Normally players will hold one card per turn into the next, but scoring cards may not be held.

Player actions are constrained by the DEFCON and required military operations tracks. A coup attempt on one of the battleground countries reduces DEFCON by one each time, representing an increase in tensions and restricting the regions where coups and realignments may be attempted. If DEFCON 1 is reached during a player's action round, that player is deemed to have caused a nuclear war and loses immediately. Each turn, however, players will also lose victory points if they do not conduct military operations (coup attempts or playing war events) at least equal to the DEFCON level.

Victory points are gained or lost on a shared one-dimensional track, and a player who reaches 20 VP in their favor wins immediately. Control of Europe when its scoring card is played also awards an early victory. If neither player has won by the end of turn 10, a final scoring occurs in which each region is scored once.

According to an analysis of the game's design, "In some respects, Twilight Struggle resembles a modern-style Eurogame more than a wargame", in that the game offers multiple paths to score and win. It summarized the game play thus: "Rules and limited strategic choices governing Event triggers combine to ensure a roughly-accurate historical experience; within this framework of bad and suboptimal choices, one player will eventually squeak out a victory."

=== Theme ===
Although Twilight Struggle was designed to be simple and playable, it has strongly thematic gameplay. The rules reflect the logic of the Cold War, and the cards refer to actual historical people and events, generally being illustrated with historical photographs. For example, the rule that a player may only add influence to a country where they already have influence or to an adjacent country means that players’ influence moves across borders in a predictable way, simulating domino theory. Meanwhile, the Space Race track includes steps named "Man in Space", a reference to Yuri Gagarin, and "Space Shuttle".

Meanwhile, individual cards reference not only major historical happenings, such "Marshall Plan", "Destalinisation", and "Captured Nazi Scientists"—which invokes Operation Paperclip—and small-scale ones, such as "Yuri and Samantha", based on schoolgirl Samantha Smith's visit to the Soviet Union. Other events reflect the culture of the Cold War, such as "Voice of America" and "Olympic Games", which allows one player to boycott the Games. A few are metatextual, such as "How I Learned To Stop Worrying" and "Wargames", both referring to films about the Cold War and even wargames themselves.

== Development ==
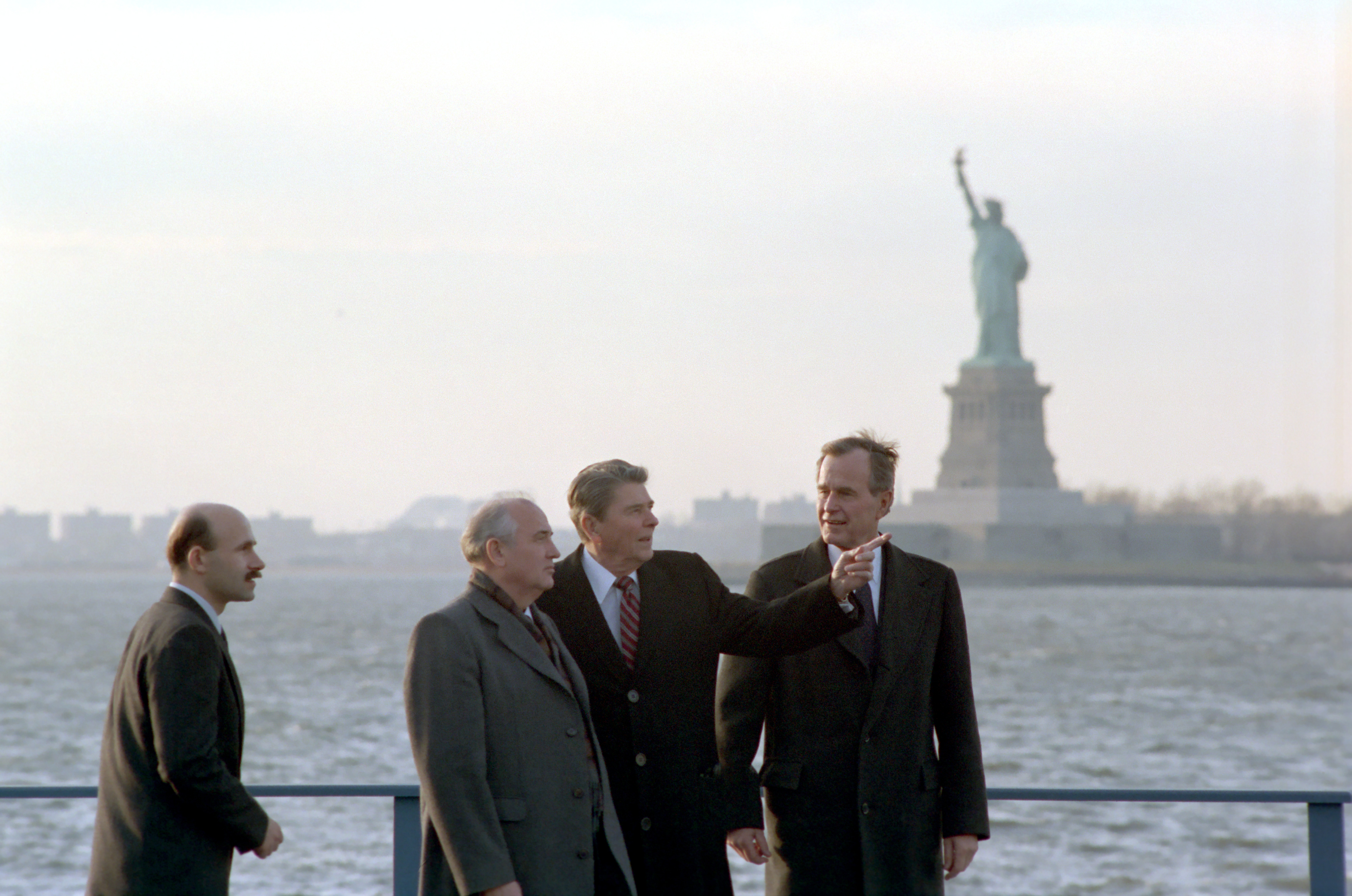
Many event cards are decorated with historic photographs, such as this image of Mikhail Gorbachev and Ronald Reagan for "The Reformer", a USSR event.

Other cards use colored illustrations, like the flag of NATO for the "NATO" US event.

Wargaming hobbyists Jason Matthews and Ananda Gupta met in 1998 at a board gaming club at George Washington University. They hoped to take advantage of a resurgence in wargaming led by card-driven games, but wanted a quick-playing game to fit their own schedule—more in the vein of We the People and Hannibal: Rome vs. Carthage than the likes of Paths of Glory. They rejected a Spanish Civil War theme after realizing they did not know enough about the period. Gupta suggested the Cold War theme, which fit well for Matthews, who had studied it extensively when majoring in international relations in the 1980s. According to Matthews, the Cold War had not been depicted in a two-player board game before.

Design drew on many other games. The influence-based scoring system derived from History of the World, and scoring cards from the work of Alan Moon. Using game mechanics to incentivize historical behavior came from experience with For the People. The futility of nuclear war, and its relation to conventional military operations, came from the video game Balance of Power as well as Supremacy. Twilight Struggle takes its title from John F. Kennedy's inaugural address. Early versions were more complex and simulation-like, but through playtesting eventually almost every mechanic was abstracted and the event deck made much smaller: "Many clever and interesting ideas were discarded as being contrary to the fundamental guiding principles of the game – fast play, simple rules, and getting a lot of gameplay value out of the cards."

By the summer of 2000, Matthews and Gupta were promoting a prototype at the World Boardgaming Championships. Their first choice of publisher was GMT Games, where Gupta had had a playtesting job. GMT founder Gene Billingsley immediately felt drawn to the theme but had doubts about the game's marketability, and placed it on the company's Project 500 list—it would be published if it achieved 500 preorders. The game ultimately shipped in December 2005 with a retail price of $57.

=== Later editions ===
Matthews subsequently wrote a set of optional rules to simulate the Chinese Civil War, and Volko Ruhnke developed a scenario starting in the late war era. Both were included with the Deluxe Edition in 2009, in addition to new map art, event text revisions and a set of optional cards.

In addition to a Collector's Edition made with luxury materials, potential bonuses with Digital Edition preorders were a set of new cards and the Turn Zero mini-expansion, which adds an earlier starting point and the possibility that historical events such as the 1945 United Kingdom general election, the Battle of Berlin, or the Chinese Civil War happened differently. GMT made a reprint of the new cards and expansion available for general purchase.

In 2022, GMT released Jason Matthews's game Twilight Struggle: Red Sea. Based on the Horn of Africa in the 1970s, especially the deposition of Haile Selassie, it is designed to play similarly to the original game but only take 35 minutes to play. In addition, cards from Twilight Struggle and Red Sea may be used in either game.

== Reception ==
Initial reviews were positive but sales were not as successful. However, when Alan Moon, an influential designer of Eurogames, endorsed the game the first printing sold out quickly. According to one account, "Twilight Struggle came out the same weekend as the Boardgame Players Association's Winter Activation Meeting ... Though it was not an event on the schedule, Twilight Struggle was the talk of the show ... At PrezCon a month later, the dealer sold out in the first few minutes he was open."

Jon Waddington for Gamers Alliance Report was positive but noted problems with unclear card and rule book texts (in the first edition). "I cannot quite give Twilight Struggle an unqualified recommendation, and yet I consider it one of the best games I've played in the last few years." Rating the game 93%, Armchair General reviewer Kaarin Engelmann pointed out that "One of its strengths is that few other games deal with the subject, yet it is not important to remember pre-Glasnost years to enjoy the game." Game designer Zev Shlasinger commented: "Twilight Struggle gives you a compact history lesson about the Cold War ... Coupled with that is the game's accessibility and the design's cleverness, all of which make Twilight Struggle stand out among the crowd of recent political wargame releases."

Users voted Twilight Struggle the highest-ranked game on BoardGameGeek from December 2010 until it was unseated by Pandemic Legacy in January 2016. This led later commentators like FiveThirtyEight's Oliver Roeder to call it "the best board game on the planet"; Vice Motherboard's Michael Gaynor called it "the best board game ever created". It became GMT Games' all-time best-seller, with lifetime sales of approximately 100,000 copies as of July 2016.

=== Awards ===
- 2005 – Charles S. Roberts Award for Best Modern Era Boardgame and James F. Dunnigan Award (to Gupta and Matthews)
- 2005 – Nominated for Origins Award for Historical Boardgame of the Year
- 2006 – International Gamers Award for Best 2-Player Strategy Game and Best Historical Simulation Game, the first game to win two IGAs.
- 2006 – BoardGameGeek Golden Geek Award for Best Wargame and Best 2-Player Board Game
- 2006 – Nominated for the Diana Jones Award for Excellence in Gaming
- 2007 – Nominated by Games magazine for Best Historical Simulation
- 2011 – Lucca Comics & Games Best of Show in Boardgame for Experts (for Italian edition by Asterion Press)
- 2012 – Ludoteca Ideale winner (Italian edition)
- 2012 – Gra Roku nominee (for Polish edition by Bard Centrum Gier)
- 2024 – GAMA Academy of Adventure Gaming Arts and Design, Hall of Fame Inductee
- 2025 – Board Game Geek Hall of Fame

== Influence ==
Jason Matthews reused mechanics of Twilight Struggle in several games. For example, in 1960: The Making of the President, the countries are replaced by states, and victory points are replaced by electoral votes deciding the 1960 United States presidential election. Similar adaptations are Campaign Manager 2008, 1989: Dawn of Freedom and Founding Fathers. Volko Ruhnke used it as the "starting point" for the mechanics of Labyrinth: "What would Twilight Struggle look like if it were covering 2004 to 2009?"

Matthews and Gupta next collaborated on Imperial Struggle: The Global Rivalry Between Britain and France, 1697–1789. Gupta characterized Twilight Struggle as an "older cousin" to Imperial Struggle.

== Online play ==
Following a crowdfunding campaign on Kickstarter, Twilight Struggle Digital Edition was released in 2016. Developed by Playdek and published by Asmodee Digital, this paid version allows play against a computer in addition to another player. It was released for Windows, macOS, iOS and Android; the campaign had also promised a Linux edition.

Before 2016, it was available in Wargamesroom for PC.

Other alternatives, allowed by GMT games only if at least one player owns the board game are:

- Saito (available in English and Chinese)
- F14 (available only in Chinese)
- Automated Card Tracking System (for play-by-email) complemented with:
  - Cyberboard Gamebox
  - Module for the open-source Vassal Engine
  - TwiStrug virtual board.

== Competitions ==
Twilight Struggle has been played in different online and live tournaments since 2005. Currently, among the most relevant active tournaments, the following stand out:

- International league (hybrid: online and face-to-face): ITSL
- International online leagues: OTSL and RTSL
- Asynchronous international leagues: RATS and BPA Tournament
- National leagues: KTSL, LFTS, French League, UK League, Greek League, LPTS, Nordic League and various regional American leagues.
- On-site championships: TS Convention, WBC Tournament
- 2-Day Online Tournaments: Online World Cup, Mind Sports Olympiad, Grand Slams
- Team Tournaments: Nations Cup and US Cup

Most of these championships count their results within a unified rating (ITS Rating), allowing to know in advance the level of each player and thus being able to balance the schedules in an optimal way. Some of the competitions are broadcast live with commentators in specialized channels like ActionRoundZero or Caecius.

The original rule book included the tournament rule of revealing held cards at the end of a turn, to prevent cheating by holding a scoring card. In more modern competitions this was replaced by showing the bottom of the card, demonstrating that it is not a scoring card.

The Deluxe Edition rule book includes an annotated "Extended Example of Play" taken from a Boardgame Players Association play-by-email tournament. The Collector's Edition rule book provides for tournament players to bid starting influence on their preferred side. In most of the current competitions, +2 influence points for USA and option cards are used as standard, obtaining a balance very close to 50% between both sides.

The original rules allow for a tie, although in the Playdek application in case of a tie in Final Scoring the victory is given to the American player and in case of a tie through Wargames the victory is given to the player who did not event the card. Most of today's competitions follow the original rules and therefore allow for ties.

=== ITSL ===
ITSL (International Twilight Struggle League) is the oldest active tournament in Twilight Struggle, since 2006, including most important Twilight Struggle players. Jason Matthews himself played in the first edition.

Edition	Number of players	Number of games	Winner	Runner-up
2006	20	138	(Germany) Michael Loth	(United States) Rick Young
2007	48	299	(United States) Steven Bauer	(United States) Rob March
2008	49	282	(Germany) Charles Féaux de la Croix	(Finland) Sakari Lahti
2010	50	290	(China) Wu Haifu	(Canada) Randy Pippus
2012	44	276	(Hungary) Gábor Földes	(Finland) Riku Riekkinen
2013	53	340	(Finland) Riku Riekkinen	(Canada) Charles Robinson
2014	63	345	(Finland) Riku Riekkinen	(Poland) Jędrzej Gąsiorowski
2015	60	359	(Poland) Jędrzej Gąsiorowski	(Poland) Ziemowit Pazderski
2020	107	1083	(China) Kaiyan Fan	(China) Kris Wei
2021	207	2155	(China) Min Cao	(Liechtenstein) Janusz Szulc
2022	240	2306	(Poland) Ziemowit Pazderski	(China) Zerun He
2023	240	2058	(United States) Michael Patnik	(Sweden) Henrik Pettersson
2024	192	1960	(Czech Republic) Tomas Tvaroh	(Spain) Jarib Flores
2025	192	1960	(Poland) Ziemowit Pazderski	(Czech Republic) Tomas Tvaroh
2026	192	1960	(China) Weiran Xie	(China) Yamei Chen

=== Nations Cup ===
The Nations Cup is played by national teams who take decisions by consensus. The competition starts with a Qualifying Stage, after which the strongest teams play in the Final Stage."TS Nations Cup".

Edition	Number of nations	Winner	Runner-up	Third place
2021	18	People's Republic of China	Canada	Hong Kong
2022	26	Hong Kong	Poland	Spain
2023	21	Israel	United States of America	Poland
2024	22	South Korea	Canada	People's Republic of China
2025	20	Belgium	Hong Kong	Canada

=== Convention ===
Year	Location	Number of players	Winner	Runner-up	Third place
2013	(Netherlands) Amsterdam	11	(Poland) Jarek Moc	(Netherlands) Daniel Hogetoorn	(Sweden) Bjorn Von Knorring
2014	(Netherlands) Amsterdam	19	(Poland) Jedrzej Gasiorowski	(Poland) Jarek Moc	(Netherlands) Daniel Hogetoorn
2015	(Poland) Warsaw	21	(Poland) Ziemowit Pazderski	(Liechtenstein) Wojciech Pietrzak	(Greece) Stavros Nikolakopoulos
2016	(Greece) Thessaloniki	10	(Czech Republic) Tomas Tvaroh	(Greece) Nick Doumpas	(Greece) Thanos Bahtsevanis
2017	(Netherlands) Amsterdam	15	(Greece) Thanos Bahtsevanis	(Poland) Ziemowit Pazderski	(United States) Tim Bina
2018	(Poland) Warsaw	19	(Liechtenstein) Wojciech Pietrzak	(Poland) Ziemowit Pazderski	(Poland) Tomasz Borowy
2019	(Greece) Thessaloniki	14	(Poland) Ziemowit Pazderski	(Canada) David Lancashire	(Egypt) Yahia Abaza
2022	(United Kingdom) London	18	(Poland) Ziemowit Pazderski	(Egypt) Yahia Abaza	(China) Kaiyan Fan
2023	(Sweden) Stockholm	22	(United States) Ryan Pindulic	(Poland) Ziemowit Pazderski	(Sweden) Fredrik Adlercreutz
2024	(Greece) Kythira	22	(Greece) Giorgos Iosifidis	(United States) Ryan Pindulic	(Greece) Makis Bahtsevanis
2025	(Basque Country (autonomous community)) Vitoria-Gasteiz	32	(Netherlands) Aleksei Lobunko	(Spain) Eduardo Sans	(Basque Country (autonomous community)) Bidart Larrakoetxea
2026	(Greece) Athens	10	(Greece) Tasos Manolopoulos	(Greece) Evangelos Iosifidis	(Greece) Dimitris Kritikos
2027	TBD	TBD	TBD	TBD	TBD

== See also ==
- Timeline of events in the Cold War
