= Lost Victory =

1994 WWII board wargame

- Cover art by Rodger B. MacGowan
- Designers: David James Ritchie
- Illustrators: Rodger B. MacGowan; Mark Simonitch; Joe Youst
- Publishers: GMT Games
- Publication: 1994
- Genres: WWII

Lost Victory, subtitled "Manstein at Kharkov, Winter 1943", is a board wargame published by GMT Games in 1994 that simulates the German/Soviet winter campaign of 1943 during World War II that ended in the Third Battle of Kharkov.

== Background ==
By the summer of 1942, Germany's offensive deep inside the Soviet Union had slowly come to a halt, and Soviet forces now started to force the German invaders back, but at the cost of overextending their supply lines. On the other hand, the German's slow withdrawals brought them closer to their own supply depots, allowing them to reinforce and set up defensive lines. In February 1943, the Soviet's Voronezh Front launched Operation Star, an offensive in Ukraine against Germany's Army Group South in an attempt to retake the cities of Kharkov and Kursk. While initially successful in capturing both cities, the Soviets overextended themselves, allowing Field Marshal Erich von Manstein to launch a counteroffensive against the Soviet flanks, leading to the Third Battle of Kharkov.

== Description ==
Lost Victory is a board wargame for two players in which one controls the Soviet forces, and the other controls the German forces.

=== Components ===
The 22" x 34" hex grid game map, scaled at 6 kilometres (3.7 mi) per hex, displays the area around Kharkov. There are 480 counters, a 32-page book of relatively complex rules, and two 4-page Player Aid Cards. A ten-sided die is used to resolve all combat.

=== Gameplay ===
==== Initiative ====
Most wargames up until Lost Victory used the alternating "I Go, You Go" turn system, where one player always went first, and the other player always went second. In Lost Victory, players must bid on the right to go first. At the start of each turn, the players bid by declaring the number of attacks they will undertake during the turn. The winner is the player who bids the most attacks. If the winning player fails to make that number of attacks during their turn, they must disrupt a number of their units equal to the bid. In addition, the other player gains initiative on the next turn without an auction, and can make as many or as few attacks as desired without penalty. The game lasts for 16 Turns, unless one side or the other achieves their geographical victory conditions first.

==== Operations ====
Each of the 16 turns of the game, which each represent three days of the battle, is divided into six operations phases, three for each player. Each operations phase is the opportunity for the active player to engage in movement (including overruns), rally disorganized units, bombard, and engage in combat. The player can do any of those things in any order any number of times, as long as the player has the necessary resources. When the active player is finished, the other player has an operations phase. This alternates between the two players until both have had three operations phases, or both have run out of the resources necessary to extend play.

=== Supply ===
During the Soviet Operations phase, the Axis player can choose any one moving Soviet stack and force it to halt for lack of fuel. The Soviet player can negate this by announcing an "emergency fuel delivery," but only three times.

==== Reaction ====
When a unit enters an opposing unit's zone of control, the defending unit has an opportunity to move away, one hex for infantry and two hexes for motorized. To do so, the defending player must roll a ten-sided die and score 3–9 (German player) or 4–8 (Soviet player). A roll of 1–2 results in the unit being disrupted and not moving.

== Publication history ==
Lost Victory was designed by David James Ritchie and was published by GMT Games in 1994 with cover art by Rodger B. MacGowan and interior art and graphic design by Mark Simonitch and Joe Youst.

== Reception ==
In Issue 89 of the British wargaming magazine Perfidious Albion, Ian Drury commented "First impressions are good" but then discovered that Lost Victory foundered in overly long turns. He wrote "The [game] takes nerves of steel. It also requires the patience of Job. There are 16 turns ... Since one hour per movement/combat phase is not an unreasonable playing time, you'll do well to finish two games turns [out of 16] an evening ... The long playing time makes it difficult to finish a game and very unlikely you will play a second or third game."

In Issue 16 of Berg's Review of Games, Carl Gruber called the new system of gameplay "unorthodox ... the player, not the designer, determines how and when he will attack or move and in what order, the only limits being his success, failure and available resources. This demands of players a lot more 'generalship' than you normally see in board wargames." Of the new "bidding" process for initiative, Gruber noted, "this mechanism forces you to make no more attacks than you can win, or be forced into either losing the initiative (and suffering disrupted units) or making suicidal attacks just to keep the initiative. Makes for real tough decisions." On the negative side, Gruber found the rules to be poorly edited, leading to the loss of "some very necessary information ... Many important items are buried in the rules." Gruber pointed out, as an example, "the printed entrenchments around Kharkov do not really 'exist' until game turn 4. This is not noted on the game turn record; it is found in a footnote to rule 11.33 on p. 16." Gruber concluded, "Lost Victory takes a long time to play and requires painstaking attention to detail. It's not all that complex, though; rather, it is very subtle and you have to think twice about whatever you are doing ... I had to play it several times before I appreciated what [game designer] Ritchie was doing. And while I still wonder whether just a few things could not have been streamlined, it eventually became worth the effort."

In Issue 2 of Zone of Control, John P. Bowen found the game "easy to learn and play, handy and attractive." However, Bowen found some aspects of the rules, such as bidding for initiative or declaring a Soviet fuel shortage, to be "gamey" — they give players an opportunity to win via the rules rather than via strategy. Bowen rated the game "Good" for gameplay and "Fair" for historicity, saying, "Lost Victory has a vision that goes beyond pushing the interactive design envelope just for the sake of doing so. The designer shows us that the best laid plans of mice and men often go astray ... But in trying to show the problems faced by the Red Army, [game designer] Ritchie failed to identify their true cause. It's still a helluva game, though."
