= Richard Borg =

American board game designer

- Born: 1948 (age 77–78); Connecticut
- Occupation: Designer

Richard Borg is a game designer who has designed many wargames. In 2010, he was elected to the Charles Roberts Awards Hall of Fame.

Games that Richard Borg has designed or co-designed include the following:

- Liar's Dice, 1993 Spiel des Jahres winner
- 2000 Battle Cry (2001 International Gamers Award winner for General Strategy, 2-Player category)
- 2000 Hera and Zeus (2001 International Gamers Award winner for General Strategy, 2-Player)
- 2001 Wyatt Earp with Mike Fitzgerald (2001 Meeples' Choice Award)
- 2004 Memoir '44 (2004 International Gamers Award winner for General Strategy, 2-Player category and The Wargamer 2004 Award for Excellence)
- 2006 BattleLore (First Edition) (2007 International Gamers Award winner for General Strategy, 2-Player)
- 2006 Commands & Colors: Ancients (2006 Origins Award winner for Historical Board Game of the Year)
- 2007 Stonehenge designed with prominent game designers Richard Garfield, Bruno Faidutti, James Ernest, and Mike Selinker.
- 2010 Commands & Colors: Napoleonics (2012 Games Magazine Best New Historical Simulation Game Winner)
- 2012 Samurai Battles (2013 Origins Awards, Best Historical Board Game Winner)
- 2019 Commands & Colors: Medieval
- 2019 Red Alert - Space Fleet Warfare
- 2021 Commands & Colors: Samurai Battles (re-release of the Commands & Colors part from 2012)
- 2025 Star Wars: Battle of Hoth

Games that he designed with award-winning game designer Alan R. Moon include Warriors, Gracias, and Wongar.
