= 1989: Dawn of Freedom =

Boardgame by GMT Games

- Designers: Jason Matthews; Ted Torgerson
- Publishers: GMT Games
- Publication: 2012; 13 years ago
- Genres: Wargame
- Players: 2
- Playing time: 150 minutes
- Age range: 12+

1989: Dawn of Freedom is a wargame designed by Jason Matthews and Ted Torgerson and published in 2012 by GMT Games. The game takes place in the final stages of the Cold War as two sides with opposing interests clash in the Eastern Bloc for power and control.

== Gameplay ==
The game uses a political system similar to that of the GMT Games bestseller Twilight Struggle where players use Events and Operations Points ("Ops") to establish influence within socio-economic groups and countries. One side plays as the Communists, trying to maintain power over the six Warsaw Pact countries and avoid total collapse. The other side plays as the Democrats, doing all in their power to topple the communist regimes and establish democracies throughout Eastern Europe. The entire game takes place within 1989 over the course of ten rounds, each with seven turns, with an automatic victory during the year or final scoring at the end of its last turn. It is played on a board featuring a turn record track, a Tiananmen Square track, a Victory Point tracker, and various city and "leader" spaces within the six countries.

Players begin each round by drawing up to eight Strategy cards, each featuring Ops values and an Event. Throughout the round players alternate turns, beginning with the Communist player and then the Democrat, playing one Strategy Card per turn either as Events or for Ops. If a card is played for Ops, that player may either: place that many Support Points ("SPs") in cities their ideology has SPs in or adjacent ones to gain influence, make a Support Check with a die roll to remove opponent influence, or advance the Tiananmen Square track once per turn with a die roll. Events are marked with different colours to indicate whether they favour the Communist (red), the Democrat (blue), or both sides (silver) and will still occur when a card is played for Ops if it is the opponent's colour. Various points along the Tiananmen Square track award beneficial effects that last until the opposing player reaches that point.

Within the Strategy card deck are country Scoring cards which when played cause players to receive Power Struggle cards relative to the number of spaces in that country they have influence in. There are three types of cards: cards with suits (Rally in the Square, Strike, March, and Petition), cards with leaders corresponding to the board spaces, and wild cards. Beginning with the player who played the Scoring card, players play Power Struggle cards with matching suits back and forth until one player has no cards that match the suit. Leader cards allow the player to choose a new suit and can be played on any suit if the player has influence in the corresponding board space. After the Power Struggle has concluded, dice are rolled to determine the influence the losing player loses from that country and the number of Victory Points the winning player receives.

The game ends after either ten rounds have passed or one player has 20 Victory Points. All Victory Points are tracked on a single track from -20 (Communists) to 20 (Democrats), such that points awarded to the Communists will be subtracted from the overall score and points awarded to the Democrats will be added to it. The Communist player is the winner if the final overall score is negative and the Democrat is the winner if it is positive.

== Reception ==
1989: Dawn of Freedom was nominated for a 2012 Charles S. Roberts Award in the 'Best Post-WW2 Era Board Wargame' category.
