= Operation Mercury (wargame) =

1992 WWII board wargame

- Cover art by Rodger B. MacGowan
- Designers: Vance von Borries; Gene Billingsley
- Illustrators: Rodger B. MacGowan; Mark Simonitch
- Publishers: GMT Games
- Publication: 1992
- Genres: WWII

Operation Mercury, subtitled "The German Airborne Assault on Crete, 1941", is a board wargame published by GMT Games in 1992 that simulates the German invasion of Crete during World War II.

== Background ==
In the spring of 1941, German forces invaded mainland Greece and despite support from Allied units, succeeded in occupying it. Allied forces still held the island of Crete but Germany was determined to invade the island to deny the Allies safe harbors in the Eastern Mediterranean and airfields for bombers targeting the Ploiești oil fields in Romania. "Operation Mercury" (German: Unternehmen Merkur) began on 20 May 1941 with a mass drop of Fallschirmjäger (German paratroops). These units suffered heavy losses on the first day, and a British victory seemed imminent. But on the second day, Maleme Airfield in western Crete fell, allowing the Germans to land reinforcements.

== Description ==
Lost Victory is a board wargame for two players in which one controls the Allied forces, and the other controls the Axis forces.

=== Components ===
Two 22" x 34" hex grid game maps, scaled at 1.5 kilometres (0.93 mi) per hex, display the island of Crete. There are 480 double-sided counters, a 40-page book of relatively complex rules, and eight Player Aid Cards. A ten-sided die is used to resolve all combat.

=== Gameplay ===
After the Allied troops have set up on the map, the German paratroop drop begins, and the German player must roll to ascertain how far from their landing zones the units have landed. The German player gets a first-turn special airborne assault to clear out nearby defenders. Both sides must abide by a combat system in which only units within range of an HQ counter can coordinate their attacks with the various forces available. Critic Scott Johnson noted, "The game is engineered so that almost nothing goes right for the players. When both sides do manage to reorganize, they find that attacks are still hard to execute. This is because the combat system puts a premium on attack coordination, something almost impossible to achieve without HQs … and there are far too few of those to go around."

=== Scenarios ===
The game includes five short scenarios covering various aspects of the battle for Crete. These can all be combined into a long campaign game covering the entire battle.

== Publication history ==
In 1977, Vance von Borries designed Air Assault on Crete, which was published by Avalon Hill. Fifteen years later, von Borries returned to the Battle of Crete, designing Operation Mercury with Gene Billingsley. It was published by GMT Games in 1992 with cover art by Rodger B. MacGowan, cartography by Mark Simonitch and graphic design by John Kranz.

== Reception ==
In Issue 89 of the British wargaming magazine Perfidious Albion, Ian Drury liked the quality of the components,, commenting, "GMT Games seems to have set a new standard in boardgame production values. Operation Mercury includes two 22 x 34-in map sheets and enough clear and colourful counters to delight even the most jaded gamer." Drury also liked the subject matter, pointing out, "The battle for Crete is so full of 'what-ifs' that it is an ideal subject for a multi-layered game." However, Drury didn't like the overcrowded maps once hexes contained stacks of counters up to six high. "[Then] add fatigue counters, 'first fire' markers and others showing disrupted status, the direction of an attack and its co-ordination level — and you have a big pile of cardboard overlooking the beachfront." Despite this, Drury concluded, "Operation Mercury is certainly good value for the money."

In Issue 15 of Berg's Review of Games, Scott Johnson liked the production values, but play left him disappointed, as he wrote, "If the visual end of OpMerc is excitingly razz-ma-tazz, play is, sad to say, detail-induced tedium." Johnson found the rules too detailed, pointing out, "The actual game system proves to be a roiling sea, ponderously detailed with mini-rules through which the gamers must sail with great, and time-consuming, caution ... There is so much detail that page-flipping intermissions occur with the regularity of sponsor-induced time-outs for a TV football game." Johnson concluded, "One finds much good, much to admire, much that is creative. But, in combination, those three 'Goods' add up to one Slug. They act as an albatross around the player’s neck, slowing play to a crawl. A lot of effort was put into simulating an operation/battle in which few things went right. So much so, that you end up with a game that is historically accurate but ponderous and, ultimately, discouraging."
