= Eighth Air Force (game) =

Card-based WWII aerial wargame

- Cover art by Rodger B. MacGowan
- Designers: Gene Billingsley; Rodger B. MacGowan; Dan Verssen
- Illustrators: Rodger B. MacGowan
- Publishers: GMT Games
- Publication: 1995
- Genres: WWII aerial combat

Eighth Air Force, subtitled "Air War Over Europe, 1942–45", is a card-based wargame expansion published by GMT Games in 1995 that simulates the air combat between Allied and German aircraft during the final three years of World War II. This was the second game in the series Down in Flames, and as an expansion, required the previous game in the series, The Rise of the Luftwaffe, in order to play.

== Description ==
Eighth Air Force is a card game for 2–8 players in which one side controls bombers and their fighter escorts, while the other side controls fighters and antiaircraft defenses.

The game components include 128 die-cut counters representing pilots, altitude, drop tanks and hit markers, and 132-card deck used for aircraft.

=== Campaigns and scenarios ===
Six new solitaire campaigns are included in the game:

- North Sea 1940
- Daylight 1942
- Daylight 1943
- Daylight 1944
- Night 1942
- Night 1944

Each of these campaigns involves several missions.

Special mission scenarios are also included:

- "Blue Monday": Three missions over France on V1 and V-2 rocket bases.
- "Schweinfurt": One long mission to a ball bearing factory, including segments deep into the mission without any escort fighters.
- "Stalingrad Airlift": Each day of the German's Stalingrad Airlift, a Soviet ground attack mission against German forces is followed by a German supply flight to the besieged Sixth Army. The result of both drive the German situation either closer to surrender or breakout.
- '"Dam Busters": The British Dambusters Raid of 1943.

== Publication history ==
In 1993, GMT Games published Rise of the Luftwaffe, a card-based wargame designed by Gene Billingsley, Rodger B. MacGowan, and Dan Verssen that was billed as the first in the Down in Flames series of games. Two years later, GMT released Eighth Air Force, the second in the series, also created by Billingsley, MacGowan and Versen. MacGowan supplied the artwork. The second game was not a standalone game but an expansion of Rise of the Luftwaff — the first game was needed in order to play the second game.

Between 2001 and 2017, GMT would publish another ten games in the Down in Flames series.

== Reception ==
In Issue 22 of Paper Wars Dav Townsend noted, "The system uses cards, like Avalon Hill's Up Front or Naval War. Avoiding both the former's rule excesses and the latter's trivialization of history, the Down in Flames series provides a clever, fast-paced flavoring of World War II dogfighting." Townsend concluded, "Eighth Air Force needs a shade more work to make it excellent, but as is, it s easily worth the money."

In Issue 5 of Zone of Control, Steve Keifer noted "The cardplay is fast, with lots of action ... By the end of the evening there will be many kills and cratered targets." Keifer concluded by giving the game ratings of "Excellent" for gameplay and "Average" for historicity.

In Issue 8 of Simulacrum, Joseph Scoleri noted "As one might expect from such a system, the emphasis is on flavor rather than simulation. Nonetheless, the attention to historical detail and entertaining gameplay make the games attractive to nearly anyone interested in the era covered."
