= Washington's War =

Card-driven board wargame

- Designers: Mark Herman
- Illustrators: Charles Kibler; Harald Lieske; Rodger B. MacGowan; Mark Simonitch; John Trumbull
- Publishers: GMT Games
- Players: 2
- Setup time: 5 minutes
- Playing time: 90-120 minutes
- Chance: Medium (Dice, Cards)
- Age range: 12 and up
- Skills: Strategy; Card Management

Washington's War is a card-driven board wargame from GMT Games designed by Mark Herman. The game is set in during the American Revolutionary War and the map depicts the east coast of the United States. One player controls the American forces and the other player the British. The game is designed for two players and takes between ninety minutes and two hours to play.

Washington's War was published in 2010 and is a reprint and upgrade of the Avalon Hill game We the People, first published in 1994.

== Awards ==
- 2010 Golden Geek Best Wargame Winner
- 2010 Golden Geek Best Wargame Nominee
- 2010 Golden Geek Best 2-Player Board Game Winner
- 2010 Golden Geek Best 2-Player Board Game Nominee
- 2010 Charles S. Roberts Best Ancient to Napoleonic Era Board Wargame Winner
- 2010 Charles S. Roberts Best Ancient to Napoleonic Era Board Wargame Nominee
