= The Rise of the Luftwaffe =

Card-based WWII aerial wargame

- Cover art by Rodger B. MacGowan
- Designers: Gene Billingsley; Rodger B. MacGowan; Dan Verssen
- Illustrators: Rodger B. MacGowan
- Publishers: GMT Games
- Publication: 1993
- Genres: WWII aerial combat

The Rise of the Luftwaffe, subtitled "Volume One: Down in Flames Series 1939–1942", is a card-based wargame published by GMT Games in 1993 that simulates the air combat between Allied and German aircraft during the first four years of World War II. This was the first game in the Down in Flames series , and was followed by a number of expansion sets.

== Description ==
The Rise of the Luftwaffe is a card game for 2–8 players in which one side controls Allied aircraft, while the other side controls Axis fighters.

The game components include die-cut counters representing pilots, altitude, drop tanks and hit markers, and a card deck used for aircraft. Each dogfight lasts for 6 turns, and takes about 15 minutes to play.

Various scenarios are included, as well as campaign games consisting of several linked scenarios and operations.

== Publication history ==
In 1993, GMT Games published Rise of the Luftwaffe, a card-based wargame designed by Gene Billingsley, Rodger B. MacGowan, and Dan Verssen with cover art by MacGowan. It was billed as the "Volume One" in the Down in Flames series of games.

Between 1995 and 2017, GMT would publish another sixteen games in the Down in Flames series, including Eighth Air Force (1995); Winter War 1939-40 (1995); Arab-Israeli War 1948-'49 (2000); and Kuban Bridgehead (2000).

== Reception ==
In Issue 87 of the British wargaming magazine Perfidious Albion, Charles Vasey commented "Down in Flames is like all such card games an exercise in luck (do you have the right card) and very little skill. It could be improved as a game of skill ... but at the loss of realism." Vasey was unsure about the game's replayibility, noting, "Like all such games, there is a quick 'Pall Rate' but in the longer term one can see it being replayed regularly." Several issues later, Andy Dalglish noted that several aircraft with widely differing abilities had identical game stats, the Focke-Wulf Fw 190A was far too powerful for pre-1943 opposition, and the large "FW Wingman" card hands could "end an engagement before it had begun." Dalglish went on to provide several suggestions for fixing these and other problems with the game.

In Issue 22 of Paper Wars Dav Townsend noted, "The system uses cards, like Avalon Hill's Up Front or Naval War. Avoiding both the former's rule excesses and the latter's trivialization of history, the Down in Flames series provides a clever, fast-paced flavoring of World War II dogfighting."

Writing for Armchair General, Terry Lee Colemen called this "a unique game series which uses cards to portray WWII air combat ... the game is actually fairly realistic, given what it attempts to do." Coleman noted the game's simplicity, writing, "Best of all, it's a very accessible game that anyone can play – I've taught the game to complete novices and had them shooting down Spitfires and Messerschmitts in 15 minutes."

In Issue 8 of Simulacrum, Joseph Scoleri noted "As one might expect from such a system, the emphasis is on flavor rather than simulation. Nonetheless, the attention to historical detail and entertaining gameplay make the games attractive to nearly anyone interested in the era covered." In Issue 28, xxx commented, "as players become more familiar with the system, they are encouraged to run entire campaigns using expanded rules. The campaign involves planning and then executing the mission, actions which are undertaken at two distinctly separate scales."

== Reviews ==
- Casus Belli #83
- Computer Gaming World
