= Battle Cry (Avalon Hill game) =

Board wargame based on the American Civil War

Battle Cry is a board wargame based on the American Civil War, designed by Richard Borg and published by Avalon Hill in 2000.

== Description ==
While superficially similar to conventional board wargames, it borrows from miniatures wargaming with its use of plastic figures and its simplified rules. The map is initially composed of blank hexes, although additional cardboard hexes can be placed to alter the printed terrain and recreate a wide variety of battles, as per scenario instructions. The game manual includes fifteen official scenarios (battles) and Avalon Hill published three extra scenarios, called The Jackson Campaign, for the Origins 2000 and Gen Con 2000 conventions.

Players command a variety of units: infantry, cavalry, and artillery. Each unit is composed of a varying number of plastic figures. During each turn, players alternate playing cards from their hands. There are Order and Special Order cards. Order cards allow a player to activate a number of units on a specified section -left flank, center, or right flank. Special Order cards provide specific unique manipulations of game mechanics that are detailed on the card. Attacks are made by rolling a number of dice, depending on the attacking unit and any defensive terrain. Each six-sided die is labeled with each unit symbol; if the rolled symbol matches the target's unit type, a single figure is removed. A flag roll on the die forces the unit to retreat one square.

Scenarios might also use a number of the included General figures. The supplied General figures are physically identical but the scenario setup identifies each one as a historical person. The General moves separately but can be co-located in the same hex as another unit; this is the only unit stacking allowed in the game. Generals provide the benefit of allowing an advance after combat when the enemy has been either forced to retreat or completely eliminated, and they also allow a defending unit to ignore the first flag (retreat) dice rolled by the enemy.

For each opponent's unit entirely removed from the board a player receives one victory point. The player who scores the required number of victory points, as determined by the scenario instructions, is the winner.

In November 2008, a licensed online version of the game was released by GameTable Online. The online version can be played live against other online players or against a computer opponent. The game includes all of the scenarios of the original tabletop board game but lacks the ability to create unique scenarios. This version of the game is free to play.

The same game mechanics were later used in Memoir '44, published by Days of Wonder, Commands & Colors: Ancients, published by GMT Games, and Battle Lore, published by Fantasy Flight Games.

A new, updated version was published in 2013 by Wizards of the Coast for the 150th anniversary of the Civil War.

== Reception ==
According to reviewer J.C. Connors "Battle Cry's simplicity means that grognards who cut their teeth on past Avalon Hill games ... will probably find themselves unsatisfied. It's not a historical simulation ... a particular strategy that worked in real life might not be possible. But Battle Cry isn't meant to reflect those things -- it's meant to be a fast battle game with a historical flavor." The Wargamer wrote: "As it stands, straight from the box, Battle Cry is a wonderful, joyful, quick and easy to play game of the American Civil War."

Battle Cry won the 2001 International Gamers Award for General Strategy, 2-Player category.
