= Wyatt Earp (card game) =

Card game manufactured by Rio Grande Games

- Designers: Richard Borg; Mike Fitzgerald
- Publishers: Alea; Rio Grande Games; Asmodée Éditions
- Players: 2–4
- Setup time: 5 minutes
- Playing time: 60 minutes
- Chance: Medium
- Skills: Strategic thought

Wyatt Earp is a rummy-like card game first released in 2001. The game is named after Wyatt Earp, a famous lawman, and is set in the American Old West. It is manufactured by Rio Grande Games and was created by Mike Fitzgerald and Richard Borg for Alea.

== Rule summary ==
The following is a partial summary of the rules of play.

Each player tries to earn reward money by participating in the capture of seven outlaws during multiple rounds of play. Outlaws are captured through the accumulation of capture points, awarded to players who play sets or melds of cards representing the outlaws, or who play cards which build on the melds of others. Cards almost always have reward amounts associated with them; playing a card adds to the reward for the outlaw associated with the play.

As in rummy or gin rummy, a meld is three or more matching cards. In Wyatt Earp, card matches are not determined by suits; instead, cards are matched based on a color marking associated with each of the seven outlaws.

A round starts with each player being dealt ten cards, with one of the remaining cards used to establish the discard pile (face up) and the rest of the deck serving as the card supply, face down.

Each player's turn consists of three steps:

1. drawing either the top card from the discard pile or two cards from the card supply;
2. optionally playing one or more cards from their hand; and
3. discarding a card.

A round usually ends when a player discards the last card from their hand. It can also end when the card supply is exhausted again (i.e. a second time) after having been restocked once from the discard pile. Or most rarely, it ends after a player discards a card as the third step of their turn and another player, as a result of play during that turn, is left with no cards.

Capture points are assessed and reward money is distributed at the end of a round. Players with the most capture points for a given outlaw get the largest share of the reward money for that outlaw; a player gets all of an outlaw's reward money if their capture point total for that outlaw is at least five points higher than any other player's total for that outlaw.

The game ends when one player has accumulated at least $25,000 in reward money.

== Outlaw cards ==
Of the 78 cards in the deck, 49 are outlaw cards, seven of each of seven outlaws: Billy the Kid, Butch Cassidy, Bob Dalton, Wes Hardin, Jesse James, the Sundance Kid, and Belle Starr.

Outlaw cards are worth two capture points each. A meld of three must be played the first time any player lays down cards for a particular outlaw. After that, outlaw cards can be played individually, by any player, though rules encourage multiple cards to be played at a time. That's because playing a single outlaw card does not increase an outlaw's reward; playing two at a time add $1000 to the reward, playing three at a time adds $2000, and so on; in other words, the reward added for a play is (N − 1) × $1000, where N is the number of outlaw cards being played together.

== Sheriff cards ==
There are also 29 sheriff cards, which combine with the outlaw cards to form the 78-card deck used in the game. A bit more than half of the sheriff cards increase the capture points and rewards associated with an outlaw:

- Four "Bank Robbery" cards add two capture points and $1000 to the reward for an outlaw;
- Two "Stagecoach Robbery" cards add one capture point and $3000 to a reward;
- Three "Fastest Gun" cards establish an outlaw in that role (replacing any previous holder) and add three capture points and $1000 to the outlaw's reward; and
- Seven "Photo" cards, one for each outlaw, add four capture points and $1000 to their reward.

The remaining sheriff cards play other roles in the game:

- Three are "Most Wanted" cards, which let a player take a card from another player;
- Three are "Hideout" cards, used to block the capture point value of a meld of another player; and
- Seven are "Wyatt Earp" cards, which are used to add to or exchange cards in a player's hand, or to remove a hideout.

A player is allowed but not required to use only one sheriff card per turn.

Based on card type, players are sometimes required to draw, or given the option of drawing, a card in order to successfully use a sheriff card. Such a draw is considered to be an attempt to "shoot" the outlaw. If a player draws an outlaw card (which are marked with a bullet hole for this purpose), the shot is successful, and the sheriff card is played. If another sheriff card is drawn, the shot failed, and the original sheriff card has no effect. Those cards for which attempting a shot is optional have greater value when the shot is attempted and successful than the value it has when no attempt is made.

== History ==
The game was first conceived as the fourth in Mike Fitzgerald's "Mystery Rummy" series, until he decided to collaborate with Richard Borg and publish it through Alea.

Wyatt Earp won the 2001 Meeples' Choice Award. It was a finalist for the 2002 Gamers Choice Award, in the category "Best Family Card Card Game", and was nominated for the 2003 GAMES 100 Best Family Strategy game.
