= SPQR (board game) =

1992 board wargame about ancient battles

- 1st edition, cover art by Rodger B. MacGowan
- Designers: Richard Berg; Mark Herman
- Illustrators: Rodger B. MacGowan; Mark Simonitch
- Publishers: GMT Games
- Publication: 1992
- Genres: Ancient warfare

SPQR is a tactical board wargame published by GMT Games in 1992 that simulates five battles fought by the Roman Republic, and is designed to showcase the development of the legion from the Greek hoplite model to a war machine capable of conquering most of Europe and North Africa.

== Description ==
SPQR — an acronym for Senatus Populusque Romanus (Latin: "The Senate and People of Rome") — is a board wargame for two players, one of whom controls Roman legions, while the other controls the Romans' opponents. The game features five scenarios, each based on a different battle:

1. Beneventum
2. Bagradas Plains
3. Cannae
4. Zama
5. Cynoscephalae

There is also a "fantasy" scenario pitting Roman legions against Alexander the Great. There are four 22" x 34" hex grid maps on two double-sided sheets, all of them scaled at roughly 70 yards (64 m) per hex. Each battle uses a different map except "Bagradas Plains", which uses either the "Zama" or the "Cannae" map.

=== Gameplay ===
The counters represent leaders; phalanxes; heavy, medium, and light infantry; skirmishers; heavy and light cavalry; and elephants. The game uses an alternating series of turns. Before any troops can be moved, the active player must activate a leader, who then can issue line commands to a particular line of troops, or individual orders to specific units. There is no set number of turns for the game — play continues until either one army is routed, or one side fulfills their victory conditions.

== Publication history ==
In 1991, GMT Games released The Great Battles of Alexander as the first game in their "Great Battles of History" (GBoH) series. The following year, GMT published the second game in the series, SPQR, designed by Richard Berg and Mark Herman, and featuring cover art by Rodger B. MacGowan and interior art by Mark Simonitch.The game proved to be very popular and GMT published a number of expansion sets:

- Consul For Rome (1992): The Battles of the Trebia and the Metaurus
- War Elephant (1992): The Battles of Magnesia and Raphia
- Pyrrhic Victory (1993): The Battles of Heraclea and Asculum
- Africanus (1994): The Battles of Baecula and Ilipa

GMT released a second edition of SPQR with revised rules in 1994, and a French version was published by Oriflam in 1995.

In 1998, an expansion titled Jugurtha (the Battles of the Muthul and Cirta) used resources from both SPQR and another game of the GBoH series, Caesar: The Civil Wars.

In 2008, GMT released a "Deluxe Edition" that contained the second edition of SPQR as well as almost all of the expansions sets and two new scenarios, the Battle of Marathon and the Maccabean Revolt. The same year, GMT released the expansion set Barbarian that added the battles of Lautulae, Tifernum, Sentinum, Telamon and Cremona

== Reception ==
In Issue 6 of Richard Berg's Review of Games, David Spangler liked the physical components, calling the counters "not only beautiful to look at, but they are also highly functional." Spangler thought the rules were "well-written, with numerous examples and design notes to explain why a particular game mechanic is the way it is" but noted the lack of a table of contents. He was also not enamored of the index, which was grouped by topic, making it "harder to find specific topics." Spangler commented on each scenario:

- Zama: "The classic Hannibal-Scipio match-up at Zama has proven to be the most played of the battles, the one for which the players swear they've got the strategies down pat … only to learn differently next time out."
- Beneventum and Cynoscephalae: "Both provide some unusual exercises in terrain problems."
- Bagradas Plains: "Pretty much an introductory scenario, albeit one not without its charms."
- Cannae: "It's huge, with 300+ combat units to move around. It also seems pretty much improbable that any player will repeat Hannibal's success."

Spangler concluded, "Learning to sagaciously use the unique qualities of the Roman manipular legion takes some time ...The system that Mark [Herman] originally designed and which he and Richard [Berg] have refined in S.P.Q.R. is excellent in capturing the flavor, intensity, and challenge of battle in the era of the Roman Republic. For a game with such detail and chrome, S.P.Q.R. is a blast to play. I can't wait for the sequel."

In Issue 72 of the French games magazine Casus Belli, Marc Brandsma also enjoyed the physical components, noting, "I must say that the graphics of the counters, by Roger MacGowan, are pure wonder." Brandsma enjoyed the various scenarios, and added, "The abundance of counters of different origins and characteristics allows you to create many fun little scenarios yourself with a minimum of book research." Brandsma concluded, "I don't recommend you buy SPQR, I order you to!" Three years later, in Issue 85, Frédéric Bey reviewed the French version published by Oriflam and noted "The rules are version 2 of the GMT version, translated almost word for word with the obvious aim of eliminating even the slightest Anglicism. The translation is excellent and should help expand the already large circle of SPQR fans in France." In the following issue, Bey analyzed the French version in detail and liked the "great clarity in the writing of the rules; the historical insight given by the notes; the quality of the game material; and the excellence of the SPQR game system." However, Bey regretted "the 101% conformity to the American original; the density and small print of the rule booklet." Bey concluded, "Today, SPQR is the only classic wargame about antiquity available in France. Its release is therefore a real event. That is to say, it will finally allow a wide French public to take an interest in a particularly rich period of European history. Long confined to the Napoleonic epic or to contemporary wars, fans of strategy games in France will, I hope, rush to simulate the battles that presided over the development of the Western model of war."

== Awards ==
=== 1992 Origins Awards ===
- Best Best Pre-20th Century Boardgame of 1992

=== 1992 Charles S. Roberts Awards ===
- Best Pre-World War II Boardgame
- Best Wargame Graphics
