= Rome: Imperium, Circus Maximus, Hannibal vs Rome =

Rome: Imperium, Circus Maximus, Hannibal vs Rome is a 2001 board game published by GMT Games.

== Gameplay ==
Rome: Imperium, Circus Maximus, Hannibal vs Rome is a game in which a collection includes three games—covering Rome's wars, imperial expansion, and chariot racing—each offering a distinct strategic take on a different facet of the ancient Roman world.

== Reviews ==
- Pyramid
- Scrye #58
