= Labyrinth: The War on Terror, 2001 – ? =

2010 wargame board game

Labyrinth
The War on Terror, 2001–?
- Designers: Volko Ruhnke
- Illustrators: Donal Hegarty, Rodger B. MacGowan, Leland Myrick, Volko Ruhnke, Mark Simonitch
- Publishers: GMT Games
- Publication: 2010
- Genres: Wargame
- Players: 2
- Setup time: 5–15 minutes
- Playing time: 3 hours
- Chance: Medium (dice, cards)
- Skills: Strategy; Card management

Labyrinth: The War on Terror, 2001–? is a board game for one or two players, published by GMT Games in 2010.

== Gameplay ==
Players assume the role of either the United States or Islamic jihadists in an asymmetrical war of influence and military power throughout the Middle East and South East Asia. Players compete for influence, oil, and weapons of mass destruction throughout both regions. While the U.S. player generally has superior military and economic influence, the jihadi player has superior mobility and can employ unconventional tactics to overwhelm and outmaneuver the U.S. forces. The U.S. player must also contend with shifting political landscapes at home which can cause them to lose or gain abilities depending on whether the ruling party favors a "hard" or "soft" form of political influence.

In 2016, an expansion entitled Labyrinth: The Awakening: 2010–? was released with the intent to reflect the Arab Spring and add a number of new aspects to the game including local security forces, civil wars, and the Islamic State of Iraq and the Levant.

In 2020, a second expansion, entitled Labyrinth: The Forever War, 2015–? was released. It focused on geopolitical events, including the ongoing conflict against ISIL, the inauguration of Donald Trump, the U.S. withdrawal from the Iran Nuclear Deal, and international tensions with European allies, Russia, North Korea, and China.

== Development ==
Volko Ruhnke, the game's designer, began working for the CIA's Sherman Kent School for Intelligence Analysis in the 1980s and has developed several games used to train CIA officers in intelligence gathering. In May 2009, Ruhnke met with Gene Billingsley, the president of GMT Games, who proposed that Ruhnke develop a wargame that addressed current events, such as the war on terror and jihadist extremism. Inspired by the ideological contest between the U.S. and the U.S.S.R. reflected in Twilight Struggle, Ruhnke considered the competition between Western, secular ideologies, and Islamic jihadist ideologies. Ruhnke also considered the competing notions of government both ideologies possessed and how those ideologies compared to existing political structures.

== Reception ==
Labyrinth launched to mixed reviews, with some reviewers praising its efforts at historical realism, while others considered its use of the September 11 Attacks and subsequent war on terror to be overly simplistic and flawed. Many reviewers compared the game favorably to Twilight Struggle, also published by GMT Games, though several reviews opined that Labyrinth's increased complexity and less intuitive mechanics detracted from its playability. Labyrinth: Awakening launched to generally underwhelming reviews, with some reviewers considering the expansion to have been rushed and lacking in polish.

Labyrinth has also attracted scholarly attention and criticism for its attempt at portraying sensitive current events as part of its gameplay and its commentary on the evolution of wargames.

== Adaptation ==
A digital version of the game was also released on Steam by Playdek in May 2020.

== Awards and nominations ==
- 2010 Gameshark Tabletop Game of the Year
- 2010 James F. Dunnigan Design Elegance Award Winner
- 2010 Charles S. Roberts Best Post-WW2 Era Board Wargame Winner
- 2010 Charles S. Roberts Best Post-WW2 Era Board Wargame Nominee
- 2010 Charles S. Roberts Best Board Game Graphics Nominee
- 2011 JoTa Best Wargame Nominee
- 2011 JoTa Best 2-Player Board Game Nominee
- 2011 Golden Geek Best Wargame Nominee
- 2011 Golden Geek Best 2-Player Board Game Nominee
