= Ted Raicer =

Board game designer

- Occupation: Game designer

Ted S. Raicer is a game designer who has worked on board games. He became a board wargamer at the age of 12 years and has published more than 10 games based on World War I. Raicer has won many awards in his gaming career.

== Early life and career ==
Raicer became a board wargamer in 1970 at the age of 12, when his father bought him the game 1914, designed by James F. Dunnigan and published by Avalon Hill.

Raicer has published more than 10 games based on World War I, including the Paths of Glory board wargame, as well as games on World War II and the Russian Civil War.

== Awards and recognition ==
Raicer has nine Charles S. Roberts Awards, a Games magazine Historical Game of the Year Award (for Paths of Glory), and is a member of the wargamers Hall of Fame.

- 1993 - Best Historical or Scenario Magazine Article : Command #25 - When Eagles Fight: First World War in the East
- 1993 - Best Pre–World War Two Game : When Eagles Fight by XTR Corporation
- 1995 - Best Pre–World War Two Game : Great War in Europe by XTR Corporation
- 1995 - James F. Dunnigan Award for Playability and Design : Great War in Europe by XTR Corporation
- 1996 - Charles Roberts Awards Hall of Fame
- 1997 - Best Pre–World War Two Game : All Quiet on the Western Front by Moments in History
- 1999 - Best Pre–World War Two Game : Paths of Glory by GMT Games
- 1999 - James F. Dunnigan Award for Playability and Design : Paths of Glory by GMT Games
- 2002 - Best World War Two Game : Barbarossa to Berlin by GMT Games
