= Chandragupta (board game) =

Board wargame

Chandragupta Maurya
Great Battles of the Mauryan Empire, India 319-261 BC
- Copyright © Rodger B. MacGowan
- Designers: Stephen R. Welch; Richard Berg; Mark Herman
- Publishers: GMT Games LLC
- Publication: 2008
- Players: 2-4
- Setup time: 15-30 minutes
- Playing time: 1-8 hours
- Chance: Medium (Dice)
- Age range: 13 and up
- Skills: Strategy

Chandragupta is a board wargame designed by Stephen R. Welch and released in 2008 by GMT Games as part of the Great Battles of History (GBoH) series of games (designed by Richard Berg and Mark Herman) on ancient warfare. Chandragupta simulates battles fought by the Mauryan Dynasty in ancient India, and in so doing, attempts to illuminate the features, challenges, and unique attributes of the Indian military system and culture during this period.

== Gameplay ==
The game is a traditional Hex-and-counter style game. The game maps are covered with a hexagonal grid, each hex representing 70 yards of distance. Each turn represents about 15–20 minutes, although the rules are designed assuming a loose time scale. Each counter represents 300 to 1000 fighting troops, depending on size and type. Since little is known about the terrain, numbers of men or types of units engaged, methods of combat, leaders and so on, these games, despite their high level of detail, remain essentially speculative and fictional in nature.

Play of Chandragupta follows the general sequence of the other hex-and-counter style board games, each player taking turns moving units, conducting combat, and resolving combat using an odds-based combat results table (CRT) using a die. As with the other games in the GBoH series, rules for leadership and command and control are emphasized, and players have the opportunity (depending upon leader quality) to conduct "extra" moves and/or "trump" an opponent, effectively cancelling activation of an opponent's leader. Combat results generally result in rout and/or retreat, and victory is achieved by (more commonly) forcing an opponent's army to quit the field when a certain threshold of losses has been achieved, or by (less commonly) obtaining a specific territorial objective.

== Indian Military System ==
Using period sources as well as research from largely Indian military historians, Chandragupta attempts to model specific features of what is believed to have been common features of the Mauryan military system. One of the most distinctive features is the catarangubala, or the "four-fold" army consisting of foot-soldiers (patti), car-warriors, or chariots (rathin), elephants (hastī), and cavalry (aśva). Deployment of the catarangubala remained remarkably consistent throughout the period following the Vedic period (after which chariots and elephants came into full military use), through Arab invasion in the 7th century AD. The game simulates the catarungabala by representing the four divisions with distinctive counters whose use in play is governed by specific rules for movement, combat, and command-and-control.

Another feature of the ancient Indian military system simulated in Chandragupta are rules for troop classes, based on a classification system with a long tradition preceding the Mauryan era. The classifications were hierarchical. At the apex of the hierarchy were the Maula or "hereditary" troops, who were professional soldiers and largely (though not exclusively) of the Kshatriya warrior-caste. Next where the Bhrta, or mercenary-class of troops, followed by the shrenis (śreṇī) or shrenibala (śreṇībala), who were essentially armed trade-guild levies, and lastly the Atavibalam, or "tribal" levies. The game Chandragupta attempts to simulate the differing qualities of morale, leadership, and fighting ability of these various troop classes. Other sub-classes, such as Mitra and Amitra (deserters from enemy armies, prison conscripts and the like), but for interests of playability and simplicity the designers chose not to represent these additional classes in Chandragupta.

== Scenarios ==
Chandragupta has ten scenarios which simulate major battles from the founding of the Mauryan Dynasty under Chandragupta Maurya, through the Battle of Kalinga waged by Chandragupta's grandson, Ashoka:

- Pataliputra, ca 319 BCE – Chandragupta's first attempt to overthrow the Nanda dynasty, under the leadership of his mentor, the Brahmin Chanakya. This inaugural battle did not go well for Chandragupta, as he and his insurgents brashly attacked the capital without having consolidated their power base among the "hereditary" (i.e. Maula) military class. By all accounts they were defeated, forcing them to regroup in the countryside to build up their military strength and political support. The game posits a set-piece battle, with the Nandan imperial army facing down a rebellion of Chandragupta's mercenaries and allied insurgents on the plains outside of Pataliputra, the capital city of Magadha.
- Magadha, ca 317 BC—Though Ugrasena Nanda apparently was a great conqueror and able ruler, his rich and powerful sons were not. As Ugrasena grew older, his sons' greed and corruption became intolerable. Using this as well as the Nanda's lowness of birth to drum up popular support of their rebellion, Chanakya and Chandragupta began to broaden their anti-Nanda coalition among the freedom-loving clans and princes of Punjab and Sindh, most of whom had given stout resistance to the foreign invader Alexander, they find the military support they had been seeking, this time with the help of the chieftain Parvataka and his brother Vairodhaka. The game speculates that the battle took place near a military camp, and provides a model of an ancient Indian military camp on the mapboard.
- Revolt of Malayaketu, ca 317 BC—This scenario is based on events from the play Mudrarakshasa, which, per Bhargava, was "probably based on events which actually occurred". Having won power with the help of independent tribes and principalities, Chandragupta promptly evades the pre-war promises he had made them. Betrayed, the tribal chieftains rise against Chandragupta. The revolt is led by the son of Parvataka, named Malayaketu, with the help of five other chiefs and an ex-minister of the Nanda regime named Rakshasa. Chanakya gets to work, employing "cunning" against the rebels, e.g. he has several of Malayaketu's allies poisoned and uses guile to sow dissension among the tribes. The game uses the Indian military camp, as described by Kautilya in the Arthashastra, as the centerpiece of the scenario. The designers posit an attack by Chanakya upon the camp at night.
- Takshashila, ca 316 BC—After overthrowing the Nandas, Chandragupta had to justify his new dynasty by proving it able to secure the protection of the people against foreign invasion by the Greeks. Takshashila (aka "Taxila" in Greek) was at the time under the joint rule of the Indian king Ambhi, who had allied himself years earlier with Alexander against his rival king Puru ("Porus" of Hydaspes fame), and the Thracian general Eudemus, a successor of Philip. When Eudamus treacherously has Puru murdered, a native revolt begins. Chandragupta transforms the revolt into an organized military action against Takshashila. Eudamus is not committed to this battle – his joint rule with Ambhi was meant to be temporary, but his permanent appointment as satrap was never made. He quits India to later help Eumenes in his fight against Antipater, and the remaining Greek officers remaining are put to the sword.

The battle takes place in the valley of the Tamra Nala river, bounded by rugged hills overlooking Takshashila from the east. The centerpiece of the terrain is the city itself – the walled city, with four gated entrances, surrounding dense city blocks of congested dwellings. In the center of the city is its temple and palace. The game map is based upon topographical maps drawn by archaeologist J. M. Marshall's A Guide to Taxila.

- Gandhara, 304 BC—According to Grainger, after his stalemate with Antigonus in 308, Seleucus conquers Bactria and then proceeds to Gandhara on India's western frontier. Marching through Oxyartes' satrapy of Paropamisadae and then down the Kabul River, he crosses at the confluence of the Indus somewhere in the vicinity of modern Attock in Pakistan. On the east bank of the Indus Chandragupta confronts him. With his back to the river, Seleucus fought to what was possibly a tactical draw, but it was a strategic loss. Having gambled so far from home but failing to achieve a victory, Seleucus is "gifted" 500 war elephants from the Mauryan emperor in exchange for the surrender of his possessions in the Indus valley, Arachosia, and Gedrosia. Sources suggest that the cession of these territories were treated as the dower of Seleucus' daughter in her marriage to Chandragupta's son, Bindusara.

The game deploys Seleucus squeezed close to the sands and mud of the Indus River at his back, leaving him with little room to maneuver.

- Revolt in the Provinces, ca 275 BC—From the Buddhist narratives Divyavadana, it is related that Chandragupta's grandson Ashoka, while proconsul of Takshashila, was commissioned by his father Bindusara with the task of restoring order during a popular revolt against "wicked officials" (i.e. high-handed oppression by local ministers). The "official" history takes pains to reassure that the people were not opposed to the "Kumara [prince] or even king Bindusara."

The designer of Chandragupta (the game) opted to design the scenario with the premise speculating that the aging Chanakya, as viceroy of Takshashila, is faced with an uprising by the city's merchant class. Chanakya's forces occupy a portion of the city; the "rebel" forces – a coalition of śreṇī – occupy part of the city, and its gates and the roads leading to it. Ashoka, with a force of Maula, must rescue the beleaguered Chanakya.

- Suppression of the Khashas ca 274 BC—Though he was hailed as "Slayer of Enemies," Chandragupta's son Bindusara was friendly with the Hellenic world and was known to have had a taste for Greek figs, wine, and philosophy. Little is known, however, about the military conquests of Bindusara. He is generally thought to have consolidated (if not expanded) his father's empire, but from the chronicles of Taranatha, we are told that Bindusara "destroyed kings and nobles of about sixteen cities" in the rebellious Khasa rajya, or realm of the Khashas. The Khashas, whose settlements in the former kingdom of Puru extended from Jhelum to the west of Kashmir, were likely independent principalities united by clan or tribal connections who chafed at Mauryan imperial power.

The game sets the hypothetical battles among tribal strongholds on rugged mountain terrain. According to Sastri the Khashas' strongholds were West of the Jhelum ("Hydaspes") River, though the historical locations of these battles are not known. We have opted to "condense" what was probably a series of scattered revolt suppressions into two scenarios.

- Battle of Kalinga, 261 BC—Ashoka was the proconsul of Takshashila prior to his ascension to the throne, which he seized – as legend has it – as outcome of a fratricidal struggle that he waged after his father became ill. There is no clear evidence, but some scholars suggest that Ashoka is the son of Bindusara and the Greek princess Helen, daughter of Seleucus.

Chandragupta and Chanakya had been hostile to non-monarchial states. Many such states, quasi-democratic oligarchies as well as republics, had been weakened by the wars with Alexander, and that weakness made possible the eventual hegemony of the Mauryan Empire. Thus, the Mauryans had always kept a wary eye on Kalinga. A large and fiercely independent saņgha (republic), Kalinga had been originally conquered by Ugrasena Nanda, but regained its independence during the rule of Sahalya, and remained so until the reign of Ashoka Maurya. Eight years after his anointment, Ashoka marched on Kalinga. On a battlefield near the village of Dhauli the Kalingan army was defeated. Records affirm that 100 thousand were slain, 150 thousand were deported (enslaved), and many times that number died thereafter. It is said that the river Daya nearby ran red with the blood of the slain. After the battle Ashoka ascended the hillocks to survey the field he had won; at twilight he saw heaps of dismembered bodies of soldiers and animals, heard the cries of wounded, witnessed the anguish of women searching the dead for their husbands and sons. As the story is told, the slaughter filled Ashoka with such anguish he changed from Chandashoka ("Ashoka the Terrible") to Dharmashoka ("Ashoka the Pious"), and converted to Buddhism. For this scenario, the game uses two mapboards as the scene of a large set-piece battle. The terrain represented is based upon topographical maps of the area near Dhauli Hill, the historical battle site and now a Buddhist shrine.

== Expansions ==
An expansion was printed in C3i Magazine, published by RBM Publications (Rodger B. MacGowan, Editor & Publisher), which provided two "alternative history" scenarios. The first, "Ganges River," speculates a battle between the army of Alexander the Great and the Nandan army at the banks of the Ganges River (which did not happen historically due to the mutiny of Alexander's troops at the Beas River), and the second, "Magnesia," a hypothetical show-down between the Mauryan army of Ashoka and the Roman Republic in Asia Minor.

== See also ==
- Tabletop game
- Tactical wargame
- GMT Games
- Military History of India
- Chandragupta Maurya
- Ashoka
- Bindusara
- Chanakya
- Maurya Empire
- Seleucus I Nicator

== Bibliography ==
Bhargava, P.L. Chandragupta Maurya : A Gem of Indian History (New Delhi: DK Printworld, 1996).

Chakravarti, P.C. The Art of War in Ancient India (New Delhi: Low Price Publications, 1993).

Das, H.C., Military History of Kalinga (Calcutta: Punthi Pustak, 1986).

Dikshitar, V.R. Ramachandra. War in Ancient India (Delhi: Motilal Banarsidass, 1987).

Kautilya, Arthashastra. Translated by S. Sastri, Mysore, 1923.

Majumdar, Bimal Kanti. The Military System in Ancient India (Calcutta: Firma K.L. Mukhopadhyay, 1960).

Marshall, Sir John Hubert. A Guide to Taxila (Cambridge: Cambridge University Press, 1960).

McCrindle, John W. Ancient India as Described by Megasthenes and Arrian (New Delhi: Munshiram Manoharlal Publishers, 2000).

Narain, A.K., The Indo-Greeks (Delhi: B.R. Publishing Corporation, 2003).

Sastri, K.A. Nilakanta, The Age of the Nandas and Mauryas (Delhi: Motilal Banarsidass Publishers, 1988).

Scullard, The Elephant in Greek and Roman World (Ithaca: Cornell University Press, 1974)

Tarn, W.W., The Greeks in Bactria and India (Edinburgh: Munshiram Manoharlal Publishers, 1980).

Thaplyal, Kiran Kumar and Shive Nandan Misra eds, Select Battles in Indian History (Delhi: AgamKala Prakashan, 2002). 2 vols.

Waddell, L.A., Report on the Excavations at Pataliputra (Patna) (New Delhi: Asian Educational Services, 1996).

Welch, Stephen R., "The Rise of the Mauryan Empire," C3i Magazine, ed. Rodger B. McGowan (Nr. 22, 2009).

Welch, Stephen R., "Scenario Book," Chandragupta: Great Battles of the Mauryan Empire, India 319-261 BC (GMT Games, LLC, 2008).

Welch, Stephen R., "Rules of Play," Chandragupta: Great Battles of the Mauryan Empire, India 319-261 BC (GMT Games, LLC, 2008).
