= Hannibal: Rome vs. Carthage =

Board wargame

- Designers: Mark Simonitch
- Publishers: Avalon Hill
- Publication: 1996
- Genres: Ancient history

Hannibal: Rome vs. Carthage is a card-driven board war game published by Avalon Hill in 1996 that simulates the Second Punic War between Carthage and Rome.

== Background ==
During the Second Punic War, Hannibal took his Carthaginian army against the might of Rome, marching through the Alps in 218 BCE to begin a seven-year sweep through Italy, where he routed Roman forces and sought alliances among Rome's oppressed allies. The tide turned against Carthage with the arrival of Scipio Africanus in 211 BCE.

== Description ==
Hannibal: Rome vs. Carthage is a two-player game in which one player controls Roman forces while the second player controls the forces of Carthage.

=== Components ===
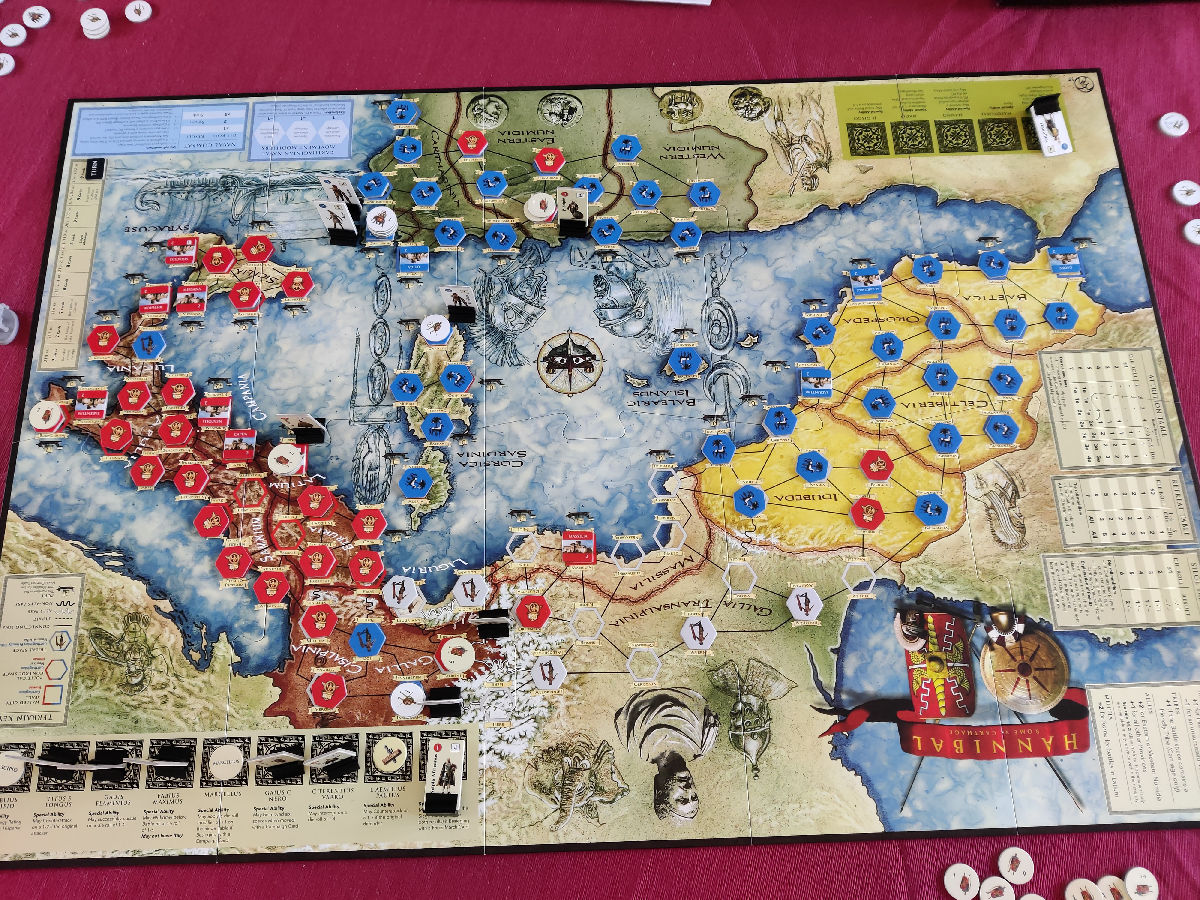
Map board

The game box includes a 22" x 34" point-to-point map of the Western Mediterranean basin, 200 counters, 14 plastic stands for generals and consuls, a deck of 112 cards and a 16-page rulebook.

=== Gameplay ===
Each turn has four phases:

1. Reinforcements: Receive reinforcements. Defeated generals (except Hannibal) can re-enter the game.
2. Strategy: Strategy cards are dealt and then played alternately. Each card can either place Political Control (PC) markers, move generals and troops, or cause special events.
3. Attrition and Political Isolation: Armies get reduced in unfriendly territory, unsupported PC markers are removed, and — using cards for both movement and combat resolution.

The game features point-to-point movement rather than a hex grid. Carthage has five generals who remain the same throughout the game. Rome has three generals, but two must be chosen each turn from a pool of eight consuls. Late in the game, Scipio Africanus becomes a fourth general for Rome.

=== Victory conditions ===
Rome wins if Hannibal is eliminated or Carthage is captured. Carthage wins if Rome is captured. Otherwise, the player with the most political points at the end of the game is the winner. If there is a tie, Carthage, with fewer resources, is the winner.

== Publication history ==
In 1993, Mark Herman designed and Avalon Hill published the card-driven wargame We the People. Three years later, Mark Simonitch designed Hannibal: Rome vs. Carthage using rules similar to We the People, and it was published by Avalon Hill in 1996.

== Reception ==
Pyramid stated that "Hannibal is an exciting development from Avalon Hill: a low-complexity wargame that holds the interest of both experienced and novice gamers. Most of their previous low-complexity wargames had a low replay ability for old-timers; not so Hannibal."

In Issue 8 of Zone of Control, John A. Walker liked the various systems used in the game for unit-raising and alliances. Walker also liked the flexibility of having three uses for every strategy card. Walker concluded by giving this game grades of "Excellent" for gameplay and "Good" for historicity, saying, "Hannibal is a great game [with] much more appeal and crossover potential than the typical wargame."

== Other reviews and commentary ==
- Backstab
- Game Trade Magazine
- Casus Belli #096
