= COIN (board game) =

Genre of asymmetric strategy board wargames

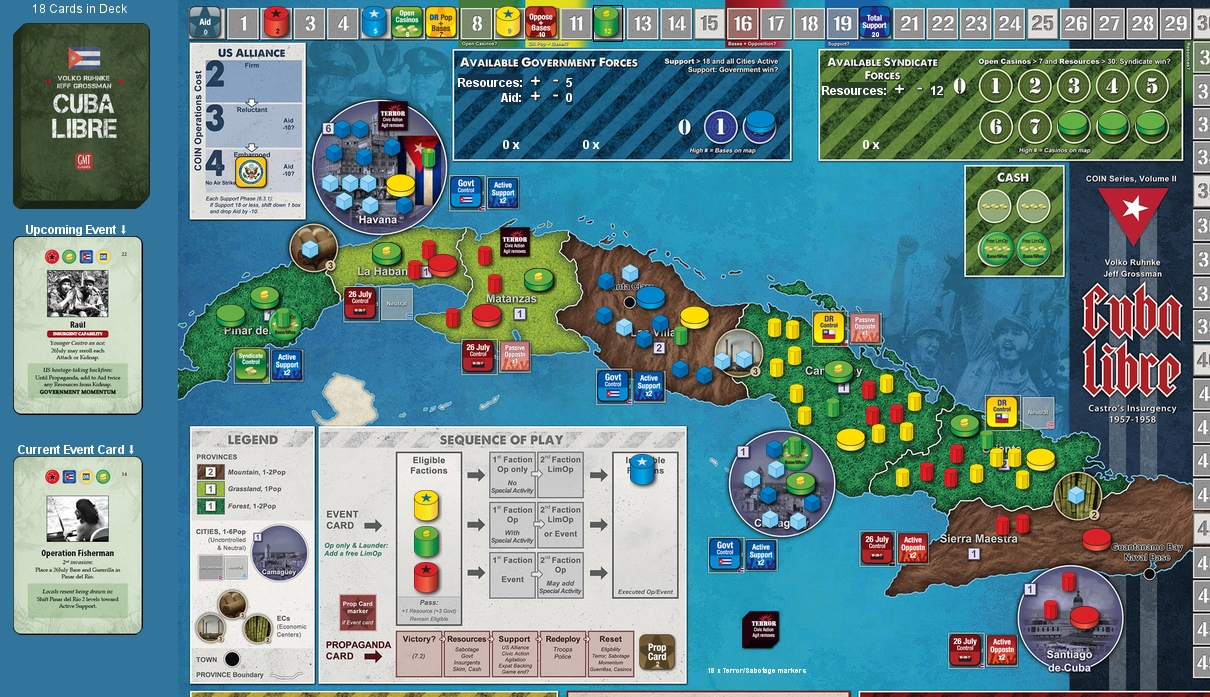
A game of Cuba Libre in progress; played using a Vassal module.

COIN (short for COunterINsurgency) is a series of multiplayer asymmetric strategy board wargames simulating historic insurgency and counter-insurgency conflicts and irregular warfare throughout the world. It is published by GMT Games. It consists of the main series of games, numbered as volumes, and the spinoff Irregular Conflicts series ("ICS") games, which apply similar game mechanics and counterinsurgency framing of the main series to events that would not be traditionally described as insurgencies.

The series has been noted for its innovative and dynamic gameplay, compared to more traditional hex-and-counter two-player wargames.

== Game ==
COIN games simulate past and ongoing historical insurgencies and counter-insurgencies with up to four players controlling a different faction, each with unique play styles and winning conditions. All games in the COIN series share the same underlying system first found in Andean Abyss, the original game of the series, designed by game designer and CIA national security analyst Volko Ruhnke.

COIN games use variable turn order. For example, in Andean Abyss, players draw from a deck of event cards to decide the order in which factions take turns. Meanwhile, in Colonial Twilight (a two-player game), one player holds the initiative until that player performs an action that gives the initiative to the other player. In addition to event cards, the games use mechanics like area control and opportunity cost to represent factors such as winning hearts and minds, lines of communication, and government legitimacy.

Non-player rules are included for each faction, enabling a non-player-controlled faction to participate in the game based on a predetermined set of actions. The earlier COIN games used flowcharts to determine non-player procedures, while games in the series since Gandhi have included a small deck of cards with non-player actions.

List of COIN games
Volume	Title	Published	Conflict
I	Andean Abyss	2012	Colombian conflict
II	Cuba Libre	2013	Cuban Revolution
III	A Distant Plain	2013	War in Afghanistan (2001–2021)
IV	Fire in the Lake	2014	Vietnam War
V	Liberty or Death: The American Insurrection	2016	American Revolutionary War
VI	Falling Sky: The Gallic Revolt Against Ceasar	2016	Gallic Wars
VII	Colonial Twilight: The French-Algerian War, 1954-62	2017	Algerian War
VIII	Pendragon: The Fall of Roman Britain	2017	End of Roman rule in Britain
IX	Gandhi: The Decolonization of British India, 1917-1947	2018	Indian independence movement
X	All Bridges Burning: Red Revolt and White Guard in Finland, 1917–1918	2020	Finnish Civil War
N/A	The British Way: Counterinsurgency at the End of Empire	2023	British decolonization
XI	People Power: Insurgency in the Philippines, 1981-1986	2023	People Power Revolution
XII	Red Dust Rebellion	2024	Fictional conflict following colonization of Mars
XIII	China's War 1937-41	2025	Second Sino-Japanese War
XIV	The Pure Land: Ōnin War in Muromachi Japan, 1465-1477	forthcoming	Warring States Period
XV	A Fading Star: Insurgency and Piracy in Somalia	forthcoming	Somali civil war c. 2007

List of ICS games
Published	Title	Subject matter
2024	Vijayanagara: The Deccan Empires of Medieval India, 1290-1398	Founding of the Vijayanagara Empire
2024	A Gest Of Robin Hood	Robin Hood legend
2024	Cross Bronx Expressway	Mid-20th-century New York urban development
forthcoming	Echo from the Dark	Fictional conflict following the invention of faster-than-light travel
