= Dan Verssen =

American wargame designer

Dan Verssen is an American wargame designer who in 2002 founded Dan Verssen Games in Glendora, California. Verssen is credited as the designer of over 100 board games or game items. His first game design Modern Naval Battles, which was published by 3W Games in 1989, won several awards including the 1989 Charles S. Roberts Award for "Best Post–World War Two or Modern Game". He started designing games while he was in high school. Verssen has also designed games for companies such as Avalon Hill, GMT Games, Decision Games, and Alderac Entertainment Group. His wife Holly is often the developer of his games.
