= Commands & Colors: Ancients =

Board wargame

- Commands & Colors: Ancients
- Designers: Richard Borg; Pat Kurivial; Roy Grider
- Publishers: GMT Games
- Players: 2
- Setup time: ~15 minutes per scenario
- Playing time: 20 minutes - 2 hours
- Chance: Medium
- Age range: 12-
- Skills: Hand management, Strategy
- Website: http://www.gmtgames.com/

Commands & Colors: Ancients is a board wargame designed by Richard Borg, Pat Kurivial, and Roy Grider, and published by GMT Games in 2006. It is based on Borg's Commands & Colors system using some elements similar to his other games such as Commands & Colours: Napoleonics, The Great War, Memoir '44 and Battle Cry designed to simulate the "fog of war" and uncertainty encountered on real battlefields.

Commands & Colors: Ancients focuses on the historic period of 3000 BC - 400 AD.

== Components ==
The core game includes several hundred wood blocks in two colors for the Roman/Syracusan armies and Carthaginian army. Sheets of stickers representing different unit types must be affixed to the blocks prior to initial play. 16 small wooden blocks representing "victory banners" and 7 larger plastic dice must also have stickers applied. Extra stickers are included for use as replacements. The game also contains a full-color rule book, color scenario book, and two color two-page double-sided "cheat sheets" for players to reference during play for dice results and unit statistics. The board is folded card stock laid flat for play. Hexagonal terrain pieces are laid on the board when called for by a scenario. A deck of command cards is included.

== Gameplay ==
Units are arranged on the board according to maps and scenario descriptions in the scenario book. Players are dealt a number of command cards equal to their "command value" for the chosen scenario. Often players have different command values and therefore different numbers of cards. Players take turns playing their cards to "order" units, generally allowing the ordered units to move and conduct combat. Cards often refer to a section of the battlefield, either left, center, or right, or some combination of these. There are also many special cards that allow very specific actions. Play continues until one player earns the requisite number of victory banners for the scenario. Victory banners are earned each time a player completely eliminates an enemy unit or leader.

== Expansions ==
Six expansions have been released for Commands & Colors: Ancients.

- Ancients Expansion #1: Greece & Eastern Kingdoms
- Ancients Expansion #2: Rome and the Barbarians
- Ancients Expansion #3: The Roman Civil Wars
- Ancients Expansion #4: Imperial Rome
- Ancients Expansion #5: Epic Ancients II
- Ancients Expansion #6: The Spartan Army

== Awards ==
Commands & Colors: Ancients won the 2006 Origins Award for Historical Board Game of the Year, the 2007 BoardGameGeek Golden Geek Award for Best 2-player Game, and was a nominee for the 2006 Charles S. Roberts Award for Best Pre-World War II Boardgame.
