= Sword of Rome =

Board game

- Designers: Wray Ferrell
- Publishers: GMT Games
- Publication: 2004
- Genres: Historical
- Players: 2-5

Sword of Rome is a board game for 2-5 players, designed by Wray Ferrell and first published in 2004 by GMT Games. A second edition, which expanded the game to support five players, was published in 2010.

== Reception ==
It was awarded the 2004 Origins Award for Best Historical Board Game.
