= Paths of Glory (board game) =

1999 strategy board game

The First World War, 1914–1918
- Game cover, featuring the names of several battles of the war, such as the battles of Verdun and Passchendaele
- Designers: Ted Raicer
- Illustrators: Mark Simonitch
- Publishers: GMT Games
- Players: Twosome
- Setup time: 15–30 minutes
- Playing time: 6–14 hours
- Chance: Some (card drawing, and die rolls for combat)
- Age range: 14+
- Skills: Strategy; Card management

Paths of Glory: The First World War, 1914–1918 is a strategy board wargame, designed in 1999 by the six-time Charles S. Roberts Awards winner Ted Raicer and published by GMT Games. It covers World War I from its outbreak to the 1918 Armistice, or based on the progress of the game a hypothetical later ending of the war in early 1919, possibly due to exhaustion of Europe. The game is played on a map of Europe and the Middle East as the game board.

== Gameplay ==
Unlike many other wargames with hex maps, this game uses a point-to-point system, with all spaces costing one movement point to move between, difficult terrain (e.g. the Pripet Marshes or the Alps) being represented by fewer links between spaces. A unit may not both move and attack in the same activation. Most game turns represent seasons, although there are a few extra turns to allow more manoeuvre in the summer and autumn of 1914. Counters represent corps and armies, counters for the latter being physically larger and attacking on a more favourable table to represent artillery support. Corps may be deployed on the map as needed, or kept in the off-map "reserve box". Armies which take losses are also replaced by corps from the reserve box, or are permanently eliminated if no such corps is available, so a player must be careful to keep enough corps in reserve. Most minor countries (except the Serbs and Belgians) have only corps-sized counters. Up to three units (of any size) may stack in a space.

An attacker attacking from multiple spaces may attempt a "flank attack". If successful, the attacker attacks first, only after which can the now weakened defender fire back – the opposite is the case if the flank attack fails. This tends to be a key tactic on the more mobile Eastern Front. Players may dig "trenches" under their counters, which besides weakening the attacker, strengthening the defender and making the defender immune from flank attacks, also allow defeated forces to avoid retreat at the cost of extra casualties, thus potentially making a densely packed Western Front as immobile as it was in reality. Certain other forms of terrain (e.g. mountains) also have similar powers to trenches. The map also contains numerous printed fortresses (e.g. Liege, Antwerp, Verdun, Pryzmysl, Riga), which may be destroyed in combat or besieged.

Stringent supply restrictions – units out of supply may not be activated for movement or combat, and are permanently eliminated if supply is not restored – force players to try to keep continuous lines. Multinational attacks are subject to the restriction that one stack must contain units of each attacking nationality, so a major Allied offensive on the Western Front – to achieve greater attacking strength and to spread the casualties – might require 3 or 4 operations points to activate. The Central Powers are subject to the same restrictions, but have some cards (Sud Army and 11th Army) which allow greater German-Austro-Hungarian co-operation.

The game also features an innovative card-driven system where each card may be used for one of four distinct actions: operations (movement or major offensives – cards vary from 2 to 5 in value), strategic redeployment, replacement points (rebuilding units after combat losses) or special events (see below). There are three separate decks of cards (Mobilisation, Limited War and Total War – the last contains events which happened late in the real war, and also has a slightly higher average value for operations points, representing a higher level of industrial mobilisation), the latter two being added to the deck in the course of the game.

Each turn each player draws a hand of seven cards, and must take six actions, one of which must be a randomly determined "Mandated Offensive", representing political pressure to make an attack which s/he might otherwise not have chosen, and which might even be quite inadvisable. For the Allies, a French or Italian Mandatory Offensive is twice as likely as a British or Russian one. After the German player has played the "French Mutiny" Event, French units are instead unable to attack (unless stacked with a US unit) on turns in which a French mandated offensive is rolled. The Central Powers are also subject to Mandatory Offensives (e.g. a Turkish offensive or an Austro-Hungarian offensive against Italy), but German Mandatory Offensives on the Western Front are less likely as the game progresses and Hindenburg and Ludendorff (and Max Hoffmann in the East) are deemed, via play of the relevant cards, to have taken control of Germany's war effort.

Special card events play a key role in the game, and ensure that many of the historical events of the First World War take place, if not necessarily in the same order as they occurred in reality. They include the raising of fresh armies, the entry of neutral countries or the descent of Russia by stages to the Fall of the Tsar, the Bolshevik seizure of power and the Treaty of Brest-Litovsk. American entry is also determined by the play of event cards, is only possible after Russia has become a democracy (hence historically in the spring of 1917) and does not always occur. It is perfectly possible that the Tsar might fall but the Bolsheviks never seize power, or that the USA might enter the war but never deploy its armies to Europe. Countries may only enter the war (if at all) on the side which they took in the actual war, i.e. Italy, Greece and Rumania (which might potentially have joined either side in reality) can only join the Allies, while Germany cannot attack neutral Holland (which is not even shown on the game map).

If a card is played for its special event, it is removed from the game, so the pack of available cards gradually diminishes as the game progresses. A player may also automatically make a single activation without the need to play a card, which may be necessary if s/he has played most of the cards out of their hand (e.g. through playing too many combat cards), or if s/he is trying to retain a key card in their hand for use on a future turn. Cards with key events are also likely to have high values for Operations and Replacement points, requiring a player to make critical choices each turn in managing their hand of cards.

Other special event cards include particular key offensives, such as the Russian Brusilov or Kerensky Offensives, the German Verdun, Michael and Blücher Offensives or the Allied Gallipoli and Salonika landings. Other events include the sortie of the German High Seas Fleet (which may be defeated by play of the British "Grand Fleet" Card – statistically roughly a one in three chance of the Allies holding that card at the time) and German Unrestricted U-Boat Warfare, which prevents deployment of US or British reinforcements until defeated by play of the Allied "Convoy" Card.

Other cards may be used to affect the outcome of combat rolls. These include able generals such as Kemal, Otto von Below, or Putnik, or new weapons such as poison gas, mine attacks, flamethrowers or tanks (the latter only available after the Allied player has first played the "Landships" card, which has no effect but represents the first ineffective use of tanks in 1916). Each side has an "air superiority" combat card, which may appear at various times during the game, reflecting fluctuations in air superiority. Whereas many combat cards are one-off events, removed from play after a single use, several Allied combat cards (tanks, mines, hurricane bombardments) may be repeatedly drawn from the deck, and allow the Allies to gain a slight tactical edge in the latter part of 1918 as they are drawn more frequently from the small number of cards remaining in the game.

Victory is determined by control of objective spaces. If the game follows historical lines, the Germans will gain objectives in Russia and Rumania, while the Allies will gain objectives in Turkish-held Palestine and Mesopotamia. The Allies will also gain a few victory points from their blockade of Germany and from events such as the Lusitania Sinking, but will still need to recapture some German-held objectives in Belgium if they are to reach their historical victory level. However the rules also suggest that in competitive play players bid to pay the highest victory point handicap for the privilege of playing the Allies, suggesting that the Central Powers, who have to juggle multiple fronts with limited resources, are in fact the harder side to play.

== Tournament scenario ==
The game includes a historical scenario that is used in competitive play. Based on ten years of conference and PBEM play, the scenario was designed to provide a balanced playing experience and provide incentives to pursue historical strategies. Meaningful changes include:

- Revised VP spaces. The Near East has been de-emphasized while additional VP spaces have been added in the west.
- Revised replacement rules. The CP player is now rewarded for holding a forward position in the west.
- Limitations on armies in Italy other than the AH and IT. This limits the ability of the CP to swamp Italy early.
- Additional VP awards/penalties for knocking Russia out of the war or failing to get the US into the war.

== Competitive events ==
Numerous organized competitions exist that support play of Paths of Glory including:

- World Boardgame Championships: Held in late July, this face-to-face event features a single-elimination tournament with a mulligan round.
- PrezCon Winter Nationals: Occurring in late February, this face-to-face tournament is a single-elimination tournament with a mulligan round.
- BPA PBEM Tournament: Occurring every two or three years, this play-by-email event is sponsored by the Boardgame Players Association. Previously a 'flights of three' format, the latest event is a double-elimination event.
- European Championship: Occurring every two or three years, this play-by-email event was originally conceived as an event supporting EU-based players but has recently been opened to a global pool of participants.

== Awards ==
The game has won the 1999 Charles S. Roberts Awards for Best Pre-World War II Boardgame, the 2000 International Gamers Award, and the Games 100 Best Historical Simulation Game in 2001.

== Expansions and related games ==
In 2001 GMT released the add-on Paths of Glory Player's Guide, which is a 48-page booklet containing articles with tips, tactics, strategies and game variants. In addition it includes 20 new cards and a 1/4 sheet of additional counters.

The GMT game Barbarossa to Berlin by Ted Raicer covers the Second World War in Europe, 1941–5, with a very similar game system.

The game "Pursuit of Glory" by Brad Stock and Brian Stock, covering the First World War against the Ottoman Empire in greater detail, was published by GMT Games in 2008. Another spin-off game, "Illusions of Glory," covering the Italian, Eastern, and Balkan Fronts in more detail, was published by GMT Games in 2017.

The sixth printing was released in December 2018 and introduced a new map based on the tournament scenario, revised counters, incorporated errata, and several new playing aids.
