= International Gamers Award =

Award for board games

The International Gamers Awards (IGAs) is an award for strategy board games and historical simulation games.

The IGAs "were created to recognize outstanding games and designers, as well as the companies that publish them."

Year	Best multiplayer strategy game	Best 2-player strategy game	Best historical simulation game	Best solo game
2025	SETI: Search for Extraterrestrial Intelligence	Lord of the Rings: Duel for Middle-Earth		Star Trek: Captain's Chair
2024	Nucleum	Sky Team		Imperium: Horizons
2023	Revive	Oranienburger Kanal		Earth
2022	Carnegie	Ark Nova		Cascadia
2021	Lost Ruins of Arnak	My City		Under Falling Skies
2020	Barrage			
2019	Root	Lincoln		
2018	Rajas of the Ganges	Codenames: Duet		
2017	Great Western Trail	Arkham Horror: The Card Game		
2016	Mombasa	7 Wonders Duel		
2015	The Voyages of Marco Polo	Wir sind das Volk		
2014	Russian Railroads	Limes		
2013	Terra Mystica	Le Havre: The Inland Port		
2012	Trajan	Agricola: All Creatures Big and Small		
2011	7 Wonders	A Few Acres of Snow		
2010	Age of Industry	Campaign Manager 2008		
2009	Le Havre	Day & Night		
2008	Agricola	1960: The Making of the President	Asia Engulfed	
2007	Through the Ages	Mr. Jack	A Victory Lost	
2006	Caylus	Twilight Struggle	Twilight Struggle	
2005	Ticket to Ride Europe	War of the Ring	Sword of Rome	
2004	Saint Petersburg	Memoir '44	Lock and Load	
2003	Age of Steam and Puerto Rico (co-winners)	Lord of the Rings: The Confrontation	Hammer of the Scots	
2002	San Marco	DVONN	Wilderness War	
2001	The Princes of Florence	Battle Cry	Drive on Paris	
2000	Tikal	Lost Cities	Paths of Glory	
