= Memoir '44 =

Board game

- Designers: Richard Borg
- Illustrators: Julien Delval, Cyrille Daujean
- Publishers: Days of Wonder
- Publication: 2004
- Languages: English, French, German (cards only)
- Players: 2 players, 2 teams of up to 3 players or 2 teams of up to 4 for with two copies
- Setup time: 10 minutes
- Playing time: 30–60 minutes
- Chance: Medium
- Age range: 8 +
- Skills: Dice rolling, Hand management

Memoir '44 is a light wargame or war-themed strategy board game for two players. It was created by Richard Borg and published in 2004 by Days of Wonder. Illustration done by Julian Deveil and Cyrrile Dejuan. The game can be played with up to six players if played in teams and up to eight players in the "Overlord" scenarios. However, "Overlord" requires two copies of the game. It received the 2004 International Gamers Award for General Strategy, 2-Player category and The Wargamer 2004 Award for Excellence. The game is published in English and French (as Mémoire 44) by Days of Wonder.

Memoir '44 simulates over a dozen of the battles connected with the D-Day invasions in World War II. It uses an enhanced version of the same Command & Colors game system as found in Battle Cry.

== Gameplay summary ==
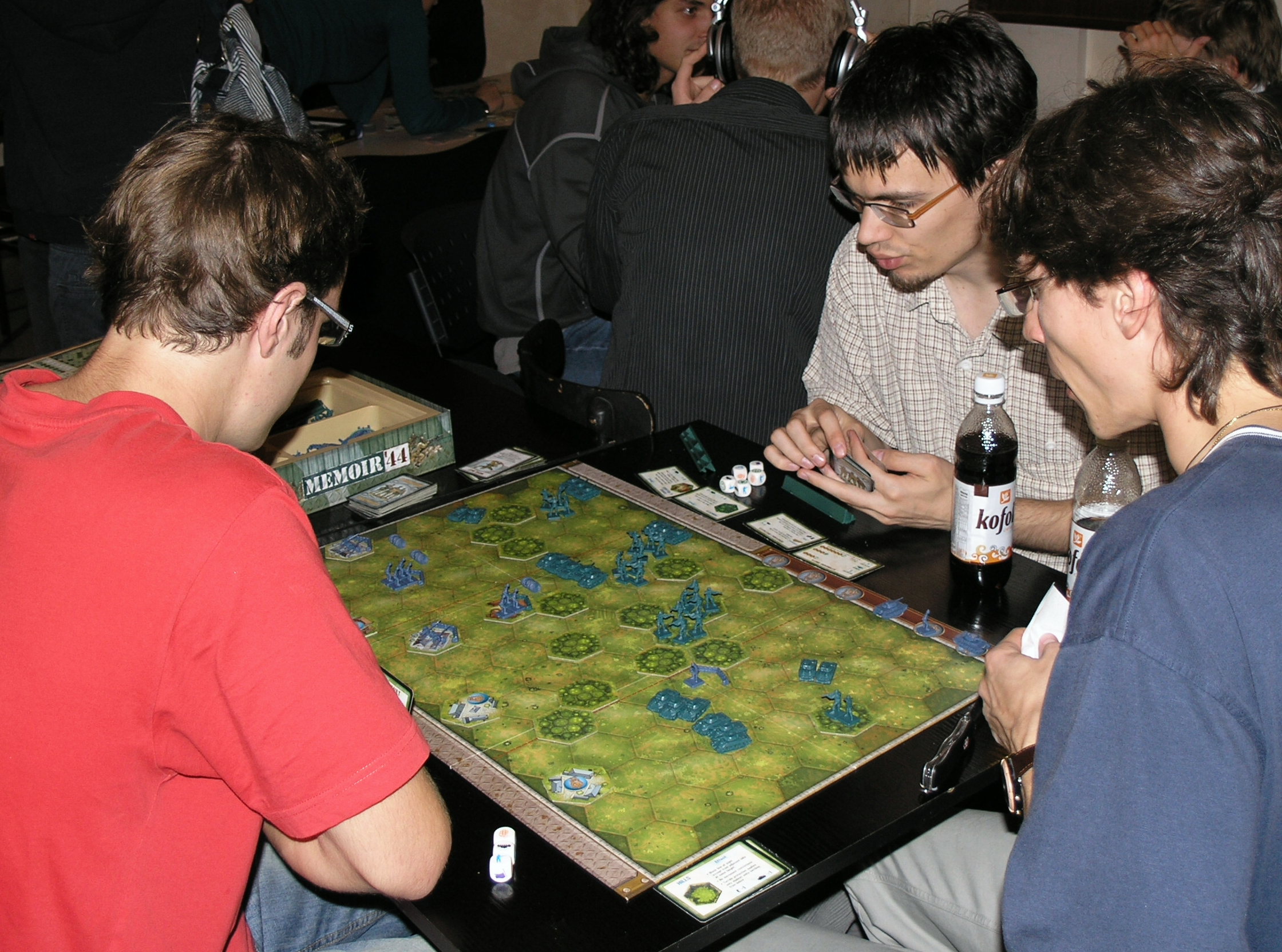
Memoir '44

Players start the game by choosing a scenario, representing a battle from World War II. Scenarios are available from the manual, the internet, or can be invented by players. The terrain and starting positions are laid out according to the scenario.

The battlefield, a 9x13 hexagon-gridded board, is divided into three sections by two red dotted lines, giving each player a left flank (9x4), a center (9x5) and a right flank section (9x4).

Troops are commanded by playing a command card, which orders troops to move, battle and/or execute a special command. There are two types of command cards: Section cards and Tactic cards. Section cards are used to order units in a specific section(s). These cards indicate in which sections of the battlefield units may be given orders, and how many units may be commanded. Tactic cards allow players to make special moves, battle in a specific way or take special actions, as explained on the card.

The object of the game is to be the first to win a set number of Victory Medals, usually 4 to 6, depending on the selected battle scenario's victory conditions. A Victory Medal is gained for each enemy unit eliminated from the battlefield. In some scenarios, additional Medals may be gained from the board map itself, for capturing and holding certain terrain hexagons (hexes) or battlefield objectives.

== Scenarios ==
There are a dozen scenarios in the base game as well as several more in the various expansions and hundreds of fan-made ones. Most of these scenarios are created from famous battles in World War II. Official scenarios (the ones published in expansions, scenario booklets and on the Days of Wonder internet site) have full support from the DoW team and are thoroughly playtested to ensure balance between the two players (e.g. not a total overrun of German troops at the start of the Soviet campaign) and others represent tougher battles like the assault on Omaha Beach, where the Allied player has difficulty in crossing the beach inland.

Another section online is devoted to scenarios the Memoir '44 owners themselves created. These are unofficial and so not playtested by the DoW team, but mostly by the creators themselves. (In rare cases these scenarios are later adopted officially.) These scenarios allow the Memoir '44 player to have experiences designed by other players.

There is a scenario editor where fans can make their own scenarios.

== Units ==
Standard units are infantry, armour, and artillery. Planes are available in the Air Pack and New Flight Plan, and vehicles in the Battle Maps and Equipment Pack.

=== Infantry ===
Normally four figures. Move 0-1 and battle, move 2 and no battle. Battles at 3, 2, 1.

=== Armour ===
Normally three figures. Move 0-3 and battle. Battles at 3, 3, 3.

=== Artillery ===
Normally two figures. Move 0-1 or battle. Battles at 3, 3, 2, 2, 1, 1.

== Command cards ==
Command Cards are used to order soldiers around the board. Command Cards are divided in two types: Section and Tactic cards. There are a total of 60 Command Cards which is divided into 40 section cards and 20 tactic cards. A Command Card is played first to start each turn, followed by ordering units. After all orders are completed, a player replenishes their hand by drawing a new Command Card from the deck. Every turn, a maximum of one card can be played, except for the Ambush Tactic Card, which is played against an action by the other player during their turn. However, some expansions allow for playing more cards.

=== Section cards ===
Section cards, with a green background, are cards that specify the number of units ordered in a specific section or sections. These numbers run from 1-3 and All (meaning that all the units in a particular section can be ordered). Examples include "Probe Left Flank" (allowing a player to order 2 units on the left flank) and "Assault Right Flank" (allowing a player to order all units on the right flank).

A special section card is Recon-1 (with particular section: left, center or right). A player may only order 1 unit in the section stated on the card but at the end of the turn the usual drawing of one Command card is replaced by a choice of one from two Command cards.

=== Tactic cards ===
Tactic Cards are different from section cards in that they do not specify exactly a number of orders in a certain section. These tactic cards consist of special actions or enhancements to battling (such as adding an extra die). They can be distinguished by their grey background.

Examples include "Armor Assault" (order four tank units, units in Close Assault, next to the enemy unit, may battle with an extra die) and "Medics and Mechanics" (order one unit, roll dice to 'heal/repair' the unit by adding figures according to number of dice, and let it move and battle).

== Punchboard components ==
=== Terrain hexagons ===
Terrain hexagons (hexes) show terrain which is placed over the board to make the battle unique. They are usually double-sided.

=== Obstacles ===
Obstacles are rectangular tokens which go over the board and/or hexes. They can provide bonuses or maluses to the unit which occupies that hex.

=== Badges ===
Badges are placed with units and identify that that unit has special capabilities such as increased range or movement. Miniatures from the Equipment Pack can be used to replace some of these badges.

=== Round tokens ===
Round tokens include medals, which identify objectives on the board and battle stars, which mark special abilities such as sabotage and elite units.

== Expansions ==
Days of Wonder has released several expansions to the game. All these expansions require at least one copy of the original game to be played. The expansions are listed in chronological date of release.

=== Army Packs ===
Army packs are either nation packs for Russia, Japan, and the United Kingdom (with miniatures, hexes, tokens, and scenarios specifically for that nation) or the Equipment pack which has supplementary miniatures come with more miniatures.

==== Eastern Front ====
This army pack features the Soviet Union. The Red Army consists of 42 Infantry figures, 24 T-34 tanks and 6 ZIS-3 Artillery gun. It also contains 44 terrain, mainly winter terrain, 14 badges, 10 round markers, 4 obstacles, a Commissar Chip, and 8 new scenarios.

==== Pacific Theatre ====
This army pack features the Japanese army and has 48 infantry figures, 12 Type 95 Ha-Go light tanks, and 6 Type 88 75 mm AA Guns. It also features 44 new terrain tiles (including jungles and rice paddies), 10 round markers, 4 obstacles (including War Ships), 14 Special Unit badges, and 8 Historical Scenarios. Also included are War Ships (destroyer, Aircraft carrier) and the night visibility chart, which influences fighting and range.

==== Mediterranean Theatre ====
This army pack introduces the British army, consisting of 42 infantry, 24 Crusader tanks, 6 25 pounder gun-howitzers, and 3 anti-tank SWAs (Special Weapon Assets). It also includes new terrain, obstacles, badges, rules, and 8 new scenarios.

==== Equipment Pack ====
This army pack has hundreds of supplemental miniatures to upgrade the aesthetic quality of one's game. It includes minor WWII nations (48 French Infantry, 24 Finnish Ski Troops, 12 Italian Artillery and 24 Polish Cavalry figures), 4 Artillery types (6 “Flak-88” Heavy Anti-Tank Guns, 6 “Long Tom” Big Guns, 6 “M7 Priest” Mobile Artillery and 6 “Nebelwerfer” Screaming Meemies figures), Beach Landing Equipment (6 “LCT-202” Landing Crafts and 6 Hobart’s Funnies figures, complete with their accessories), 3 Armor types (6 “Elefant Panzerjäger” Tank Destroyers, 3 “Sd.Kfz 250” and 3 “Tiger” Tanks figures), 3 Vehicle types (6 “Kübelwagen” Command Cars, 3 “Jeep Willys” Long-Range Patrol Cars and 3 “Dodge WC-63” Supply Trucks figures), 2 Special Weapon Assets (6 “Browning M2” Machine Guns and 6 “M2 60mm” Mortars figures), 6 Sniper figures. It has a scenario booklet detailing 11 Standard, 4 Overlord and 2 Breakthrough battles, a rulebook, and 25 Summary Cards.

=== Expansions ===
==== Terrain Pack ====
This expansion pack consists mostly of new terrain, landmarks, and badges. Its main purpose is to allow for a much greater variety in scenario creation. Using its components, players can design a wide variety of new scenarios and also play many other user-developed scenarios from the Memoir 44 website. Examples of tiles include landmarks like a radar station (with optional special rules), roads (which enhance movement), railroads and a train, new bridges and badges (Airborne, engineers).

==== Air Pack ====
This expansion pack, released on December 18, 2007, introduces airplanes into the scenarios. It includes a set of 8 painted miniature planes, air rules for scenarios, updated command cards, and updated scenarios.

The 8 pre-painted aircraft are, for each power respectively:

United States:

- Lockheed P-38 Lightning
- Curtiss P-40 Warhawk
- Vought F4U Corsair

United Kingdom

- Supermarine Spitfire

Soviet Union:

- Yakovlev Yak-1 (also used for the 7 and 9 series)

Germany:

- Messerschmitt Bf 109
- Fieseler Fi 156 Storch

Japan:

- Mitsubishi A6M Zero

As of December 17, 2013 the Air Pack has been discontinued and is now only available as a PDF download on Days of Wonder's website. It has been reimplemented by New Flight Plan.

==== New Flight Plan ====
An air expansion that streamlines and simplifies the rules of the original Air Pack with brand new rules for air to ground and air to air warfare. Alongside new rules, the expansion also included 16 unpainted airplane miniatures, 30 air combat cards, 8 reference cards for the airplanes, 15 nation markers for the airplanes, 18 machine gun markers, 12 bomb markers, 1 rules booklet and 1 booklet with 21 new scenarios. The expansion was released at the end of May 2019.

=== Boards and maps ===
==== Winter / Desert Board ====
This is a new board for use with the expansions. One side features a desert map for use with the Terrain Pack and Mediterranean Theatre expansion and the other side features a winter map for use with the Eastern Front expansion or snowy scenarios on the Western Front. Simplified Campaign Rules and Blitz Rules are also added.

==== Breakthrough Kit ====
The breakthrough kit has two double-sided, 9-panel board maps covering all four Memoir ’44 map environments – countryside, beach, winter and deserts These oversize boards stretch the limit of current printing technology and are 13 x 17 hexes deep, opening up the Breakthrough format to new, more expansive scenarios. It comes with new scenarios for these maps as well.

==== Battle Map Series ====
Days of Wonder also started to create battle maps themselves. These battle maps are large battles played in Overlord style (or even bigger, as is the case with Tigers in the Snow). Another feature of the battle maps is that it includes extra materials, like miniatures or new cards. They are pre-printed on paper. Battlemaps have included "Hedgerow Hell", "Tigers in the Snow", "Sword of Stalingrad", "Disaster at Dieppe", "Battles of Khalkin Gol", and "Through Jungle and Desert".

==== D-Day Landings ====
The D-Day landings are the biggest maps ever released for the game. It has six pre-printed Battle Maps, each 13×23 hexes: American Airborne, Utah Beach, Omaha Beach, Gold Beach, Juno Beach and Sword Beach, new rules and troops, and several game modes: Double-Map (OverThrough), Triple-Map and Ultimate Six-Map battles. All six maps can be combined for the ultimate D-Day experience.

== Campaign Bag ==
An olive drab game bag with several pockets. On the outside are Memoir 44 logos and other artwork. It is large enough to store two copies of the original game and all the current expansions. Comes with an additional two-sided paper breakthrough map. On one side of the new breakthrough map is regular terrain. On the other side is a brand new breakthrough scenario titled Breakthrough to Gembloux.

== Books ==
There are three books published by Days of Wonder for Memoir '44 - the two Campaign Books, which have new scenarios and campaign rules for playing multiple scenarios one after another have been published, and the Tactics and Strategy guide.

=== Campaign Book Volume 1 ===
Campaign Book Volume 1 was published in 2009 and contains fifty scenarios and campaign rules in which players can play many of these scenarios together in larger campaigns, some scenarios found in the Campaign Book Volume 1 require the Terrain Pack & Eastern Front. As of December 17, 2013 this volume has been Out Of Print and is now only available as a PDF download.

=== Campaign Book Volume 2 ===
Campaign Book Volume 2 was published in 2011, expanding on the campaign rules found in Campaign Book Volume 1, Campaign Book Volume 2 contains 46 scenarios which are covered in 11 different campaigns. Some scenarios found in the Campaign Book Volume 2 require the Terrain Pack & Pacific & Air Pack.

=== Tactics and Strategy guide ===
Written by Alexis "Praxeo" Beuve, the Tactics and Strategy guide is aimed to improve a player's play. It tells you how to read the battle map, effectively maneuver troops, anticipate opponents’ moves and gauge their relative strengths and weaknesses; as well as discover how to manage the medal count and control the flow of the game. It has a careful study of 139 scenarios and 4 annotated games.

== Reviews ==
- Backstab #49 (as "Mémoire 44")
- Family Games: The 100 Best
- Rebel Times #13

== Awards and honors ==
Memoir'44

- 2004 Charles S. Roberts Best World War II Boardgame Nominee
- 2004 International Gamers Awards - General Strategy; Two-players
- 2004 France - Nominee Tric Trac
- 2005 Årets Spill Best Strategy Game Winner
- 2005 Games Magazine Best New Historical Simulation Game Winner
- 2005 Wargamer.com Award of Excellence
- 2005 Boardgameratings.com Best 2 player Game
