= Mark Simonitch =

American wargame designer and artist

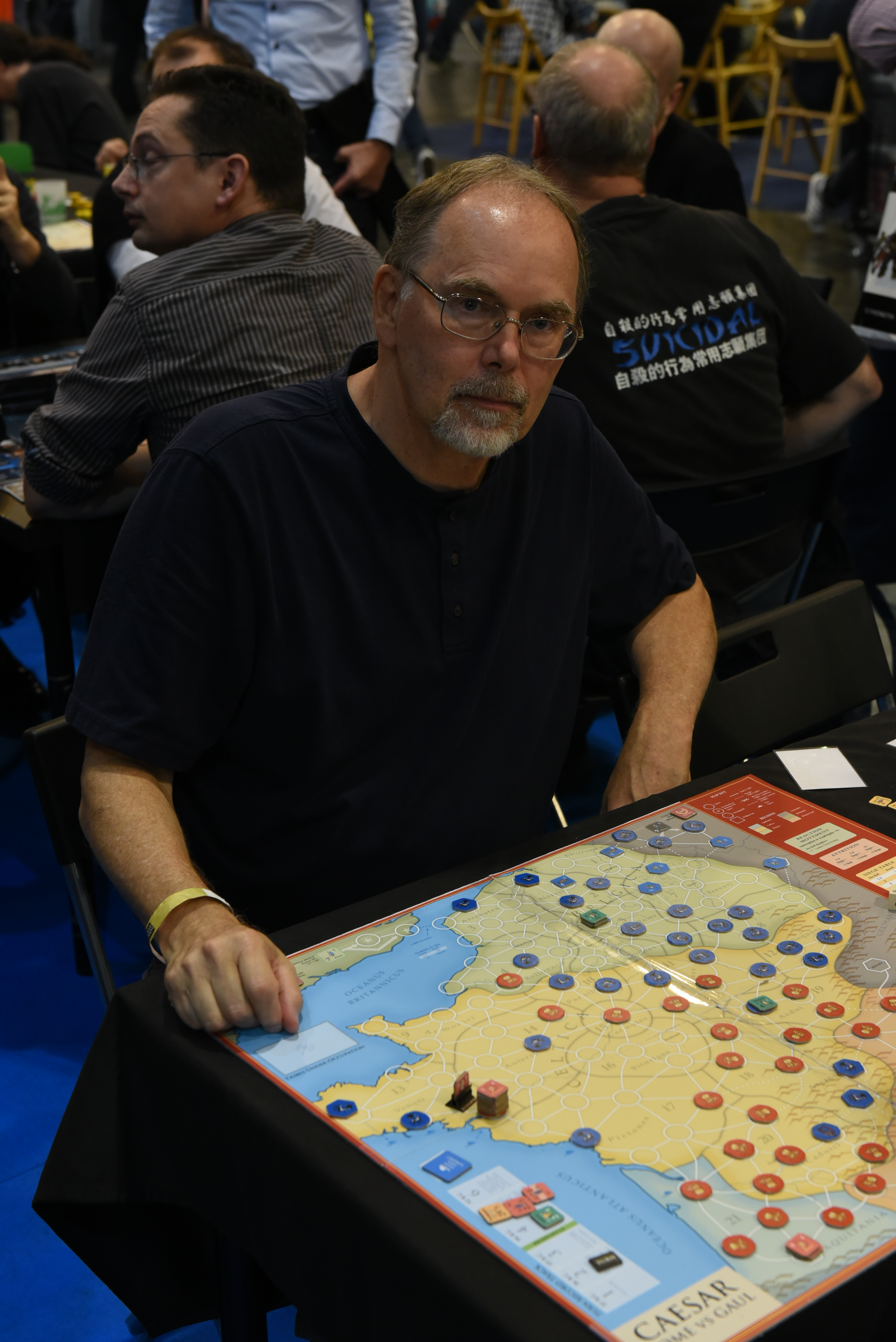
- Mark Simonitch 2017 in Essen, Germany.
- Born: December 30, 1957 (age 68)

Mark Simonitch (born December 30, 1957) is an American wargame designer and graphic artist. His game designs include Hannibal: Rome vs. Carthage and Ardennes '44, and he has made maps for Wilderness War and Empire of the Sun among others. He has worked at Avalon Hill and GMT Games. He was inducted into the Charles Roberts Awards Hall of Fame in 2002.

== Biography ==
Simonitch was raised in Ross, California. He studied at California Polytechnic State University. He began wargaming in 1966, his first gaming experiences included Jutland and Gettysburg by Avalon Hill. From 1991 to 1994 he was a freelance artist and created maps and counters for over 100 wargames with clients including Strategy & Tactics, Command Magazine, GMT Games, 3W, and Avalanche Games. During this period he also started Rhino Game Company (or Rhino Studios) and published three games. He moved to Baltimore, Maryland in spring 1995 where he was employed by Avalon Hill until 1997. He has worked at GMT Games from 1997 to the present as a Graphic Designer.

== Awards ==
The below are all Charles S. Roberts Award wins, the list does not include nominations. Of his 14 awards, 5 were won by him alone, the rest shared awards where he designed the map.

- 1990 Best Wargame Graphics, Kadesh, map (XTR Corporation)
- 1991 James F. Dunnigan Award for Playability & Design Winner, The Legend Begins (Rhino Games)
- 1992 Best Wargame Graphics, SPQR, map (GMT Games)
- 1993 Best Wargame Graphics, Lion of the North, map (GMT Games)
- 1994 Best Wargame Graphics, Battles of Waterloo, map (GMT Games)
- 2000 James F. Dunnigan Award for Playability & Design Winner, Ukraine '43 (GMT Games)
- 2000 Best World War Two Game, Ukraine '43 (GMT Games)
- 2001 Best Wargame Graphics, Wilderness War, map (GMT Games)
- 2002 Charles Roberts Awards Hall of Fame
- 2003 Best Wargame Graphics, Ardennes '44, map (GMT Games)
- 2005 Best Wargame Graphics, Empire of the Sun, map (GMT Games)
- 2007 Best Wargame Graphics, 1914: Twilight in the East, map (GMT Games)
- 2010 Best Wargame Graphics, Normandy '44, map (GMT Games)
- 2010 Best World War Two Game, Normandy '44 (GMT Games)

Other awards include:

- 2004 The Wargamer magazine Award for Excellence, Ardennes '44 (GMT Games)
- 2008 Golden Geek Best Wargame Winner, Hannibal: Rome vs Carthage, game (Valley Games)
- 2008 Golden Geek Best 2-Player Board Game Winner, Hannibal: Rome vs Carthage, game (Valley Games)
- 2018 Golden Geek Best Wargame Winner, Hannibal & Hamilcar, game (PHALANX) with Jaro Andruszkiewicz

== Game designer ==
- 1991 The Legend Begins (Rhino Studios)
- 1992 Campaign to Stalingrad (Rhino Studios)
- 1994 Decision in France (Rhino Studios)
- 1996 Hannibal: Rome vs. Carthage (Avalon Hill)
- 1997 Successors (second edition) (Avalon Hill). With Richard H. Berg
- 2000 Ukraine '43 (GMT Games). With Tony Curtis
- 2003 Ardennes '44 (GMT Games)
- 2008 Hannibal: Rome vs. Carthage (Valley Games)
- 2009 The Caucasus Campaign (GMT Games). With Joe Youst
- 2010 Normandy '44 (GMT Games)
- 2013 France '40 (GMT Games)
- 2015 The U.S. Civil War (GMT Games)
- 2017 Holland '44: Operation Market-Garden (GMT Games)
- 2018 Hannibal & Hamilcar (PHALANX, Asyncron Games, Mas Que Oca, Feuerland, Cranio). With Jaro Andruszkiewicz
- 2019 Stalingrad '42 (GMT Games)
- 2022 Salerno '43 (GMT Games)
- 2023 North Africa '41 (GMT Games)
- 2024 France '40 (second edition) (GMT Games)
- 2025 Italy '43 (GMT Games)

== Notable graphic art ==
Simonitch has designed maps, counters, box art, cards and other elements for hundreds of games, below are some of the most notable titles.

- 1998 Bitter Woods (Avalon Hill)
- 1998 For the People (Avalon Hill)
- 1999 Paths of Glory (GMT Games)
- 2000 Battle Line (GMT Games)
- 2001 Wilderness War (GMT Games)
- 2005 Empire of the Sun (GMT Games)
- 2005 Twilight Struggle (GMT Games)
- 2006 Combat Commander: Europe (GMT Games)
- 2006 Here I Stand (GMT Games)
- 2010 Washington's War (GMT Games)
- 2010 Commands & Colors: Napoleonics (GMT Games)
- 2010 Labyrinth: The War on Terror, 2001-? (GMT Games)
- 2011 No Retreat! The Russian Front (GMT Games)
- 2012 1989: Dawn of Freedom (GMT Games)
- 2012 Next War: Korea (GMT Games)
- 2015 Churchill (GMT Games)
