= GMT Games =

American board game publisher

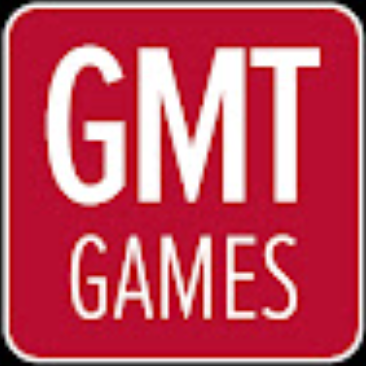
- GMT Games logo
- Industry: Gaming
- Founded: 1990
- Key people: Tony Curtis, Rodger MacGowan, Mark Simonitch, and Andy Lewis
- Website: www.gmtgames.com

GMT Games is a California-based wargaming publisher founded in 1990. The company has become well known for graphically attractive games that range from "monster games" of many maps and counters, to quite simple games suitable for introducing new players to wargaming. They also produce card games and family games. The current management and creative team includes Tony Curtis, Mark Simonitch, and Andy Lewis.

== History ==
GMT's name comes from the first name initials of founders Gene Billingsley, Mike Crane, and Terry Shrum. Crane and Shrum later left GMT and founded the Fresno Gaming Association.

In the 1990s GMT pioneered a pre-order system called "Project 500" or "P500", where customers pre-order a title and production does not begin until a set minimum of orders had been reached. This system has been adopted by other wargame publishers. GMT was successful during the 1990s, when other war game publishers were failing, which has been credited in part to their innovative P500 system.

GMT is known for publishing the COIN series of games, which started with Andean Abyss: Insurgency and Counterinsurgency in Colombia by Volko Ruhnke, a CIA instructor. Most COIN titles feature four playable factions commanding guerrilla forces or conventional military forces, both trying to win the hearts and minds of the local population. The games focus on historical conflicts such as the Cuban Revolution, Vietnam War, Gallic Wars, American Revolution, War in Afghanistan, and others.

GMT's best-known game may be Twilight Struggle, a card-driven strategy game about the global Cold War. In 2018, GMT began creating Windows and mobile adaptations for some of their titles, including Twilight Struggle and Labyrinth: The War on Terror.

GMT was about to publish Scramble for Africa in 2019, but pulled the title after controversy erupted about its subject matter.

The Washington Post called GMT "the modern hobby's highest-profile wargame publisher" and characterized P500 as a "Kickstarter before Kickstarter that allowed fans to vote with their wallets on which GMT games should come to market". Wargamer Magazine called them a "house-name in table-top wargaming". VICE News said they are "one of the biggest and most successful [companies], with one of the largest libraries."

== Published games ==
Some of the better-known games produced by GMT Games include:

- 18XX series - strategy economic board games about railway construction and investing in railroad companies.
- At Any Cost: Metz 1870
- Battle Line
- Chandragupta
- COIN series - a card-driven action board game series based on counterinsurgency and irregular warfare.
- Combat Commander series - a card-drive game, simulating tactical warfare usually in World War 2.
- Commands & Colors: Ancients - a block game with card-driven action, based upon tactical combat in the Classical Period.
- A Distant Plain: Insurgency in Afghanistan
- Dominant Species
- Down in Flames, a series of air combat cards games that includes The Rise of the Luftwaffe and Eighth Air Force
- Europe Engulfed
- Fields of Fire
- Here I Stand
- Labyrinth: The War on Terror, 2001 – ?
- Lost Victory
- MBT series - wargame series that is modeling the hypothetical clash set in 1987 between US and Soviet forces in Germany. Later expansion added British, West German, and Canadian forces.
- Next War series - wargame series that is based on hypothetical war on modern times.
- No Retreat: The Russian Front - a two-player, hex-based game set on the Eastern Front of World War II. Won the "Best World War Two Game" category at the 2011 Charles S. Roberts Awards.
- Operation Mercury
- Panzer series - a detailed, tactical-level, World War II game based in the European theater, currently with 4 expansion sets.
- Paths of Glory
- Rome: Imperium, Circus Maximus, Hannibal vs Rome (2001)
- Space Empires 4X
- Sword of Rome
- SPQR
- Twilight Struggle - card-driven board game, based on the Cold War.
- Wilderness War: The French & Indian War
- Wing Leader series - aerial combat wargames series with side-scrolling views, mainly based on World War II era aircraft.
- ZERO! The Rise and Fall of the Imperial Japanese Air Force
