= La Bataille d'Espagnol: Talavera =

1979 board game

Box cover of 1st edition by Marshall Enterprises

La Bataille d'Espagnol: Talavera, also published as La Bataille de Talavera, is a board wargame published by Marshall Enterprises in 1979 that is a simulation of the 1809 Battle of Talavera.

== Background ==
During the Peninsular War in July 1809, an Anglo-Spanish army under the command of Sir Arthur Wellesley encountered a French army near the town of Talavera. Although the French withdrew back to Madrid following the battle, the British had taken heavy casualties while their Spanish allies had stayed on their line. Wellesley withdrew the British forces to Portugal for over a year, and the battle is now considered a strategic French victory.

== Description ==
La Bataille d'Espagnol: Talavera is a two-player wargame that uses a set of rules common to the "La Bataille" series produced by Marshall Enterprises.

=== Components ===
The ziplock bag or game box contains:

- four 17" x 22" paper hex grid maps, scaled at 100 m (110 yd) per hex
- 700 die-cut counters
- 16-page rule book
- player aids

=== Gameplay ===
The game provides five scenarios:

1. Ruffin's Night Attack
2. Ruffin's morning Attack
3. Jourdan's Attack
4. The Afternoon Battle
5. The Overall Battle: Scenarios 1, 2 & 4 in sequence

== Publication history ==
In the 1970s, Marshall Enterprises (originally Martial Enterprises) published a number of Napoleonic wargames with identical rules under the "La Bataille" banner, including La Bataille de la Moscowa (1975), La Bataille d'Auerstædt (1977), and La Bataille de Pruessisch-Eylau (1978). La Bataille d'Espagnol: Talavera was the fourth in the series, a game designed by Monte Mattson and Dennis A. Spors and published in 1979 as both a ziplock bag game and a boxed set.

In 1984, Clash of Arms bought the rights to the entire "Bataille" series; after Ed Wimble revised the rules, the game was re-released as La Bataille de Talavera in 1986.

== Reception ==
In Issue 33 of Phoenix, Paul King examined the historicty of the game compared to historical records and found that the design seemed to betray a French historical bias. He concluded, "As a simulation of Talavera the Battle, this is a rather average attempt, due perhaps in part to the rather sketchy research on the real battle, which would seem to be entirely from French sources, although it is difficult to be sure."

In The Wargamer, Jim Hind was impressed that the counter colors were based upon the actual uniforms of the regiments. He also found the simulation to be somewhat historically accurate. After playing one of the shorter scenarios, he called the rules "the most detailed account of Napoleonic tactics I have seen", but noted it took him four hours of play to cover just two hours of the actual battle. He questioned whether the longer scenarios were possible to finish. He suggested that there was too much detailed management needed, and that a game this size would be better suited to teams of players. He concluded, "I love your thinking, guys, but how about sparing a thought for us people who like to play our games to a conclusion?".

== Awards ==
At the 1987 Origins Awards, the second edition of La Bataille d'Espagnol: Talavera published by Clash of Arms was a finalist for the Charles S. Roberts Award for "Best Pre-World War II Board Game of 1986."

== Other reviews and commentary ==
- Fire & Movement #57
- Moves #53, p10
