= Royal Academy Exhibition of 1910 =

1910 art exhibition in London

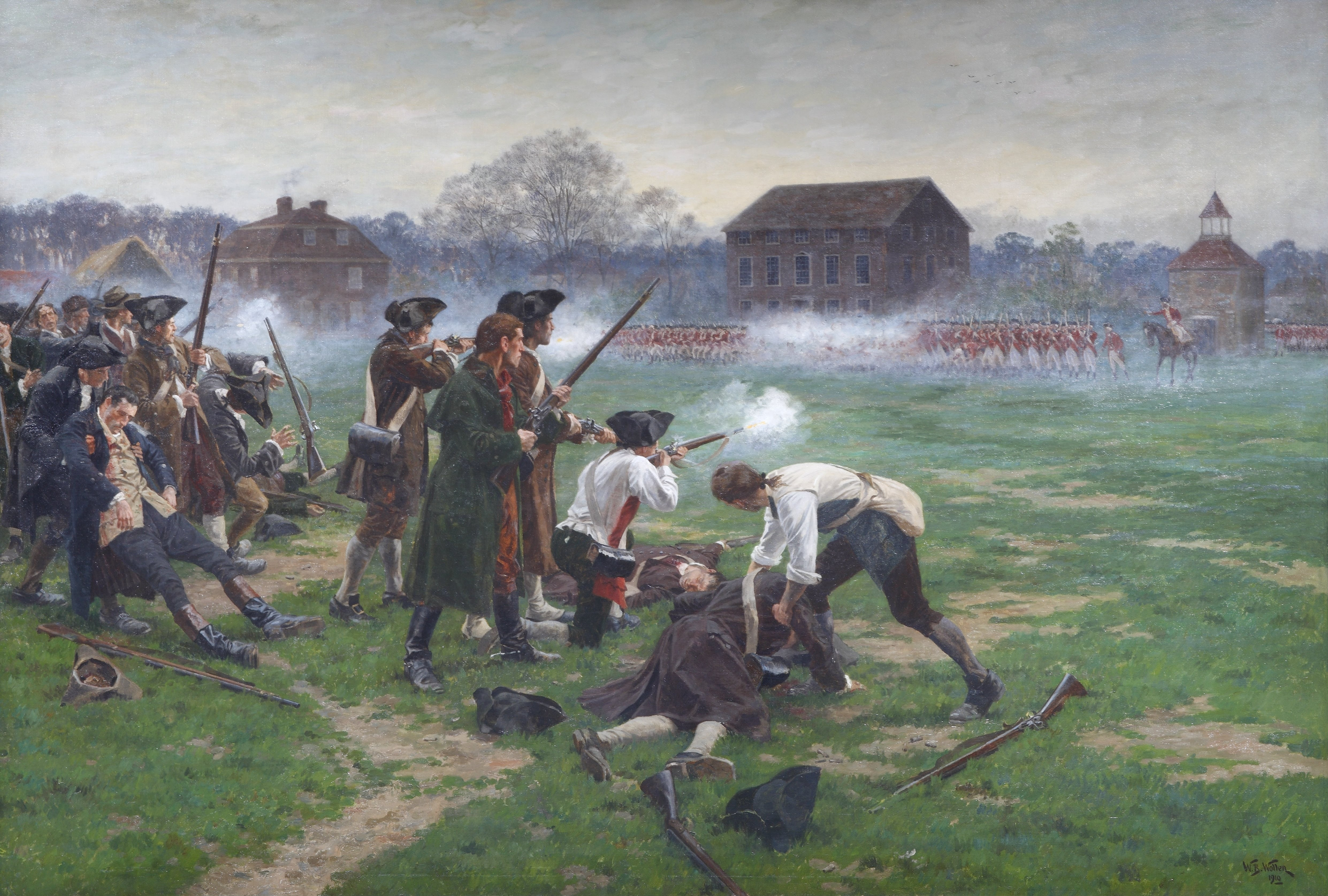
The Battle of Lexington by William Barnes Wollen

The Royal Academy Exhibition of 1910 was an art exhibition held in London. It was the hundred and fifty first Annual Exhibition held by the British Royal Academy of Arts. It took place at the Royal Academy's headquarters at Burlington House in Piccadilly from 5 May to 9 August 1910. It featured many of the leading artists and architects of the Edwardian Era.

Critics often expressed a degree of nostalgia for the late Victorian era when they assessed the paintings exhibited. Amongst the works on display were Edward Stott's The Good Samaritan. In portraiture Hubert von Herkomer displayed four pictures. John Singer Sargent exhibited Vespers, now in the Walker Art Gallery in Liverpool. James Jebusa Shannon submitted Black and Silver, his diploma work on being elected for full membership of the Royal Academy.

Three notable paintings of military history were displayed: The Battle of Lexington by William Barnes Wollen depicted the opening shots of the American War of Independence while James Prinsep Beadle displayed The Rear Guard showing the Retreat to Corunna during the Peninsular War. Edwin Austin Abbey displayed The Camp of the American Army at Valley Forge, which had been commissioned for the Pennsylvania State Capitol in Harrisburg.

Alfred Munnings, associated with the Newlyn School of artists, submitted two works The Watering and The Roving Life. Luke Fildes displayed a portrait of the stage actor George Alexander.

== Gallery ==
Carina by Luke Fildes

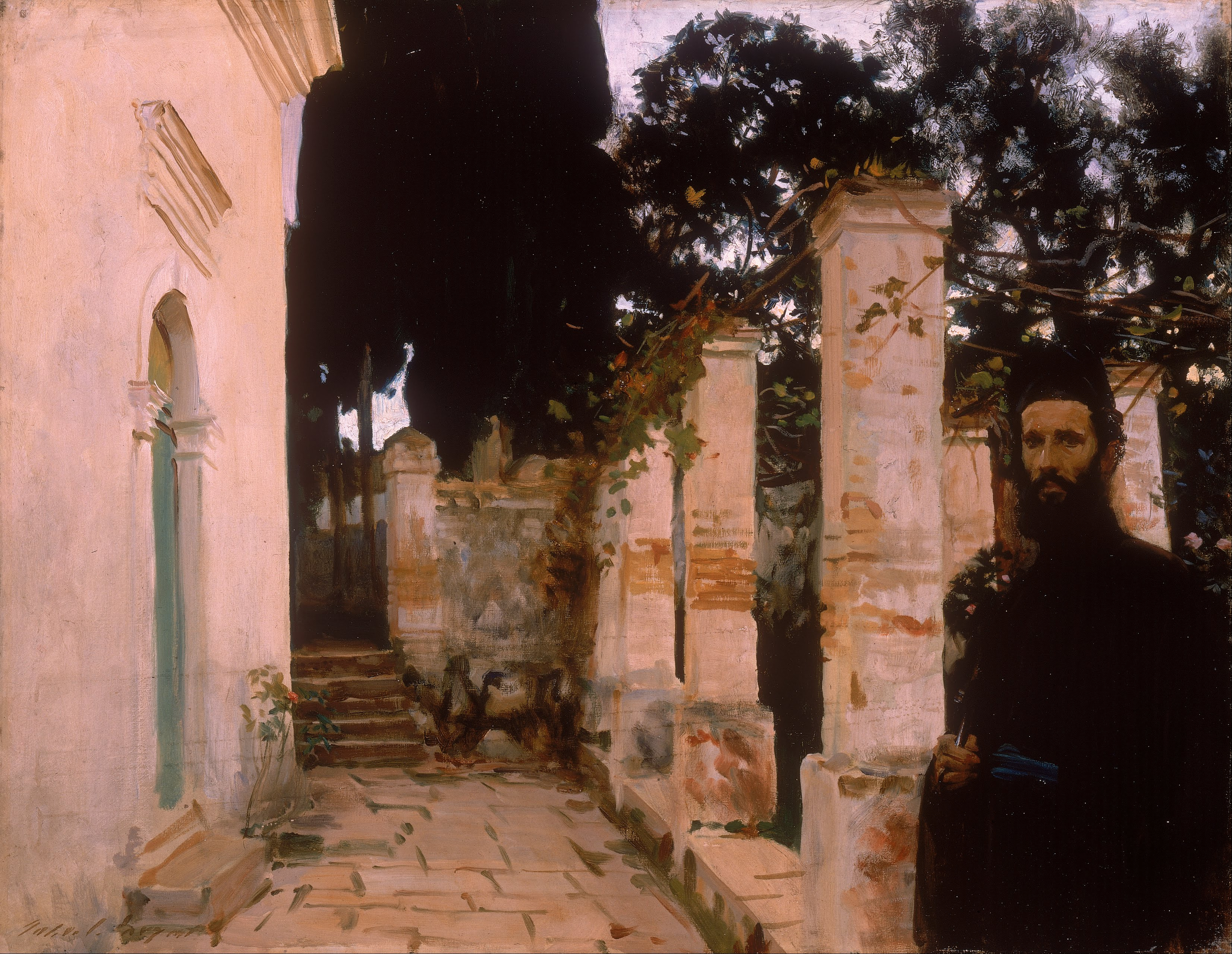
Vespers by John Singer Sargent

Glacier Streams by John Singer Sargent

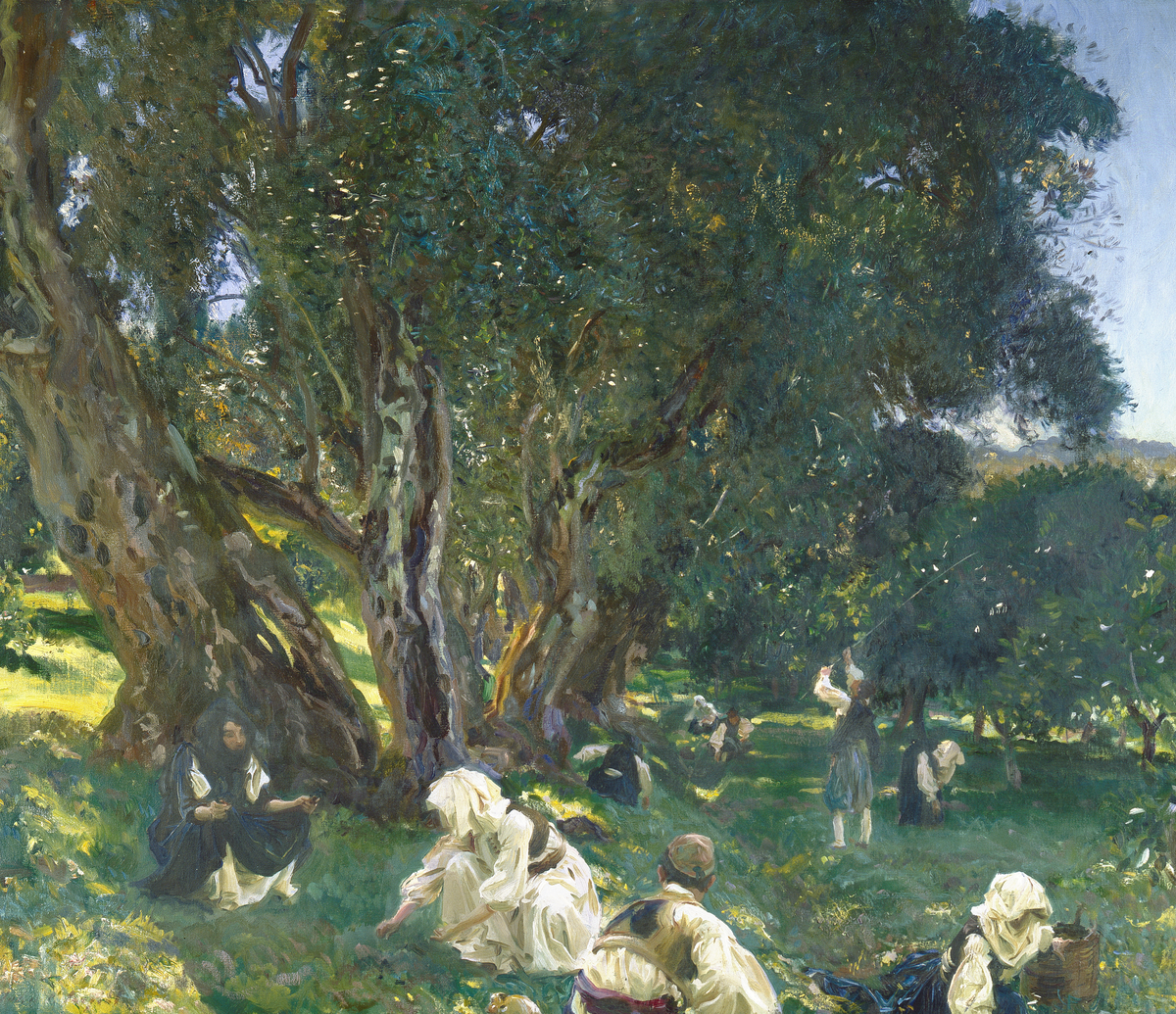
Albanian Olive Gatherers by John Singer Sargent

Black and Silver by James Jebusa Shannon

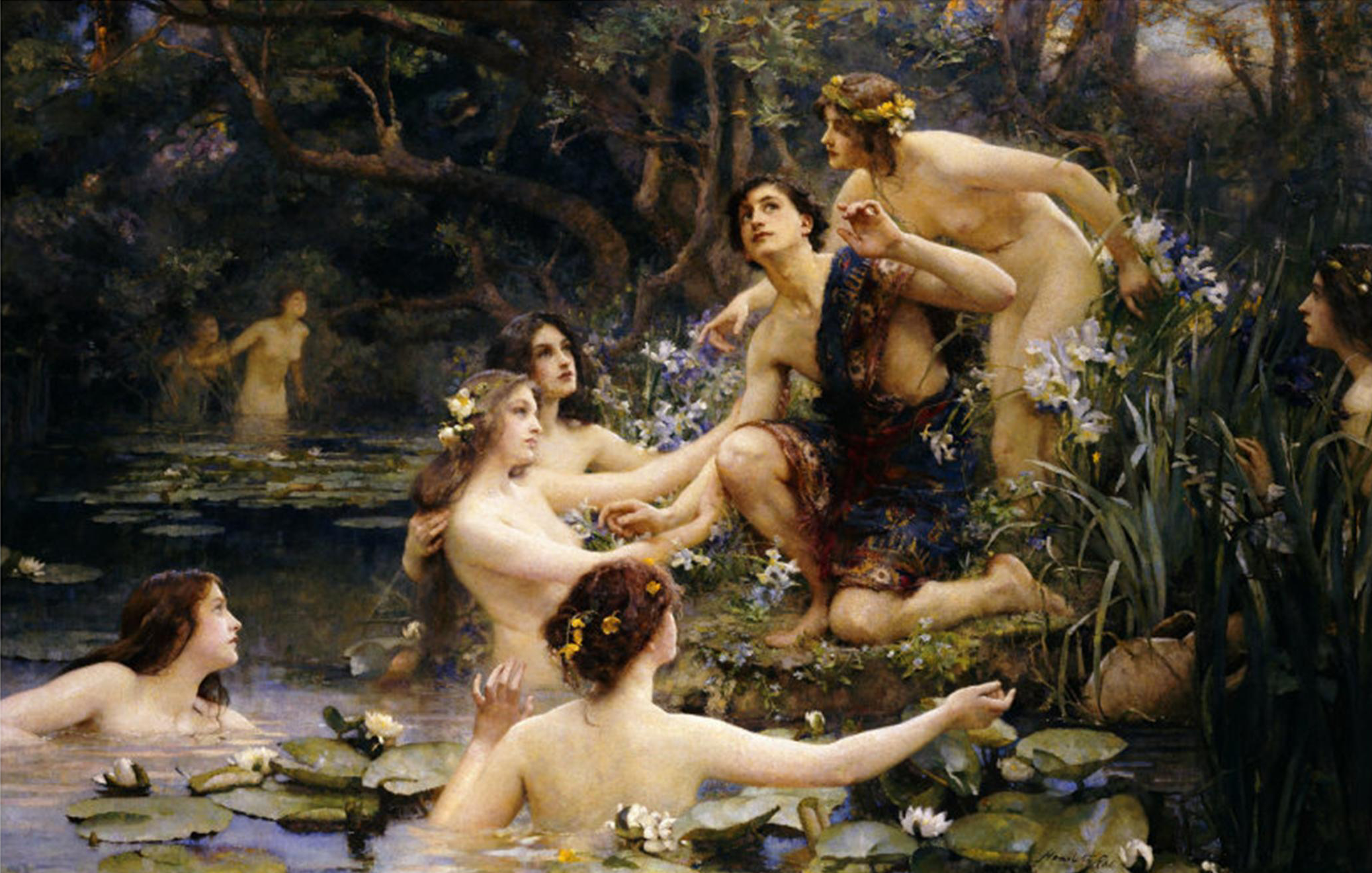
Hylas and the Water Nymphs by Henrietta Rae

The Women by John Charlton

Ophelia by John William Waterhouse

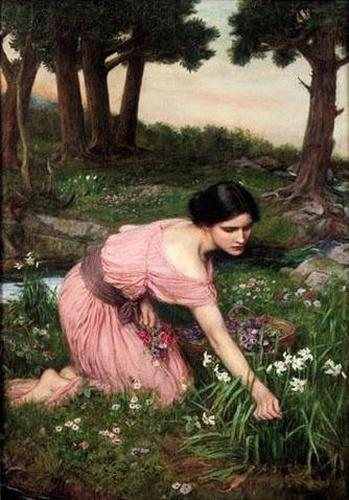
Spring Spreads One Green Lap of Flowers by John William Waterhouse

The Pier Head by Stanhope Forbes

The Vegetable Shop by Stanhope Forbes

Old Cronies by Stanhope Forbes

On the Bure at Wroxham by Alfred Parsons

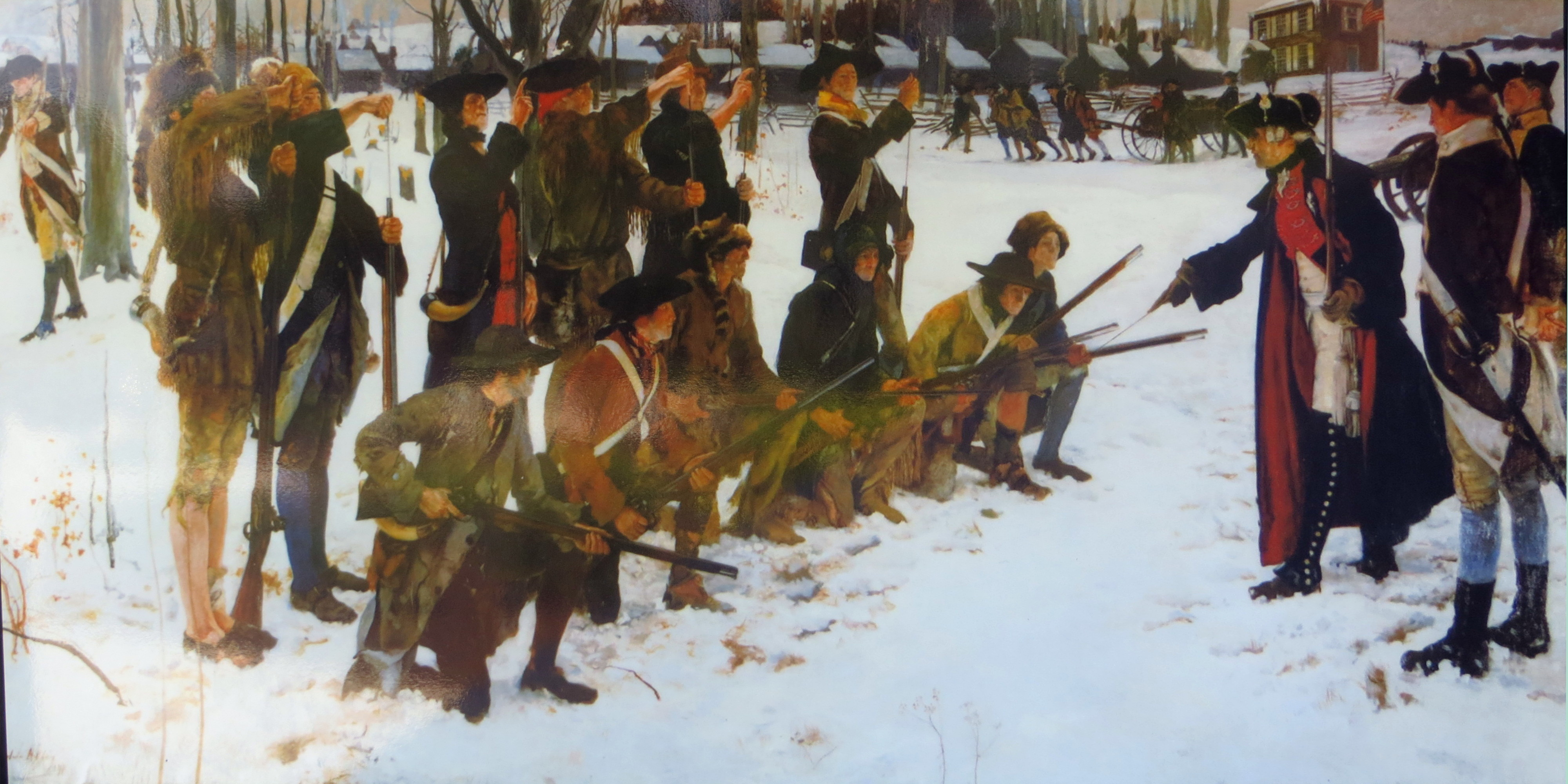
The Camp of the American Army at Valley Forge by Edwin Austin Abbey

Knighting of Sir William Smith Crossman by Edward VII by William Hatherell

Through Sea and Air by Charles Napier Hemy

Plymouth by Charles Napier Hemy

After the Storm by Benjamin Williams Leader

On the Track of a Fugitive by Ernest Crofts

A Great Lady by John Collier

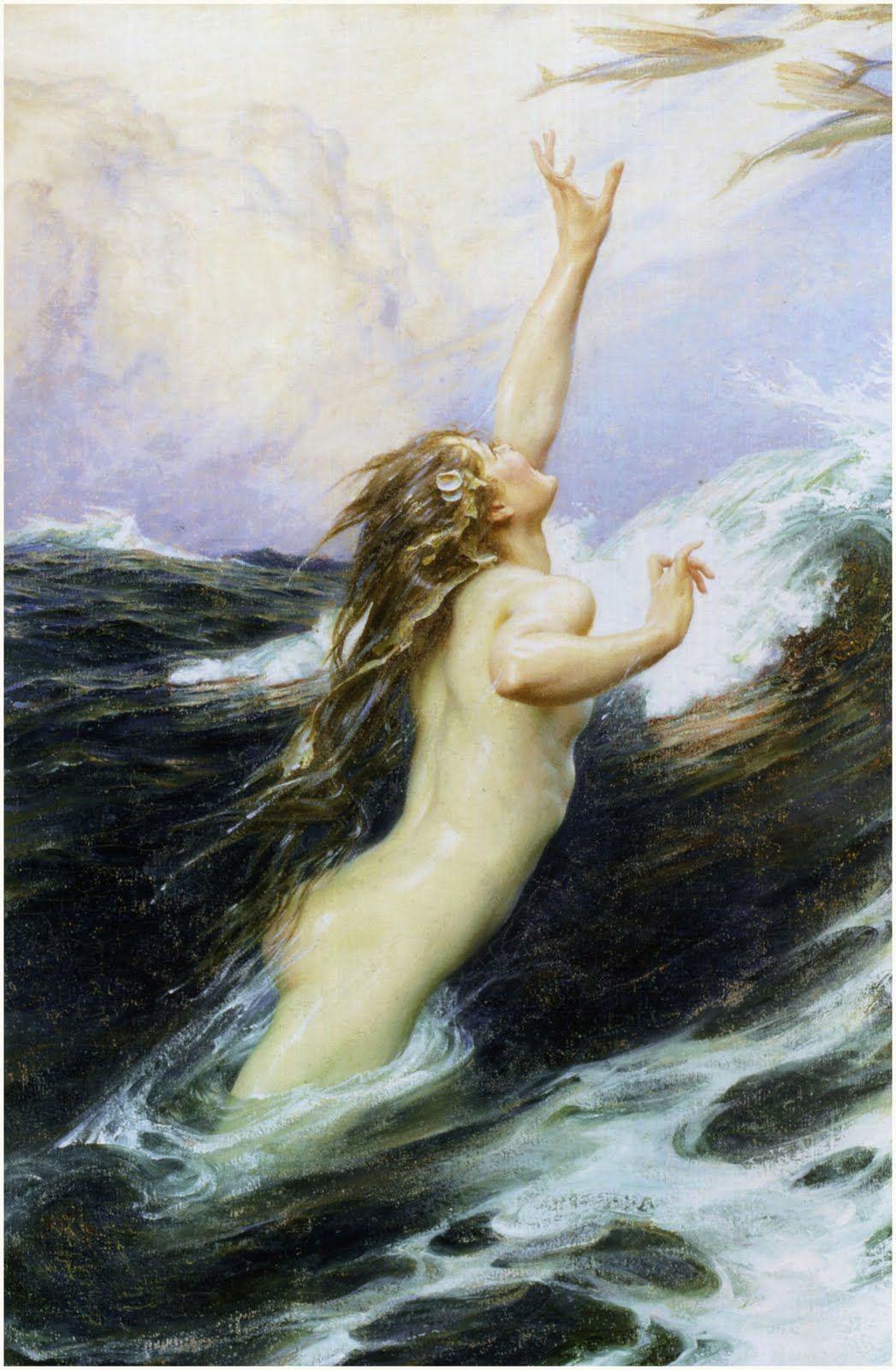
Flying Fish by Herbert James Draper

The Couch Burners by Arthur Hacker

The New Arrival by Walter Langley

The Signal Box by John Arnesby Brown

Silver Morning by John Arnesby Brown

Pelleas and Melisande by Edmund Blair Leighton

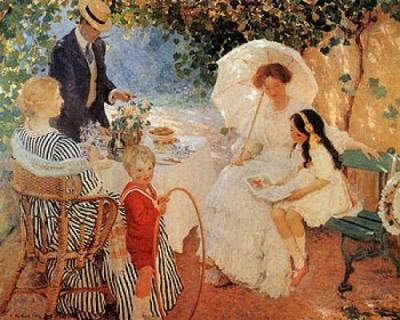
The Arbour by E. Phillips Fox

When the West with Evening Glows by Joseph Farquharson

Evening, The Wild Woods Among by Joseph Farquharson

Clavering Church by George Clausen

Tug of War by Harold Harvey

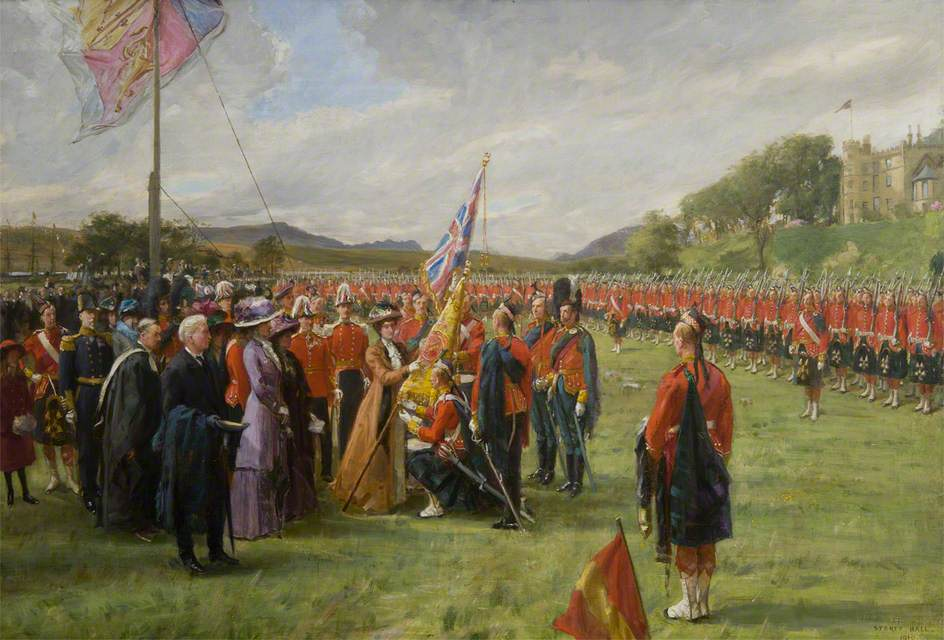
Presentation of the Colours by Sydney Prior Hall

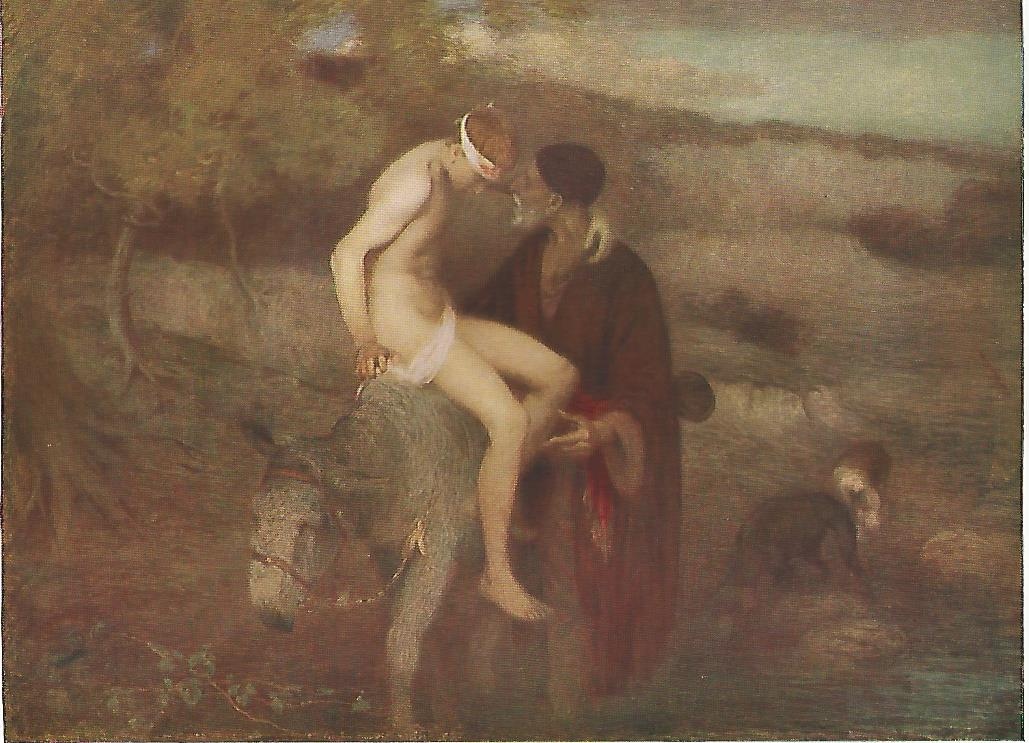
The Good Samaritan by Edward Stott

There Was No Room in the Inn by Edward Stott

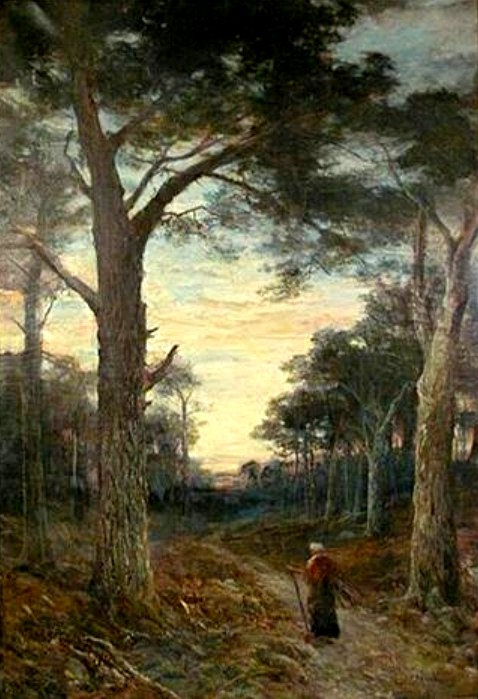
The Gates of the Forest by John MacWhirter

Heather, Scottish Highlands by John MacWhirter

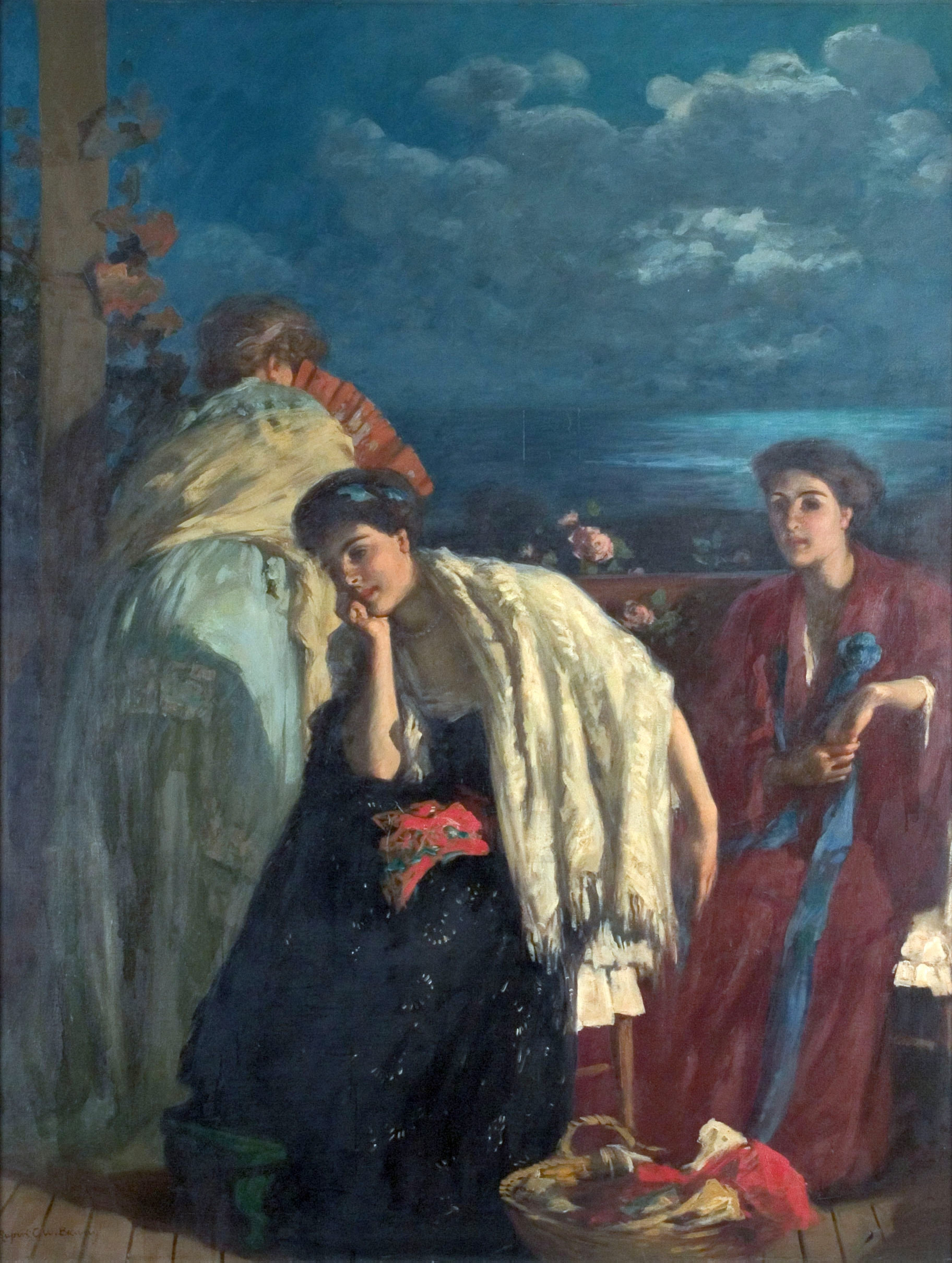
The Sonata by Rupert Bunny

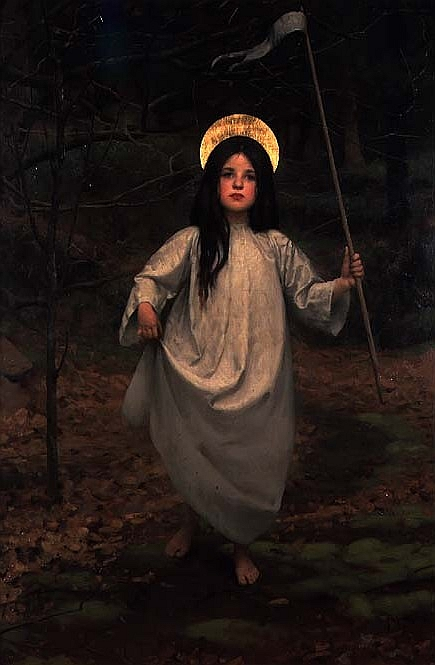
The Flag by Thomas Cooper Gotch

The House-builder by John Henry Lorimer

Love Divine by George Henry Grenville Manton

Evening, Rochester by Alfred Bentley

Where the Wind and the Waves and a Lone Shore Meet by David Murray

Spring Blossoms to the Mountain Snows by David Murray

Lake Como from Menaggio by David Murray

The Cold North by John Macallan Swan

Early Editions by Fred Leist

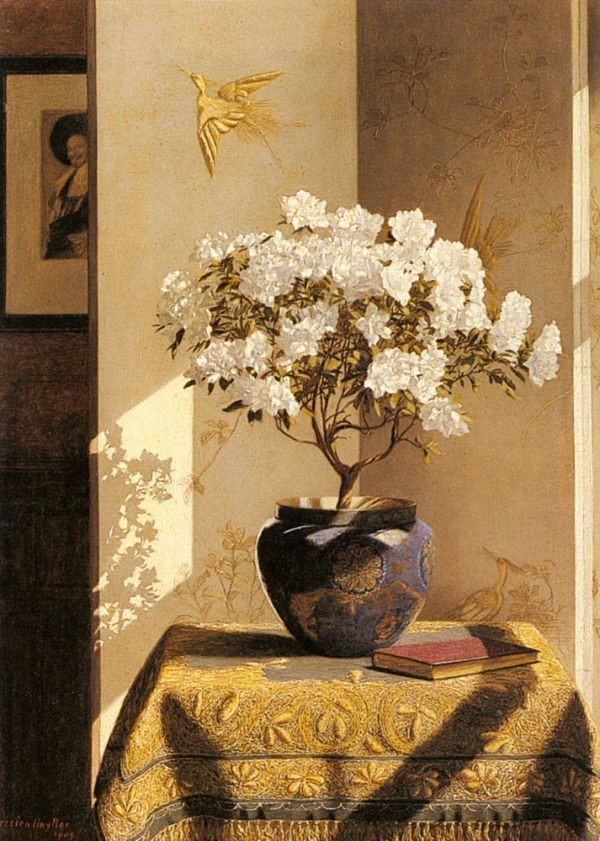
A Sunny Corner by Jessica Hayllar

Cleopatra by Byam Shaw

A Garden in Corfu by John Singer Sargent

The Enchanted Shore by Rowland Wheelright

The Spirit of the Stream by Richard Jack

Portrait of Lady Markham by Edward Poynter

Portrait of Lady Inverclyde by Frank Dicksee

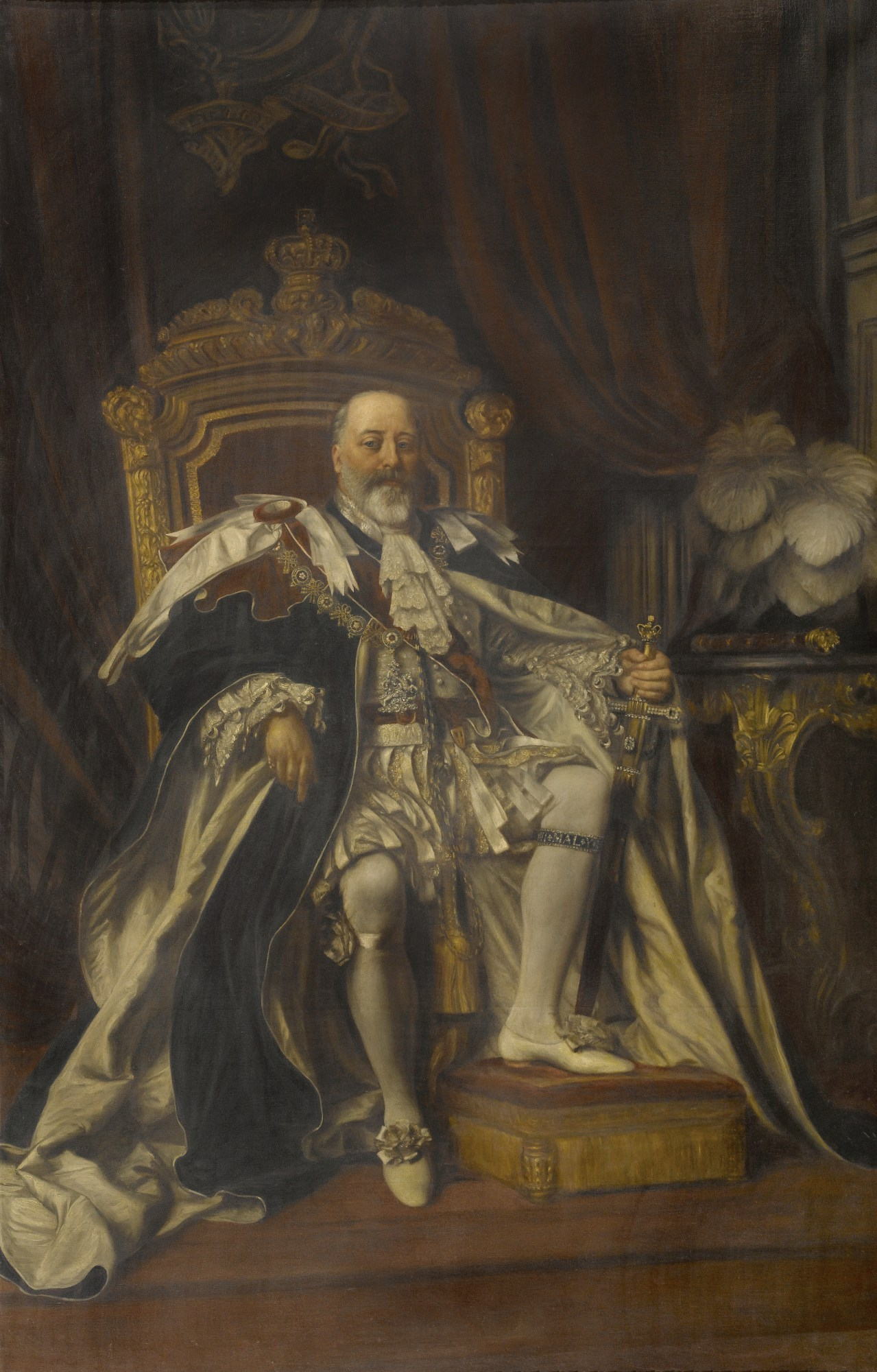
Portrait of Edward VII by Edward Poynter

Portrait of Mary Logsdail by William Logsdail

Portrait of Lady Margaret Sackville by George Henry

Portrait of John Tomlinson Brunner by Arthur Hacker

Portrait of Thomas Edward Collcutt by Arthur Stockdale Cope

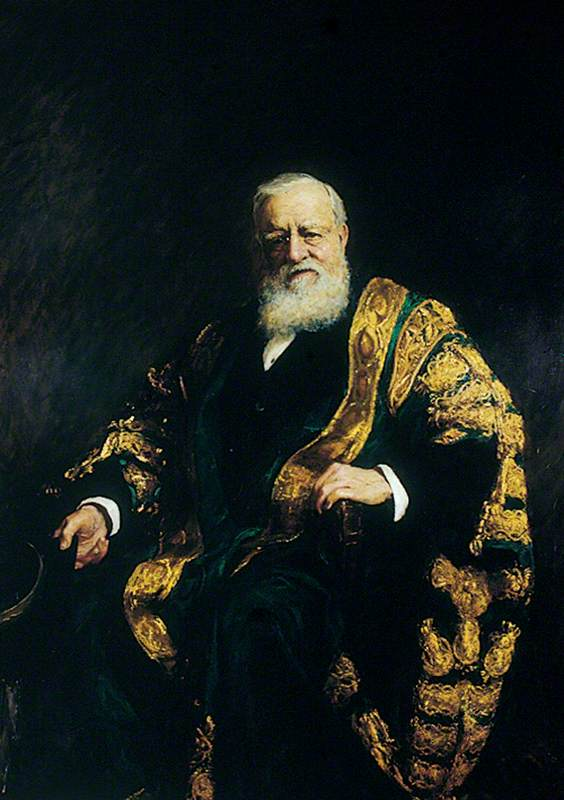
Portrait of the Marquess of Ripon by Hubert von Herkomer

Portrait of Lady Bullough by Hugh Goldwin Riviere

Portrait of Frank Benson by Hugh Goldwin Riviere

Portrait of William Longair by Solomon Joseph Solomon

== Bibliography ==
- Goodman, Jean. AJ: The Life of Alfred Munnings. Erskine Press, 2019.
- Harrington, Peter. British Artists and War: The Face of Battle in Paintings and Prints, 1700–1914. Greenhill Books, 1993.
- The Exhibition of the Royal Academy of Arts. Royal Academy, 1910
