= La Bataille d'Albuera: Espagnol =

1987 Napoleonic board game

- Cover art: Pointe d'Avant-Garde, 9th Hussards by Jean Baptiste Édouard Detaille
- Designers: Monte Mattson; Dennis A. Spors; Ed Wimble
- Illustrators: Rick Barber; Paul Dangel; Jean Baptiste Édouard Detaille
- Publishers: Clash of Arms
- Publication: 1987
- Genres: Napoleonic

La Bataille d'Albuera: Espagnol is a Napoleonic board wargame published by Clash of Arms in 1987 that simulates the Battle of Albuera (French: La Bataille d'Albuera) during the Peninsular War.

== Background ==
In the spring of 1811, an Anglo-Portuguese force under the command of General Sir William Beresford laid siege to the fortress of Badajoz, which was held by French forces. French Marshal Soult led an army of 24,000 from Andalusia in an attempt to break the siege. By the time his forces arrived, the Anglo-Portuguese forces had been reinforced by Spanish forces, bringing their number to 35,000. The French and Allied forces clashed at the small Spanish village of Albuera, about 20 kilometres (12 mi) south of Badajoz.

== Description ==
La Bataille d'Albuera: Espagnol is a two-player wargame in which one player controls French forces, while the other controls Allied forces. The game board is a 34" x 22" hex grid map scaled at 100 metres (110 yd) per hex. Over 400 double-sided counters represent the military units that participated in the battle.

=== Set up ===
The game begins with only a small contingent of British soldiers on the map. The Allied player can bring on further units as desired, in reaction to the French, who can move on to the map one of four ways, including a mass entry from one side of the map, or from several directions at once. Critic Gene Lee pointed out that "These setup variations provide Albuera with several very different games and a consequent high degree of replayability."

=== Gameplay ===
Information on the front of the counters only includes the unit's name and its movement factor. Other combat-related information is printed on the back of the counter. This introduces a "fog of war" to the battle, where the opposing player does not have full intelligence on the opposing forces until engaging them in battle.

The game uses an alternating "I Go, You Go" system, although with opportunities for the non-phasing player to act during the phasing player's turn. The French player is the first to be the phasing player:

- Phasing Player:
  - Charge
  - Movement
- Non-phasing player:
  - Defensive fire
- Phasing player:
  - Offensive fire
  - Melee
- Both players: Morale check

The Allied player then becomes the phasing player, and begins the entire sequence of events again. This completes one game turn, which represents 20 minutes of the battle.

=== Victory conditions ===
The French player wins by occupying all hexes of the village of Albuera, as well as exiting a few battalions off the map on a specific road. The Allied player wins by holding Albuera while maintaining a specified level of morale.

== Publication history ==
In 1975, Marshall Enterprises (originally Martial Enterprises) published the huge and complex Napoleonic board wargame La Bataille de la Moscowa, and went on to publish several large and complex Napoleonic games. In 1985, Clash of Arms acquired the rights to the "La Bataille" series of games, and in 1987 released La Bataille d'Albuera: Espagnol, designed by Monte Mattson, Dennis A. Spors and Ed Wimble using the same rule system from Marshall's previous "La Bataille" games, with interior art by Rick Barber and Paul Dangel. The cover image was a copy of Pointe d'Avant-Garde, 9th Hussards by 19th-century French artist Jean Baptiste Édouard Detaille.

== Reception ==
In Issue 6 of Games International, Mike Siggins liked the production values, writing, "The components live up to the high standard that have become the trademark of the 'La Bataille' series ... The overall effect is impressive and for many is the selling point of the games." Siggins liked the removal of the Franglais, noting that the "smattering of pidgin French [in previous rulebooks], combined with the equally badly written English, left most players completely stumped ... Thankfully, Clash of Arms have got down to tidying [the rules] up a bit and they are now better than the old set and have some degree of comprehensibility." Siggins also praised the rules system, writing that it was "still arguably the market leader in the grand tactical area." Siggins did find the game overly long, but concluded by giving it a rating of 4 out of 5, saying, "Albuera is in many ways very similar to its 'La Bataille' predecessors but because of the smaller, balanced battle and the interesting and colourful troops present, it is a real winner ... the system, pace of play and cavalry tussles all add excellent flavour ... this is a game that represents an ideal sampler for the 'La Bataille' system and is highly recommended."

In Issue 52 of the French games magazine Casus Belli, Marc Brandsma complained about the playability of the game, writing, ""In La Bataille d'Albuera, British infantry have the option of adopting a prone firing position. Very well, you might say, it was one of their tactical advantages. But it's a gimmick that's more realistic but adds nothing to the game. This is the problem with tactical games that are too abstract and too close to the supposed real constraints of combat: you practically have to spend three months learning poorly designed or poorly written rules. So there's no solution for these tactical Napoleonic games: what you gain in realism, you lose in playability."

In Issue 5 of Zone of Control, Gene Lee warned that this game was long — he estimated it would take experienced players three to five 8-hour sessions (24–40 hours) to complete a game. Lee suggested using a timed move rule would cut the length of the game in half "while realism and pleasure also rise significantly." Lee concluded by rating this game "Excellent" for gameplay and "Good" for historicity, writing, "Albuera is a visual treat and a mental delight ... [When] ostensibly unrelated minor rules ... are linked and exploited, one produces a battle narrative that is subtle and elegantly realistic."
