= La Bataille de Corunna–Espagnol =

Board wargame

Game box cover art by James Princip Beadle: "The Rearguard (Retreat to Corunna)"

La Bataille de Corunna–Espagnol is a board wargame published by Clash of Arms (CoA) in 1995 that simulates the Napoleonic-era Battle of Corunna.

== Background ==
In 1808, Napoleon's armies under the command of several French marshals invaded Spain, an ally of Great Britain at the time. The French attack failed to advance much past the Spanish border, but Napoleon himself came to Spain to rescue the situation. A British army under the command of Sir John Moore was stationed in Portugal, and Moore decided to assist the beleaguered Spaniards by having his army transported to the Spanish port of Corunna; they then marched inland. However, before Moore could arrive, Napoleon executed a number of brilliant victories against the Spaniards. Seeing the military situation as untenable, Moore ordered his army back to Corunna, where British Navy transports would evacuate them. Pursued by French forces under Marshal Jean de Dieu Soult, the British fought a series of rearguard actions before reaching the port. On 16 January 1809, the British artillery and cavalry had been loaded onto transports when Soult's army arrived. In order to evacuate as many infantry as possible, Moore's remaining forces would have to fight a holding action in the face of Soult's entire French army. At stake was the future of British involvement in the Peninsular War.

== Description ==
La Bataille de Corunna–Espagnol is a two-player board wargame in which one player controls the British forces trying to escape from Corunna via the sea, and the other player controls the French forces trying to destroy the British forces before they can escape.

=== Gameplay ===
With over 400 counters, two large 22" x 34" hex grid maps scaled at 100 m (110 yd) per hex, a 36-page rulebook and a 24-page scenario book, Corunna is a relatively complex game. Gameplay consists of a series of alternating turns. The first player has the following steps:

- Cavalry movement (charging if desired, followed by melée)
- Maneuver: Infantry and artillery move. This may attract fire from the other player under some circumstances.
- Ranged Fire
- Melée
- Reorganization

The second player has the same opportunities, completing one Game Turn, which represents 20 minutes of the battle.

=== Scenarios ===
There are three scenarios included with the game.

1. A minor engagement at Piedralonga the day before the main battle. To win, the French must have complete control of the village by the end of the last turn. This the best scenario for new players, since it is smaller and a good way to learn the rules.
2. A non-historical skirmish for control of the town of Corunna.
3. The historical battle of Corunna. The French have artillery, cavalry and infantry; the British have only infantry, the artillery and cavalry having already sailed away. After British morale due to casualties drops below a certain point, the British player designates a division to remain and act as a rearguard. The British player then wins by evacuating at least 60% of the other battalions. The French can win or at least draw by preventing this.

== Publication history ==
In 1977, CoA entered the board wargame market with La Bataille d'Auerstadt, a Napoleonic era game that used a complex game system. CoA continued to develop the same game system for use in a long line of Napoleonic games, and ensured that any updated rules system was backwardly compatible with their previously published games. La Bataille de Corunna–Espagnol, designed by J. Thomas Bailey with Ed Wimble, was published by CoA in 1995. The cover art was "The Rearguard (Retreat to Corunna)", a painting by British artist James Princip Beadle. Interior art and graphics were by Rick Barber, Ed Wimble and Paul Dangle. The game used the third edition of the Napoleonic rules set, but CoA published the 4th edition shortly afterward and recommended that Corunna and all previously published games be played using 4th edition rules.

== Reception ==
In Issue 44 of The Canadian Wargamers' Journal, Keith Martens wrote that this game "sports many improvements over any of the previous games. [...] The charts are much clearer than ever before and army morale is now simply a matter of killed and routed Battalions instead of an arduous strength point count."

In Issue 7 of Zone of Control, Monte Gray admired CoA's attention to historical detail, noting that "two French counters, the 15th and 86th regiments, feature white instead of the traditional blue backgrounds [...] because the troops had been issued with white uniforms due to an indigo dye shortage!" Gray did note some issues with the maps, commenting that there was no differentiation between towns and villages, and some of the terrain markings were ambiguous. But Gray found the game itself to be well-balanced and tense. He concluded by rating both the game and its innovations as 'Excellent', saying, "La Bataille buffs who are used to battling with hordes of cavalry and infantry across open spaces will find that Corunna gives a taste of a different kind of Napoleonic warfare. [...] Regardless of which side you choose, Corunna offers many hours of pleasurable play."

In Issue 90 of the French games magazine Casus Belli, Marc Brandsma liked the quality of the components, commenting, "The renowned quality of CoA productions is evident here; fans of beautiful maps and magnificent, colorful counters will be delighted. As for the game system, it is a highly detailed Napoleonic tactical simulation—complex to master, yet undeniably realistic." Brandsma concluded, "With three scenarios and few units on the map (around forty on each side), this game allows players to approach it as quick and fun."
