= Command at Sea =

WW2 naval wargame rules

- Cover of 4th edition rules, 2008
- Designers: Larry Bond; Chris Carlson; Ed Kettlers
- Publishers: Clash of Arms
- Publication: 1994
- Genres: World War II naval combat

Command at Sea is a set of miniatures wargame rules published by Clash of Arms (CoA) in 1994 that simulates naval combat during World War II. CoA subsequently published several scenario collections in the Command at Sea series.

== Description ==
Command at Sea is a miniatures wargame ruleset for naval combat scaled at 2 inches per nautical mile. It has been characterized as long (120 pages) and complex. The rules, designed by Larry Bond, Chris Carlson, and Ed Kettlers, were packaged as double-sided sheets punched for a 3-ring binder so that players could replace single pages that had been errated or updated rather than having to buy an entire updated set of rules.

The sequence of play uses two types of turns with two different time scales:

1. Intermediate Turn (each turn is 30 minutes)
  1. Plotting: All ship and aircraft plots for the turn are written down.
  2. Movement: All units on both sides are moved as plotted.
  3. Detection check: Players check to see if any enemy units are within detection range. If an enemy is detected, play moves to
2. Tactical Turn (each turn represents 3 minutes)
  1. Plotting: Similar to Intermediate Turn plotting, but only for 3 minutes, and fire combat is also plotted.
  2. Movement: All units are moved as plotted.
  3. Planned Fire: All plotted fire takes place.
  4. Detection Check: Players again check for undetected enemy units.
  5. Second Air Movement: Because aircraft travel so much faster than ships, they are given a second movement phase.
  6. Reaction Fire: Any weapon that was not fired during plotted fire may fire now.
  7. Resolution Phase: Air attacks against ships and defensive light antiaircraft fire are resolved. Also incremental damage from fires and flooding on the previous turn are resolved.

Players and critics immediately pointed to problems with fire resolution, saying that too much damage was being dealt with each hit, meaning combat was short and bloody rather than long and prolonged. There were also issues with calculating damage using turret systems, since the algorithm used favored two-gun turrets over three-gun turrets. Various other problems cropped up including inaccuracies with basic gun accuracy, ranges, and armor penetration values.

Due to this feedback, the rules underwent an immediate revision, resulting in a 2nd edition being released in 1995. Over the years, CoA produced several more editions, up to the 5th edition published in 2025.

In support of the ruleset, CoA published several different collections of scenarios set in various theaters of the war, including The Rising Sun (Pacific Theater, 1994); Supermarina I (1995) and Supermarina II (1997), both set in the Mediterranean; and No Sailor But a Fool (1997), which simulated various shore skirmishes using small craft.

Command at Sea was relatively costly for the time, leading some to say that it was "the worst of two worlds: priced like a board game, but produced like a set of miniatures rules."

== Reception ==
In Issue 45 of The Canadian Wargaming Journal, Rob Elliot reviewed the second edition, and was disappointed that Japanese naval and weapons statistics, which had been published with the 1st edition rules, had been dropped from this edition. Elliot pointed out that this meant The Rising Sun — the first batch of scenarios set in the Pacific Theater using the 1st edition rules — was no longer supported by the 2nd edition rules. However, Elliot was pleased that many of the complaints made by players about the 1st edition had been resolved in a brand new "Surface Combat" section that dealt with new damage systems and ranges, and modified armor penetration. Elliot concluded, "The net effect of these changes is that combat, especially between evenly matched heavy ships at long or extreme range, is a much more drawn out affair and is much closer to the historic outcomes when neither side made the decision to 'engage the enemy more closely.'"

In Issue 7 of Zone of Control, Terry Rooker commented that the 2nd edition was "so ambitious that some of the early complaints [about the 1st edition] seem unduly harsh. The system aims at being the most comprehensive set of naval rules in the hobby." Rooker warned, "Due to the quantity of rules, players will have to work into it gradually." Rooker felt that the changes to damage and ranging rules resulted in a game that "now seems much more realistic as a result." Rooker concluded, "Clash of Arms should be congratulated on tightening up a mammoth set of rules that was already pretty good."
