= Laing Art Gallery =

Art gallery in Newcastle, England

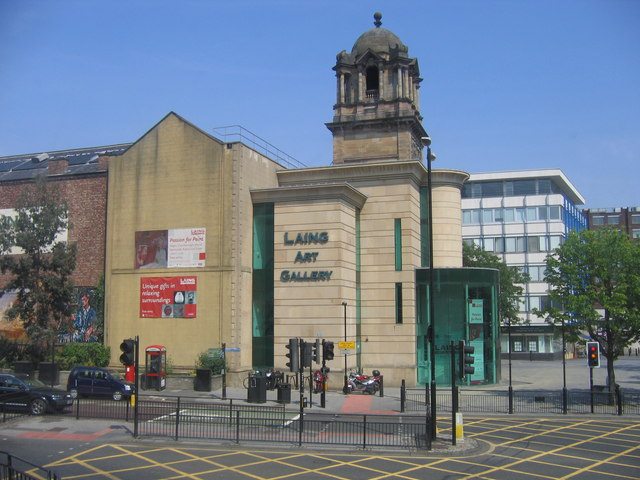
- Laing Art Gallery

- Laing Art Gallery shown within Tyne and Wear; OS grid reference NZ251645
- Interactive fullscreen map
- Location: Newcastle upon Tyne, England
- Coordinates: 54°58′30″N 1°36′32″W
- Website: www.northeastmuseums.org.uk/laing

The Laing Art Gallery in Newcastle upon Tyne, England, is located on New Bridge Street West. The gallery was designed in the Baroque style with Art Nouveau elements by architects Cackett & Burns Dick and is now a Grade II listed building. It was opened in 1904 and is now managed by North East Museums and sponsored by the Department for Culture, Media and Sport. In front of the gallery is the Blue Carpet. The building, which was financed by a gift from a local wine merchant, Alexander Laing, is Grade II listed.

The gallery collection contains paintings, watercolours and decorative historical objects, including Newcastle silver. In the early 1880s, Newcastle was a major glass producer in the world and enamelled glasses by William Beilby are on view along with ceramics (including Maling pottery), and diverse contemporary works by emerging UK artists. It has a programme of regularly rotating exhibitions.

The gallery's collection of paintings includes John Martin's dramatic The Destruction of Sodom and Gomorrah, as well as works by Sir Joshua Reynolds, Edward Burne-Jones (Laus Veneris), Isabella and the Pot of Basil from 1868 by William Holman Hunt, and Ben Nicholson. Local paintings include pictures by Ralph Hedley. There is also a collection of 18th- and 19th-century watercolours and drawings, including work by J. M. W. Turner and John Sell Cotman.

== Gallery ==
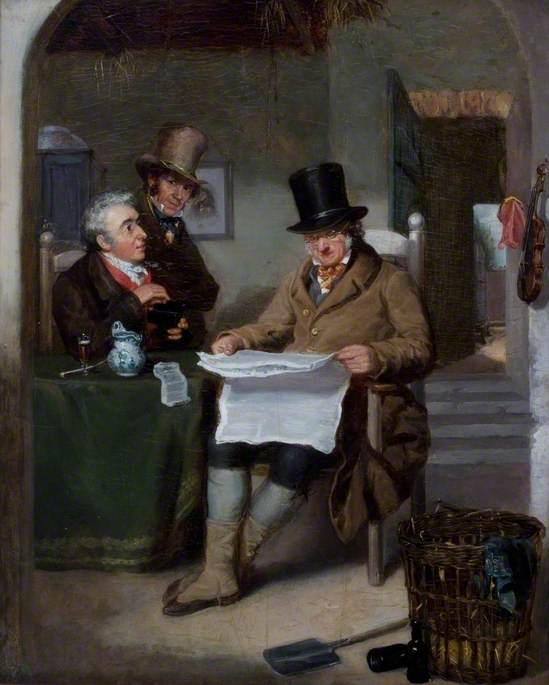
Reading the News by David Wilkie, 1820

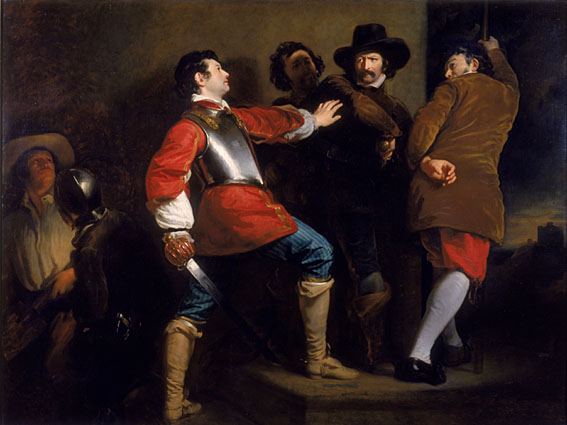
The Discovery of the Gunpowder Plot by Henry Perronet Briggs, 1823

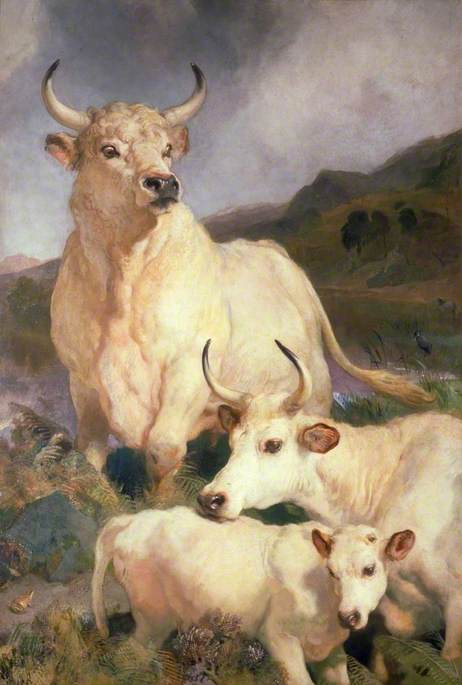
Wild Cattle of Chillingham by Edwin Landseer, 1867

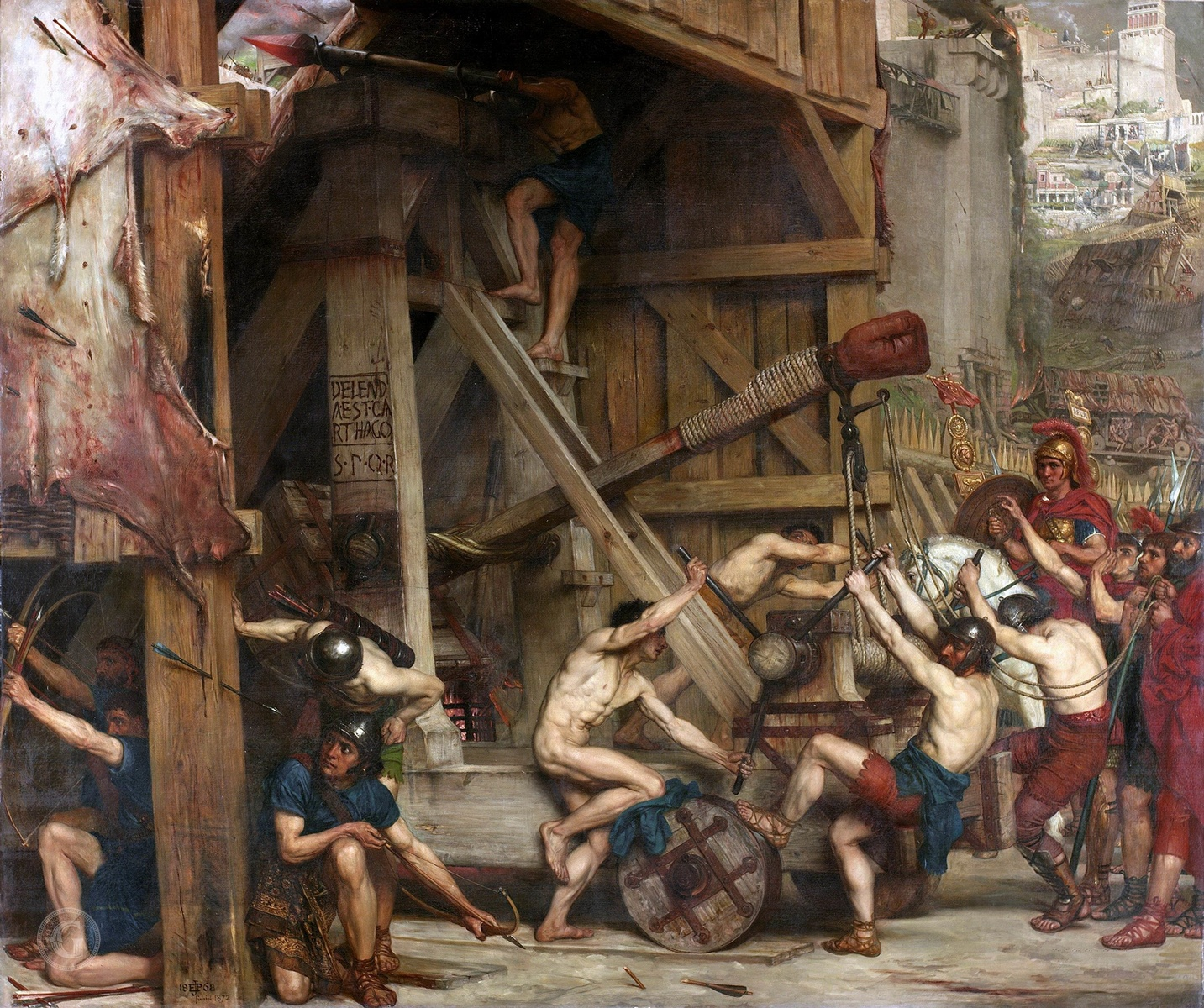
The Catapult by Edward Poynter, 1867

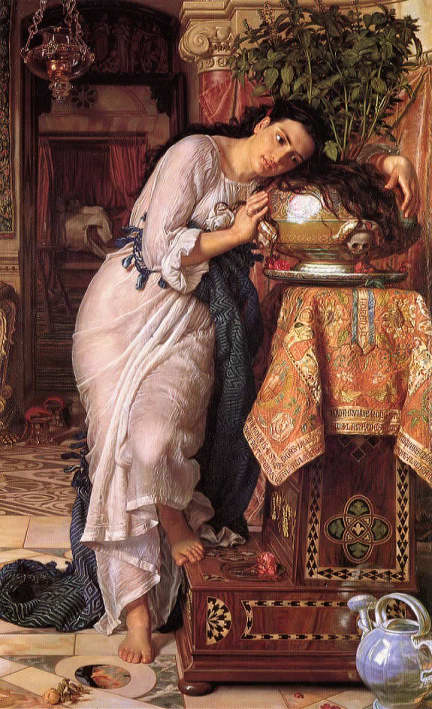
Isabella and the Pot of Basil by William Holman Hunt, 1868

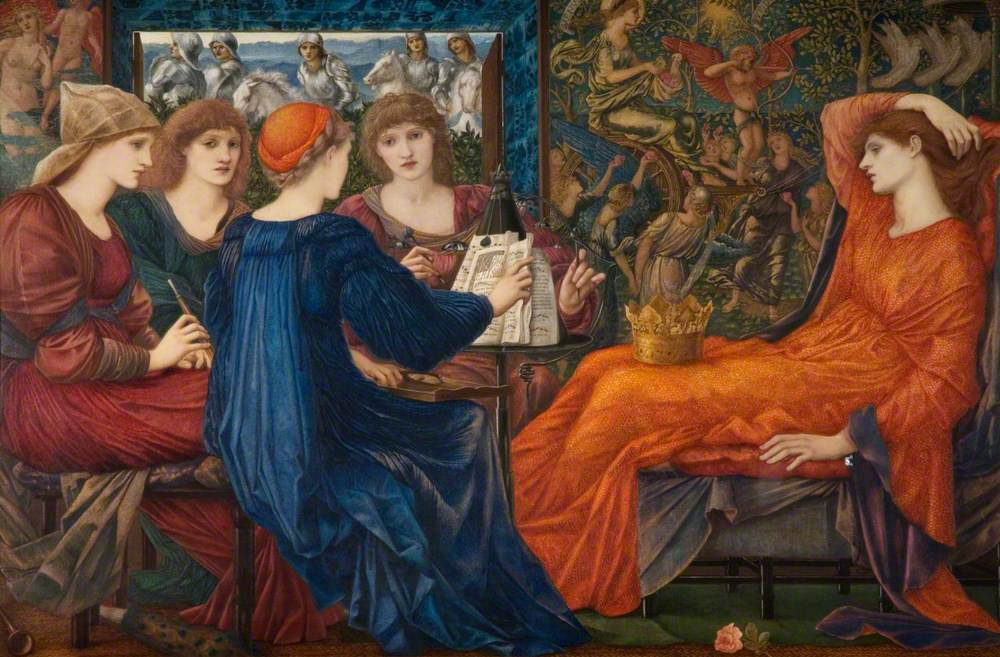
Laus Veneris by Edward Burne-Jones, 1873

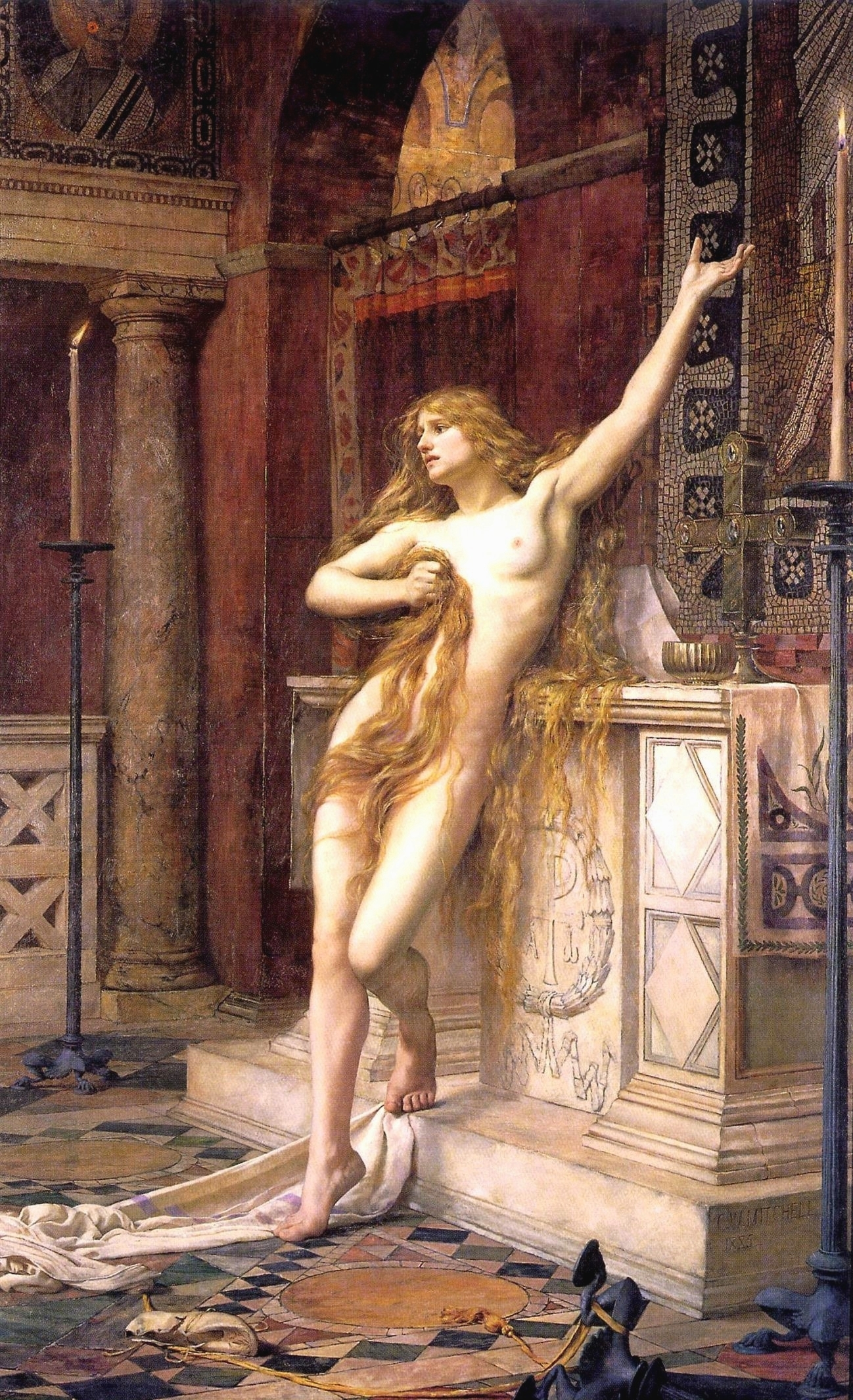
Hypatia by Charles William Mitchell, 1885

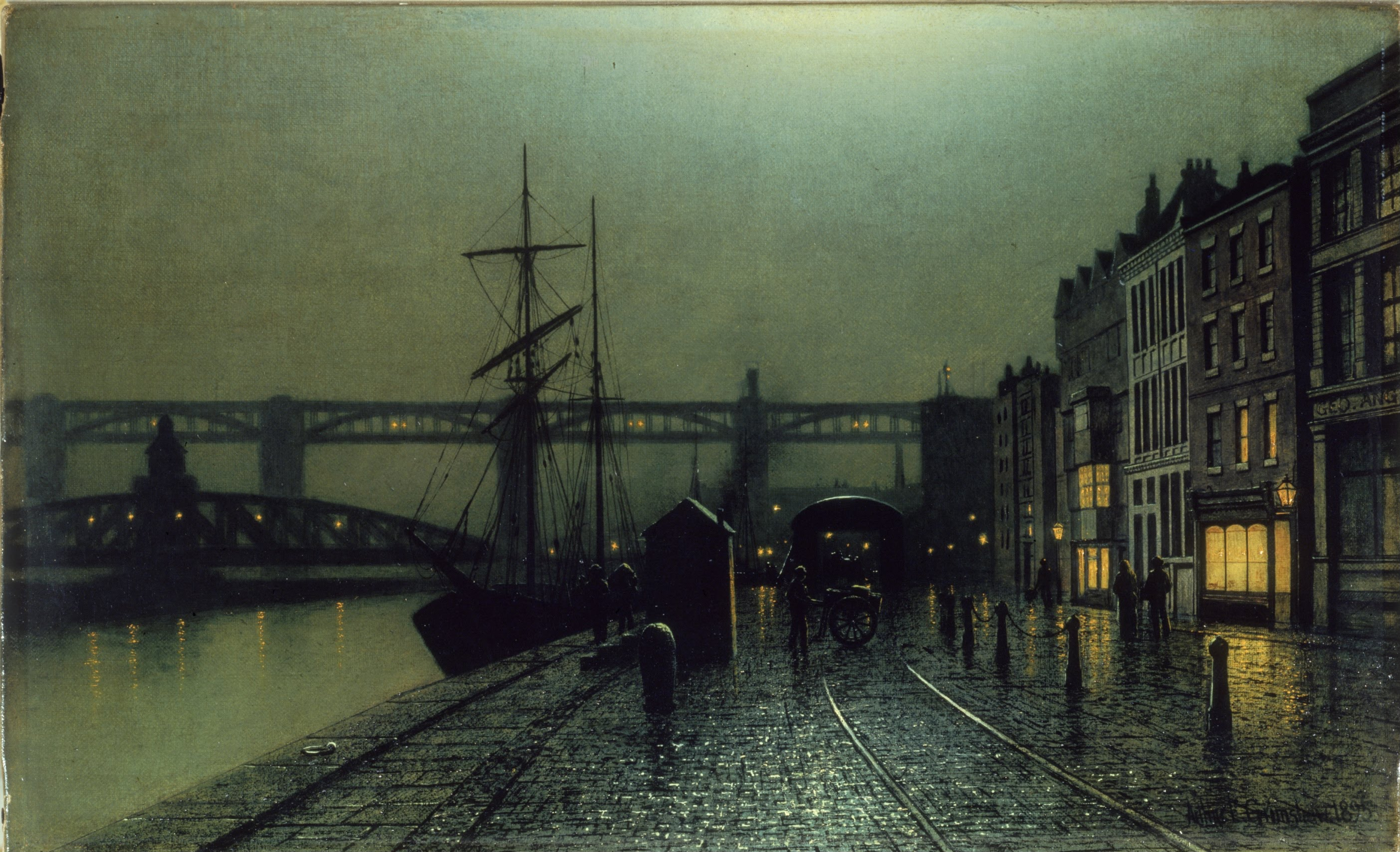
The Quayside, Newcastle upon Tyne by Arthur Edmund Grimshaw, 1895

The Women by John Charlton, 1910
