= John Charlton (artist) =

English painter

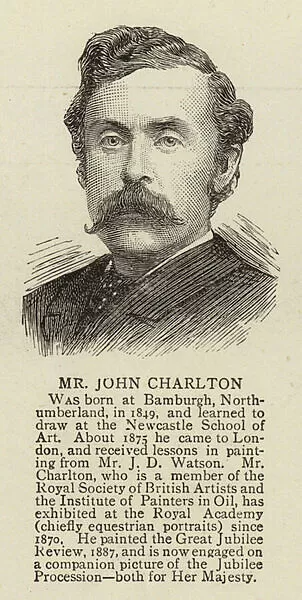
John Charlton, in 1890

John Charlton (1849–1917) was an English painter and illustrator of historical and especially battle scenes, mainly from history contemporary to him.

== Early life ==
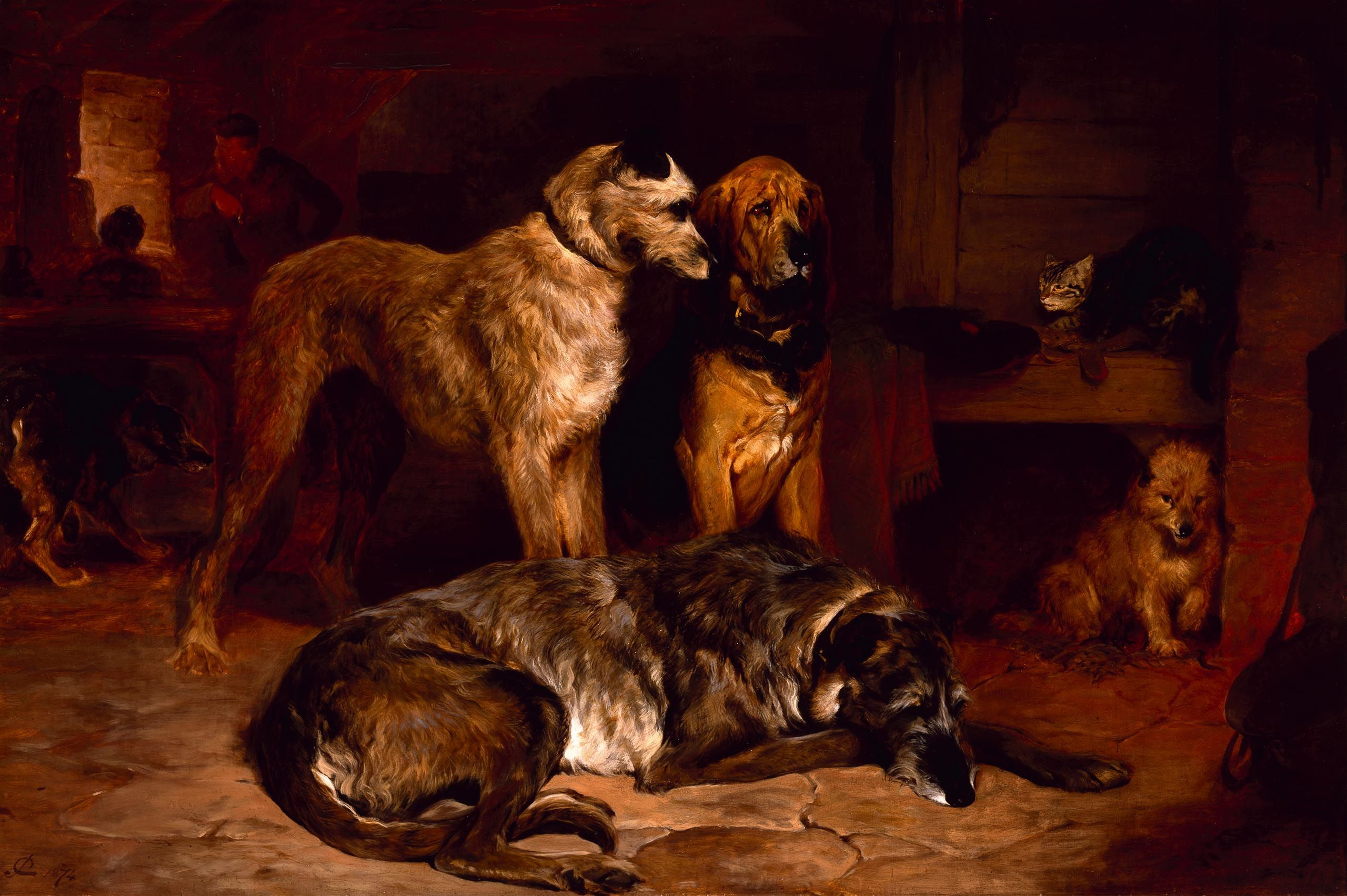
More Free Than Welcome, by John Charlton, RBA, RI, ROI

Born to Samuel Charlton and his wife Mary Ann (née Pickering) Charlton on 28 June 1849, in Bamburgh, Northumberland, he received his first lessons in drawing from his father when he was only three or four years old, and within a few years was drawing horses with some skill. Due to his family's financial misfortunes, he had to attend Dr. Sharp's charity school held in Bamburgh's great castle, and a few years later, was forced to quit and find employment. A job in the Newcastle bookshop of Mr. Robinson, a keen collector of the work of Thomas Bewick, "the father of wood engraving,” gave him an appreciation of graphic art. It was here that the budding artist began to imitate the master's work, much to the delight of two of Bewick's ageing sisters. Later he spent seven monotonous years employed in the office of Sir Isaac Bell's ironworks, but seeing the young man's skill at draughtsmanship, his employers regularly granted him one day a week in which to practice his art. Mr. Joseph Crawhill suggested that he attend evening classes at the Newcastle School of Arts under William Bell Scott. During this time he began to develop quite a reputation on Tyneside as a painter of horses and dogs, and he received some commissions to portray family pets.

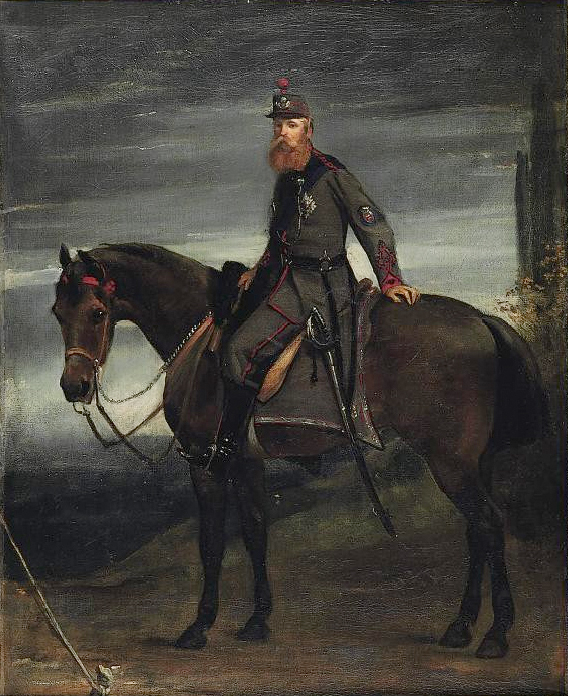
John Poyntz, 5th Earl Spencer (1835–1910)

He debuted at the Royal Academy in 1870, and his first painting with a military theme, Exercising artillery horses on a frosty morning, appeared three years later. Realising that his best prospects for advancement lay in the London art world, he ventured south in 1874 and took classes at the South Kensington Museum, now the Victoria and Albert Museum, under J. D. Watson. While he settled in the capital, he never forgot his northern roots, maintaining a house at 24 Windsor Terrace, Newcastle, and at one time lived at Cullercoats, while his final years were spent at Lanercost in Cumbria.

The late 1870s and 1880s were a very busy time for British and colonial forces as they tried to consolidate colonial hold over possessions in northern and southern Africa. Many of the illustrations appearing in The Graphic depicting these events came from the hand of Charlton, especially during the Egyptian Campaign of 1882, when he had to draw-up many of the eye-witness sketches posted to the paper by its 'special artists' as well as soldiers. It was also during 1882 that he married Kate, daughter of Thomas Vaughan, J.P. of Ugthorp Lodge, Cleveland.

== Military paintings ==
Exposed to the wealth of military illustration he decided to try his hand at creating a large painting on canvas using a war theme, and in 1883 exhibited British artillery entering the enemy’s lines at Tel-el-Kebir, 13 September 1882. It was well received, one writer asking, "who can look unmoved upon his vigorous and vividly realistic rendering." Spurred on by the success of this work which "opened up for him a field in which he could find freer scope for his artistic sense of vivid movement and powerful action in both horse and figure-painting, and exercise for his keen imagination," he chose another military scene for his 1887 academy piece. Based on a sketch by Surgeon N. C. Ross of the Royal Marines, Bad news from the front represented the first news of the disaster to General McNeill's column during the Suakim campaign of 1885: "A number of horses of the Bengal Lancers having broken through the zeriba [thorn-bush stockade] in confusion, galloped back to headquarters, and created much excitement and alarm, it being conjectured that some terrible disaster had befallen the advance column." He returned to the Sudan campaign for his 1893 piece, Placing the Guns, the same year his wife died leaving him to look after their two young sons.

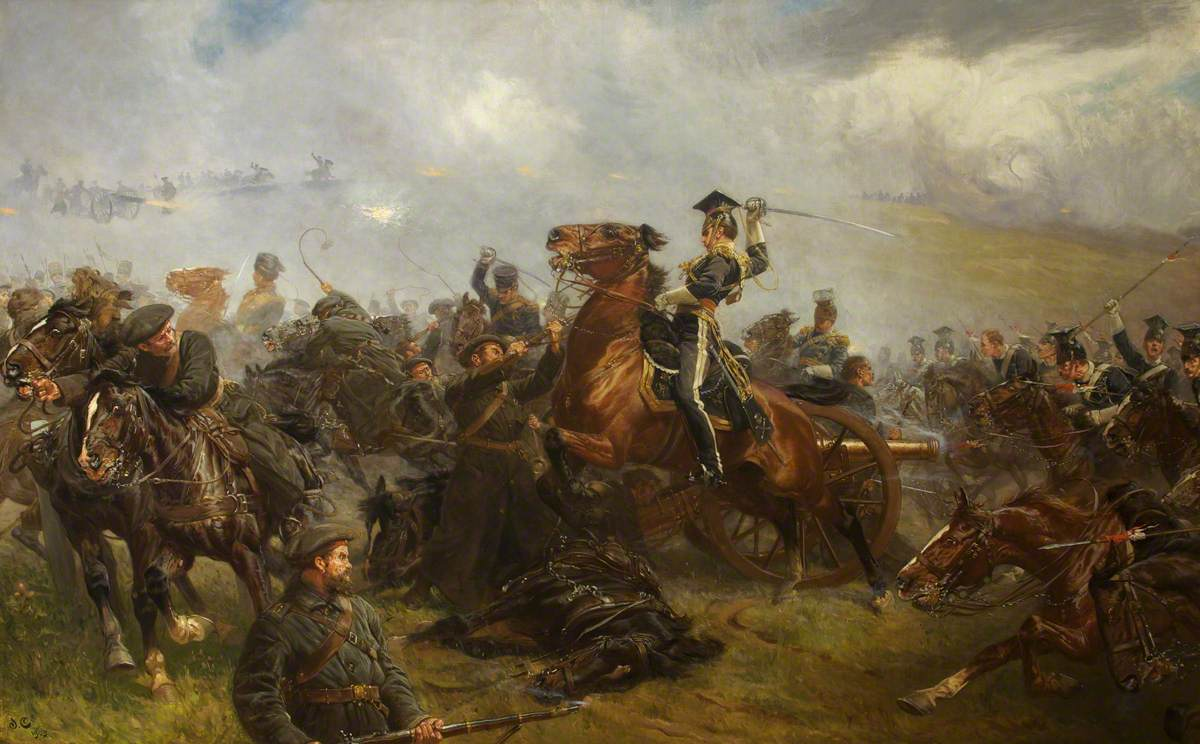
Captain Godfrey Morgan (1831–1913), later Lord Tredegar, at the Balaklava Charge

For his next military subject, Charlton turned once again to men and horses in battle with a theme from the Zulu War: After the charge: 17th Lancers, Ulundi, 4 July 1879, which was shown at Burlington House in 1888. The regiment was to figure again later in the artist's work. Some years previously, he had painted a portrait of Lord Tredegar who had led the lancers out of the fateful charge at Balaklava on 25 October 1854, and no doubt inspired by hearing the nobleman's account during the sittings as well as reading Kinglake's history of the Crimean War, Charlton exhibited several paintings of the charge. An Incident in the charge of the Light Brigade was shown at the academy in 1889, while in 1897 came Comrades, showing just two figures, a trooper of the 17th Lancers lying dead on the field while his horse rears in agony having been hit by a bullet. Tredegar also supplied the sketch for the artist's 1905 picture, Balaclava: The Charge of the Light Brigade showing the 17th Lancers crashing into the Russian guns, that was reproduced as the Christmas Supplement to The Graphic.

Charlton occasionally turned to wars from earlier periods or foreign wars not involving Britain, such as After the battle: Sedan, based on an incident in the Franco-Prussian War of 1870 described by Émile François Zola in La Debâcle. In this piece, Charlton chose one of his favourite themes, that of riderless horses after a battle, in this case in a mad gallop "across the blank, silent country." Scenes from the Peninsular War and the English Civil War followed, while his painting of Prussian General Seidlitz at the Battle of Rossbach in 1757 was shown at the Berlin Art Gallery in April 1914. It attracted the attention of a wealthy German who offered to buy the piece, but before the sale could be finalised, war broke out and the picture was 'interned' in Germany.

== World War One ==
The Great War brought the pain and suffering of soldiers in battle directly home to Charlton. While he did attempt to record the early days of the war in two canvases painted in 1915 that now hang in Laing Art Gallery, and at Gateshead Art Gallery, nothing prepared him for the tragedy that hit hard in 1916. On 24 June, his eldest son, Lieutenant Hugh Vaughan Charlton of the 7th Northumberland Fusiliers, was killed on the Western Front aged 32. Seven days later, his youngest son, Captain John Macfarlane Charlton, serving in the 21st Northumberland Fusiliers (2nd Tyneside Scottish), a keen ornithologist and author, was killed in action on the first day of the Somme, his 25th birthday. In a poignant canvas, now lost, the two bright young men sit with their grandmother; while in another painting by their father entitled The Brothers H.V.C. and J.M.C., Sandisdyke, two handsome and promising young men with their three dogs look up to the viewer. Heartbroken, the artist painted a posthumous portrait of John that was exhibited in the spring of 1917 alongside Sunset: Cumberland, 28 Sep 1916.

== Death and assessment ==
The shock of the loss of his two sons on the Western Front was too much to bear and on 10 November 1917, while the war still raged, Charlton died after a brief illness at Banks House, Lanercost at the age of 68. "He felt the loss of his two suns profoundly," read his obituary in The Graphic. On the wall of St. Mary Magdalene, Lanercost Priory, are memorials to the artist and his two sons. During his career, Charlton never gained much attention beyond his picture of the Diamond Jubilee. He created numerous illustrations for The Graphic but his oil paintings of military and battle scenes were rarely mentioned in the reviews. And his paintings of the Great War were criticised as being anachronistic and better suited to the previous century. Nonetheless, his paintings are dramatic and well-executed with careful attention to detail, and he certainly ranks among his contemporaries, Richard Caton Woodville, James Princip Beadle and William Barnes Wollen as one of Britain's preeminent 'battle' painters of the late Victorian period.

== Paintings ==
The Women, 1910

- After the Charge: 17th Lancers, Ulundi, 4 July 1879 (1883 – Queen's Royal Lancers)
- British Artillery entering the Enemy's Lines at Telel-Kebir, 13 September 1882 (1883 – Nottingham Art Gallery & Museum)
- Incident in the Charge of the Light Brigade, Balaclava, 25 October 1854 (1889 – Blackburn Art Gallery and Museum)
- Advance on Kimberley: The 16th and 17th Lancers at Klip Drift (1908 – Naval and Military Club, London)
- The Fifth Dragoon Guards at Elandslaagte, South Africa (1913 – Royal Dragoon Guards)
- French Artillery crossing the flooded Aisne (1915 – Laing Art Gallery, Newcastle upon Tyne)
- Retreat from the Marne (1915 – Shipley Art Gallery, Gateshead)
