= The King's War =

1989 board wargame

- Cover of the original 1989 edition
- Designers: Charles Vasey
- Illustrators: Rick Barber
- Publishers: 1989: Pike & Shot Society; 1995: Clash of Arms
- Publication: 1989
- Genres: English Civil War

The King's War, subtitled "The First English Civil War 1642-1646", is a board wargame published by The Pike & Shot Society in 1989 that simulates the English Civil War.

== Background ==
In the early 1630s, Charles I of England enraged Parliament with his insistence that the divine right of kings superseded parliamentary powers. This eventually devolved into a civil war between the Royalists and the Parliamentarians, with the throne of England at stake.

== Description ==
King's War is a board wargame for 2 players, where one player controls Parliamentary forces, while the other controls Royalist forces.

=== Components ===
The game box includes 500 counters — of which 50 are leaders — a 32-page rulebook, various player aids, and a 22" x 34" map of England and Wales, divided into regions.

=== Gameplay ===
The game uses a simple "I Go, You Go" sequence, where one player moves and attacks, sieges castles and towns, and checks desertion and recruitment. The other player then has the same opportunities.

Each player has a limited number of campaign points, which cover the finance and logistics of the game, and impact movement, recruitment, and control of territory. If there are unused campaign points at the end of a turn, the player can carry half of them forward into the next turn.

Most units and leaders can move anywhere on the map. A few notable exceptions include

- the Scottish Covenanters, who enter the map from Scotland as a Parliamentary ally, but cannot move anywhere until the Parliamentary player has captured York and Newcastle.
- The leader known as the Royal Northern generalissimo cannot move out of the Northern region of England.

There are no rules for fleets, naval combat or naval invasions, although units can be ferried from one port to another.

=== Sieges ===
Players can construct up to four walled towns, and own minor forts and full fortresses. Each player can besiege any of these belonging to the other side. The besieger can make assaults, while the defender can make sorties. The siege's progress is measured by a "battering number", which can be reduced by defensive sorties, make the length of a siege highly uncertain.

If a relief force appears, the besieger has the choice of maintaining the siege, which will detract from battle performance, or lifting the siege to effectively fight the relief force, which will delay the outcome of the siege.

"Ambuscade" counters are drawn during the siege, representing treachery within the fortress, and can shorten the siege or perhaps even force the fortress to surrender without a fight.

=== Scenarios ===
The game comes with seven scenarios, none of which use the entire map. Together the scenarios cover all major phases of the war. Players can chronologically link the scenarios to create a long campaign game.

== Publication history ==
The King's War was designed by Charles Vasey, with artwork by Rick Barber. It was published by The Shot & Pike Society in 1989. Six years later, Clash of Arms (CoA) republished the game with a redrawn map.

== Reception ==
Games International called this "far from perfect but [with] solid play value within a historical structure. It has also managed to simulate a number of manoeuvres which most other games have failed to cover (especially marching and counter-marching) ... it puts one closer to the actual commander than most strategic games."

In Issue 7 of the French games magazine Vae Victis, Théophile Monnier reviewed the 1995 edition by CoA and noted "the rules are fairly straightforward (around fifteen pages); however, like many Clash of Arms products, they lack precision and often contain confusing explanations." Monnier was disappointed in the play of game, commenting, "The main drawback of The King's War is that it is not a strictly military simulation — battles are never decisive, and regions can easily be lost and retaken — yet it offers no political alternatives or management systems, such as diplomacy or shifting alliances. Games are long, and players are largely at the mercy of recruitment issues and desertions." Monnier also pointed out that while counters for a French invasion were included in the original 1989 edition, the rules for such an invasion were only published in 1995 in the Decision Games edition. Monnier concluded, "Given these flaws — and despite the simulation's realism — The King's War is primarily aimed at 17th-century enthusiasts."

John A. Walker, writing for Zone of Control, reviewed the CoA edition and noted "To those who have long wanted an in-depth treatment of this conflict, the appearance of The King's War is a welcome event." Walker liked the quality of the components, especially the map, calling it "suitable for gaming or framing." Walker also liked the clarity of the rules, commenting, "The designer writes clearly and well, and the impression one gets is that he was bored with no aspect of his design." However, Walker pointed out that designer Vasey was perhaps too enthusiastic for the subject and had included "some colorful but inessential rules ... Devotees of generalism will find [this] Dickensian superfluous detail a pain in the rump." Walker warned "Its scholarship and completeness are alike commendable — but anyone who desires the Cliff's Notes version of this conflict should look elsewhere. For very few will the firm grip on history be the game's main attraction." Despite this, Walker concluded by giving this game "Excellent" grades for gameplay and historicity, writing, "The crown of any successful game is whether it holds out the prospect of interesting play. The King's War does most royally, and earns my highest recommendation."

== Other reviews and commentary ==
- Berg's Review of Games #20
