= Supermarina I =

WW2 naval wargame

- Cover art by Rick Barber
- Designers: John D. Gresham; Michael Markowitz
- Illustrators: Rick Barber
- Publishers: Clash of Arms
- Publication: 1995
- Genres: World War II naval combat

Supermarina I, subtitled "Command at Sea Volume II: The First Part of the Mediterranean War", is a miniatures wargame published by Clash of Arms (CoA) in 1995 that simulates naval combat in the Mediterranean during the first years of World War II. It was the second game in the Command at Sea series.

== Description ==
Supermarina I is a miniatures wargame that uses counters representing ships, as well as the complex naval combat rules system developed by CoA called Command at Sea. The scale used by the game is 2 inches per nautical mile, and each game turn represents 30 minutes.

=== Components ===
The game, packaged in shrink-wrap, includes 420 counters representing ships and airplanes of the Italian and British navies, as well as a 120-page copy of the second edition of the Command at Sea miniatures rules, a 96-page book of data on the ships and aircraft, a 64-page book of historical commentary and scenarios based on naval combat in the Mediterranean from 1939 to 1941, and a 16-page "Jumpstart" rules synopsis to allow players to get started without having to read all of the miniatures rules.

Players can use miniatures of ships in place of the counters. The scenarios run the gamut from air strikes, duels between battleships, and torpedo boat attacks on convoys, to a harbor raid using small craft.

== Publication history ==
In 1994, CoA published a long and complex set of rules for World War II naval miniatures combat called Command at Sea, as well as The Rising Sun: Command at Sea, Volume I, a package of scenarios set in the Pacific Theater. In 1995, CoA published a second edition of the Command at Sea rules as well as the second volume of scenarios, Supermarina I, designed by John D. Gresham and Michael Markowitz, with cover art by Rick Barber. Supermarina I was considered to be relatively costly for the time — $50 — leading some to say that it was "the worst of two worlds: priced like a board game, but produced like a set of miniatures rules."

CoA would go on to publish a long line of scenarios using the Command at Sea rules, starting with No Sailor But a Fool (1997), and Supermarina II (1997).

== Reception ==
In Issue 45 of The Canadian Wargaming Journal, Rob Elliot found the scenarios "very well written", calling them "the real heart of the game." But Elliot didn't understand why the "Jumpstart" rules had been included, since they were based on the out-dated first edition of the Command at Sea rules, writing, "The idea of a rules synopsis is a very good one, but the lack of an updated one for Supermarina seems to indicate that the game was rushed into production." Elliot found several of the scenarios "do a wonderfully good job of showing how radically different the historic outcomes could have been if either or both of the commanders had been more aggressive." However, Elliot was disappointed that scenarios involving the French fleet had not been included. He also pointed out that statistics on German weapons had been included, but there were no statistics or information for German ships, making the weapons information superfluous. Elliot concluded, "Although Supermarina I does not cover all of the battles up to July 1941 and omits the French entirely, it does accomplish its aim of realistically simulating Mediterranean naval warfare in the early years of the Second World War. In doing so, it does a good job of increasing the knowledge base in the hobby on this fascinating period."

In Issue 7 of Zone of Control, Terry Rooker warned, "Due to the quantity of rules, players will have to work into it gradually." Rooker had issues with the tracking rules, specifically that once a ship has been detected, the player can continue to track it. As Rooker pointed out, "Especially with WWII-era sensors, this was not the case." He also pointed out that there was no provision in the rules for "false positives", where, especially at long range, a player might think there is a contact when there is not one. Rooker concluded, "If you're a casual player, then the expense is probably not worthwhile. If you're a dedicated WWII naval gamer, then you will easily recover your investment — the system is so comprehensive, you won't run out of gaming ideas anytime soon."

== Awards ==
Supermarina I won a Special Achievement Award at the 1995 Origins Awards.
