= Blue Carpet =

Public artwork in Newcastle-Upon-Tyne, England

Coordinates: 54.9745°N 1.6092°W

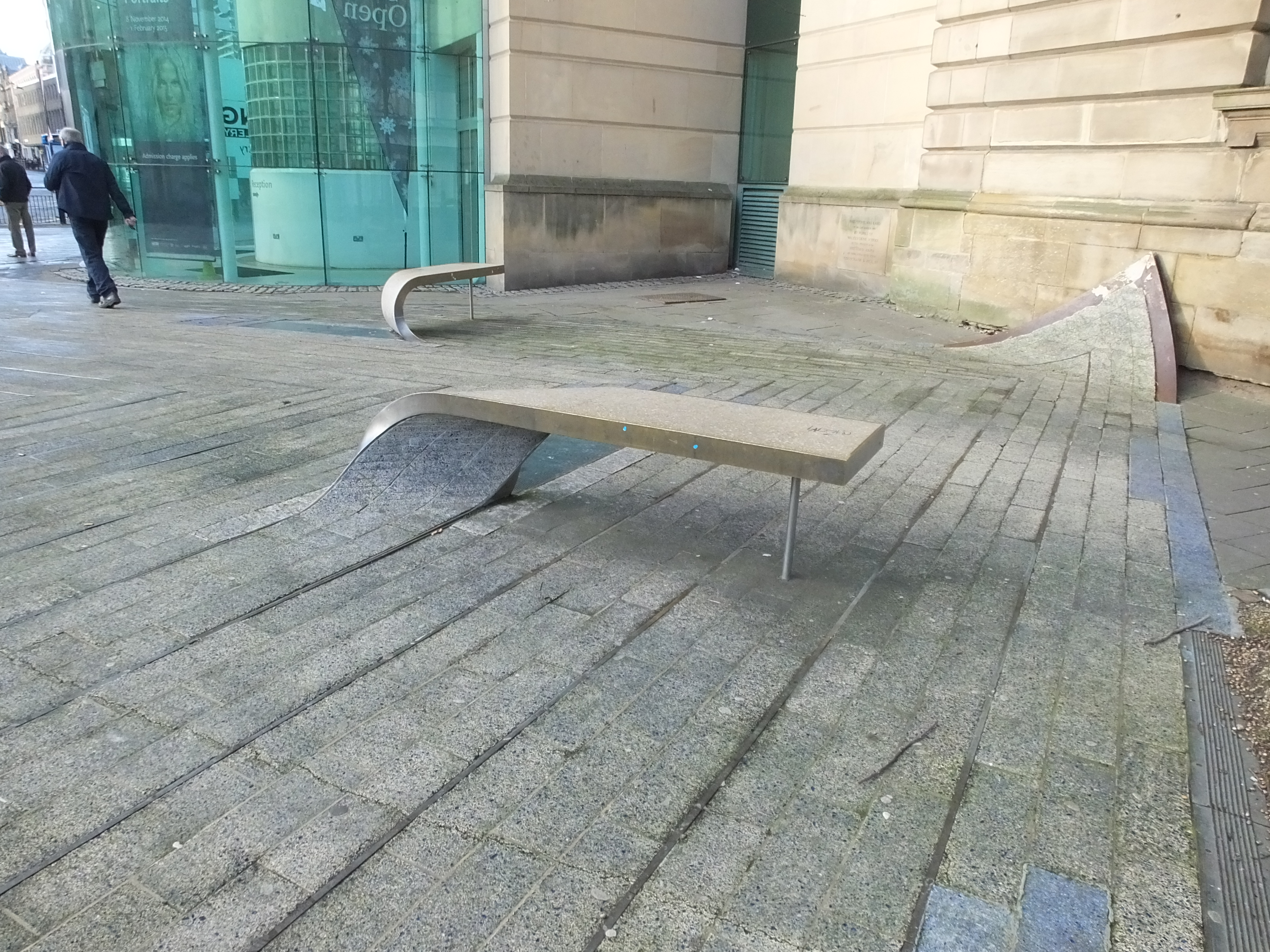
At the points where this skin reaches a building the slabs curve upwards to create the sensation that the tiles are a fabric laid over the area.

The Blue Carpet is a piece of public art in Newcastle-Upon-Tyne, England, designed by Thomas Heatherwick. It is an area of public open space in front of the Laing Art Gallery, close to the main shopping and nightclub areas, paved with glass-and-resin slabs which curve up at the space's edges, giving the appearance of a fabric carpet. Although classified as a piece of public art, it is closer to an urban design feature.

== Artwork ==
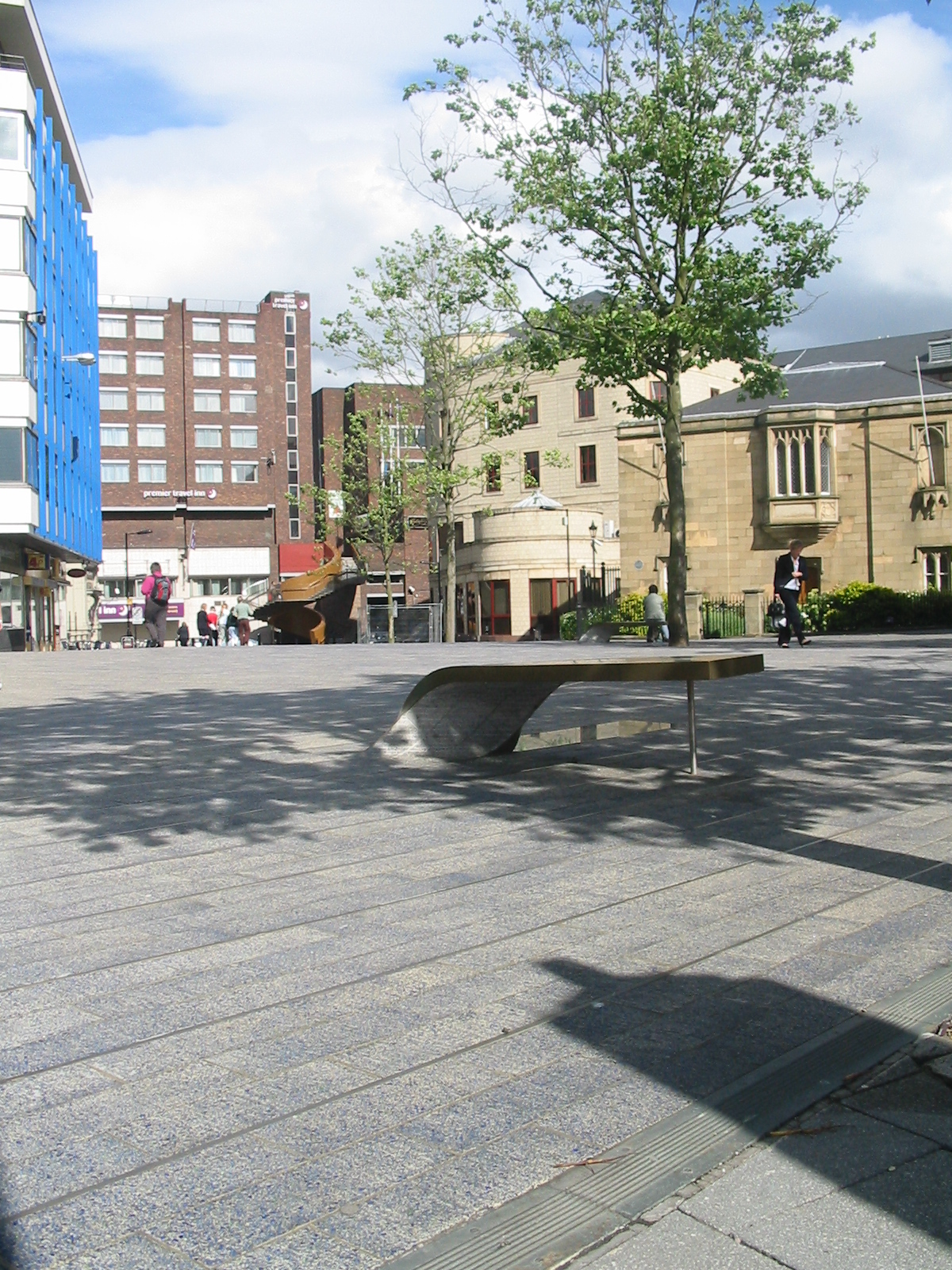
The Blue Carpet. The tiles were originally a much deeper shade of blue.

The square has been covered in a skin of blue paving slabs, made by mixing crushed blue glass with white resin. At the points where this skin reaches a building the slabs curve upwards to create the sensation that the tiles are a fabric laid over the area. There are a number of benches that appear to fold up from the carpet surface, and beneath the benches are sunken glass-topped boxes that hold coloured lights. At the eastern end an existing staircase, leading to an elevated walkway, was replaced with a new one, featuring a curving skin of wood ribbons, constructed by a local boatbuilder.

== Setting ==
Completed in 2001, the piece took six years to realise. The total budget for the space was £1.4m. The work was partially funded by the Arts Lottery Fund and the European Regional Development Fund. Following the success of Anthony Gormley's Angel of the North in nearby Gateshead, Newcastle and other neighbouring authorities were keen to invest in other high profile public art commissions. Heatherwick's design provided was an integral part of a project to improve the streetscape and context of the Laing Art Gallery, which was left marooned following the demolition of the old Victorian library in the 1960s, with a blank brick wall facing towards the city centre.

The Blue Carpet was intended to complement the existing buildings and give the city a contemporary icon. However, the first batch of tiles delivered were green rather than blue and the whole project was set back several months. When finally unveiled it was remarked that the carpet was much paler in colour than was expected from Heatherwick's original visualisations.

== Current status ==
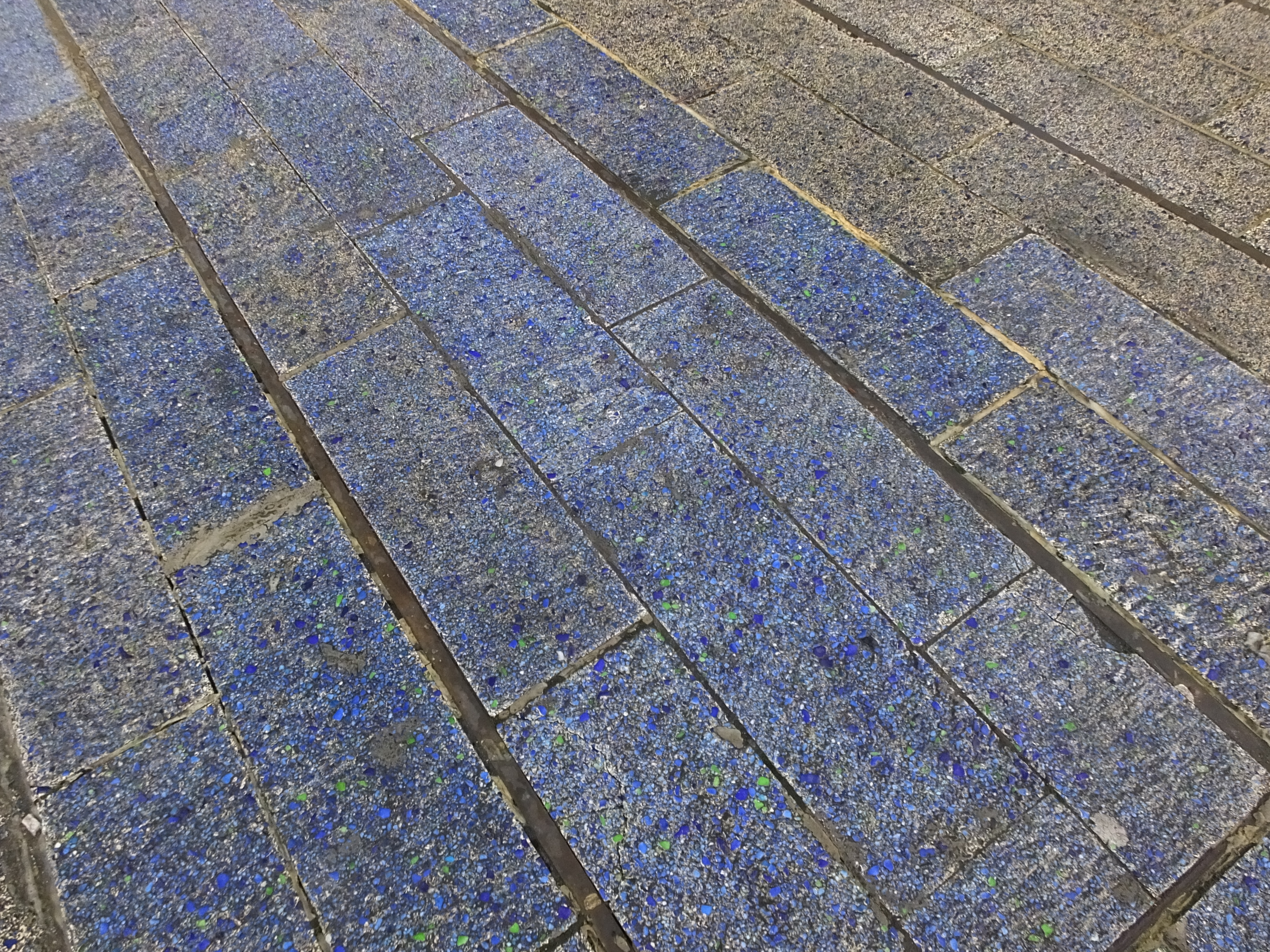
The tiles have rapidly faded to a blue-grey colour, a fact that is made more obvious when damaged tiles are replaced with those of the original colour.

The Blue Carpet has become the subject of some local debate, as parts of it are used as ramps by skateboarders. The tiles have also rapidly faded to a blue-grey colour, a fact that is made more obvious when damaged tiles are replaced with those of the original colour. The upturned benches have also become a regular target for vandals and are often fenced off while awaiting repair. The area was also damaged by an arson attack in 2001 which cost £10,000 to repair.

In 2011 Martin Callanan, a Conservative MEP, said that he did not consider the installation to be well thought out or cost effective, and suggested that it should be replaced by more conventional paving stones. Newcastle City Council director of strategic housing Harvey Emms stated that there were no plans to scrap the piece, which is well maintained.
