= Hylas and the Water Nymphs =

Painting by Henrietta Rae

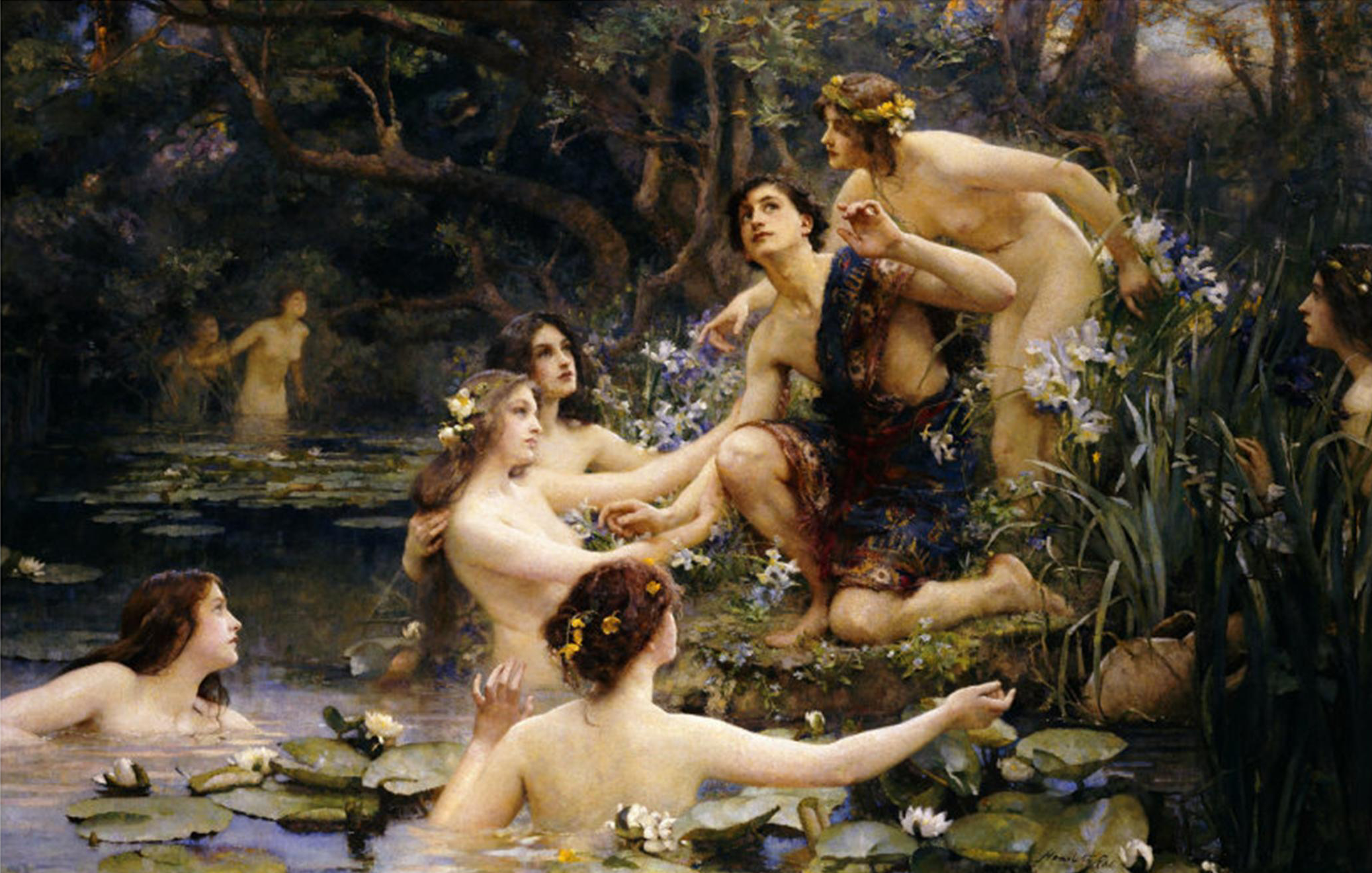
- Artist: Henrietta Rae
- Year: 1909
- Type: Oil on canvas, history painting
- Dimensions: 142.3 cm × 222.8 cm (56.0 in × 87.7 in)
- Location: Private collection

Hylas and the Water Nymphs is a 1909 history painting by the British artist Henrietta Rae. It depicts Hylas, a figure from Greek and Roman Mythology, being rescued by water nymphs. Stylistically it echoes Hylas and the Nymphs by John William Waterhouse of 1896.

It was displayed at the Royal Academy's Summer Exhibition of 1910 in London. It was sold at Christie's for £575,000 in 2000.

== Bibliography ==
- Devereux, Joanna (2016). The Making of Women Artists in Victorian England: The Education and Careers of Six Professionals. McFarland.
- Ricks, David (2014). Trapp, Michael (ed.). Dialogos: Hellenic Studies Review. Vol. 7. Taylor & Francis.
