= The Women (painting) =

Painting by John Charlton

- Artist: John Charlton
- Year: 1910
- Type: Oil on canvas, genre painting
- Dimensions: 152.2 cm × 244.4 cm (59.9 in × 96.2 in)
- Location: Laing Art Gallery, Newcastle

The Women is a 1910 oil painting by the British artist John Charlton. It depicts a group of fisherwoman hauling a lifeboat to launch it into the sea during a storm. It is inspired by the real-life incident on New Year's Day 1861 at Cullercoats in Northumberland when the collier brig Lovely Nelly was shipwrecked off Whitley Bay. When the storm blocked the harbour the villagers hauled the lifeboat three miles along the coast.

The painting was displayed at the Royal Academy Exhibition of 1910 held at Burlington House in London. It is now part of the collection of the Laing Art Gallery in Newcastle which acquired it in 1917 when it was bequeathed by the painter.

== Bibliography ==
- Hall, Valerie G. Women at Work, 1860-1939: How Different Industries Shaped Women's Experiences. Boydell Press, 2013.
- Knipe, Tony (ed.) Winslow Homer: All the Cullercoats Pictures. Northern Centre for Contemporary Art, 1988.
