= The Campaigns of Robert E. Lee =

1988 American Civil War board game

The Campaigns of Robert E. Lee is a board game published in 1988 by Clash of Arms Games (CoA) that simulates battles in the Eastern theater of the American Civil War.

== Description ==
The Campaigns of Robert E. Lee is a two-player wargame in which one player controls Union forces and the other controls Confederate forces.

Each turn starts with the player bidding on how many operations effort points they wish to use. The higher bidder takes their turn first. The player uses operation effort points to move and attack. Then the other player has the same opportunity. Play switches back and forth between the players until operation effort points have all been expended. This completes one game turn, which represents five days.

Leaders form an important part of the game, enabling units to move and attack more efficiently.

=== Scenarios ===
There are ten scenarios included in the game that run from the Battle of Manassas in 1861 to the final Battle of Appomattox Court House.

== Publication history ==
The Campaigns of Robert E. Lee was created by John Prados, with artwork by Rick Barber and Kim Gromoll, and was published by CoA in 1988. CoA published a second edition in 1990. The German publisher AGEMA released a German language edition, Die Feldzüge von Robert E. Lee, in 1991.

== Reception ==
In Issue 4 of the British magazine Games International, Mike Siggins admired the components, saying, "Clash of Arms games are expensive, and one of the reasons for this is the high quality of their components. [...] The thick paper maps are quite beautifully presented and are very possibly the best I've seen for this scale of game." With regards to the rules, Siggins found that "While the rules aren't exactly a model of clarity, especially the first few pages, they are quite well written overall and there are a fair number of examples. Given a couple of readings, it seems quite clear what is meant to happen but I feel it could have been better." Overall, Siggins called the game mechanics "clean, smooth and very playable and all the more interesting for the small details." Siggins concluded by giving the game a rating of 4 stars out of 5, commenting, "There is not a great deal new or revolutionary in The Campaigns of Robert E Lee, but what is there works extremely well."

== Awards ==
- 1988 Charles S. Roberts Awards
  - Winner, "Best Wargaming Graphics"
  - Finalist, "Best Pre-World War II Board Game"

== Other recognition ==
A copy of The Campaigns of Robert E. Lee is held in the collection of the Strong National Museum of Play.
