= La Bataille d'Auerstædt =

1977 Napoleonic board wargame

Boxed edition, 1984

La Bataille d'Auerstædt is a Napoleonic board wargame published by Marshal Enterprises in 1977 that simulates the Battle of Auerstadt in October 1806. Critics found the rules badly written, and the production values amateurish.

== Background ==
On 14 October 1806, while French forces under Napoleon I were fighting a Prussian force at the Battle of Jena, another part of the French army under Louis-Nicolas Davout was advancing to aid Napoleon when it encountered the main part of the Prussian army near the town of Auerstedt. Although the French were outnumbered by the Prussians, they displayed superior tactical skills.

== Description ==
La Bataille d'Auerstædt is a two-player board wargame in which one player controls the French forces and the other the Prussian forces. The game uses the same rules system as the previously published La Bataille de la Moscowa. With 400 counters, a large map and almost twenty pages of rules, critic Jon Freeman rated this game 8 out of 10 on a scale of complexity.

=== Gameplay ===
Information on the front of the counters only includes the unit's name and its movement factor. Other combat related information is printed on the back of the counter. This introduces a "fog of war" to the battle, where the opposing player does not have full intelligence on the opposing forces until engaging them in battle.

The game uses an alternating "I Go, You Go" system, although with opportunities for the non-phasing player to act during the phasing player's turn. The French player is the first to be the phasing player:

- Phasing Player:
  - Charge
  - Movement
- Non-phasing player:
  - Defensive fire
- Phasing player:
  - Offensive fire
  - Melee
- Both players: Morale check

The Prussian player then becomes the phasing player. This completes one game turn, which represents 20 minutes of the battle.

== Victory conditions ==
To win, the French player must capture the King or Queen of Prussia, or eliminate two-thirds of the Prussian army, or attain certain geographical objectives. The Prussian player wins by preventing all of these.

== Publication history ==
In 1975, Marshall Enterprises (originally Martial Enterprises) published the huge and complex Napoleonic board wargame La Bataille de la Moscowa. Two years later, Marshal published La Bataille d'Auerstaedt, designed by Monte Mattson, Ed Wimble and Dennis A. Spors and released in a ziplock bag. The game used the same rules set as its predecessor, but written in what critic Jon Freeman characterized as "cutesy, fractured Franglais that brings Inspector Clouseau to mind." The result was a set of rules that was difficult to parse, making the complex game even harder to understand. Marshal went on to publish an entire line of Napoleonic games under the "La Bataille" title.

In 1984, Marshal Enterprises revised the rules and released a second edition of this game as a boxed set.

In the mid-1980s, Clash of Arms bought the rights to the entire "La Bataille" series; after Ed Wimble revised the rules, La Bataille d'Auerstædt was re-released in 1991.

== Reception ==
In Issue 38 of the British wargaming magazine Perfidious Albion, Ken Broadburgh liked the quality of the game counters, but observed, "Unfortunately they suffer from a singular defect: both French and Prussian units are coloured blue and white! Even in my most generous moments I cannot understand such a basic error of judgment." Broadburgh also had issue with the rules, finding "gaps big enough to accommodate a coach and four!" But Broadburgh saved his harshest criticism for the over-wrought writing, saying, "The pomposity, blatant Francophilia and constant banality of the rules book leaves one aghast." Despite all these problems, Broadburgh admitted that the game "was very enjoyable to play and has clearly been tested thoroughly." He concluded, "All in all Auerstadt is a Jekyll and Hyde game. The presentation is quite exasperating at times but the game is well worthwhile. On balance I would recommend the game to you."

In the 1980 book The Complete Book of Wargames, game designer Jon Freeman called this "a strange game." He noted that the counters, although colorful, were difficult to read. He found the rules "should make sense, but they don't. When they do, they can be remarkably dumb." However, Freeman felt that "the feel for Napoleonics is rather good." Nevertheless, Freeman gave this game an Overall Evaluation of "Poor", concluding, "a magnificent production job is marred by a poorly developed and badly explained system."

In Issue 53 of Moves, Ian Chadwick called the game components "somewhat amateurish; the maps look like a high school geography project and the counters are so multi-coloured and detailed as to be almost unreadable." Chadwick also wondered how the battle of Auerstaedt could be simulated properly without also simulating the battle of Jena taking place at the same time only a few miles away. Chadwick concluded by giving the game grades of B− for playability, B for historical accuracy and C for component quality, saying, "This is a good system marred by the heavy hands of amateur over-design. What has the potential to be a superb series falls short of the attempt."

== Reviews ==
- Fire & Movement #75
