= Albanian Olive Gatherers =

Painting by John Singer Sargent

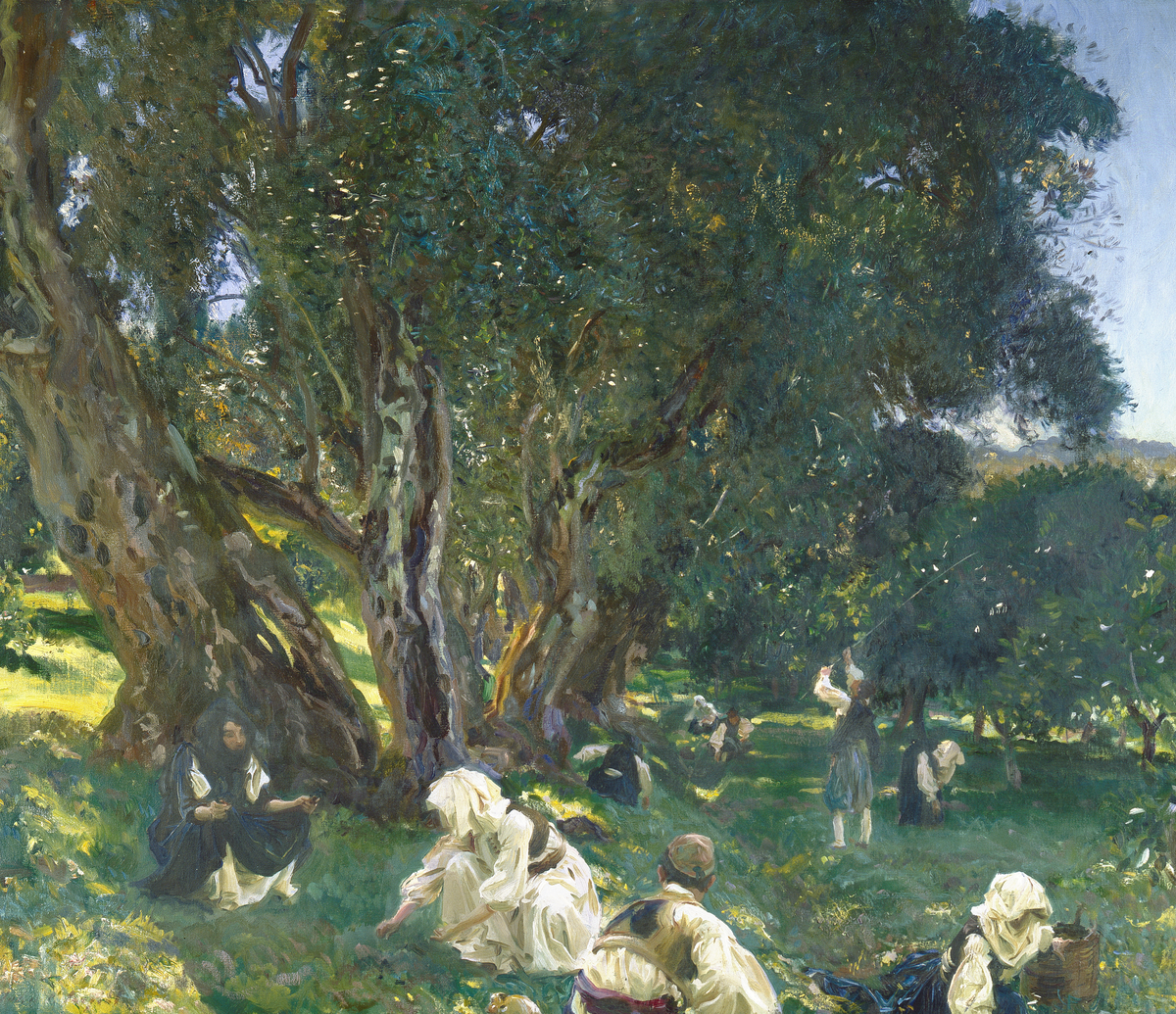
- Artist: John Singer Sargent
- Year: 1909
- Type: Oil on canvas, genre painting
- Dimensions: 96 cm × 115.1 cm (38 in × 45.3 in)
- Location: Manchester Art Gallery, Manchester

Albanian Olive Gatherers is a 1909 oil painting by the Anglo-American artist John Singer Sargent. It depicts a scene on the Greek island of Corfu where Albanians workers are shown harvesting the olive crop.

Singer Sargent had established in Britian himself as the leading portrait painter during the late Victorian era, known for his glamorous depictions of the elite. Works like this marked a return to the strongly Impressionist style he had developed during his early years in Paris. He increasingly used his holidays as a break from portraiture to focus on landscapes.

The painting was displayed at the Royal Academy Exhibition of 1910 at Burlington House in London. The same year it was presented to Manchester Art Gallery by Arthur Schuster.

== See also ==
- List of works by John Singer Sargent

== Bibliography ==
- Hills, Patricia (ed.) John Singer Sargent. Whitney Museum of American Art, 1986.
