= La Bataille de la Moscowa =

Board game

La Bataille de la Moscowa is a large board wargame that simulates the Battle of Borodino. It was originally published by Martial Enterprises in 1975, later republished by Game Designers Workshop in 1977, and then by Clash of Arms in 2011.

== Background ==
During the French invasion of Russia in 1812, after Napoleon defeated the Russian Imperial Army at the Battle of Smolensk, the Russians made a stand on the outskirts of Moscow near the village of Borodino. On 7 September 1812, a quarter million French and Russian soldiers met and clashed, resulting in the bloodiest single day of the Napoleonic Wars.

== Gameplay ==
The cover of the GDW boxed set, 1977

La Bataille de la Moscowa is a "monster" board wargame (a wargame with more than 1000 counters) for two players or, as suggested by several critics, two teams that simulates the Battle of Borodino.

The game was the first to introduce the concept of "limited intelligence": Only unit identification and movement allowance are printed on the face-up side of each counter, while all other combat information is printed on the reverse. Thus an opponent only has a vague idea of the capabilities of a unit when it first is placed on the map. It is only when the unit is engaged in combat that it is flipped over to reveal its true strength (or weakness).

=== Components ===
- 22-page rulebook (16 pages of scenarios)
- 1440 counters
- four 28" x 22" paper hex grid maps scaled at 100 m (109 yd) per hex

== Development and publication history ==
La Bataille de la Moscowa was originally designed by Laurence A. Groves and published by Martial Enterprises in 1975. (The company changed its name to Marshall Enterprises shortly after the game was published.) The game was originally released as a "baggy game" (everything enclosed in a plastic bag rather than a box), and included six short scenarios and a grand battle game.

Scaled to the regimental/battalion level — each hex is 100 metres, and each turn is 20 minutes of game time — the game utilizes four maps and 1400 counters representing various military units, making it one of the biggest and most complex wargames published at the time. Each stacking point is 100-150 men, 60-70 horses or 1-3 guns. Units may be placed in march order (ie. columns) in which they can use roads, subject to a one battalion stacking limit, but are weak in defence and may not attack. A regiment concentrated for combat will have weaker firepower than if its battalions are deployed separately, but will be stronger in morale and in melee combat. Leaders are used to rally units and confer a combat bonus. Artillery can break up enemy attacks at medium range and is deadly at short range. Cavalry is divided into lancers, dragoons and Russian Cossacks, while the French Old Guard can terrify its opponents if it charges. There are no rules for command control or ammunition supply but the game does have rules for multi-player games, covering the sending of messages, insubordination and "death" of players. Nick Palmer wrote that the scenario for the Shevardino Redoubt [a Russian fortified position captured two days before the main battle] gives good picture of the game, whereas the scenarios for the Raevski Redoubt [a Russian fortified position during the main battle] are shorter than the main game but more limited.

In the essay "A Game Out of All Proportion", Jon Peterson commented that "The market's sweet tooth for fantasy in the 1970s did not spoil its appetite for historical simulation entirely. Traditional wargames in this period grew in both depth and breadth, though not simultaneously in the same product. The small unit actions depicted by Tactical Game 3 inspired a number of narrow-scale successors [...] Simultaneously, other titles tried to capture the campaign-level activities of major battle theatres [...] there followed many of these so-called "monster games," such as the 1,400-counter juggernaut of Marshall Enterprises, La Bataille de la Moscowa (1975) [...] These games tested the limits of what could practically be modelled on a physical apparatus."

In 1977, GDW bought the rights to the game and republished it as a boxed set with upgraded components and minor rules revisions.

Marshall Enterprises continued to produce games in the "Bataille" series:

- La Bataille d'Auerstædt (1977)
- La Bataille de Pruessisch-Eylau (1978)
- La Bataille d'Espagnol: Talavera (1979)
- La Bataille de Austerlitz (1980)
- La Bataille de Deutsch-Wagram

In 1984, Clash of Arms bought the rights to the entire series; they re-released Bataille de la Moscowa (3rd Edition) in 2011.

== Reception ==
In a 1976 poll undertaken by wargame publisher SPI to determine the most popular board wargame, La Bataille de la Moscowa was voted the best amateur game, and was the second-most popular game.

In his 1977 book The Comprehensive Guide to Board Wargaming, Nicholas Palmer called this game "quite out of the ordinary." He noted the "detailed rules with an emphasis on tactical accuracy," but warned that games were "very long indeed (40 hours plus.)" He concluded by characterizing the game as "satisfying" but "very complex." In his 1980 sequel, The Best of Board Wargaming, Palmer called the second edition "one of the most beautiful sights in wargaming: four maps in four colours, six counter sheets in five more colours [...] and two full colour, order-of-battle sheets." He concluded, "most players mad enough to want all the detail of the game will probably also be mad enough to play the full battle game sooner or later, and certainly this offers maximum scope for both strategy and tactical ingenuity."

In Issue 27 of the British wargaming magazine Perfidious Albion, Peter McCarthy noted "The rules come in a small booklet and are quite easy to understand, they leave surprisingly little out ... So, the game is basically simple, but the full game scenario should not be attempted by two people, only as a multi-player, at least three French and two Russians." McCarthy noted, "All of this makes for an entertaining and enjoyable game, though lengthy ... Overall, a superb game, my favourite biggie and one zillion times better than Wellington's Victory.

In Issue 15 of The Wargamer, Charles Vasey found the complexity of the game admirable, although he had minor disagreements with a few of the morale rules. Vasey also disagreed with some aspects of the makeup of the armies, complaining that the game makes Russian Jaeger units and Russian cavalry inferior to their French opponents when Vasey claimed history showed the opposite. Despite these problems, he recommended the game, saying, "it's colourful, it's big, it's exciting, it's full of flavour."

In Issue 53 of Moves, Ian Chadwick commented that "while not an overly complex game to learn, it does take a long time to play and it takes a while to familiarize players with the intricacies of the tactical game." He liked the unique "limited intelligence" rule, and also admired "a particular lack of rules constraints", noting that there were no restrictions on the mobility or attack capability of units. His two dislikes were too much white space on the maps, making them hard to look at during long games; and no rules about unit formations, despite a long tradition in Napoleonic wargames to define how units are presented. Despite these problems, he concluded by giving it a "B" for playability, an "A" for historical accuracy, and a "B" for component quality, saying, "a delight and a must in the collection of Napoleonic and tactical buffs."

In The Guide to Simulations/Games for Education and Training, Martin Campion called this "one of the best of the monster games." With regards to using it in the classroom, Campion wrote, "it allows the study of a major battle at close range. The availability of short scenarios and rules for groups is a boon for a teacher. The game is big, but the rules are not particularly hard."

In Issue 64 of the French games magazine Casus Belli, Xavier Blanchot reviewed the TSR edition and commented, "The game captures well the disorder which will quickly set in on each side, the improvised and opportunistic charges quickly prevailing over the order of the first hours: one will reread with interest the immortal passages which Tolstoy devotes to this carnage in uniform in War and Peace." Blanchot concluded, "Fans of the First Empire will find unique experiences here, with the added bonus of the thrill of engaging the 35,000 men of an Imperial Guard at its peak."

== Awards ==
At the 1976 Origins Awards, La Bataille de la Moscowa won the Charles S. Roberts Award for Best Amateur Game of 1975.

== Other reviews and commentary ==
- Games & Puzzles #62
- Panzerfaust and Campaign #71
