= Clash of Arms =

Wargame publisher

- Founded: 1985
- Founder: Ed Wimble
- Headquarters: United States
- Products: Wargames

Clash of Arms Games (CoA) is a creator and publisher of wargames, both board wargames and rulesets and scenarios for miniatures wargaming.

== Company history ==
Ed Wimble was originally interested in role-playing games, and founded Theater of the Mind (TOME) in order to publish adventures for Chaosium's horror role-playing game Call of Cthulhu. After playing the Napoleonic wargame La Bataille de la Moskowa by Marshall Enterprises, Wimble bought the rights to the La Bataille series in 1985 and formed a TOME subsidiary, Clash of Arms, in order to publish games.

Under CoA, the La Bataille series continued, but the company also published rulesets for miniature wargaming, notable Flint & Steel (battles in the age of muskets), Clash of Armor (20th century tank battles), and Command at Sea (naval combat during World War II.)

== Awards ==
- At the 1988 Charles S. Roberts Awards, The Campaigns of Robert E. Lee won in the category "Best Wargaming Graphics" and was a finalist in the category "Best Pre-World War II Board Game"
- At the 1997 Origins Awards, Flint & Steel won in the category "Best Historical Miniatures Rules"
- At the 1998 Charles S. Roberts Awards, Summer Storm was a finalist in the category "Best Pre-World War II Boardgame"
- At the 2004 Origins Awards, The Dawn of the Rising Sun won in the category " Best Historical Miniatures Rules".
- At the Charles S. Roberts Awards in 2011, Ed Wimble was inducted into the Clausewitz Award Hall of Fame.

== Notable publications ==
=== La Bataille series ===
- La Bataille d'Albuera: Espagnol (1987)
- La Bataille de Quatre Bras (1991)
- La Bataille de Ligny (1991)
- La Bataille de Mont Saint Jean (1993)
- La Bataille de Wavre (1994)
- La Bataille de Corunna-Espagnol (1995)
- La Bataille de Lützen (1999)
- La Bataille d'Orthez (2000)
- La Bataille de Bailén (2013)
- La Bataille de Dresde (2015)

=== Command at Sea series ===
- The Rising Sun (1994)
- Supermarina I (1995)
- No Sailor But a Fool (1997)
- Supermarina II (1997)
- Mighty Midgets (2003)
- Baltic Arena (2005)
- Atlantic Navies (2008)
- American Fleets (2011)
- Emperor's Fleet (2011)
- Steel Typhoon (2012)
- Mediterranean Fleets (2013)

=== Clash of Armor series ===
- From Golan to Sinai: The Arab-Israeli Wars 1956-1973 (1994)
- PanzerKämpfe (1994)
- Rommel's Battles (1996)

=== Miscellaneous board wargames ===
- The Emperor Returns (1986)
- The Campaigns of Robert E. Lee (1988)
- The King's War (1989)
- Achtung: Spitfire! (1995)
- Summer Storm: The Battle of Gettysburg (1998)
