= James Prinsep Beadle =

English painter (1863–1947)

James Prinsep Beadle (22 September 1863 – 13 August 1947) was an English painter of historical and military scenes.

== Early life ==
Born in Calcutta on 22 September 1863, his father was Major-General James Pattle Beadle. For three years, he studied with Legros at the Slade School in London and at the Ecole des Beaux Arts in Paris under Alexandre Cabanel; his final studies were back in London with G. F. Watts.

== Painting career ==
Beadle first exhibited at the Royal Academy (RA) in 1884 and also at the Paris Salon. Five years later, he was awarded a bronze medal at the Paris Exposition Universelle. Growing up in a military family, the artist was particularly attracted to military subjects and one of his earliest pieces depicted the inspection of the Duke of Yorks Own Loyal Suffolk Hussars at Bury St. Edmonds in 1893. From then on, he was a frequent exhibitor of 'battle' paintings at the RA, the New Gallery and elsewhere. In a review published in the Illustrated London News on 19 May 1894, Beadle's military pieces were singled-out for praise: "He does not go out of his way to flatter 'Tommy Atkins', but he shows him to the public under many forms and in many becoming uniforms. He has studied him at home and abroad, at peace and at war, on horseback and on foot..."

While many of his scenes represented contemporary events such as the Franco-Prussian War, the Boer War and the First World War, Beadle found the subject of the Peninsular War, particularly interesting and visited Spain and Portugal in 1912 to sketch the battlefields.

As late as 1924, the artist was still paintings scenes from the Peninsular War, but the events of 1914-1918 were also occupying his mind, and several notable paintings were produced including Neuve Chapelle, 10 March 1915, Dawn: Waiting to go over, and Breaking the Hindenburg Line. In his final years, he lived in Kensington and died at his home on Eldon Road on 13 August 1947, leaving his widow, A.M.G. Beadle.

== Paintings ==
- George II knighting Trooper Brown (Queen's Royal Hussars)
- The Rearguard (Retreat to Corunna) (The Rifles)
- Sahagun, December 1808 (The Light Dragoons)
- Vitoria, 21 June 1813: The Village of Gamara Mayor carried by the 4th, 47th and 59th Regiments of General Robinson's Brigade (Nuneaton Art Gallery)
- St. Sebastian, August 1813 (Regimental Museum, King's Own Royal Regiment, Lancaster)
- Salamanca (Regimental Museum, King's Own Royal Regiment, Lancaster)
- The Passage of the Bidassoa by Wellington's Army, 7 October 1813 (1908 - Queen's Royal Hussars)
- Napoleon's last inspection at Waterloo
- "1815." The Captive Eagle. Corporal Styles of the Royal Dragoons, etc (1892 - Norfolk Museums Service)
- Saving the Guns at Maiwand (1893 - National Army Museum)
- The Victors of Paardeberg
- The Empty Saddle: South Africa, 1900 (Queen's Royal Lancers)
- Bergendal, South Africa: Charge of the 2nd Battalion Rifle Brigade (1914 - The Rifles)
- Battle of Gheluveldt, 31 October 1914 (1920 - Worcester Museum and Art Gallery)
- Dawn: Waiting to go over (Imperial War Museum)
- Neuve Chapelle, 10 March 1915: 2nd Rifle Brigade and 39th Garwal Rifles clearing the village (Maidstone Museum & Art Gallery)
- Battle of the Somme: Attack of the Ulster Division, 1 July 1916 (Belfast City Hall)
- Breaking the Hindenburg Line (Imperial War Museum)
- The Lost Patrol (East Riding Yeomanry in Palestine, 1917 (Queen's Own Yeomanry, York)
- The Action of the 6th Mounted Brigade (The Bucks, Berks and Dorset Yeomanry) at El Mughar (1922 - Crown Commissioners, Institute of Directors, Pall Mall)
- Charge of the Bucks, Berks, and Dorset Yeomanry at El Mughar, Palestine Campaign, 13 November 1917 (1936 - Staff College, Camberley)
