= 1981 Origins Award winners =

List of award winners

The following are the winners of the 8th annual (1981) Origins Award, presented at Origins 1982:

== Charles Roberts Awards ==
Category	Winner	Company	Designer(s)
Best Pre-20th Century Game of 1981	A House Divided	GDW	
Best 20th Century Game of 1981	Wings		
Best Science Fiction Boardgame of 1981	Car Wars	Steve Jackson Games	
Best Fantasy Boardgame of 1981	Barbarian Prince	Heritage Models	
Best Initial Release of a Boardgame of 1981	Iron Bottom Sound		
Best Professional Boardgaming Magazine of 1981	Fire & Movement	Baron Publishing	
Best Adventure Game for Home Computer of 1981	Eastern Front		
Best Amateur Adventure Gaming Magazine of 1981	Journal of WWII Wargaming		
Adventure Gaming Hall of Fame	Marc Miller		

== The H.G. Wells Awards ==
Category	Winner	Company	Designer(s)
Best Historical Figure Series of 1981	Condotierra	Ral Partha	
Best Fantasy or Science Fiction Figure Series of 1981	Dragonslayers & Travellers	Martian Metals	
Best Vehicular Model Series of 1981	Micro Armor	GHQ	
Best Miniatures Rules of 1981	Harpoon	Adventure Games Inc	
Best Roleplaying Rules of 1981	Call of Cthulhu	Chaosium	
Best Roleplaying Adventure of 1981	Thieves' World	Chaosium	
Best Professional Miniatures Magazine of 1981	The Courier		
Best Professional Roleplaying Magazine of 1981	Journal of the Travellers Aid Society	GDW	
All Time Best Miniatures Rules for 20th Century Land Battles of 1981	Tacforce		
All Time Best Miniatures Rules for Pre-20th Century Naval Battles of 1981	Ship o' the Line		
