= Mark H. Walker =

American wargame designer

http://www.markhwalker.com/

Mark H. Walker is a writer and board wargame designer. He has written articles about information technology and video games for publications including AutoWeek, PC Gamer, Computer Gaming World, Armchair General, and Playboy and websites such as GameSpy and Science Fiction Weekly.

== Background ==
Walker spent over 23 years in the U.S. Navy, (17 years active and 6 in the Naval Reserve) reaching the rank of Commander. He has a master's degree in Warfighting and International Relations from the Naval War College.

== Writing ==
Walker has written or co-authored dozens of computer-related books, including the official game guides for several computer games.

His first novel, A Craving for Blood (ISBN 1-60145-008-7), was published on October 2, 2006. He has since published two novels, World at War: Revelation and Everyone Dies in the End, as well as several short stories.

== Game designs ==
Walker designed an award-winning series of board wargames called Lock 'n Load. The games are squad-level wargames in which a counter can represent a squad, a vehicle or a person such as a sniper or a commanding officer. The first of these games, Lock 'n Load: Forgotten Heroes: Vietnam was published by Shrapnel Games in 2003. Lock 'n Load: ANZAC Attack, an expansion pack was released in 2004. Lock ’n Load: Band of Heroes, published in 2006 by Matrix Games, is set during World War II. Both Forgotten Heroes and Band of Heroes were voted best boardgame of the year by readers of The Wargamer.

Walker subsequently designed the award-winning Mark H. Walker's World at War. A platoon-level game system set in an alternate history in which NATO and Warsaw Pact fought a Third World War beginning in May 1985. The game system ties in with Walker's novel World at War: Revelation, which tells the tale of the darker side of the war, mixing military adventure with elements of horror and paranormal events.

In 2010 Walker, then the owner of Lock 'n Load Publishing, published a third tactical series with the release of Nations at War: White Star Rising, a platoon-level game set in Western Europe between 1944-45.

Walker also designed several smaller board wargames for free publication in Armchair General Magazine, although none of them were particularly challenging to hardcore gamers.

== Publishing companies ==
Lock 'n Load Publishing: From June 2006 until March 2013, Walker owned Lock 'n Load Publishing. Under his ownership the company released 61 products. After the company's sale, Walker remained with the firm as a designer until November 2014.

Flying Pig Games: In December 2014, Walker announced the founding of a new company, Flying Pig Games.
