= To the Green Fields Beyond =

To the Green Fields Beyond may refer to:

- To the Green Fields Beyond (play), 2000 play by Nick Whitby
- To the Green Fields Beyond (game), game by Simulations Productions
