= Charles S. Roberts Award =

Annual tabletop games award

The Charles S. Roberts Awards (or CSR Awards) is an annual award for excellence in manual, tabletop games, with a focus on "conflict simulations"; this includes simulations of military and non-military conflicts. From its founding in 1975 through 2021, the award was almost exclusively focused on historical wargaming. The Award changed to focus on broader "conflict simulations" starting in award year 2022 (calendar year 2023).

The Charles S. Roberts Awards were named in honor of Charles S. Roberts, the "Father of Wargaming", who founded Avalon Hill. The actual award is informally called a "Charlie", and formally/officially known as a "Charles S. Roberts Award". The Wargamer magazine calls it "very prestigious". It is a "people's award" with winners chosen through votes submitted by fans. The award itself is managed by the Charles S. Roberts Award Committee, which has no commercial sponsorship, and which is composed of designers, writers and hobbyists.

It is considered the most important award in the field of wargames.

== History ==
Created at the first Origins Game Convention in 1975, the awards were the brainchild of Canadian game store owner John Mansfield. Originally the awards were titled the "Origins Awards" but were informally known as the Charles Roberts Awards and it was only in 1988 that Charles Roberts officially agreed to let his name be used. The split from the Origins Awards occurred in 1987, after Fortress America by Milton Bradley Company won an award. Fortress America was not considered a traditional historical wargame by members of the wargaming community, with mechanics and a target audience more akin to Risk; and there was concern that because of the large print run of a Milton Bradley product, many of the voters came from outside the traditional wargaming hobby flooding out smaller run titles.

Prior to 2000, the awards were given at the Origins Game Fair. From 2000–2012, the awards were presented at the World Boardgaming Championships (formerly "AvalonCon"). The awards were not given from 2013–2018.

In 2020, a group of gamers and industry figures restarted the award under auspices of Chairman Rodger B. MacGowan and directed and operated by Tim Tow. Like the original, it is a non-profit and not associated with commercial interests. There are an increased number of categories including art, print and play (called "amateur wargames"), and computer wargame categories.

== Recent award winners ==
=== 2003 ===
- Best Pre–World War II Boardgame—Age of Napoleon (Phalanx Games)
- Best World War II Boardgame—Europe Engulfed (GMT Games LLC)
- Best Modern Era Boardgame—Lock 'n Load (Shrapnel Games)
- Best Magazine-Published Boardgame—Ignorant Armies (Strategy & Tactics/Decision)
- Best DTP-Produced Boardgame—Thunder on South Mountain (Blue Guidon)
- Best Wargame Graphics—Ardennes '44 (GMT Games LLC)
- Best Professional Wargame Magazine—Against The Odds
- Best Amateur Wargame Magazine—Panzerschreck (Minden Games)
- Best Game Review or Game Analysis—Drive on Stalingrad, Paper Wars #50
- Best Historical or Scenario Article—"Napoleon at the Berezina", Against the Odds Vol.1 No.4
- James F. Dunnigan Award, To a Game Designer, Developer, Graphic Artist or Game for outstanding achievement – Rick Young and Jesse Evans, Europe Engulfed (GMT Games LLC)
- Clausewitz Award HALL OF FAME—Kevin Zucker

=== 2004 ===
- Best Pre–World War II Boardgame—Sword of Rome (GMT Games)
- Best World War II Boardgame—ASL Starter Kit #1 (Multi-Man Publishing)
- Best Modern Era Boardgame—Downtown (GMT Games)
- Best Magazine-Published Boardgame—Fortress Berlin (Against the Odds)
- Best DTP-Produced Boardgame—Louisiana Tigers (BSO Games)
- Best Wargame Graphics—Downtown (GMT Games)
- Best Professional Wargame Magazine—(tie) Against The Odds and Strategy & Tactics
- Best Amateur Wargame Magazine—Panzerschreck (Minden Games)
- Best Game Review or Game Analysis—no winner designated
- Best Historical or Scenario Article—S&T Sedan, by Ty Bomba
- Best Pre-20th Century PC Game—Rome: Total War (Total War Games)
- Best 20th Century+ PC Game—Battles in Normandy (Strategic Studies Group)
- James F. Dunnigan Award, To a Game Designer, Developer, Graphic Artist or Game for outstanding achievement—Lee Brimmicombe Wood for Downtown (GMT Games)
- Clausewitz Award HALL OF FAME—JD Webster

=== 2005 ===
- Best Pre–World War II Boardgame—Bonaparte at Marengo (Simmons Games)
- Best World War II Boardgame—Empire of the Sun (GMT Games LLC)
- Best Modern Era Boardgame—Twilight Struggle (GMT Games LLC)
- Best Magazine-Published Boardgame—Chennault's First Fight (Against The Odds #12)
- Best DTP-Produced Boardgame—Death in the Trenches (Schutze Games)
- Best Wargame Graphics—(tie) Empire of the Sun (GMT Games LLC) and Fire in the Sky (MMP/The Gamers)
- Best Professional Wargame Magazine—Against The Odds
- Best Amateur Wargame Magazine—Panzerschreck (Minden Games)
- Best Game Review or Game Analysis—Empire of the Sun Strategy Concepts (C3i #17)
- Best Historical or Scenario Article—not awarded
- Best Pre-20th Century PC Game—Crown of Glory (Matrix Games)
- Best 20th Century+ PC Game—not awarded
- James F. Dunnigan Award, To a Game Designer, Developer, Graphic Artist or Game for outstanding achievement—Ananda Gupta and Jason Matthews, Twilight Struggle (GMT Games LLC)
- Clausewitz Award HALL OF FAME—none

=== 2006 ===
- Best Pre–World War II Boardgame—Here I Stand (GMT Games LLC)
- Best World War II Boardgame—A Victory Lost (Multi-Man Publishing)
- Best Modern Era Boardgame—Winged Horse: Campaigns in Vietnam, 1965–66 (S&T #239)
- Best DTP-Produced Boardgame—Battle of the Little Bighorn (Khyber Pass Games)
- Best Magazine-Published Boardgame—Golden Horde: Kulikovo 1380 (Against the Odds #18)
- Best Wargame Graphics—A Victory Lost (Multi-Man Publishing)
- Best Professional Wargame Magazine—Against The Odds
- Best Amateur Wargame Magazine—Line of Departure (Jim Werbaneth)
- James F. Dunnigan Award, To a Game Designer, Developer, Graphic Artist or Game for outstanding achievement—Tetsuya Nakamura, A Victory Lost (Multi-Man Publishing)
- Clausewitz Award HALL OF FAME—none

=== 2007 ===
- Best Pre–World War II Boardgame—1914: Twilight in the East (GMT Games LLC)
- Best World War II Boardgame—Case Blue (MMP/The Gamers)
- Best Modern Era Boardgame—World at War: Eisenbach Gap (Lock 'n Load Publishing)
- Best DTP-Produced Boardgame—Rosebud: Prelude to Little Bighorn (Khyber Pass Games)
- Best Magazine-Published Boardgame—Not War But Murder (Against the Odds #19)
- Best Wargame Graphics (tie)—1914: Twilight in the East (GMT Games LLC) and Overlord: D-Day and the Beachhead Battles (New England Simulations)
- Best Professional Wargame Magazine—Against The Odds
- Best Amateur Wargame Magazine—Line of Departure (Jim Werbaneth)
- Best Game Review or Game Analysis—Against the Odds #19: "The Evolution of Cards and Wargames", by John Prados
- Best Historical or Scenario Article—Against the Odds #19, "Not War But Murder: The Cold Harbor Campaign – 1864", by Michael Rinella
- James F. Dunnigan Award, To a Game Designer, Developer, Graphic Artist or Game for outstanding achievement—Dean Essig, Designer, Case Blue and OCS series (MMP/The Gamers)
- Best Pre-20th Century Era Computer Wargame—Empires in Arms (Matrix Games)
- Best 20th Century Era Computer Wargame—Guns of August 1914–1918 (Matrix Games)
- Clausewitz Award HALL OF FAME—none

=== 2008 ===
- Best Pre–World War II Boardgame—Warriors of God (Multi Man Publications, Inc.)
- Best World War II Boardgame—Conflict of Heroes (Academy Games)
- Best Modern Era Boardgame—Red Dragon Rising: The Coming War with China (Decision Games)
- Best DTP-Produced Boardgame—June '44 (DDH Games)
- Best Magazine-Published Boardgame—Iwo Jima: Rage Against the Marines (Operations, MMP)
- Best Wargame Graphics—Conflict of Heroes (Academy Games)
- Best Professional Wargame Magazine—C3i Magazine (RBM Publication)
- Best Amateur Wargame Magazine—Line of Departure (Jim Werbaneth)
- Best Game Review or Game Analysis (tie)—Empire of the Sun: Opening Strategy, by Mark Herman (C3i Magazine) and Top 20 Games – A Look Back by Steve Carey (C3i Magazine)
- Best Historical or Scenario Article (tie)—Combat Commander: Variant Rules by Chad Jensen and John Foley (C3i Magazine) and Flying Colors: Trafalgar Campaign by Mark Barker (C3i Magazine)
- James F. Dunnigan Award, To a Game Designer, Developer, Graphic Artist or Game for outstanding achievement—Uwe Eickert
- Best Pre-20th Century Era Computer Wargame—none
- Best 20th Century Era Computer Wargame—none
- Clausewitz Award HALL OF FAME—none

=== 2009 ===
- Best Ancient to Napoleonic Era Board Wargame – A Most Dangerous Time: Japan in Chaos, 1570–1584, Multi Man Publications, Inc.
- Best Post-Napoleonic to Pre–World War II Era Board Wargame – Battle Above the Clouds, Multi Man Publications, Inc.
- Best World War II Era Board Wargame – D-Day at Omaha Beach, Decision Games
- Best Post-WW2 Era Board Wargame – Elusive Victory, GMT Games
- Best Pre-20th Century Era Computer Wargame – Field of Glory, Slitherine
- Best 20th Century Era – Modern Computer Wargame – War in the Pacific – Admiral's Edition, Matrix Games
- Best Science-Fiction or Fantasy Board Wargame – Struggle for the Galactic Empire, Decision Games
- Best Magazine Game – Deathride: Mars-la-Tour 1870, Against the Odds magazine (ATO)
- Best Desktop Published (DTP)/Print-and-Play Game – Zulus on the Ramparts!, Victory Point Games
- Best Expansion or Supplement for an Existing Game – Panzerblitz Hill of Death mini-module Carentan, Multi Man Publications, Inc.
- Best Board Game Graphics – Battle Above the Clouds, Multi Man Publications, Inc.
- Best Professional Game Magazine – Battles magazine (by Olivier Revenu)
- Best Amateur Game Magazine – Panzer Digest (by Gary Graber), Minden Games
- Best Historical/Scenario Article – For the People – 10th Anniversary Variant Rules (C3i #23) by Mark Herman
- Best Game Review or Analysis Article – Liberty Roads (Battles Magazine 2)
- James F. Dunnigan Design Elegance Award – John Butterfield
- Clausewitz Award HALL OF FAME – John Butterfield

=== 2010 ===
- Best Ancient to Napoleonic Era Board Wargame – Washington's War (by Mark Herman), GMT Games
- Best Post-Napoleonic to Pre-World War 2 Era Board Wargame – The Spanish Civil War 1936–1939 (by Javier Romero), GMT Games
- Best World War 2 Era Board Wargame – Normandy '44 (by Mark Simonitch), GMT Games
- Best Post-WW2 Era Board Wargame – Labyrinth: The War on Terror (by Volko Ruhnke), GMT Games
- Best Pre-20th Century Era Computer Wargame – Civilization V
- Best 20th Century Era – Modern Computer Wargame – Gary Grigsby's War in the East: The German-Soviet War 1941–1945 (2by3 Games/ Matrix)
- Best Science-Fiction or Fantasy Board Wargame – War of the Ring Collector's Edition (by Roberto di Meglio, Marco Maggi, Francesco Nepitello), Fantasy Flight Games
- Best Science-Fiction or Fantasy Computer Wargame – Mass Effect 2
- Best Magazine Game – A Week in Hell (by Laurent Guenette), Battles magazine
- Best Desktop Published (DTP)/Print-and-Play/Postcard Game – We Must Tell the Emperor (by Steve Carey), Victory Point Games
- Best Expansion or Supplement for an Existing Game – Combat Commander: Battle Pack #3 – Normandy (by John Foley), GMT Games
- Best Board Game Graphics – Normandy '44 (GMT)
- Best Computer Game Graphics – Gary Grigsby's War in the East: The German-Soviet War 1941–1945 (2by3 Games/ Matrix)
- Best Professional Game Magazine – Battles Magazine
- Best Amateur Game Magazine – Line of Departure
- Best Historical/Scenario Article – Joel Toppen, History of the Peloponnesian War (C3i #24)
- Best Game Review or Analysis Article – Mark Herman, Washington's War, Art of Asymmetrical Strategy (C3i#24)
- James F. Dunnigan Design Elegance Award – Labyrinth: The War on terror
- Clausewitz Award HALL OF FAME – Richard Borg

=== 2011 ===
- Best Ancient to Napoleonic Era Board Wargame – Sekigahara (by Matt Calkins), GMT Games
- Best Post-Napoleonic to Pre-World War 2 Era Board Wargame – None But Heroes (by Dean Essig), Multi Man Publications, Inc. (MMP)
- Best Best World War 2 Era Board Wargame- No Retreat: The Russian Front Deluxe Edition (by Carl Paradis), GMT Games
- Best Post-WW2 Era Board Wargame – Lock 'n Load: Heroes of the Gap (by Pete Abrams, Mark H. Walker), Lock 'n Load Publishing
- Best Pre-20th Century Era Computer Wargame – Shogun 2 Total War
- Best 20th Century Era – Modern Computer Wargame – Combat Mission: Battle for Normandy
- Best Science-Fiction or Fantasy Board Wargame – Space Empires 4X (by Jim Krohn), GMT Games
- Best Science-Fiction or Fantasy Computer Wargame – Ravenmark: Scourge of Estellion
- Best Magazine Game – Into the Bastards! – First tank battle (by Nicolas Rident), Battles magazine
- Best Desktop Published (DTP)/Print-and-Play/Postcard Game – The Battle of Halle 1806 (by Dennis A. Spors, James Soto, Monte Mattson, Michael Neylan), LA Bataille ME Premier
- Best Expansion or Supplement for an Existing Game – Advanced Squad Leader: Starter Kit Expansion Pack #1 (by Ken Dunn), Multi Man Publications, Inc. (MMP)
- Best Board Game Graphics – Where The Eagles Dare MMP
- Best Computer Game Graphics – Shogun 2 Total War
- Best Professional Game Magazine – Battles Magazine
- Best Amateur Game Magazine – Line of Departure
- Best Historical/Scenario Article – To Script or Not to Script, that is the question? (Mark Herman C3i #25
- Best Game Review or Analysis Article – Labyrinth, David Hughes
- James F. Dunnigan Design Elegance Award – Adam Starkweather
- Clausewitz Award HALL OF FAME – Ed Wimble

=== 2012 ===
- Best Ancient to Napoleonic Era Board Wargame: The Battle of Fontenoy (by Mathew Hinkle), Clash of Arms Games
- Best Post-Napoleonic to Pre-World War 2 Era Board Wargame: Bloody April (by Terry Simo), GMT Games
- Best World War 2 Era Board Wargame: Red Winter (by Mark Mokszycki), GMT Games
- Best Post-WW2 Era Board Wargame: Andean Abyss (by Volko Ruhnke), GMT Games
- Best Pre-20th Century Era Computer Wargame: Levee en Masse (by John Welch), Victory Point Games
- Best 20th Century Era – Modern Computer Wargame: Battle of the Bulge, Shenandoah Studios
- Best Science-Fiction or Fantasy Board Wargame: Star Wars: X-Wing Miniatures Game (by Jeffrey Kniffen), Fantasy Flight Games
- Best Science-Fiction or Fantasy Computer Wargame: X-Com: Enemy Unknown, Firaxis 2K Games
- Best Magazine Game: Beyond Waterloo (by John Prados), Against the Odds magazine (ATO)
- Best Desktop Published (DTP) / Print-and-Play / Postcard Game: City of Confusion: The Battle for Hue, Tet 1968 (by Paul Rohrbaugh), High Flying Dice Games
- Best Expansion or Supplement for an Existing Game: Festung Budapest (by Bill Cirillo), Multi Man Publications, Inc. (MMP)
- Best Board Game Graphics: The Battle of Fontenoy (by Charles Kibler), Clash of Arms Games
- Best Computer Game Graphics: Battle of the Bulge, Shenandoah Studios
- Best Professional Game Magazine: C3i, RBM Publications
- Best Amateur Game Magazine: 1914 Dispatches, Oregon Consim Games
- Best Historical/Scenario Article: 1914 – A postwar Solution for Austria-Hungary's Mobilization (Michael Resch C3i nr 26)
- Best Game Review or Analysis Article: For the People – Defending the Union (by Dave Dockter and Mark Herman), C3i Magazine
- James F. Dunnigan Design Elegance Award: Dean Essig
- Clausewitz Award HALL OF FAME: Brian Youse

=== 2019 ===
- Best Ancients to Pre-Napoleonic War Game: Nevsky: Teutons and Rus in Collision
- Best Napoleonic Era War Game: Quatre Bras 1815
- Best Post-Napoleonic Pre-WWII War Game: Death Valley: Battles of Shenandoah
- Best WW2 Era War Game: U-BOOT The Board Game
- Best Amateur/Print-n-Play War Game: Federation Stellar Force
- Best Game Review or Analysis: The Players Aid
- Best Modern Era Computer War Game: Command: Modern Operations
- Best Sci-Fi/Fantasy Computer War Game: Stellaris
- Best Computer War Game Expansion or Update: Through the Ages: New Leaders and Wonders
- Best Computer War Game Graphics: Unity of Command II
- Best Pre-20th Century Computer War Game: Julius Caesar
- Best Amateur War Gaming Magazine: War Diary
- Best Magazine Board War Game: Campaigns of 1777 (Strategy and Tactics magazine)
- Best Postcard/Small Format Board War Game: Imua! The Unification of Hawaii, 1795
- Best Professional War Game Magazine: C3i
- Science Fiction or Fantasy War Game: Dune
- Best Solitaire/Co-Operative War Game: UBOOT The Board Game
- Best War Game Playing Components: UBOOT The Board Game
- Best War Game Rules: UBOOT The Board Game
- Best War Game Map Graphics: UBOOT The Board Game
- Best Computer Assist Module: UBOOT The Board Game
- Best Original Box Cover Art: UBOOT The Board Game
- Best Expansion or Supplement: Time of Crisis: Age of Iron and Rust
- Best Post-WW2, Cold War, and Hypothetical Era: Storming the Gap: World at War '85
- Best Game Review or Analysis Article: (tie) Evolution of Historical Small Unit Tactic Board Wargames by Robert Carroll and OCS 101 Vitebsk Introductory Scenario by Chip Saltsman
- Clausewitz Award HALL OF FAME: Rich Banner
- James F. Dunnigan Award for Design and Playability: Volke Ruhnke
- War Boardgame of the Year: UBOOT The Board Game

=== 2020 ===
- Ancients to Medieval Board Wargame Caesar: Rome vs. Gaul GMT
- Early Gunpowder Board Wargame Imperial Struggle GMT
- Napoleonic Era Board Wargame The Shores of Tripoli Fort Circle Games
- Late GunPowder Era Board Wargames Freedom! Phalanx
- American Civil War (ACW) Board Wargames Chancellorsville 1863 Worthington
- WWI Board Wargames Verdun 1916: Steel Inferno Fellowship of Simulations
- WW2 Board Wargames The Jaws of Victory: Battle of Korsun-Cherkassy Pocket – January/February 1944 New England Simulations
- Modern, Hypothetical Board Wargame Brotherhood & Unity: War in Bosnia and Herzegovina 1992-1995 Compass
- SciFi Fantasy Board Stellar Horizons Compass
- SF Fantasy Computer Wargame Shadow Empire Matrix Games and Root Dire Wolf
- Pre-20th Century Computer Wargame Crusader Kings III Paradox Interactive and Field of Glory II: Medieval Slitherine
- Modern Era Computer Wargame Panzer Corps 2
- Computer Wargame Expansion Field of Glory Empires – Persia 550 – 330 BCE Slitherine Ltd and Order of Battle: Red Storm Slitherine
- Computer Wargame Graphics Panzer Corps 2
- Board Game Assist Module Dune (Treachery Online)
- Solitaire/Coop Board Wargame The Shores of Tripoli Fort Circle Games
- Magazine Board Wargame Battle for Kursk: The Tigers Are Burning, 1943 C3i #34
- Amateur/Print & Play Wargame Kettle Hill
- Postcard/Small Format Board Wargame Lucky Little Luxembourg
- Best Board Wargame Expansion Labyrinth: The Forever War, 2015-?
- Board Wargame Playing Components The Jaws of Victory: Battle of Korsun-Cherkassy Pocket – January/February 1944 New England Simulations
- Board Wargame Map Graphics Imperial Struggle GMT
- Wargame Rules The Jaws of Victory: Battle of Korsun-Cherkassy Pocket – January/February 1944 New England Simulations and The Shores of Tripoli Fort Circle Games
- Original Box Cover Art The Shores of Tripoli Fort Circle Games
- Amateur Wargame Magazine Punched
- Professional Wargame Magazine C3I
- Wargame Analysis / Game Review / Analysis website, webcast, podcast The Player's Aid
- Individual Historical Article or Scenario Analysis Wargaming in the Department of Defense — U.S. Army Command and General Staff College Common Core: Wargaming in the Joint Planning Process* – Eric Walters
- Military History Book Twilight of the Gods: War in the Western Pacific 1944-1945 by Ian Toll
- Wargame of the Year Verdun 1916: Steel Inferno Fellowship of Simulations
- Dunnigan Award for Design Excellence Verdun 1916: Steel Inferno Walter Vejdovsky
- Clausewitz Hall of Fame recipient Walter Vejdovsky

=== 2021 ===
- Best Ancients to Medieval Era Board Wargame: Rome, Inc., Against the Odds, designer Philip Jelley
- Best Early Gunpowder Board Wargame 1453-1793 AD: Bayonets & Tomahawks, GMT Games, designer Marc Rodrigue
- Best Late Gunpowder to Pre-World War I Board Wargame, excluding American Civil War and Napoleonic Topics: Red Flag Over Paris, GMT Games, designer Fred Serval
- Best Napoleonic Board Wargame: Napoleon Invades Spain, Operational Studies Group, designer Kevin Zucker
- Best American Civil War Board Wargame: Hood Strikes North, Multi-Man Publishing, designers Joseph M. Balkoski, Ed Beach & Chris Withers
- Best World War I Era Board Wargame: Decisive Victory 1918: Soissons, Legion Wargames, designers Serge Bettencourt, Tim Gale
- Best World War II Era Board Wargame: Atlantic Chase, GMT Games, designer Jeremy White
- Best Modern Era Board Wargame: NATO: The Cold War Goes Hot, Compass Games, designer Bruce Maxwell
- Best Science-Fiction or Fantasy Board Wargame: Oath: Chronicles of Empire and Exile, Leder Games, designer Cole Wehrle
- Best Solitaire or Cooperative Board Wargame: Atlantic Chase, GMT Games, designer Jeremy White
- Best Magazine Board Wargame: Hannut: France 1940, Decision Games, designer Joe Youst
- Best Expansion or Supplement for an Existing Board Wargame: Undaunted: Reinforcements, Osprey Games, designers David Thompson & Trevor Benjamin
- Best Board Wargame Playing Components: Atlantic Chase, GMT Games
- Best Board Wargame Map Graphics: Bayonets & Tomahawks, GMT Games, map artist Marc Rodrigue
- Best Board Wargame Rules: Atlantic Chase, GMT Games, designer Jeremy White
- Best Cover Art: Storm Above the Reich, GMT Games, box artists Mark Simonitch & Antonis Karidis
- Best Computer Wargame: War in the East 2, Slitherine, Ltd.
- Best Wargame Magazine: C3i, RBM Studios
- Best Individual Historical, Scenario Analysis, or Book: Wayne Hansen, "Let's Play! Devil Boats: PT Boats in the Solomons Overview & Review"
- Best Game Review or Analysis Website, Webcast, or Podcast: The Player's Aid (Blog & YouTube)
- Wargame of the Year: Atlantic Chase, GMT Games, designer Jeremy White
- James F. Dunnigan Design Elegance Award: David Thompson
- Clausewitz Award Hall of Fame: Chad Jensen
- Charles S. Roberts Best New Designer Award: Marc Rodrigue

=== 2022 ===
- Best Ancients Wargame: Great Battles of Julius Caesar Deluxe Edition, GMT Games, designers Richard H. Berg and Mark Herman
- Best Medieval Wargame: Almoravid, GMT Games, designer Volko Ruhnke
- Best Gunpowder Wargame: No Peace Without Honor, Compass Games, designer David Meyler
- Best Early Modern Wargame: Plains Indian Wars, GMT Games, designer John Poniske
- Best Napoleonic Wargame: Bonaparte in the Quadrilateral, OSG, designer Kevin Zucker
- Best American Civil War Wargame: A Most Fearful Sacrifice, Flying Pig Games, designer Hermann Luttmann
- Best Early 20th Century Wargame: 1914: Nach Paris, VUCA Simulations, designer Bertrand Munier
- Best World War II Wargame: Pacific War Second Edition, GMT Games, designer Mark Herman
- Best Modern Wargame: Flashpoint: South China Sea, GMT Games, designer Harold Buchanan
- Best Hypothetical Wargame: The Third World War Designer Signature Edition, Compass Games, designer Frank Chadwick
- Best Science Fiction or Fantasy Wargame: The Long Road, Flying Pig Games, designer Mark H. Walker
- Best Solitaire or Cooperative Wargame: Skies Above Britain, GMT Games, designers Jerry White and Gina Willis
- Best Expansion for an Existing Wargame: Fall of Saigon, for Fire in the Lake, GMT Games, designers Mark Herman and Volko Ruhnke
- Best Wargaming Magazine: Strategy & Tactics
- The Redmond A. Simonsen Memorial Award for Outstanding Wargame Presentation: A Most Fearful Sacrifice: The Three Days of Gettysburg, Flying Pig Games
- The James F. Dunnigan Award for Playability and Design: Volko Ruhnke
- The Charles S. Roberts Memorial Award for Best New Designer: Richard Whitaker (Into the Woods)
- CSR Awards (Clausewitz) Hall of Fame Inductees: Dana Lombardy, John Prados, Volko Ruhnke
- Wargame of the Year: A Most Fearful Sacrifice: The Three Days of Gettysburg, Flying Pig Games, designer Hermann Luttmann

=== 2023 ===
Source: Awarded June 24, 2024

- Best Ancients Game: Storm over Jerusalem, Multi-Man Publishing. Designed by Scott Blanton
- Best Medieval Game: Plantagenet: Cousins' War for England, GMT Games. Designed by Francisco Gradaille
- Best Gunpowder or Industrial Era Game: The Battle of White Plains, GMT Games. Designed by Mark Miklos
- Best Napoleonic Game: Bonaparte Overruns Piedmont, Operational Studies Group. Designed by Kevin Zucker
- Best American Civil War Game: Grand Havoc: Perryville 1862, Revolution Games. Designed by Jeff Grossman
- Best World War I Game: Western Front Ace, Compass Games. Designed by Gregory M. Smith and Ian Cooper
- Best World War II Game: Downfall: Conquest of the Third Reich, GMT Games. Designed by Chad Jensen and John Butterfield
- Best Modern Game: Valley of Tears, Multi-Man Publishing. Designed by Carl Fung
- Best Strategic Game: Downfall: Conquest of the Third Reich, GMT Games. Designed by Chad Jensen and John Butterfield
- Best Operational Game: Red Strike, VUCA Simulations. Designed by Yves Rettel
- Best Tactical Game: We Are Coming, Nineveh, Nuts! Publishing. Designed by Juliette Le Ménahèze, Harrison Brewer, Rex Brynen, and Brian Train
- Best New Edition of a Previously Published Game: On to Richmond II: The Union Strikes South, Multi-Man Publishing. Designed by Joseph Balkoski, Ed Beach and Chris Withers
- Best Political, Social, or Economic Game: Mr. President, GMT Games. Designed by Gene Billingsley
- Best Hypothetical Game: Red Strike, VUCA Simulations. Designed by Yves Rettel
- Best Solitaire or Cooperative Game: Halls of Hegra, Tompet Games. Designed by Petter Schanke Olsen
- Best Wargaming Magazine: C3i
- The Redmond A. Simonsen Memorial Award for Outstanding Wargame Presentation: Red Strike, VUCA Simulations. Artist Pablo Bazerque
- The James F. Dunnigan Award for Playability and Design: Mark Simonitch
- The Chad Jensen Memorial Breakthrough Designer Award: Yves Rettel, designer of Red Strike
- CSR Awards (Clausewitz) Hall of Fame Inductees: Tom Dalgliesh, Charles Kibler, Mark McLaughlin
- The Charles S. Roberts Game of the Year: Downfall: Conquest of the Third Reich, GMT Games. Designed by Chad Jensen and John Butterfield

=== 2024 ===
Source: Awarded June 20, 2025

- Best Ancients Game: The Fate of All. Designed by Fabrizio Vianello, published by Thin Red Line Games
- Best Medieval Game: Tanto Monta: The Rise of Ferdinand & Isabella. Designed by Carlos Diaz Navarez, published by GMT Games
- Best Gunpowder or Industrial Era Game: Cowpens 1781. Designed by Pascal Toupy, published in Vae Victis issue #176
- Best Napoleonic Game: I, Napoleon. Designed by Ted Raicer, published by GMT Games
- Best American Civil War Game: Rebel Fury. Designed by Mark Herman, published by GMT Games
- Best World War I Game: Schutztruppe: Heia Safari. Designed by Dennis Bishop, published by Compass Games
- Best World War II Game: Panzer North Africa. Designed by James M. Day and Fernando Sola Ramos, published by GMT Games
- Best Modern Game: Purple Haze. Designed by Bernard Grzybowski, published by PHALANX
- Best Strategic Game: Burning Banners. Designed by Christopher Moeller, published by Compass Games
- Best Operational Game: Thunder on the Mississippi. Designed by Joseph M. Balkoski and Chris Withers, published by Multi-Man Publishing
- Best Tactical Game: Panzer North Africa. Designed by James M. Day and Fernando Sola Ramos, published by GMT Games
- Best New Edition of a Previously Published Game: France '40: Second Edition. Designed by Mark Simonitch, published by GMT Games
- Best Political, Social, or Economic Game: Red Dust Rebellion. Designed by Jarrod Carmichael, published by GMT Games
- Best Hypothetical Game: Next War: Iran. Designed by Mitchell Land, published by GMT Games
- Best Solitaire or Cooperative Game: I, Napoleon. Designed by Ted Raicer, published by GMT Games
- Best Wargaming Magazine: C3i
- The Redmond A. Simonsen Memorial Award for Outstanding Wargame Presentation: Burning Banners, published by Compass Games. Graphics by Christopher Moeller
- The James F. Dunnigan Award for Playability and Design: Mark Herman
- The Chad Jensen Memorial Breakthrough Designer Award: Carlos Diaz Narvaez, for Tanto Monta
- CSR Awards (Clausewitz) Hall of Fame Inductees: Frédéric Bey, Samuel Craig Taylor, Danny Parker
- The Charles S. Roberts Game of the Year: Panzer North Africa. Designed by James M. Day and Fernando Sola Ramos, published by GMT Games

Additionally, by unanimous agreement of the CSR Board of Governors, Rodger B. MacGowan is hereby inducted into the Charles S. Roberts Wargaming Hall of Fame.

== Previous award winners ==
=== 1974 to 1975 – Best Professional Game ===
Year	Game	Designer	Company
1974	Third Reich	John Prados	The Avalon Hill Game Company
1975	Kingmaker	Andrew McNeil	PhilMar Ltd.

=== 1974 to 1975, 1978 – Best Amateur Game ===
Year	Game	Designer	Company
1974	Manassas	Tom Eller	Historical Simulations Ltd.
1975	La Bataille de la Moskowa	Laurence Groves	Martial Enterprises
1978	Source of the Nile	David Wesely & Ross Maker	Discovery Games

=== 1976 to 1977 – Best Tactical Game ===
Year	Game	Designer	Company
1976	Terrible Swift Sword	Richard Berg	Simulation Publications Incorporated
1977	Squad Leader	John Hill	The Avalon Hill Game Company

=== 1976 to 1977 – Best Strategic Game ===
Year	Game	Designer	Company
1976	The Russian Campaign	John Edwards	The Avalon Hill Game Company
1977	Victory in the Pacific	Richard Hamblen	The Avalon Hill Game Company

=== 1978 to 1986 – Best Pre-20th century Game ===
Year	Game	Designer	Company
1978	Source of the Nile	David Wesely & Ross Maker	Discovery Games
1979	Napoleon at Leipzig	Kevin Zucker	Operational Studies Group
1980	Empires of the Middle Ages	Jim Dunnigan	Simulation Publications Incorporated
1981	A House Divided	Frank Chadwick	Game Designers' Workshop
1982	Civilization	Francis Tresham	The Avalon Hill Game Company
1983	The Civil War	Eric Lee Smith	Victory Games
1984	South Mountain	Richard Berg	West End Games
1985	Pax Britannica	Greg Costikyan	Victory Games
1986	Chickamauga	Jon Southard	West End Games

=== 1978 to 1986 – Best 20th century Game ===
Year	Game	Designer	Company
1978	To the Green Fields Beyond	David Isby	Simulation Publications Incorporated
1979	City Fight	Joseph Balkoski	Simulation Publications Incorporated
1980	Cresendo of Doom (Squad Leader module)	Don Greenwood	The Avalon Hill Game Company
1981	Wings	Craig Taylor	Yaquinto Publications
1982	Storm Over Arnhem	Courtney Allen	The Avalon Hill Game Company
1983	Ambush!	Eric Lee Smith	Victory Games
1984	Vietnam 1965 – 1975	Nick Karp	Victory Games
1985	World in Flames	Harry Rowland	Australian Design Group
1986	Fortress America	Mike Gray	Milton Bradley Company

=== 1987 to 2008 – Best Pre–World War Two Game ===
Year	Game	Designer	Company
1987	Shot & Shell	Roger Nord	World Wide Wargames
1988	Lee vs. Grant	Joseph Balkoski	Victory Games
1989	A House Divided (2nd ed.)	Frank Chadwick	Game Designers' Workshop
1990	Kadesh	Gary Dickens	XTR Corporation
1991	Alexandros	Mike Markowitz	XTR Corporation
1992	SPQR	Richard Berg & Mark Herman	GMT Games LLC
1993	When Eagles Fight	Ted Raicer	XTR Corporation
1994	Battles of Waterloo	Richard Berg	GMT Games LLC
1995	Great War in Europe	Ted Raicer	XTR Corporation
1996	Fields of Glory	Richard Berg	Moments in History
1997	All Quiet on the Western Front	Ted Raicer	Moments in History
1998	For the People	Mark Herman	The Avalon Hill Game Company
1999	Paths of Glory	Ted Raicer	GMT Games LLC
2000	Drive on Paris	Al Wambold	The Gamers Incorporated
2001	Wilderness War	Volko Runkhe	GMT Games LLC
2002	Napoleonic Wars	Mark McLaughlin	GMT Games LLC
2003	Age of Napoleon	Renaud Verlaque	Phalanx Games
2004	Sword of Rome	Wray Ferrell	GMT Games LLC
2005	Bonaparte at Marengo	Bowen Simmons	Simmons Games
2006	Here I Stand	Ed Beach	GMT Games LLC
2007	1914: Twilight in the East	Michael Resch	GMT Games LLC
2008	Warriors of God	Makoto Nakajima	Multi-Man Publishing

=== 2009 to 2012 – Best Ancient to Napoleonic Era Board Wargame ===
Year	Game	Designer	Company
2009	A Most Dangerous Time: Japan in Chaos, 1570–1584	Tetsuya Nakamura	Multi-Man Publishing
2010	Washington's War	Mark Herman	GMT Games
2011	Sekigahara	Matthew Calkins	GMT Games
2012	The Battle of Fontenoy	Mathew Hinkle	Clash of Arms

=== 2009 to 2012 – Best Post-Napoleonic to Pre–World War II Era Board Wargame ===
Year	Game	Designer	Company
2009	Battle Above the Clouds	Ed Beach & Mike Belles	Multi-Man Publishing
2010	The Spanish Civil War 1936–1939	Javier Romero	GMT Games
2011	None But Heroes	Dean Essig	Multi-Man Publishing
2012	Bloody April	Terry Simo	GMT Games

=== 1987 to 2012 – Best World War Two Game ===
Year	Game	Designer	Company
1987	Raid on St. Nazaire	Rob Markham	The Avalon Hill Game Company
1988	Tokyo Express	Jon Southard	Victory Games
1989	Hitler's Last Gamble	Danny Parker	World Wide Wargames
1990	Operation Shoestring	Gene Billingsley	GMT Games LLC
1991	East Front	Craig Besinque	Columbia Games
1992	Stalingrad Pocket	Masahiro Yamazaki	The Gamers Incorporated
1993	Afrika	Dean Essig	The Gamers Incorporated
1994	Enemy at the Gates	Dean Essig	The Gamers Incorporated
1995	Tunisia	Dean Essig	The Gamers Incorporated
1996	Wave of Terror	John Desch	XTR Corporation
1997	DAK	Dean Essig	The Gamers Incorporated
1998	Invasion: Sicily	Vance von Borries	GMT Games LLC
1999	Burma	Dave Friedrichs	The Gamers Incorporated
2000 (tie)	Sicily	Dean Essig	The Gamers Incorporated
2000 (tie)	Ukraine '43	Mark Simonitch	GMT Games LLC
2001	Barbarossa – Army Group North	Vance von Borries	GMT Games LLC
2002	Barbarossa to Berlin	Ted Raicer	GMT Games LLC
2003	Europe Engulfed	Rick Young & Jesse Evans	GMT Games LLC
2004	Advanced Squad Leader Starter Kit #1	Ken Dunn	Multi-Man Publishing
2005	Empire of the Sun	Mark Herman	GMT Games LLC
2006	A Victory Lost	Tetsuya Nakamura	Multi-Man Publishing
2007	Case Blue	Dean Essig	Multi-Man Publishing
2008	Conflict of Heroes	Uwe Eckert	Academy Games
2009	D-Day at Omaha Beach	John Butterfield	Decision Games
2010	Normandy '44	Mark Simonitch	GMT Games
2011	No Retreat: The Russian Front Deluxe Edition	Carl Paradis	GMT Games
2012	Red Winter	Mark Mokszycki	GMT Games

=== 1987 to 2012 – Best Post–World War Two or Modern Game ===
Year	Game	Designer	Company
1987 (tie)	Central America	James McQuaid	Victory Games
1987 (tie)	7th Fleet	Joseph Balkoski	Victory Games
1988	Tac Air	Gary Morgan	The Avalon Hill Game Company
1989	Modern Naval Battles	Dan Verssen	World Wide Wargames
1990	Silver Bayonet	Gene Billingsley	GMT Games LLC
1991 (tie)	Inchon	Jim Werbaneth	XTR Corporation
1991 (tie)	Hornet Leader	Dan Verssen	GMT Games LLC
1992	Tet '68	Joe Miranda	XTR Corporation
1993	Crisis: Korea 1995	Gene Billingsley	GMT Games LLC
1994	no award	-	-
1995	Yom Kippur	Al Sandrick	The Gamers Incorporated
1996	no award	-	-
1997	Semper Fi	Lee Forester	The Gamers Incorporated
1998	no award	-	-
1999	no award	-	-
2000	no award	-	-
2001	When Dragons Fight	Ty Bomba	XTR Corporation
2002 (tie)	Khe Sahn 1968	John Prados	Against the Odds Magazine
2002 (tie)	First Indochina War	Joe Miranda	Decision Games
2003	Lock 'n Load	Mark Walker	Shrapnel Games
2004	Downtown	Lee Brimmicombe-Wood	GMT Games LLC
2005	Twilight Struggle	Ananda Gupta & Jason Matthews	GMT Games LLC
2006	Winged Horse: Campaigns in Vietnam, 1965–66	Joe Miranda	Decision Games
2007	World at War: Eisenbach Gap	Mark H. Walker	Lock 'n Load Publishing
2008	Red Dragon Rising: The Coming War with China	Bruce Costello	Decision Games
2009	Elusive Victory	Terry Simo	GMT Games LLC
2010	Labyrinth: The War on Terror	Volko Ruhnke	GMT Games
2011	Lock 'n Load: Heroes of the Gap	Pete Abrams, Mark H. Walker	Lock 'n Load Publishing
2012	Andean Abyss	Volko Ruhnke	GMT Games

=== 1999 to 2012 – Best DTP Game (or Print and Play, from 2009) ===
Year	Game	Designer	Company
1999 (tie)	Bloody Beach: Omaha	Bill Ramsey	Bill Ramsey
1999 (tie)	Chantilly	Hampton Newsome	Ivy Street Games
2000	Solomon Sea	Markus Stumptner	Simulations Workshop Incorporated
2001	Longbow	Richard Berg	BSO Games
2002 (tie)	A Mere Matter of Marching	Bruce MacFarlane	Microgame Design Group
2002 (tie)	Togoland 1914	Dennis Bishop	Khyber Pass Games
2003	Thunder on South Mountain	Scot Holmgren	Blue Guidon Games
2004	Louisiana Tigers	Richard Berg	BSO Games
2005	Death in the Trenches	Ben Madison and Wes Erni	Schutze Games
2006	Battle of the Little Bighorn	Micheal Taylor	Khyber Pass Games
2007	Rosebud: Prelude to Little Bighorn	Micheal Taylor	Khyber Pass Games
2008	June '44	Danny Holte	DHH Games
2009	Zulus on the Ramparts!	Joe Miranda	Victory Point Games
2010	We Must Tell the Emperor!	Steve Carey	Victory Point Games
2011	La Bataille d' Halle – 1806	Dennis A. Spors, James Soto, Monte Mattson, Michael Neylan	Marshal Enterprises
2012	City of Confusion: The Battle for Hue, Tet 1968	Paul Rohrbaugh	High Flying Dice Games

=== 1999 to 2012 – Best Magazine Game ===
Year	Game	Designer	Company
1999	Borodino & Friedland	Kevin Zucker	Decision Games (Strategy & Tactics)
2000	Xenophon	Joe Miranda	Decision Games (Strategy & Tactics)
2001	War of 1812	Tom Dalgliesh	Decision Games (Strategy & Tactics)
2002	First Indochina War	Joe Miranda	Decision Games (Strategy & Tactics)
2003	Ignorant Armies	Phil Sharp	Decision Games (Strategy & Tactics)
2004	Fortress Berlin	John Prados	Against the Odds Magazine
2005	Chennault's First Fight	Paul Rohrbaugh	Against the Odds Magazine
2006	Kulikovo 1380: the Golden Horde	Richard Berg	Against the Odds Magazine
2007	Not War But Murder	Michael Rinella	Against the Odds Magazine
2008	Iwo Jima: Rage Against the Marines	Takaharu Horie	Operations Magazine
2009	Deathride: Mars-la-Tour 1870	Charles Vasey	Against the Odds Magazine
2010	A Week in Hell	Laurent Guenette	Battles Magazine
2011	Into the Bastards! – First tank battle	Nicolas Rident	Battles Magazine
2012	Beyond Waterloo	John Prados	Against the Odds Magazine

=== 2009 to 2012 – Best Expansion or Supplement for an Existing Game ===
Year	Game	Designer	Company
2009	Panzerblitz Hill of Death mini-module Carentan	Darren Emge	Multi-Man Publishing
2010	Combat Commander: Battle Pack #3 – Normandy	John Foley	GMT Games
2011	Advanced Squad Leader: Starter Kit Expansion Pack #1	Ken Dunn	Multi-Man Publishing
2012	Advanced Squad Leader: Festung Budapest	Bill Cirillo	Multi-Man Publishing

=== 1974 to 2012 – Best Professional Wargaming Magazine ===
Year	Magazine	Publisher
1974	Strategy & Tactics	Simulation Publications Incorporated
1975	Strategy & Tactics	Simulation Publications Incorporated
1976	Strategy & Tactics	Simulation Publications Incorporated
1977	Strategy & Tactics	Simulation Publications Incorporated
1978	Fire & Movement	Rodger MacGowan & Baron Publishing
1979	Fire & Movement	Rodger MacGowan & Baron Publishing
1980	Fire & Movement	Rodger MacGowan & Baron Publishing
1981	Fire & Movement	Rodger MacGowan & Baron Publishing
1982	Fire & Movement	Friedrich Helfferich & Steve Jackson Games
1983	Fire & Movement	Friedrich Helfferich & Steve Jackson Games
1984	The Wargamer	World Wide Wargames
1985	The Wargamer	World Wide Wargames
1986	The Wargamer	World Wide Wargames
1987	Strategy & Tactics	World Wide Wargames
1988	Strategy & Tactics	World Wide Wargames
1989	Strategy & Tactics	World Wide Wargames
1990	Command	XTR Corporation
1991	Command	XTR Corporation
1992	Command	XTR Corporation
1993	Command	XTR Corporation
1994	Command	XTR Corporation
1995	Command	XTR Corporation
1996	Command	XTR Corporation
1997	Command	XTR Corporation
1998	Strategy & Tactics	Decision Games
1999	Strategy & Tactics	Decision Games
2000	Strategy & Tactics	Decision Games
2001	Strategy & Tactics	Decision Games
2002	Strategy & Tactics	Decision Games
2003	Against the Odds	Against the Odds Magazine
2004 (tie)	Against the Odds	Against the Odds Magazine
2004 (tie)	Strategy & Tactics	Decision Games
2005	Against the Odds	Against the Odds Magazine
2006	Against the Odds	Against the Odds Magazine
2007	Against the Odds	Against the Odds Magazine
2008	C3i	RBM Publishing
2009	Battles	Olivier Revenu
2010	Battles	Olivier Revenu
2011	Battles	Olivier Revenu
2012	C3i	RBM Publishing

=== 1974 to 2012 – Best Amateur Wargaming Magazine ===
Year	Magazine	Publisher
1974	Albion	Don Turnbull
1975	Jagdpanther	Jagdpanther Publications
1976	Battlefield/Jagdpanther	Jagdpanther Publications
1977	The Space Gamer	Steve Jackson Games
1978	Perfidious Albion	Charles Vasey
1979	Perfidious Albion	Charles Vasey
1980	HMS Review*	Herb Barents
1981	Journal of World War Two Wargaming	Nick Schuessler
1982	Journal of 20th Century Wargaming	Nick Schuessler
1983	Journal of 20th Century Wargaming	Nick Schuessler
1984	Alarums and Excursions	Lee Gold
1985	The V.I.P of Gaming	Alan Emrich
1986	The Midwest Wargamers' Association Newsletter	Hal Thinglum
1987	Volunteers – Civil War Gaming Newsletter	Bill Koff
1988	Volunteers – Civil War Gaming Newsletter	Bill Koff
1989	The Canadian Wargaming Journal	Canadian Wargaming Group
1990	The Canadian Wargaming Journal	Canadian Wargaming Group
1991	The Canadian Wargaming Journal	Canadian Wargaming Group
1992	The Canadian Wargaming Journal	Canadian Wargaming Group
1993	Paper Wars	Hexessential Publications
1994	Paper Wars	Hexessential Publications
1995	Berg's Review of Games (BROG)	Richard Berg
1996	Berg's Review of Games (BROG)	Richard Berg
1997	Berg's Review of Games (BROG)	Richard Berg
1998	Berg's Review of Games (BROG)	Richard Berg
1999	The Boardgamer	Bruce Monnin
2000	The Boardgamer	Bruce Monnin
2001	The Boardgamer	Bruce Monnin
2002	The Boardgamer	Bruce Monnin
2003	Panzerschreck	Minden Games
2004	Panzerschreck	Minden Games
2005	Panzerschreck	Minden Games
2006	Line of Departure	Jim Werbaneth
2007	Line of Departure	Jim Werbaneth
2008	Line of Departure	Jim Werbaneth
2009	Panzer Digest	Minden Games
2010	Line of Departure	Jim Werbaneth
2011	Line of Departure	Jim Werbaneth
2012	1914 Dispatches	Oregon Consim Gamers

- – formerly Swabbers

=== 1987 to 2012 – Best Historical or Scenario Magazine Article ===
Year	Article	Writer	Magazine
1987	Aesthetics, Function and History in Wargame Graphics	Rodger MacGowan	The Wargamer Vol. 2, #3
1988	Forrest at Bay	Richard Berg	Strategy & Tactics #119
1989	Rush for Glory	Richard Hitchman	Strategy & Tactics #127
1990 (tie)	Borodino	Gary Morgan	Strategy & Tactics #136
1990 (tie)	Enter Rommel	Frank Watson	Europa Magazine #15
1991	Desert Storm	Bo Eldridge	Command #13
1992	Russo-Japanese War	Ron Bell	Command #19
1993	When Eagles Fight: First World War in the East	Ted Raicer	Command #25
1994	No Award	-	-
1995	Bunker Hill	William Marsh	Command #32
1996	No Award	-	-
1997	End of Empire, Parts I and II	William Marsh	Command #46
1998	The Meuse-Argonne: America's Last Offensive of the Great War	John Desch	Command #51
1999	Equus: Cavalry Battles of the Second Punic War	Dan Fournie	C3i #10
2000	French Foreign Legion	Timothy Kutta	Strategy & Tactics #200
2001	The Boer War, 1899–1902	Joseph Miranda	Strategy & Tactics #205
2002	Overshadowed by a Phrase: Pyrrhus	David W. Tschanz	C3i #14
2003	Napoleon at the Berezina	Rob Markham	Against the Odds #4
2004	The Sedan Campaign of 1870: An Analysis	Ty Bomba	Strategy & Tactics #224
2005	No Winner Declared*	-	-
2006	No Award	-	-
2007	Not War But Murder: The Cold Harbor Campaign – 1864	Michael Rinella	Against the Odds #19
2008 (tie)	Combat Commander: Variant Rules	Chad Jensen and John Foley	C3i #21
2008 (tie)	Flying Colors: Trafalgar Campaign	Mark Barker	C3i #20
2009	For the People – 10th Anniversary Variant Rules	Mark Herman	C3i #23
2010	History of the Peloponnesian War	Joel Toppen	C3i #24
2011	To Script or Not to Script, that is the question?	Mark Herman	C3i #25
2012	1914 – A postwar Solution for Austria-Hungary's Mobilization	Michael Resch	C3i #26

- – only Honorable Mentions

=== 1987 to 2012 – Best Game Review or Game Analysis ===
Year	Article	Writer	Magazine
1987	Central America	Tom Slizewsk	Fire & Movement #56
1988	Lee vs. Grant	Keith Poulter	The Wargamer Vol. 2, #5
1989	World War II Anthology, Part I	Vance Von Borries	Fire & Movement #60
1990	D-Elim	Ulrich & Dirk Blennemann	Command #2
1991	The Evolution of Simulation Design	John Schettler	MOVES #65
1992	August Storm: Franco-Prussian War	Ulrich & Dirk Blennemann	MOVES #72
1993–95	No Award	-	-
1996	A Fleet Squandered	Tom Dworschak	Command #40
1997	Panzergruppe Guderian	Ted Kim	SPI Revival eZine #1
1998	Home Before the Leaves Fall	Rick Lechowich	Fire & Movement #116
1999	La Bataille de Lutzen	Juan Rosario	Paper Wars #32
2000	Clash of Arms' Summer Storm	Greg Ullrich	Paper Wars #33
2001	Hube's Pocket Analysis	Tony Zbaraschuk	Operations #41
2002	Enjoying a Slice of Sicilian	Adam Starkweather	Paper Wars #48
2003	Drive on Stalingrad	Adam Starkweather	Paper Wars #50
2004	No Award	-	-
2005	Empire of the Sun Strategy Concepts	Mark Herman	C3i #17
2006	No Award	-	-
2007	The Evolution of Cards and Wargame	John Prados	Against the Odds #19
2008 (tie)	Top 20 Games – A Look Back	Steve Carey	C3i #20
2008 (tie)	Empire of the Sun: Opening Strategy	Mark Herman	C3i #21
2009	Liberty Roads review	François Xavier Euzet	Battles #2
2010	Washington's War, Art of Asymmetrical Strategy	Mark Herman	C3i #24
2011	Labyrinth	David Hughes	Battles #6
2012	For the People – Defending the Union	Dave Dockter, Mark Herman	C3i #25

=== 1976 to 2012 – Best Wargame Graphics ===
Year	Game	Artist	Publisher
1976	Avalanche: The Salerno Landings	Rich Banner	Game Designers' Workshop
1977	no award	-	-
1978	Cross of Iron (Squad Leader module)	Scott Moores	The Avalon Hill Game Company
1979	no award	-	-
1980	no award	-	-
1981	no award	-	-
1982	no award	-	-
1983	no award	-	-
1984	Vietnam 1965 – 1975	Ted Koller	Victory Games
1985	Pax Britannica	Ted Koller (Jim Talbot – map)	Victory Games
1986	Korean War	Ted Koller	Victory Games
1987	Raid on St. Nazaire	Charles Kibler	The Avalon Hill Game Company
1988 (tie)	Lee vs. Grant	Ted Koller	Victory Games
1988 (tie)	The Campaigns of Robert E. Lee	Rick Barber (map)	Clash of Arms Games
1989	Hitler's Last Gamble	Dean Essig	World Wide Wargames
1990	Kadesh	Larry Hoffman (counters) & (Mark Simonitch – map)	XTR Corporation
1991	Hornet Leader	Rodger MacGowan	GMT Games LLC
1992	SPQR	Rodger MacGowan (Mark Simonitch – map)	GMT Games LLC
1993	Lion of the North	Rodger MacGowan (Mark Simonitch – map)	GMT Games LLC
1994	Battles of Waterloo	Rodger MacGowan (Mark Simonitch – map)	GMT Games LLC
1995	Yom Kippur	Dean Essig	The Gamers Incorporated
1996	GD '41	Dean Essig	The Gamers Incorporated
1997	DAK	Dean Essig	The Gamers Incorporated
1998	Saratoga 1777	Rodger MacGowan (Joe Youst – map)	GMT Games LLC
1999	River of Death	Rodger MacGowan (Joe Youst – map)	GMT Games LLC
2000	Brandywine Creek	Rodger MacGowan (Joe Youst – map)	GMT Games LLC
2001	Wilderness War	Rodger MacGowan (Mark Simonitch – map)	GMT Games LLC
2002	Streets of Stalingrad (3rd ed.)	Joe Youst (map)	L2 Design Group
2003	Ardennes '44	Rodger MacGowan (Mark Simonitch – map)	GMT Games LLC
2004	Downtown	Rodger MacGowan (Lee Brimmicombe-Wood – map)	GMT Games LLC
2005 (tie)	Empire of the Sun	Rodger MacGowan (Mark Simonitch – map)	GMT Games LLC
2005 (tie)	Fire in the Sky	Nicolas Eskubi	Multi-Man Publishing
2006	A Victory Lost	Nicolas Eskubi	Multi-Man Publishing
2007 (tie)	1914: Twilight in the East	Markus Brown, Michael Resch, (Mark Simonitch – map)	GMT Games LLC
2007 (tie)	Overlord	Mark Hinkle	New England Simulations
2008	Conflict of Heroes	Steve Paschal	Academy Games
2009	Battle Above the Clouds	Charles Kibler & Nicolas Eskubi	Multi-Man Publishing
2010	Normandy '44	Mark Simonitch	GMT Games
2011	Where Eagles Dare	Nicolas Eskubi	Multi-Man Publishing
2012	The Battle of Fontenoy	Charles Kibler	Clash of Arms

=== 1979 to 1981 – Best Initial Release Wargame ===
Year	Recipient	Game	Company
1979	Ironclads	John Fuseler	Yaquinto Publications
1980	Streets of Stalingrad	Dana Lombardy	Phoenix Games
1981	Ironbottom Sound	Jack Greene	Quarterdeck Games

=== 1977 to 1986 and 2010 to 2012 – Best Fantasy or Science Fiction Wargame ===
Year	Game	Recipient	Company
1977	War of the Rings	Richard Berg	Simulation Publications Incorporated
1978	Mayday	Marc Miller	Game Designers' Workshop
1979	The Creature That Ate Sheboygan	Greg Costikyan	Simulation Publications Incorporated
1980	Azhanti High Lightning	Frank Chadwick	Game Designers' Workshop
1981: Sci-Fi	Car Wars	Chad Irby & Steve Jackson	Steve Jackson Games
1981: Fantasy	Barbarian Prince	Arnold Hendrick	Dwarfstar Games
1982: Sci-Fi	Illuminati	Steve Jackson	Steve Jackson Games
1982: Fantasy	Sherlock Holmes Consulting Detective	Gary Grady, Raymond Edwards & Suzanne Goldberg	Sleuth Publications
1983: Sci-Fi	Nuclear Escalation	Douglas Malewicki	Flying Buffalo
1983: Fantasy	Lost Worlds	Alfred Leonardi	Nova Game Designs
1984: Sci-Fi	Web & Starship	Greg Costikyan	West End Games
1984: Fantasy	Lonely Mountain	Coleman Charlton	Iron Crown Enterprises
1985	Wabbit Wampage	Mark Acres	Pacesetter Games
1986	Kings & Things	Tom Wham & Robert J. Kuntz	West End Games
2010	War of the Ring Collector's Edition	Roberto di Meglio, Marco Maggi, Francesco Nepitello	Fantasy Flight Games
2011	Space Empires 4X	Jim Krohn	GMT Games
2012	Star Wars: X-Wing Miniatures Game	Jeffrey Kniffen	Fantasy Flight Games

=== 1989 to 2012 – James F. Dunnigan Award for Playability and Design ===
To a Game Designer, Developer, Graphic Artist or Game for outstanding achievement in that year

Year	Recipient	Game	Company
1989	Dan Verssen & Rodger MacGowan	Modern Naval Battles**	World Wide Wargames
1990	Don Greenwood	Republic of Rome	The Avalon Hill Game Company
1991 (tie)	Mark Simonitch	The Legend Begins	Rhino Games
1991 (tie)	Craig Besinque	East Front**	Columbia Games
1992	Ben Knight	Victory at Midway	XTR Corporation
1993	Dean Essig	Afrika	The Gamers Incorporated
1994	Dean Essig	Enemy at the Gates	The Gamers Incorporated
1995	Ted Raicer	Great War in Europe	XTR Corporation
1996	Ty Bomba	Command magazine	XTR Corporation
1997	Dean Essig	DAK	The Gamers Incorporated
1998	Mark Herman	For the People	The Avalon Hill Game Company
1999	Ted Raicer	Paths of Glory	GMT Games LLC
2000	Mark Simonitch	Ukraine '43	GMT Games LLC
2001	Volko Ruhnke	Wilderness War	GMT Games LLC
2002	Ben Hull	This Accursed Civil War	GMT Games LLC
2003	Rick Young & Jesse Evans	Europe Engulfed	GMT Games LLC
2004	Lee Brimmicombe-Wood	Downtown	GMT Games LLC
2005	Ananda Gupta & Jason Matthews	Twilight Struggle	GMT Games LLC
2006	Tetsuya Nakamura	A Victory Lost	Multi-Man Publishing
2007	Dean Essig	Case Blue and the OCS series	Multi-Man Publishing
2008	Uwe Eickert	Conflict of Heroes	Academy Games
2009	John Butterfield	D-Day at Omaha Beach	Decision Games
2010	Volko Ruhnke	Labyrinth: The War on Terror	GMT Games
2011	Adam Starkweather	The Devil's Cauldron & Where Eagles Dare	Multi-Man Publishing
2012	Dean Essig	It Never Snows and the SCS series	Multi-Man Publishing

- – In 1989 and 1991 the game won the award.

== Leading CSR award winners for wargames (1974 to 2011) ==
These totals include awards for games, magazine games, game graphics and (for designers) the James F. Dunnigan award. Not included are awards for magazines, computer media and articles.

=== by game company ===
47 – GMT Games LLC
16 – Multi-Man Publishing
13 – The Gamers Incorporated
12 – The Avalon Hill Game Company
12 – Victory Games
10 – Decision Games
9 – XTR Corporation
6 – Simulation Publications Incorporated
6 – Against the Odds Magazine
5 – Game Designers' Workshop
4 – World Wide Wargames
4 – West End Games
3 – Clash of Arms
3 – Khyber Pass Games

=== by game designer or graphic artist ===
16 – Dean Essig
13 – Rodger MacGowan
9 – Richard Berg
8 – Ted Raicer
6 – Joe Miranda
6 – Mark Herman
5 – Volko Ruhnke
5 – Mark Simonitch
4 – John Prados
4 – Ted Koller
4 – Nicolas Eskubi
3 – Frank Chadwick
3 – Joseph Balkoski
3 – Greg Costikyan
3 – Dan Verssen
3 – Charles Kibler

== Charles Roberts Awards Hall of Fame ==
The Charles S. Roberts Awards Hall of Fame, formally known as the Clausewitz Award Hall of Fame, is named after military writer Carl von Clausewitz. The recipients of this award have made an important contribution and left their mark on the contemporary hobby of military strategy games and simulations.

Inductees

- 1974 - Charles S. Roberts
- 1974 - Don Turnbull
- 1975 - Jim Dunnigan
- 1976 - Tom Shaw
- 1977 - Redmond A. Simonsen
- 1978 - John Hill
- 1979 - David Isby
- 1980 - E Gary Gygax
- 1981 - Marc W. Miller
- 1982 - Steve Jackson
- 1983 - Dave Arneson
- 1984 - Frank Chadwick
- 1986 - Lou Zocchi
- 1987 - Richard Berg
- 1988 - Ty Bomba
- 1989 - Joseph Balkoski
- 1990 - Jack Greene
- 1991 - Mark Herman
- 1992 - Larry Hoffman
- 1993 - Dean Essig
- 1994 - Don Greenwood
- 1995 - Chris Perello
- 1996 - Ted Raicer
- 1997 - Dave Powell
- 1998 - Vance von Borries
- 2000 - Winston Hamilton
- 2001 - Joseph Miranda
- 2002 - Mark Simonitch
- 2003 - Kevin Zucker
- 2004 - JD Webster
- 2009 - John Butterfield
- 2010 - Richard Borg
- 2011 - Ed Wimble
- 2012 - Brian Youse
- 2013-2018 - No award
- 2019 - Paul Banner
- 2020 - Walter Vejdovsky
- 2021 - Chad Jensen
- 2022 - Dana Lombardy, John Prados, Volko Ruhnke
- 2023 - Tom Dalgliesh, Charles Kibler, Mark McLaughlin
- 2024 - Frédéric Bey, Samuel Craig Taylor, Danny Parker, Rodger B. MacGowan

== See also ==
- Charles S. Roberts
- Origins Awards
- World Boardgaming Championships
