= Glory (wargame) =

American Civil War wargame

- Cover art by Rodger B. MacGowan
- Designers: Richard Berg
- Illustrators: Rodger B. MacGowan; Rick Barber
- Publishers: GMT Games
- Publication: 1995
- Genres: American Civil War

Glory, subtitled "The Battles of First & Second Manassas and Chickamauga, 1861-63", is a board wargame published by GMT Games in 1995 that simulates three battles from the American Civil War (ACW). It was the first in a series of three wargames that used the same rules to simulate several ACW battles.

== Description ==
Glory is a two-player board wargame in which one player controls Union forces and the other controls Confederate forces.

=== Components ===
The game box contains two 22" x 34" hex grid maps scaled at 250 yards (230 m) per hex; 420 counters; an 8-page rule book and 8-page scenario book; and various player aids.

=== Gameplay ===
The game has four options for play:

1. I Go, You Go x2: Each player moves and attacks twice per turn, the order determined by random draw. Depending on the draw, it is possible for the first player to move twice before the opposing player moves.
2. Standard: A counter for every division on the board is put into a cup. A division may only move and attack once its counter is drawn. (One critic commented, "Constant and heroic is each player's struggle to impose order on the chaos created by the real commander-in-chief, General Coffee Mug.")
3. Overall Command Capability Method: Two counters for every division on the board are put into a cup, but the number of draws each turn is limited, so a division may be picked to move and attack twice, or it may not be picked at all. One critic noted "This version tends to slow reinforcement arrivals, carrying the battles away from history in a way that is arbitrary and meaningless."
4. Historical Reality Method: A counter is put into a cup for every division on the board. Then players choose a select number of their formations to receive a second counter. Those divisions will move twice in a turn, while all other units will only move once.

=== Result of combat ===
The first time a unit takes damage it is disordered. The second time, it is routed. The third time, if it has not been reordered, it is eliminated.

=== Scenarios ===
There are three scenarios included in the game, each representing a battle:

1. First Manassas: 8 turns representing a single day of battle.
2. Second Manassas: 28 turns representing 3 days.
3. Chickamauga: 3 days.

== Publication history ==
Glory was designed by Richard Berg, and was published in 1995 by GMT Games with cover art by Rodger B. MacGowan and cartography by Rick Barber.

GMT produced two more games in this series using the same rules: Glory II : Fredericksburg and Chancellorsville (2002), and Glory III : Antietam and Cedar Creek (2007).

== Reception ==
In Issue 45 of The Canadian Wargaming Journal, Keith Martens called this "a valiant attempt by GMT to produce a simpler game for beginners and gamers who want to finish a game in a reasonable time." But Martens called the lack of examples in the rules "a glaring omission ... not so simple for the novice." Despite this, Martens found that the game "seems to play fast (4 hours for each day of the battle) and the pulsing nature of combat means both players are involved." Marten concluded, "All in all a pretty good feel to the game with a minimum of chrome but veteran gamers may be better served by [GMT's more complex] Gamers Brigade Series."

In Issue 8 of Zone of Control, the team of Kevin Donovan, John W. Kisner and John A. Walker noted that the scenario books contained some serious set up errors, but they liked the simplicity of the game and its single page of tables. They felt that the first three methods of determining move order turned the game into randomness being supervised by a bunch of chimpanzees, but they felt the fourth "Overall Command Capability Method" returned control of the game to the players. They concluded, "Great graphics, minimal space requirements, and four sequences of play — one of which makes eminent sense — should justify everyone taking a good look at this one. You don't have to be a four-handed economist to conclude that it's well worth the dollars and time (considerable in the larger battles) to purchase and play Glory."

In The General, Charles Bahl found the best feature of the game was the random counter activation system, noting, "This kind of an activation system makes it hard to fully coordinate your units ... the activation markers add a great deal of tension to the whole process of running a battle. You never quite feel that you have your troops totally under control, and the battle often moves in some unexpected directions."

== Other reviews and commentary ==
- Perfidious Albion #93
- Fire & Movement #113
