= Here I Stand (boardgame) =

Board game

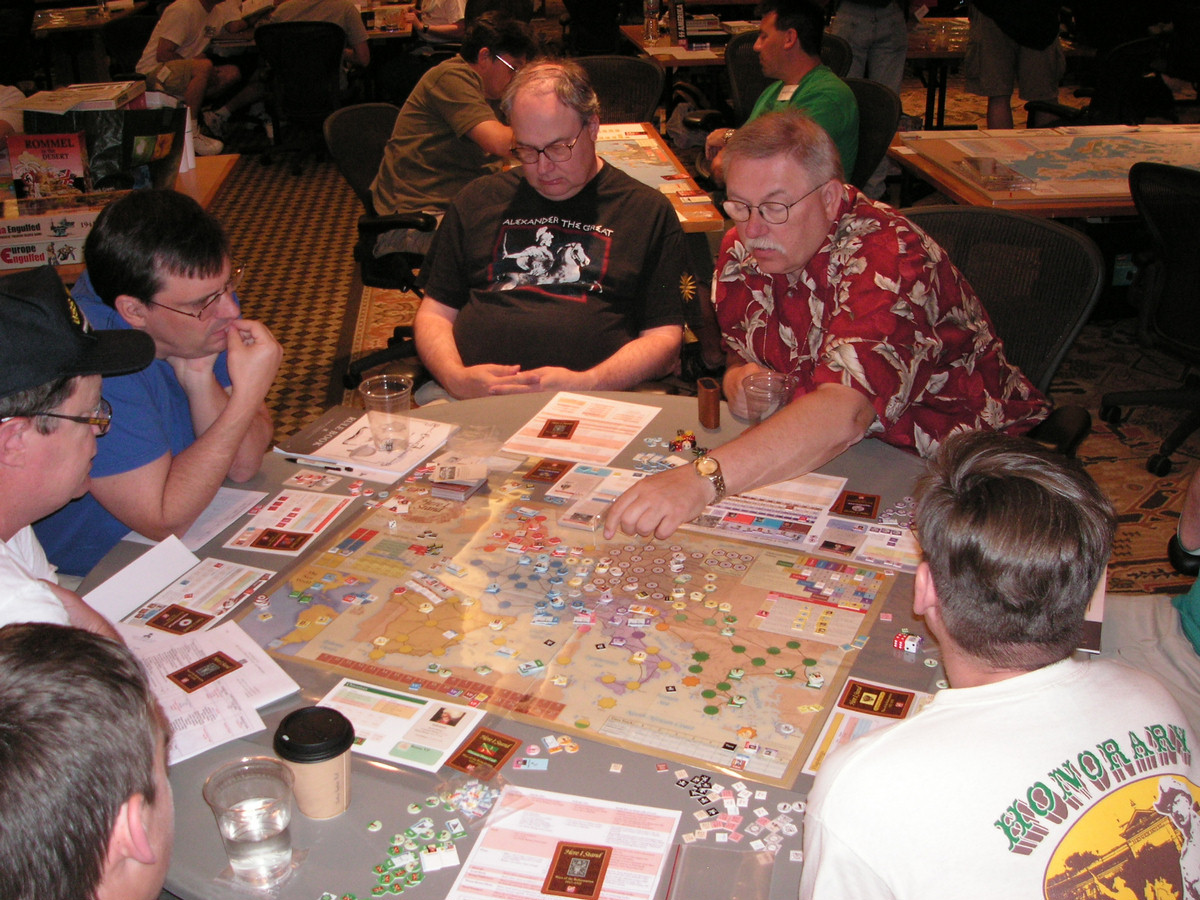
Here I Stand played at a tournament

Here I Stand is a board wargame first published by GMT Games in 2006.

== Description ==
Here I Stand is a card-based wargame in which players struggle for religious and political influence over early 16th century Europe during the Reformation. It can be played by up to 6 players, who represent the Habsburg Empire, the Ottoman Empire, England, France, The Papacy, and The Protestants. The game begins in 1517 and ends in 1555, taking up to 9 turns to play each representing about 4 years of history.

The game is played in "impulses", with each player, one after the other, playing a single card during their impulse. Each card has a number on it indication the number of "command points" it grants the player, as well as text of a specific event, and generally players choose to either use the command points or to enact the event but not both. Command points are used to execute various military, political, religious, or exploratory actions such as moving armies or fleets, besieging a fortress, establishing overseas colonies, calling religious debates, or burning heretical books. The events on the cards represent either a specific historical detail (e.g. the Council of Trent), or a general occurrence such as the bribing of enemy mercenaries.

Victory is determined by the first player to exceed 25 Victory Points (VP), or the player with the most at the end of the game. VP are gained in a variety of ways which are slightly different for each of the 6 sides, but include things like controlling key cities or electorates, exploring the New World, the death or disgrace of opposing religious leaders, building castles or cathedrals, or successful piracy expeditions.

== Publication history ==
Here I Stand was first published by GMT Games in 2006, and was designed by Ed Beach, Matthew Beach, and Dave Cross.

A related sequel game, Virgin Queen (the title refers to Queen Elizabeth I), covering the second half of the 16th century, was published by GMT Games in 2012.

A 500th Anniversary Edition (commemorating Martin Luther's posting of his 95 Theses), featuring revised rules, new cards and other updates, was published in 2017.

== Reception ==
Uli Blennemann comments: "Here I Stand offers a ton of period flavor, and it is a game that tells you a story. What's more, it's better than a book or a movie. With just a little bit of imagination, you write a part of that story."

Here I Stand won the 2006 Charles S. Roberts Award for Best Pre–World War II Boardgame.

The game has been consistently ranked near or in the Top 10 of Boardgamegeek's War Game Rank since its release, peaking around 2011, although its ranking has been slowly declining over the years (#4 in 2011–2013, #5 in 2015, #7 in 2017, #8 in 2019, #9 in 2021). Likewise, its general rank has declined from around Top 50 in early 2010s to Top 250 in early 2020s.

== Online play ==
Currently, there is no official digital platform for "Here I Stand that features full rules enforcement. However, some community-driven projects are under development to provide a scripted experience in the near future.

In the meantime, online matches are primarily conducted using the Vassal Engine module and/or ACTS (Automated Card Tracking System) for card management. These tools are typically complemented by communication platforms such as WhatsApp or Discord to facilitate the game's heavy diplomatic interaction.

Despite the lack of an automated client, there is a highly developed online community centered around the web www.hereistand.app, which serves as a hub for tournaments and matchmaking.
