= Panzer Digest =

- Editor: Gary Graber
- Categories: Wargaming
- Frequency: Quarterly
- Publisher: Minden Games
- Founded: 2007
- Country: United States
- Based in: Glendale, Arizona
- Website: Minden Games

Panzer Digest is a wargaming periodical published by Minden Games. It is published quarterly in a digest format. The digest is edited by Gary Graber.

== History ==
The magazine first appeared in 2007. In 2009 it received a Charles S. Roberts Award for "best amateur magazine". The magazine has also received favourable notice on the Consimworld website.

== Content ==
The magazine offers microgames, game reviews, and commentary on the board wargaming industry in the English-speaking world.
