= The Sword and the Stars =

Board game

The Sword and the Stars is a science fiction board game of empire building published by Simulations Publications, Inc. (SPI) in 1981 that is based on the rules from the previously published medieval wargame Empires of the Middle Ages (EOTMA).

== Description ==
The Sword and the Stars is a board game for 1–5 players, each of whom controls an empire of star systems in the far future. The rules system is largely taken from SPI's previous published medieval wargame Empires of the Middle Ages, with the setting changed from the Middle Ages to a science fiction milieu.

=== Components ===
The game box holds:

- 17" x 22" map of 42 star systems
- 56 Year cards
- two six-sided dice
- 400 die-cut counters
- rules booklet

=== Gameplay ===
The object of the game is to create and grow an empire in terms of wealth, reach and stability.

==== Round ====
Each Round represents five years of game time.

- To begin a round, the Year cards are shuffled, and each player receives five facedown. Players are not allowed to look at them.
- Players determine if a Raider and/or an Outworlder will be active this Round
- The player who has the highest Sector Level total chooses when they wish to play during that Round (first, second, last, etc.). The other players determine their order the same way.
- Once a player order has been determined, the active player
  - draws an Event chit, which they turn face up and apply the result. The exception is a Hold chit, which the player can either use or keep for the future.
  - undertakes at least one endeavor. This may include conquest, pillaging, fortification, ruling, and diplomacy. If an endeavor involves another player's area, the second player may announce a defensive endeavor. The active player turns over a Year card and applies the results to their endeavor. (If there is a defending player, that player also turns up a Year card and applies the result.)
  - collect Resource Points via taxation from areas within their Empire
  - decide to continue with more endeavors, each of which will use a Year card, or end their turn, saving Year cards for possible defensive needs.

Once all player have had a turn, the next Round is played.

==== Game Turn ====
Five Rounds (representing 25 years of game time) is a Game Turn.

=== Scenarios and campaign game ===
Ten scenarios are included that range in length from 200 years to a long Campaign of at least 1000 years.

=== Ending a scenario ===
Each scenario lists two possible ways to finish. The first is to play the scenario through to its last stated Game Turn. The second is that a majority of the players can vote to end the scenario early. Most scenarios have a mandatory number of Game Turns that must be completed before a vote can happen.

=== Victory conditions ===
The player with the most Victory Points (which are earned in various ways according to each scenario) is the winner.

== Publication history ==
In 1980, SPI published Empires of the Middle Ages (EOTMA), a simulation of the building of medieval empires in Europe designed by Jim Dunnigan, Anthony Buccini and Redmond A. Simonsen. The following year, SPI used the same set of rules with some revisions to produce The Sword and the Stars, a board game designed by Eric Lee Smith, with artwork by John W. Pierard, and graphic design by Redmond A. Simonsen. While EOTMA proved to be relatively popular, Sword and the Stars failed to find an audience.

== Reception ==
In Issue 50 of the British wargaming magazine Perfidious Albion, Charles Vasey called this "Empires of the Middle Ages goes into Space", noting " The old Empires player will recognize the new counters (instead of revolting peasants waving pitch-forks, they are waving zapper rays) and he will also recognize most of the rules. The question is whether you would rather be attacking Beautiful Zelda from Galaxy Five or invading Lombardy. On balance I would rather be in Philadelphia."

Brian McCue reviewed The Sword and the Stars in The Space Gamer No. 43. McCue commented that "I'd recommend The Sword and the Stars to any die-hard Empires of the Middle Ages player, to anybody who wants a less expensive alternative for that game, and to people who play SF but not historical games. The game system is great; only the historical appeal of the older game is lacking."

In Issue 9 of Ares, Justin Leites called the game "an interesting strategic overview of the differences inherent in building and maintaining a galaxy-wide empire."

In a retrospective review in Issue 4 of Simulacrum, Brian Train noted, "Sword and the Stars seems, in the end, not to have materially increased the appeal of the EOTMA game system. Probably its best customers were those who already owned or were familiar with the earlier game." Train concluded, "On the whole, this game is a solid adaptation of a good system to a new milieu; however, it never got the posthumous populrity that EOTMA did."

== Other reviews and commentary ==
- Campaign #105
- Grenadier #13
- Jeux & Stratégie #15
