= Thunder on South Mountain =

Board game

- Designers: Scott Holmgren
- Publishers: Blue Guidon
- Players: 1-2
- Setup time: 5–15 minutes
- Playing time: 4 hours
- Chance: Medium (Dice)
- Age range: 12 and up
- Skills: Strategy

Thunder on South Mountain is a board wargame that simulates the American Civil War battle of South Mountain Maryland, fought on September 14, 1862. In this battle, Union forces fought under the command of Maj. Gen. George B. McClellan and Confederate forces were under the command of Maj. Gen. Daniel Harvey Hill. Players play the role of these commanders in this tactical, brigade-level simulation. The game has low complexity and an emphasis on command and control.

== Awards ==
Thunder on South Mountain won the 2003 Charles S. Roberts Award for best desktop publishing produced boardgame.

== See also ==
- Tabletop game
- Tactical wargame
