= Bonaparte at Marengo =

Napoleonic board wargame published in 2005

- Cover featuring artwork of 19th-century French artist Auguste Raffet
- Designers: Rachel Simmons
- Publishers: Simmons Games
- Players: Two
- Playing time: 2 hours
- Chance: Some
- Skills: Strategy

Bonaparte at Marengo is a strategy board wargame published by Simmons Games in 2005 that simulates the Battle of Marengo during the War of the Second Coalition in 1800.

== Background ==
In early 1800, Napoleon Bonaparte, the First Consul of France, was fighting for his political life and needed a strong victory in his Italian campaign against Austria. Seeking to besiege an Austrian army defending Alessandria on 14 June 1800, Bonaparte instead was surprised when Austrian general Michael von Melas sent his army out of the city on a sortie against the French. For a time, the Austrians drove the French back and threatened to overcome them, until a French relief force under Louis Desaix arrived in the afternoon and tilted the balance in favor of the French. Desaix was killed in the battle.

== Description ==
Bonaparte at Marengo is a relatively short two-player board wargame in which one player controls French forces signified by thin blue rectangular wooden blocks, while the other player controls Austrian forces, which are red blocks. The design of the blocks comes from the 19th-century German wargame called Kriegspiel. The unit information and strength of each block is only printed on one side, which is not visible to the opponent until revealed by combat. If a unit takes casualties, then the original wooden block is replaced by a new block reflecting the unit's lower strength.

The map is divided into areas rather than using a hex grid. Each area on the map has several approaches and a reserve area. One army must block all of the approaches to an area to deny the enemy the ability to force them out. If, for example, the Austrians have covered all the approaches to an area, then the French are forced into a frontal assault, where casualties for both sides are determined dicelessly by odds ratio. If, however, the Austrians have left one or more approaches to an area open, then the French can use these approaches to enter the area, and if the French can link up several units in several approaches, they then can force the Austrians to retreat with casualties.

Also featured on the map are eight Victory Point locations, marked on one edge of the map furthest from the Austrian army. These are color-coded red, blue and green.

Each player is limited to moving three groups of pieces overland each turn. However, units moving along a road are not subject to this limitation. However, no more than three units can touch the same road segment in a turn.

Each side starts the game with a pool of morale points (17 for the French, 16 for the Austrians). An army loses a morale point for each point of damage it takes.

=== Victory conditions ===
- If one army has morale points left at the end of the game, and the other side does not, then the side with intact morale wins.
- If both armies have morale points left, or both armies have no morale points left then:
  - The Austrian player wins by occupying 2 of the 8 Victory Point locations marked at the back edge of the map, as long as the two locations are different colors.
  - The French player wins by preventing this.

== Publication history ==
While wargaming in the 1980s, Rachel Simmons became disillusioned with designing hex grid wargames, feeling that the hex pattern caused "fundamental shortcomings and limitations that I just couldn't overcome." Simmons waited more than twenty years before designing another game that would use an area map that produced long thin lines of armies, a look that became "the most important consideration in the design process." Simmons also wanted to design a much shorter game, ideally about 90 minutes in length. The result was Bonaparte at Marengo, designed by Rachel Simmons (credited as Bowen Simmons) with cover art from a painting by 19th-century French artist Auguste Raffet, and published by Simmons Games in 2005.

Simmons would use the same games system in developing the much larger games Napoleon's Triumph (2007) and The Guns of Gettysburg (2013).

== Reception ==
In Issue 263 of Computer Gaming World, Bruce Geryk wrote to his computer gaming audience, "If you remember what it felt like to line up hundreds of little cardboard chits and lose yourself in an imagined historical world (and if you have friends to play with), you absolutely cannot miss Simmons Games' Bonaparte at Marengo, which simulates the pre-Austerlitz French victory over the Austrians in a way tabletop gamers likely haven't seen before." Geryk liked the gameplay, saying, "The ingenious mechanics involve units in the form of long colored blocks, with simple, yet clever, positioning rules for ease of play, all while making the game took like an exhibit on the History Channel." Geryk also noted the simplicity of the rules, commenting that the game "plays simply and quickly enough that parents can play it with children who want to learn about history, yet the solid design provides a challenge for even the most experienced players." Geryk concluded, "With the current drought of good PC war games, it's surprising how far board games have come."

In Issue 27 of Simulacrum, John Kula, a player of hex grid wargames for 35 years, was dismissive of claims that the game was a new system, calling such claims "snake oil"; he saw it as simply a mish-mash of block wargaming from Quebec 1759, and thin rectangular blocks of wood and diceless combat from Diplomacy. "To give the designer [her] due, the creativity of Bonaparte at Marengo, where old elements are combined in new ways, is indisputable. But claiming them to be a new system is a bit ingenuous." Kula also was not a fan of the map divided into irregular areas, which he found confusing. Kula concluded by saying that he expected board wargames to "work a certain way", and the time spent learning a completely new system was time not spent playing the game. "Bonaparte at Marengo fails for me on these two accounts, especially as I get the sense that I wouldn’t end up playing it much. Your mileage may vary."

== Awards ==
Bonaparte at Merengo won a Charles S. Roberts Awards for "Best Pre-World War II Boardgame of 2005."
