= Source of the Nile (board game) =

1978 strategy board game

Source Of The Nile
- 1st edition cover, 1978
- Players: 1 or more
- Setup time: 15 minutes
- Playing time: 2 hours
- Chance: Medium
- Skills: Tactics, Strategy

Source of the Nile is a board game published by Discovery Games in 1978 that simulates the exploration of Africa in the 19th century. A second edition of the game was published by Avalon Hill in 1979.

== Description ==
Source of the Nile is a board game for 1–6 players in which the players take on the roles of 19th-century European explorers in Africa. The object of the game is to organize an expedition to Africa, make an important discovery, return to Europe to publish a report, then organize another expedition.

=== Components ===
The original Discovery Games edition had a color map, more than 400 counters, a deck of 48 Disaster cards and a 26-page rulebook.

=== Set up ===
Each player must choose a profession; the number of points a player gains for particular discoveries will vary depending on their choice:

- Zoologists get points for discovering animals.
- Botanists get points for discovering exotic plants.
- Missionaries get more points when dealing with natives.
- Geologists gain points for minerals.
- Doctors gain points for medicinal items.
- Journalists gain points for almost any encounter, even with other players.
- Ethnologists gain points for discovering native villages

Each explorer must outfit their expedition and choose a method of travel, be it by canoe, camel, or on foot.

=== Gameplay ===
At the outset of the game the hex grid map of the interior of Africa is blank. As explorers enter each unexplored hex, the terrain and events, if any, are determined randomly. Crayons are used to draw terrain on the map as it is discovered.

When an explorer makes a discovery, the explorer must return to Europe in order to publish a report. Once the report is published, the explorer scores points for it, and is free to raise funds in order to organize another expedition.

=== Death ===
The explorers must confront dangers such as starvation, disease, river cataracts and hostile natives. If an explorer has made a discovery and is returning to Europe when they die, the points for the discovery are not scored, since the explorer didn't publish a report. The hex where the dead explorer made their discovery is erased, and is available for another explorer to enter and make a different discovery. The following turn, the player whose explorer died creates a new one who re-enters the game at a coastal port.

=== Victory conditions ===
The player who accumulates the most points for published discoveries is the winner.

Avalon Hill edition, with cover art by Dale Sheaffer, 1979

== Publication history ==
Source of the Nile was created by Ross Maker and David Wesely, and published by Discovery Games in 1978. Later the same year, Discovery Games released an expansion to the game titled Source of the Nile: Tributary.

After the game won two Charles S. Roberts Awards, Avalon Hill acquired the game and revised the rules, replacing die rolls and charts with a deck of Chance cards, believing that this greatly improved the playability of the game. The original charts and rules were moved to an appendix in the rulebook. Avalon Hill released the new edition with cover art by Dale Sheaffer in 1979.

In 2003, Maker and Wesely reacquired the game rights and released a 25th anniversary edition of the game.

== Reception ==
In the November 1978 edition of Dragon (Issue 20), Gary Gygax called it a complex but "most enjoyable game".

In the 1980 book The Complete Book of Wargames, game designer Jon Freeman commented "This is not strictly a wargame: there are no battles. However, it is a historical simulation and one of the best in years. Each game is different, and the feel of the game depends wholly on the players, who battle not the other players but themselves and the elements." Freeman gave this game an Overall Evaluation of "Very Good", concluding, "It's a great deal of fun to play, and as a bonus it provides plenty of insight into a fascinating era."

== Awards ==
At the 1979 Origins Awards, Source of the Nile won two Charles S. Roberts Awards in the categories "Best Pre-20th Century Game of 1978" and "Best Amateur Game of 1978".

== Other reviews and commentary ==
- 1981 Games 100 in Games
