= Frédéric Bey =

French designer of wargames

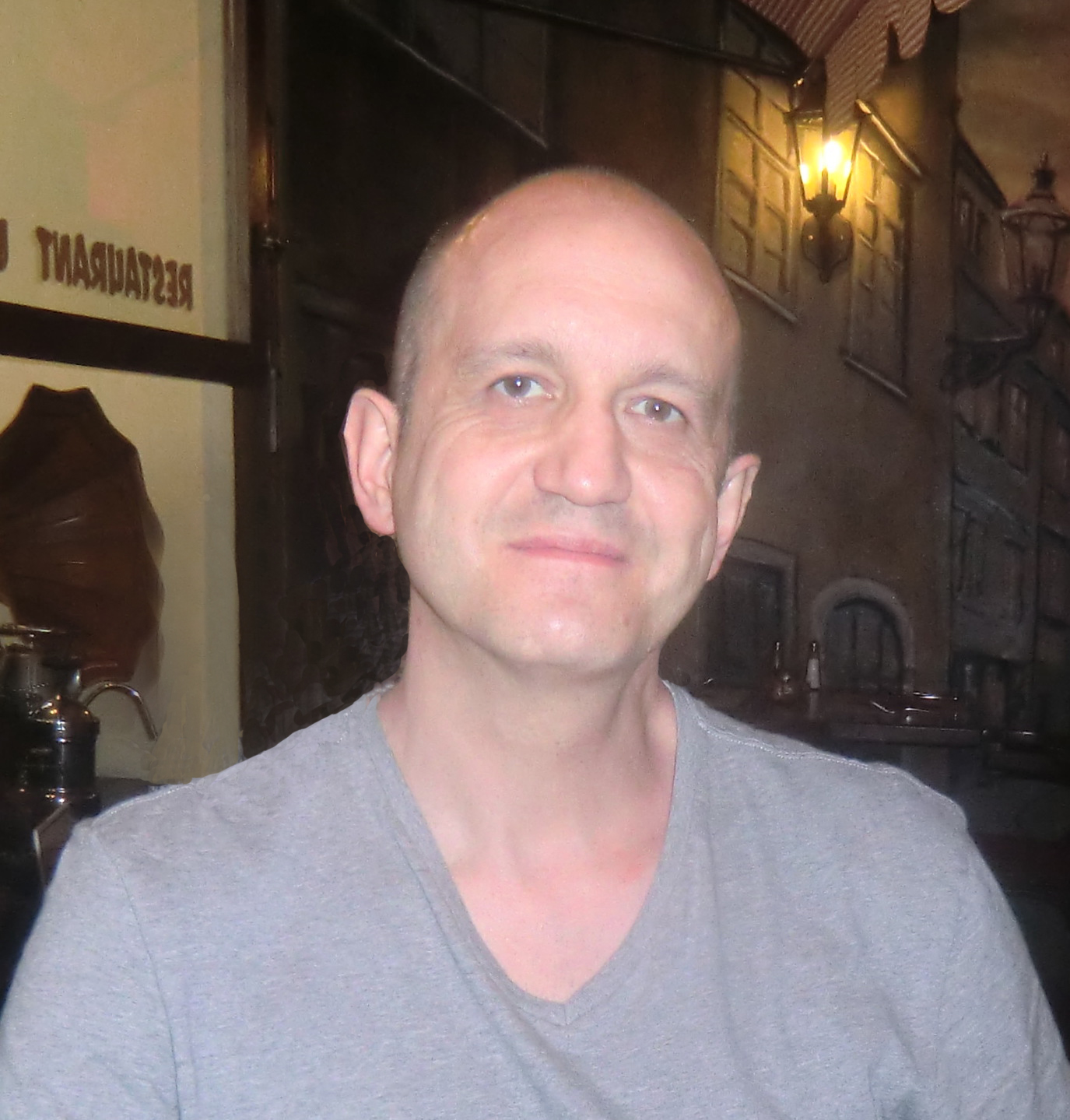
- Frédéric Bey in 2016
- Born: 20 April 1961 (age 65)
- Occupations: Military historian, writer

Frédéric Bey, born 20 April 1961 at Issy-les-Moulineaux in France, is a designer of wargames and the author of books and articles on the subject of military history.

== Biography ==
Frédéric Bey has done advanced studies on commerce and history. The wargames which he has designed cover ancient, medieval and Napoleonic military history. They have been published in Casus Belli and Vae Victis magazines as well as in several American magazines, such as C3i.

He is the organizer of the Trophée du Bicentenaire (Bicentennial Trophy), an annual international competition for wargaming whose objective is to commemorate the bicentennial of great victories of Napoleon.

A specialist in Napoleonic and Roman history, Bey is the author of a large number of articles on strategy in the ancient world and on the Napoleonic Wars which have appeared in Guerres & Histoire, De la guerre, La Revue Napoléon, Prétorien, Traditions, Histoires de France and Against the Odds magazines.

He has given many conferences on military history at the château de Vincennes under the auspices of the Centre d'Etudes d'Histoire de la Défense (CEHD), and has also been interviewed on France Inter (2000 Years of History) on the occasion of the bicentennial of the Battle of Austerlitz and at the Centre Culturel Irlandais de Paris in connection with a day celebrating Napoléon and Ireland.

An enthusiast of the Empire and strategy, Bey has published three books on the battles of Austerlitz, Jena, and Friedland for Quatuor Editions. He is also the co-writer of Infographie de l'empire napoléonien.

== Awards and recognition ==
Bey has received multiple nominations for Charles S. Roberts Awards, and was inducted to the Wargaming Hall of Fame in 2024.

== Selected works ==
=== Books ===
- Austerlitz, la victoire exemplaire, Editions Quatuor, 2005, 380 pages
- Iéna et Auerstaedt, la victoire foudroyante, Editions Quatuor, 2006, 271 pages
- Rome, la légion romaine au service de l'Empire, Histoire & Collections, 2007, 82 pages (ISBN 978-2352500087)
- Eylau et Friedland, la victoire avant tout, Editions Quatuor, 2008, 263 pages
- Alesia, The Victory of Roman Organisation, Histoire & Collections, 2011, 64 pages (ISBN 978-2352501237)
- Issos and Gaugamela, Alexander defeats and dethrones Darius III, 333-331 BC, Cérigo Editions, 2020, 48 pages (ISBN 978-2957079513)
- edited by Jean Lopez, La guerre antique, Éditions Perrin, 2021, 397 pages (ISBN 978-2-262-09684-7)
- edited by Jean Lopez, Les dix meilleures armées de l'Histoire: Des Assyriens à l'US Army, Éditions Perrin, Collection Tempus, 2022, 231 pages (ISBN 978-2262100216
- edited by Thierry Lentz and Jean Lopez, Les mythes de la Grande Armée, Éditions Perrin, 2022, 444 pages ISBN 978-2262100742
- with Vincent Haegele and Nicolas Guillerat, Infographie de l'empire napoléonien, Passés/Composés, 2023, 160 pages ISBN 978-2379330865
- Alésia, le triomphe de l'organisation romaine (second edition), Histoire & Collections, 2023, 64 pages (ISBN 979-1038013742)
- edited by Jean Lopez, La guerre antique, Éditions Perrin, Collection Tempus, 2024, 576 pages (ISBN 978-2262106331)
- edited by Thierry Lentz and Jean Lopez, Les mythes de la Grande Armée, Éditions Perrin, Collection Tempus, 2024, 422 pages ISBN 978-2262111205

=== Articles ===
Bey is a regular contributor to the historical magazines Guerres & Histoire, Histoires de France, La Revue Napoléon and Prétorien and the wargaming magazines Casus Belli, Vae Victis, C3i and Against the Odds.

=== Wargames ===
Frédéric Bey has designed more than 70 wargames:

- Bellum Gallicum / Casus Belli No. 68 and No. 69 / 1992 (Note: with Marc Brandsma)
- Rivoli 1797 / Vae Victis No. 18 / 1997
- Denain 1712 / Vae Victis No. 20 / 1998 (Note: with Sylvain Fereira)
- Alesia 52 BC / Vae Victis No. 21 / 1998
- Pyramids 1798 / Vae Victis No. 23 / 1998
- Poitiers 1356 and Formigny 1450 / Vae Victis No. 26 / 1999
- Zurich 1799 / Vae Victis No. 29 / 1999
- Suffren of The Indies / Vae Victis No. 34 / 2000
- Marengo 1800 / Vae Victis No. 35 / 2000
- Jours de Gloire Campaign I : The Danub (Hohenlinden 1800, Austerlitz 1805, Wagram 1809) / Vae Victis No. 41 / 2001
- Canope 1801 / Canons en Cartons / 2001
- Imperator 161–217 A.D. / Vae Victis No. 42 / 2001
- By the Edge of the Sword (Bouvines 1214 and Benevento 1266) / Vae Victis No. 45 / 2002
- Montebello 1800 / Canons en Cartons / 2002
- Jours de Gloire Campaign II : Poland (Pultusk 1806, Eylau and Friedland 1807, Poland 1812–1813) / Vae Victis No. 47 / 2002
- Lonato 1796 / T&G module / C3i No. 14 / 2002
- Plutôt mort que Perse (Persian Wars, 492–479 BC) / Vae Victis No. 49 / 2003 (Note: with Nicolas Stratigos)
- Jours de Gloire Campaign III : France (Valmy 1792, France 1814) / Vae Victis No. 52 / 2003
- Sword of France (Auray and Cocherel 1364, Patay 1429, Castillon 1453) / Canons en Carton / 2003
- Semper Victor 305–374 A.D. / Vae Victis No. 56 / 2004
- Austerlitz 1805 (sud) / Vae Victis No. 58 / 2004
- Haslach and Elchingen 1805 / Canons en Carton / 2004
- The Cross and the Sword (Las Navas de Tolosa 1212) / Vae Victis No. 62 / 2005
- Austerlitz 1805 (North) / Vae Victis No. 64 / 2005
- Alésia 52 BC, Jurassian Hypothesis / Canons en Carton / 2005
- Dürrenstein and Schöngraben 1805 / Canons en Carton / 2005
- Trojan War / Vae Victis No. 66 / 2006
- Royal Swords (Brémule 1119, Taillebourg 1242, Mons-en-Pévèle 1304, Cassel 1328) / Canons en Carton / 2006
- Jena 1806 / Vae Victis No. 71 / 2006
- Maïda and Castel Nuovo 1805 / Canons en Carton / 2006* Schleiz, Saalfeld and Auerstaedt 1806 / Canons en Carton / 2007
- Ultimus Romanorum / Vae Victis No. 74 / 2007 (Note: with Jean-Philippe Gury)
- Swords and Crown (Varey 1325, Baugé 1421, Verneuil 1424, Montlhéry 1465) / Canons en Carton / 2007
- Eylau 1807 / Vae Victis No. 77 / 2007
- Friedland 1807 / Canons en Carton / 2007
- Swords and Halberds (Morgarten 1315, Sempach 1386 and Grandson 1476) / Vae Victis No. 81 / 2008
- Borkowo 1806 / Vae Victis Hors-série No.10 / 2008
- Norman Swords (Val ès dunes 1057, Varaville 1057 et Hastings 1066 / Canons en Carton / 2009
- Medina de Rioseco and Somosierra 1808 / Vae Victis No. 83 / 2008
- Roliça and Vimeiro 1808 / Canons en Carton / 2008
- Epées Normandes (Val ès dunes 1057, Varaville 1057 et Hastings 1066 / Canons en Carton / 2009
- Aspern-Essling 1809 / Vae Victis Collection Jeux d'Histoire / 2009* Gospitch and Ocaña 1809 / Canons en Carton / 2010* The Lion and the Sword (Tremetousia and Arsuf 1191) / Vae Victis Collection Jeux d'Histoire / 2010
- Sphactera 425 BC / Vae Victis No. 95 / 2010
- Almeida and Bussaco 1810 / Hexasim – Canons en Carton / 2010
- Germany 1813: from Lützen to Leipzig / Hexasim – Canons en Carton / 2011
- Fuentes de Oñoro, Foz d'Arouce and El Bodón 1811 / Vae Victis Collection Jeux d'Histoire / 2011 (ASIN 2352502330, , )
- Syracuse, 415-413 B.C. / Vae Victis No. 103 (Special Wargame Edition) / 2012
- Sword of Sovereignty (Bouvines 1214 and Worringen 1288) / Ludifolie Editions - Canons en Carton / 2012
- The Bérézina 1812 - Battles for the Bridges / Ludifolie Editions - Canons en Carton / 2012
- Bellum Gallicum II / Vae Victis Wargame Collection / 2012
- Alea Iacta Est, The Death of The Republic (49 to 29 B.C.) / Ludifolie Editions - Canons en Carton / 2013
- Hanau 1813 - The Heroïc Charge / Vae Victis Wargame Collection / 2013
- The Dauphin and the Sword (Bastille de Dieppe 1443, Saint-Jacques-sur-la-Brise 1444 and Montlhéry 1465) / Ludifolie Editions / 2014
- The Truce or the Sword (Ford of Blanquetaque 1475 and Guinegatte 1479) / Ludifolie Editions / 2014
- Amphipolis, 424-422 B.C. / Vae Victis No. 119 (Special Wargame Edition) / 2014
- Montmirail and Vauchamps 1814 - The Guard Leads the Attack / Ludifolie Editions - Canons en Carton / 2014
- Les Quatre-Bras and Waterloo 1815 - The Empire's Final Blows / Ludifolie Editions - Canons en Carton / 2015
- Arcole 1796 / Vae Victis Wargame Collection - Cérigo Editions / 2016
- Ligny and Wavre 1815 - The Empire's Last Victories / Ludifolie Editions - Canons en Carton / 2016
- Early Glories, Rivoli 1797 – Zürich 1799 – Montebello 1800 – Marengo 1800 / Vae Victis Collection Jeux d'Histoire - Cérigo Editions / 2017
- Hellespont, 411-410 B.C. / Vae Victis No. 139 (Special Wargame Edition) / 2018
- Heroes & Kings (Val ès dunes 1047, Taillebourg 1242, Cocherel 1364 and Patay 1429) / Vae Victis Collection Jeux d'Histoire - Cérigo Editions / 2018
- Sfacteria 425 A.C. / Si Vis Pacem Para Bellum No. IV / 2018
- Issy 1815 / C3i No. 32 / 2018
- Blenheim 1704 AD / Turning Point Simulations / 2019
- Alexander against Persia, 334-331 BC - Granicus, Issos and Gaugamela / Vae Victis Collection Jeux d'Histoire - Cérigo Editions / 2019
- Three Days of Glory, Elchingen 1805 - Hollabrunn 1805 - Austerlitz 1805 / Vae Victis Collection Jeux d'Histoire - Cérigo Editions / 2021
- Les Quatre-Bras and Waterloo 1815 - The Empire's Final Blows (second edition) / Ludifolie Editions - Canons en Carton / 2021
- La Garde avance! Waterloo 1815: The Last Square / Vae Victis No. 161 (Special Wargame Edition) / 2022
- Early Glories, Rivoli 1797 – Zürich 1799 – Montebello 1800 – Marengo 1800 (second edition) / Vae Victis Collection Jeux d'Histoire - Cérigo Editions / 2022
- Aspern-Essling 1809 (second edition) / Vae Victis Collection Jeux d'Histoire - Cérigo Editions / 2022
- Nabis, The Last Spartan 195 BC / Vae Victis No. 167 (Special Wargame Edition) / 2023
- Two Years of Glory, Jena and Auerstedt 1806 - Eylau and Friedland 1807 / Vae Victis Collection Jeux d'Histoire - Cérigo Editions / 2024
- La Garde veille! Eylau 1807 / Vae Victis No. 178 (Special Wargame Edition) / 2025

Collaborations:
