= Empires of the Middle Ages =

Strategy board game released in 1980

- Cover of SPI edition, 1980
- Designers: Jim Dunnigan
- Illustrators: Redmond A. Simonsen
- Publishers: SPI
- Publication: 1980
- Genres: Medieval Europe

Empires of the Middle Ages, subtitled "A Dynamic Simulation of Medieval Europe, 771–1467", is a historical board game published by Simulations Publications, Inc. (SPI) in 1980 that simulates grand strategy and diplomacy in the Middle Ages.

== Description ==
Empires of the Middle Ages is a board game for 2–6 players, each of whom controls an empire in medieval Europe between 771 and 1467. Each empire is composed of various areas that are rated for wealth, religion, language and population.

=== Components ===
The SPI edition game box holds:

- a two-piece map of Europe and Asia Minor
- 56 Year cards
- 56 Event cards (The 2nd edition published by Decision Games included an additional 107 Event cards)
- various charts and tables
- six sets of 100 colored counters
- rules booklet

=== Gameplay ===
The object of the game is to create and grow an empire in terms of wealth, geography and stability.

==== Round ====
Each Round represents five years of game time. To begin a round, the Year cards are shuffled, and each player receives five facedown. Players are not allowed to look at them. Player order for the Round is determined by leader stature rating and number of areas controlled, with the highest rated player choosing when they wish to play during that Round (first, second, last, etc.). Once a player order has been determined, the active player

- draws an Event card, which they turn face up and apply the result. The exception is a Hold card, which the player can either use or keep for the future.
- undertakes at least one endeavor. This may include conquest, pillaging, fortification, ruling, and diplomacy. If an endeavor involves another player's area, the second player may announce a defensive endeavor. The active player turns over a Year card and applies the results to their endeavor. (If there is a defending player, that player also turns up a Year card and applies the result.)
- collect Gold from areas within their Empire
- decide to continue with more endeavors, each of which will use a Year card, or end their turn, saving Year cards for possible defensive needs.

Once all player have had a turn, the next Round is played.

==== Game Turn ====
Five Rounds (representing 25 years of game time) is a Game Turn.

=== Scenarios and campaign game ===
A number of short scenarios (ranging from four to eight Game Turns equalling one to two centuries) are included as a means to learn the rules. Once players are familiar with the rules, they can play the entire campaign from the year 770 (the accession of Charlemagne) to 1475.

== Publication history ==
Empires of the Middle Ages was designed by James Dunnigan and developed by Anthony F. Buccini and Redmond A. Simonsen. Simonsen also developed the graphic design of the game.

Dunnigan had originally conceived of it as a computer game, but in 1980, he felt there was not yet a suitable, inexpensive and widely distributed home computer, so his design became a board game.

The game proved popular, and after its release in early 1980, remained near the top of SPI's Top Ten bestseller list for the rest of the year.

SPI published a thematic sequel game of empire building that used a modified set of the same rules, albeit set in a distant future, titled The Sword and the Stars.

After the demise of SPI, Caledon Software Designs created a DOS computer version of the board game for 1–8 players, published in 1994 under the title Rise of the West.

Decision Games acquired the rights to the board game after a revision by Ty Bomba, released a second edition with additional Event cards in 2004.

== Reception ==
In Issue 48 of the British wargaming magazine Perfidious Albion, Charles Vasey commented, "this has the makings of a corker of a game. The map is functional, the rules quite well written (it is all there, but you must rigorously observe the rules of SPI writing) and the problems and events both interesting and challenging." However, Vasey questioned the historicity of some of the rules, feeling that the Crusades in this game "bear little resemblance to those noble campaigns", and various raiders (Magyars, Saracens and Vikings) "are pretty pathetic and go neither as far, nor as powerfully as the real ones." Vasey also questioned the lack of the Holy Church, noting, "the Middle Ages without the Pope [is] like World War II without the Germans." Vasey concluded, "The game will teach you some interesting things, and it will open vistas in the Middle Ages that lie hidden to most people. It's not a good historical simulation but it's a hell of a good historical-political simulation."

In Issue 33 of Phoenix, Roger Sandell felt that the main problem of this game was that "it gives little sense of the historical changes taking place in the period it depicts." He also noted that the game didn't "take much account of differing styles of government from country to country." Despite this, Sandell felt that "As a whole the game plays well. It moves reasonably quickly and the eternal problems that beset each nation mean that it is not simply a game of attempting to conquer everything in sight." He did note that there were periods where there was little player interaction. He concluded, "to some extent, an attempt has been made to put too much into one package and one set of rules and that the game might have benefited from attempting to look at a more restricted area, either historically or geographically."

In Issue 23 of Fire & Movement, Rob Land commented, "The game plays well and has been completently play-tested. [It] seems to have something for everyone who ever wanted to act like a king." Land concluded, "It has many good features which you will enjoy discovering yourself. This is the kind of product the hobby expects from SPI: original in conception and workable in execution."

In Issue 54 of Moves, Charles Vasey thought that "The total effect of [the game] is good. It must inevitably fail to simulate so complex a subject as the history of nations, but it comes very close."

In Issue 13 of Paper Wars, Scott McCannell thought that "Aside from the sometimes ambiguous rules, [the game] has few flaws, and the ambiguities are easily corrected by adopting house rules. EotMA has a high replay value."

In Slingshot, John Graham-Leigh reviewed the second edition published by Decision Games, and noted that everything was bigger – the maps, the number of counters, even the number of Event cards. But Graham-Leigh was disappointed with the rulebook, which was simply a reprint of the 1st edition rules with a separate supplement for new rules, leaving old and in some cases superseded rules in place. He called this "a very lazy way to do it, and results in a lot of referring back and forth." However, he concluded that "Overall, the game looks to be a genuine improvement on the original. It will best suit players who have a good deal of patience and a fair amount of time available for playing, plus some knowledge of the history and an ability to laugh at misfortune."

In a retrospective review in Issue 3 of SPI's edition of Simulacrum, John Kula noted that designer Jim Dunnigan had originally conceived of this as a computer game. "This may explain why there is so much detail in the game, inconsequential detail to a computer but mind-numbing detail for humans, especially the first-time players who may not expect it from such an apparently simple game."

Several years later, in Simulacrum #25, Kula wrote a scathing review of the second edition published by Decision Games, saying, "The second edition comes across from beginning to end as an email from Nigeria, nothing more than an attempt to cash in on the financial success of the first edition in the current marketplace, a game unencumbered by any extenuating circumstances. Decision Games could do better than this. Much, much better."

Empires of the Middle Ages was chosen for inclusion in the 2007 book Hobby Games: The 100 Best. Game designer Timothy Brown commented, "The game stands out for its innovative balance of mechanics and graphics, guaranteeing an enjoyable session every time."

== Awards ==
At the 1979 Origins Awards, Empires of the Middle Ages won the Charles S. Roberts Award for "Best Pre-20th Century Game of 1980".
