= Tac Air =

Board wargame

Cover art by George Parrish, 1987

Tac Air is a board wargame published by Avalon Hill in 1987 that is based on a wargame originally developed for the US Navy.

== Description ==
Created during the Cold War, Tac Air is a two-player wargame that hypothesizes that the Cold War has gone hot and Warsaw Pact forces have invaded southern Germany in the area of the Main River between Bamberg and Bayreuth. The game simulates NATO's attempts to blunt the invasion using a combination of ground forces and tactical air support.

=== Components ===
The game contains:

- Two-piece 22" x 32" mounted map scaled at 1 nautical mile (1852 m/2025 yd) per hex. Some scenarios only use half of the map board.
- More than 500 die-cut counters
- Basic rulebook
- Advanced rulebook
- Various game aids and charts
- Two six-sided dice

=== Gameplay ===
The game includes twelve scenarios:

- Five scenarios using only the Basic rules.
- Seven scenarios using an increasing number of Advanced and Optional Advanced rules.

== Publication history ==
In the 1980s, the Research and Studies for the Office of Net Assessment (OSD/NA) of the US Department of Defense developed a number of wargames to be used at Maneuver Combat Training Centers (MCTC). Several of these wargames were subsequently sold to companies, which developed them as commercial products. One of these, FEBA (Forward Edge of Battle Area), a wargame developed by Major Mark Thibodeau, Captain Matt Cathay, and Captain Wayne Close, was sold to Avalon Hill. The game was retitled Tac Air, revised, and adapted for commercial release by former USAF pilot Gary C. "Mo" Morgan, with rules development by S. Craig Taylor, cartography and graphics by Charles Kibler, and box art by George Parrish. Avalon Hill published Tac Air in 1987.

== Reception ==
Ellis Simpson reviewed Tac-Air for Games International magazine, and gave it 3 1/2 stars out of 5, and stated that "Tac-Air may be something of a missed opportunity in the realism stakes, but it is a good game. with the information available, it would only take a minute's tinkering, at little cost to playability to address some of the realism issues."

== Reviews ==
- Fire & Movement #68
- Casus Belli #47

== Awards ==
Tac Air won the Charles S. Roberts Award for "Best Post–World War Two or Modern Game of 1988", and was a finalist for "Best Wargaming Graphics of 1988".

== Other recognition ==
A copy of Tac Air is held in the collection of the Strong National Museum of Play (object 112.6787).
