= Ironbottom Sound (board game) =

Naval board wargame

- 1981 edition with cover art by Bill Haggart
- Designers: Jack Greene
- Illustrators: Bill Haggart; Rodger B. MacGowan
- Publishers: Quarterdeck Games; Moments in History
- Publication: 1981
- Genres: World War II naval combat

Ironbottom Sound, subtitled "The Guadalcanal Campaign", is a naval board wargame published by in 1981 that simulates the Naval Battle of Guadalcanal during World War II. Four editions have been released by various publishers over forty years.

== Background ==
In August 1942, American forces landed on Guadalcanal, their first major land offensive against the Empire of Japan. Over the next few months, Japan tried to counterattack, their offensive culminating in a series of naval engagements in November 1942. So many ships were sunk during these actions that the Americans nicknamed the stretch of water "Ironbottom Sound".

== Description ==
Ironbottom Sound is a two-player board wargame that simulates several historic naval actions near Guadalcanal.

=== Components ===
The first edition game box contains:

- paper hex grid sheet, including a separate cut-out of Savo Island that can be added to the map for several scenarios
- 260 counters
- ship diagrams/log sheets
- rulebook

=== Gameplay ===
Ten scenarios are included in the first edition. Five cover various actions during the Guadalcanal campaign, and five offer balanced scenarios for tournament use. On each turn, players plot ship movement in advance, as well as torpedo movement. Each ship has three maximum speeds for Turns 1, 2, and 3. Changing direction by 1 hex facing (60 degrees) has no movement cost; changing direction by two hex facings (120 degrees) uses an extra movement point.

Movement is then made simultaneously. Gunfire is also made simultaneously, and if a torpedo enters a ship's hex, a die roll is made to see if the torpedo makes contact.

=== Victory conditions ===
Each scenario has different victory conditions. For example, in Scenario #10 "Savo Island", the Japanese win a tactical victory by sinking two American ships and safely exiting the board, and gain a strategic victory by crossing the board to sink Marine transports before recrossing the board to exit where they entered. The Americans win by preventing these conditions.

Hobby Japan edition using artwork of Rodger B. MacGowan. Several later editions also used the same artwork.

== Publication history ==
In 1978, game designer Jack Greene created an updated edition of Avalon Hill's 1962 naval wargame Bismarck. The following year, Greene created a new naval wargame, Destroyer Captain, published by Quarterdeck Games.

In 1981, Greene designed Ironbottom Sound, published in a flat box by Quarterdeck Games with cover art by Bill Haggart. The following year, Hobby Japan published a Japanese edition in a bookcase box with cover art by Rodger MacGowan.

In the 1990s, Greene revised the game, adding rules for night actions, and the second edition, Iron Bottom Sound II, was published by Moments in History in 1998 using the same MacGowan artwork.

Jack Greene extensively revised the rules again, added new scenarios — including one English Channel action between the British and Germans — and released Iron Bottom Sound III as a bilingual English/Japanese edition in 2015, published by K2 Publishing using MacGowan's cover art again.

In 2021, Kilovolt Designs released a fourth edition in Simplified Chinese ("铁底湾的回响").

== Reception ==
In Issue 36 of Phoenix, John Lambshead had quibbles with the visibility rules, which should favor the Japanese but are largely irrelevant since "both [players] can 'see' supposedly undetected ships on the map and maneuver accordingly." However, he liked the hidden torpedo movement, and the quick results from weapon fire. Overall, Lambshead thought this was a must-buy for naval combat fans, saying, "It's a specialised game for a specialised market. So if you're after an upmarket gun and armour naval game then this is worth consideration, but perhaps not for the casual buyer."

In The Wargamer, Chip Hanika found the combat exciting, saying, "Tactically, and this is the fun part, while positioning can be crucial, what really counts is just plain blowing the enemy to hell. Fire, fire, and keep firing is the order of the day. Consequently, tension and excitement keep building as dice rolls decide hits, damage, and consequences in myriad combinations and modifications thereof." Hanika concluded, "Tactically wild, strategically unforgiving, in toto, a fascinating and enthralling game. Don't miss it."

== Awards ==
- At the 1982 Origins Awards, the first edition of Ironbottom Sound won the Charles S. Roberts Award for "Best Initial Release of a Board Game of 1981".
- At the 1990 Origins Awards, Ironbottom Sound designer Jack Greene was inducted into the Charles Roberts Awards Hall of Fame for his contributions to the world of naval wargaming.

== Other reviews ==
- Fire & Movement #28
- Grenadier #13
- Adventure Gaming #5
