= To the Green Fields Beyond (game) =

1978 WWI board wargame

- Cover of the original SPI edition, 1978
- Designers: David Isby
- Illustrators: Redmond A. Simonsen
- Publishers: SPI
- Publication: 1978
- Genres: WW1

To the Green Fields Beyond, subtitled "The Battle of Cambrai, 1917" is a board wargame published by Simulations Publications, Inc. in 1978 that simulates the appearance of tanks for the first time during the First World War.

== Background ==
On 20 November 1917, the British attacked the German trenches of the Hindenberg Line, using the newly invented tank as a spearpoint. In words attributed to the first commander of the British Tanks Corps, Brigadier General Hugh Elles, the Allies hoped that the tanks would lead them "Through the mud and the blood to the green fields beyond". The attack went well at first, but then faltered on the second day as the Allies tried to advance on the strongpoint of Bourlon Woods. A strong German counterattack on 29 November forced the Allies back to the line they had gained on the first day of the battle.

== Description ==
To the Green Fields Beyond is a two-player wargame at the operational level that simulates the Battle of Cambrai.

=== Components ===
The game, judged to be "somewhat complex", comes with:

- rulebook
- 400 die-cut counters
- 34" x 22" hex grid map scaled at 1250 meters per hex
- six-sided die

=== Gameplay ===
The game uses an alternating series of turns, starting with the British player, who has the following phases:

1. Administration and Reinforcement
2. 1st Barrage
3. 1st Combat
4. 1st Move
5. 2nd Barrage
6. 2nd Combat
7. 2nd Move

The German player gets the same opportunity, completing one full Game Turn, which is the equivalent of 24 hours of the battle.

Many wargames have their units move first and then fight, meaning units can move adjacent to an enemy unit and attack in the same turn. Critic Danny Holte points out that by reversing the Movement and Combat phases, it means that a player can, as part of their second Movement phase, pull their units back to ensure that none of their units are adjacent to an enemy unit. Since a unit can't attack unless it is immediately adjacent to an enemy unit, this would mean that on the other player's next turn, their units would have no attacks during their first Combat Phase.

If a unit has participated in combat, it cannot move in the Movement Phase that immediately follows.

=== Barrages ===
Since artillery played such an important part on the Western Front, there are six different types of barrages a player can choose from during their Barrage Phases: Drumfire, Rolling, Direct Support, S.O.S., Interdiction, and Hurricane.

=== Disruption ===
If a unit is disrupted, it cannot recover unless it is pulled from the front line.

=== Scenarios ===
The game has three scenarios:

1. "The British Breakthrough" (20–22 November)
2. "Battle of Bourlon" (23–27 November)
3. "German Counter-Attack (30 November – 4 December)

All three scenarios can be joined together into a single 17-turn campaign, with a single turn encompassing one day of game time.

== Publication history ==
To the Green Fields Beyond was designed by David Isby, and features art and cartography by Redmond Simonsen. Although wargames based on World War I had not been popular to this point in time, To the Green Fields Beyond proved to be a surprise hit, with pre-orders alone pushing it to #7 on the SPI Top 10 Bestseller list six months before it was released. When it was published in June 1978, it rose another spot to #6.

In the 1990s, Decision Games acquired the license and published a revised second edition with streamlined rules. In 2004, Excalibre Games acquired the license and republished SPI's original game.

== Reception ==
In Issue 18 of Phoenix, Donald Mack called the rules system "unique" and particularly well-suited to trench warfare. But his major problem with the game was the length of time needed to complete even one of the small scenarios. He pointed out that the rulebook suggests each turn should take 30–75 minutes to play; he found that this was a gross underestimation — in his playtest, each player took 1–2 hours to complete their portion of a turn, making the length of a complete turn between 2 and 4 hours. "In consequence, the game consists of bouts of hard work, especially if one is on the offensive, alternating with upwards of an hour of either gazing at the ceiling or roaming around the room looking for something to read." He concluded on an ambiguous note, saying, "[Designer David Isby] has devised a clever play-system to suggest the 'feel' of trench warfare in 1917 [...] [but] To the Green Fields Beyond is as ponderous as one of the Mark IV tanks which inspired it. [...] it can be recommended only to the enthusiast who really, sincerely, wants to see how Cambrai works out in game terms."

In Issue 19 of Phoenix, Andrew McGee found major deficiencies in the rules around supply lines, and after examining them in depth, suggested a large number of substantive changes be made.

In the 1980 book The Complete Book of Wargames, game designer Jon Freeman commented, "There is a wealth of detail here. The artillery rules, appropriately, are marvelous, and the tanks are at once a source of elation and frustration for the British player. The situation is a good one, with both players getting a chance to attack and defend." Freeman noted the size of the game, saying, "The sheer number of counters predictably slows the game, but play moves along fairly steadily except for periodic flurries of die-rolling." Freeman concluded by the giving the game an Overall Evaluation of "Good to Very Good."

In a retrospective review in Issue 7 of Simulacrum written more than twenty years after the game's publication, Danny Holte called the Battle of Cambrai "A fascinating topic, and one which David Isby and SPI would use as the basis for a masterpiece of a game." Holte especially liked the organization of rules, commenting "The outstanding rulebook is neatly organized and easy to digest, making a somewhat complex game rather easy to learn, if not to master." Holte noted that "The game has some interesting rules and new gaming concepts which, while somewhat confusing at first, combine to accurately simulate WWI warfare as not many games have done before or since." Holte concluded that To the Green Fields Beyond was "a tense, exciting game requiring planning, execution and sometimes a little gamble."

== Awards ==
At the 1979 Origins Awards, To the Green Fields Beyond was awarded the Charles S. Roberts Award for "Best Twentieth Century Game of 1978".

== Other reviews and commentary ==
- Moves #41
- Fire & Movement #13
- The Wargamer Vol.1 #8 and Vol.2 #23
- Paper Wars #10
