= Joseph Miranda (game designer) =

American game designer

- Occupation: Game designer

Joseph Miranda is an American game designer who has worked primarily on board games.

== Career ==
Joseph Miranda is the editor of Strategy & Tactics magazine and has designed over 100 published wargames. Miranda has also worked for various computer game design firms including HPS Simulations and Hexagon Interactive. He is a former U.S. Army officer who has taught unconventional warfare topics at the JFK Special Warfare Center, and more recently has developed courses in terrorism and Middle Eastern conflict for Chapman University. He has been a featured speaker at the USAF Connections simulations conference, the Military Operations Research Society, and the Origins national wargaming convention.
