= Barbarian Prince =

Board game

Barbarian Prince is a solitaire board game published by the Dwarfstar Games line of Heritage Models in 1981.

== Gameplay ==
Barbarian Prince is a game in which the player is the barbarian prince Cal Arath, who must regain his birthright from usurpers who killed his father and took over his throne.

In order to win the game, the player must accumulate 500 gold pieces in 70 days or less in order to finance the counter-coup that will regain the prince his throne. Each game-turn represents one day, and during that time, the prince can move one hex on foot or two hexes if mounted (or even three hexes if on a river raft or a pegasus). Every time he enters a new hex, the player generates a random event, which may be beneficial or of no consequence, but often involves encounters that can only be resolved with combat. The prince can also try a number of various actions each turn to generate money such as seeking news, hiring followers, searching ruins, or gaining an audience with the local ruler.

The game components are: a map of the region; an unpainted 25 mm figurine of the prince, two 6-sided dice, two pages of charts and tables, a 24-page rule book and a 48-page event book.

== Reception ==
In the October 1981 edition of Dragon, Glenn Rahman called it "the most satisfactory solo game that this writer has seen to date." Rahman lauded the rules that "were simple to learn", and he liked the fact that the protagonist, Cal Arath, is already a formidable fighter. He concluded with a positive recommendation, saying, "This writer gives Barbarian Prince four gold stars. If you are a sword and sorcery buff who doesn’t have the opportunity to take part in a multi-player adventure — or even if you do -this is one game you ought to check out."

In the January 1982 edition of Ares (Issue 12), Steve List thought the game had few problems, although he found a few procedures that were "cumbersome". He also noted that combat required rolling dice many times; given that the game was 70 turn/days long, "one can get quickly bored with rolling dice and looking up events in a booklet." List did question the game balance: "The prince has a hard time winning, often because he has too many fights before he can recruit some followers." List recommended the game to players who like solo games as opposed to conventional multi-player games.

In the January 1982 edition of The Space Gamer (Issue No. 47), Tony Watson commented that "Barbarian Prince's good points far outweigh the bad. It's a well-structured and interesting game, and challenging play for the gamer who has no opponent and is seeking a few hours' diversion."

Bill Skirrow reviewed Barbarian Prince for White Dwarf #29, giving it an overall rating of 8 out of 10, and stated that "All in all, Barbarian Prince is a colourful and absorbing game that, unlike many solitaire games, does not get bogged down in the mechanics of play."

In a retrospective review of Barbarian Prince in Black Gate, John ONeill said "You can't win at Barbarian Prince. The game is an existential commentary on the nihilistic underpinnings of modern evolutionary thought. I thought that was obvious. All games end in ignoble death, usually in the form of a starving goblin tribe that beats you to a pulp and steals your fur-lined booties."

== Awards ==
Barbarian Prince was awarded the Charles S. Roberts Award for "Best Fantasy Boardgame of 1981".

== Reviews ==
- Jeux & Stratégie #19
- Isaac Asimov's Science Fiction Magazine v12 n1 (1988 01)
- Analog Science Fiction and Fact
