= A House Divided (board game) =

American Civil War tabletop wargame

The American Civil War, 1861-1865
- First edition box cover by Frank Chadwick, 1981
- Other names: A House Divided: War Between the States 1861-65
- Designers: Frank Chadwick
- Publishers: Game Designers Workshop 1981, 1989; Phalanx Games B.V 2001; Mayfair Games 2012
- Publication: 1981; 44 years ago
- Genres: American Civil War board wargame

A House Divided is a strategic level board wargame set in the American Civil War for two players, featuring point-to-point movement, low-complexity rules, and relatively few counters to maneuver. It was designed by Frank Chadwick and published in 1981 by Game Designers Workshop (GDW).

== Gameplay ==
A House Divided owes much of its popularity to its relatively simple rules, with more advanced rules for experienced players, and features a playing board covering most of the United States mainland. Play is turnbased, and the players play the Union and Confederacy armies respectively. The game is played over a series of up to 40 game turns, each game turn being divided in two player turns. The Union player has the first player turn every turn. The first game turn is July 1861, and the game culminates in June 1865.

The pieces represent infantry and cavalry units, each unit containing from 10,000 to 15,000 infantry or from 7,000 to 10,000 cavalry. Each game turn represents one or two months, depending on the time of year. In all versions, the pieces are represented with three ranks; Militia, Veteran and Crack. All new units are Militia units, and promotions happen at the end of victorious battle, as well as during the promotion phase of a players turn. No unit may be promoted twice in any single player turn, i.e.; if a unit has gotten a battlefield (post-combat) promotion, it may not receive a regular promotion in the same player turn.

The map comprises the eastern United States, and contains boxes for each city, as well as roads, railroads and rivers.

The turns comprise four phases, conducted in this exact order:

1. Movement
2. Combat
3. Promotions
4. Recruitment

There is no stacking limit, and players are free to inspect their opponent's forces at any time. In the advanced game, there is a combat limit in each combat round of 8 units. The original game included a short-game, in addition to the full game, where only the first two rounds are played. In later versions, rules are included for shorter campaigns starting in 1862, 1863 and 1864.

=== Victory ===
In the long-game, the Union player wins when and if he controls all Confederacy cities with a recruitment value of 2 and 3, these being New Orleans, Charleston, Mobile, Wilmington, Richmond, Atlanta and Memphis. When the last of these cities has been captured, play stops immediately, and the Union player has won. The Confederacy player wins if he does one out of three:

1. Captures Washington (immediate victory)
2. Captures enough recruitment cities to make the Confederacy Army Maximum greater than the Union Army Maximum (immediate victory)
3. Avoids a Union victory (victory at the end of the game)

== History ==
There have been four editions, the first and second published by GDW in 1981 and 1989, a third edition by Phalanx Games B.V in 2001, and a fourth edition in 2012, published by Mayfair Games.

The changes between the first and second edition were few, notably, some rules were changed, some new optional rules were added, and also the map came as four puzzle-like pieces, instead of as one large, foldable map, as in the first edition. In addition, some piece designs were altered and enlarged.

The second edition was edited by Alan Emrich. At his website there is more about his thoughts on the game, as well as his "living" version of rules edition 3.1, which is based on changes he'd like to see.

The third edition adopted a foldable cardboard plate as seen in other games, such as Axis & Allies, and also featured a brand new design for the pieces. The rules, however, remain virtually unchanged from the second edition.

== Background ==
The name of the game refers to Lincoln's "A House Divided" speech, where Lincoln said:

"A house divided against itself cannot stand.
I believe this government cannot endure permanently half slave and half free.
I do not expect the Union to be dissolved – I do not expect the house to fall – but I do expect it to cease to be divided.
It will become all one thing, or all the other.
Either the opponents of slavery will arrest the further spread of it, and place it where the public mind shall rest in the belief that it is in the course of ultimate extinction; or its advocates will push it forward, until it shall become alike lawful in all states, old as well as new, North as well as South."

== Reception ==
In the September 1981 edition of Dragon (Issue 53), Bill Fawcett lauded the innovative movement system that eschewed the traditional hex-grid. He also admired the combat system, which he found "moves quickly, and reality is enhanced by the addition of modifiers for such factors as entrenchments and river crossings." However, he was not impressed by the South's victory condition of simply capturing Washington, pointing out "This can mean victory to the South when it is losing on all other fronts, and it encourages a last-minute lunge at the Union capital." However, Fawcett concluded on an upbeat note, saying, "A House Divided is fast moving, especially for a strategic-level simulation. All the necessary elements are accounted for in only four pages of rules, and even a game lasting the 40-turn maximum takes less than a full evening of gaming. Though there is less 'color' than in a tactical game, A House Divided does an excellent job of recreating the problems and decisions that the top commanders of both sides constantly faced."

In the January 1990 edition of Games International (Issue 12), Lee Brimmicombe-Wood complimented the second edition, saying, "GDW have produced a second edition which has refined an excellent game yet further." He concluded by giving the game an excellent rating of 4.5 out of 5, noting that players who owned the first edition as well as new players "might well consider buying a copy of this edition [...] there is something for everyone in this game and I can wholeheartedly recommend it."

A House Divided was chosen for inclusion in the 2007 book Hobby Games: The 100 Best. S. Craig Taylor, Jr. commented, "For my money, a great game is one that allows the player to make a series of important or key decisions that directly and understandably reflect on victory or defeat. Games that imitate reality on the game's own selected level without bogging down in details are often referred to as elegant, and that, in one word, sums up the appeal of A House Divided, the little game that could, and places it unmistakably onto any list of the very best wargames."

== Awards ==
- At the 1982 Origins Awards, A House Divided won the Charles S. Roberts for Best Pre-20th Century Boardgame of 1981
- At the 1990 Origins Awards, it won Best Pre-20th Century Boardgame of 1989.
