= The Journal of World War II Wargaming =

Magazine

The Journal of World War II Wargaming was a wargaming magazine first published in 1980 by Nick Schuessler and Wes McCoy.

== Contents ==
The Journal of World War II Wargaming was intended to be a critical journal for wargamers focusing on World War II games.

== Reception ==
Elton Fewell reviewed The Journal of World War II Wargaming in The Space Gamer No. 28. Fewell commented that "If you are a 'hardcore' WWII gamer, it's highly recommended. Others might consider it for the theory and analysis it will provide."

Journal of WWII Wargaming was awarded the Charles S. Roberts Award for "Best Amateur Adventure Gaming Magazine of 1981".
