= The Canadian Wargaming Journal =

Game magazine

The Canadian Wargamers Journal was a quarterly wargaming magazine. Published by the Canadian Wargamers Group from 1985 to 1996, for a total of 47 issues, its content primarily covered board wargaming with some articles about miniature wargaming.

== Canadian Wargamers Group ==
The magazine was published by the Canadian Wargamers Group of Calgary, Alberta. Keith Martens was the founder and editor and was joined by Bruce McFarlane (head contributor and writer) and Ken Hole (managing editor.) They have also produced many wargaming miniatures rules sets. Fallcon, Calgary's largest gaming convention, got its start thanks to CWG.

== Reception ==
It was the winner of four Charles S. Roberts Awards for "Best Amateur Wargaming Magazine" (from 1989 to 1992).
