= Lock 'n Load Publishing =

Game developer

- Company type: Developer and Designer of Board and Digital Games
- Industry: Strategy games for Tabletop Board Games, Digital Computer Games, Paperback and Audio Books, Virtual Modules for Vassal and Tabletop Simulator.
- Founded: 2006
- Headquarters: Pueblo, Colorado
- Key people: David Heath, Devin Heinle, Stephane Tanguay, Sean Druelinger, Tom Proudfoot, Marc von Martial, and Blackwell Hird
- Products: 165+
- Website: lnlpublishing.com

Lock 'n Load Publishing is a developer and publisher of board and computer games, specifically strategy games and wargames. They are based out of Colorado. From a small three-game beginning, Lock 'n Load Publishing has grown to a game company offering over fifty products including the Nations at War, World at War, Lock 'n Load, Corps Command, Tank on Tank series, Command Ops 2, and a company magazine, Line of Fire. In addition to historical, conflict-centered games, Lock 'n Load Publishing has also branched out into science fiction and horror, with All Things Zombie, Space Infantry, and Nuklear Winter '68.

== History ==
In 2003, Shrapnel Games published the first Lock 'n Load Tactical board game. Titled Forgotten Heroes, the game became an instant hit, selling out within the first year of publication. The next Lock 'n Load Tactical game quickly followed the module with the ANZAC Attack expansion, which also rapidly sold out.

Following the release of the original games, the next title, Band of Heroes, was published through Matrix Games. The game subsequently won the historical game of the year at the 2005 Origins Awards. In 2006, game designer Mark Walker founded Lock 'n Load Publishing.

In July 2014, entered a new stage with David Heath becoming LnLP's new principal owner and business manager. David Heath was the previous CEO/founder of Matrix Games, The Wargamer, and The Gamer's Network before leaving those companies and becoming the CEO of Lock 'n Load Publishing.

David expanded the design and development team, expanding the game titles and broadening its product lines. The new product lines included writing a series of paperback stories, accompanied by audiobooks editions. Other products and activities included a new sci-fi roleplayer game series, streamlining their popular game series and releasing Starter Kits allowing players to try their game series quickly and cheaply. Lock 'n Load Publishing games are even more accessible, being available for free on virtual gaming platforms such as Vassal and Tabletop simulators and, with the release of the game's Companion books, allowing players to play virtually without needing to own the tabletop board game.

In April 2020, Lock 'n Load Publishing had released, via Steam, its digital computer game line. These include the Tank On Tank, Nations At War, and Lock 'n Load Tactical series games for Windows, Mac, and iPad platforms. The World At War 85 Digital series is currently in development. The computer game, Victory and Glory: The American Civil War, similar to the 2016 predecessor, Victory & Glory: Napoleon (Also with a board game adaptation in 2017), was released for Windows PC in 2020.

== Awards ==
Lock 'n Load Publishing games have garnered awards from The International Gamers, Origins 2005 Historical Game of the Year, The Wargamer, Games Magazine, and a few of Charles S. Roberts' Awards, including best of the year award for Heroes of the Gap. Additionally, Mark Walker's novel World at War: Revelation was nominated for best game-related publication at the 2011 Origins Game Convention.

== Complete product line up ==
=== Tabletop Board Games ===
==== Lock 'n Load Tactical: ====
- Lock 'n Load: Band of Heroes (2005)
  - Lock 'n Load: Swift and Bold (2007)
  - Lock 'n Load: Not One Step Back (2007)
  - Lock 'n Load Tactical: Battle Pack Alpha (2007)
  - Dark July 43 Expansion: Lock 'n Load Tactical (2008)
  - Noville Bastogne's Outpost Expansion: Lock 'n Load Tactical (2009)
  - Lock 'n Load: A Ring of Hills (2009)
  - Lock 'n Load Tactical: Battle Pack Bravo (2009)
  - Days of Villainy: Lock 'n Load Tactical (2015)
- Lock 'n Load Tactical Core Rules: Lock 'n Load Tactical
- Lock 'n Load Tactical Core Rules Handbook: Lock 'n Load Tactical
- Lock 'n Load Tactical Player Aids: Lock 'n Load Tactical
- Lock 'n Load Tactical Battle Generator: Lock 'n Load Tactical
- Lock 'n Load Tactical Skill Cards: Lock 'n Load Tactical
- Lock 'n Load Tactical Player Aids: Lock 'n Load Tactical
- Lock 'n Load Tactical Quick Reference Flip Cards: Lock 'n Load Tactical
- Starter Kit: Lock 'n Load Tactical
- Solo: Lock 'n Load Tactical
- Day of Heroes: Lock 'n Load Tactical
- Heroes of the Nam: Lock 'n Load Tactical
- Pledge of Honor Expansion: Lock 'n Load Tactical
- Heroes of Normandy: Lock 'n Load Tactical
- Heroes of Normandy The Untold Stories Expansion: Lock 'n Load Tactical
- We Stand Alone Expansion: Lock 'n Load Tactical
- Battles to the Rhine Expansion: Lock 'n Load Tactical
- Bear and the Jackal Expansion: Lock 'n Load Tactical
- Heroes Against the Red Star: Lock 'n Load Tactical
- Red Gauntlet Expansion: Lock 'n Load Tactical
- Heroes in Defiance: Lock 'n Load Tactical
- Heroes of the Pacific: Lock 'n Load Tactical
- Hell Frozen Over Expansion: Lock 'n Load Tactical
- Heroes of the Falklands: Lock 'n Load Tactical
- A Feat of Arms Expansion: Lock 'n Load Tactical
- Heroes of the Motherland: Lock 'n Load Tactical
- Valor of the 13th Expansion: Lock 'n Load Tactical
- Heroes of North Africa: Lock 'n Load Tactical
- Compendium Vol I: Lock 'n Load Tactical
- Compendium Vol II: Lock 'n Load Tactical
- Compendium Vol III: Lock 'n Load Tactical
- Compendium Vol IV: Lock 'n Load Tactical
- Heroes of the Bitter Harvest: Lock 'n Load Tactical
- Enemy At The Gates Expansion: Lock 'n Load Tactical
- Heroes of Grenada: Lock 'n Load Tactical

==== Nations At War: ====
- White Star Rising Nations At War
- Desert Heat: Nations At War
- Stalin's Triumph: Nations At War
- Compendium Vol I: Nations At War
- Solo Assistant: Nations At War
- Starter Kit: Nations At War

==== World at War 85: ====
- Storming the Gap: World at War 85
- Storm and Steel: World at War 85
- Defense of Frankfurt: World at War 85
- Drive on Giessen: World at War 85

==== Nuklear Winter 68: ====
- Nuklear Winter 68
- Heart of Darkness Expansion: Nuklear Winter 68

==== Space Infantry: ====
- Space Infantry Resurgence
- Space Infantry Resurgence Expansion Box
- Space Infantry Federation
- Space Infantry Resurgence Core Rules

==== Tank On Tank: ====
- West Front: Tank On Tank
- West Front Defenders of the Rhine: Tank On Tank
- East Front: Tank On Tank
- East Front Red Storm in the Valley: Tank On Tank

==== Battles On Demand: ====
- The Day is Ours: Battles On Demand
- Atlanta Campaign: Battles On Demand
- Bougainville – The Forgotten Campaign: Battles On Demand
- Totensonntag: Battles On Demand
- Dawn's Early Light – Red Hammer: Corps Command
- Raid and Riposte: Battles On Demand
- It Started Here: Battles On Demand
- Wake Island – A Heroic Defiance: Battles On Demand
- Against the Odds: Battles On Demand
- No Honor in Surrender: Battles On Demand
- Lee At Gettysburg: Battles On Demand
- Rommel At Gazala: Battles On Demand
- Summer Lightning: Battles On Demand
- The Devils Beach – The Omaha Landings: Battles On Demand
- Bloody Mohawk: Battles On Demand
- Savage Wilderness: Battles On Demand
- Battle at Guilford's Courthouse: Battles On Demand

==== Other games: ====
- Ammo Crate
- A Wing and A Pray – Bombing the Reich
- The Pacific War
- Falling Stars Beginner Game
- Falling Stars Core Rules
- Falling Stars Into the Long Dark Night Adventure
- All Things Zombie
- All Things Zombie: Reloaded
- All Things Zombie: Fade to Black
- All Things Zombie: Nowhere Nevada

=== Digital Computer Games ===
==== Lock 'n Load Tactical Digital: ====
- Lock 'n Load Tactical Digital: Core Game (2020) (WW2 & Vietnam War settings. Updated engine & 5.0 rules from old 2014 edition's 3.5-4.0 rules.)

Tools/Misc:

- Lock 'n Load Tactical Digital: Battle Generator & Editor (2021)

World War II content:

- Lock 'n Load Tactical Digital: Heroes of the Bitter Harvest Battlepack 1 (2021)
- Lock 'n Load Tactical Digital: Valor of the 13th Battlepack (2021)
- Lock 'n Load Tactical Digital: Heroes of Normandy Battlepack 1 (2020)
- Lock 'n Load Tactical Digital: Heroes of Normandy Battlepack 2 (2021)
- Lock 'n Load Tactical Digital: Battles to the Rhine Battlepack (2021)
- Lock 'n Load Tactical Digital: Heroes in Defiance Battlepack 1 (2021)
- Lock 'n Load Tactical Digital: Heroes of the Pacific Battlepack 1 (2021)
- Lock 'n Load Tactical Digital: For the Emperor Battlepack (2021)
- Lock 'n Load Tactical Digital: Heroes of North Africa Battlepack 1 (2021)
- Lock 'n Load Tactical Digital: Noville Bastogne's Outpost Battlepack (TBA)
- Lock 'n Load Tactical Digital: Enemy at the Gates Battlepack (2022)
- Lock 'n Load Tactical Digital: We Stand Alone Battlepack (TBA)
- Lock 'n Load Tactical Digital: The Untold Stories Battlepack (TBA)
- Lock 'n Load Tactical Digital: Hell Frozen Over Battlepack (TBA)
- Lock 'n Load Tactical Digital: Heroes of the Motherland Battlepack 1 (TBA)

Vietnam War content:

- Lock 'n Load Tactical Digital: Heroes of the Nam Battlepack 1 (2020)
- Lock 'n Load Tactical Digital: Heroes of the Nam Battlepack 2 (2021)
- Lock 'n Load Tactical Digital: Pledge of Honor Battlepack (2022)

Other wars:

- Lock 'n Load Tactical Digital: Heroes of the Falklands Battlepack 1 (2020)
- Lock 'n Load Tactical Digital: Days of Villainy Battlepack (2020) (Libyan Crisis, 2011)
- Lock 'n Load Tactical Digital: Day of Heroes – Battlepack 1 (2022) (Battle of Mogadishu, 1993)
- Lock 'n Load Tactical Digital: Bear and the Jackal Battlepack (TBA) (Soviet-Afghan War)
- Lock 'n Load Tactical Digital: Heroes of Grenada (TBA) (U.S. invasion of Grenada, 1983)

Fictional settings/themes:

- Lock 'n Load Tactical Digital: Heroes Against the Red Star Battlepack 1 (2020) (Cold War)
- Lock 'n Load Tactical Digital: Red Gauntlet Battlepack (2021) (Cold War)
- Lock 'n Load Tactical Digital: Space Infantry Above and Beyond Battle Pack 1 (TBA) (Exoplanet, sci-fi)
- Lock 'n Load Tactical Digital: Zombies The Final Battle Battlepack 1 (TBA) (Zombie theme. WW2 to modern day.)

==== Nations At War Digital: ====
- Nations At War Digital: Core Game (2020)
- Nations At War Digital: White Star Rising Battlepack 1 (2020)
- Nations At War Digital: White Star Rising Battlepack 2 (2020)
- Nations At War Digital: Desert Heat Battlepack 1 (TBA)
- Nations At War Digital: Desert Heat Battlepack 2 (TBA)
- Nations At War Digital: Stalin's Triumph Battlepack 1 (TBA)
- Nations At War Digital: Stalin's Triumph Battlepack 2 (TBA)

==== Command Ops: ====
- Command Ops 2 Core Engine (2015)
- Command Ops 2 Vol 1: Highway to the Reich (2015)
- Command Ops 2 Vol 2: Foothills of the Gods (2015)
- Command Ops 2 Vol 3: Ride of the Valkyries (2015)
- Command Ops 2 Vol 4: Bastogne (2015)
- Command Ops 2 Vol 5: The Cauldron (2015)
- Command Ops 2 Vol 6: Knock On All Doors (2015)
- Command Ops 2 Vol 7: Westwall (2015)

==== Other video games: ====
- Mark H. Walker's Lock 'n Load: Heroes of Stalingrad (2014) (Old engine & rules (3.5 to 4.0))
- Falling Stars War of Empires (2016)
- Tank On Tank Digital - West Front (2017)
- Tank On Tank Digital - East Front Battlepack 1 (2017)
- Victory & Glory – The American Civil War (2020)

=== Audio and Paperback Books ===
- Space Infantry: Outpost 13
- Storming the Gap: First Strike
- Storm and Steel: Second Wave
- An Army of Two
- The Ghost Insurgency
- Heroes of Normandy: The Untold Stories
- Edge of the Line

=== Magazine Issues ===
- Line of Fire Magazine #1 (PDF Only)
- Line of Fire Magazine #2 (PDF Only)
- Line of Fire Magazine #3 (PDF Only)
- Line of Fire Magazine #4 (PDF Only)
- Line of Fire Magazine #5 (PDF Only)
- Line of Fire Magazine #6 (PDF Only)
- Line of Fire Magazine #7 (PDF Only)
- Line of Fire Magazine #8 (PDF Only)
- Line of Fire Magazine #9 (PDF Only)
- Line of Fire Magazine #10 (PDF Only)
- Line of Fire Magazine #11 (PDF Only)
- Line of Fire Magazine #12 (PDF Only)
- Line of Fire Magazine #13 (PDF Only)
- Line of Fire Magazine #15 (PDF Only)
- Line of Fire Magazine #14 (PDF Only)
- Line of Fire Magazine #15 (PDF Only)

== In Development ==
- Point Blank V is for Victory
- Blood and Fury: World At War 85
- Heroes of the Bitter Harvest: Lock 'n Load Tactical
- Enemy At The Gates Expansion: Lock 'n Load Tactical
- Heroes of Grenada: Lock 'n Load Tactical
