= Ulrich Blennemann =

German game designer

- Born: 1965
- Occupation: Game designer

Ulrich Blennemann is a game designer who has worked primarily on board games.

== Career ==
Uli Blennemann is brand manager for Phalanx Games b.v., a leading Dutch publisher of board- and card games since 2001. A historian by profession, he founded Moments in History in 1993, selling it in early 1999. Besides testing and some design work, he has developed more than 40 different games.

Blennemann lives in Duelmen, Germany.
