= Outline of the American Civil War =

Overview of the American Civil War

The following outline is provided as an overview of and topical guide to the American Civil War:

American Civil War – civil war in the United States of America that lasted from 1861 to 1865. Eleven Southern slave states declared their secession from the United States and formed the Confederate States of America, also known as "the Confederacy." Led by Jefferson Davis, the Confederacy fought against the United States (the Union), which was supported by all the free states (where slavery had been abolished) and by five slave states that became known as the border states.

== Etymology ==
- Names of the American Civil War

== Combatants ==
The Union (USA) also known as "The North" · Union Army · Union Navy

vs.

The Confederacy (CSA) also known as "The South" · Confederate Army · Confederate Navy

=== Union ===
- Abraham Lincoln
- Medal of Honor
- Old Glory
- Yankee

=== Confederacy ===
- Jefferson Davis
- Flags of the Confederate States of America

== Pre-war environment ==
- Antebellum era
- James Batchelder
- Bleeding Kansas
- John Brown (abolitionist)
- Anthony Burns
- John C. Calhoun
- Compromise of 1850
- Corwin Amendment
- Crittenden Compromise
- Force Bill
- Free Methodist Church
- Filibuster (military)
- Gag rule
- Georgia Platform
- Golden Circle (proposed country)
- Kansas–Nebraska Act
- Knights of the Golden Circle
- Manifest Destiny
- Missouri Compromise
- Morrill Land-Grant Colleges Act
- Morrill Tariff
- National Banking Act
- New York City secession
- Nullification Crisis
- Oberlin College
- Oberlin–Wellington Rescue
- Presbyterian Church
- Dred Scott
- Supreme Court cases of the American Civil War
- Third Party System
- Nat Turner
- Uncle Tom's Cabin
- Underground Railroad
- 1860 United States presidential election
- Wilmot Proviso

== Origins of the war ==
Origins of the American Civil War

- Abolition
  - John Brown
  - Frederick Douglass
  - William Lloyd Garrison
  - Lysander Spooner
  - Harriet Tubman
  - Underground Railroad
- Northwest Ordinance of 1787
- Missouri Compromise
- Nullification Crisis
- Compromise of 1850
- Antebellum era
- Bleeding Kansas
- Border states
- Secession
- Proclamation 80
- Slavery
  - African-Americans
  - Cornerstone speech
  - Emancipation Proclamation
  - Fugitive slave laws
  - Slave power
  - Uncle Tom's Cabin
- States' rights

== During the war ==
- Andersonville National Historic Site
- Christmas in the American Civil War
- Dahlgren Affair
- Emancipation Proclamation
- Habeas corpus
- Income tax in the United States
- Kaiser Burnout
- Mother's Day
- New York Draft Riots
- Nickajack
- The Philadelphia Inquirer
- Quantrill's Raiders
- Republic of Winston
- Sex in the American Civil War
- Thanksgiving: Lincoln and the Civil War
- Turning point of the American Civil War
- United States National Academy of Sciences
- 1864 United States presidential election
- West Virginia

== Commerce and Infrastructure ==
- Blockade runners of the American Civil War
- Confederate railroads in the American Civil War
- Confederate States of America dollar
- Cotton
  - History of cotton
  - King Cotton
  - Cotton diplomacy
  - Cotton gin
- Economy of the Confederate States of America
- Economy of the U.S. during the American Civil War
- National Bank Act
- Postage stamps and postal history of the Confederate States
- Salt in the American Civil War
- Southern Bread Riots
- Tredegar Iron Works
- Trent Affair

== Military Forces ==
=== Confederate Forces ===
- Military of the Confederate States of America
- Confederate Home Guard
- Confederate States Army
- Confederate States Marine Corps
- Confederate States Navy
- General officers in the Confederate States Army
- Missouri State Guard
- The Citadel
- Uniforms of the Confederate States military forces
- Virginia Military Institute

=== Union Forces ===
- Uniform of the Union Army
- Union Army
- Union Army Balloon Corps
- Union Navy
- United States Marine Corps
- United States Military Academy
- U.S. Military Telegraph Corps
- United States Naval Academy
- United States Sanitary Commission

== General Military ==
=== The Armed Personnel ===
- Infantry in the American Civil War
  - Zouaves of the American Civil War
- Cavalry in the American Civil War
- Field artillery in the American Civil War
- Siege artillery in the American Civil War
- Military leadership in the American Civil War
- Brevet
- List of American Civil War generals
  - Confederate Generals
  - Acting Confederate Generals
  - Union Generals
  - Union Brevet Generals

=== Firearms ===
- Brooke rifle
- Canister shot
- Coal torpedo
- Enfield rifles
- Fayetteville rifle
- Field artillery in the American Civil War
- Henry rifle
- Ketchum Grenade
- Land mine
- M1819 Hall rifle
- Machine gun
- Minié ball
- Naval mine
- Parrott rifle
- Pratt & Whitney
- Sharps rifle
- Spencer repeating rifle
- Springfield Model 1861
- Springfield Model 1863

=== Ships and Submarines ===
- CSS Virginia
- CSS Stonewall
- Confederate privateer
- H. L. Hunley
- Hospital ship
- Ironclad warship
- Submarines in the American Civil War
- Turret ship
- USS Monitor

=== Military strategy ===
- Military strategy in the industrial age
- Espionage (spies)
  - Allan Pinkerton
  - Confederate Secret Service
- Guerrilla warfare in the American Civil War
  - Bushwhacker
  - Jayhawker
- Scorched earth

== Fighting the War ==
=== Theaters ===
- Eastern Theater of the American Civil War
- Western Theater of the American Civil War
- Lower Seaboard Theater of the American Civil War
- Trans-Mississippi Theater of the American Civil War
- Pacific Coast Theater of the American Civil War
- Union naval blockade

=== Campaigns ===
American Civil War Campaigns

- Anaconda Plan
- New Mexico Campaign
- Jackson's Valley Campaign
- Peninsula Campaign
- Northern Virginia Campaign
- Maryland Campaign
- Stones River Campaign
- Vicksburg Campaign
- Tullahoma Campaign
- Gettysburg campaign
- Morgan's Raid
- Bristoe Campaign
- Knoxville Campaign
- Red River Campaign
- Overland Campaign
- Atlanta campaign
- Valley Campaigns of 1864
- Bermuda Hundred Campaign
- Siege of Petersburg
- Franklin-Nashville Campaign
- Price's Raid
- Sherman's March to the Sea
- Carolinas campaign
- Appomattox Campaign

=== Major battles ===
List of American Civil War battles

- Battle of Fort Sumter – April 12, 1861 and April 13, 1861
- First Battle of Bull Run – July 21, 1861
- Battle of Wilson's Creek – August 10, 1861
- Battle of Fort Donelson – February 12 to February 16, 1862
- Battle of Pea Ridge – March 7 and March 8, 1862
- Battle of Hampton Roads – March 8, 1862 and March 9, 1862
- Battle of Shiloh – April 6 and April 7, 1862
- Battle of New Orleans – April 25 to May 1, 1862
- Battle of Eltham's Landing - May 7, 1862
- Battle of Seven Pines – May 31 and June 1, 1862
- Seven Days Battles – June 25 to July 1, 1862
  - Battle of Gaines's Mill - June 27, 1862
  - Battle of Malvern Hill - July 1, 1862
- Second Battle of Bull Run – August 28 to August 30, 1862
- Battle of South Mountain - September 14, 1862
- Battle of Antietam – September 17, 1862
- Battle of Perryville – October 8, 1862
- Battle of Fredericksburg – December 11 to December 15, 1862
- Battle of Stones River – December 31, 1862 to January 2, 1863
- Battle of Chancellorsville – April 30 to May 6, 1863
- Battle of Gettysburg – July 1 to July 3, 1863
- Siege of Vicksburg – May 19 to July 4, 1863
- Battle of Chickamauga – September 19 to September 20, 1863
- Battles for Chattanooga – November 23 to November 25, 1863
- Battle of the Wilderness – May 5 to May 7, 1864
- Battle of Spotsylvania Court House – May 8 to May 21, 1864
- Battle of Cold Harbor – May 31 to June 3, 1864
- Battle of Atlanta – July 22, 1864
- Battle of Mobile Bay – August 5, 1864
- Battle of Guard Hill - August 16, 1864
- Battle of Fisher's Hill - September 21 to September 22, 1864
- Battle of Cedar Creek - October 19, 1864
- Battle of Franklin – November 30, 1864
- Battle of Nashville – December 15 to December 16, 1864
- Battle of Five Forks – April 1, 1865
- Battle of Sailor's Creek - April 6, 1865
- Battle of Appomattox Court House - April 9, 1865

== Involvement, by ethnicity ==
- Foreign enlistment in the American Civil War
- African Americans in the American Civil War
- German Americans in the Civil War
- Hispanics in the American Civil War
- Italian Americans in the Civil War
- Irish Americans in the American Civil War
- Native Americans in the American Civil War

== Involvement, by region ==
=== States ===
- Alabama
  - Alabama in the American Civil War
    - Mobile, Alabama, in the American Civil War
    - Montgomery, Alabama
    - Selma, Alabama, in the American Civil War
- Arizona
  - Confederate Arizona
  - Arizona Territory (USA)
- Arkansas
  - Arkansas in the American Civil War
- California
  - California in the American Civil War
- Colorado
  - Colorado in the American Civil War
  - Colorado Territory in the American Civil War
- Connecticut
  - Connecticut in the American Civil War
- Delaware
  - History of Delaware
- Florida
  - Florida in the American Civil War
    - Tampa in the Civil War
- Georgia
  - Georgia in the American Civil War
    - Atlanta in the American Civil War
- Idaho
  - Idaho in the American Civil War
- Illinois
  - Illinois in the American Civil War
- Indiana
  - Indiana in the American Civil War
    - Indianapolis in the American Civil War
- Iowa
  - Iowa in the American Civil War
- Kansas
  - Kansas in the American Civil War
- Kentucky
  - Kentucky in the American Civil War
    - Lexington, Kentucky, in the American Civil War
    - Louisville, Kentucky, in the American Civil War
- Louisiana
  - Louisiana in the American Civil War
    - Baton Rouge in the American Civil War
    - New Orleans in the American Civil War
- Maine
  - Maine in the American Civil War
- Maryland
  - Maryland in the American Civil War
    - Baltimore riot of 1861
- Massachusetts
  - Massachusetts in the American Civil War
- Michigan
  - Michigan in the American Civil War
- Minnesota
  - History of Minnesota
- Mississippi
  - Mississippi in the American Civil War
    - Vicksburg, Mississippi in the American Civil War
- Missouri
  - Missouri in the American Civil War
    - St. Louis in the American Civil War
- Montana
  - Montana in the American Civil War
- Nebraska
  - Nebraska in the American Civil War
- Nevada
  - Nevada in the American Civil War
- New Hampshire
  - History of New Hampshire
- New Jersey
  - New Jersey in the American Civil War
- New Mexico
  - New Mexico Territory in the American Civil War
- New York
  - New York in the American Civil War
    - New York City in the American Civil War
    - New York Draft Riots
- North Carolina
  - North Carolina in the American Civil War
    - Wilmington, North Carolina, in the American Civil War
- North Dakota
  - North Dakota in the American Civil War
- Ohio
  - Ohio in the American Civil War
    - Cincinnati in the American Civil War
    - Cleveland in the American Civil War
- Oklahoma
  - Oklahoma in the American Civil War
- Oregon
  - Oregon in the American Civil War
- Pennsylvania
  - Pennsylvania in the American Civil War
- Rhode Island
  - Rhode Island in the American Civil War
- South Carolina
  - South Carolina in the American Civil War
    - Charleston, South Carolina, in the American Civil War
    - Columbia, South Carolina, in the American Civil War
    - Mitchelville
- South Dakota
  - South Dakota in the American Civil War
- Tennessee
  - Tennessee in the American Civil War
    - Memphis, Tennessee in the Civil War
- Texas
  - Texas in the American Civil War
    - Houston, Texas in the American Civil War
- Utah
  - Utah in the American Civil War
- Vermont
  - Vermont in the American Civil War
- Virginia
  - Virginia in the American Civil War
    - List of American Civil War battles in Northern Virginia
    - Richmond in the American Civil War
    - Winchester, Virginia in the American Civil War
- Washington
  - Washington in the American Civil War
- Washington, D.C.
  - Washington, D.C. in the American Civil War
- West Virginia
  - West Virginia in the American Civil War
    - Harpers Ferry in the American Civil War
    - Romney, West Virginia, in the American Civil War
    - Shenandoah Valley
- Wisconsin
  - Wisconsin in the American Civil War
- Wyoming

=== Foreign countries ===
- Australia
  - Australia and the American Civil War
- Bahamas
  - Bahamas in the American Civil War
- Belize
  - Toledo Settlement
- Brazil
  - Santa Bárbara d'Oeste
  - Americana, São Paulo
- Canada
  - Canada in the American Civil War
- France
  - France in the American Civil War
- Mexico
  - Mexico in the American Civil War
  - Second Cortina War
  - Matamoros, Tamaulipas
  - Bagdad, Tamaulipas
  - Port Isabel, Sonora
- United Kingdom
  - United Kingdom and the American Civil War

== Aftermath of the war ==
- Assassination of Abraham Lincoln
- Civil rights movement (1896–1954)
- Alabama Claims
- Bureau of Refugees, Freedmen and Abandoned Lands
- Carpetbagger
- Confederados
- Freedman's Savings Bank
- Grand Army of the Republic
- James-Younger Gang
- Jim Crow laws
- Juneteenth
- Ku Klux Klan
- Last surviving United States war veterans
- Lost Cause of the Confederacy
- Memorial Day
- Mobile magazine explosion
- Neo-Confederate
- Old soldiers' home
- Plessy v. Ferguson
- Reconstruction era of the United States
- Redeemers
- Scalawag
- Southern Claims Commission
- Sultana
- Thirteenth Amendment to the United States Constitution
- Fourteenth Amendment to the United States Constitution
- Fifteenth Amendment to the United States Constitution
- Slavery and States' Rights
- United Confederate Veterans
- Unknown Confederate Soldier Monument in Horse Cave

== Historical Reenactment ==
- American Civil War reenactment

== Media ==
=== Books ===
==== Novels ====
- Gods and Generals
- Gone with the Wind
- The Killer Angels
- Little Women
- The Red Badge of Courage
- Uncle Tom's Cabin

=== Film, television and theatre ===
- Ken Burns
- Cold Mountain (film)
- Friendly Persuasion (film)
- Gettysburg (film)
- Glory (film)
- Gods and Generals (film)
- Gone with the Wind (film)
- Major Dundee
- Mourning Becomes Electra
- Ride with the Devil (film)
- Shenandoah (film)
- The Birth of a Nation
- The Good, the Bad and the Ugly
- The Horse Soldiers
- The Outlaw Josey Wales

=== Games ===
- Chancellorsville (game)
- Civil War (game)
- Dixie (card game)
- Terrible Swift Sword (game)
- Enduring Valor: Gettysburg in Miniature
- Gettysburg (game)
- Gods and Generals (video game)
- Civil War Generals 2 (video game)
- Sid Meier's Gettysburg! (video game)
- Ageod's American Civil War (video game)

=== Magazines ===
- CHARGE! (magazine)

=== Music ===
- Music of the American Civil War
- "The Night They Drove Old Dixie Down"

== See also ==
- War
  - Civil war
- Abolitionism: United States
  - Manumission
- Martial law: United States of America
- Racism
- Slavery
- Treason: United States
