= Civil War (board game) =

1961 board wargame

- Players: 2
- Setup time: 5 minutes
- Playing time: 60 to 90 minutes
- Chance: Medium
- Age range: 12+
- Skills: Tactics

Civil War is an early strategic board wargame published by Avalon Hill in 1961 that simulates the American Civil War. Unlike other games produced by Avalon Hill during this period such as Gettysburg, Civil War did not sell well and was dropped from production two years later.

== Description ==
Civil War is a two-player wargame in which one player controls Union forces and the other controls Confederate forces. Like other wargames produced by Avalon Hill, Civil War uses a hex grid map and a Combat Results Table to adjudicate battles. But unlike other wargames, it uses plastic tokens rather than cardboard counters.

The game covers the entire period of the American Civil War from April 1861 to March 1865. A player can win the game by controlling "replacement centers" located at the opposing (north and south) ends of the map board.

The game included a heavy cardstock game board, a rules sheet, advertisements for other AH games, and a pamphlet on the historical setting. There were two cardboard trays with sixteen blue plastic pawns, nine red pawns and one six-sided die.

The game board displays the eastern part of the United States from Missouri to Pennsylvania and eastern Texas at the top to northern Florida on the lower half. The map itself is white, with blue rivers, black railroads, brown rough terrain, and various cities and ports.

Six of the blue Union army pawns begin on the board, as well as six of the red Confederate States Army pawns. Reinforcements arrive much faster for the Union, with a total of fifteen pawns eventually in play versus nine for the Confederates.

Each game turn represents a month of time (1861 through 1865). Only one pawn may occupy a square at a time, and all pawns may move 1 or 2 hexes per turn, plus a bonus of 8 hexes if using the railroads.

Union pawns may move 8 hexes via rivers or the sea, while the Confederate pawns may only use rivers (and only get 2 hexes for that movement). All, any or none of the pawns may move each turn.

== Publication history ==
In 1961, the centenary of the start of the American Civil War, Avalon Hill published a trio of Civil War games designed by industry pioneer Charles S. Roberts: a reissue of Gettysburg with a new hex-grid map; Chancellorsville; and Civil War. Unlike the first two, which were marketed under Avalon Hill's "Tournament" line of wargames, Civil War was grouped with the "Family/Social" game line. The game failed to find an audience, possibly because it was too simple for wargamers but too complex for social gamers, and it was dropped from the Avalon Hill line in 1963.

A 1980 company history noted that the game was "A very abstract strategic game using a hex grid and plastic pawns. It is remembered primarily for its value to the collector due to its relative scarcity."

== Reception ==
Writing in the inaugural issue of The General, Carl Knabe admitted that he disliked Civil War because it was unbalanced, saying, "If he plays his cards right, the North can always win."

In a retrospective review in Issue 12 of Simulacrum, Joe Scoleri commented on the relatively quick failure of this game, saying, "I wouldn't be surprised if that was because it was too complex for social gamers yet too simple and abstracted for the Tournament gamers."

== Computer version ==
Civil War
- Developer: Avalon Hill
- Release: 1988
- Genre: Wargame

In 1988, Avalon Hill released a computer version of Civil War. It was not well-received. In a 1993 survey of pre 20th-century strategy games Computer Gaming World gave the game zero-plus stars out of five, stating that it "shows how one can take a highly playable boardgame and turn it into an unplayable computer 'product' [with] incomplete rules, incomplete graphics and incomplete programming". The magazine noted that Avalon Hill did not ship a promised update.
