= Kriegspiel (board wargame) =

1970 board game

Kriegspiel (from the German for "wargame") is often described as the board wargame published by Avalon Hill in 1970 that simulates a hypothetical war between two nations. The origin, however, dates back to a Prussian war game developed by a mapmaker and used to train soldiers. Although the simple 20th century game sold well to new players, it received negative reviews by more experienced gamers.

== Description ==
Kriegspiel is a two-player wargame of conquest that is designed to teach the basics of wargaming to new players.

=== Components ===
The game box contains:

- two-piece 16" x 16" mounted hex grid map
- 45 die-cut counters
- 16-page rulebook
- various charts and player aids

=== Gameplay ===
The game uses a simple alternating "I Go, You Go" system of movement and combat: one player moves and fires, and then the other player moves and fires. Instead of dice traditionally used in wargames to determine the results of combat, Kriegspiel cross-references the attacker/defender ratio against one of four defensive strategies and one of three offensive strategies to produce a combat result. There are also rules covering invasions, weather, prisoners, supply, and diplomacy.

== Publication history ==
In early 1970, Avalon Hill Vice-president Tom Shaw was expecting freelance game designer Jim Dunnigan to deliver a new introductory wargame in time for the American Toy Fair in March. However, Dunnigan was busy starting up his new company Simulations Publications Inc. (SPI) and was unable to deliver the expected game. Shaw decided to quickly design the game himself; in his own words, Kriegspiel was "one of my least serious games done in a panic in order to meet a toy fair deadline." He decided on an abstract game, something that Avalon Hill was known for. As Henry Lowood noted in the 2016 book Zones of Control: Perspectives on Wargaming, "During the Charles S. Roberts years and beyond, Avalon Hill wargames often portrayed hypothetical or abstract conflicts (Tactics, Tactics II, Blitzkrieg, [and] Kriegspiel.)"

The game proved popular among players new to the hobby, with sales of 86,000 units over ten years. But Kriegspiel met with universal disdain from veteran wargamers, and in a 1976 poll undertaken by SPI to determine the most popular wargames in North America, Kriegspiel was ranked dead last out of 202 games. In a similar poll conducted by Avalon Hill covering 25 of their own products, Kriegspiel again came in last.

As the Avalon Hill Company History noted in 1980, "Kriegspiel was a dismal failure from the wargamer's point of view. It was a constant target of derisive critics [...] Tom [Shaw]’s interests were shifting to the business end of the hobby and he had little interest in keeping up with the 'state of the art' in the design end. Fortunately for him and for AH, he restricted his talents to marketing hereafter and left wargame design to new faces."

Publication of Kriegspiel was discontinued in 1979.

== Reception ==
Kriegspiel received negative reviews upon its release. In his 1977 book The Comprehensive Guide to Board Wargaming, Nicholas Palmer said the low popularity of the game was because it "is far too simple for experienced wargamers." However, Palmer thought that it was "also of doubtful value to beginners." Although he thought the game had plenty of interesting rules, "The trouble is that the game's scale is too small, with the result coming after a few brisk firefights before any plan can really get underway." Palmer concluded that for that reason, it was not a good introduction to other wargames either.

In Issue 15 of Simulacrum, Joe Scoleri called Kriegspiel "close to being a great little introductory wargame [but] it left a lot to be desired." Scoleri didn't like the diceless combat result mechanism, calling it a simple and unexciting rock-paper-scissors exercise. He concluded that the small size of the game (only 45 counters) "made for limited gameplay value even though this was probably intended to make it more accessible to new gamers."

In Issue 21 of Albion, Don Turnbull noted that "Kriegspiel is not likely to make the same impact on 'hard-core' wargamers as did, say, Anzio. Not that sales have been poor — in fact I gather they have been magnificent; but the majority of the buyers represent just that section of the community Avalon Hill were after — the casual buyer — the mass-market member — who has a passing interest in games, but not in wargames per se."

In A Player's Guide to Table Games, John Jackson noted "There are not enough units or movement factors in Kriegspiel to risk anything more daring or decisive than a cautious advance."

== Other recognition ==
A "travelling" copy of Kriegspiel is traditionally the last item offered for sale during the Gencon Charity Auction. The game is returned to the convention the following year to be resold.

== Reviews ==
- The Playboy Winner's Guide to Board Games
