= Barbarossa: The Russo-German War 1941–45 =

1969 WWII board wargame

Barbarossa
- Cover of 2nd edition, 1971
- Designers: Jim Dunnigan
- Illustrators: Redmond A. Simonsen
- Publishers: Simulations Publications Inc.
- Publication: 1969
- Genres: WWII

Barbarossa: The Russo-German War 1941–45 is a board wargame published by Simulations Publications Inc. (SPI) in 1969 that simulates the conflict between Germany and the Soviet Union on the Eastern Front of World War II. This was only SPI's second game produced during a preliminary round of "Test Series" games, and proved to be the most popular. Despite the title, taken from the German operational name for their initial invasion of the Soviet Union, the game covers the entire Eastern Front campaign from the German invasion in 1941 (Operation Barbarossa) to the Fall of Berlin in 1945.

== Background ==
On 22 June 1941, less than two years after signing the non-aggression Molotov–Ribbentrop Pact with the Soviet Union, Germany attacked across a wide front, with several strategic goals in mind: the capture of Moscow, Leningrad and Stalingrad, and the acquisition of the Caucasus oilfields and agricultural lands. Although the Germans exploited the element of surprise and quickly realized large geographical gains through the summer and fall of 1941, their offensive thrusts came to a halt short of their objectives due to their long supply lines and the oncoming winter. Although the German offenses picked up in 1942, Soviet counterattacks once again brought the German advances to a halt. By 1943, the tide had turned with a major Soviet offensive that threw the Germans into a long retreat. In April 1945, Soviet forces occupied Berlin, bringing the war in Europe to an end.

== Description ==
Barbarossa is a strategic-level two-player wargame in which one player controls the German forces and the other player controls the Soviet forces.

=== Components ===
==== 1st edition ====
The "Test Series" game (first edition) was packaged in an envelope, and contained:

- 23" x 29" black-and-white paper hex grid map
- 255 unmounted (paper) counters
- sheet of typewritten mimeographed rules with hand-drawn maps and illustrations

==== 2nd edition ====
The second edition, published in 1971 as a boxed set, contained the same components, but of a better quality: the rulebook was professionally typeset, counters were die-cut cardboard, enlarged to 3/4", and the 4-color map had correspondingly larger hexes.

=== Scenarios ===
The game includes four year-long scenarios:

- "Barbarossa" (the 1941 German invasion of Russia)
- "Stalingrad" (1942 German offensive)
- "Zitadelle" (the 1943 German and Russian offensives)
- "Berlin" (the Russian 'final drive' of 1944–45)

These can be combined into a single long 45-turn campaign game. In addition, the game includes 15 non-historical "what-if" scenarios.

=== Gameplay ===
The game uses an "I Go, You Go" structure. Each turn, the Germans complete three phases:

1. First movement phase: Player may move any or all units up to their maximum movement rate.
2. Combat: Units of the active player may attack any units that are adjacent to them.
3. Second movement phase: Player may again move any or all units up to their maximum movement rate.

The second player then repeats all three phases to complete one turn.

== Publication history ==
In 1969, Avalon Hill dominated the wargame market, producing on average, one game per year with well-produced but expensive components. At the newly founded wargame publisher SPI, Jim Dunnigan and his design team decided to go in the opposite direction, marketing a number of very cheaply made "test games" to prove that producing many games a year could also be a viable business model. These test games featured typewritten pages with hand-drawn maps and graphics and thin paper counter sheets, packaged in a plain envelope. Barbarossa, designed by Dunnigan, was the second of these games (after Leipzig), and proved to be the most popular game of the "Test Series". Dunnigan, who designed all the games in the Test Series, said at the time that it was his best game.

As the company noted in a "TSG Review" column, there were some flaws in the rules for Barbarossa, and these were revised for the second edition, which was released in 1971 as a boxed set with upgraded components, and professional artwork and graphic design by Redmond A. Simonsen.

In 1982, SPI was unexpectedly taken over by TSR, which then repackaged and reissued several popular SPI titles under the TSR logo. Although TSR published a similarly titled Barbarossa: Game of the Russo-German War 1941-45 in 1986 that also covered the Eastern Front campaign, it was not based on SPI's game, being much more complex, with 800 counters, two 22" x 34" maps and a 32-page rulebook.

In 2008, Decision Games acquired the rights to the SPI game and produced a revised edition. Eight years later, Decision released an expanded game, Barbarossa Deluxe: The Russo-German War – 1941-1945.

In 2009, Kokusai-Tsushin (国際通信社) produced a Japanese-language version that was published in Issue 87 of Command magazine.

== Reception ==
In Issue 17 of Albion (June 1970), Don Turnbull found the rules "quite clear and logically laid out [...] with the singular exception of the application of the unusual (and, we think, rather artificial) rules governing movement." He noted that "As anticipated, the game becomes something of a slogging match." Turnbull didn't like the brevity of the small scenarios, noting that "One is aware that the particular game being played only represents a small part of the story, and when the game comes to an end, we felt there should be more to come." He also felt that several of the scenarios were unbalanced in favor of the Russians. Turnbull concluded that "This one is only a marginal 'HIT', and avoids being a 'miss' barely [...] For the mainstream of gamers I think it is destined to become 'just another game'." However, Turnbull did rate Barbarossa as much better than Avalon Hill's similar-themed 1963 game Stalingrad. Two years later, in Issue 3 of the UK magazine Games & Puzzles, Turnbull noted that it was "Perhaps the most popular Test Series game, particularly since the rules were re-written and the map re-drawn." He warned that the campaign game was very long and "battle fatigue assumes a reality."

Writing for The Pouch, Nicholas Ulanov gave the game an "Excellent" rating of 4 out of 4, saying, "Best strategic game ever designed and fantastic Russian front game. Very Realistic."

Writing in Issue 2 of Phoenix (August–September 1976), Peter Bolton complained that Barbarossa, published 7 years previously, was "The Forgotten Classic." Bolton made a case that the game should be tried by new players, pointing out "the German player needs a fair degree of subtlety and aggression to win against the ever growing number of Soviet units." He concluded, "The "Barbarossa" scenario has to be played and played and then played to appreciate all its good points. Then try the other scenarios — they all give you problems which need careful working out but it's very enjoyable trying them."

A year later, in his 1977 book The Comprehensive Guide to Board Wargaming, Nicholas Palmer called Barbarossa "one of SPI's most enduring successes." He noted that linking the four scenarios together "indulges the fans of long campaigns, 4–6 hours per game year."

In a 1980 survey of wargames in Moves about the Eastern Front, Steve List called Barbarossa an improvement over Avalon Hill's 1963 game Stalingrad, but said it was "far from perfect, and its second edition (1971) merely upgraded it to what was then state-of-the-art."

In The Guide to Simulations/Games for Education and Training, Martin Campion called the game "an excellent simulation of the strategic problems of the war in Russia." He further detailed the things the game demonstrated well: Russia's weak supply lines, their mobility in defense, and the improvement in Russian organization and supply during the war.

== Other reviews and commentary ==
- Fire & Movement #5, #51 & #62
- Strategy & Tactics #22
- International Wargamer Vol.4 #7
- The Wargamer Vol 1 #17
- Simulations Canada Newsletter #17
- Wargame News #39
- D-Elim Vol.2 #4

== See also ==
- Moscow '41
