= 1960s in games =

This page lists board games, card games, and wargames published in the 1960s.

== Games released or invented in the 1960s ==
- The Game of Life (1960)
- Management (1960)
- Battle Cry (1961)
- Chancellorsville (1961)
- Civil War (1961)
- D-Day (1961)
- Go — The International Travel Game (1961)
- Acquire (1962)
- Aggravation (1962)
- Oh-Wah-Ree (1962)
- Breakaway Rider (1963)
- Square Mile
- Vallco Professional Drag Racing
- Focus (1964)
- Probe (1964)
- Blitzkrieg (1965)
- Breakthru (1965)
- Mystery Date (1965)
- Nuclear War (1965)
- Squander (1965)
- Triominoes (1965)
- Fight in the Skies (1966)
- Guadalcanal (1966)
- Hey Pa! There's a Goat on the Roof (1966)
- Twister (1966)
- The Warlord (1966)
- Facts in Five (1967)
- Feudal (1967)
- Jutland (1967)
- Ka-Bala (1967)
- 1914 (1968)
- Strat-O-Matic Football (1968)
- Anzio (1969)
- Lensman (1969)
- Lines of Action (1969)
- Rivers, Roads & Rails (1969)
- Three musketeers (1969)

== Significant games-related events in the 1960s ==
- Parker Brothers is bought by General Mills (1963).
- Hassenfeld Brothers changes its name to Hasbro Industries and begins public trading on the American Stock Exchange (1968).
- Simulations Publications, Inc. founded by James F. Dunnigan (1969).
