= Afrika Korps (game) =

Board wargame

Afrika Korps game

Afrika Korps is a board wargame published by Avalon Hill in 1964 and re-released in 1965 and 1978 that simulates the North Africa Campaign during World War II.

== Background ==
British forces had enjoyed a great degree of success against Italian forces in North Africa in 1941. That changed after the arrival of the Afrika Korps under the command of Erwin Rommel, who launched an offensive against the Allies, defeating them at Gazala in June 1942 and capturing Tobruk. The Axis advance was stopped in July 1942 only 140 km (87 mi) from Alexandria in the First Battle of El Alamein. At the end of August 1942, Axis forces attempted to turn the southern flank of the Allied defenses at the Battle of Alam el Halfa, but were unsuccessful. The Allies counterattacked in October 1942, decisively defeating the Italian-German army in the Second Battle of El Alamein.

== Description ==
Afrika Korps is a two-player wargame in which one player controls the Allied forces and the other controls the Axis forces.

=== Components ===
The game includes:

- two-piece 44" x 14" mounted hex grid map of North Africa scaled at 10 mi (16 km) per hex
- 108 die-cut counters
- rules booklet
- Starting Setup and Order of Battle card
- Time Record Chart
- six-sided die

=== Gameplay ===
The game uses the standard alternating "I Go, You Go" system of movement and combat, and each turn represents two weeks of in-game time. The military units vary from regiment up to division size. The game's system emphasizes the importance of supply, particularly the variability of Afrika Korps' supply and reinforcements. Unlike other similar wargames published around the same time, units could not attack at will but had to use supply counters from a very limited pool to attack. Another innovation was the "Rommel rule" -- units that traveled with the Rommel counter could move further than normal.

The game only has one scenario, the historical game, and no optional rules.

== Publication history ==
Afrika Korps was designed by Avalon Hill founder Charles S. Roberts and was published in 1964. Players immediately noted several issues with play balance, and a second edition with slightly revised rules was released in 1965. In 1978, the second edition was repackaged with the same rules but updated components. Two years later, Don Greenwood extensively revised the rules and the resultant 3rd edition was released in 1980.

Afrika Korps was a bestseller for Avalon Hill – between 1964 and 1980, the company sold over 100,000 units of the game.

== Reception ==
In Issue 7 of the UK magazine Games & Puzzles, Mike Nethercot said "This is one of the few wargames [at the time] that deals exclusively with a British and Commonwealth campaign of WWII. For this reason, and because it is comparatively straightforward, it rates amongst the most popular titles in this country." Nethercot questioned the historical accuracy of the game, saying, "In my view, the game requires revision to give it a greater degree of historical realism, and to bring it up to date with the latest developments in the field of simulation game design." He concluded, "Even so, Afrika Korps is an enjoyable and entertaining game."

R. B. McArthur, writing for Washingtonian in 1980, said that "Avalon Hill's Afrika Korps, Stalingrad, D-Day, and Battle of the Bulge cover World War II in Europe pretty thoroughly. They are mostly popular with teenagers; those who actually fought in the war tend to find them jarringly inaccurate."

In his 1977 book The Comprehensive Guide to Board Wargaming, Nicholas Palmer called this game "Well balanced, fast-moving, easy to learn, but rather luck-dependent."

In the 1980 book The Complete Book of Wargames, game designer Jon Freeman said that "perhaps too many hangs in the balance of the few die rolls for weather, which affects German reinforcement and resupply, but barring freak probabilities, German chances remain good." He concluded by giving the game an overall evaluation of "good", saying, "Afrika Korps is full of minor historical inaccuracies, but after more than a decade and a half, it remains the most popular game in this popular theater."

In The Guide to Simulations/Games for Education and Training, Martin Campion said that "Afrika Korps is an easy game, but it has little claim to historical accuracy. It does reflect the uncertainty of Axis supply but probably too drastically."

== Other reviews and commentary ==
- JagdPanther No. 7
- Panzerschreck No. 1
- Spartan Simulation Gaming Journal No. 4 and No. 10
- Strategy & Tactics No. 23 and No. 40
- The Wargamer Vol.1 No. 3
