= Management (game) =

Business simulation board game

Management is a business simulation board game released by the Avalon Hill game company in 1960.

== Description ==
Management is a board game for two to four players that simulates business management practices of a generic manufacturing company. It was originally designed as a family game, but as The Urbanite Magazine noted in 2009, it was "used for years in many college-level business courses."

In the basic family game published in 1960, players each operate a manufacturing company: purchasing supplies, determining production volume, setting sale prices, and expanding factories. Turns are measured in business cycles. Players compete with each other by secretly bidding to purchase limited raw materials, and then secretly pricing their finished product, hoping to be the lowest priced supplier. The winner is the person at the end of the game with the largest company.

In 1973, the revised edition added three new layers of complexity:

- Basic Business Game: Adds capital expansion, financing, profit & loss statements, and balance sheets.
- Corporate Game: Adds economic markers, consumer boycotts, labor strife, government subsidies, discount wars, and tax reduction strategies.
- Classroom Game: Allows simultaneous play by an entire class.

The game comes with these components:

- a gameboard
- 60 RMU/FIU counters
- 32 STD/AUTO counters
- 24 situation cards
- a pad of Running Record sheets
- play money
- 2 cardboard trays
- a 4-page rulebook

== Publication history ==
Charles S. Roberts founded Avalon Game Company (later Avalon Hill) in 1952 to publish his military strategy game Tactics. Sales were strong enough by 1959 that Roberts moved into an office space and produced a number of non-military games, Management in 1960 being one of these. In a 2009 interview, Roberts said of all the games he designed at this time, he was the most proud of Management.

The first edition was released in 1960 in a 14.25 in × 11.25 in × 1.50 in (362 mm × 286 mm × 38 mm) flat box, then re-released the following year in a marginally larger 14.38 in × 11.25 in × 1.50 in (365 mm × 286 mm × 38 mm) flat box.

The first issue of The General noted that Management "has found considerable favor with professional administrators. We have learned that this game has been used in various management courses."

When the game was discontinued Avalon Hill claims it received "a flood of protests {...} from irate educators." After several years of not being available, the company released a new version of the game in 1973 retitled Business Strategy, with revised rules designed by Tom Shaw. The game was packaged in Avalon Hill's then-standard 11.5 in × 8.25 in × 2 in (292 mm × 210 mm × 51 mm) "bookcase" box. However, as noted in a company history of Avalon Hill, "This version sold no better than its predecessor."

== Educational use ==
In the book Teaching Data Analytics: Pedagogy and Program Design, Professor Stephen Penn (Harrisburg University of Science and Technology) commented "The game I've played the most [in class] is Avalon Hill's Business Strategy." Penn noted that "I've played the game several times where each player was converted to teams of four to six students" and pointed out that "One game may typically take several hours to play with a minimal number of players. Increasing the number of positions and the number of individuals per position and the number of times increases drastically. With everything considered, completion of the game is always secondary to learning." Penn then went on to outline in detail how he used the game in class, and what classroom resources he used to assist him.

In The Guide to Simulations/Games for Education and Training, Donald C. Davis gave a detailed explanation of how the Business Strategy edition worked, and concluded, "The classroom version allows teams to operate each business. Such teams could elect a chairman, board of directors, officers, etc. to administer each phase of operations."

== Reception ==
In Issue 43 of Strategy & Tactics, game designer Sid Sackson reviewed the updated Business Strategy edition and noted that the rules had not been completely updated, pointing out, "you will find several references to the 'Tournament Game' that are a hangover from the Management days and have no meaning in the present game." Sackson noted that although the 'Basic Business Game' and the 'Corporate Game' required a lot of bookkeeping, "The 'Family Game' is quite easy to learn and calls for a minimal amount of paper work."
