= D-Day (board game) =

Board game

D-Day box art (1961 version)

D-Day is a board wargame published by Avalon Hill in 1961 that simulates the six months of the European Campaign of World War II from the Normandy Invasion to the crossing of the Rhine. It was the first wargame to feature the now ubiquitous hex grid map and cardboard counters, and was revised and re-released in 1962, 1965, 1971, 1977 and 1991.

== Description ==
A two-player operational/strategic simulation of the Western Front between June and September, 1944, the game simulates the invasion by the Allies of France while it was occupied by the Axis powers. The title references the Normandy Landings in France on 6 June 1944, but the game covers the entire campaign to liberate France in World War II from Normandy to the Rhine River.

=== Components ===
The game box contains:

- mounted map of northern France from the Normandy beaches to the Rhine River
- 195 die-cut counters
- rules sheet

=== Gameplay ===
The German player sets up their counters first, without knowing where the Allied player will invade. The Allied player then launches an invasion, which can be anywhere from the southern coast of France up to the North Sea coast.

The game lasts for 10 turns, but as several reviewers noted, the game is generally decided in the first few turns — if the Germans cannot contain and destroy the Allies on the beaches, the rapid build-up of Allied reinforcements results in a rapid and inexorable Allied advance across France. Several reviewers noted the marked imbalance in the game that favors the Allies.

== Publication history ==
D-Day was designed by Avalon Hill's founder, Charles S. Roberts. Published in 1961, it was the first wargame that featured both a hex grid map and cardboard counters. Due to some issues with the rules, a second edition (known as 1961b) was published almost immediately. In 1965, Larry Pinsky revised the game again. Another revision by James Stahler appeared in 1977. All of these revisions used the same map and counter mix as the original game.

In 1991, Avalon Hill published a new revision as part of a partnership program with the Smithsonian Museum. This "Smithsonian Edition", designed by S. Craig Taylor, featured a new map, a new counter mix, new rules, and the use of two ten-sided dice, as well as a new "what-if" scenario in addition to the historical game.

== Reception ==
In Issue 51 of Games & Puzzles (August 1976), Nick Palmer called this "one of the classic wargames, first produced over a decade ago and still frequently played." He noted that "All the 'classics' have similar rules and are noted for high excitement and rule clarity levels, but relatively little historical detail." Palmer advised the German player that if the Allies could not be destroyed on the beaches, to immediately and rapidly withdraw to the western defenses to have any chance of winning the game. Palmer gave the game an Excitement level of 4 out of 5.

In The Playboy Winner's Guide to Board Games, game designer Jon Freeman pointed out that, although D-Day was a classic, "it does have its weaknesses. The game is inherently slow-paced: The defensive nature of the struggle, (the delaying tactics of the Germans, the defense based Combat Results Table, and the fortifications and terrain) combines with low movement factors to hinder a quick Allied march to the Rhine." Freeman advised, "players looking for a quick game had best look elsewhere."

Writing for Washingtonian in 1980, R. B. McArthur noted that "Avalon Hill's Afrika Korps, Stalingrad, D-Day, and Battle of the Bulge cover World War II in Europe pretty thoroughly. They are mostly popular with teenagers; those who actually fought in the war tend to find them jarringly inaccurate."

In the 1980 book The Complete Book of Wargames, game designer Jon Freeman thought that the rule changes made in the 1977 version vastly improved the game, saying, "The 1977 version did a really good job of clarifying the rules, gave the HQ units something to do [as part of a far more reasonable supply system], and, through the use of Allied airpower and the strategic movement, finally allowed some of those fairly 'mobile battles in central France.'" He concluded by giving it an Overall Evaluation of "Good".

In The Guide to Simulations/Games for Education and Training, Martin Campion thought that although "the game shows the hazards of an amphibious invasion and the necessity of attacking against weakness", he also pointed out several historical inaccuracies, saying, "Combat and movement are not very realistically handled and the balance of forces on both sides is erroneous. The game contains an abstract air power that is particularly fallacious."

In The Comprehensive Guide to Board Wargaming, Nick Palmer noted that "This AH 'classic' has quite a few devotees, and it often appeals to beginners. [...] The accent is on a fast, easy game rather than on historical accuracy." He believed "the historical 'feel' and the choice of strategies are conveyed rather well." Palmer did admit that the game was "widely thought to be vastly biased to the Allies, but a conservative German defence can work well." His final suggestion was "to have the initial German units face down, my personal variant for enlivening the early turns."

In A Player's Guide to Table Games, John Jackson noted that the 1965 edition "created as many problems as it corrected." He also warned "The game is inherently slow-paced" and advised "players looking for a quick game had best look elsewhere."

In Issue 2 of Berg's Review of Games, Richard Berg reviewed the 1991 "Smithsonian edition" and questioned the new, smaller map, which covered the entire European theatre from Normandy all the way to Vienna, although the Allies only have to cross the Rhine. In Berg's estimation, 40% of the map would never be used. Berg reviewed the major rules changes, but thought that "despite the game's new, spiffy set of togs, this is a pretty mundane affair." He also could not see who the audience was supposed to be, arguing that "This is not a game that will appeal very greatly to regular gamers, for whom it will not be enough, or to the 'classicists', for whom the changes will be too much." He concluded, "As 'simple', but not as accessible or as interesting as the old D-Day [...] While this may be a good game to get for your young nephew/niece, and it does have some interesting logistical overlay, this will not be a 'classic'."

== Other reviews and commentary ==
- Fire & Movement #65
- Panzerfaust #52, #56, #62 and #63
- Panzerschreck #1
- Spartan Simulation Gaming Journal #3
- Strategy & Tactics #17
- The Star Press
