= Second War =

Second War may refer to:

- World War II (1939–1945)

== Other wars ==
- Second Sacred War (449–448 BC)
- Second Samnite War (326–304 BC)
- Second Syrian War (260–253 BC)
- Second Punic War (218–202 BC)
- Second Macedonian War (200–196 BC)
- Second Servile War (104–103 BC)
- Second Mithridatic War (83–82 BC)
- Second Crusade (1145–1148)
- Second Barons' War (1264–1267)
- Second War of Scottish Independence (1328–1357)
- Second Italian War (1499–1504)
- Second War of Kappel (1531)
- Second Bishops' War (1640)
- Second English Civil War (1648–1649)
- Second Anglo-Dutch War (1665–1667)
- Second Silesian War (1744–1745)
- Second Anglo-Mysore War (1780–1784)
- Second Anglo-Maratha War (1803–1805)
- Second War against Napoleon (1813–1814)
- Second Barbary War (1815)
- Second Seminole War (1835–1842)
- Second Carlist War (1846–1849)
- Second Anglo-Sikh War (1848–1849)
- Second Anglo-Burmese War (1853)
- Second Opium War (1856–1860)
- Second Italian War of Independence (1859)
- Second Schleswig War (1864)
- Second Taranaki War (1864–1866)
- Second Matabele War (1896–1897)
- Second Boer War (1899–1902)
- Second Balkan War (1913)
- Second Zhili–Fengtian War (1924)
- Second Italo-Ethiopian War (1935–1936)
- Second Sino-Japanese War (1937–1945)
- Second Cod War (1972–1973)
- Second Gulf War, one of three wars in the last two decades of the twentieth century and in the first decade of the twenty-first century
- Second Sudanese Civil War (1983–2005)
- Second Congo War (1998–2004)
- Second Chechen War (1999–2009)
- Second Liberian Civil War (1999–2003)
- Second Lebanon War (2006), the Israeli name for the 2006 Lebanon War

== Fictional ==
- Second Bloody Valentine War
- Second Robotech War
- Warcraft II: Tides of Darkness, a computer game

== See also ==
- Second Civil War (disambiguation)
