= Chancellorsville =

Chancellorsville may refer to:

- Chancellorsville, Virginia, United States, an unincorporated community
  - Battle of Chancellorsville (1863) in the American Civil War
- Chancellorsville (game), a two-player wargame
- USS Chancellorsville, the former name of USS Robert Smalls, a US Navy guided missile cruiser
