= We the People (boardgame) =

1993 board wargame

- Cover art by William Trego
- Designers: Mark Herman
- Illustrators: William Trego; Stephen Langmead
- Publishers: Avalon Hill
- Publication: 1993
- Genres: American Revolution

We the People is a card-based board wargame published by Avalon Hill in 1993 that simulates the American Revolution. It was the first wargame to use cards as the primary way to control the pace and tempo of play.

== Description ==
We the People is a two-player game in which one player controls American forces, while the other player controls British forces.

=== Gameplay ===
The game board shows the thirteen colonies and south-eastern Canada, towns and cities connected by lines. Each player's objective is to control a majority of colonies by occupying city and town spaces with political control markers. During each one-year turn of the game, players alternate playing strategy cards drawn from a 64-card deck. These allow use of operations points or special events to affect the political and military situations.

The game sequence is:

- Reinforcement Phase
- Deal Strategy Cards: Each player gets seven strategy cards
- Strategy Phase: Players play the strategy cards dealt to them
- Winter Attrition
- French Naval Phase
- Political Control Phase
- End Phase: Determine if automatic victory occurs or the game ends.

If the answer in the End Phase is "No", the play returns to the top of the sequence. A game lasts between five and nine turns.

=== Movement ===
When a general moves, he takes up to 5 troop points (10,000 men) with him, crossing a maximum of 4 zones. Troops without a general cannot move. If a general reaches a zone occupied by opposing troops, a battle ensues (unless the other player retreats before combat).

=== Combat ===
Each player draws as many battle cards as the number of troop points they have, plus their general's battle rating, each card representing a tactical military maneuver and its defensive counter, for example: “Flank Attack Left / Refuse Right Flank”.

During each round of battle, the attacker plays a card which the defender must match with his/her own identical card or else the defender loses. After each round, the defender rolls a die to attempt to become the attacker for subsequent rounds of combat, with better generals having a greater chance of passing the die roll.

=== Victory conditions ===
The American player wins by fulfilling any one of three conditions:

- if there are no British units in the thirteen colonies any time during the game.
- if, at the end of the game, Americans control nine colonies (including Canada).

The British player wins by fulfilling any one of three conditions:

- if there are no American units in the thirteen colonies at any time during the game.
- if George Washington is captured.
- if, at the end of the game, British control five colonies (not including Canada).

== Publication history ==
In the early 1990s, Eric Dott, then president of Monarch Avalon, approached game designer Mark Herman to create an introductory-level game on the American Revolution. Herman started to design a simplified version of 1776 [Avalon Hill, 1974], but after reading the American Revolution memoirs of British officer Lt-Colonel John Graves Simcoe, he scrapped his first design and started on a new concept to better approximate a war of skirmishes and raids. The result was We the People, published by Avalon Hill in 1993 as a boxed set that used the 1883 painting The March to Valley Forge by William Trego as cover art. Interior art was by Stephen Langmead.

We the People was the first wargame to use cards as the primary way to control the pace and tempo of play, with a strong element of fog of war through hidden card information. Herman later wrote, "One of my early decisions was to allow [this game methodology] to become public domain, opening up the hobby's design aperture by not pursuing this path. Many [card-driven game] designs followed the look and feel of We the People, using a point-to-point movement system with named leaders who were activated with the cards." This started a new genre of wargames that have emphasized competitive play and a strong historical narrative.

Avalon Hill and Mark Herman combined again in 1988 to produce a sequel, For the People, which won the Charles S. Roberts Award that year for Best Pre-World War II Board Game.

GMT Games produced a number of games implementing this system, including The Napoleonic Wars, Here I Stand, Virgin Queen, Twilight Struggle, and Tanto Manta.

== Reception ==
In Issue 12 of Richard Berg's Review of Games, Andrew Maly noted, "This is a slick design, certainly the Revolutionary War equivalent of A House Divided. It is not the hard core, definitive game on the subject, but a low complexity, easily accessible game with depth and detail far greater than the rules would have you believe." However, Maly believed this game only had limited appeal, mainly to "Fans of the Revolutionary War; People who are looking to introduce newcomers to wargaming; and Wargamers who enjoy good, quick games with esoteric mechanics" and felt the $40 price tag would be a barrier to wider acceptance. Maly concluded, "This is a shame, because although WtP may not be a classic (yet), it's a nifty design which plays fast, provides lots of fun, and is actually a decent portrayal of the American Revolution."

In Issue 87 of the British wargaming magazine Perfidious Albion, Charles Vasey commented "We the People is not, of course, perfect but it is the easiest game to play and enjoy (even if you do not agree with it) that I know." Vasey did admit "The only nagging worry I have is that certain tactics may establish themselves that answer historical problems in an unhistorical fashion." Vasey also warned "by its chaotic card system it makes 'perfect plans' very very difficult to depend upon." Vasey also pointed out "The game is biased in play towards the Americans but less than any other game on the subject and no more than history requires, and not enough to make the US player complacent." Despite this, Vasey concluded, "We the People will set you talking and playing ... Get it now!"

In Issue 80 of the French game magazine Casus Belli, Frank Stora liked the quality of the components, writing, "The contents live up to expectations: a beautiful cardboard map depicting the Thirteen Colonies and 132 superb full-color counters." Stora also found the rulebook well-written, commenting, "Unlike too many designers who seem to think that 'simple' rhymes with 'sloppy', the game's author, Mark Herman, shows us in twelve clear, concise pages that he is a true professional. Everything is explained precisely, with supporting diagrams." While Stora liked the rules of movement and combat, he disagreed with the victory conditions, noting that "This gives Rhode Island, with its single zone, the same importance as New York and its ten zones! ... I find this a bit excessive." Despite this, Stora concluded, "We the People is an excellent game that can appeal to veteran players as well as introduce beginners to the genre! A professional piece of work."
