= Fateful Lightning =

1994 American Civil War wargame

- Designers: Chris Perello
- Illustrators: Beth Queman
- Publishers: XTR Corp
- Publication: 1994
- Genres: American Civl War

Fateful Lightning, subtitled "The Battle of Gettysburg", is a board wargame published by XTR Corporation in 1994 that simulates the Battle of Gettysburg during the American Civil War.

== Description ==
Fateful Lightning is a board wargame for 2 players, where one player controls Union forces, while the other controls Confederate forces.

=== Components ===
The game box includes two 22" x 34" hex grid maps of the Gettysburg battlefield and environs scaled at 200 yards (180 m) per hex, 920 counters, a 20-page rulebook and various player aids.

=== Gameplay ===
In many other wargames, Player A always moves first, followed by Player B. In this game, each Turn is made up of one or more "couplets". A die roll determines which player moves first; that player can either choose to end the Turn, or take their usual movement and attack, followed by the other player. This is then followed by another couplet, and another, until the player going first decides to end the Turn. Occasionally, the die roll will indicate that the Turn ends immediately. So a Turn may be composed of no couplets or an unlimited number of couplets. Critic Peter Perla commented, "This adds a bit of uncertainty and extra spice to the situation."

=== Combat ===
There are three types of combat: Regular (a range of 1 hex), Bombardment (a range of 2 hexes), and Charge. Determining the result of combat depends on the morale of the attacking units.

For example, if the attacking units have a +2 advantage over the defender and the attacking player rolls a 3 on the Combat Results Table, the result is "A6(Ex)" — "Attacker Morale 6 results in Exchange". If any of the attacking units have a morale of less than 6, that unit is disrupted and the attack fails. If all attacking units have a Morale of 6 or more, the attack succeeds, with "Exchange" as the result — the defender loses all their units in the hex, and the attacker loses the same number of units.

==== Charging ====
For Charge combat, the unit must first make a Morale check to determine if the charge is successful. If the check fails, the attacker will suffer extra damage and the charge fails. If the Morale check succeeds, each charging unit attacks each defending unit in turn until either the attacker is disrupted or eliminated or the defender’s hex is emptied. If the defender's hex is emptied, the charging units may continue to attack any adjacent enemy stacks.

=== Returning routed unit to the game ===
Unlike other contemporaneous wargames, this game does not use "step reduction", where during combat a unit's strength is degraded step by step until the unit is finally eliminated. Instead, units are deemed to have been routed, and are removed from the board. Each brigade has a number of Extra Strength (ES) points. When a unit is routed, the brigade can spend some of its ES points to return the unit to play.

=== Command and control ===
Each army is subject to a particular state of Initiative: Full, Partial or Low.

- Full: All leaders are active and may use all of their command capabilities. All combat units have 4 movement points and are free to enter enemy zones of control (ZOCs).
- Partial: Leaders are active, and units may enter enemy ZOCs, but units only have a movement allowance of 1.
- Low: Units have a movement allowance of 1, but may not enter an enemy's ZOC, and all leaders are inactive unless they can make a wake up call versus their activation level.

== Publication history ==
Fateful Lightning was designed by Chris Perello, with cartography by Beth Queman, and was published by XTR Corporation in 1994.

== Reception ==
In Issue 92 of the British wargaming magazine Perfidious Albion, Charles Vasey commented, "What an interesting game. Almost everything [designer Chris] Perello does is different from the perceived wisdom. Yet the rulebook is of readable proportions." Vasey concluded, "At times the XTR striving after innovation looks rather pathetic, but at others one begins to wonder."

In Issue 16 of Berg's Review of Games, Peter Perla thought the map was unattractive, writing, "Unfortunately, the map stretches the envelope for ugly." Editor Richard Berg inserted an editorial note that it was "considered one of the least attractive maps in decades." Perla also found issues with the rulebook, noting, "There are more holes in the rules than in a tree on a Civil War battlefield. Yet, once you free your mind of its preconceptions, you can begin to understand what the rules are trying to say. And you realize that there are a lot of interesting design ideas here." Perla also warned, "This is not an easy game to learn or master. Vagaries, abundant errata, and rules holes don’t help. Tweezers are essential [for moving counters], and it is long, especially for new players." Despite this, Perla concluded, "Important but flawed. If you want a quick and easy game at this scale, this is not it. But if you have a serious interest in Civil War battle tactics in general, and Gettysburg in particular, then you should definitely experience Fateful Lightning.

In Issue 3 of Zone of Control, John W. Kisner called the map created by Beth Queman "utilitarian and generally pleasing to the eye, but is scarred by some of the ugliest hills and ridges I can recall." Kisner found the rules extremely disorganized and ambiguous, pointing out, "These are perhaps the worst ever published by XTR, with many sections so ambiguous that only a careful reading of one of the lavish examples can divine the true intent." However, Kisner did find, that once the rules had been properly understood, "I like these rules for the feelings of realism they engender; even more do I appreciate the subtle ways in which the design rewards player skill." Kisner concluded, "This is easily the most innovative design I've encountered since GMT's [The Great Battles of] Alexander. It marks a revolution against cumbersome procedures and record-keeping ... Although not perfect, it is a game of the people, by the people, and for the people, and that's good enough for me."
