= Civil War =

Civil War may refer to:

- Civil war, a war between organized groups within the same state or country

== Armed conflicts ==
- American Civil War (1861–1865)
- Chinese Civil War (intermittently 1927–1949)
- English Civil War (1642–1651)
- Finnish Civil War (1918)
- Indian Civil War (1857–1859)
- Irish Civil War (1922–1923)
- Russian Civil War (1917–1922)
- Spanish Civil War (1936–1939)
- Nigerian Civil War (1967–1970)
- Syrian civil war (2011–2024)
- Salvadoran Civil War (1979–1992)

=== Lists of armed conflicts ===
- List of civil wars
- List of Roman civil wars and revolts

== Film ==
- Captain America: Civil War, a 2016 American superhero film
- Civil War (or, Who Do We Think We Are), a 2021 documentary by Rachel Boynton
- Civil War (film), a 2024 American film directed by Alex Garland

== Television ==
=== Episodes ===
- "Civil War", a 1998 episode of Everybody Loves Raymond
- "Civil War", a 2017 episode of Avengers Assemble
- "Civil War", a 2025 episode of Casualty
- "Civil War", a 2015 episode of Cedar Cove
- "Civil War", a 2017 episode of Grey's Anatomy
- "Civil War", a 2025 episode of I Was Reincarnated as the 7th Prince so I Can Take My Time Perfecting My Magical Ability
- "Civil War", a 2016 episode of Scorpion
- "Civil War", episode two of Turning Point: The Vietnam War, 2025
- "Civil War", a 2021 episode of Whitstable Pearl
- "Civil Wars", a 1998 episode of Ally McBeal
- "Civil Wars" (The Legend of Korra), episodes of The Legend of Korra

=== Shows ===
- The Civil War (miniseries), a 1990 American documentary TV series
- Civil Wars (TV series), a 1991–93 American legal drama

== Gaming ==
- Civil War (board game), a 1961 board wargame
  - Civil War (1988 video game), an adaptation of the board game
- Civil War (1968 video game), an early text-based strategy video game
- The Civil War (video game), a 1995 strategy game
- The History Channel: Civil War – A Nation Divided, a 2006 video game

== Music ==
- Civil War (band), a Swedish metal band
- The Civil Wars, an American folk band
  - The Civil Wars (album), a 2013 album by the Civil Wars
- Civil War (album), a 2008 album by Dillinger Four
- The Civil War (album), a 2003 album by Matmos
- "Civil War" (song), a song by Guns N' Roses from Use Your Illusion II
- The Civil War (musical) (1998)
- The Civil Wars: A Tree Is Best Measured When It Is Down, an opera by Robert Wilson

== Other uses ==
- Civil War game, a nickname for the football game between Oregon State University and the University of Oregon with "Civil War" used in general for the Oregon–Oregon State rivalry
- Civil War (comics), a Marvel Comics crossover storyline
  - Civil War II, a follow-up to the 2006 Marvel series

== See also ==
- List of civil wars
- Bellum civile (disambiguation)
- Chinese Civil War (disambiguation)
- First Civil War (disambiguation)
- Second Civil War (disambiguation)
