= 1950s in games =

== Games released or invented in the 1950s ==
- Afrikan tähti (1951)
- Yahtzee (1954)
- Tactics (1954)
- Careers (1955)
- Jotto (1955)
- Perquackey (1955)
- Risk (1957, in French as La Conquête du Monde)
- Gettysburg (1958)
- RSVP (1958)
- Diplomacy (1959)

== Significant games-related events in the 1950s ==
- Avalon Hill Game Company founded by Charles S. Roberts to publish the first board wargame, Tactics. For many years Avalon Hill was a dominant maker of wargames.
