= First Civil War =

First Civil War may refer to:

- First Central American Civil War (1826–1829)
- First Civil War (Kazakh Khanate) (1522–1538)
- First Congo War (1996–1997), also referred to as a civil war
- First English Civil War (1642–1646)
- First Honduran Civil War (1919)
- First Ivorian Civil War (2002–2007)
- First Liberian Civil War (1989–1996)
- First Libyan Civil War (2011)
- First Republic of the Congo Civil War (1993–1994)
- First Sudanese Civil War (1955–1972)
- First War of Religion (1562-1563) in the French Civil Wars of Religion

== See also ==
- Civil War (disambiguation)
- Second Civil War (disambiguation)
