= Hey Pa! There's a Goat on the Roof =

Board game

- Publishers: Parker Brothers
- Players: 2–6
- Setup time: 1–5 minutes
- Playing time: 30+ minutes
- Chance: High
- Age range: Not listed
- Skills: Spinner (game)
- Along with the colorful board game you are a farmer on your own ranch, get rid of that goat!

Hey Pa! There's a Goat on the Roof was a children's board game issued by Parker Brothers in 1966. The main objective to the overall game is to get more cans than any other player. The player with the most cans win the game.

== Details ==
The game revolves around a game board featuring plastic farm-related items sticking out of it. Each player selects a goat as their playing piece, placing the pieces along the goat pen on the board. Players move goat-shaped pieces around the board, attempting to complete tasks to win tin can pieces. The first player to move their goat onto the roof of the barn ends the game, and the winner is then the player with the most tin cans. Movement is determined by an included spinner, which makes the game run purely on luck.

=== Game pieces ===
- Deck of cards
- Six Goat player figures
- A farmer piece
- A bell
- Box of cans

== Sources ==
- Hey Pa! There's a Goat on the Roof at BoardGameGeek
