= Gettysburg (game) =

American Civil War board wargame published in 1958

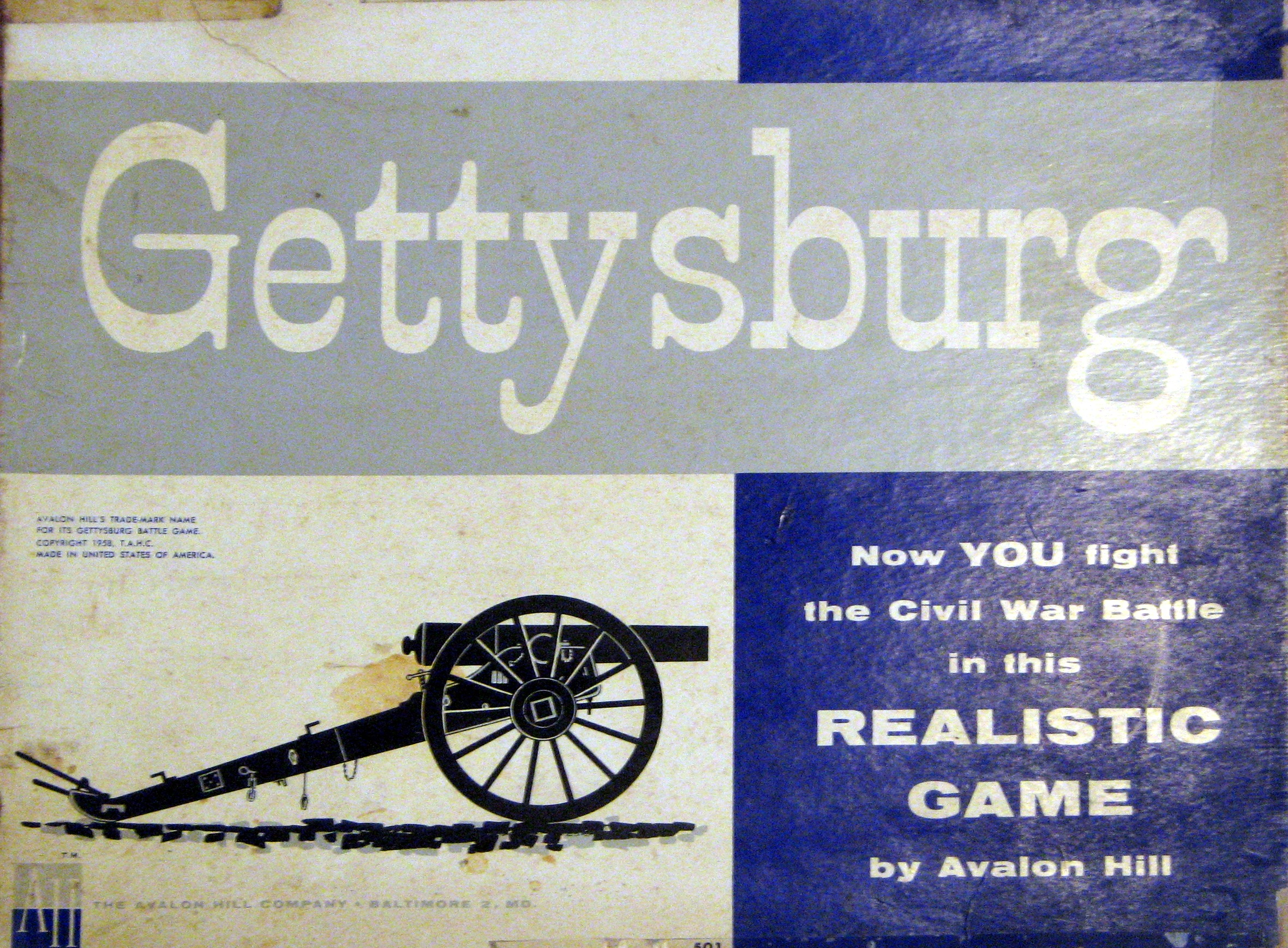
- Gettysburg box cover Gettysburg (1958) by Avalon Hill
- Players: 2
- Setup time: 15 minutes
- Playing time: 4 to 6 hours
- Chance: Medium
- Age range: 12+
- Skills: Tactics, strategy

Gettysburg is a board wargame produced by Avalon Hill in 1958 that re-enacts the American Civil War battle of Gettysburg. The game rules were groundbreaking in several respects, and the game, revised several times, was a bestseller for Avalon Hill for several decades.

== History ==
Gettysburg was originally published in 1958, and was the first board wargame based on a historical battle.

Gettysburg has game mechanics similar to Avalon Hill's ground-breaking Tactics II (1958). In particular, the combat results table favors attacking where one has a local superiority of numbers. Unlike Tactics II, Gettysburg gives each unit an orientation, and an attacker can improve his odds by attacking a defender from the side or from the rear. The defender, meanwhile, can improve his odds by entrenching himself atop a hill.

Charles S. Roberts, the founder of Avalon Hill, made the following comment about the game in 1983:

Gettysburg was selected as a subject because of the upcoming Civil War Centennial, a wise choice because the celebration was widely publicized. Gettysburg, by the by, was notable because it was the first modern historic wargame. More ruefully, it was also the first and last wargame to be introduced with no playtesting whatsoever, an omission which plagued it through numerous futile redesigns. However, it sold very well and in spite of its flaws has to be counted as a successful title.

In its original form, Gettysburg played something like a miniatures game. The map was marked off in a square grid, but this was used for tracking hidden movement, not to regulate regular movement. Movement instead used range cards, which were also used to check firing ranges. The rectangular (not square) units were allowed to rotate on their centers before using the range card, and the system gave bonuses for firing on a flank.

In 1961, the game was re-released, redone to use a hex grid, which also appeared in other Avalon Hill games released that year. This proved a popular mechanism for regulating movement, with it being a staple of wargame design ever since, but Avalon Hill returned to a square grid (albeit with more normal movement rules) for the 1964 edition of the game.

In addition in 1961, Avalon Hill also marketed a special low-price edition with an unmounted map and a "Battlefield Edition" sticker on the cover that was only sold in the town of Gettysburg and at the battlefield gift shop.

The hex grid returned for the 1977 redesign of the game, which also introduced multiple counters for each unit and expanded rules of unit formation. The rules additions were an attempt to simulate unit movement in columns and the delay and difficulty of changing formation into a line of battle. Separate counters represented flanks, which could be turned to join adjacent units' flanks or turned back to defend against expected assault. Although the grid was retained for the 1988 redesign, the multiple counters per unit and overly complex unit formation rules were discarded, and this last iteration of the game bore a stronger resemblance to the 1961 version, save for the full color illustrated board of the 1977 edition. A new edition for the 125th anniversary of the battle was published in 1988.

A sister game, Chancellorsville, used the same game mechanics.

== Reception ==
During the first five years of publication, Avalon Hill sold nearly 140,000 copies of Gettysburg at $4.95 each.

Although it was still for sale in the mid-1970s, Gettysburg was seen by the wargaming community as out-of-date. In a 1976 reader poll conducted by Simulations Publications Inc. to determine the most popular board wargames in North America, Gettysburg was rated 189th out of 205 games.

In his 1977 book The Comprehensive Guide to Board Wargaming, Nicky Palmer noted its relative unpopularity at the time, saying, "it is too simple to appeal to the hard-core, there is a play-balance problem, and the attractive map is insufficiently used." However, he thought for newer players, "it is quite a reasonable game in its class, a brisk, easy classic, and quite a pleasant introduction to the hobby for anyone interested in the period. Experts will prefer Terrible Swift Sword."

In Issue 26 of the British wargaming magazine Perfidious Albion, Andrew Grainger reviewed the 1977 edition, saying "The whole thing is, I feel, very realistic and moves quite smoothly, although it takes a bit of getting used to. The combat rules in particular have to be carefully read." Grainger also would have liked the inclusion of designer's notes and some extra scenarios, but concluded, "Overall I think the game has a lot to offer ... Because the system is a bit of a fiddle to play and is fairly complex I would say it will appeal more to the Civil War buff and Gettysburg fan than the gamer who just wants a good game."

In Issue 27 of Phoenix, Donald Mack liked the rule in the 1977 version of Gettysburg that prevents a unit from attacking that has a combat strength less than 1/6th of its opponent. Instead, that weak unit must retreat, preventing tactical but suicidal "soak-off" attacks. However, he pointed out problems with the road movement rule that resulted in "blue and grey columns whizzing across the map in a manner which would have astounded [General Robert E.] Lee and [General George] Meade."

R. B. McArthur for Washingtonian in 1980 said that "It is not hard to improve on Lee's actual tactics at Gettysburg – just don't charge uphill against massed, fortified, grapeshot-firing cannon. But winning the battle for the South is tough. Strong men have been known to weep when, once more, someone drives old Dixie down."

In The Guide to Simulations/Games for Education and Training, Martin Campion reviewed the 1977 edition and noted with approval the improvements that had been made to the original game mechanics. In terms of using this game in the classroom, Campion noted that "The combat rules are probably more intricate than most teachers will have time for, but they might appreciate that the game contains plenty of opportunities to use multiple commanders."

In the 1980 book The Complete Book of Wargames, game designer Jon Freeman also reviewed the 1977 edition, and had little good to say about it, commenting "It's one of the most splendid examples of wretched excess ever published. All that tremendous order-of-battle work [...] is straitjacketed by a playing board that makes no sense. The scale is totally wrong for regimental simulation, and the game map, which is pretty but hard to read, is virtually ignored in terms of terrain effects and movement." He concluded by giving the game an Overall Evaluation of only "Fair", saying, "In some respects it may be a better historical tool than SPI's vaunted Terrible Swift Sword, but no one in his right mind would want to play it."

In Issue 54 of Moves, Steve List reviewed the 1977 edition and commented, "All in All, the Introductory game is too simple and the Advanced too complex, and both are married to a map which is not the best scale for the purpose. The Intermediate game is the best, but was not as well done as it could be due to the time and ingenuity expended on trying to make the Advanced [game] work." List concluded by giving the Introductory game a grade of "C", the Intermediate game a "B", and the Advanced game a "C".

Gettysburg was chosen for inclusion in the 2007 book Hobby Games: The 100 Best. Game designer Lou Zocchi commented, "With Gettysburg, designer [Charles S.] Roberts created a game that evoked memories of brilliant commanders such as Lee and Jackson, even as players grew to understand the intricacies of their commands."

== Reviews ==
- Panzerfaust and Campaign #75

== Awards ==
At the 1989 Origins Awards, the 125th Anniversary edition of Gettysburg won "Best Pre-20th Century Boardgame of 1988".

== Legacy ==
Gary Gygax and Dave Arneson, co-designers of Dungeons & Dragons, reported that their first board wargame was Gettysburg. According to Gygax, "I’d purchased an AH game (GETTYSBURG) in ‘58 or ‘59 and avidly sought more."
