= RSVP (board game) =

Word game

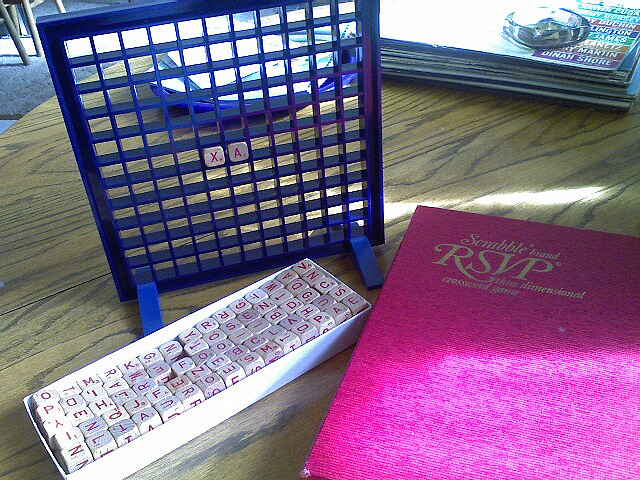
RSVP word game by Scrabble

RSVP was a vertical version of Scrabble introduced by Selchow and Righter in 1958 and promoted as "3-D Scrabble". Two players spelled words using cubical tiles with letters on an upright grid board.

RSVP was sold in the UK under the Spear's Games label as item #1051 (Copyright 1966 by Production and Marketing Company, 1968 J. W. Spear & Sons Ltd) with the how to play/rules printed inside the box lid.

The playing space is a dark blue vertical frame, held upright by two detachable black feet, with 11 x 11 square holes with 75 wooden block lettered playing pieces available to place within that frame. The letter blocks are similar to regular Scrabble tiles showing a large letter and a small number for their scoring point value (identical on their opposing faces). There are no 'blank' blocks.

From the introduction inside the box lid:

RSVP is played on both sides of an upright frame by two players. The object of the game is to form horizontal and vertical words by placing letter blocks in crossword fashion on your side of the frame while blocking the formation of words on the opposite side. It is to each player's advantage to place letter blocks so that they cannot be used by his opponent and, whenever possible, to use letters placed from the opposite side. A total to be played to is determined at the start of the game - usually 100 points.
