= Vallco Professional Drag Racing =

Card-based drag racing game

Vallco Professional Drag Racing is a card-based drag racing game invented by Greg Zyla originally in 1963.

The game was inspired in part by Strat-O-Matic baseball and LeMans racing board games. It combined cards (containing driver statistics, including averaged e.t.s, wins, losses, holeshot wins and losses, and breakage rates) with die rolls (four per race). Zyla's prototype game used statistics for "Dyno Don" Nicholson, Ronnie Sox, Gas Ronda, Hayden Proffitt, Dick Brannan, Dave Strickler, and some other Pro Stock and A/FX (pre-Funny Car) racers. Burnouts were governed by die rolls, also.

NHRA required Zyla to get signed releases from every driver involved. Only Don "The Snake" Prudhomme's lawyer sought a licensing fee; when Zyla revealed he was a mere "mom and pop" operator, Prudhomme wished him luck.

When it reached the market in 1975, the game offered only Pro Stock drivers (31 in all), relying on their 1974 season's statistics. There were also anonymous cards, for players who wanted to race, themselves.

The game accounted for changing track conditions and oildowns, as well as the latest NHRA rules.

Zyla's first advertisement was in National Dragster in 1975.

By 1977, Zyla had added Top Fuel Funny Car (including East Coast match racers like Tim Kushi) and Dragster drivers. Later editions added Pro Comp, for one year only; the statistics cards for Pro Comp are now hard to find.

A 1976 piece by Woody Hatten in Super Stock & Drag Illustrated magazine (based on the experience of a group who played the game on a regular basis, of which Hatten was a member) garnered national attention. Some professional racers, including Bob Glidden, Al Hanna, and "Dandy Dick" Landy (who purchased six copies), also played.

Priced at $8.95 when originally released, the price rose as high as $16.95 before it went out of production in 1980. Approximately 3000 copies were sold.

Inventor Zyla continues to write two weekly syndicated columns for Gannett and GateHouse Media, one a test-drive column and one a collector car/motorsports column as of July 29, 2020. He did build his own race car from the proceeds of the game in 1979, and had two successful seasons driving his gas powered Vega Panel Wagon funny car. He was the Top Winner in 1980 at Numidia Dragway in Pennsylvania in 1980 scoring six wins and three runner ups in 18 races. See his homepage for examples of his current work, photos, interviews, etc. at zylamotorsports.com or at gregzyla.com.
