= Eric Dott =

American publisher

- Born: Aaron Eric Dott
- Died: 4 April 2016 (aged 89); Baltimore, Maryland
- Employer(s): Monarch Avalon, Inc.
- Spouse: Esther Dott

A. Eric Dott (c. 1927 - 4 April 2016) was a Baltimore, Maryland printer and publisher, who was involved primarily with tabletop games. He founded or purchased dozens of printing and game publishing companies under the Monarch Avalon, Inc. umbrella, including Avalon Hill. He was also owner of the Sands Hotel and Ricky's Chinese restaurant in Ocean City in the 1960s, and Peerce's Plantation restaurant.

== Career ==
Eric Dott was the president of printer company Monarch Services. One of his clients was the wargaming company Avalon Hill, and when founder Charles S. Roberts left the publishing business in 1963 over financial problems, he handed the company to Monarch and the Smith Box Company, its two biggest creditors. Under Dott, who was making most of the key decisions, Monarch Services ultimately became the sole owner of Avalon Hill, and he revived the companies fortunes. Dott oversaw Avalon Hill when it published the third edition of RuneQuest in 1984, referring to the game as the "Cadillac" of the Avalon Hill game line.

Dott was the owner of The Avalon Hill Game Company before going public as Monarch Avalon, Inc. and later sold it to Hasbro.

Dott was not a game player himself. When asked about his political philosophy, as a maker of war games, Dott replied "We're pretty much all conscientious objectors here." Dott added, "the FBI and the Secret Service have come around asking questions several times".

== Death ==
Dott died at Gilchrist Hospice on April 4, 2016, at age 89.
