= Moscow '41 =

Play-by-mail wargame

- Publishers: Vigard Simulations
- Publication: 1984 to unknown
- Genres: Military strategy, play-by-mail
- Languages: English
- Systems: computer and hand moderated
- Materials required: Instructions, order sheets, turn results, paper, pencil
- Media type: Play-by-mail or email

Moscow '41 was a closed-end, military strategy, play-by-mail (PBM) wargame.

== History and development ==
Moscow '41 was a closed-ended, military strategy PBM wargame of medium to hard complexity. It was published by Vigard Simulations in Orangevale, California. Paper Mayhem announced it as a new game in 1984. It was designed by Dean S. Ross. It was mixed-moderated, using both computer and hand moderation. The game was originally designed for face to face play.

== Gameplay ==
The game centers on Operation Barbarossa in Europe in 1941, with two players, one each playing Germany and Russia.

== Reception ==
Bob Mclain, the editor of Gaming Universal, said that the game was "The most detailed and realistic wargame on the market." Reviewer Guy Fusson stated that it lacked the "intense player interaction" of larger PBM games, but provided utility for a segment of wargamers. He added,

This game is an impressive first offering for a company; it faithfully recreates this decisive battle of the Second World War with realistic feel, superb balance and historical accuracy. Well matched players will find themselves haunted by earlier decisions made too hastily, and the outcome is often in question down to the final turn.

== Reviews ==
The Grenadier, No. 18.

== See also ==
- List of play-by-mail games

== Bibliography ==
- Editors (January–February 1984). "Gamealog: Moscow '41". Gaming Universal. No. 2. p. 43.
- Editors (May–June 1984). "Gameline News & Updates: Vigard Simulations". Paper Mayhem. No. 6. p. 18.
- Fusson, Guy (Autumn 1984). "Moscow '41". Flagship. No. 4. pp. 15–17.
