= Chancellorsville (game) =

War-game set during the US Civil War

- Chancellorsville box cover Chancellorsville (1961) by Avalon Hill
- Players: 2
- Setup time: 15 minutes
- Playing time: 4 to 6 hours
- Chance: Medium
- Age range: 12+
- Skills: Tactics, Strategy

Chancellorsville is a board wargame produced by Avalon Hill in 1961, and republished in 1974 that simulates the Battle of Chancellorsville during the American Civil War.

== Background ==
In late April 1863, the Army of the Potomac confronted the Army of Virginia near Chancellorsville, Virginia. Confederate general Robert E. Lee confidently attacked the much large Union army, and Union general Joseph Hooker withdrew his army in response, resulting in a major Confederate victory.

== Description ==
Chancellorsville is a two-player wargame that covers three days of the battle.

=== Components ===
The game box of the 1977 edition includes:

- 22" x 28" mounted hex grid map
- 169 die-cut counters
- 13-page rule book
- Historical notes

=== Gameplay ===
Counters represent brigades and artillery battalions (blue for the Union and pink for the Confederates). Strength points are in scale with the relative strength and firepower of the actual brigades represented by the counters. As with the Gettysburg game system, Chancellorsville gives each unit an orientation, and an attacker can improve their odds by attacking a defender from the side or from the rear. The defender, meanwhile, can improve their odds by entrenching units atop a hill.

Day turns represent three hours, and nights are covered by two turns. The turn sequence is move and then fight, although defending artillery can break with this to fire at enemy units up to two hexes away.

== Publication history ==
Chancellorsville and its sister game Gettysburg were designed by Charles S. Roberts, and were published by Avalon Hill in 1961 to coincide with the 100th anniversary of the start of the American Civil War. They were the first wargames to use a hex grid.

Although its sister game Gettysburg was very popular, Chancellorsville was not well received, especially the map, which did not have any terrain lines. Instead each hex was simply filled in with a single color. The game was dropped from Avalon Hill's product line after two years.

Ten years later, Randall Reed revised the game rules, and the map was redrawn with traditional terrain marks. The result was published in 1974.

The 1974 reprint spawned another variant (which required Chancellorsville to play), which included three additional scenarios for battles that occurred in and around the Northern Virginia area, including Fredericksburg (December 1862), The Wilderness (May 1864), and Spotsylvania (May 1864). In addition, the Avalon Hill gaming magazine, The General (Volume 12, #6), included unmounted counters and rules for four new scenarios ("The Rappahannock and Battle of Fredericksburg," and three new scenarios for "Chancellorsville").

== Reception ==
In Issue 54 of Moves, Steve List thought that the 1974 edition was "a much more workable game. The map has been revised so it looks like a map rather than an abstract pattern of pastel hexagons." He concluded by giving the game a grade of B, saying, "All told, a reasonably good division level game. It is not an ambitious design, but it is not a spectacular failure either."

In his 1977 book The Comprehensive Guide to Board Wargaming, Nick Palmer thought the 1974 edition was much improved over the 1961 edition, mentioning new additions such as "Attractive board; detailed rules for river crossing; bloodless CRT, with units dispersed and regrouping, often during the night; optional artillery rule and other possibilities." Although he called the game well-balanced, he warned that "the difficulty in seeing who is winning is that the Union always does splendidly, but needs a massive triumph to win the game."

In the 1980 book The Complete Book of Wargames, game designer Jon Freeman thought the game was unbalanced, predicting that "the Union player should win at least three out of five games." Freeman also questioned the historicity of the game, saying, "the tremendous problems inherent in the battle are largely ignored by the designers. [...] The differences between the two armies — the differences that decided the battle — are swept under the rug of overt simplicity." Freeman concluded by giving the game an Overall Evaluation of only "Fair", saying, "It's better than it used to be back in 1961, but that's not saying much."

== Other reviews and commentary ==
- Fire & Movement #88
- Panzerfaust #66
