= Second civil war =

Second Civil War, or Civil War II may refer to:

== Historical wars ==
- Second Central American Civil War (1838–1840)
- Second Congo War (1998–2003), also referred to as a civil war
- Second English Civil War (1648–1649)
- Second Honduran Civil War (1924)
- Second Ivorian Civil War (2010–2011)
- Second Liberian Civil War (1999–2003)
- Second Libyan Civil War (2014–2020)
- Second Republic of the Congo Civil War (1997–1999)
- Second Sudanese Civil War (1983–2005)

== Fictional or hypothetical wars ==
- The Second Civil War, 1997 made-for-television film
- Civil War II, a Marvel Comics comic book crossover storyline
- Civil War (film), a 2024 American film directed by Alex Garland, about a second American civil war

== See also ==
- First Civil War (disambiguation)
- Civil War (disambiguation)
