= Squander =

Board game

$QUANDER
- Publishers: Avalon Hill
- Chance: Medium
- Skills: Strategic thought

Squander (written as "$QUANDER" on the box and in the rules) is an Avalon Hill board game published in 1965. It is based loosely on the game Monopoly, but in reverse. As in Monopoly, players roll dice and move around a board, encountering opportunities to make financial decisions. The object, however, is to lose money rather than gain it. Each player starts with a million "Squanderbucks" and the winner is the first player to become bankrupt.
