= Campaigns of the American Civil War =

Organized long-term military operations during the American Civil War

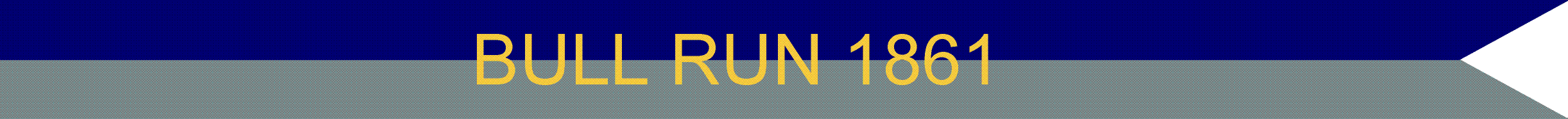
Union Forces campaign streamer

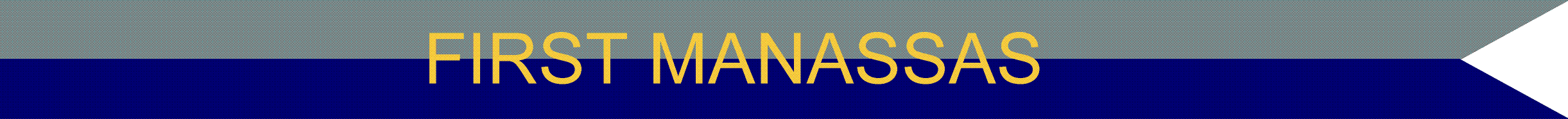
Confederate Forces campaign streamer

The campaigns of the American Civil War are categorized in various ways. The U.S. Army Institute of Heraldry has identified 25 campaigns that are used for streamers, decorative devices attached to unit flags that denote participation in historic battles or campaigns. (An alternative campaign categorization is that of the National Park Service, charged with maintaining Civil War battlefields and other historic sites. This categorization is more detailed and inclusive than the Army heraldry version, particularly for actions outside the Eastern Theater and Western Theater; see Category:Campaigns of the American Civil War.)

The Civil War campaign streamers are equally divided with blue and gray. Units that received campaign credit as a Confederate unit (only applicable to some current Army National Guard units from Southern states) use the same ribbon with the colors reversed. Blue refers to Federal service and gray to Confederate. Joined they represent the unification of the country after the Civil War.

The following inscriptions in yellow, shown in all capital letters, are authorized on the streamers:

Campaign	Effective dates of campaign	Notes
Sumter	April 12–13, 1861	
Bull Run	July 16–22, 1861	("First Manassas" for Confederate service)
Henry & Donelson	February 6–16, 1862	
Mississippi River	February 6, 1862 - July 9, 1863	
Peninsula	March 17 - August 3, 1862	
Shiloh	April 6–7, 1862	
Valley	May 15 - June 17, 1862	
Manassas	August 7 - September 2, 1862	("Second Manassas" for Confederate service)
Antietam	September 3–17, 1862	("Sharpsburg" for Confederate service)
Fredericksburg	November 9 - December 15, 1862	
Murfreesborough	December 26, 1862 - January 4, 1863	
Chancellorsville	April 27 - May 3, 1863	
Gettysburg	June 29 - July 3, 1863	
Vicksburg	March 29 - July 4, 1863	
Chickamauga	August 16 - September 22, 1863	
Chattanooga	November 23–27, 1863	
Wilderness	May 4–7, 1864	
Atlanta	May 7 - September 2, 1864	
Spotsylvania	May 8–21, 1864	
Cold Harbor	May 22 - June 3, 1864	
Petersburg	June 4, 1864 - April 2, 1865	
Shenandoah	August 7 - November 28, 1864	
Franklin	November 17–30, 1864	
Nashville	December 1–16, 1864	
Appomattox	April 3–9, 1865	
