= Tactics (game) =

1954 board wargame

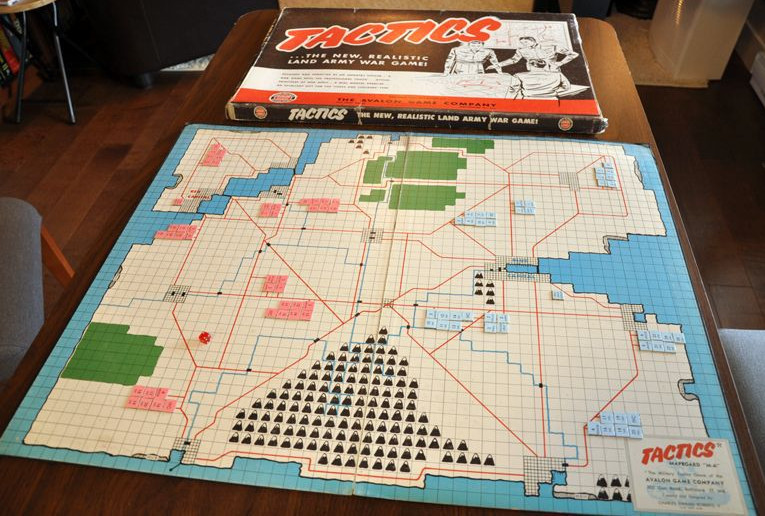
- Tactics (1954)
- Other names: Tactics
- Manufacturers: Monarch Services; J.E. Smith & Co.
- Designers: Charles S. Roberts
- Publishers: Avalon Hill Games
- Publication: 1954; 71 years ago II: 1958; 67 years ago
- Years active: 1954-1958; II: 1958-1972, 1973-1998
- Genres: war
- Languages: en
- Players: 2
- Playing time: 120 minutes
- Age range: 12 and up

Tactics is a board wargame published in 1954 by Avalon Hill as the company's first product. Although primitive by modern standards, it and its sequel, Tactics II, signalled the birth of modern board wargaming for the commercial market. Tactics is generally credited as being the first commercially successful board wargame.

== Publication history ==
Wargames before 1950 were usually just a set of rules — players were expected to provide their own miniature soldiers and create suitable terrain as a battleground. Charles S. Roberts believed there was a market for an entirely self-contained wargame that would include a map and soldiers in the form of cardboard counters, as well as rules and a box to hold everything.

In 1952, Charles S. Roberts began work on designing a new game from his house in the Avalon neighborhood of Catonsville, Maryland. He designed a game that was similar to other wargames published in England and elsewhere over the previous half-century, albeit not for the mass market. It was enough of an improvement to be considered by many to be the first second-generation print wargame produced for the civilian market.

It was a revolutionary design in many ways, that Roberts recalled confounded new players more accustomed to rules like chess and checkers. This game became Tactics, which Roberts self-published out of his house in 1954, using the name "The Avalon Game Company", later changed to "Avalon Hill". It eventually became the first commercially successful board wargame. For the first six years, Roberts sold the game on a mail order basis from his home in Catonsville, outside Baltimore, selling 2,000 copies and barely breaking even.

In 1958, Roberts replaced Tactics with a revised game titled Tactics II. The rules were nearly identical, with only slight changes made to the map and counters. In 1961, Avalon Hill produced an updated edition of Tactics II. In 1972, production was discontinued due to rising costs. In 1973, Tactics II was redesigned with less costly components, and sold as a loss-leader, being a "gateway" game that Avalon Hill hoped would lead new players into the hobby.

In 1983, Avalon Hill released a 25th anniversary edition of the original Tactics, with a new and different map.

== Description ==
Tactics and Tactics II are 2-player board wargames, pitting the military forces of two imaginary nations, Blue and Red, against each other. Although they have identical armies, the geography of each nation is different.

== Gameplay ==
Tactics was a revolutionary design in many ways, that Roberts recalled confounded new players more accustomed to rules like chess and checkers. According to Roberts,

Tactics introduced a totally new method of play which had no parallel in games designed to that point and potential players had difficulty in grasping the simple mechanics. It was revolutionary to say that you could move up to all of your pieces on a turn, that movement up to certain limits was at the player’s option and that the resolution of combat was at the throw of a die compared to a table of varying results. As simple as this sounds now, the new player had to push aside his chess-and-checkers mindset and learn to walk again.

Tactics pioneered game mechanics that have become standard in the board wargame industry, including:

- the odds-ratio combat results table (CRT)
- different movement costs for entering squares (later hexes) containing different types of terrain
- the use of cardboard counters which had been previously introduced in the 1911 "invasion literature" genre game War Tactics or Can Great Britain Be Invaded?.
- The use of an alternating series of "I Go, You Go" turns, where one player moves as many units as desired and then attacks, followed by the other player.

Counters include armored units, headquarters units, regular infantry units, and specialized units consisting of mountaineers, paratroopers, and amphibious units. There are special rules for roads, hidden movement, amphibious units, mountaineering units and paratroops. There are also optional rules for nuclear weapons, reinforcements, supply, and weather.

== Reception ==
In 1976, the UK magazine Games & Puzzles admitted that this game was "much criticized", and that "its main shortcoming was the use of a square grid rather than a hex grid." Nonetheless, it was "a useful tool in teaching the rudiments of serious board wargaming. [...] the game allows experimentation with a large number of war game techniques and is in itself an interesting strategic game which is easier to play than most of the games from [Avalon Hill]."

In 1980, in The Guide to Simulations/Games for Education and Training, Martin Campion noted that this game was one of the two original commercial wargames, "and many old-timers have a soft spot in their hearts for it." He added that "It is sometimes recommended as an introductory game and in fact has served that function for many wargamers, but it has a square grid that makes its geography somewhat different from that of the now standard hexagon grid board." Campion concluded, "It has little historical [simulation] interest because its representation of World War II conditions is so oversimplified."
