= Stalingrad (wargame) =

1963 board wargame

Stalingrad is a strategic-level board wargame published by Avalon Hill in 1963 that simulates the first 24 months of the war between Germany and the Soviet Union during World War II. As one of the first board wargames (and the first one about the Eastern Front) it was extensively played and discussed during the early years of the wargaming hobby.

== Description ==
Stalingrad is a two-player game that, despite its title, covers the entire East Front campaign between Germany and the Soviet Union from June 1941 to May 1943. Often criticized for lack of realism, Stalingrad is the predecessor of the many Eastern Front wargames that have since been published.

=== Components ===
The game box contains:

- 22" x 28" mounted hex grid map scaled at 50 km (31 mi) per hex
- 117 die-cut counters
- rule booklet
- battle manual and rules supplement
- various charts and player aids
- six-sided die

=== Gameplay ===
The Soviet player sets up their units first, then the German player is allowed to inspect the Soviet positions before deploying their forces. Each side may deploy freely, although the Germans are limited as to how many factors may be deployed in Finland.

As an early wargame, Stalingrad uses a simple "I Go, You Go" system: the Germans bring on reinforcements and replacements, then move, and engage in combat. Then the Russians bring on replacements, move and engage in combat. Each turn represents one month, and the game ends after 24 turns or if the Germans fulfill one of their victory conditions before the end of the game.

==== Movement ====
Key terrain features include major cities, rivers, rough terrain and swamps. Defenders can gain advantages in battle by occupying cities, rough terrain and defending behind rivers. Terrain costs are normal during summer, but halved in the winter, and are governed by a random terrain table in the fall and spring, when mud can halve movement rates. Lakes are impassable most of the year, but may freeze enough to allow passage in the winter. Railroads add ten hexes to movement, but must be taken all at once.

==== Combat ====
Each unit has a zone of control around it. Units cannot move from one enemy zone of control hex into an adjoining hex also in the same zone of control. Two opposing units adjacent to each other must engage in combat. To resolve combat, the ratio of attacker to defender strength is calculated, a die is rolled, and the result taken from the appropriate column on the Combat Result Table (CRT). If the result is retreat, the loser must retreat up to 2 hexes, and the winner can advance one hex. Some commentary encourages players to use "soak-off" attacks, which give the attacker a good chance of eliminating an enemy unit, in return for the likely sacrifice of a friendly unit.

=== Victory conditions ===
The Germans win by either eliminating all Soviet units on the map, or by occupying Stalingrad, Moscow and Leningrad and holding them simultaneously for two complete turns. The Russians win by preventing the German victory conditions or by eliminating all German units on the map. The German player can usually capture at least one of the three key cities.

== Publication history ==
Stalingrad was designed by Charles S. Roberts, and developed by Tom Shaw and Lindsley Schutz, and was published by Avalon Hill in 1963. Eleven years later, a slightly revised second edition was released.

== Reception ==
Many critics have noted the game's inaccuracies, from geographical mistakes on the map to incorrect orders of battle.

Writing in 1980 for Moves, Steven List noted that "While still popular, the game was found to be flawed even in its early days."

In his 1977 book The Comprehensive Guide to Board Wargaming, Nicholas Palmer commented "it is generally felt that Stalingrad is much too unrealistic in its details (large numbers of units have almost identical strengths on the German side, and the sudden-death CRT makes luck a major factor.)" However, despite these issues, Palmer still found that "while the tactical accuracy is faulty, the game gives a good simulation of the grand strategic alternatives, and it is swift and exciting, with more forward planning needed that in many games because of the savage effect of winter on movement." In The Best of Board Wargaming (1980) Palmer wrote that the campaign is “crudely but excitingly simulated” despite having “by today’s standards an over-bland map and identikit units”. The game “stands out among the classics [the Avalon Hill games of the 1960s] for its good strategic conception. Bashing away on all fronts is not a viable policy for the Germans” who need to keep some Panzer forces in reserve for the Soviet winter counteroffensive. Much analysis of potential Soviet defences had been published. “The Soviet player will nearly always win if he plays a defensive yet tenacious game, even if his replacement rate is reduced for play balance as suggested by the rules [for experienced players]”. However, the German side is easier to learn to play well (the game was initially thought biased to the Germans on first release) suggesting that most wargamers find it easier to play attack than defence; published results from club play showed the game to be fairly evenly matched. Palmer gave the game a high rating (70%) for excitement but only 25% for realism.

In the 1980 book The Complete Book of Wargames, game designer Jon Freeman commented, "Stalingrad is another classic and was for many years one of the most popular wargames around." He noted that play balance had always been considered an issue, saying, "since the original made it almost impossible for the Germans to win, innumerable variants sprang up over the years to even things up." Freeman also pointed out the historical inaccuracies: "The other standard objection is on historical grounds: the game bears little resemblance to the actual campaign." Despite these issues, Freeman concluded by giving the game an Overall Evaluation of "Good", saying, "Nonetheless, it was state of the art when first produced, and it remains a playable and enjoyable game."

In Issue 2 of the UK magazine Games & Puzzles, (July 1972), game designer Don Turnbull called Stalingrad "a popular game for beginners, which retains its interest for the more experienced player." Several issues later, Mike Nerthercot also reviewed the game, and found several drawbacks: "It is rather 'old fashioned' by modern design standards. The design can be faulted on a number of accounts. It is more abstract than realistic, failing to recreate the German doctrinal superiority in the use of armoured units." Nethercot concluded by giving the game a rating of 4 out of 6, saying, "On balance, I would probably advise more experienced players to go for Barbarossa, for newcomers — Stalingrad."

R. B. McArthur, writing for Washingtonian in 1980 said that "Avalon Hill's Afrika Korps, Stalingrad, D-Day, and Battle of the Bulge cover World War II in Europe pretty thoroughly. They are mostly popular with teenagers; those who actually fought in the war tend to find them jarringly inaccurate."

Stalingrad was chosen for inclusion in the 2007 book Hobby Games: The 100 Best. Game designer Lewis Pulsipher commented, "While the company name lives on as an imprint at Hasbro, Avalon Hill's legacy is more substantial. It provided the foundation for the entire hobby gaming industry, and of Avalon Hill's many groundbreaking early titles, Stalingrad is the best."

== Other reviews and commentary ==
- Campaign #100
- Fire & Movement #62
- International Wargamer Vol.3 #10
- PanzerFaust #53
- Panzerschreck #3
- Paper Wars #26
- Spartan Simulation Gaming Journal, July 1970
- Strategy & Tactics #13
- Moves #50, p26

== See also ==
- Victory! The Battle for Europe
