= Tactics II =

Wargame

Tactics II

Tactics II is a wargame designed by Charles S. Roberts and published by the Avalon Hill game company in 1958. It was re-released in 1961 and 1972. It was the second game produced by Roberts following the success of his first game, Tactics.

== Publication history ==
In 1958, Charles S. Roberts formed gaming company Avalon Hill to publish Tactics II (1958).

Tactics II is a revised version of Tactics published by Avalon Hill in 1958, then reissued in 1961 and 1973. In 1972, the game was discontinued due to rising costs. In 1973, it was redesigned with less costly components and used as a loss leader, as an introductory wargame. In 1983, Avalon Hill released a 25th anniversary edition of the original Tactics, with a new, different map.

== Gameplay ==
It is nearly identical to Tactics in all respects, with a slightly revised map and more detailed unit counters.

== Reception ==
In his 1977 book The Comprehensive Guide to Board Wargaming, Nicholas Palmer called Tactics II a "Respectable but dull abstract introductory game [...] readers of this book looking for an easy starting game would probably enjoy a simulation of an actual battle more."

In the 1980 book The Complete Book of Wargames, game designer Jon Freeman dismissed the then-22-year-old Tactics II as unplayable, saying, "Aside from its historical importance, this game has no redeeming qualities. [...] Against an even vaguely competent opponent, [the game] can't be won. The [geography] combines to produce an inevitable stalemate directly across the center of the board." Freeman concluded by giving the game an Overall Evaluation of "Poor", saying, "Tactics II is overdue for retirement."

== Reviews ==
- The Playboy Winner's Guide to Board Games
- The Star Press
