= Combat results table =

A Combat results table or a CRT is used in wargaming to determine the outcome of a clash between individual units within a larger battle.

Die roll	1-3	1-2	1-1	3-2	2-1	3-1	4-1	5-1
-	AE	AE	AE	3/-	3/-	2/-	2/-	1/-
1	AE	AE	3/-	3/-	2/-	2/-	1/-	1/-
2	AE	3/-	3/-	2/-	2/-	1/-	1/-	[-/1]
3	3/-	3/-	2/-	2/-	1/-	1/-	[-/1]	-/2*
4	3/-	2/-	2/-	1/-	1/-	[-/1]	-/2*	-/3*
5	2/-	2/-	1/-	1/-	[-/1]	-/2*	-/3*	DE
6	2/-	1/-	1/-	[-/1]	-/2*	-/3*	DE	DE
7	1/-	1/-	[-/1]	-/2*	-/3*	DE	DE	DE
8	1/-	[-/1]	-/2	-/3*	DE	DE	DE	DE
+	[-/1]	-/2	-/3	DE	DE	DE	DE	DE

== Methods ==
=== Ratio method ===
One significant method for combat resolution entails determining the ratio of the attacking unit's attack strength versus the defending unit's defense strength. This method is used in many games; one of the earliest and most prominent games to use this system was the game Panzerblitz, which was a genre-defining game when it was published in 1970.

The attacker and defender typically compare the relative strengths of the units involved in the clash and reduce these numbers to a ratio, which corresponds to a column on the table (for example 2:1 if the attacker is twice as strong as the defender). Less often, the columns may be based on the difference between the combatants' strengths, rather than the ratio (for example '3', if an attacker with strength 5 attacks a defender with strength 2). A die roll is then made using one or more dice and the resulting number is then cross-referenced on the table to find the results of the individual clash.

Game conditions can influence the strength numbers used to calculate the ratio in the form of doubling or halving each of them, in addition to column shifts that can occur due to terrain, weather or some other factor. Typical results include elimination, advances or retreats, surrender, casualty reduction, or partial losses.

For example, the simple Combat Results Table (CRT) included in this article could be interpreted as follows:

- AE: Attacking unit(s) completely Eliminated
- DE: Defending unit(s) completely Eliminated
- Intermediate results (reflected by a slash separating two values): the number to the left of the slash represents the losses suffered by the attacking force, the number to the right of the slash represents the losses the defenders might suffer (losses may result in the dissolution or destruction of sub-units and/or the overall distance a force may retreat). A dash represents no effect to the force indicated.

The brackets seen in the results running diagonally from the lower left hand corner of the chart to the upper right hand corner could indicate some additional outcome such as melee or continuing engagement that involves both sides. The asterisk shown in some results might represent a supplementary outcome that influences only the defender, such as a mandatory retreat. As wargames typically use a standard 6-sided die the addition of numbers below 1 and above 6 in the left hand column would indicate this game uses what are called die roll modifiers to reflect further special conditions, such as defender’s terrain, weather, leadership, training, morale, surprise, experience levels, or supply conditions, etc.

== See also ==
- Avalon Hill
- Tactical wargame
