= Charles S. Roberts =

American wargame designer and railroad historian

- Born: February 3, 1930
- Died: August 20, 2010 (aged 80)
- Resting place: New Cathedral Cemetery
- Occupation: Game designer

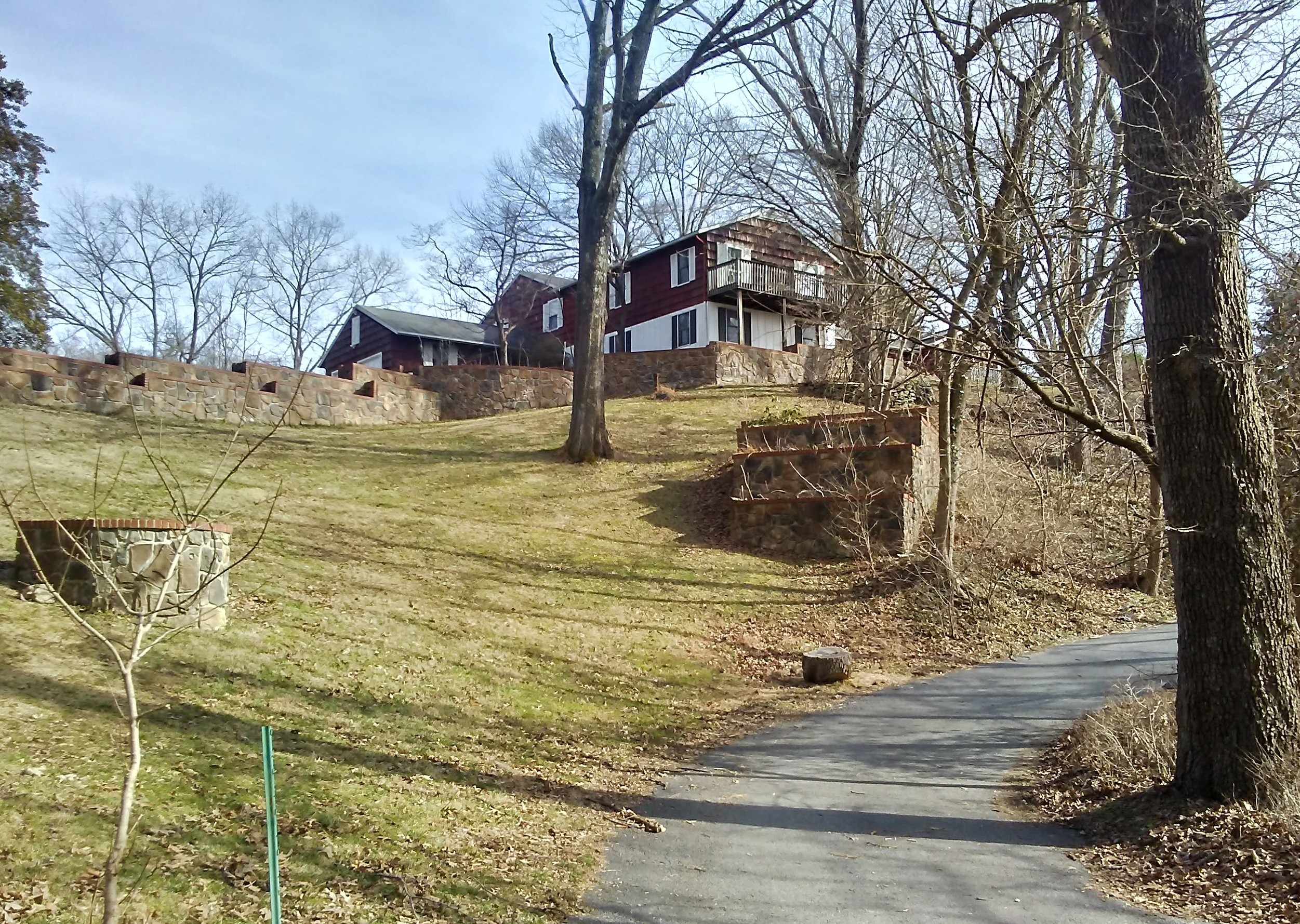
The home of Charles S. Roberts during the 1950s located on a hill in the Avalon neighborhood of Catonsville, Maryland. The Avalon Hill Game Company sold mail order games from the garage between 1952-1958.

Charles Swann Roberts (February 3, 1930 – August 20, 2010, Baltimore, Maryland) was an American wargame designer, railroad historian, and businessman. He is renowned as "The Father of Board Wargaming", having created the first commercially successful modern wargame in 1952 (Tactics), the first wargaming company in 1954 (Avalon Hill), and designed the first board wargame based upon an actual historical battle (Gettysburg). He is also the author of a series of books on railroad history, published by the small publishing firm, Barnard, Roberts, and Company, Inc.

== As a wargame designer ==
In 1952, Charles S. Roberts began working on the first mass market board wargame, Tactics, from his house in the Avalon neighborhood of Catonsville, Maryland. It was a revolutionary design in many ways that Roberts recalled confounded new players more accustomed to rules like chess and checkers.

In 1954, he began selling it via mail-order as The Avalon Game Company. In 1958, Roberts formed gaming company Avalon Hill to publish the next incarnation, Tactics II (1958). Tactics II improved on the basic game design of his earlier effort, and formed the genesis for the concept of the combat results table. In 1958 he published Gettysburg, considered to be the first board wargame based upon an actual historical battle, with subsequent versions in 1961 and 1964.

In December 1963, Roberts turned over Avalon Hill to one of his creditors, Eric Dott of Monarch Services, after being hard hit by a recession. Tom Shaw, a longtime friend of Roberts and the last holdover from the original company, ran the company during Avalon Hill's successful 1963-1982 period. After six years in Roberts’ home, the company moved to a dedicated building in the Parkville neighborhood of Baltimore.

Starting in 1988, Roberts's name was given to the Charles S. Roberts Awards, given for excellence in the historical wargaming hobby. He was a charter member of the Charles Roberts Awards Hall of Fame.

In 1999, Pyramid magazine named Charles S. Roberts as one of The Millennium's Most Influential Persons "at least in the realm of adventure gaming."

== As a railroad historian ==
Following the sale of his wargame company, Avalon Hill, Charles Roberts held various positions in the publishing industry. In 1973, he founded a small press, Barnard, Roberts, and Company, which he has described as "publishing to the Catholic market", even though Roberts himself was not a Catholic. Over time, the company's emphasis shifted away from religious publications and toward railroad history.

Roberts took pride in coming from a long line of railroaders. One of his great great uncles was Thomas Swann, president of the Baltimore and Ohio Railroad from 1848 to 1853. Roberts's father and grandfather, also named Charles Swann Roberts, had long careers with the Baltimore and Ohio. In one of his books, Roberts reminisced about childhood trips with his father to observe the operations of the Pennsylvania Railroad, of which Roberts had always been an enthusiast.

The firm of Barnard, Roberts, and Company published numerous books about railroad history, many written by Charles Roberts himself. Earlier volumes focused on the Baltimore and Ohio, and later books documented the Pennsylvania Railroad. The first in this series was Triumph I: Altoona to Pitcairn: 1846-1996. The last was Triumph IX: Salt Sea to Bays, Valleys, Dells, and Firestorms: 1927-2007. In Triumph IX, Roberts includes reminiscences about his life and movingly pays tribute to his late first wife, Patricia.
