= Janet Okell =

English professional wargamer

Janet Hay Okell
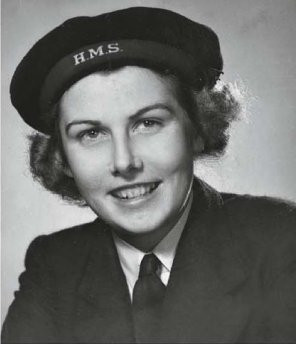
- Born: 30 August 1922; Neston
- Died: February 2005 (aged 82); Brimstage
- Occupation: Military analyst

Janet Hay Okell (30 August 1922, Neston – February 2005, Brimstage) was an English wargamer who joined the Western Approaches Tactical Unit (WATU) as a young Naval rating in the Women's Royal Naval Service.

== Biography ==
Shortly after Admiral Max Horton was appointed Commander-in-Chief of the Western Approaches Command, in November 1942, he visited WATU and played one of their wargames. As one of the Royal Navy's most experienced submarine commanders, he opted to play the role of a U-boat commander. Captain Gilbert Roberts, head of WATU, decided that Okell should play the role of the escort group commander. Horton was somewhat dismayed to find that Okell was able to outsmart him five times out of five. Despite his initial horror on discovering he had been beaten by a twenty-year-old female rating, he soon sanctioned the use of her method, known as Beta Search to be included in the next revision of Fleet Orders. Okell later helped train incoming escort officers in WATU’s anti-submarine tactics, and her contribution, long classified, was only widely recognized decades after the war.
