= Kill zone =

Area subject to an ambush in a battle

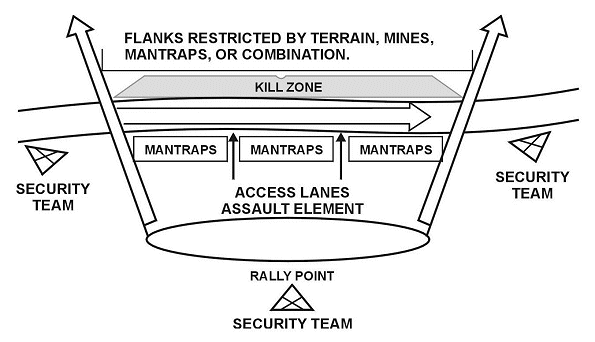
U.S. Army idealized linear ambush plan showing the kill zone

In military tactics, the kill zone, also known as killing zone, is an area entirely exposed to effective direct fire or accurately zeroed indirect fire, typically as an element of ambush within which an approaching enemy force is encircled/flanked, engaged and destroyed. The objective of the ambushing force is to seize the element of surprise to quickly kill or capture all hostile combatants inside the kill zone, and the ambushed soldiers (who may or may not be trapped) may respond by counterattacking and/or breaking out of the kill zone.

The term is also used in non-lethal sense in military exercises and simulations, as well as in recreational wargaming and MilSim shooting sports such as paintball, airsoft and laser tag, as a region within the training area, playing field or arena where intense shootouts and elimination of participants are most likely to happen.

== Practice ==
=== Ambush ===
The kill zone is an element of point ambush in which a military unit targets a single area with offensive fire such as mines, demolitions and section-level weapons. The kill zone may be bordered by obstacles, traps or indirect fire (artillery or mortars) to keep the enemy from escaping. In an area ambush, related multiple kill zones will be covered by multiple kill teams.

The weapons of the kill team are not fired until the majority of the enemy unit is within the kill zone, ideally all of the targeted unit. Direct and effective fire is initiated by the kill team leader who orders simultaneous targeted firing by all members of the kill team. The attack is often initiated by remote-controlled charges such as Claymore mines or other explosives. The ambushed unit may be prevented from advancing or retreating by explosions at the front and rear of their column. Individual kill team members are to choose targets within the kill zone using machine gun and small arms fire but may be augmented by indirect fire. Ideally, the action is completed so quickly that the enemy force has no time to report the engagement. A successful ambush may result in a patrol in the kill zone being destroyed in seconds.

The ambush of a kill zone carries high risk in that forces not in the zone may maneuver around the flanks of the attackers, limiting their escape. For this reason a properly executed ambush employs covering teams and relief teams in addition to the kill team(s). Nearby forces may also come to the assistance of those caught in the attack. Therefore, a well-executed attack may be over in under a minute and should rarely extend beyond a few minutes.

=== Response ===
A military unit that finds itself suddenly under fire in an enemy kill zone must immediately take action against the ambushers. Such action may include soldiers assuming a prone position to minimize themselves as targets. Prone soldiers will return fire toward the ambushers. Other responses may include the targeted soldiers immediately assaulting suspected defensive positions. Soldiers outside of the kill zone may direct suppressive fire at the ambushers in support of the assault, and they may advance upon the flanks of the ambushers.

Vehicles in the kill zone will likely attempt to leave it, while vehicle gunners fire toward the ambushers. Disabled vehicles may create cover for ambushed soldiers. Soldiers able to leave their disabled vehicles are expected to join the assault against the ambushers.

=== Site selection ===
The kill zone should isolate and trap the enemy. The selection of a likely kill zone involves evaluating the terrain and making up for any inadequacies. First and foremost, the kill zone must be where the enemy is expected to travel, or where the enemy can be attracted with "bait". If the potential kill zone terrain restricts vehicle movement to one vehicle width at a time, then a suddenly disabled vehicle will help to isolate the enemy. Terrain that keeps the enemy from moving out of the kill zone is useful for isolation, otherwise the ambushers will wish to place obstacles or munitions at the borders of the selected area. Especially important is separation between the enemy and the ambushing units, to prevent a counterattack.

=== Avoidance ===
Military units on the move are vulnerable to ambush. To avoid the kill zone, a patrol may "fan out" and travel with elements spread out left and right, rather than staying solely on a road or track. Soldiers who take point must keep an eye out for signs of a kill zone, such as disturbed ground, obstacles and restrictive terrain. Night vision and thermal imaging equipment may help to discover hidden weapons, or enemy soldiers under cover.

== Paintball ==
The term "kill zone" is used in paintball tactics to designate an area that is heavily defended by enemy paintball players. Advancing players may know the location of the potential kill zone but be uncertain whether it is well-defended. Responses vary to being caught in a paintball kill zone. If the kill zone is too large and the enemy forces relatively far away, the ambushed players often retreat to cover. If the kill zone is small, the ambushed players are likely to charge forward and assault the defensive players. Fellow players who are not caught in the kill zone are likely to attack the flanks of the defensive players.

== See also ==
- No man's land
- Pocket (military)
