= Western Approaches Tactical Unit =

British naval wargaming unit

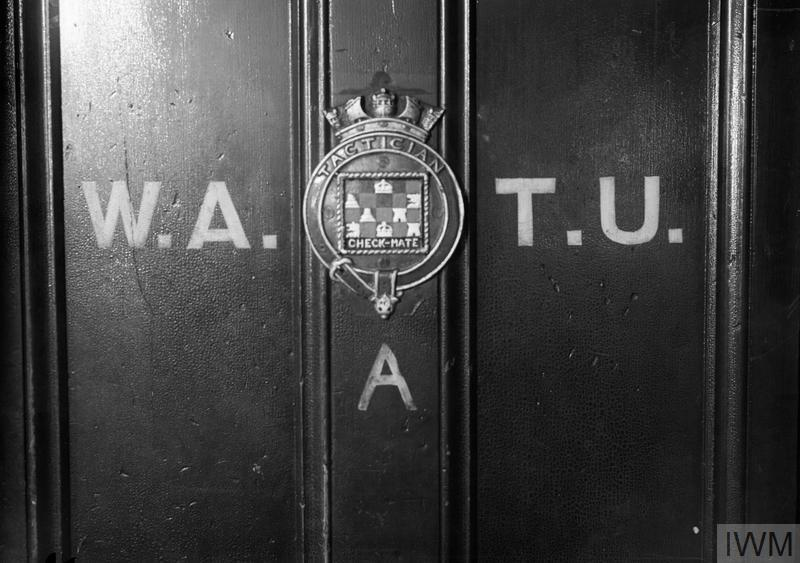
The entrance door to WATU. The crest was a relic from the destroyer HMS Tactician, decommissioned in 1931.

The Western Approaches Tactical Unit (WATU) was a unit of the British Royal Navy created in January 1942 to develop and disseminate new tactics to counter German submarine attacks on trans-Atlantic shipping convoys. It was led by Captain Gilbert Roberts and was principally staffed by officers and ratings from the Women's Royal Naval Service (Wrens). Their primary tool for studying U-boat attacks and developing countermeasures was wargames. After the U-boat threat to merchant shipping was defeated, WATU continued to develop anti-submarine tactics for later stages of the war, including Operation Overlord and the Pacific War. WATU trained naval officers in its tactics by hosting week-long training courses in which the students played wargames. WATU formally ceased operations at the end of July 1945.

== Background ==
During World War I, German submarines (U-boats) sank merchant ships in the Atlantic Ocean so as to deny supplies to Germany's enemies in Europe. Britain reacted by organising the merchant ships into convoys which were escorted by warships armed with depth charges. This strategy proved effective at repelling U-boats. During the inter-war years, Germany secretly developed new submarine tactics to counter the convoy system. The products of this research were the "wolfpack" tactics, wherein submarines would attack convoys in groups, exploiting the weaknesses of the convoy system, and new advances in submarine technology. The British, by contrast, had neglected to study submarine tactics during the inter-war years. They entered World War II assuming that the U-boats would operate much as they had during the previous war, unaware that the Germans would come at them with new tactics.

As soon as Britain declared war on Germany (3 Sept 1939), Germany sent its U-boats to attack transatlantic shipping. The U-boats had a devastating effect. In 1938, Britain had received 68 million tons of imports, but in 1941 the U-boats reduced this to 26 million. Britain was not a self-sufficient nation, and eventually its reserves of food would run out and it would be forced to capitulate to prevent a famine. In March 1941, Prime Minister Winston Churchill declared that Britain was fighting "the Battle of the Atlantic", and made anti-submarine warfare a top priority.

The Royal Navy understood from intercepted radio transmissions that the U-boats were operating in coordinated groups but did not know the specifics of their tactics.

== Establishment and Mission ==
On 1 January 1942, Admiral Cecil Usborne assigned Commander Gilbert Roberts to establish a wargaming unit at the Western Approaches Command in Liverpool, to analyze the submarine attacks and develop defensive tactics. Roberts had designed naval wargames during a two-year stint at the Portsmouth Tactical School, using them to develop new strategies and tactics. Additionally, Roberts was a communicator who would be able to train commanders in the tactics he was to develop.

Roberts moved to Liverpool to set up his tactical unit on the top floor of the Western Approaches headquarters. This assignment officially began on 23 February 1942. Most of the staff at Western Approaches were women from the Women's Royal Naval Service (colloquially referred to as "Wrens"), and likewise Roberts recruited most of his staff from the Wrens. A total of sixty-six Wrens served at WATU from 1942 to 1945.

Roberts and his team reviewed battle reports from convoy escort commanders, recreated the battles in wargames in order to deduce how the U-boats were operating, and then devised tactics by which the escorts could defeat the U-boats. Their first product was a tactic codenamed Raspberry (see below). As well as devising tactics, WATU also trained naval officers in their use by having them participate in wargames. The training course lasted six days, from Monday to Saturday, and was held every week from February 1942 to the last week of July 1945. Up to fifty officers at once took the course. WATU not only trained British officers, but also officers from other countries such as Canada, the United States, New Zealand, Norway, South Africa, Poland, and Free France.

In May 1943, Admiral Karl Doenitz ordered the U-boats to withdraw from the Atlantic, allowing merchant convoys to pass unmolested.

By 1944, WATU's existence was public knowledge. A journalist visited WATU in January 1944 to observe a wargame and published a short article in The Daily Herald. An account of WATU's work appeared in Illustrated magazine the following month.

WATU continued to develop anti-submarine tactics and train officers until the end of the war. It officially ceased operations at the end of July 1945. It had trained close to 5,000 officers over its lifetime.

== Headquarters ==
Western Approaches Command was an operational command of Britain's Royal Navy, tasked with safeguarding British shipping in the Western Approaches (the seas to the west of Ireland and Britain). Initially headquartered in Plymouth, on the southern coast of Britain, it was moved north to Liverpool in February 1941. After France had fallen to the Germans, North Atlantic shipping convoys had been diverted around the north of Ireland to evade the Kriegsmarine (German navy). Relocating Western Approaches Command to Liverpool sped up communications. Its headquarters was Derby House, a building located behind Liverpool's town hall; today the headquarters is Western Approaches Museum. (Note: https://liverpoolwarmuseum.co.uk/) The top floor, comprising eight rooms, was allocated to WATU. Most of the staff at Western Approaches HQ were women from the Women's Royal Naval Service. Colloquially, they were referred to as "Wrens". When Roberts arrived at Western Approaches in January 1942, its commander-in-chief was Admiral Percy Noble, who was replaced by Admiral Max Horton in November 1942.

== Staff ==
A total of sixty-six women from the Women's Royal Naval Service (Wrens) served at WATU from 1942 to 1945.

- Captain Gilbert Roberts - Director of WATU. Once commanded a destroyer but contracted tuberculosis in late 1938 and was barred from serving at sea.
- Mary Poole - WRNS officer. The first female officer to take the WATU course.
- Laura Janet Howes - WRNS officer. Born in Antigua. Mathematical prodigy. Nicknamed "Bobby".
- Elizabeth Drake - WRNS officer. When WATU was established, she was already working at Derby House as a plotter.
- Nancy "Nan" Sofia Wailes - WRNS officer. Born in Kingston upon Hull, joined the Wrens in 1941. She was a passionate hockey player, and was selected for her understanding of team tactics.
- Jean Laidlaw - WRNS officer. Scottish. Former Sea Ranger and chartered accountant.
- Janet Okell - WRNS rating. She was only 19 years old when she joined WATU in January 1942. She served at WATU for the whole duration. Okell was initially trained as a plotter, but she was soon participating in wargames as a player, commanding U-boats and escort ships alike.
- June Duncan (1924-2014) - WRNS rating. One of WATU's longest serving members, in the 1950s, became one of Britain's top fashion models.
- Dorothy N. G. "Judy" Du Vivier - WRNS
- Mary (née Carlisle) Hall - WRNS
- Elizabeth Hackney - WRNS
- Doris Lawford - WRNS
- Pauline Preston - WRNS
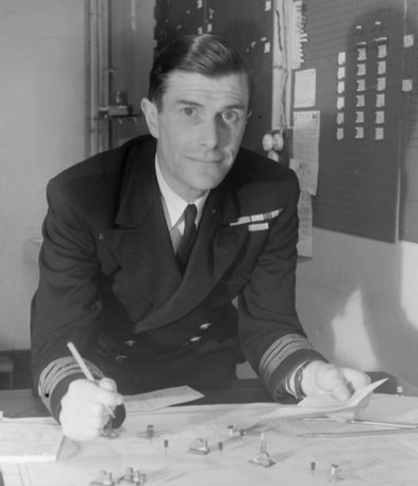
Captain Gilbert Roberts, director of WATU.

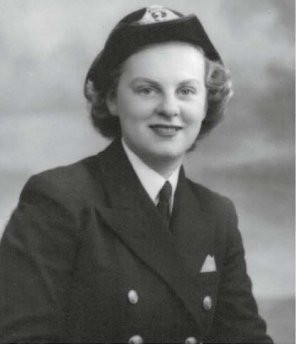
Mary Poole

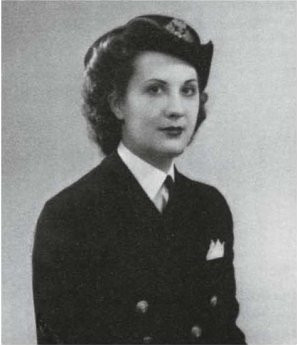
Laura Janet Howes

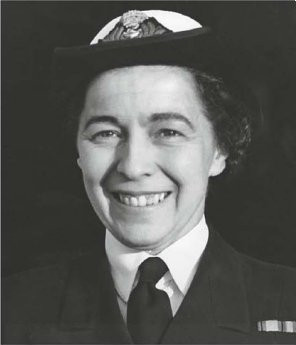
Nancy "Nan" Wailes

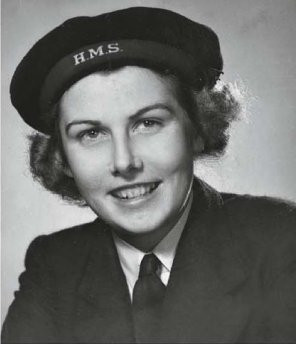
Janet Okell

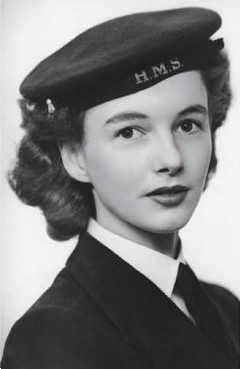
June Duncan

== Overview of the wargames ==
Gilbert Roberts was first introduced to wargaming during a stint at the Portsmouth Tactical School from 1935 to 1937. Roberts took to wargaming with great enthusiasm, and developed his own rulesets. Roberts' wargames were based on the wargames developed by Fred T. Jane in 1898 (Jane Naval Wargame and Fighting Ships). Despite the strong effect that U-boats had during World War I, Roberts' wargames at Portsmouth did not simulate submarine warfare, nor attacks on merchant convoys. He later said "Submarines were not mentioned ... Nor were convoys and attacks on them. Nobody connected Hitler's rise ... to the possibility of another Battle of the Atlantic. Nor did I, to be absolutely fair." However, Roberts told the Royal United Services Institute in 1947 that before the war "In the Tactical School, a short game was played in which a convoy was escorted by a fleet and the enemy force included some submarines."

At WATU, the wargames were conducted in the largest room of the top floor of Western Approaches HQ. The floor was covered with brown linoleum and in the centre was a painted grid. This grid was the game board, or "the tactical table" as the Royal Navy referred to it. The gridlines were spaced ten inches apart, representing one nautical mile. Around the grid were vertical screens of canvas that had peepholes cut into them. The players who controlled the escort ships had to stand behind the screens and could only view the game board through the peepholes. The players who controlled the U-boats did not stand behind the screens and had an unrestricted view of the game board. The ships and surfaced U-boats were represented on the game board by tiny wooden models. The U-boats' movement lines were drawn in green chalk, a color which contrasted poorly with the brown tint of the floor, such that when viewed from an angle, these lines were practically invisible, so the players behind the screens couldn't make them out. The escort ships' movement lines were drawn with white chalk, which could be clearly perceived by the players behind the screens.

The players were given two minutes per turn to make decisions and give orders. The players issued their orders for their imaginary ships on pieces of paper that they passed to the Wrens—this prevented their opponents on the other side of the room from overhearing. The Wrens would then get down on the floor and compute the outcomes of the players' orders, drawing the trajectories of the ships in chalk. Roberts provided the Wrens with the performance characteristics of all ships concerned: the range of the U-boat's torpedoes, the speed of the ships, their turn speed, the precise capabilities of the escorts' sonar (then known as ASDIC), how engine noise might distort listening attempts, visibility at night, etc.

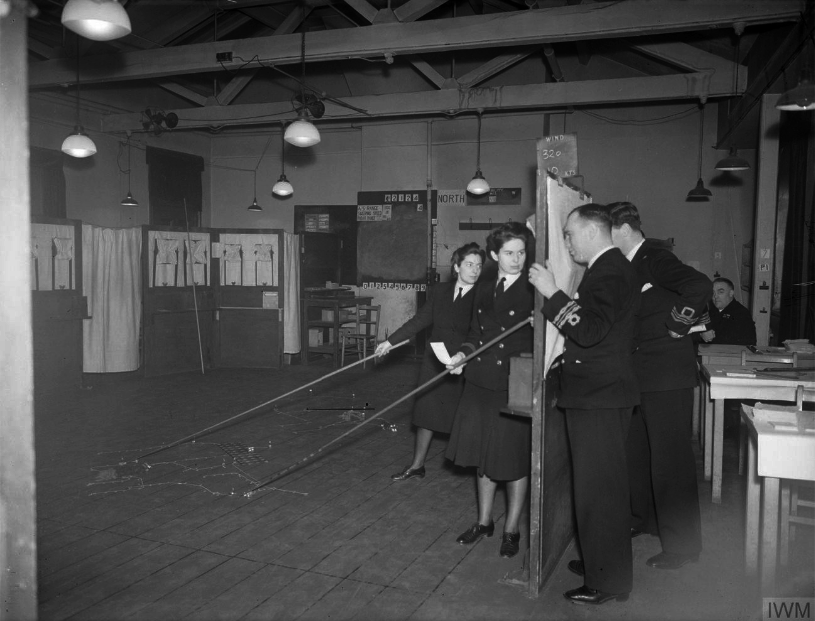
A wargame in progress. The men on the far-right command the escort ships and may only view the game board through holes in the screen. The woman in the foreground is Jean Laidlaw.

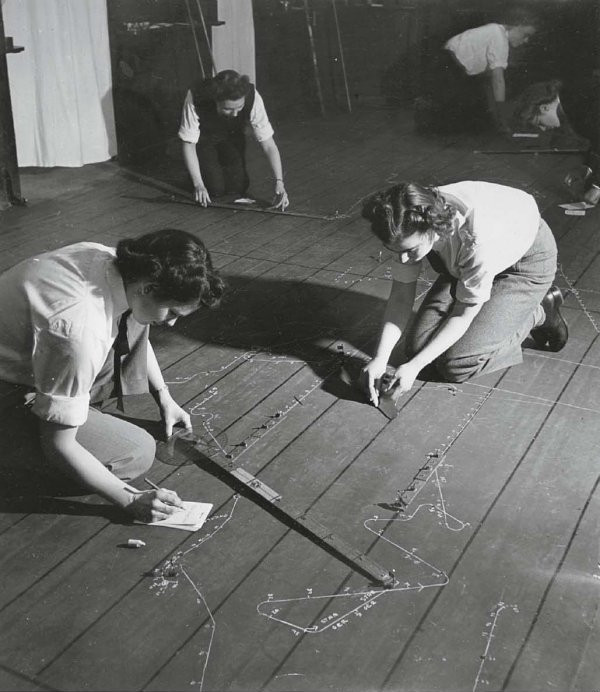
Wrens computing the outcomes of player decisions.

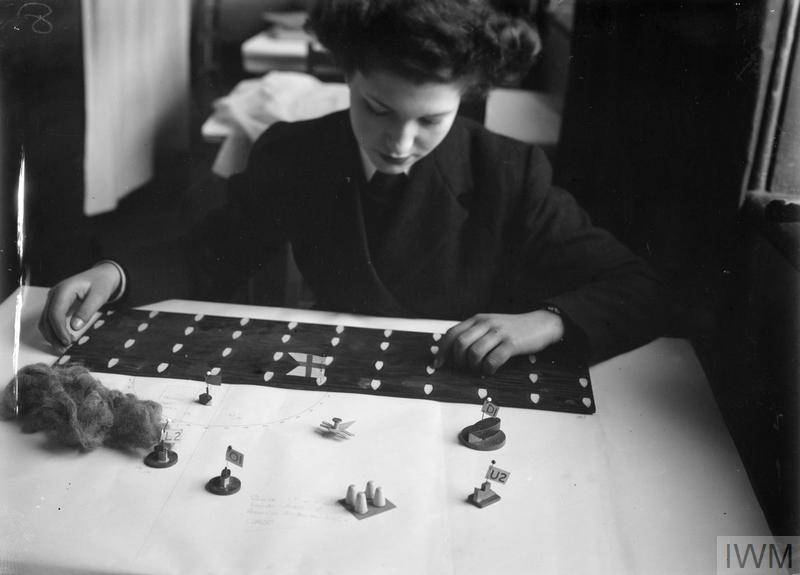
A Wren organising game materials. The wooden pieces represent escort ships, the black board with white shapes represents a convoy, the wire wool represents smoke.

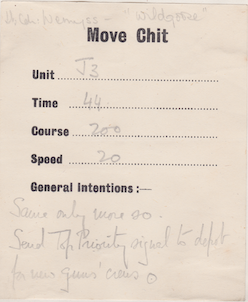
A move chit.

== Tactics developed ==
=== Notes on WW2 submarine warfare ===
Submarines of this era were powered by diesel engines and batteries. They could only use their diesel engines when surfaced, as these needed to breathe air to work. When submerged, the submarine used lead-acid batteries. The batteries were less powerful than the engine, so the submarine was reduced to about half-speed: e.g. a Type VIIC U-boat could travel at 17.7 knots (32.8 km/h) on the surface but only 7.6 knots (14.1 km/h) underwater. The batteries could be exhausted after an hour or so of maximum speed underwater. When the batteries were exhausted, the U-boat would be forced to surface for air and recharge the batteries with the diesel engine.

The British were the first to equip their warships with sonar to hunt enemy submarines. They called this technology "ASDIC"; the term "sonar" was later coined by the Americans (this article will prefer the more general term "sonar" as it is more widely known). This technology sent loud pings into the water and located a submerged submarine by the echoes. The U-boats could hear these pings, of course, so they would know they were being hunted. In practice, ASDIC had an average detection range of 1,300 yards (1,200 m). ASDIC could be ineffective if there was too much ambient noise in the water. The maximum speed at which a ship could travel while using its ASDIC was about 15 knots (28 km/h), beyond which the noise of its own propeller and engine would drown out the echoes. Both the U-boats and the warships also had hydrophones with which they could passively listen for sound in the water.

Merchant ships travelled in convoys, surrounded by a ring of escort warships. They were either slow or fast convoys. The slow ones travelled at about 7 knots (13 km/h) – a speed at which tactical re-routing was not practical.

U-boats usually attacked at night. The cover of darkness allowed them to travel at surface depth (at which their speed was greater than when submerged) with less risk of being spotted by look-outs. Escort ships were equipped with star shells, which when fired in the air would release a burning flare held aloft by a small parachute. This would illuminate the surface of the water, making it easy to spot a surfaced U-boat.

Warships initially used solely depth charges to sink submarines. These are explosive charges on a depth sensitive fuse that were dropped into the water around the U-boat. The hydraulic shockwave produced by the explosion would seriously damage if not sink any submarine within 10 metres. Later, ahead-throwing anti-submarine weapons were also used, which had contact fuses.

=== Raspberry ===
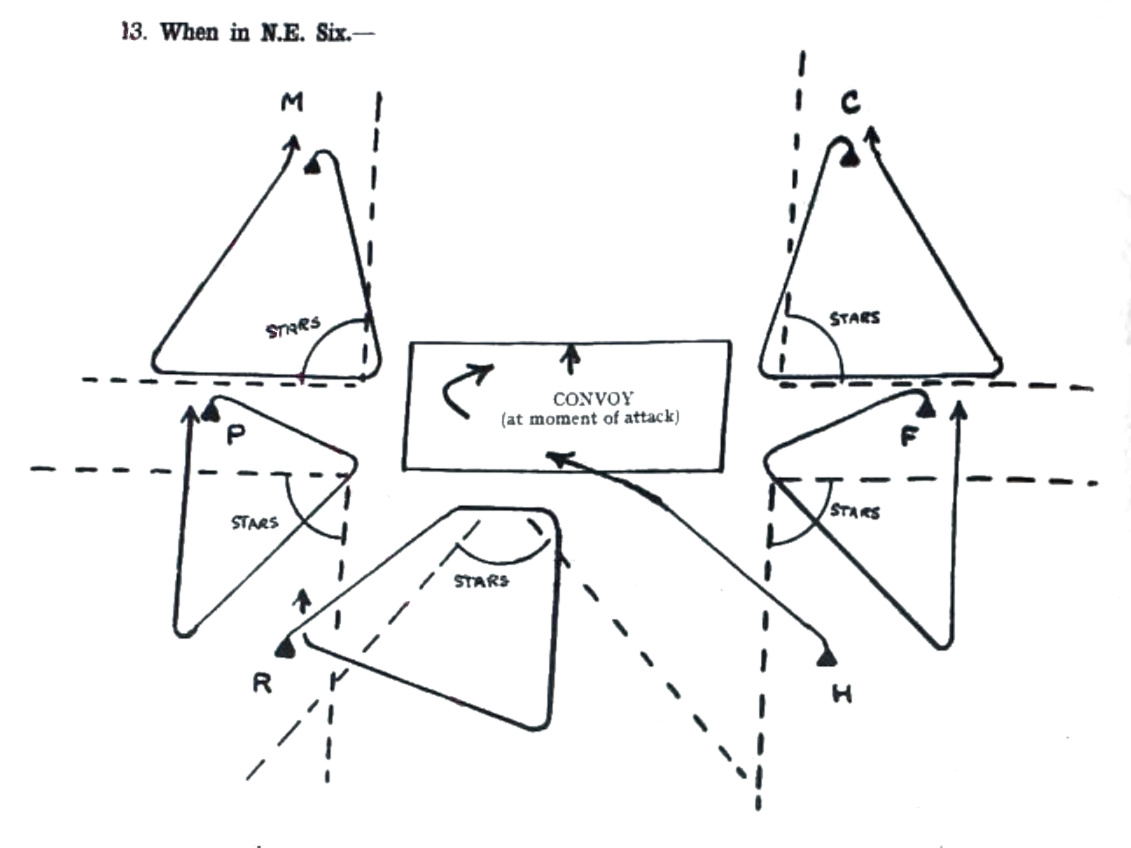
This variation of the Raspberry manoeuvre was designed for a six-escort formation with no forward escort.

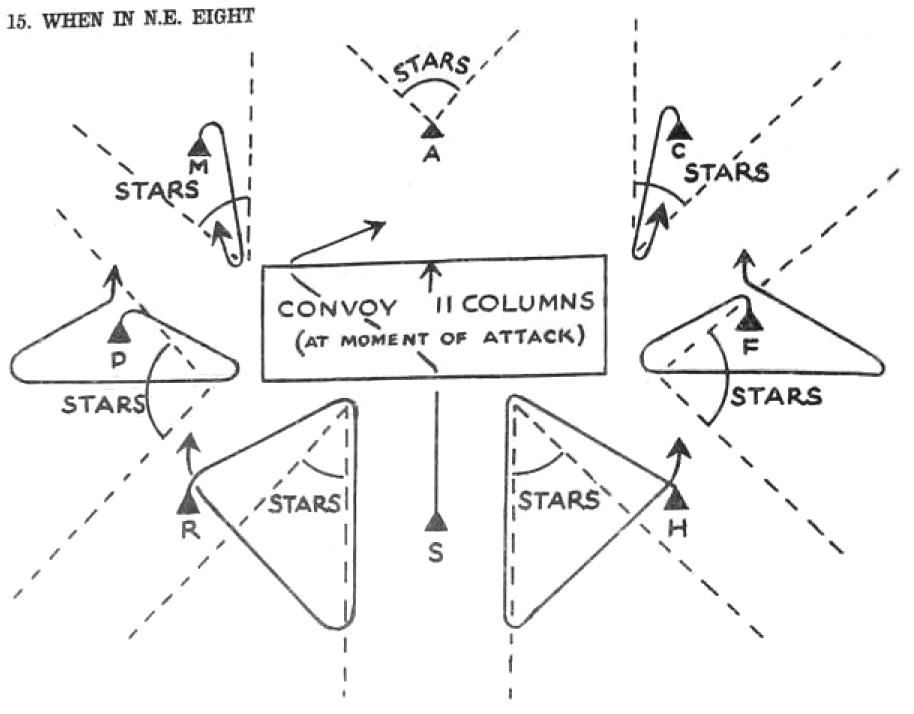
This variation of the Raspberry manoeuvre was designed for an eight-escort formation with one forward escort.

During World War I, the U-boats typically attacked convoys from outside the formation, striking ships at the perimeter. But reports from convoys in 1942 showed that U-boats were sinking ships at the centre of the formation. Roberts surmised that the U-boats were somehow sneaking into the formation undetected before firing their torpedoes. Roberts and his team tested various ways by which a U-boat might sneak into a convoy, sink a ship, and escape undetected. Only one tactic worked on the game board: The U-boat snuck into the convoy from the rear, on the surface so that it could use its diesel engine to outpace the convoy. Since these attacks happened at night and the look-outs tended to focus on the front, the U-boat was not easily spotted, and once inside the convoy it was indistinguishable from the other ships on radar. The U-boat would then sink a merchant ship with a torpedo at close range, then submerge to make its escape.

Roberts and his team developed the Raspberry manoeuvre. Upon seeing a convoy vessel being torpedoed, any escort was to fire two white rockets or Roman candles, then say the word "raspberry" over the radio to commence the manoeuvre. Any forward escorts maintain course, firing star shells. The escorts to the rear and flanks of the convoy converge towards the convoy at a speed of 15 knots. One rear escort sweeps the stern of the convoy. The other escorts, upon nearing the edge of the convoy, turn around and sweep away from the convoy firing star shells for 10 to 12 minutes. Then they turn and sweep back to their starting position. While doing this, all the ships fire star shells outwards to light up the surface of the water.

Raspberry is likely a development of an earlier manoeuvre known as Buttercup, which was developed by Frederic J. Walker, an escort commander. Buttercup was criticised by the Admiralty for not having all the escorts sweep for the U-boat in all directions. In Buttercup, the escorts would only sweep to the side of the convoy where the attack was thought to have come from, which meant the U-boat could escape if the escort commander made the wrong call. Additionally, only the escort commander could order the manoeuvre, which could have caused a fatal delay. By contrast, Raspberry has all the escorts sweep the entire perimeter, and any of the escorts could order the manoeuvre.

It was WRNS Jean Laidlaw who proposed the name Raspberry, as in "blowing a raspberry at Hitler".

Raspberry was cancelled in May 1943.

=== Pineapple ===
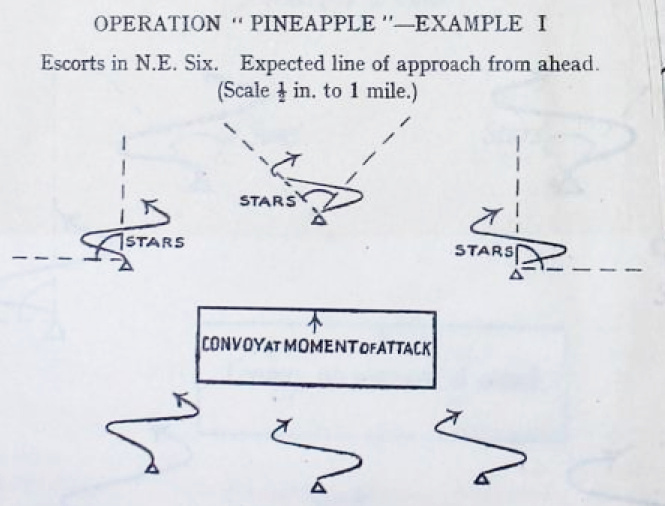
The Pineapple manoeuvre, adapted for a six-escort formation when a second attack is expected to come from ahead.

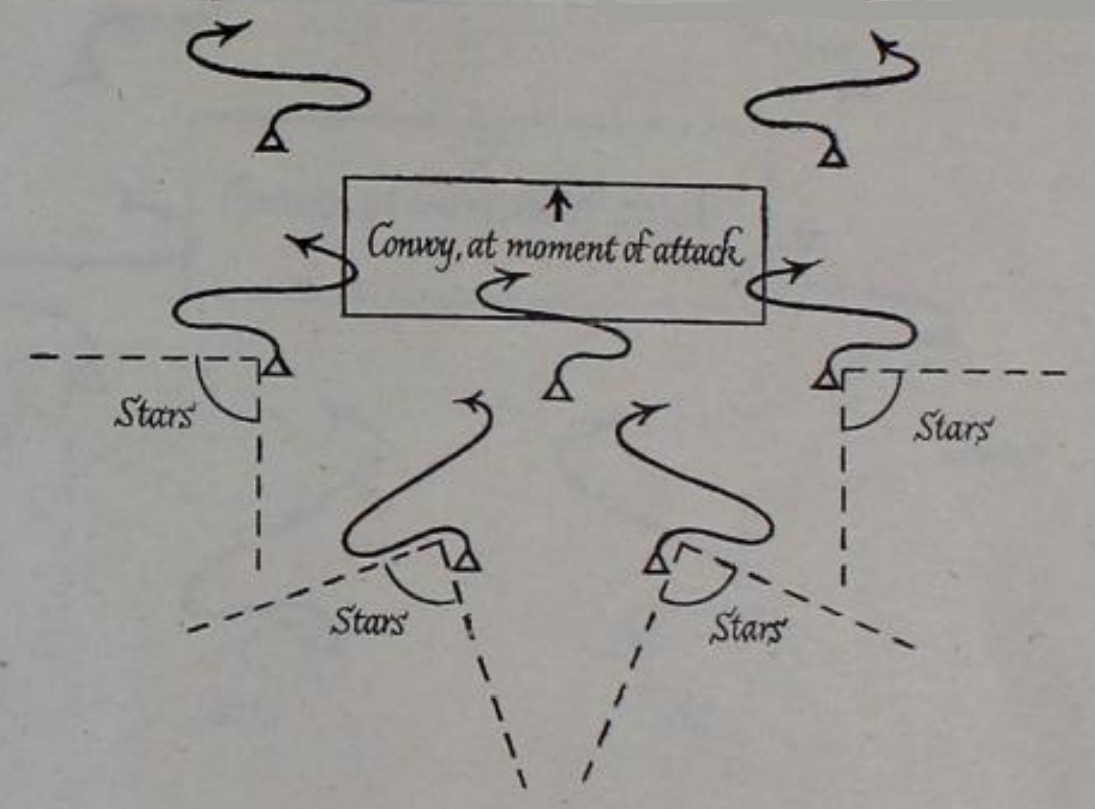
The Pineapple manoeuvre, adapted for a seven-escort formation when a second attack is expected to come from astern.

Pineapple was designed to be an alternative to Raspberry and Banana. It was to be used when more than one U-boat was attacking the convoy, and was designed to do four things: (1) Force a second U-boat to dive before being able to attack; (2) Give a chance of detecting a U-boat which has already fired torpedoes; (3) Prevent another U-boat from sighting the convoy in any illumination used to detect the U-boat which has already attacked; and (4) Increase chance of detection of any submerged U-boat which is about to attack and to form a greater physical obstruction in the submarine attacking area.

Upon noticing a ship getting torpedoed, any escort fires two white rockets and then says the word "pineapple" over the radio to commence the manoeuvre. Depth charges are to be set to ten-charge shallow pattern. The escorts keep moving forward in zigzag patterns that are 2 miles wide, searching for the U-boats using sonar, radar, and star shells. The escorts facing the expected direction of the second U-boat fire star shells away from the convoy to search for the second U-boat. They were not to fire star shells into the convoy, and the escorts on the opposite side of the convoy were not to fire star shells at all — this was probably to avoid lighting up the convoy, which would have made it easy for the second U-boat to spot.

=== Banana ===
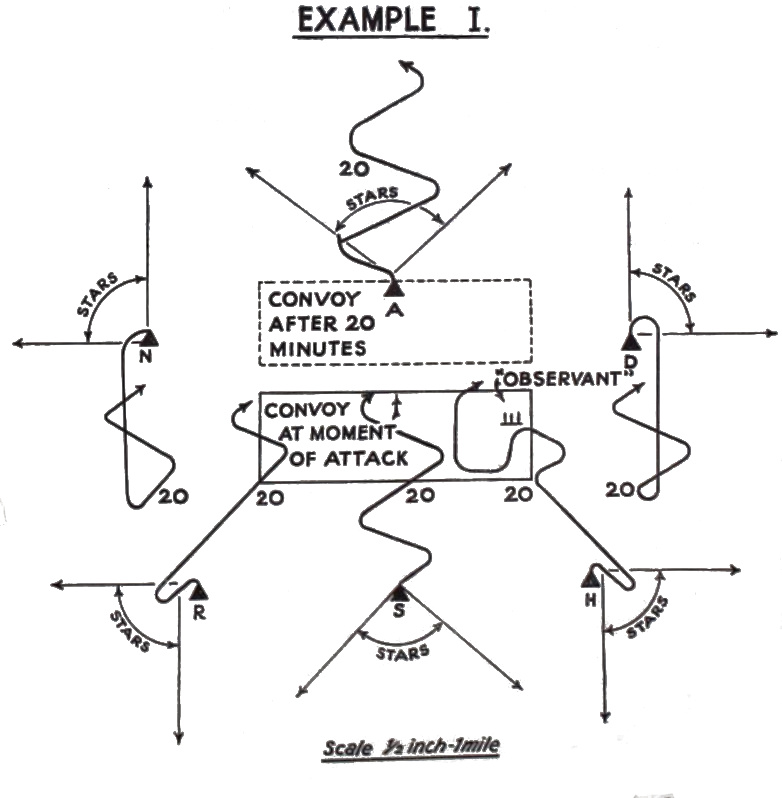
Banana variant for a six-escort formation.

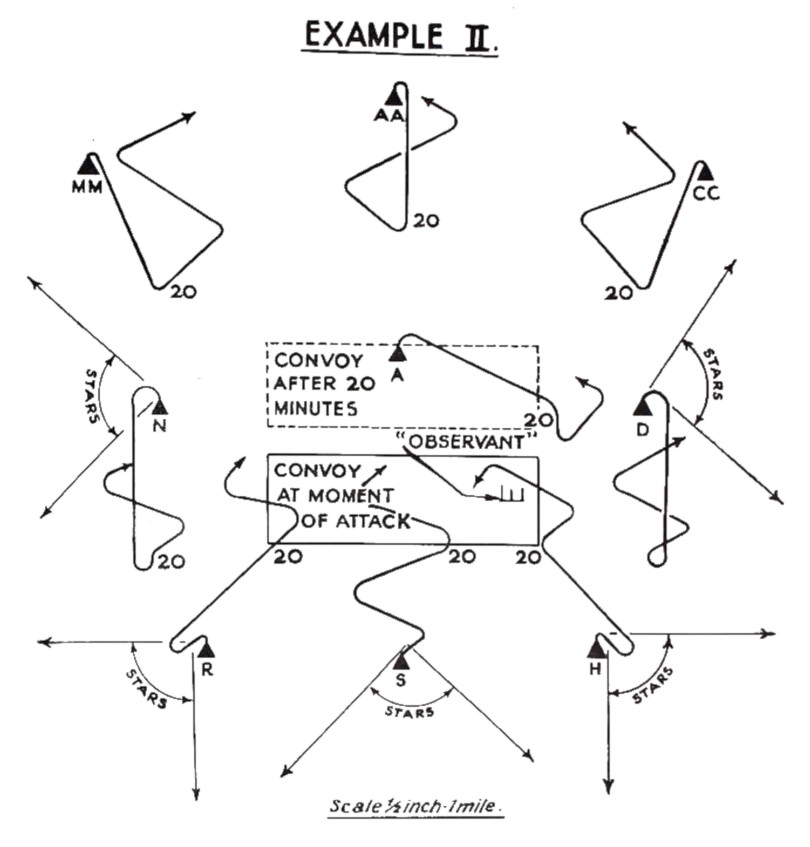
Banana variant for a nine-escort formation.

Banana was intended for when a single U-boat attacked the convoy (unlike Pineapple which was intended for pack attacks). Along with Pineapple, it supplanted Raspberry.

Upon seeing a merchant ship being torpedoed, the escort was to fire two white rockets or Roman candles and signal "banana" over the radio, then begin sweeping with sonar and radar at maximum viable speed. The rear escorts fire star shells outwards, then move into the convoy to sweep with sonar in a zigzag pattern. The first of these escorts to reach the wreck of the torpedoed vessel carries out Operation Observant in the area. The escorts to the flanks of the convoy sweep towards the rear of the convoy until they were abreast of the rear escorts, after which they turn around and sweep forward in a zigzag pattern. The forward escorts were to sweep forward in a zigzag pattern.

=== Beta Search ===
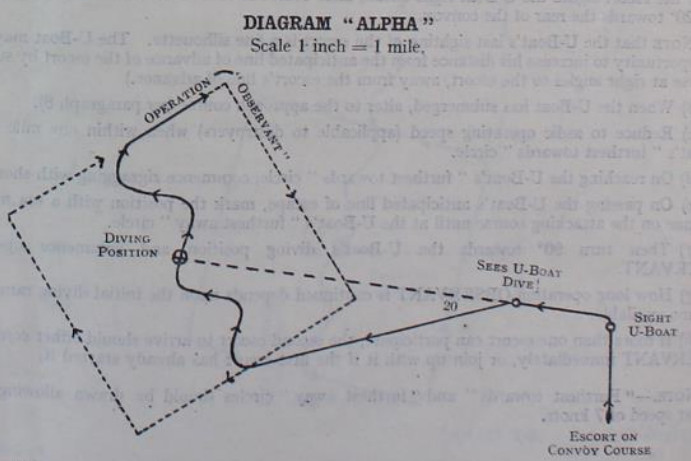
Alpha Search, developed by Frederic Walker

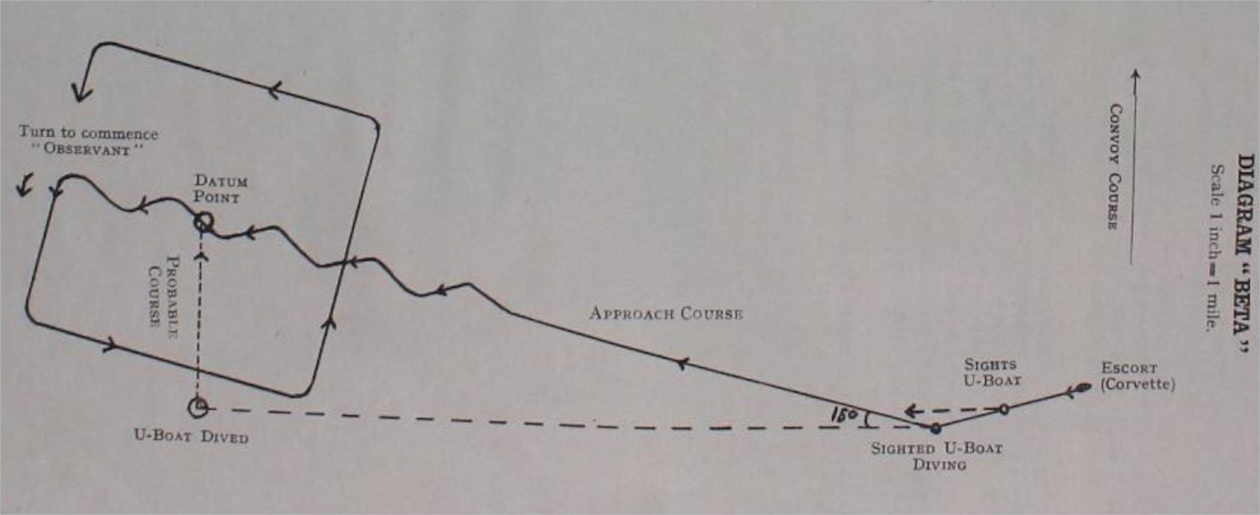
Beta Search, developed by Roberts' team at WATU

Beta Search was a manoeuvre by which an escort might be able to locate a U-Boat that it had spotted shadowing a convoy. The manual for escort commanders (Atlantic Convoy Instructions) noted that a single escort had a poor chance of finding and destroying a U-boat, but by assuming the most likely course the U-Boat would take and searching within that vicinity, the odds of success could be raised somewhat. Beta Search was a development of an earlier manoeuvre developed by Commander Frederic Walker called Alpha Search. The advantage of Beta Search over Alpha Search is that Beta Search persuades the U-boat to move in a specific direction. The disadvantage of Beta Search is that the escort must be fitted with "special plotting equipment" to use it.

In Alpha Search, the escort turns to head straight for the U-boat, which will prompt the U-boat to dive. The escort then turns 20 degrees. When the escort reaches the U-boat's "furthest towards" circle, it alters course towards the position the U-boat dived, moving in a zigzag with short legs (Note: Make turns at short intervals (3 to 7 minutes) as opposed to long-leg zigzags of 10 to 30 minutes.) pattern. Upon passing the location where the U-boat dived, the escort drops a marker in the water, then proceeds for the same distanced zigzagging. Then it turns 90 degrees towards the convoy and begins a search pattern known as Operation Observant.

In Beta Search, the escort turns towards the U-boat, but not directly towards it. The U-boat would likely react by submerging and following a course parallel to the convoy. The escort then moves towards the U-boat's predicted position along that course (this would be on a roughly 15 degree angle from the bearing on which the U-boat was spotted). When the escort reaches the U-boat's "furthest towards" circle, it starts "zigzagging with short legs". When the escort passes over the U-boat's predicted line of escape, it was to drop a sea marker in the water. When the escort reached the U-boat's "furthest away" circle, it was to turn 90 degrees towards the position where the U-boat dived and begin Operation Observant.

=== Step Aside ===

Step Aside was a manoeuvre by which a warship could attack a U-boat armed with acoustic torpedoes, specifically the T5 Zaunkönig torpedo, which the Royal Navy referred to as the GNAT (German Navy Acoustic Torpedo). This torpedo used built-in hydrophones to guide itself to its target by sound. The first use of this torpedo was on 20 September 1943 against convoy ON 202. The Royal Navy was already aware that the Germans had developed an acoustic torpedo through interrogations of captured Germans and decrypted communications. In the attack on ON 202, a frigate was hit in the rear while it was bearing down on the U-boat, something which could only have been done by a guided torpedo drawn to the sound of the frigate's propeller.

The speed of the T5 torpedo was 24 knots (44 km/h); ships such as destroyers faster than that could just outrun the torpedo, which had a range of 5,000 yards. (The fastest torpedo in the German arsenal was the 40-knot non-acoustic G7a.) For slower ships that were not equipped with Foxer decoys—most convoy escorts were frigates and corvettes, with a maximum speed of 16 to 20 knots—Roberts and his team at WATU developed a manoeuvre known as Step Aside.

Under Step Aside the warship made sharp turns to dodge the acoustic torpedoes the U-boat might fire as the warship manoeuvred into attack range. Step Aside was communicated by radio to escort commanders at sea on 23 September 1943.

Upon sighting a U-boat within 6,000 yards, the ship heads straight for the U-boat at best speed. It was expected that the U-boat would fire an acoustic torpedo when it saw the ship heading straight for it. After 2 minutes, the ship turns 60 degrees to either side and holds this divergent course for 3 minutes, thereby putting itself outside the acoustic torpedo's detection range (thought to be 300 yards). Then the ship turns to head straight for the U-boat again. If the U-boat has not yet dived, the ship repeats the manoeuvre: sail towards the U-boat for 2 minutes, then turn 60 degrees, etc. The warship repeats this process until the U-boat dives. When the U-boat dives, the ship rushes to the U-boat's diving position, then slows down to do a sonar search.

== Legacy ==
After WATU was closed, Admiral Horton sent the following signal to its former members: "On the closing down of WATU I wish to express my gratitude and high appreciation of the magnificent work of Captain Roberts and his staff, which contributed in no small measure to the final defeat of Germany." Admiral Noble sent Roberts a letter in which he wrote: "...you had a great deal to do in winning the war because if we hadn't won the Battle of the Atlantic we should undoubtedly have lost the war!"

What makes WATU a noteworthy episode in the history of military wargaming is that it was an early instance where wargames were used to develop solutions to problems that were occurring in an ongoing war. Up to that point, most wargames were played during peacetime to prepare officers for potential wars, and the scenarios they explored either were hypothetical or happened many years ago. This was made possible by communications technologies that were not available to wargamers in earlier eras (radio and telephone).

== Media representations ==
The training course provided by WATU appears in the 1951 novel The Cruel Sea, referred to as the "Commanding Officers' Tactical Course". The author, Nicholas Monsarrat, had attended WATU during his service in the war. The scene did not appear in the 1953 movie adaptation.

The role of WATU in the Battle of the North Atlantic is highlighted in the 2022 television series U-Boat Wargamers, and which also emphasises how the unit's Royal Navy Wrens significantly contributed to WATU's success.

== See also ==
- Rodger Winn

== Bibliography ==
- Max Hastings (2011). Inferno: The World at War, 1939-1945. Knopf Doubleday Publishing Group. ISBN 9780307957184.
- Simon Parkin (2019). A Game of Birds and Wolves: The Secret Game that Won the War. Hodder & Staughton. ISBN 9781529353051.
- Richard Overy (1995). Why the Allies Won. W. W. Norton & Company. ISBN 0-393-03925-0.
- Mark Williams (1979). Captain Gilbert Roberts R. N. and the Anti-U-Boat School. Cassell. ISBN 0-304-30386-0.
- Geoffrey Sloan (2019). "The Royal Navy and Organizational Learning — The Western Approaches Tactical Unit and the Battle of the Atlantic". Naval War College Review. 72 (4).
- Richard Doherty (2015). Churchill's Greatest Fear: The Battle of the Atlantic 3 September 1939 to 7 May 1945. Pen and Sword. ISBN 9781473879416.
- David K. Brown (2012) [2000]. Nelson to Vanguard: Warship Design and Development, 1923–1945. Pen and Sword. ISBN 9781473816695.
- Paul Akermann (2002). Encyclopedia of British Submarines 1901-1955. Periscope Publishing Ltd. ISBN 9781904381051.
- Malcolm Llewellyn-Jones (2006). The Royal Navy and Anti-submarine Warfare, 1917-49. Taylor & Francis. ISBN 9780415385329.
- Atlantic Convoy Instructions.
- Captain G. H. Roberts C.B.E., R.N. (1947) The Battles of the Atlantic, Royal United Services Institution. Journal, 92:566, 202-215, DOI: 10.1080/03071844709433989
- A. J. McWhinnie (26 February 1944). "Behind the Atlantic Battle" (PDF). Illustrated. Odhams Press.
- Norman Polmar; Thomas B. Allen (2012). World War II: the Encyclopedia of the War Years, 1941-1945. Courier Corporation. ISBN 9780486479620.
