= Professional wargaming =

Used by the military for training or research

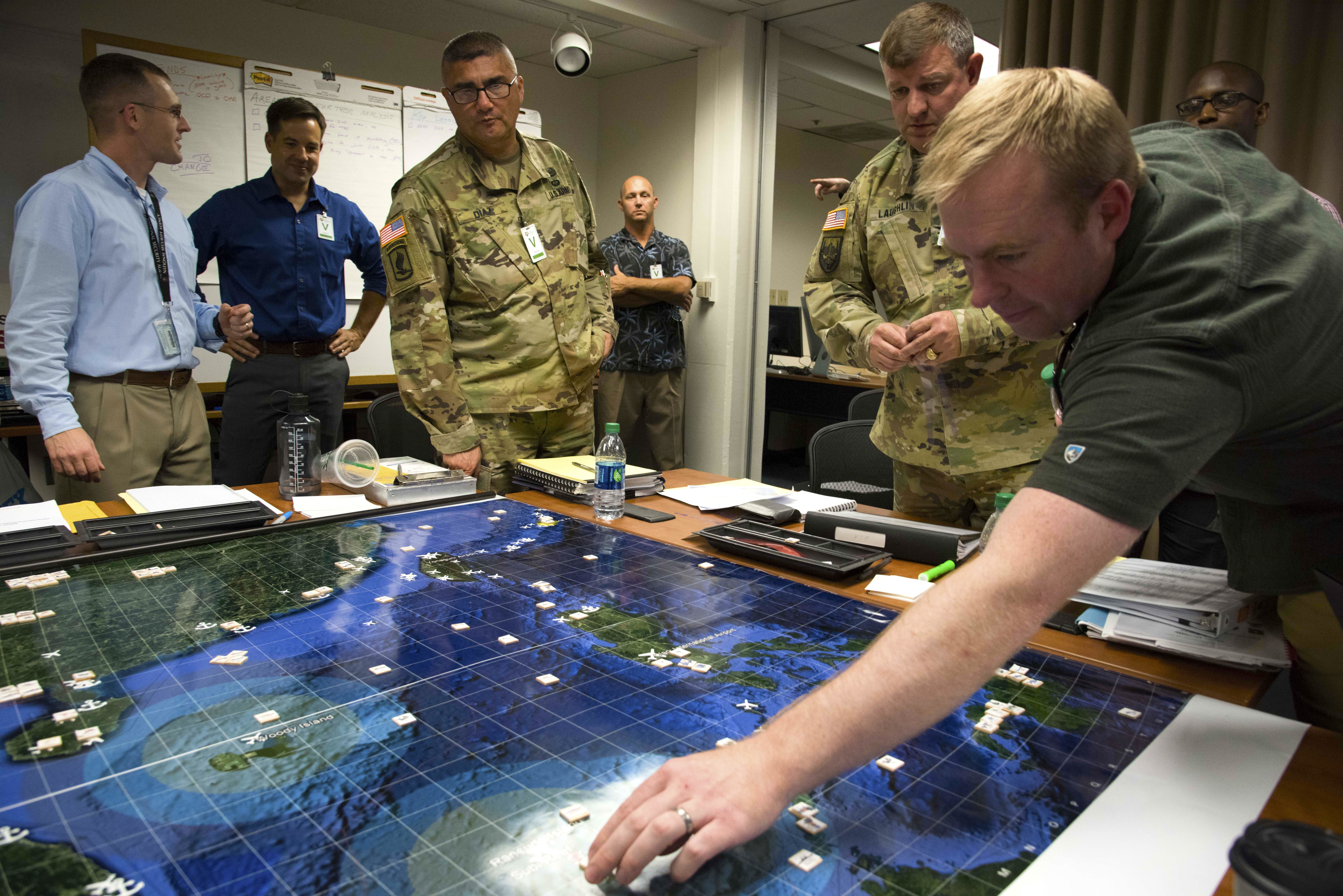
A wargame at the US Naval Postgraduate School (June 2018).

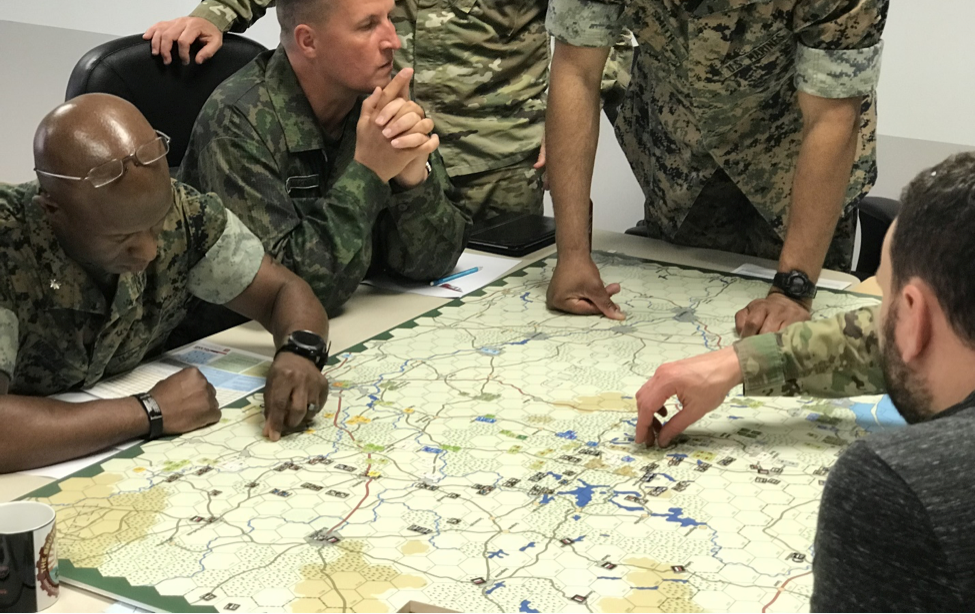
A wargame at the US Marine Corps War College (April 2019).

A wargame, generally, is a type of strategy game which realistically simulates warfare. A professional wargame, specifically, is a wargame that is used by military organizations to train officers in tactical and strategic decision-making, to test new tactics and strategies, or to predict trends in future conflicts. This is in contrast to recreational wargames, which are designed for fun and competition.

== Overview ==
=== Definition ===
The exact definition of "wargame" varies from one writer to the next and one organization to the next. To prevent confusion, this section will establish the general definition employed by this article.

- A wargame simulates an armed conflict, be it a battle, a campaign, or an entire war. "Business wargames" do not simulate armed conflict and are therefore outside the scope of this article.
- A wargame is adversarial. There must be at least two opposing sides whose players react intelligently to each other's decisions.
- A wargame must have human players.
- A wargame does not involve the use of actual troops and armaments. This definition is used by the US Naval War College. Some writers use the term "live wargames" to refer to games that use actual troops in the field, but this article shall instead refer to these as field exercises.
- A wargame is about tactical or strategic decision-making. A game that exercises only the player's technical skills, such as a combat flight simulator, is not a wargame.

Still, some professional wargamers feel that the term "game" trivializes what they see as a serious, professional tool. One of these was Georg von Reisswitz, the creator of Kriegsspiel and the father of professional wargaming, but he stuck with the word "game" because he could not think of a better term. In the US Army, many preferred the term "map maneuvers" (in contrast to "field maneuvers"). At the US Naval War College, some preferred the terms "chart maneuvers" (when simulating campaigns) and "board maneuvers" (when simulating battles), although the term "war game" was never officially proscribed.

=== Professional wargames vs commercial wargames ===
Professional wargames tend to have looser rules and simpler models than recreational wargames, with an umpire arbitrating situations based on personal knowledge. If the umpire is highly knowledgeable about warfare (perhaps they are a veteran), then such wargames can achieve a higher degree of realism than wargames with rigid rulesets. In a recreational wargame, such looseness would lead to concerns over fairness, but the point of a professional wargame is education, not competition. Having simple, loose rules also keeps the learning curve small, which is convenient since most officers have little or no wargaming experience.

Likewise, there is less concern regarding "balance" when determining each player's armaments and strategic advantages. In a commercial wargame, the rules are usually designed to ensure that the players' armies are of equal strength to ensure fairness, but professional wargames will tailor each side's capabilities to the scenario to be investigated, and warfare in the real world is rarely fair.

As professional wargames are used to prepare officers for actual warfare, there is naturally a strong emphasis on realism and current events. Historical wargames are wargames set in the distant past, such as World War II or the Napoleonic Wars—simulating these wars realistically may be of interest to historians, but are of little use to the military. Recreational wargames may take some creative liberties with reality, such as simplifying models to make them more enjoyable, or adding fictional armaments and units such as orcs and wizards, making them of little use to officers who must fight in the real world.

Military organizations are typically secretive about their current wargames, and this makes designing a professional wargame a challenge. Secrecy makes it harder to disseminate corrections if the wargame has already been delivered to the clients. Whereas a commercial wargame might have thousands or even millions of players, professional wargames tend to have small player bases, which makes it harder for the designers to acquire feedback. As a consequence, errors in wargame models tend to persist.

Although commercial wargame designers take consumer trends and player feedback into account, their products are usually designed and sold with a take-it-or-leave-it approach. Professional wargames, by contrast, are typically commissioned by the military that plans to use them. If a wargame is commissioned by several clients, then the designer will have to juggle their competing demands. This can lead to great complexity, high development costs, and a compromised product that satisfies nobody.

Commercial wargames are under more pressure to deliver an enjoyable experience for the players, who expect a user-friendly interface, a reasonable learning curve, exciting gameplay, and so forth. By contrast, military organizations tend to see wargaming as a tool and a chore, and players are often bluntly obliged to use whatever is provided to them.

== Design concepts ==
=== Models ===
The term "model" can mean two things in wargaming. One is the conceptual models that describe the properties, capabilities, and behaviors of the things the wargame attempts to simulate (weapons, vehicles, troops, terrain, weather, etc.). The other meaning, from miniature wargaming (a form of recreational wargaming), is physical models, i.e. sculptures of soldiers, vehicles, and terrain; which generally serve an aesthetic purpose and have little if any consequence on the simulation. Professional wargames rarely use physical models because aesthetics aren't important to the military and the scale at which professional wargames typically play make physical models impractical. Therefore, this article will focus on conceptual models.

A wargame is about decision-making, not about learning the technical capabilities of a particular weapon or vehicle. Therefore, a well-designed model will not describe something beyond what a player needs to know to make effective decisions. Players should not be burdened with cumbersome calculations, because this slows down the game and distracts the players. If a player makes a bad decision, it should only be because of poor strategic thinking, not some forgotten rule or arithmetic error, otherwise the game will yield less reliable insights. If the wargame is computer-assisted, then sophisticated models are feasible because they can be written into the software and processed quickly by the computer. For manual wargames, simplicity is paramount.

=== Level of war ===
In a tactical-level wargame, the scope of the simulated conflict is a single battle. Kriegsspiel, the original professional wargame, is an example of a tactical-level wargame. The wargames of the Western Approaches Tactical Unit (see below) were also tactical-level, simulating submarine attacks on a merchant convoy.

In a strategic-level wargame, the scope of the simulated conflict is a campaign or even an entire war. An example is the "Chart Maneuvers" practiced by the US Naval War College during the 1920s and 1930s, which most often simulated a hypothetical war in the Pacific against Japan. Another example is the Sigma wargames played in the 1960s to test proposed strategies for fighting the Vietnam War. Battles are resolved through simple computation. The players concern themselves with higher-level, strategic concerns such as logistics and diplomacy.

== Utility ==
=== General strengths and limitations ===
In comparison to field exercises, wargames save time and money. They can be organized quickly and cheaply as they do not require the mobilization of thousands of men, their armaments, and logistics systems.

Some wargames can be completed more quickly than the conflicts they simulate by compressing time. In a naval wargame, the players need not wait days for their fleets to sail across the ocean, they could just advance the time-frame to the next decision they must make. This is particularly advantageous for strategic-level games, in which the simulated conflict might last months. A tactical-level wargame that has very cumbersome computations might take longer to play out than the battle it represents (this problem afflicted the original Kriegsspiel).

Wargamers can experiment with assets that their military does not actually possess, such as alliances that their country does not have, armaments that they have yet to acquire, and even hypothetical technologies that have yet to be invented.

For example: After World War I, Germany was forced to downsize its armed forces and outright give up certain weapons such as planes, tanks, and submarines. This made it difficult, if not impossible, for German officers to develop their doctrines through field exercises. The Germans greatly expanded their use of wargaming to compensate. When Germany began openly rearming in 1934, its officers already had fairly well-developed theories on what armaments to buy and what organizational reforms to implement.

Wargames cannot be used to predict the progression and outcome of a war as one might predict the weather. Human behavior is too difficult to predict for that. Wargames cannot provoke the anxiety, anger, stress, fatigue, etc. that a commander will experience in actual combat and thus cannot foresee the effects of these emotions on his decision-making. That said, no training tool can replicate the emotional experience of war, so this is not a specific flaw. Another issue that can produce "wrong" predictions is that a commander may do things differently in the field precisely because he was dissatisfied with the decisions he made in the wargames.

=== Education ===
Wargames are a safe and cost-effective way by which officers can practice their decision-making skills. Some writers have compared it to sparring in the martial arts. This is the oldest application of wargaming. The actual effectiveness of wargaming in this regard—turning a bad strategist into a good one—is difficult to measure because officers use many tools to hone their decision-making skills and the effect of wargaming is difficult to isolate.

In this context, wargames are used to help players understand the decision-making process of wartime command. Wargames can help players master through practice certain routine skills such as how to discuss ideas, share intel, and communicate orders. Wargames can present the players with intellectual challenges that they cannot receive from books or in the classroom: an enemy who reacts unpredictably and intelligently to the player's decisions,

Wargames train players to evaluate situations and make decisions faster. They teach players how to discuss ideas, and the protocols for sharing intel and communicating orders. They teach the players how to cope with incomplete, delayed, incorrect, or superfluous information. They teach the player how to cope with an unpredictable foe who reacts intelligently to their decisions.

Wargames can also help familiarize the players with the geography of areas where they might eventually have to fight in. This was an oft-cited justification for wargaming at the US Naval War College.

=== Research and planning ===
Wargames can be used to prepare grand strategic plans and develop doctrine with a low risk of the enemy becoming aware of these developments and adapting. A problem that any military faces when learning through hard experience (actual warfare) is that as it gets better at fighting the enemy, the enemy will adapt in turn, modifying their own armaments and tactics to maintain their edge. Live exercises have a similar weakness as the enemy can spy on them to learn what is being tested. But wargames can be done in good secrecy, so the enemy cannot know what ideas are being developed.

Wargames can help a military determine what armaments and infrastructure it should acquire (there is substantial historical evidence to support this particular assertion).

For instance: In the 1920s, American military planners believed that America could win a war with Japan quickly by simply sailing an armada across the Pacific and knocking out the Japanese navy in a few decisive battles. But when this strategy was tested in wargames, it routinely failed. Japan held off the assault until the American armada exhausted itself, and then counter-attacked. The wargames foretold that a war with Japan would instead be a prolonged war of attrition, and America would need advance bases in the western Pacific where its warships could get resupplied and repaired. Such an infrastructure would require making alliances with friendly countries such as Australia, New Zealand, and the British Empire.

Wargames can also be used to develop the potential of new technology. In order to wield a new technology optimally, it is not enough for a military to merely have it, but also develop good tactics and know how to organize around it. If the enemy isn't exploring the same issues in their own wargames, then one can gain a significant edge over the enemy when war breaks out by deploying a more mature doctrine.

An example is German submarine doctrine in the World Wars. In World War I, submarines were a new thing and nobody knew how best to use them, and Germany developed its submarine doctrine on the go. The German navy at the time did not use wargames and tested new ideas immediately against the British. Consequently, for every incremental innovation in submarine warfare that the Germans deployed, the British quickly developed a counter-measure and kept pace, and this limited the impact of submarines in World War I. During the inter-war years, the German navy experimented extensively with new submarine tactics in wargames (in tandem with field exercises) and developed the "wolf-pack" doctrine to defeat the anti-submarine counter-measures that had been developed during World War I (notably the convoy system). The British, by contrast, did not experiment with submarines in their own wargames because they thought that their established counter-measures were sufficient. The Germans entered the war with a whole bag of new tricks, and it took some time for the British to catch up.

== History ==
=== The Reisswitzian wargame ===
Around the turn of the 19th century, a number of European inventors created wargames based on chess. These games used pieces that represented real army units (infantry, artillery, etc.) and the squares on the board were color-coded to represent different terrain types (rivers, marshes, mountains, etc.). Basing these games on chess made them attractive and accessible to chess players, but also made them too unrealistic to be taken seriously by the army. The grid forced the terrain into unnatural forms, such as rivers flowing in straight lines and bending at right angles; and only a single piece could occupy a square at a time, even if that square represented a square mile.

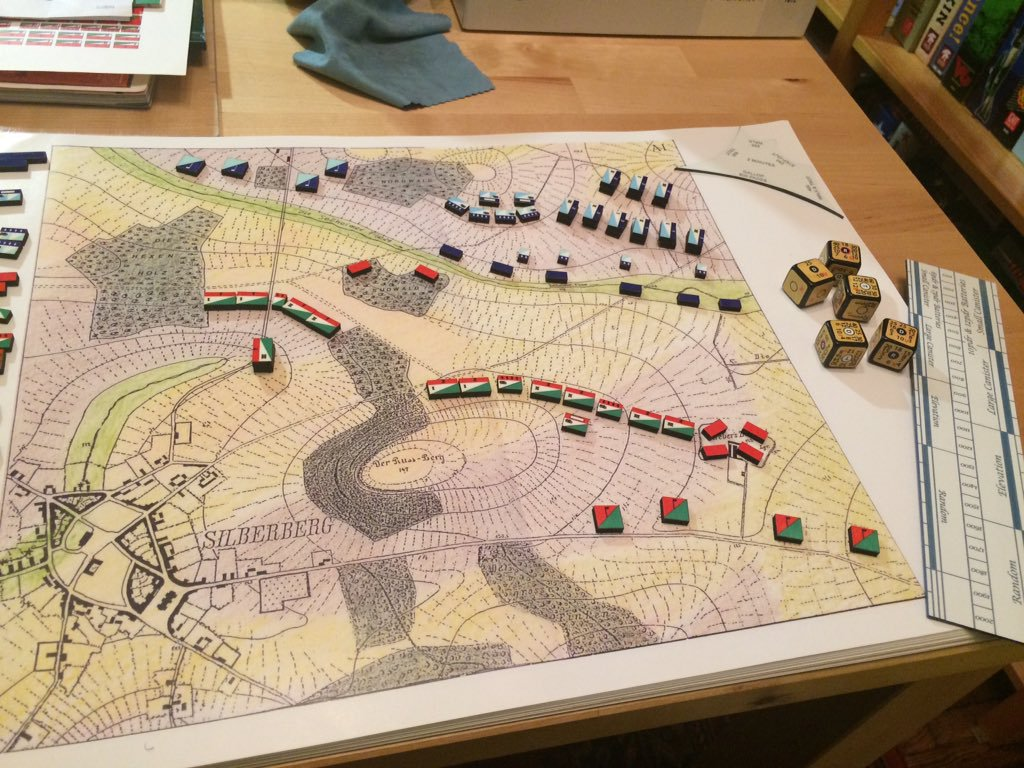
A reconstruction of the wargame developed in 1824 by Reisswitz

In 1824, a Prussian army officer named Georg von Reisswitz presented to the Prussian General Staff a wargame that he and his father had developed over the years. It was a highly realistic wargame designed strictly for use as a professional tool of training, and not for leisure. Instead of a chess-like grid, this game was played on accurate paper maps of the kind the Prussian army used. This allowed the game to model terrain naturally and simulate battles in real locations. The pieces could be moved across the map in a free-form manner, subject to terrain obstacles. The pieces, each of which represented some kind of army unit (an infantry battalion, a cavalry squadron, etc.), were little rectangular blocks made of lead. The pieces were painted either red or blue to indicate the faction it belonged to. The blue pieces were used to represent the Prussian army and red was used to represent some foreign enemy—since then it has been the convention in professional wargaming to use blue to represent the faction to which the players actually belong to. The game used dice to add a degree of randomness to combat. The scale of the map was 1:8000 and the pieces were made to the same proportions as the units they represented, such that each piece occupied the same relative space on the map as the corresponding unit did on the battlefield.

The game modeled the capabilities of the units realistically using data gathered by the Prussian army during the Napoleonic Wars and various field exercises. Reisswitz's manual provided tables that listed how far each unit type could move in a round according to the terrain it was crossing and whether it was marching, running, galloping, etc.; and accordingly the umpire used a ruler to move the pieces across the map. The game used dice to determine combat results and inflicted casualties, and the casualties inflicted by firearms and artillery decreased over distance. Unlike chess pieces, units in Reisswitz's game could suffer partial losses before being defeated, which were tracked on a sheet of paper (recreational gamers might call this "hitpoint tracking"). The game also had some rules that modeled morale and exhaustion.

Reisswitz's game also used an umpire. The players did not directly control the pieces on the game map. Rather, they wrote orders for their virtual troops on pieces of paper, which they submitted to the umpire. The umpire then moved the pieces across the game map according to how he judged the virtual troops would interpret and carry out their orders. When the troops engaged the enemy on the map, it was the umpire who rolled the dice, computed the effects, and removed defeated units from the map. The umpire also managed secret information so as to simulate the fog of war. The umpire placed pieces on the map only for those units which he judged both sides could see. He kept a mental track of where the hidden units were, and only placed their pieces on the map when he judged they came into view of the enemy.

Earlier wargames had fixed victory conditions, such as occupying the enemy's fortress. By contrast, Reisswitz's wargame was open-ended. The umpire decided what the victory conditions were, if there were to be any, and they typically resembled the goals an actual army in battle might aim for. The emphasis was on the experience of decision-making and strategic thinking, not on competition. As Reisswitz himself wrote: "The winning or losing, in the sense of a card or board game, does not come into it."

In the English-speaking world, Reisswitz's wargame and its variants are called Kriegsspiel, which is the German word for "wargame".

=== German professional wargaming (1824–1914) ===
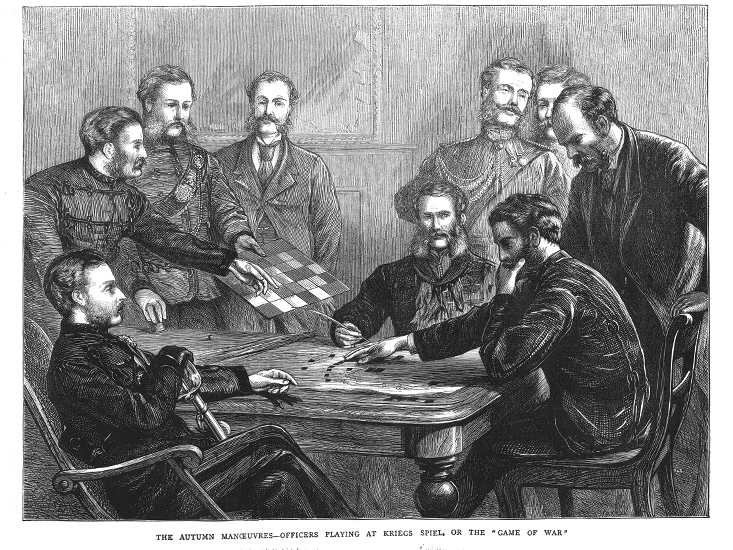
Prussian officers playing Kriegsspiel (illustr. August 1872).

Reisswitz showed his wargame to the Prussian king and his General Staff in 1824. They were greatly impressed. General Karl von Mueffling wrote: "It’s not a game at all! It's training for war. I shall recommend it enthusiastically to the whole army." The king decreed that every regiment should play Kriegsspiel, and by the end of the decade every regiment had purchased materials for it. By the 1850s it had become very popular in the army. Kriegsspiel was therefore the first wargame to be treated as a serious tool of training and research by a military organization.

Aside from official military venues, Kriegsspiel was also played in a number of private clubs around the country, which were mainly patronized by officers but also had civilian members, so Kriegsspiel was certainly being played in a recreational context. The first such club was the Berlin Wargame Association. (Note: German: Berliner Kriegsspiel-Verein) In 1828, General von Moltke the Elder joined the Magdeburg Club and became its manager.

Over the years, other officers updated Reisswitz's game to reflect changes in technology and doctrine. A particularly noteworthy variant was free Kriegsspiel, developed in 1876 by General Julius von Verdy du Vernois. Vernois was frustrated by the cumbersome rules of traditional rigid Kriegsspiel. They took a lot of time to learn and prevented experienced officers from applying their own expertise. The computations also slowed down the game; sometimes, a session would take longer to play than the actual battle it represented. Vernois advocated dispensing with the rules altogether and allowing the umpire to determine the outcomes of player decisions as he saw fit. Dice, rulers, computations, etc. were optional. This rules-free variant, of course, depended more heavily on the competence and impartiality of the umpire. The relative merits and drawbacks of rules-heavy and freeform wargaming are still debated to this day.

=== Wargaming spreads around the world ===
Prussian wargaming attracted little attention outside Prussia before 1870. Prussia was considered a second-rate power and wargaming an unproven novelty. That changed in 1870, when Prussia defeated France in the Franco-Prussian War. Many credited Prussia's victory to its wargaming tradition. The Prussian army did not have any significant advantage in weaponry, numbers, or troop quality, but it was the only army in the world that practiced wargaming. Civilians and military forces around the world now took a keen interest in German wargames, which foreigners referred to as Kriegsspiel (the German word for "wargame"). The first Kriegsspiel manual in English, based on the system of Wilhelm von Tschischwitz, was published in 1872 for the British army and received a royal endorsement. The world's first recreational wargaming club was the University Kriegspiel [sic] Club, founded in 1873 at Oxford University in England. In the United States, Charles Adiel Lewis Totten published Strategos, the American War Game in 1880, and William R. Livermore published The American Kriegsspiel in 1882, both heavily inspired by Prussian wargames. In 1894, the US Naval War College made wargaming a regular tool of instruction.

=== Wargaming at the US Naval War College (1919–1941) ===
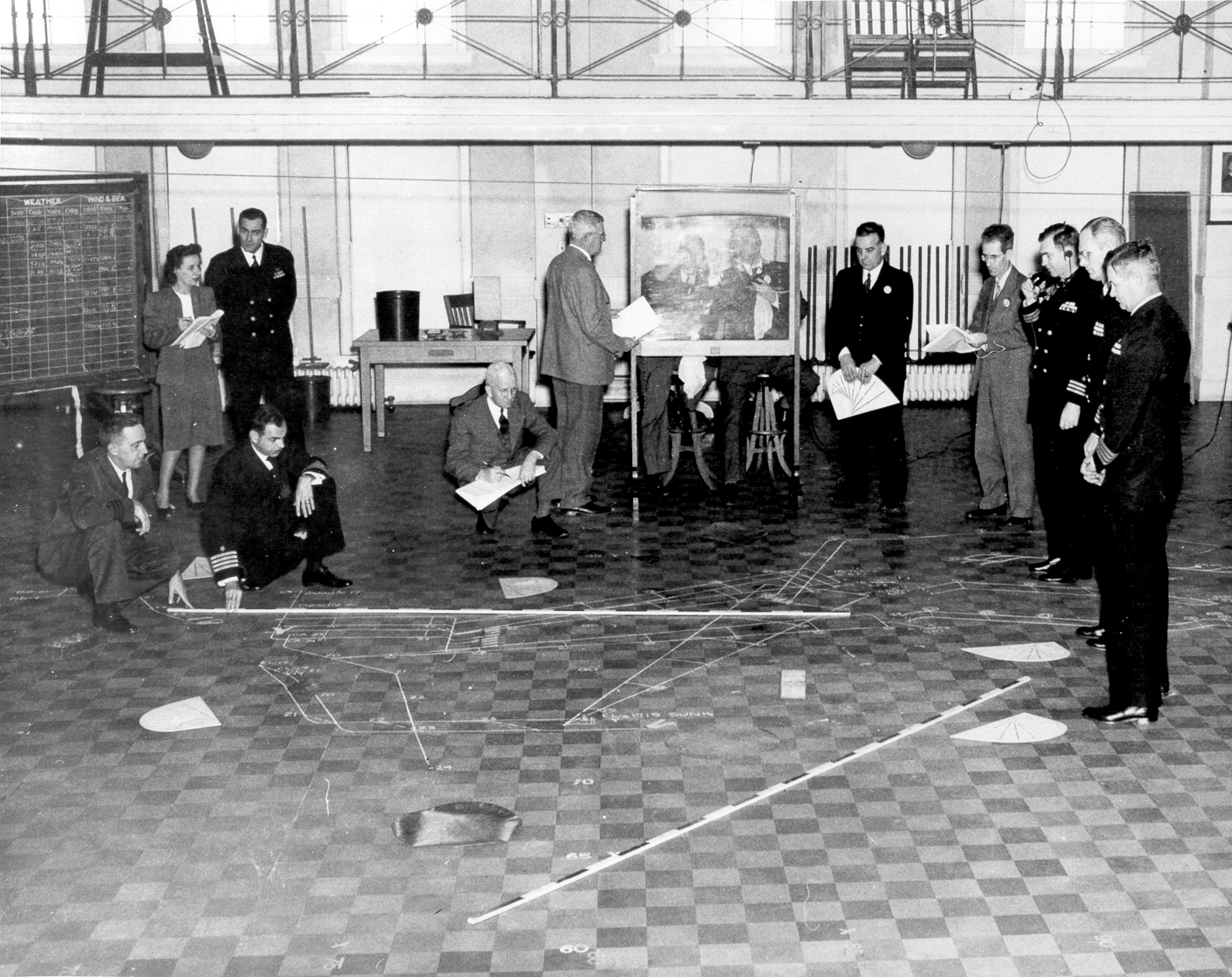
A wargame at the US Naval War College. This photo was taken in the 1950s, but strongly resembles the wargames played in the 1930s.

The US Naval War College is a staff college where American officers of all ranks go to receive postgraduate training. Since 1894, wargaming has been a regular tool of instruction there. Wargaming was brought to the Naval War College by William McCarty Little, a retired Navy lieutenant who had likely been inspired after reading The American Kriegsspiel by W.R. Livermore. Livermore was stationed nearby at Fort Adams, and he and Little cooperated to translate the ideas behind Kriegsspiel to naval warfare.

After World War I, the Navy suffered severe budget cuts that prevented it from upgrading and expanding its fleet. This limited its ability to conduct naval exercises. Wargaming thus became a vital means of testing hypothetical strategies and tactics. Another problem was that by the time America entered World War II in 1941, none of the Navy's senior officers had any meaningful combat experience because the Navy had not been involved in any war for over 20 years. However, almost all of them had participated in wargames at the Naval War College, so they had plenty of virtual combat experience. The fact that America defeated Japan in World War II despite these shortcomings, is evidence for the value of the wargaming. After the war, Admiral Nimitz said that the wargames predicted every tactic the Japanese used except for the kamikazes (a somewhat hyperbolic assertion).

The Naval War College organized two broad classes of wargames: "chart maneuvers", which were strategic-level games; and "board maneuvers", which were tactical-level games. The chart maneuvers were about fleet movements, scouting and screening operations, and supply lines. The board maneuvers simulated battles in detail, with the aid of model ships. Most of the wargames were played on the floors of lecture halls, as they needed more space than any table could provide.

The two most frequently played scenarios were a war with Japan and a war with Britain. Japan was code-named ORANGE, Britain was code-named RED, and America was code-named BLUE. Neither the students nor the staff at the Naval War College expected a war with Britain. It's possible that the US Navy didn't imagine getting into any sort of serious naval conflict in the Atlantic with anyone, and that it simulated wars against Britain simply because it saw the Royal Navy as its role model. A war with Japan, on the other hand, was a real concern, and as the years passed the wargames were increasingly played against ORANGE.

In case of a war with Japan, the US Navy's grand strategy was to send an armada straight across the Pacific and quickly defeat the Japanese navy in one or two decisive battles. The wargamers at the College tested this strategy extensively, and it routinely failed. In 1933, the Navy's Research Department reviewed the wargames played from 1927 to 1933 and concluded that the fundamental problem was that the armada over-extended its supply lines. The BLUE armada would exhaust itself, and ORANGE would recover and counter-attack. After this, the wargamers at the College abandoned the old doctrine and instead developed a more progressive strategy, which involved building a logistics infrastructure in the western Pacific and making alliances with regional countries. By the mid-1930s, the wargames resembled very much what the Navy later experienced in the Pacific War.

The wargames also produced tactical innovations, most notably the "circular formation". In this formation, as it was used in World War II, an aircraft carrier was surrounded by concentric circles of cruisers and destroyers. This formation concentrated anti-aircraft fire, and also was easier to maneuver than a line of battle because all the ships could turn at once with a signal from the central ship. The circular formation was first proposed in September 1922 by Commander Roscoe C. MacFall. Initially, the wargamers at the College used a battleship as the central ship, but this was eventually supplanted by the aircraft carrier. Chester Nimitz, who was a fellow student that same year, was impressed by what the circular formation could do, and Nimitz played a pivotal role in making it Navy doctrine.

On the other hand, the wargamers at the Naval War College failed to develop good submarine doctrine. They didn't have a good understanding of what submarines could do. Unlike the German navy, the US Navy had no significant experience with submarine warfare. Most of the time, the players used submarines as a screening force that sailed ahead of the main formation. Players rarely used submarines in independent operations, and never to attack commercial shipping as German wargamers were doing at the time.

For a few years after the end of World War II, wargaming almost ceased in America. At the Naval War College, wargaming dropped to about 10% of its pre-war level.

=== German wargaming after World War I ===
The Treaty of Versailles greatly restricted the size of Germany's armed forces and outright banned certain weapons such as planes, tanks, and submarines. This made it difficult if not impossible for the German military to develop their doctrines through field exercises. The Germans greatly expanded their use of wargaming to compensate, and between 1919 and 1939, the German military used wargaming more heavily than any other in the world. By the time Germany began openly rearming in 1934, its officers already had fairly well-developed theories on what armaments to buy and what organizational reforms to implement.

German wargaming at this time was restricted to tactical and operational-level play. Hitler discouraged strategic-level games, as he was confident enough in his own ability to make strategic judgments. Over the course of the war, Germany fought well at the tactical and operational level but made many bad strategic decisions.

During World War 1, the British learned to protect their ships from German submarines by moving them in convoys which were escorted by submarine-hunting ships. The convoy system proved effective against German submarines, which typically operated alone. During the inter-war years, the German navy developed the "wolf-pack" doctrine by which German submarines would attack convoys in groups to confuse and overwhelm the escorts. These ideas were tested in a combination of wargames and naval exercises. Karl Doenitz, who would later command German submarine operations during World War II, organized a series of wargames held during the winter of 1938-39, and from the results he concluded that it would be best for a wolf-pack attack to be coordinated by a designated command submarine rather than a commander onshore. He also concluded that Germany needed 300 submarines to effectively destroy British shipping, and that Germany's existing submarine fleet would at most inflict "pin-pricks".

After World War II, wargaming ceased in Germany, as well as in the other Axis powers. Germany didn't even have an army until 1955, so they saw little need to wargame. When West Germany established its new army in 1955, they had so few officers with wargaming experience that the German War College asked the US Air Force to provide it an officer with wargaming experience.

=== British naval wargaming during World War II ===
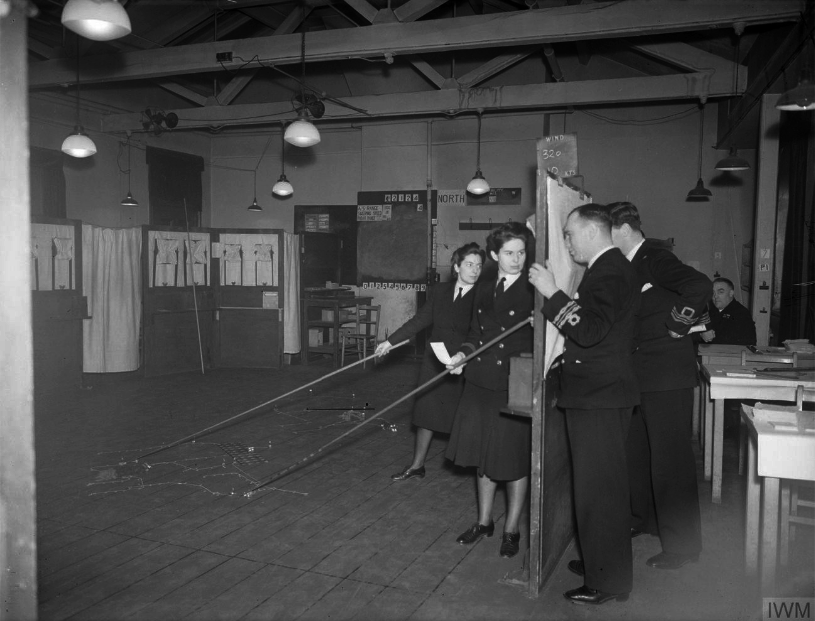
A naval wargame at WATU (1942). The male players on the right are looking through peepholes in a screen which hides the enemy board.

In January 1942, the British Royal Navy established a naval tactical analysis unit called the Western Approaches Tactical Unit (WATU), which was tasked with developing ways to counter the German submarine "wolf-packs" that were devastating shipping convoys in the Atlantic. It was based in Liverpool, directed by Captain Gilbert Roberts, and staffed mainly by young women from the Women's Royal Naval Service. Their primary analytical tool was wargaming.

The staff at WATU used wargames to test various hypothetical submarine tactics against virtual convoys, and if a certain tactic proved consistently effective and produced outcomes similar to what the actual convoys were reporting, WATU assumed that is what the Germans were in fact doing. The staff at WATU would then design counter-measures and test them in wargames. WATU operated week-long courses wherein naval captains would be instructed in anti-submarine tactics through wargames.

It's uncertain exactly how many German submarines were sunk thanks to WATU's tactics, but at the close of the war, several British admirals asserted that WATU had played a decisive role in Germany's defeat. Had the German submarine threat to merchant shipping not been thwarted, Britain would have been forced to capitulate to the Germans for lack of food and other necessary imports.

What makes WATU a remarkable episode in the history of wargaming is that it was the first time in which wargames were used to analyze scenarios that were occurring in an ongoing war and develop solutions that were deployed immediately in the field. This was made possible by communications technologies such as telephone and radio.

=== Soviet Union ===
The Soviets inherited their wargaming techniques from tsarist officers, who favored the rigid form of wargaming pioneered by Reisswitz. Interestingly, the Soviets typically played wargames not on flat maps, but on three-dimensional model battlefields. Soviet wargames typically comprised only a single turn. The players would describe their plan to the umpires, who would then adjudicate the battle all the way to conclusion. This meant the players could not react to what the enemy was doing. This approach was optimal for decision-support but poor for developing the players' thinking skills.

Immediately after the end of World War II, there was a precipitous drop in wargaming in armed forces all over the world. The exception was the Soviet Union. The Soviets actually expanded their wargaming and made them more rigorous. The Soviets launched a massive effort to compile data from the war on the Eastern Front to make their wargames more valid.

During the Cold War, the Soviets allowed officers from other communist countries to attend its military schools, and wargaming was part of the curriculum. Using techniques learned in the Soviet Union, North Vietnamese officers wargamed their attacks against South Vietnam and her allies, and were able to coordinates complicated attacks without the need for radio communications by memorizing timetables.

=== The Navy Electronic Warfare Simulator (1958) ===
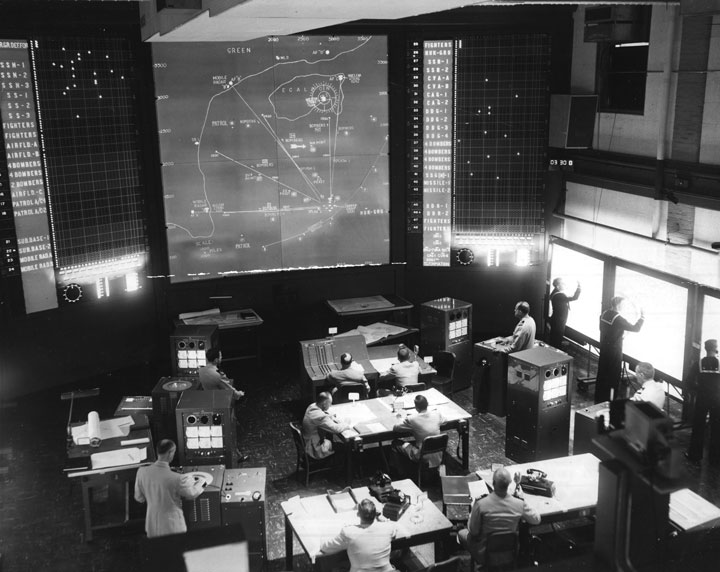
The Navy Electronic Warfare Simulator (1958).

The first computerized wargaming system was the Navy Electronic Warfare Simulator, which became operational in 1958 at the US Naval War College. The computer system, being from the pre-microchip era, spanned three floors. The game rooms were designed to the resemble the command centers where the Navy coordinated its fleets. When the system was first made operational in 1958, the Navy discovered that it could not model recent advances in military technology. For instance, it could not model ships moving faster than 500 knots. The system had taken 13 years to develop and, like most computers from that era, was difficult to reprogram or upgrade (it predated punch-cards). A variety of improvisational gimmicks were required to run wargames for the contemporary era.

=== SIGMA war games (United States, 1962–1967) ===
Between 1962 and 1967, the US military (Note: Specifically, the Joint War Games Agency, an agency of the Joint Chiefs of Staff.) conducted a series of strategic-level wargames known as the Sigma war games to test proposed strategies for fighting the Vietnam War.

The Sigma I-64 and II-64 games, conducted in 1964, were designed to test the proposed strategy of gradually escalating pressure on North Vietnam until it gave up out of economic self-interest. Graduated escalation was supposed to avoid accidentally provoking an intervention by China or the Soviet Union. It would also avoid making President Johnson look like a warmonger. This "graduated pressure" would primarily involve bombing North Vietnam and sending troops into South Vietnam.

The wargames predicted that this strategy would be ineffective. In the simulations, the bombings did not diminish North Vietnam's capacity nor its desire to support the Viet Cong. The Viet Cong did not require much in the way of supplies anyway, and they got most of their supplies from captured villages within South Vietnam. North Vietnam's economy was almost entirely agricultural, so the loss of what little industry it had caused little political turmoil. They preferred to seek revenge, and so sent more troops into South Vietnam. This forced America into a protracted ground war, which led to erosion of public support that eventually forced America's withdrawal.

The findings of the 1964 wargames were ignored by policymakers. One reason was that Secretary of Defense Robert McNamara did not appreciate the methodology of the games, which relied on subjective evaluations by the umpires (even though these men were seasoned officers and diplomats). McNamara preferred mathematical and statistical analysis. He therefore did not bring the findings to President Johnson's attention. Another reason was that Johnson's strategists did not like the proposed alternatives. Escalating the pressure too much could have drawn the Soviet Union or China into the war, and abandoning the war would have humiliated America.

The Johnson administration went on to apply their strategy of graduated pressure in Vietnam, and the outcome of the war proved very similar to what the wargames had foretold. In their post-mortems of the Vietnam War, numerous historians have cited the dismissal of the Sigma wargames as one of many important failures in planning that led to America's defeat.
