= Okell =

Okell is a surname. Notable people with this surname include:

- Frank Okell (1887-1950), English bishop
- Janet Okell (1922–2005), English wargamer
- John Okell (1934–2020), British linguist
- Marjorie Okell (1908–2009), British athlete
- William Okell, founder of Okells Brewery
