= Cecil Vivian Usborne =

British Royal Navy admiral (1880–1951)

Vice-Admiral Cecil Vivian Usborne CB CMG
- Born: 17 May 1880
- Died: 31 January 1951 (aged 70)
- Military career
- Allegiance: United Kingdom
- Branch: Royal Navy
- Rank: Vice-Admiral
- Awards: Companion of the Order of the Bath; Companion of the Order of St Michael and St George

Vice-Admiral Cecil Vivian Usborne, CB, CMG (17 May 1880 – 31 January 1951) was a high-ranking officer in the British Royal Navy. He served as the Director of Naval Intelligence between 1930 and 1932. His son Henry Usborne was a Member of Parliament 1945–59.

== Naval career ==
Usborne entered the navy as a naval cadet in 1894. He was promoted acting sub-lieutenant in July 1899, and confirmed in this rank in October 1900, and promoted to lieutenant in January 1900. He was further promoted to commander in July 1912,. In 1914 he became Commander on the Battleship Colossus in the Grand Fleet, and in June 1916 took part in the Battle of Jutland. He became a captain before 1918.

Usborne became Assistant Director of Naval Ordnance in January 1919, Deputy Director of Naval Ordnance in July, captain of the cruiser Dragon in June 1921, and Deputy Director of Gunnery Division in August 1922.

In April 1928 he was appointed a Naval aide-de-camp to the King and promoted to rear admiral. He served as the Director of Naval Intelligence between 1930 and 1932. Promotion to vice-admiral came in January 1933.

He retired, and as of 1934 was an under-writing member of Lloyd's.

He was brought back into the Navy during the Second World War as Naval Adviser to the First Sea Lord to develop anti-U-boat weapons. As his assistant he employed Edward Terrell who had developed plastic armour.

Usborne was also Captain of the Tactical School, Portsmouth.

On 1 January 1942, Usborne assigned Commander Gilbert Roberts to establish a wargaming unit at the Western Approaches Command in Liverpool, to analyze U-boat submarine attacks and develop defensive tactics.

== Honours ==
After service during the First World War, he was appointed a Commander of the Greek Order of the Redeemer by Alexander, King of the Hellenes in April 1918, a Companion of the Order of St Michael and St George (CMG) by King George V in June 1918, and an Officer of the French Légion d′honneur in May 1919. In June 1930 he was appointed a Companion of the Order of the Bath (CB)

Military offices
Preceded by Barry Domvile	Director of Naval Intelligence; 1930–1932	Succeeded by Gerald Dickens
