= HMS Tactician (1918) =

S class destroyer

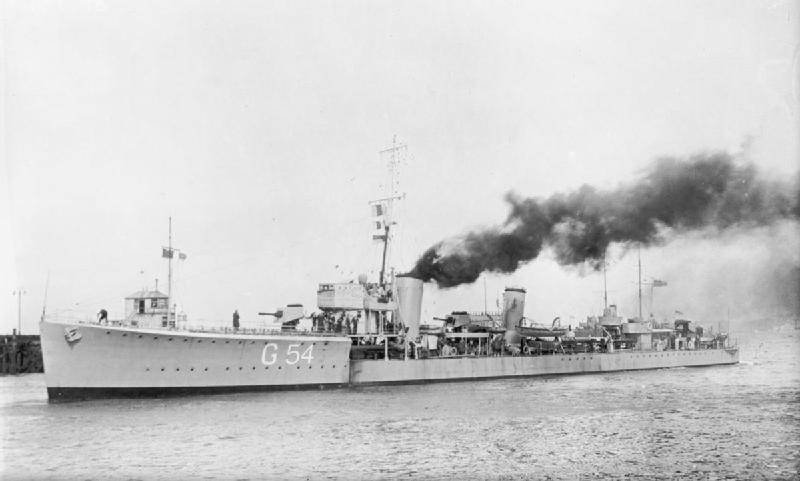
- HMS Tactician undertaking trials in 1919

History

United Kingdom
- Name: HMS Tactician
- Ordered: June 1917
- Builder: Beardmore, Dalmuir
- Yard number: 589
- Laid down: 21 November 1917
- Launched: 7 August 1918
- Completed: 23 October 1918
- Out of service: 5 February 1931
- Fate: Sold to be broken up

General characteristics
- Class & type: S-class destroyer
- Displacement: 1,075 long tons (1,092 t) normal; 1,221 long tons (1,241 t) deep load
- Length: 265 ft (80.8 m) p.p.
- Beam: 26 ft 8 in (8.13 m)
- Draught: 9 ft 10 in (3.00 m) mean
- Propulsion: 3 Yarrow boilers; 2 geared Brown-Curtis steam turbines, 27,000 shp
- Speed: 36 knots (41.4 mph; 66.7 km/h)
- Range: 2,750 nmi (5,090 km) at 15 kn (28 km/h)
- Complement: 90
- Armament: 3 × QF 4-inch (101.6 mm) Mark IV guns, mounting P Mk. IX; 1 × single 2-pounder (40-mm) "pom-pom" Mk. II anti-aircraft gun; 4 × 21 in (533 mm) torpedo tubes (2×2)

HMS Tactician was an S-class destroyer, which served with the Royal Navy. Launched on 7 August 1918, the vessel entered service at the closing of the First World War. The ship joined the Fourteenth Destroyer Flotilla of the Grand Fleet but was placed in Reserve at Nore in 1919. Tactician deteriorated over the following years and was sold to be broken up on 5 February 1931 following the signing of the London Naval Treaty that limited the amount of destroyer tonnage that the Navy could retain.

== Design and development ==
Tactician was one of thirty-three Admiralty S class destroyers ordered by the British Admiralty in June 1917 as part of the Twelfth War Construction Programme. The design was a development of the R class introduced as a cheaper and faster alternative to the V and W class. Differences with the R class were minor, such as having the searchlight moved aft.

Tactician had a overall length of 276 ft (84 m) and a length of 265 ft (81 m) between perpendiculars. Beam was 26 ft 8 in (8.13 m) and draught 9 ft 10 in (3.00 m). Displacement was 1,075 long tons (1,092 t) normal and 1,221 long tons (1,241 t) deep load. Three Yarrow boilers fed steam to two sets of Brown-Curtis geared steam turbines rated at 27,000 shaft horsepower (20,000 kW) and driving two shafts, giving a design speed of 36 knots (67 km/h; 41 mph) at normal loading and 32.5 knots (60.2 km/h; 37.4 mph) at deep load. Two funnels were fitted. The ship carried 301 long tons (306 t) of fuel oil, which gave a design range of 2,750 nautical miles (5,090 km; 3,160 mi) at 15 knots (28 km/h; 17 mph). The ship had a complement of 90 officers and ratings.

Armament consisted of three QF 4-inch (102 mm) Mk IV guns on the ship's centreline. One was mounted raised on the forecastle, one between the funnels on a platform and one aft. The ship also mounted a single 40-millimetre (1.6 in) 2-pounder pom-pom anti-aircraft gun for air defence. Four 21-inch (533 mm) tubes were fitted in two twin rotating mounts aft. The ship was designed to mount two 18-inch (457 mm) torpedo tubes either side of the superstructure but this addition required the forecastle plating to be cut away, making the boats very wet so they were removed. The weight saved enabled the heavier Mark V 21-inch torpedo to be carried. Four depth charge chutes were also fitted aft. Initially, typically ten depth charges were carried. Fire control included a training-only director, single Dumaresq and a Vickers range clock.

== Construction and career ==
Laid down on 21 November 1917 by William Beardmore and Company in Dalmuir with the yard number 589, Tactician was launched on 7 August 1918 and completed on 23 October 1918. The vessel was the first of the name. The yard built the destroyers Tara and Tasmania at the same time. On commissioning, Tactician joined the Fourteenth Destroyer Flotilla of the Grand Fleet. The ship was allocated the pennant number G54.

With the First World War closing, the destroyer saw no action before the Armistice. At the end of the war, the ship remained with the Grand Fleet until it was dissolved. As the navy no longer required such a large active fleet of ships, Tactician was transferred to join sixty-three other destroyers in reserve at Nore. On 22 April 1930, the United Kingdom signed the London Naval Treaty, which limited total destroyer tonnage in the Navy. Having remained on reserve for more than a decade, Tactician was found to be in poor condition and was one of those chosen to be retired. On 5 February 1931, the destroyer was sold to Metal Industries of Charlestown, Fife, and broken up. The ship's badge (displaying a chessboard and the word "Check-mate") was saved and used by the Western Approaches Tactical Unit in Liverpool and Royal Navy Tactical School.
