= Gilbert Roberts (Royal Navy officer) =

Royal Navy Captain (1900–1986)

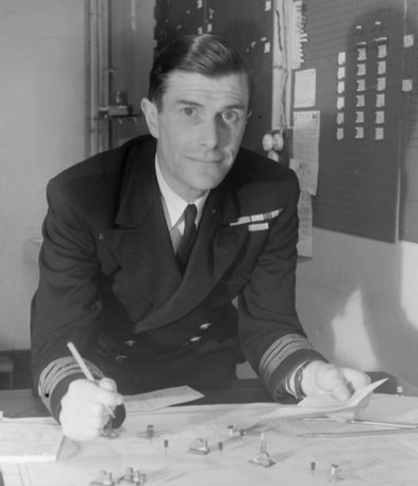
- Born: 11 October 1900; Kensington, England
- Died: 22 January 1986 (aged 85); Torbay, England
- Spouses: Alice Marjorie Brooks (m. 1930, divorced); Jean Winifred Warren (m. 1947)
- Children: 2
- Military career
- Allegiance: (United Kingdom) British Empire
- Branch: (United Kingdom) Royal Navy
- Service years: 1913–1964
- Rank: Captain
- Unit: Western Approaches Tactical Unit
- Awards: CBE (1944); RD (1964)

Gilbert Howland Roberts CBE (11 October 1900 – 22 January 1986) was an officer in the Royal Navy. From 1942 to 1945, Captain Roberts operated a naval wargaming unit based in Liverpool called the Western Approaches Tactical Unit (WATU). This unit developed anti-submarine tactics to defend trans-Atlantic merchant convoys from German submarines.

== Early life ==
Gilbert Roberts was the second son of Sir Howland Roberts, 12th Baronet of Glassenbury, Kent and 5th Baronet of Glassenbury and Britfieldstown, co. Cork.

== Military career ==
Roberts joined the Royal Navy as a cadet in September 1913, a month shy of his thirteenth birthday. His first posting was HMS Hibernia.

From 1936 to 1937 Roberts served on the staff of the Tactical School at Portsmouth. There, he discovered naval wargaming, and became an enthusiastic practitioner. Like many wargaming enthusiasts of his time, he developed his own rules, based mainly on the wargames of Fred T. Jane.

Roberts was given command of the destroyer HMS Fearless in autumn 1937. In December, the Fearless joined a flotilla to patrol the Spanish coast (during Spain's civil war). In late 1938 he developed tuberculosis. (Note: Diagnosed by the surgeon commander on HMS Resolution.) He was deemed medically unfit and retired on 28 October 1938.

Roberts convalesced at the King Edward VII Sanatorium in Midhurst until April 1939. Being unfit for service at the start of the Second World War, he helped train a Home Guard unit in Portsmouth.

On 1 January 1942 Roberts met with Admiral Cecil Usborne in London. Usborne ordered Roberts to report to the Western Approaches headquarters in Liverpool, where he was to establish the Western Approaches Tactical Unit. This organisation developed tactics by which shipping convoys in the Atlantic could defend themselves from German submarine attacks. Through the use of wargames, performed by a combination of WRENs and Royal Navy officers, he studied the reports of convoy escorts, devised defensive tactics, and trained escort commanders in their use.

In 1944, Roberts was tasked with planning the anti-submarine operations that supported Operation Overlord. These proved highly effective.

According to his colleagues and staffers, Roberts was a difficult man to work for. He was noted for being pushy, stubborn, and intolerant of disagreement. Nevertheless, he was liked and respected by his staff. It is suggested his abrasive personality was aggravated by his illness.

In 1945, Robert visited the Germans' U-boat headquarters in Flensburg. On the wall, he found a portrait of himself, taken from a 1944 article from Illustrated magazine. Allegedly, it bore the caption: "This is your enemy, Captain Roberts, Director of Anti U-boat Tactics", though Roberts didn't mention this caption in his memoirs. He did autograph the portrait for the pleasure of the Germans present.

=== Ranks ===
Promotions
Rank	Date
Naval Cadet	15 September 1913
Midshipman	1 January 1917
Acting Sub-Lieutenant	15 November 1918
Sub-Lieutenant	15 July 1919
Acting Lieutenant	15 July 1921
Lieutenant	15 October 1920
Lieutenant-Commander	15 October 1928
Commander	30 June 1935
Acting Captain	6 November 1942
Captain (Retired)	3 September 1945

=== Awards ===
- Commander of the Most Excellent Order of the British Empire (1944)
- Knight Commander’s Order of St Olav of Norway
- Commander’s Order of Polonia Restituta of Poland
- Officer’s Order of the Legion of Honour of France

== Family ==
Gilbert Howland Roberts was born on 11 October 1900. He married, his first wife, Marjorie Brooks on 15 October 1930. They had two children: Michael Gilbert Roberts, born 1932 and Jill Morna Boultbee Roberts, born 1933. He and Marjorie Brooks were divorced in 1947.

He married, his second wife, Jean Warren on 23 August 1947.

He died in January 1986 at age 85 at Torbay, Devon, England.

== Bibliography ==
- Mark Williams (1979). Captain Gilbert Roberts R. N. and the Anti-U-Boat School. Cassell. ISBN 0-304-30386-0.
- Simon Parkin (2019). A Game of Birds and Wolves: The Secret Game that Won the War. Hodder & Staughton. ISBN 9781529353051.
