= Fleet Orders =

Fleet Orders were printed routine orders which were issued by the Admiralty to ships of the Royal Navy from 1909 to 1964.
