= Simon Parkin =

English journalist and writer

- Born: United Kingdom
- Occupations: Journalist, writer
- Writing career
- Genres: Journalism, non-fiction, video games, historical non-fiction

Simon Parkin is an English writer. He is a contributing writer for The New Yorker, a critic for The Observer, and the author of four non-fiction books. He is the host of the My Perfect Console podcast, in which notable guests present five video games that have been meaningful in their lives.

Parkin has been the recipient of two awards from the Society of Professional Journalists. His book A Game of Birds and Wolves was shortlisted for the 2020 Mountbatten Award for Best Book. His book The Island of Extraordinary Captives was one of the New Yorker's Best Books of 2022, and winner of the 2023 Wingate Prize. His book The Forbidden Garden of Leningrad was a finalist in the 2025 Orwell Prize for political writing.

== Career ==
Parkin began contributing to The New Yorker, where he often writes about technology, in 2013. In 2016 he became the first video game critic for The Observer, contributing to The New Review, the paper's critics' pages. Parkin has also written long-form journalism for Harpers, The New York Times and is a regular contributor to The Guardian's Long Read.

His 2016 Harper's Magazine story "So Subtle a Catch", which investigates the widespread theft of carp from British lakes, was included in the 2017 edition of The Best American Nonrequired Reading.

The New York Times has praised Parkin's "literary eye for scenic and investigative detail" and described his criticism on gaming and play as "thoughtful and serious." The Library Journal has described Parkin's journalism as "groundbreaking", claiming that "his reportage leads to brilliant, fresh insights."

Parkin has been both a critic of and advocate for the video game medium. "Tabloids are forever blaming video games for their role in the latest school shooting," he said in a 2016 interview with Salon. "That kind of reporting is increasingly passé, simply because most readers under the age of 45 have grown up with video games in their entertainment diet so the pariah schtick doesn't work on them... That said, game industry leaders have often failed to deal with these scandals in a mature way. It's possible to acknowledge that you’re not part of a problem while simultaneously offering ideas for how you might be part of the solution."

In a separate interview with The Guardian, Parkin argued that "the ability that video games have to allow us to inhabit another person or another position in life, or another race or gender, is hugely powerful, and something that we’ve only just started to explore."

Parkin has been the recipient of two awards for "Excellence in Feature Writing" from the Society of Professional Journalists and was a finalist in the British Foreign Press Awards for his reporting on the thirtieth anniversary of the Chernobyl Nuclear Disaster.

Parkin's first non-fiction book, Death by Video Game is an investigation into a number of deaths at Internet cafes in Taiwan, where the deceased had spent extended periods of time playing online video games immediately prior to their death. It was published in the UK in August 2015 by Serpent's Tail and in the US in July 2016 by Melville House Publishing.

The Library Journal claimed "this work ignites a series of debates crucial to the future of video games", while The Washington Post praised Parkin's "deft sense of the ways that video games appeal to and satiate the longings of the spirit" describing the book as "an excellent sociocultural study of the 21st century's quintessential art form."

Parkin's second book, A Game of Birds and Wolves is a narrative non-fiction history book exploring the contribution of a group of wargaming experts, known as the Western Approaches Tactical Unit, to the Battle of the Atlantic during the Second World War. The New York Times selected the book as an Editor's Choice. A Game of Birds and Wolves was shortlisted for the 2020 Mountbatten Award for Best Book.

A film adaptation of A Game of Birds and Wolves, is in development at Steven Spielberg's production company Amblin Partners and DreamWorks Pictures, with a screenplay by Vicky Jones.

Parkin's third non-fiction book titled The Island of Extraordinary Captives tells the story of Hutchinson Internment Camp, an internment camp established on the Isle of Man during the Second World War to house so-called 'enemy aliens'. The book follows the story of the artist Peter Midgley who, having fled to Britain on the Kindertransport was interned in the camp, alongside well-known European artists such as Kurt Schwitters. Writing in The Sunday Times, the historian Max Hastings described the book as "vivid and moving," arguing that it "spotlights a sorry aspect of Britain’s war that deserves to be better known."

Parkin's fourth non-fiction book is titled The Forbidden Garden of Leningrad and tells the story of the botanists who worked at the Institute of Plant Industry during the siege of Leningrad, many of whom gave their lives to save the seed bank's collection. Writing for The Guardian, Charlie English described the book as 'a richly researched and meticulously observed account of a little-explored corner of 20th-century history', while in the London Review of Books Jessie Childs wrote that 'the story raises important issues about the extent to which scientific progress can justify social neglect, about the ethics of collection and curation, and about our responsibilities not only to each other, but also to future generations.' The book was a finalist in the 2025 Orwell Prize.

== Identification of German wartime spy ==
In his 2022 book The Island of Extraordinary Captives, Parkin named the previously unidentified sitter in a Kurt Schwitters portrait as the German spy Ludwig Warschauer. Warschauer came to Britain in 1939 as a representative for the Tefifon recording device, and was interned in Hutchinson Internment Camp, where he became the subject of a major MI5 investigation.

According to the Guardian newspaper, Warschauer had "powerful British allies, including the Conservative MP Sir Herbert Williams, 1st Baronet, chairman of the company financing the Tefifon’s development, and the Home Secretary John Anderson, 1st Viscount Waverley, who came to his home to watch a demonstration of the Tefifon." Warschauer later confessed to having been sent to Britain by a Gestapo handler to conduct espionage for Germany, as documented in a series of British intelligence files. He was deported in 1945. The portrait's sitter was identified by Monica Shubert, Warschauer's step-daughter, who recognised the painting from her childhood. Its current whereabouts are unknown.

== Bibliography ==
=== Books ===
- Death by Video Game: Tales of Obsession from the Virtual Frontline. London: Serpent's Tail, 2015. ISBN 978-1-781254-21-9. UK edition.
  - Death by Video Game: Danger, Pleasure, and Obsession on the Virtual Frontline. New York: Melville House, 2016. ISBN 978-1612196206. US edition.
- A Game of Birds and Wolves: The Secret Game that Won the War London: Sceptre, 2019. ISBN 978-1-529353-03-7. UK edition.
  - A Game of Birds and Wolves: The Ingenious Young Women Whose Secret Board Game Helped Win World War II. New York: Little, Brown, 2020. ISBN 978-0-316492-09-6. US edition.
- The Island of Extraordinary Captives: A True Story of an Artist, a Spy and a Wartime Scandal London: Sceptre, 2022. ISBN 978-1-529347-22-7. UK edition.
  - The Island of Extraordinary Captives: A Painter, a Poet, an Heiress, and a Spy in a World War II British Internment Camp New York: Scribner, 2022. ISBN 978-1-982178-52-9. US edition.
- The Forbidden Garden of Leningrad: A True Story of Science and Sacrifice in a City under Siege London: Sceptre, 2024. ISBN 978-1399714-55-6. UK edition.
  - The Forbidden Garden: The Botanists of Besieged Leningrad and Their Impossible Choice. New York: Scribner, 2024. ISBN 978-1668007-66-2. US edition.
