= Recreational wargaming =

Aspect of gaming

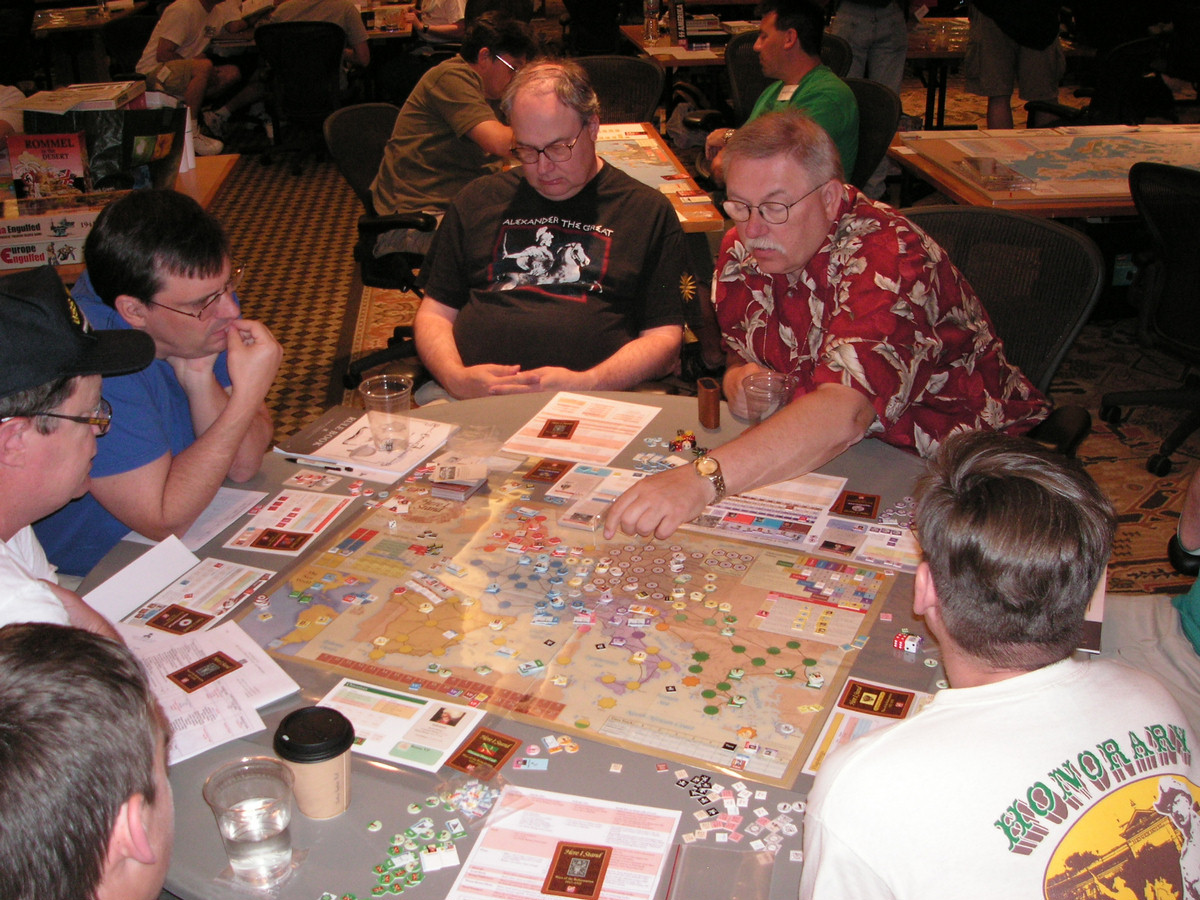
A recreational wargame (Here I Stand) in play at CSW Expo 2009.

A wargame is a strategy game that realistically simulates warfare. Wargames were invented for the purpose of training military officers, but they eventually caught on in civilian circles, played recreationally.

== History ==
=== Early German wargames (1780-1806) ===
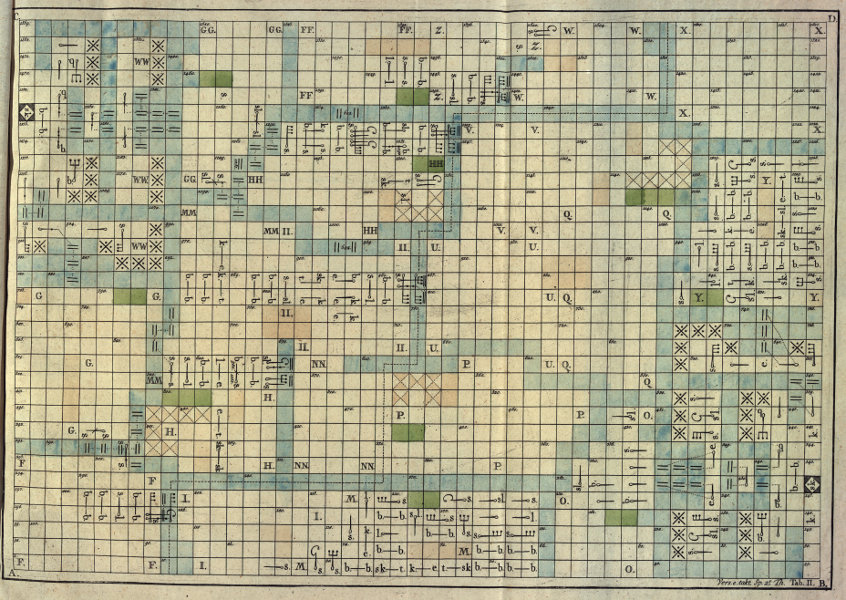
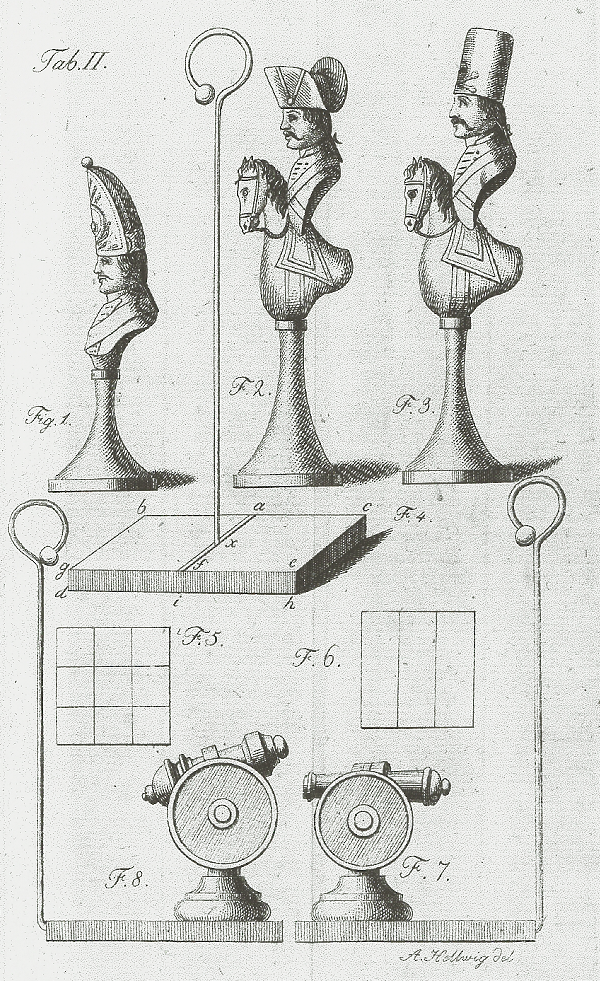
The playing field and pieces from Hellwig's wargame.

The first wargame was invented in Prussia in 1780 by Johann Christian Ludwig Hellwig, who was a college professor in Braunschweig. Hellwing wanted to design a game by which he could teach some principles of warfare to his students, many of whom were noblemen destined for military service, but he also wanted his game to be fun and accessible to the general public so that he could sell it as a leisure game. Hellwig chose to base his game on chess, believing that this would attract chess players and make it easier for them to learn the rules. Hellwig published a second edition of his rulebook in 1803.

As in chess, Hellwig's game was played on a grid of squares, but it was a much larger grid, and the squares were color-coded to represent different types of terrain: mountains, swamp, water, trenches, etc. The layout of the terrain was not fixed, which allowed players to create their own custom battlefields. The pieces in the game represented real military units: cavalry, infantry, artillery, and various support units. As in chess, only a single piece could occupy a square, and the pieces moved square by square, either laterally or diagonally. Over normal terrain, infantry could move a maximum distance of eight squares, dragoons could move twelve squares, and light cavalry could move sixteen squares — intuitively mirroring the speed at which these units move in the real world. But terrain could impede movement: mountains were impassable, swamps slowed units down, rivers could only be crossed with the help of a special pontoon unit, etc. A player could only move one piece per turn, or one group of pieces if they were arranged in a rectangle. A piece could capture an enemy piece by moving into its square, just like in chess, but infantry and artillery pieces could also shoot enemy pieces, at a maximum ranges of two to three squares. Unlike chess, the pieces had orientation: for instance, an infantry piece could only shoot an enemy piece if they were facing it and flanking it. Hellwig's wargame could also simulate the fog of war to a limited degree: while the players were arranging their pieces in their starting positions, they had the option of placing a screen across the board so that they could not observe their opponent's arrangement until the game started. Once the game was in progress, however, there was no hiding anything.

Hellwig's wargame was a great success, and inspired other inventors to develop their own chess-like wargames.

In 1796, another Prussian named Johann Georg Julius Venturini invented his own wargame, inspired by Hellwig's game. Venturini's game was played on an even larger grid. Venturini's game also added rules governing logistics, such as supply convoys and mobile bakeries, and the effects of weather and seasons, making it perhaps the first operational-level wargame.

In 1806, an Austrian named Johann Ferdinand Opiz developed a wargame aimed at both civilian and military markets. Like Hellwig's game, it used a modular grid-based board. But unlike Hellwig's game, Opiz's game used dice rolls to simulate the unpredictability of real warfare. This innovation was controversial at the time. Hellwig, who designed his wargame for both leisure as well as instruction, felt that introducing chance would spoil the fun.

These games were popular among recreational gamers, but were not taken seriously by an army because they were too unrealistic. The chess-like grid forced the terrain into unnatural forms, such as rivers that flowed in straight lines and turned at right angles. A unit could only move from one square to the next, not within the square, and only a single unit could occupy a square at a time, even if that square represented a square mile.

=== Kriegsspiel ===
In 1824, a Prussian army officer named Georg Heinrich Rudolf Johann von Reisswitz developed a more realistic wargame specifically for the Prussian army. Instead of a chess-like grid, the game was played on accurate topographical maps of the kind the Prussian army used in the field. This allowed the game to model terrain naturally and simulate battles in real locations. The scale of the map was 1:8000; smaller than any wargame before it. Troop formations were represented by little rectangular pieces made of lead, which were painted either blue or red to represent the side they belonged to. Reisswitz used data collected during the Napoleonic Wars to accurately model how the units performed in battle. For instance, his manual provided tables which listed how far each unit type could move in a round over various types of terrain. The game used dice to model variable weapon damage, and firearm damage generally decreased the farther away the target was. Unlike chess pieces, the units could suffer partial losses before being defeated, which were tracked on a separate sheet of paper; Reisswitz's wargame was the first to use unit hitpoints. The most important innovation was perhaps the introduction of an umpire. The players did not move the pieces across the map themselves. Instead, they wrote orders for their troops on scraps of paper which they discreetly submitted to the umpire, and the umpire would move the pieces according to how he judged the virtual troops would carry out their orders. The umpire also managed secret information such as the locations of hidden units. The umpire only placed a piece on the map when he judged that the unit in question had entered the enemy's line of sight; this was the first wargame to properly simulate the fog of war.

A number of privately-funded kriegsspiel clubs were formed in Prussia. They were mainly frequented by army officers, but some had civilian members as well, so kriegsspiel was certainly being played recreationally during this time.

In 1870, Prussia defeated France in the Franco-Prussian War. The Prussian army did not have any significant advantage in weaponry, numbers, or troop training, but it was the only army in the world that practiced wargaming, so naturally many people credited Prussia's victory to its wargaming tradition. Armies around the world now took an interest in German wargames, which they referred to as kriegsspiel (the German word for "wargame"). Kriegsspiel also gained a substantial following among civilian gamers. The world's first recreational wargaming club was the University Kriegspiel [sic] Club, founded in 1873 at Oxford University in England.

=== Miniature wargaming ===
In 1881, the Scottish writer Robert Louis Stevenson became the first documented person to use toy soldiers in a wargame, although he never published his rules. According to an account by his stepson, they were very sophisticated and realistic; on par with German military wargames. In his game, each toy soldier was used to represent an entire unit rather than an individual, and his playing field was just a chalk map drawn on the floor.

In 1898, the British writer Fred T. Jane published the first rulebook for a naval wargame: Rules for the Jane Naval War Game. Jane's wargame was also the first published wargame to use miniature models. It used scale models of warships made out of cork and wires; the wires were used for guns and masts. Jane's rulebook described in great detail the capabilities of the warships, such as the range and armor-penetrating power of the guns. It also simulated localized damage, such as what would happen to a warship if its boiler was damaged, or its gun battery.

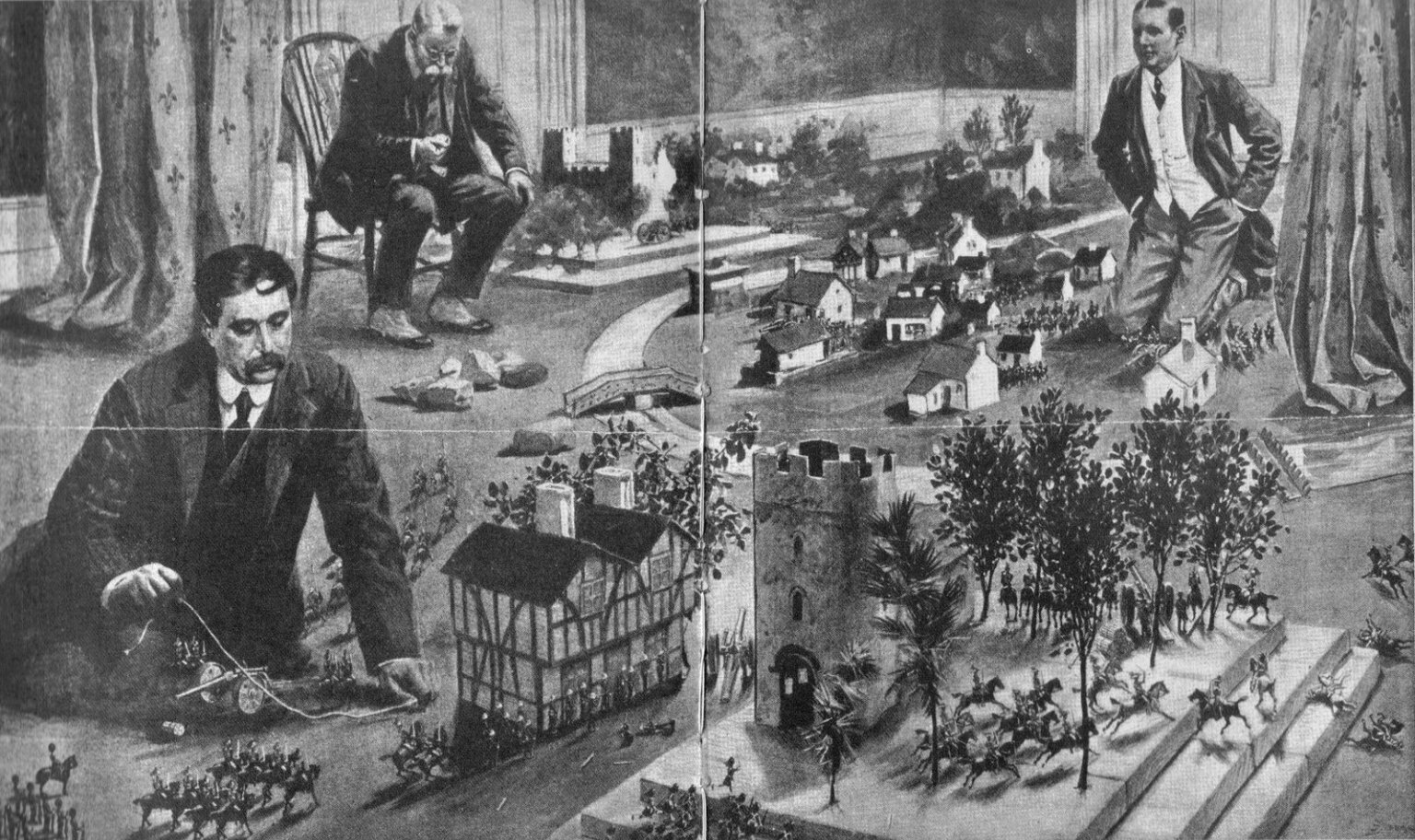
H. G. Wells and his friends playing Little Wars.

The English writer H. G. Wells developed his own codified rules for playing with toy soldiers, which he published in a book titled Little Wars (1913). This is widely remembered as the first rulebook for miniature wargaming (for terrestrial armies, at least). Little Wars had very simple rules to make it fun and accessible to anyone. Little Wars did not use dice or computation to resolve fights. For artillery attacks, players used spring-loaded toy cannons which fired little wooden cylinders to physically knock over enemy models. As for infantry and cavalry, they could only engage in hand-to-hand combat (even if the figurines exhibited firearms). When two infantry units fought in close quarters, the units would suffer non-random losses determined by their relative sizes. Little Wars was designed for a large field of play, such as a lawn or the floor of a large room. An infantryman could move up to one foot per turn, and a cavalryman could move up to two feet per turn. To measure these distances, players used a two-foot long piece of string. Wells was also the first wargamer to use scale models of buildings, trees, and other terrain features to create a three-dimensional battlefield.

Wells' rulebook failed to invigorate the miniature wargaming community. A possible reason was the two World Wars, which de-glamorized war and caused shortages of tin and lead that made model soldiers expensive. Another reason may have been the lack of magazines or clubs dedicated to miniature wargames. Miniature wargaming was seen as a niche within the larger hobby of making and collecting model soldiers.

In 1955, a California man named Jack Scruby began making inexpensive miniature models for miniature wargames out of type metal. Scruby's major contribution to the miniature wargaming hobby was to network players across America and the UK. At the time, the miniature wargaming community was minuscule, and players struggled to find each other. In 1956, Scruby organized the first miniature wargaming convention in America, which was attended by just fourteen people. From 1957 to 1962, he self-published the world's first wargaming magazine, titled The War Game Digest, through which wargamers could publish their rules and share game reports. It had fewer than two hundred subscribers, but it did establish a community that kept growing.

Around the same time in the United Kingdom, Donald Featherstone began writing an influential series of books on wargaming, which represented the first mainstream published contribution to wargaming since Little Wars. Titles included: War Games (1962), Advanced Wargames, Solo Wargaming, Wargame Campaigns, Battles with Model Tanks, Skirmish Wargaming. Such titles were popular enough that other authors were able to publish wargaming titles. This output of published wargaming titles from British authors coupled with the emergence at the same time of several manufacturers providing suitable wargame miniatures (e.g. Miniature Figurines, Hinchliffe, Peter Laing, Garrisson, Skytrex, Davco, Heroic & Ros) was responsible for the huge upsurge of popularity of the hobby in the late 1960s and into the 1970s.

In 1956, Tony Bath published the first ruleset for a miniature wargame set in the medieval period. These rules were a major inspiration for Gary Gygax's Chainmail (1971).

From 1983 to 2010, Games Workshop produced the first miniature wargame designed to be used with proprietary models: Warhammer Fantasy. Earlier miniature wargames were designed to be played using generic models that could be bought from any manufacturer, but Warhammer Fantasy's setting featured original characters with distinctive visual designs, and their models were produced exclusively by Games Workshop.

=== Board wargaming (1954-1970) ===
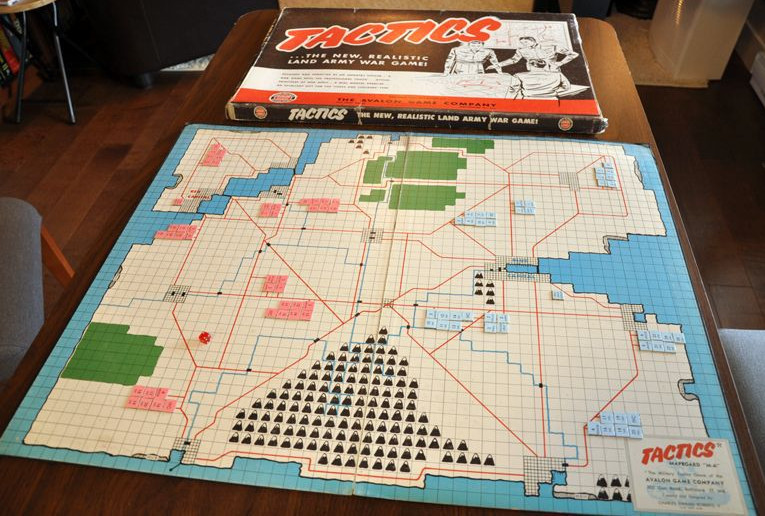
Tactics (1954) was the first successful board wargame.

The first successful commercial board wargame was Tactics (1954) by an American named Charles S. Roberts. What distinguished this wargame from previous ones is that it was mass-produced and all the necessary materials for play were bundled together in a box. Previous wargames were often just a rulebook and required players to obtain the other materials themselves. The game was played on a pre-fabricated board with a fixed layout, which is why it was called a board game.

Roberts later founded the Avalon Hill Game Company, the first firm that specialized in commercial wargames. In 1958, Avalon Hill released Gettysburg, which was a retooling of the rules of Tactics, and was based on the historical Battle of Gettysburg. Gettysburg became the most widely-played wargame yet.

Board wargames were more popular than miniature wargames in the USA, unlike in the UK where miniatures dominated through hobby press and conventions. One reason was that assembling a playset for miniature wargaming was expensive, time-consuming, and required artisanal skill. Another reason was that board wargames could be played by correspondence. Board wargames were usually grid-based, or else designed in some way that moves could be explained in writing in simple terms. This was not possible with the free-form nature of miniature wargames.

=== 1980s - a smaller but continuing presence ===
The wargaming hobby declined in the 1980s. One factor was competition from role-playing games such as Dungeons and Dragons: the sort of person who would have gone into wargaming instead went into RPGs. A second factor was the rise of affordable and powerful personal computers and gaming consoles. Computer wargames were easier to learn and faster to play because the routine procedures and arithmetic were automated.

=== New Millennium ===
The turn of the millennium saw a resurgence in miniature wargaming. Magazines such as Miniature Wargames and Wargames Illustrated continue to thrive. Increased hobby time for baby boomers reaching retirement provided a ready market for highly detailed 28mm figures such as those produced by Warlord Games. Founded in 2007, the company has followed a similar model to that of Games Workshop, producing figures and rules designed to be used together. Other scales, such as 15mm, have also thrived. New Zealand's Battlefront Miniatures, founded in 2002, also followed a GW marketing strategy, linking rules and figure manufacturing.

== Sources ==
- Caffrey, Matthew B. Jr. (2019). "On Wargaming: How Wargames Have Shaped History and How They May Shape the Future". The Newport Papers (43). Naval War College Press (US). ISBN 978-1-935352-65-5.
- Donovan, Tristan (2017). It's All a Game: The History of Board Games from Monopoly to Settlers of Catan. Macmillan. ISBN 9781250082732.
- Harrigan, Pat; Kirschenbaum, Matthew G., eds. (2016). Zones of Control: Perspectives on Wargaming. MIT Press. ISBN 9780262033992.
- "Foreign War Games". Selected Professional Papers Translated from European Military Publications. Translated by Heistand, H. O. S. Washington D.C.: US Government Printing Office. 1898. pp. 233–289.
- Hellwig, Johann Christian Ludwig (1803). Das Kriegsspiel [The Wargame] (in German).
- Nohr, Rolf F.; Böhme, Stefan (2009). Die Auftritte des Krieges sinnlich machen. Appelhans-Verlag Braunschweig. ISBN 978-3-941737-02-0.
- Perla, Peter P. (2012) [1990]. John Curry (ed.). Peter Perla's The Art of Wargaming: A Guide for Professionals and Hobbyists. The History of Wargaming Project. ISBN 978-1-4716-2242-7.
- Peterson, Jon (2012). Playing at the World: A History of Simulating Wars, People and Fantastic Adventures, from Chess to Role-playing Games. Unreason Press. ISBN 9780615642048.
- Schuurman, Paul (2017). "Models of war 1770–1830: the birth of wargames and the trade-off between realism and simplicity". History of European Ideas. 43 (5): 442–455. doi:10.1080/01916599.2017.1366928. hdl:1765/101998.
- van Creveld, Martin (2013). Wargames: From Gladiators to Gigabytes. Cambridge University Press. ISBN 9781107036956.
- von Reisswitz, B. (1824). Anleitung zur Darstellung militairische Manover mit dem Apparat des Kriegsspiel [Instructions for the Representation of Military Manoeuvres with the Kriegsspiel Apparatus] (in German). (translation by Bill Leeson, 1989)
