= Commander-in-Chief, Western Approaches =

WW2 Royal Navy command position, based in Liverpool, England

Coordinates: 53.4074°N 2.9932°W

Western Approaches Command
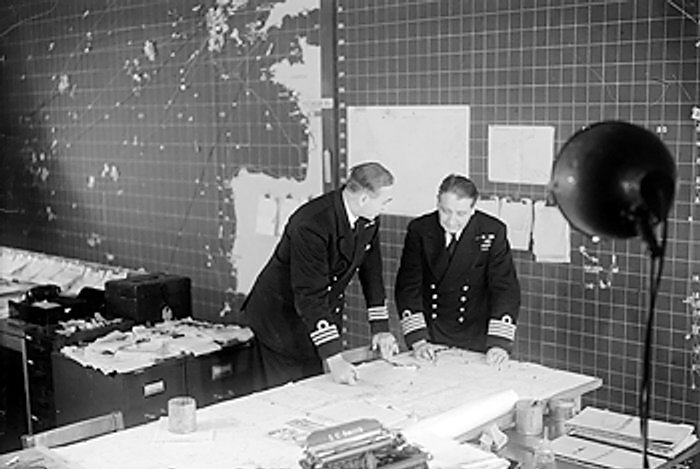
- Commander RDS Crosse, Staff Officer Convoys, (left) discussing a special convoy movement map with Captain Lake, RN, Duty Officer in the Operations Room at Derby House, Liverpool.
- Active: 1939–1945
- Country: United Kingdom
- Branch: Royal Navy
- Type: Military formation
- Part of: Royal Navy
- Garrison/HQ: Liverpool

Commanders
- Notable commanders: Martin Dunbar-Nasmith (1939–1941); Percy Noble (1941–1942); Max Horton (1942–1945)

Commander-in-Chief, Western Approaches was the commander of a major operational command of the Royal Navy during World War II. The admiral commanding, and his forces, sometimes informally known as 'Western Approaches Command,' were responsible for the safety of British shipping in the Western Approaches.

== History ==
Admiral Martin Dunbar-Nasmith, who had been Commander-in-Chief, Plymouth, also took over responsibility for the Western Approaches from the start of World War II.

After the fall of France in June 1940, the main North Atlantic convoy routes were diverted around the north of Ireland through the north-western approaches. By late 1940, the location of the Combined Operations headquarters at Plymouth was increasingly awkward and the decision was taken to move the Combined Operations headquarters to Liverpool. On 7 February 1941, the headquarters was established at Derby House, Liverpool, with a secondary control bunker built in Magee College, Derry. Derby House was designated HMS Eaglet; shore establishments were often given ship ("stone frigate") names to meet the requirement that their Navy personnel be borne upon the books of a specific ship. The headquarters of No. 15 Group RAF (part of Coastal Command) moved to Liverpool at the same time. On 17 February 1941 Admiral Sir Percy Noble was appointed as the new Commander-in-Chief, Western Approaches Command. The Western Approaches Tactical Unit (WATU) was formed in January 1942 to develop and disseminate new tactics to counter German submarine attacks on trans-Atlantic shipping convoys. WATU took up residency on the top floor of Derby House.

Over the next two years, Admiral Noble built up the bases for the North Atlantic escort groups at Greenock on the Clyde, Derry and Liverpool and set up the training facilities that were the foundations for eventual victory in the Battle of the Atlantic.

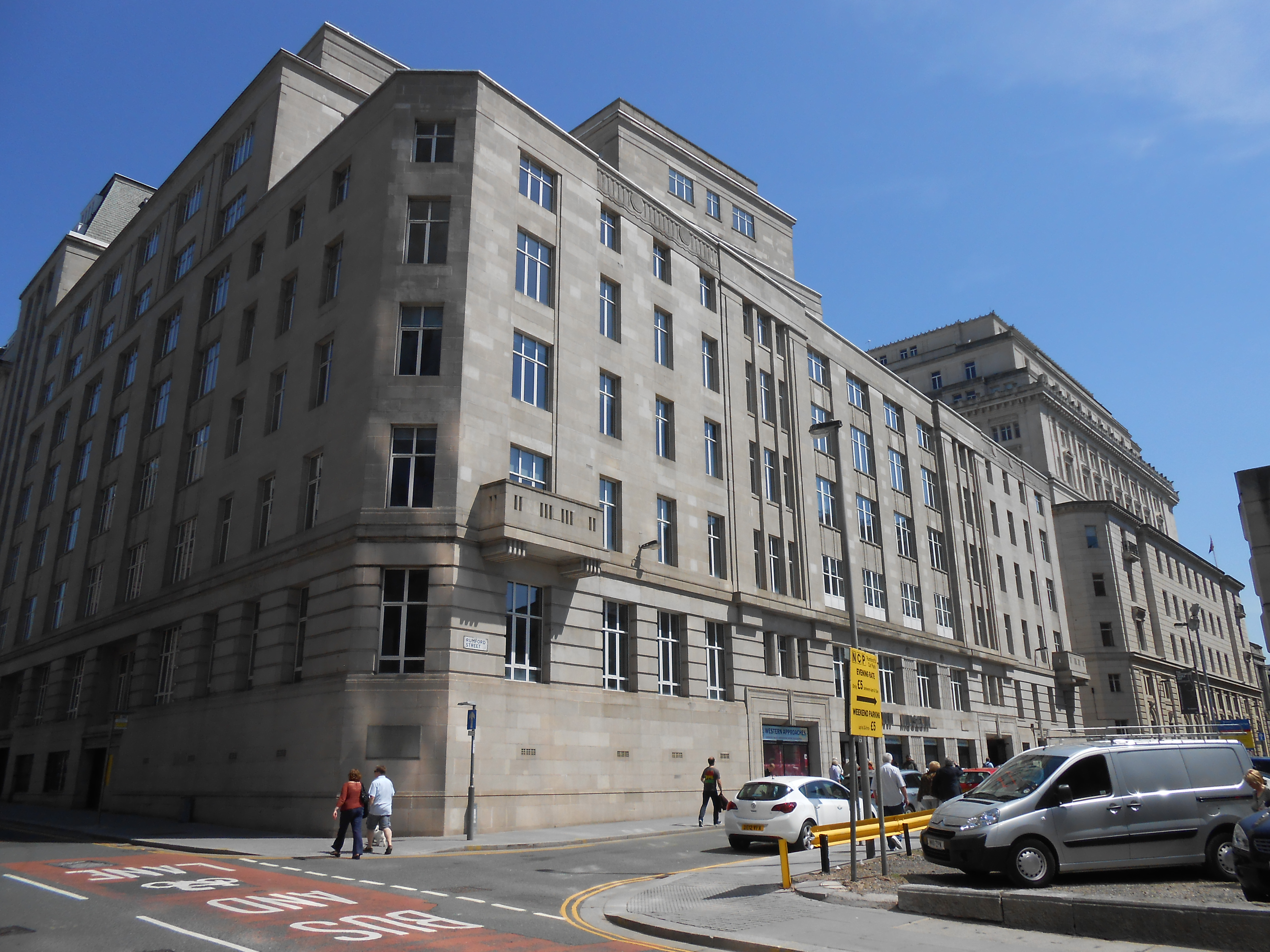
Derby House, Liverpool, in 2013

On 19 November 1942, Admiral Max Horton replaced Admiral Noble; Horton then was Commander-in-Chief until Western Approaches Command closed on 15 August 1945.

Horton’s leadership played a vital role in the final defeat of the U-boat menace. Horton used the increasing number of escorts that were available to the command to organize "support groups" that were used to reinforce convoys that came under attack. Unlike the regular escort groups, the support groups were not directly responsible for the safety of any particular convoy. This freedom gave them much greater tactical flexibility, allowing the support groups to detach ships to hunt submarines spotted by reconnaissance or picked up by high-frequency direction finding (HF/DF). In situations where the regular escorts would have had to return to their convoy, the support groups were able to persist in hunting a submarine for many hours until it was forced to the surface.

The Western Approaches Tactical Unit (WATU) was also based in Western Approaches HQ and was located in the top floor of the original Exchange Buildings on the opposite side of Exchange Square to Derby House. The unit was commanded by Captain Gilbert Roberts and was staffed almost entirely by women.

== Museum ==
The reinforced central core of the command bunker at Derby House proved too costly to demolish, and so whilst the rest of the building has been converted to modern offices, the bunker has been restored as a museum, open to the public since 1993. The areas open to visitors are only a small part of the original complex. The museum is known as the Western Approaches Museum.

Following years of neglect, the site was taken over by non-profit organisation Big Heritage in 2017, which saw an extensive restoration of the site and the discovery of new hidden parts of the bunker complex . The reopened site has seen a large increase in visitor numbers, and now ranks as one of the most popular historic sites in Liverpool.

During the lockdown as a result of COVID-19, Big Heritage reopened several previously undiscovered rooms, as well as restored the main chart in the operations room.

== Commanders-in-Chief, Western Approaches ==
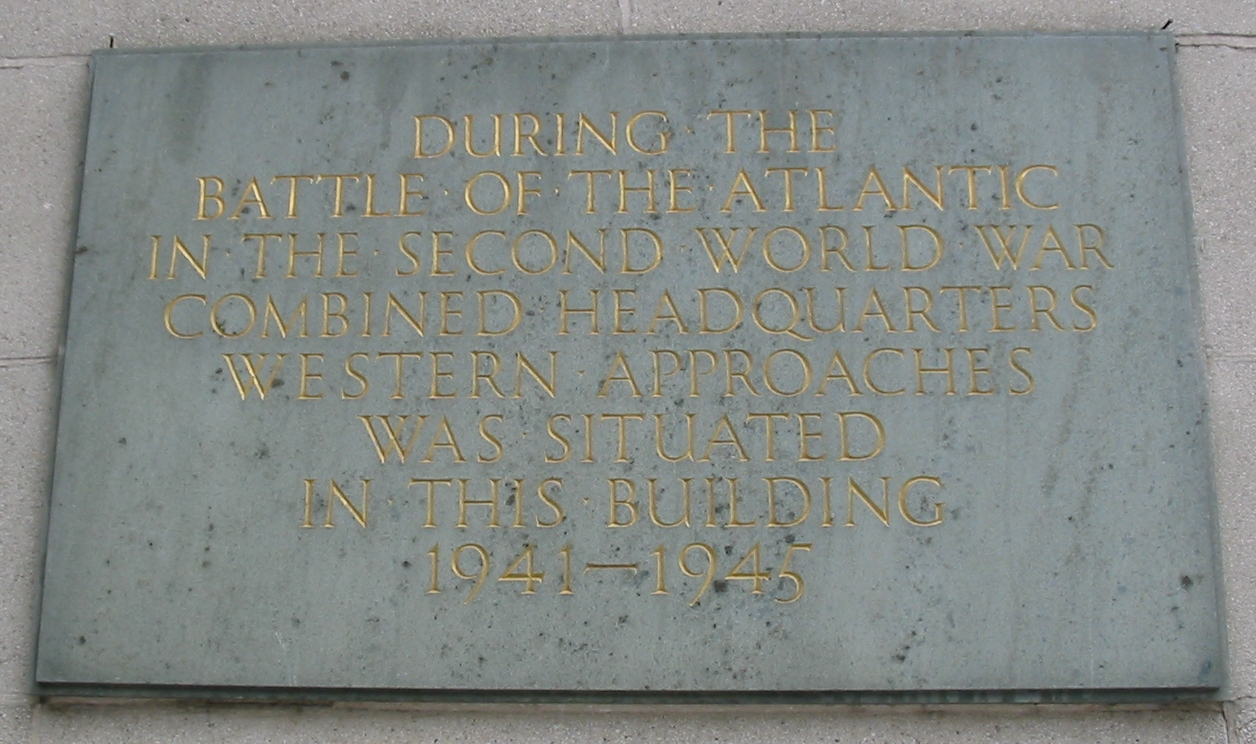
Plaque in Liverpool at Western Approaches HQ

Commander-in-Chief, Western Approaches
Rank	Name	Term began	Term ended
Admiral	Martin Dunbar-Nasmith	9 September 1939	17 February 1941
Admiral	Sir Percy Noble	17 February 1941	19 November 1942
Admiral	Max Horton	19 November 1942	15 August 1945

== See also ==
- Anti-submarine warfare
- U-boat
- Battle of the Atlantic (1939–1945)
