= The Tsolyáni Language =

Fantasy tabletop role-playing game supplement

The Tsolyáni Language, Part I & II
- First printing, 1977
- Designers: M. A. R. Barker
- Publishers: Self published through Richfield Printing
- Publication: 1977; 48 years ago
- Genres: Fantasy
- Systems: none

The Tsolyáni Language, Part I and The Tsolyáni Language, Part II are a pair of 1977 fantasy tabletop role-playing game supplements.

== Contents ==
The Tsolyáni Language, Volume One is a supplement that explores the basic points of the Tsolyáni language and presents discussion of how its pronunciation and grammar function, while Volume Two is a vocabulary of English to Tsolyani words.

== History ==
Originally self published in 1978 through Richfield Printing. A second printing was published in 1981 by Dave Arneson’s Adventure Games, and included a cassette tape to demonstrate pronunciation. Tita’s House of Games reprinted the books in 1999 along with a compact disc version of the cassette. Finally in 2005 an online pdf edition was released without the audio.

1981 Second printing, Adventure Games

== Reception ==
Frederick Paul Kiesche III reviewed The Tsolyáni Language, Volumes I & II in Space Gamer No. 71. Kiesche commented that "These volumes are highly technical and not for casual reading. Given Professor Barker's linguistic background, they are technically correct (and a little dry). They are not meant for every gamer or referee, but if you want to add an exceptional amount of realism to a game of EPT/S&G, this will prove to be an invaluable guide."
