= Legions of the Petal Throne =

Fantasy tabletop wargame

Fantasy Miniatures Wargame Rules for the World of Tekumel
- Cover
- Designers: Dave Sutherland
- Publishers: TSR
- Publication: 1977; 48 years ago
- Genres: Fantasy miniatures wargame

Legions of the Petal Throne is a set of combat rules for large-scale wargaming published by TSR in 1977. The rules' setting is based on TSR's role-playing game Empire of the Petal Throne.

== Publication history ==
In 1975, TSR published M.A.R. Barker's fantasy role-playing game Empire of the Petal Throne, set in the land of Tékumel.

In his 2014 book Designers & Dragons, Shannon Appelcline noted that after publishing Empire of the Petal Throne, TSR "offered no roleplaying support for Tékumel except in Dragon magazine, though they did put out one more Tékumel strategy game, the miniatures-based Legion of the Petal Throne (1977)."

Legions of the Petal Throne is a set of rules designed by Dave Sutherland that can be used for army-sized combat using military figurines. Basic combat rules are given, using a typical wargaming scale of 1:100. A more detailed and complex set of rules, including the use of magic, is also included.

== Reception ==
In the October–November 1978 edition of White Dwarf (Issue #9), John Norris commented that the rules "seem to have been well thought out and allow an interesting magical duel which both sides can use skilfully to influence the course of the battle without either swamping the combat with magic so that the former is almost irrelevant or reducing magic to an occasional unpredictable event that upsets the battle." He complimented author Dave Sutherland for producing "a good simulation of the rather formal warfare characteristic of Tekumel, with lots of colourful detail." However, given that the game was obviously related to the Empire of the Petal Throne RPG, Norris believed the lack of any type of role for individual characters from the RPG was "an obvious omission." He concluded by giving the game a below average rating of 6 out of 10.

== See also ==
- Qadardalikoi, a 1983 Tékumel miniatures wargame
- The Armies of Tékumel, six army supplements for Tékumel miniatures wargaming, 1978-1998
- EPT Miniatures, a 1983 set of miniatures for Tékumel wargaming
