= Critical hit =

Game term

In many role-playing games and video games, a critical hit (or crit) is a chance that a successful attack will deal more damage than a normal blow.

The concept of critical hits originates from wargames and role-playing games, as a way to simulate lucky attacks, and crossed over into video games in the 1986 JRPG Dragon Quest, set at a fixed rate of 1/64 (~1.56%). However, many other video games that use critical hits may have ways of increasing the likelihood of them occurring, such as by increasing the player character's level or attack statistic.

Both role-playing games and video games may also opt to use a less traditional version of critical hits, either by using different names, offering different effects than dealing more damage, including specific targets or weakpoint(s), and rarely by the inclusion of critical miss effects.

== Origin ==
Critical hits originate from the Reiswitzian Kriegsspiel, which they were added into shortly after the death of Georg von Reisswitz in 1827.

The 1975 role-playing game Empire of the Petal Throne introduced the concept of critical hits (though not the phrase) into role-playing. Using these rules, a player who rolls a result of 20 on a 20-sided die does double the normal damage, and a result of 20 followed by a result of 19 or 20 counts as a killing blow. According to creator M.A.R. Barker, "this simulates the 'lucky hit' on a vital organ."

== Types ==
Critical hits are meant to simulate an occasional "lucky hit". The concept represents the effect of hitting an artery, or finding a weak point, such as a stab merely in the leg causing less damage than a stab in the Achilles tendon. Critical hits are almost always random, although character attributes or situational modifiers may come into play. For example, games in which the player characters have a "Luck" attribute will often base the likelihood of critical hits occurring on this statistic: a character with high Luck will deal a higher percentage of critical hits, while a character with low Luck may, in some games, be struck by more critical hits. In the role-playing game Dungeons & Dragons, when a player character attacks an opponent the player typically rolls a 20-sided die; a roll of 20 (a 5% chance) results in a critical hit.

The most common kind of critical hit simply deals additional damage, most commonly dealing double the normal damage that would have been dealt, but many other formulas exist as well (such as ignoring defense of the target or always awarding the maximum possible damage). Critical hits also occasionally do "special damage" to represent the effects of specific wounds (for example, losing use of an arm or eye, or being reduced to a limp). Critical hits usually occur only with normal weapon attacks, not with magic or other special abilities, but this depends on the individual game's rules.

Many tabletop and video games use "ablative" hit point systems. That is, wounded characters often have no game differences from unwounded characters other than a reduction in hit points. Critical hits originally provided a way to simulate wounds to a specific part of the body. These systems usually use lookup charts and other mechanics to determine which wound was inflicted. In RPGs with non-humanoid characters or monsters, unlikely or bizarre results could occur, such as a Beholder with a "lost leg". Most systems now simply award extra damage on a critical hit, trading realism for ease of play. The effect of a critical hit is to break up the monotony of a battle with high, unusual results.

In the Brazilian RPG Tagmar, according to the result of a dice roll, the victim of a critical hit is significantly wounded or even instantly killed (regardless of hit points).

The roleplaying game Rolemaster is known for its extended system of criticals. One long-standing claim from its company ICE is that it is not the normal hits that kill, but the critical. By integrating criticals even on low results by varying the critical severity (from A (minor) - J (extreme)) and the large variety of criticals (e.g. Slash, Krush, Puncture, Heat, Cold, Electricity, Impact, Unarmed Strikes and even some bizarre ones such as Internal Disruption and Essence criticals), every combat plays out differently. Critical results vary from simple additional hits, and added bleeding and stuns to limbs lopped off and internal organs destroyed. Player characters are not immune to the effects of a critical hit in this system.

Many games call critical hits by other names. For example, in Chrono Trigger, a double hit is a normal attack in which a player character strikes an enemy twice in the same turn. The EarthBound series refers to critical hits as a smash hit (known in-game as "SMAAAASH!!"). The American NES release of Dragon Warrior II referred to an enemy's critical hits as "heroic attacks". In the Mario & Luigi subseries, critical hits are known as "lucky hits", whereas the word "critical" is instead used for attacks that are elementally effective (e.g. fire against plants). Players frequently use the abbreviation crit or critical for "critical hit".

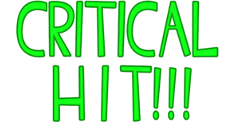
The text that appears above the player struck with a critical hit in Team Fortress 2

Team Fortress 2 uses a Critical and "Mini-Crit" system. Criticals deal three times the normal damage (and are not weaker at long range, unlike most damage), whereas "mini-crits" only increase damage by 35%. In addition to most weapons having a random chance to crit, some weapons have mechanics that guarantee them when used correctly, such as sniping weapons being capable of headshots (see below).

=== Critical miss ===
The negative counterpart of the critical hit is variously known as the critical miss, critical fumble, or critical failure. The concept is less frequently borrowed than that of critical hits. Many tabletop role-playing games use some variation on this concept (such as a "botch" in the Storyteller System), but few computer role-playing games implement critical misses except where the game is directly based on a tabletop game in which such rules appear. Video games are more likely to have a separate system for determining whether attacks miss, using mechanics such as accuracy and evasion.

=== Headshot ===
In shooter games, the concept of a critical hit is often substituted by the headshot, where a player attempts to place a shot on an opposed player or non-player character's head area or other weak spot, which is generally fatal, or otherwise devastating, when successfully placed. Headshots require considerable accuracy as players often have to compensate for target movement and a very specific area of the enemy's body. It is commonly used in first-person shooter video games such as Counter-Strike 2, Tactical Ops, and Unreal Tournament. In some games, even when the target is stationary, the player may have to compensate for movement generated by the telescopic sight.

The concept of head shots had been around in arcade light gun shooter electro-mechanical games since the late 1960s. In Sega's Duck Hunt, which began location testing in 1968 and released in January 1969, the player could shoot anywhere on the screen, including anywhere on the target's body. It awarded the player a higher score for a head shot, earning 15 points, whereas a standard body shot earned 10 points.

The earliest commercial first-person shooter video game to make use of headshots was GoldenEye 007 for the Nintendo 64; however, headshots and other location based damage for humanoid type creatures had earlier appeared in the original Team Fortress modification for Quake released the same year, although they were demonstrated and tested in a standalone TF Sniper "modification" created by the same team earlier that year.
