= Village Book 1 =

Tabletop role-playing game supplement

- Book Cover art for Village Book 1
- Author: Judges Guild
- Language: English
- Series: Village Books
- Genre: Fantasy, RPG
- Publisher: Judges Guild
- Publication place: United States of America
- Pages: 48
- Followed by: Village Book 2

Village Book 1 is a 1978 fantasy role-playing game supplement published by Judges Guild.

== Contents ==
Village Book 1 is a supplement which maps a layout of forty-eight small villages on hex paper.

== Publication history ==
According to Shannon Appelcline, Judges Guild began their publication of original material with a subscription format, but by 1978 "the line between subscription and non-subscriptions items would grow increasingly vague. Thus Judges Guild's innovative Village Book I (1978), which featured 48 village maps and various random tables for filling in those villages, appeared as part of Installment R (1978)." A listing of cumulative sales from 1981 shows that Village Book 1 sold over 25,000 units.

Different Worlds Publications later acquired and distributed Judges Guild products, including Village Book 1, Village Book 2, Castle Book I, and Castle Book II.

== Reception ==
Kurt Butterfield reviewed Village Book 1 in The Space Gamer No. 39. Butterfield commented that "If you're one of those judges who hates to spend a lot of time mapping and planning out a village, or if you often find yourself needing one on the spur of the moment, then this booklet is for you."

Patrick Amory reviewed Villages Book I for Different Worlds magazine and stated that "Since the GM is unlikely to have every village in his campaign mapped out in this detail. When a party happens upon a random village, all the GM has to do is flip through this booklet and select an appropriate one."

Ken Rolston reviewed the Different Worlds Publications version of Village Book 1 in The Dragon #133. Rolston commented that "[The] book contains the layouts of about 50 different villages, small towns, and castles, all drawn on hex sheets. There are no details for the functions or contents of the individual buildings, but it's nice to have the layouts when whipping up an adventure setting on short notice."
