= The Tomb Complex of Nereshánbo =

Fantasy tabletop role-playing game supplement

An adventure in the world of the MAN OF GOLD
- 1984 Cover
- Designers: Mark Pettigrew
- Publishers: Tékumel Games
- Publication: 1984; 42 years ago
- Genres: Science fantasy
- Systems: Swords and Glory

The Tomb Complex of Nereshánbo is a 1984 science fantasy tabletop role-playing game introductory Swords & Glory adventure set in the world of Tékumel, published by Tékumel Games.

== Contents ==
The Tomb Complex of Nereshánbo is an adventure in which the player characters discover the tomb complex of Nereshánbo hiVridame, a powerful Mriyan official of the Second Imperium of Tsolyanu whose death occurred under mysterious circumstances.

== History ==
Initially published in 1984 by Tékumel Games, it was republished in 1997 by Tita's House of Games.

== Reception ==
Frederick Paul Kiesche III reviewed The Tomb Complex of Nereshánbo in Space Gamer No. 71. Kiesche commented that "Tomb Complex overall is a good starting adventure for EPT/S&G."
