= Flamesong =

1985 science-fantasy novel by M. A. R. Barker

- Author: M. A. R. Barker
- Cover artist: Richard Hescox
- Language: English
- Series: Tékumel
- Genre: Science fantasy
- Publisher: DAW Superstar
- Publication date: September 1985
- Publication place: United States
- Media type: Print
- Pages: 412
- ISBN: 0-88677-076-9
- Preceded by: The Man of Gold
- Followed by: Prince of Skulls

Flamesong is a 1985 science-fantasy novel written by M. A. R. Barker and published by DAW Books. It is the second novel to take place on the fictional planet of Tékumel, also featured in Barker's role-playing game Empire of the Petal Throne (1974). The plot follows a group of far-future legionaries who discover an ancient "tubeway car" by accident and inadvertently use it to explore various exotic locales.

Flamesong is not a direct sequel to the first Tékumel novel The Man of Gold, as it features a different cast of characters. It also hints towards the beginning of a larger, more world-changing story arc. Unlike The Man of Gold, Flamesong was only published in the U.S. and no foreign-language editions followed. It has not been reprinted or published in digital format. As a consequence, Flamesong is somewhat difficult to find in the second-hand market and is more obscure than its predecessor.

As is the case with The Man of Gold, Flamesong features no separate description of the setting, although a short treatise on its fictional languages is subjoined. Also included are advertisements for the Tsolyáni dictionary and grammar and a role-playing source book detailing the setting. The novel attracted favorable reviews but was not commercially very successful.

Flamesong was the last collaboration between Barker and the DAW editor Donald A. Wollheim. Reportedly, they fell out after Barker urged Wollheim to take legal action against Raymond Feist, believing the latter's Riftwar series to be a plagiate of Tékumel. Barker also had a dispute with the role-playing game publisher TSR which claimed to be entitled to royalties from the Tékumel novels.

== Plot summary ==
Trinesh, a lieutenant in the Tsolyáni army, is eager to prove himself to his superiors, one of whom is the imperial prince Mirusíya. Mirusíya and his army worship the warlike fire deity Vimúhla, who once wielded a legendary weapon named Flamesong.

Trinesh' legionaries storm an isolated outpost occupied by the hostile empire of Yán Kór. The fastness is revealed to be an ancient temple that houses the access to a high-tech subway network. A group of Yán Kóryani noblewomen escape into one of the "tubeway cars". Trinesh and a handful of soldiers attempt to take the women as prisoners, but get trapped in the machine instead. The motley party begins an eventful journey from one tubeway station to another, each located in a distant and exotic land.

No one in the party knows exactly how to operate the tubeway car, and a lengthy series of misfortunes follows. Personal chemistries in the claustrophobic environment are strained at first, but over time the characters learn to understand each other despite their differing world-views and backgrounds. Eventually it is revealed that one of the Yán Kóryany noblewomen is Flamesong come into human flesh, and that her intent is to assassinate Mirusíya. She is nearly successful, but ultimately slays another, less important officer. Trinesh, on the other hand, sets free a group of extra-dimensional aliens enslaved by the Yán Kóryani ruler, thus seriously damaging his fancies of world domination.

Before parting ways, Trinesh and the Yán Kóryani noblewomen express their mutual respect. Trinesh himself declares his intent to become a general and pay a visit to his newfound Yán Kóryani friends, now as a conqueror.

== Reception ==
David Langford and Neal Tringham called Flamesong "an exotic travelogue" that is less successful than The Man of Gold, but interesting nonetheless. Langford and Tringham opined that Flamesong is better than the three Tékumel novels that followed it, and that Barker was more talented as a world-builder than he was as a novelist.

In Issue 36 of Abyss, Eric Olson found the book rather ponderous and pointed out that the meaning of the book's title did not become clear until the final 60 pages. Although Olson found the book "is built around an interesting premise, and the portions of the book that deal with this premise are good, I had a feeling that a great portion of the book was filler." Olson concluded, "I would give Flamesong a qualified recommendation ... some of the ideas are very interesting."

A retrospective review posted on the genre fiction blog Pornokitsch described the novel as more consistent and better balanced than The Man of Gold. Regardless, the reviewer felt that the plot consists mainly of "railroaded events" driven by "a magical place-hopping, plot-forwarding tube." The review concluded that, despite its obvious shortcomings, the novel is "action-packed" and "a lot of fun", successfully inviting the reader to learn more about Tékumel.

A website dedicated to Tékumel collecting described the novel as the best written of the series. The reviewer felt that, while the "dynamics among the soldiers" are sometimes implausible, the characterization is generally good and the novel has a better structured plot than its predecessor. The reviewer concluded that Flamesong may also function as a "gold mine of information" for Tékumel fans.

Writing for the Black Gate website, John O'Neill described the novel as "an even more ambitious sequel [that] was highly acclaimed… but only by those few who read it."

== Other reviews and commentary ==
- Fantasy Review (November 1985): Review by Lynn F. Williams
