= Village Book 2 =

Role-playing game supplement

- The cover for Village Book 2
- Author: Bryan Hinnen, Mark Holmer, Mitch Johnson
- Genre: Role-playing game
- Publisher: Judges Guild
- Publication date: 1979
- Media type: Print
- Pages: ≈50

Village Book 2 is a supplement for fantasy role-playing games published by Judges Guild in 1979.

== Contents ==
Village Book 2 is a supplement for gamemasters containing 50 village maps useable for plotting wilderness encounters or preparing a campaign, and also presents tables that can be used to randomly generate both heraldry and coats of arms.

== Publication history ==
Village Book 2 was written by Bryan Hinnen, Mark Holmer, and Mitch Johnson, with Bob Bledsaw, and a cover by Jennell Jaquays (Note: Credited as Paul Jaquays.), and was published by Judges Guild in 1979 as a 64-page book.

Different Worlds Publications later acquired and distributed Judges Guild game products, including Village Book 1, Village Book 2, Castle Book I, and Castle Book II.

== Reception ==
Patrick Amory reviewed Villages Book II for Different Worlds magazine and stated that "In the front are some what confusing but well researched and fairly accurate rules on generating heraldic coats of arms, shields, and devices."

Ken Rolston reviewed the Different Worlds Publications version of Village Book 1 in The Dragon #133. Rolston commented that "[The] book contains the layouts of about 50 different villages, small towns, and castles, all drawn on hex sheets. There are no details for the functions or contents of the individual buildings, but it's nice to have the layouts when whipping up an adventure setting on short notice."

== Reviews ==
- Different Worlds #6 (Dec 1979)
