= Qadardalikoi =

Fantasy tabletop wargame

Miniatures Campaigns on the World of Tékumel
- Box cover by Kathy Marschall
- Designers: Jeff Berry; M. A. R. Barker
- Publishers: Tékumel Games; Tita's House of Games
- Publication: 1983; 42 years ago
- Genres: Fantasy miniatures wargame

Qadardalikoi is a fantasy miniatures wargame published by Tékumel Games in 1983.

== Gameplay ==
Qadardalikoi is a game which involves the Armies of the Five Empires, as well the armies of the other non-human races, and presents tactical and strategic information. The rules are much more detailed than the two earlier Tekumel miniature rules sets: Legions of the Petal Throne and Missum!.

== History ==
Originally published by Tékumel Games in 1983, and republished it in 1984. It was later republished by Tita's House of Games in 1998.

== Reception ==
Frederick Paul Kiesche III reviewed Qadardalikoi in Space Gamer No. 71. Kiesche commented that "Qadardalikoi is [...] a mixed blessing to EPT RPGers. Most of the information pertains to miniatures, and will most likely be useless. However, there is much useful stuff for those who are willing to work a little."

== See also ==
- The Armies of Tékumel, six army supplements for Tékumel miniatures wargaming, 1978-1998
- EPT Miniatures, a 1983 set of miniatures for Tékumel wargaming
