= EPT Miniatures =

Line of Tékumel miniatures

EPT Miniatures is a range of Tékumel miniatures produced by Tékumel Games in 1983.

== Contents ==
With figures by sculptors Bill Murray, Tom Myer, Jeff Barry, and Brian Apple, EPT Miniatures was a full line of miniatures, including military figures representing the Tsolyani, Yan Koryani and Mu'Uglavyani, as well as some friendly and unfriendly nonhumans, other creatures, and more.

== History ==
cover of Miniatures from MAR Barker's World of Tékumel

EPT Miniatures is one many miniatures series produced for Tekumel wargaming, for use with the three rules sets available; Legions of the Petal Throne (1975), Missúm! (1978), and Qadardalikoi, 1983. A supporting set of army lists, The Armies of Tékumel were produced 1978-1998, and a painting guide, Miniatures from MAR Barker's World of Tékumel in 1982.

== Reception ==
Frederick Paul Kiesche III reviewed EPT Miniatures in Space Gamer No. 71. Kiesche commented that "Tekumel lends itself to beautiful miniatures, what with the elaborate costumes worn by the priests and priestesses and the detailed armor worn by the military. It is nice to see that Tekumel Games has been able to carry this beauty into the miniatures."

== See also ==
- Legions of the Petal Throne, a 1975 Tékumel miniatures wargame
- Qadardalikoi, a 1983 Tékumel miniatures wargame
- The Armies of Tékumel, six army supplements for Tékumel miniatures wargaming, 1978-1998
