= Swords & Glory, Volume 1: Tékumel Source Book =

1983 fantasy role-playing game supplement published by Gamescience for Swords & Glory

The World of the Petal Throne
- Designers: M. A. R. Barker
- Publishers: Gamescience; Different Worlds
- Publication: 1983; 43 years ago
- Genres: Fantasy

Swords & Glory, Volume 1: Tékumel Source Book is a 1983 fantasy tabletop role-playing game published by Gamescience set in M. A. R. Barker's science fantasy world of Tékumel. It was republished by Different Worlds in 1987.

== Contents ==
Swords & Glory, Volume 1: Tékumel Source Book is the first part of the three releases that form the rules for Sword & Glory, and presents a campaign world for characters to adventure in.

== Reception ==
In the November–December 1984 edition of Space Gamer (Issue No. 71), Frederick Paul Kiesche III and Steve Sherman commented that "If you have any interest at all in Tekumel; if you've been running EPT using the old game system; if you want to start a Tekumel campaign; or if you like strange worlds and wondrous societies, this is your book."

In the January–February 1985 edition of Different Worlds (Issue #38), John Dark noted that his review probably was superfluous, since "If you are a Tekumel junkie (as I am), you will buy the Swords & Glory material no matter what I say. If you are not a Tekumel fan, you are unlikely to purchase it, especially at the stiff price you will need to shell out." Dark did criticize the "dense, unrelieved, small print" typesetting, with the unprofessional addition of accents added by hand. He also did not like the lack of an index or table of contents, saying, "It is rather difficult to find a desired subject in the book, and the very nature of the book demands browsing." He concluded with a negative recommendation, saying, "Swords & Glory is a classic example of wasted potential. Based on one of the greatest fantasy worlds ever dreamed up, but shackled by truly horrendous rules, it is an anomaly. I'll still buy all the Tekumel stuff I can get my hands on — the charm of Tekumel enthralls me still. But I cannot recommend any non-fanatic purchase these lengthy, incomplete rules."

== Other reviews ==
- Game News #10 (Dec., 1985)

== See also ==
- Swords & Glory, Volume 2: Tékumel Player's Handbook
