= Castle Book I =

1978 fantasy role-playing game supplement

- Castle Book I's book cover.
- Author: Bob Bledsaw
- Series: Castle Books
- Genre: Fantasy, RPG
- Publisher: Judges Guild
- Publication date: 1978
- Publication place: United States of America
- ISBN: 9780000000132
- Followed by: Castle Book I

Castle Book I is a 1978 fantasy role-playing game supplement published by Judges Guild.

== Contents ==
Castle Book I is a supplement which presents fifty castles laid out in a variety of shapes and sizes.

== Publication history ==
According to Shannon Appelcline, Judges Guild began their publication of original material with a subscription format, but by 1978 "the line between subscription and non-subscriptions items would grow increasingly vague" but that "their Castle Book I (1978), which had 50 castle maps, couldn't be found among the subscription packets at all. From here on, the subscription installments represented some of the Judges Guild books for those months." A listing of cumulative sales from 1981 shows that Castle Book I sold over 15,000 units.

Different Worlds Publications later acquired and distributed Judges Guild products, including Village Book 1, Village Book 2, Castle Book I, and Castle Book II.

== Reception ==
In the May 1981 edition of The Space Gamer (No. 39), Kurt Butterfield commented that "The Castle Book has many interesting ideas in it. For the price, it's a bargain."

Patrick Amory reviewed Castles Book I for Different Worlds magazine and stated that "Some are a little outlandish, but who cares? This is fantasy! Again, its usefulness lies in the fact that the GM will almost certainly not have all the castles in his campaign mapped out in this detail."

In the May 1988 edition of Dragon (Issue #133), Ken Rolston said, "There are no details for the functions or contents of the individual buildings, but it’s nice to have the layouts when whipping up an adventure setting on short notice."
