= The Book of Ebon Bindings =

Role-playing game supplement

The Book of Ebon Bindings is a 1978 fantasy role-playing game supplement written by M. A. R. Barker.

== Contents ==
The Book of Ebon Bindings is a supplement of demonology for the world of Tekumel, presenting information on known demons.

== Publication history ==
The Book of Ebon Bindings was published again by Theatre of the Mind Enterprises in 1991.

== Reception ==
Frederick Paul Kiesche III reviewed The Book of Ebon Bindings in Space Gamer No. 71. Kiesche commented that "This book is another fascinating facet of the EPT/S&G game universe, and one well worth exploring if you're not faint of heart!"

Wayne Ligon reviewed The Book of Ebon Bindings in White Wolf #34 (Jan./Feb., 1993), rating it a 4 out of 5 and stated that "Anyone who is involved in a Tékumel campaign [...] should pick up this book and treat oneself to another glimpse into one of the most detailed gaming settings ever envisioned."
