= A Jakállan Intrigue =

A Jakállan Intrigue is a 1984 fantasy role-playing game adventure published by Tékumel Games for Empire of the Petal Throne and Swords & Glory.

== Contents ==
A Jakállan Intrigue is an adventure in which the player characters work with several non-player characters to perform functions such as guards and assistants in the city of Jakalla.

== Reception ==
Frederick Paul Kiesche III reviewed A Jakállan Intrigue in Space Gamer No. 71. Kiesche commented that "Intrigue is an excellent adventure, far superior to much of what is currently on the market. A fine new product from Tekumel Games, indicating that we have real talent working there!"
