= The Art of Tactical Sorcery =

The Art of Tactical Sorcery is a 1986 role-playing game supplement published by Tékumel Games for Swords & Glory.

== Contents ==
The Art of Tactical Sorcery is a supplement in which the strategic deployment of magic within the military frameworks of Tékumel is explored. The book was designed to be compatible with both the Empire of the Petal Throne and Swords & Glory systems.

== Publication history ==
The Art of Tactical Sorcery was written by John E. Tiehen and published by Tékumel Games in 1986 as a 24-page book.
