= The Northwest Frontier =

The Northwest Frontier is a 1981 role-playing game supplement published by Adventure Games.

== Contents ==
The Northwest Frontier is a supplement in which a collection of campaign maps depicts the Northwest Frontier region of the Tsolyáni Empire within the world of Tékumel. Detailed descriptions of the individual locations are provided separately in the companion volume, Gazetteer for the Northwest Frontier Map Set.

== Publication history ==
Northwest Frontier Maps was written by Craig Smith and published by Adventure Games Inc in 1979 as six maps and a cover sheet. A second edition was published in 1981, saying it was the second print on the cover sheet.
