= Adventures on Tekumel =

Adventures on Tekumel is a set of 1992 role-playing adventures for Empire of the Petal Throne published by Theatre of the Mind Enterprises.

== Plot summary ==
Adventures on Tekumel Part One is an adventure in which a lifepath provides a method of character creation. Adventures on Tekumel, Part 2, Vol 1 is an adventure in which a series of solo adventures presents the world of Tékumel.

== Reception ==
Wayne Ligon Part One: Growing up on Tékumel in White Wolf #34 (Jan./Feb., 1993), rating it a 4 out of 5 and stated that it "is a very valuable aid to EPT gaming, and anyone interested in the system should pick it up."

He also reviewed Part Two/Volume One: Coming Of Age In Tékumel in White Wolf #35 (March/April, 1993), rating it a 3 out of 5 and stated that "The book is strictly geared to the world and milieu of Tékumel: very little of it is useful as a sourcebook for another game. It is a godsend to players of Empire of the Petal Throne, though, since very few adventure scenarios have ever been available for this game."

== Reviews ==
- The Eye of All-Seeing Wonder (Issue 1 - Autumn 1992)
