= Deeds of the Ever-Glorious =

Tabletop role-playing game supplement

Deeds of the Ever-Glorious is a 1978 fantasy role-playing game supplement.

== Contents ==
Deeds of the Ever-Glorious is a supplement which provides historical outlines for 85 legions that serve in the Empire of Tsolyanu.

== Reception ==
Frederick Paul Kiesche III reviewed Deeds of the Ever-Glorious in Space Gamer No. 71. Kiesche commented that "Deeds is an excellent supplement for those involved with EPT/S&G. Much of the history given can be used in campaigns on Tekumel, to embellish adventures, fill in backgrounds, etc. Highly recommended."
