= Castle Paths =

Castle Paths is a 1981 role-playing game supplement published by Board-Craft Simulations.

== Contents ==
Castle Paths is a supplement in which a playing aid consists of twelve colorful castle and outdoor tiles designed to interlock like puzzle pieces, allowing players to create varied terrain layouts. Alongside the tiles, it provides character counters, a brief set of instructions explaining how to use the components, the Basic Role-Playing rules, and a short introductory adventure scenario.

== Publication history ==
Castle Paths was published by Board-Craft Simulations in 1981 as a boxed set containing 12 cardboard tiles, a 16-page booklet, a 4-page booklet, a 2-page booklet, and counters.

Shannon Appelcline noted how Tadashi Ehara had been acquiring gaming publications from various companies in the mid 1980s and founded Different Worlds Publications to hold these acquisitions: "Ehara even continued with his purchasing spree when he picked up Boardcraft Simulation's gaming accessories: Fantasy Paths (1981), Castle Paths (1981), and Village Paths (1981) — three boxes of geomorphic map tiles. Ironically, they each came packaged with Chaosium's BRP rules. It's likely this purchase came about due to the companies knowing each other, as Boardcraft had been located in nearby Martinez, California."

== Reviews ==
- Sorcerer's Apprentice #16
