= Swords & Glory, Volume 2: Tékumel Player's Handbook =

Tabletop role-playing game supplement

Adventures in Tékumel
- Publishers: Gamescience
- Publication: 1983; 43 years ago
- Genres: Fantasy
- Systems: Basic Role-Playing

Swords & Glory, Volume 2: Tékumel Player's Handbook is a 1983 fantasy tabletop role-playing game supplement published by Gamescience set in M. A. R. Barker's science fantasy world of Tékumel.

== Contents ==
Swords & Glory, Volume 2: Tékumel Player's Handbook is the second part of the three releases that form the rules for Sword & Glory, and provides players with the rules to create characters.

== Reception ==
In the November–December 1984 edition of Space Gamer (Issue No. 71), Frederick Paul Kiesche III and Steve Sherman commented that "The game system described in this tightly-packed, 240 page rulebook can best be described as realistic and complex. It is not suitable for the occasional player, but, rather, for those who take their roleplaying seriously. The author's respect for his audience is clear."

In the January–February 1985 edition of Different Worlds (Issue #38), John Dark was not impressed with the unprofessional typesetting, calling it "pages of dense, unrelieved, small print", noting in addition that "all the accent marks were done by hand." Dark also noted the disorganization of subject matter, commenting "It is rather difficult to find a desired subject in this book, and the very nature of the book demands browsing, so it cannot be said to fulfill its function very well." He found that the rules were "quite complicated and not particularly realistic." He concluded by giving the book a poor rating of 1.5 out of 5, saying, "Swords & Glory is a classic example of wasted potential. Based on one of the greatest fantasy worlds ever dreamed up, but shackled by truly horrendous rules, it is an anomaly. [...] I cannot recommend any nonfanatic purchase these lengthy, incomplete rules."

In the May 1989 edition of Games International, Paul Mason admitted a personal bias with regards to the use of Dungeons & Dragons rules, saying "it does little to enhance the appeal of a world as rich and sophisticated as Tékumel." However, since these books do not have any role-playing rules, only campaign background, Mason found that there was "plenty to dip into." He concluded by giving this set of books an above-average rating of 4 out of 5, saying, "In a market full of hack fantasy and ersatz subcreation, it's reassuring to come across something which bears the stamp of true imagination."

== Reviews ==
- Game News #10 (Dec., 1985)

== See also ==
- Swords & Glory, Volume 1: Tékumel Source Book
