= Fantasy Paths =

Fantasy Paths is a 1981 role-playing game supplement published by Board-Craft Simulations.

== Contents ==
Fantasy Paths is a supplement in which a playing aid consists of twenty‑eight double‑sided tiles illustrated in color with rooms, corridors, stairways, and other dungeon features. Designed to interlock like puzzle pieces, the tiles allow players to create a variety of dungeon layouts. Alongside the tiles, it provides character counters, a brief set of instructions explaining how to use the components, the Basic Role-Playing rules, and a short introductory adventure scenario.

== Publication history ==
Fantasy Paths was published by Board-Craft Simulations in 1981 as a boxed set containing 28 cardboard tiles, a 16-page booklet, a 4-page booklet, a 2-page booklet, and counters.

Shannon Appelcline noted how Tadashi Ehara had been acquiring gaming publications from various companies in the mid 1980s and founded Different Worlds Publications to hold these acquisitions: "Ehara even continued with his purchasing spree when he picked up Boardcraft Simulation's gaming accessories: Fantasy Paths (1981), Castle Paths (1981), and Village Paths (1981) — three boxes of geomorphic map tiles. Ironically, they each came packaged with Chaosium's BRP rules. It's likely this purchase came about due to the companies knowing each other, as Boardcraft had been located in nearby Martinez, California."

== Reviews ==
- Sorcerer's Apprentice #16
