= War of the Wizards =

War of the Wizards may refer to:

- War of the Wizards, a 1977–1981 novel trilogy by Richard K. Lyon and Andrew J. Offutt, consisting of Demon in the Mirror (1977), The Eyes of Sarsis (1980) and Web of the Spider (1981)
- War of the Wizards (gamebook), a 1986 gamebook by Ian Page
- War of the Wizards (album), a 1992 album by Stormwitch

== See also ==
- War of the Wizards, the American alternate release title for Wu zi tian shi, a. k. a. The Phoenix, a 1978 Taiwanese fantasy adventure film featuring Richard Kiel
- War of Wizards, a 1975 fantasy tabletop wargame published by TSR
- War Wizards, the working title of the 1977 Ralph Bakshi film Wizards
- Warzard, a portmanteau of "War" and "Wizard", the Japanese alternative title of the 1996 Capcom fighting arcade game Red Earth
