= Gazetteer for the Northwest Frontier Map Set =

Gazetteer for the Northwest Frontier Map Set is a 1986 role-playing game supplement published by Tékumel Games.

== Contents ==
Gazetteer for the Northwest Frontier Map Set is a supplement in which a detailed campaign setting based on the Northwest Frontier region of the Tsolyáni Empire and its neighboring states seen in The Northwest Frontier map set is offered.

== Publication history ==
The Gazetteer of the Northwest Frontier Map Set was written by Thomas Thompson and M. A. R. Barker and published by Tékumel Games in 1986 as a 28-page book.
