= The Man of Gold =

The Man of Gold may refer to:

- Man of Gold (film), a 1919 Hungarian silent film
- The Man of Gold (film), a 1962 Hungarian film
- The Man of Gold (novel), Tékumel novel by M. A. R. Barker
- Bangaarada Manushya (lit. 'Man of Gold'), a 1972 Indian Kannada-language film starring Dr. Rajkumar
  - Dr. Rajkumar (1929–2006), Indian actor and singer, known as "Bangaarada Manushya"
