= Johnny Reb (game) =

1983 miniatures wargame by Adventure Games

Johnny Reb is a miniatures wargame first published by Adventure Games in 1983.

== Description ==
Johnny Reb is a miniatures wargame rules set for regimental level American Civil War miniature gaming.

== Publication history ==
Johnny Reb was first published by Adventure Games in 1983. The game was designed by John Hill. Game Designers' Workshop published a second edition in 1988. Hill founded and owned the Johnny Reb Game Company, which published the third version, Johnny Reb III rules in 1996.

A loyal fan community of the game, The Johnny Reb Gaming Society published CHARGE! quarterly magazine, wholly devoted to the game, from 2003 to 2013.

== Reception ==
Dana Lombardy comments: "John Hill's Civil War miniatures rules remain innovative, challenging, and lots of fun, a claim supported by the game's loyal fan support. Clubs still stage Johnny Reb sessions at conventions around the world, more than 20 years after the rules were introduced."

Johnny Reb was awarded the H.G. Wells Award for "Best Miniatures Rules of 1983".

== Reviews ==
- Fire & Movement #39
- Fire & Movement #40
