= Georg von Reisswitz =

Wargaming pioneer

Georg Heinrich Rudolf Johann von Reisswitz
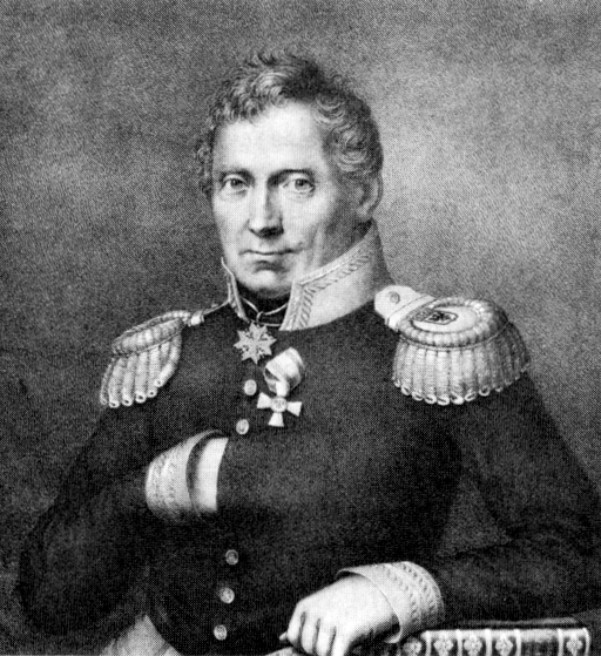
- Born: 1794
- Died: 1 September 1827 (aged 32–33) Breslau, Silesia, Kingdom of Prussia
- Allegiance: Kingdom of Prussia
- Branch: Prussian Army
- Service years: 1810 - 1827
- Rank: Captain
- Conflicts: Napoleonic Wars; War of the Sixth Coalition; Siege of Glogau
- Awards: Iron Cross 2nd Class; Order of St John

Georg Heinrich Rudolf Johann von Reisswitz (Note: Sources disagree on the correct spelling of Reisswitz's family name. An 1812 rulebook by his father spells its author's name as "Reiswitz". His own 1824 rulebook spells it "Reisswitz". Articles that appear in various issues of Militär-Wochenblatt spell it "Reißwitz". In the German language, ß is a ligature of "ss" and is so transliterated into English.) (1794–1827) was a Prussian army officer. Reisswitz is regarded by many as the father of wargaming, as he developed the first wargaming system to be widely used as a serious tool for training and research. The particular genre of wargaming he developed is known in the English-speaking world as Kriegsspiel. It is characterized by high realism, an emphasis on the experience of decision-making rather than on competition, and the use of an umpire to keep the system flexible.

== Life and career ==
Reisswitz's father was George Leopold von Reisswitz, a Prussian baron.

In 1810, Reisswitz was a volunteer in an artillery unit in Neisse. In late 1813, during the Siege of Glogow, (Note: 1 Sept 1813 - 10 April 1814) Reisswitz was promoted to second-lieutenant and awarded the Iron Cross 2nd Class. By 1819, he was a first-lieutenant in the Guard Artillery Brigade in Berlin.

Reisswitz was a skilled fencer and a skilled violinist.

=== The wargame designer ===
In 1812, Reisswitz's father developed a wargaming apparatus which he presented as a gift to the Prussian king, which the royal family embraced and regularly played. The father hoped that wargaming would eventually become a regular tool of instruction and training for army officers, but he never perfected the system, probably because of the upheavals caused by the Napoleonic Wars. By 1816, Reisswitz's father seemed to have lost interest in wargaming altogether, and his son decided to continue the development of the game.

Reisswitz steadily developed his father's game with the help of his fellow junior officers. His project caught the attention of Prince Wilhelm, who joined Reisswitz's gaming circle. In 1824, the prince invited Reisswitz to demonstrate his wargame to the king and his chief of staff, General Karl Freiherr von Müffling. They were all impressed and officially endorsed Reisswitz's game as a training tool for the army. Reisswitz established a workshop to mass-produce and distribute his game.

The king awarded Reisswitz the Order of St John as a reward. Reisswitz frequently hosted wargaming sessions for senior officers, and once for the Russian court.

=== Late career and death ===
In 1826, Reisswitz was promoted to the rank of captain and transferred from Berlin to the provincial city of Torgau. This posting was interpreted as a banishment from the Prussian court. Allegedly, Reisswitz had made offensive remarks about his superiors. According to an 1874 article by Reisswitz's friend and fellow officer Heinrich Ernst Dannhauer, there were people in the Prussian court who were jealous of the attention and honors that this junior officer was attracting from the elite circles, and they sabotaged him by misreporting innocent remarks as insults. Reisswitz fell into depression, and on 1 September 1827, he shot himself. Reisswitz's father died a year later, and they were buried in the same cemetery.

Reisswitz's disgrace and suicide hampered the progression of his wargame for obvious reasons, but it was kept alive by a small number of wargaming clubs, and in later decades it was widely played by the officer corps. Reisswitz's name was rarely mentioned, however, in subsequent literature on kriegsspiel. In 1874, his old friend and fellow officer Heinrich Ernst Dannhauer, now a general, rehabilitated Reisswitz's name in an article published in Militär-Wochenblatt #56.

== Reisswitz's wargame ==
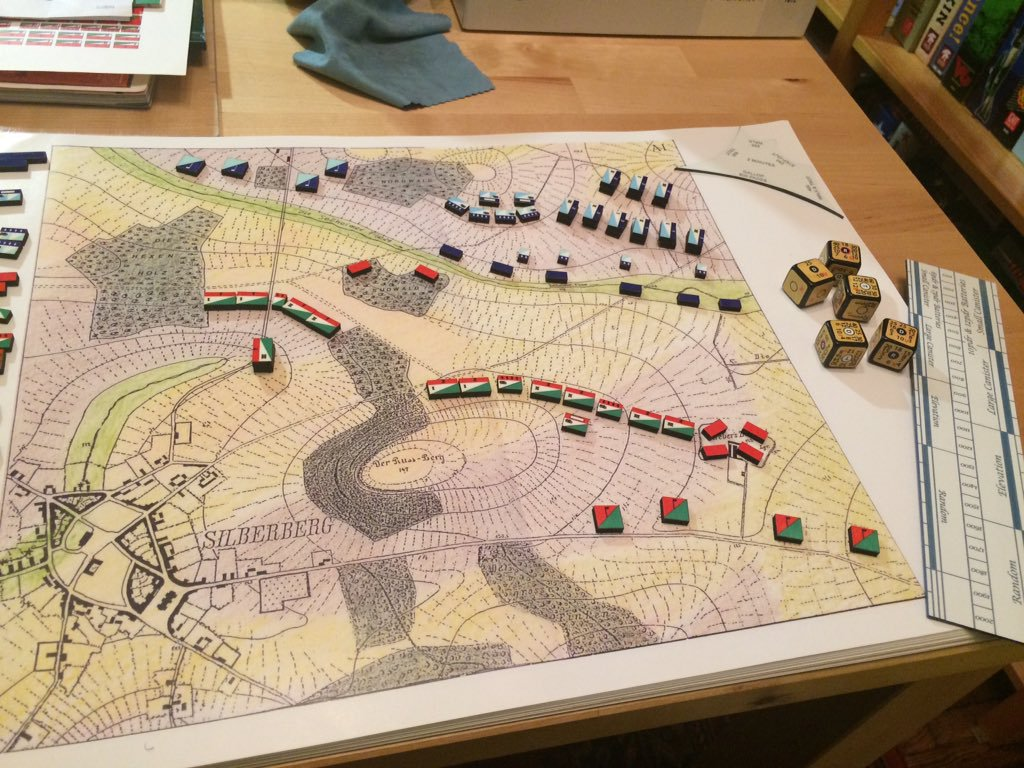
A reconstruction of the wargame developed in 1824 by Reisswitz Jr.

Reisswitz invented professional wargaming. Kriegsspiel was the first wargaming system that was embraced as a serious tool for training and research by an army. Previous wargames were dismissed as mere toys because they were not realistic enough. Reisswitz took advantage of new advances in cartography and probability theory to create a battle simulator that was sufficiently realistic for instructional use. Reisswitz did not like calling his system a "game", but he could not find a better term for it.

Reisswitz's wargame was designed to simulate battles at the tactical level (it did not concern itself with operational matters such as training and logistics). It was played on a paper map which represented the battlefield, and the troops were represented by little blocks of lead placed on the game map. The game was played by two teams, each commanding an imaginary army of little lead blocks, and was overseen by an umpire. The game was turn-based. Each turn, a team would give written orders for their troops to the umpire, who would then move the little blocks across the game map according to how he judged the imaginary troops would interpret and execute the orders. Each turn represented two minutes of time, and during a turn the troops would do only as much as they realistically could in two minutes. Reisswitz's manual provided tables denoting exactly how far the troops could move in two minutes, according to the type of troop and the terrain they crossed (cavalry moved faster than infantry, marching uphill was slower than downhill, etc.). When the two armies engaged each other, the umpire would use dice rolls and simple arithmetic to compute how many casualties they inflicted upon each other, and when a troop formation was defeated he would remove its block from the game map.
