= War of Wizards =

Fantasy tabletop wargame

The Game Of Fantastic Magical Combat
- Box cover
- Designers: M. A. R. Barker
- Publishers: TSR 1975; Tita's House of Games 1999
- Publication: 1975; 50 years ago
- Genres: Fantasy board wargame

War of Wizards is a board game published by TSR in 1975. It was TSR's first publication for M. A. R. Barker's world of Tékumel.

== Development ==
David M. Ewalt, in his book Of Dice and Men, described how University of Minnesota professor M. A. R. Barker "made his game-design debut at TSR. A scholar of ancient languages, Barker had spent decades crafting a fantasy world called Tékumel, writing thousands of pages of histories, describing its culture, and even constructing its languages. He served as adviser to the university's wargaming club, and after Michael Mornard showed him Dungeons & Dragons, Barker wrote two games based in Tékumel; a tabletop role-playing game, Empire of the Petal Throne; and a combat-oriented board game, War of Wizards."

== History ==
Originally published by TSR in 1975, it was reprinted by Tita's House of Games in 1999. War of Wizards predates TSR releasing Empire of the Petal Throne by a few months, making it their first Tékumel publication.

== Gameplay ==
War of Wizards could be used to enhance the combat rules in fantasy role-playing games.

== Reception ==
Colin Wheeler reviewed War of Wizards for White Dwarf #8, and stated that "All in all, War of Wizards is an enjoyable game and can be played in a good evening session."
