= Adventure Games =

American game company

Adventure Games was an American game company that produced role-playing games and game supplements.

== History ==
In the early 1980s Dave Arneson established his own game company, Adventure Games – staffed largely by Arneson's friends, most of whom were also members of a Civil War reenactment group – that produced miniatures games, as well as a new edition of his own Adventures in Fantasy role-playing game (1981). The company also put out about a half-dozen Tékumel related books, due to Arneson's friendship with M. A. R. Barker. Adventure Games was profitable, but Arneson found the workload to be excessive and finally sold the company to Flying Buffalo. Flying Buffalo picked up the rights to Adventure Games in 1985; because Arneson owned a portion of Flying Buffalo, he let them take care of the rest of the company's stock and IP when he shut the company down.

== Games ==
- The Armies of Tékumel Volumes I-II (1978-1981)
- Harpoon (1981)
- Rails Through the Rockies (1981)
- The Complete Brigadier (1982)
- Harpoon II (1983)
- Johnny Reb (1983)
- Pentantastar (1983)
