= The Armies of Tékumel =

Fantasy tabletop wargame supplement

- Cover of Volume I: Tsolyánu, 2nd Printing 1981
- Designers: M. A. R. Barker
- Publishers: The Tekumel Journal; Adventure Games; Tita's House of Games
- Publication: 1978; 47 years ago
- Genres: Fantasy miniatures wargame

The Armies of Tékumel is a series of miniatures wargame army supplements, written by M. A. R. Barker for the fantasy world of Tékumel, designed to be used with the Qadardalikoi miniatures rules for Empire of the Petal Throne, and published between 1978 and 1983, with the original five volumes reprinted in 1997 with an additional sixth published in 1998.

== History ==
The six volumes are:

- The Armies of Tékumel, Volume I: Tsolyánu, M. A. R. Barker, published 1978, 1981, 1997.
- The Armies of Tékumel, Volume II: Yan Kor and Allies, M. A. R. Barker, 1981, 1997.
- The Armies of Tékumel, Volume III: Mu'ugalavyá, M. A. R. Barker, 1983, 1997.
- The Armies of Tékumel, Volume IV: Salarvya, M. A. R. Barker, 1983, 1997.
- The Armies of Tékumel, Volume V: Livyanu and Tsolei, M. A. R. Barker, 1983, 1997.
- The Armies of Tékumel, Volume VI: Shenyu, M. A. R. Barker & Robert Brynildson, 1998.

== Reception ==
Frederick Paul Kiesche III reviewed The Armies of Tékumel in Space Gamer No. 71. Kiesche commented that "This can be a useful item if you're willing to dig out the information for RPG scenarios. Otherwise, you can probably skip it and your campaign will be just as exciting. Definitely a 'look before buying' item."

== See also ==
- Legions of the Petal Throne, a 1975 Tékumel miniatures wargame
- Qadardalikoi, a 1983 Tékumel miniatures wargame
