= Adventures on Tekumel, Part 2, Vol 2 =

Adventures on Tekumel, Part 2, Vol 2 is a 1992 role-playing adventure for Empire of the Petal Throne published by Theater of the Mind Enterprises.

== Plot summary ==
Adventures on Tekumel, Part 2, Vol 2 is an adventure in which four adventures are included for play by a solitary player character.

== Reception ==
Jim Comer reviewed Adventures on Tekumel, Pt. 2, Vol. 2: Beyond the Borders in White Wolf #40 (1994), rating it a 3 out of 5 and stated that "These adventures are fun, but it's too easy to get killed, wasting a character that took a long time to create. This is not a roleplaying game. It lacks many things, especially a combat system. Campaign play is impossible. Though this is an impressive product, it has little use, like a Lamborghini without a motor: looks good, but I want to go somewhere."
