= Pentantastar =

Board game

- Designers: David R. Megarry; Alexandra Megarry; Kit Megarry
- Publishers: Adventure Games; Flying Buffalo
- Publication: 1983; 43 years ago
- Genres: Fantasy games; Wargames
- Players: 2–4
- Playing time: 120 minutes
- Age range: 12+

Pentantastar is a fantasy wargame published by Adventure Games in 1983. Players fight on opposing sides of a battle for power between two rulers, engaging in militaristic combat as they vie for territory, all the while searching for a magical weapon called the Pentantastar.

== Publication history ==
Pentantastar was published in 1983 by Adventure Games, and was their last game before the company was acquired by Flying Buffalo (FBI) in 1985. FBI continued to sell the remaining stock purchased from Adventure Games, even sending free copies of the game to former subscribers following the cancellation of their gaming magazine Sorcerer's Apprentice, according to an account by Ken St. Andre.

== Gameplay ==
Players take on the roles of either King Farin of Vanzar in the East (yellow), who commands an army of eagles, elves, and dwarves, or Lord Arkhon of the West (red), who commands an army of rolls, wyverns, and snakes, as they fight for control of the land represented by a paper map. While the military conflict ensues, both sides send out Quest pieces–Farin's wizards and Arkhon's wolf–who move and search different locations for the five scattered charms that make up a magical city-destroying weapon called the Pentantastar. This means that there are two possible means a player can win; each side has a set of locations their forces must occupy in order to win by military victory, and a magical victory can be achieved by transporting all pieces of the Pentantastar to the opposing side's capital city. In a four-player game, the military and magical aspects of each side are divided between two players and victory is shared by the players on a side.

Each side begins with an equal number of troops, represented by small colored pieces of cardboard, which have varying strengths and movement capabilities. On their turn, a player move any number of these pieces. Any troops adjacent to opposing forces enter into combat and cause the defender's pieces to retreat if the attacker's strength is greater than theirs. Certain pieces, spaces, and cards give Magical Points (MP) and the player with the greater amount of MP moves and searches with their Quest pieces on their turn, in addition to their military action. Cards are also drawn each round, which can be played for either MP or a military function (to mobilize more troops or introduce hazards which negatively influence the board in some way).

== Reception ==
Writing for Games, Matthew Costello wrote that "from its delicately shaded map-board to its intriguing rules of play, Pentantastar stands out as a fantasy adventure game of uncommon beauty and intelligence", positively referencing the flowchart's ease of use and the "fast and strategically demanding" gameplay. Games also featured Pentantastar in their 1984 Games 100.
