= The Tékumel Bestiary =

The Tékumel Bestiary is a 1992 role-playing supplement for Empire of the Petal Throne published by Theater of the Mind Enterprises.

== Contents ==
The Tékumel Bestiary is a supplement in which creatures are presented by type of terrain they inhabit.

== Reception ==
Wayne Ligon reviewed The Tékumel Bestiary in White Wolf #35 (March/April, 1993), rating it a 3 out of 5 and stated that "All in all, the Tékumel Bestiary serves as a needed reference work for the Tékumel gamer, and can also be used as a sourcebook by anyone looking for something beyond Elf/Dwarf/Troll/Goblin."
