= The Man of Gold (novel) =

Novel

- Cover of the first edition
- Author: M. A. R. Barker
- Cover artist: Michael Whelan
- Language: English
- Series: Tékumel
- Genre: Science fantasy
- Publisher: DAW Superstar
- Publication date: 1984
- Publication place: United States
- Media type: Print
- Pages: 367
- ISBN: 0-87997-940-2
- Followed by: Flamesong

The Man of Gold is a 1984 science-fantasy novel written by M. A. R. Barker and published by DAW Books. It is the first novel set on the fictional world of Tékumel – also featured in Barker's role-playing game Empire of the Petal Throne (1974) – and tells the story of a priest of Thúmis named Hársan, a scholar who becomes involved in the quest for the eponymous artifact of a past immensely ancient.

Barker became acquainted with DAW editor Donald A. Wollheim through their shared interest in miniatures. The Man of Gold was licensed to the London publisher Century Hutchinson, which released a UK edition in 1985. The novel was also translated into German and published under the title Der Ungewöhnliche Goldmann: Abenteuer in Tekumel by Goldmann Verlag in 1986.

The DAW edition contains no separate description of the setting, but a short treatise on its fictional languages and their pronunciation is subjoined. Also included are advertisements for the Tsolyáni language and grammar as well as for a source book describing the setting in detail.

The novel was generally well-received, with one contemporary reviewer favorably comparing Barker to the likes of Clark Ashton Smith and Jack Vance. The novel was praised for its setting, intrigue and the atmosphere of ancientness, although its plotting and characterization have been criticized as weak. Its commercial performance was less impressive. According to one source, The Man of Gold had a print run of 15,000, about half of which failed to sell.

The Man of Gold was republished as an e-book by the Tékumel Foundation in 2015. A print-on-demand version soon followed. The first edition cover art by Michael Whelan, while deemed gorgeous by the Foundation, was scrapped in favor of a new design as the original had little to do with the actual story. The new edition also includes illustrations and maps by Giovanna Fregni, who also designed the cover.

== Plot summary ==
Priestling Hársan has grown up among the non-human Pé Chói and is regarded a clanless bastard. He lives in a monastic community with other priests of Thúmis, a god of knowledge, and specializes in esoteric languages. Hársan is summoned by the high adept of the temple of Thúmis to the capital to investigate recently discovered relics that hold a relationship to the ′Weapon Without Answer′ — a high-tech device of old, utilized by the hostile empire of Yán Kór.

Hársan is thrown into a quest to recover the Man of Gold before it is too late, pulled across much of Tsolyánu as he follows various leads and evades the machinations of aliens and rival factions within the Tékumel. During his travels, Hársan manages to charm two young ladies of considerable beauty and wildly incompatible personalities. Ultimately, the Man of Gold is discovered and the Yán Kóryani designs of conquest are averted for the time being.

A pariah no more, Hársan is accepted into the Tsolyáni high society and awarded acceptance into a clan of his choosing for his feats. The story closes as he contemplates marriage to his sweethearts and whether the two of them will ever learn to tolerate each other.

== Analysis ==
The character of Hársan resembles Barker in some ways as both are professional linguists. Like Harsan, Barker may have suffered from isolation as a youth, being the only child of a family that moved repeatedly.

== Reception ==
Frederick Paul Kiesche III reviewed The Man of Gold in Space Gamer No. 71. Kiesche commented that "I say 'bravo' to Professor Barker and impatiently await the next Tékumel novel, Flamesong. If you love the fantastic fiction of A. Merritt, Clark Ashton Smith, or Jack Vance, you will find a new love in The Man of Gold. An excellent first novel and another fascinating facet of one man's universe – the Empire of the Petal Throne."

David R. Dunham reviewed The Man of Gold for Different Worlds magazine and stated that "I recommend The Man of Gold to anyone interested in different cultures in general, in Tékumel in particular (it's much more accessible than the Source Book, which has perhaps too much information and no index), and in an entertaining book. It's a book you can read again, both to discover more about the cultures, and to understand more about the reasons for what happens."

The Encyclopedia of Science Fiction entry written by David Langford and Neal Tringham describes the novel as Barker's most successful; "a bildungsroman full of political intrigue and mysterious artefacts" that unfortunately suffers from "a somewhat disjointed plot." Tringham and Langford opine that Barker was more talented as a world-builder than he was as a prosaist. A website dedicated to Tékumel collecting comments that the pacing issues reflect Barker's inexperience as a novelist.

A retrospective review, originally published on RPGnet in 1999, awarded the novel high points for substance but less so for style, criticizing its clichéd, clumsily constructed narrative, MacGuffin-driven action, and unsatisfying finale. Another source of criticism is a scene where a female character is tortured in a bizarre and highly sexualized manner. Nonetheless, the setting with its political machinations and remnants of ancient civilizations is "beyond compare", making The Man of Gold a worthy read.

Another retrospective review, posted on the genre fiction blog Pornokitsch, describes The Man of Gold as "a curiously unadventurous adventure", noting Hársan's "naive but reckless" personality and his tendency to drift from one encounter to another without conscious agency. While the story and its characters are bland, the world of Tékumel is awe-inspiring. Rather than "a stand-alone piece of entertainment," The Man of Gold should be approached "as a part of an educational process," offering an accessible introduction to Barker's fictional universe and inviting the reader to dream Tékumelani adventures of his or her own.

Writing for the Black Gate website, John O'Neill described The Man of Gold and its sequels as "a series of well-received fantasy novels." He also lauded Whelan's cover art as marvelous.

== Reviews ==
- Review by Bill Collins (1984) in Fantasy Review, December 1984
- Review by Tom Easton (1985) in Analog Science Fiction/Science Fact, February 1985
