= Tsolyáni language =

Constructed language of a fantasy setting

Tsolyáni
- Tsolyáni
- Created by: M. A. R. Barker
- Purpose: Constructed language: Khíshan (fictional); Tsolyáni

Language codes
- ISO 639-3: None (mis)
- Glottolog: None
- IETF: art-x-tsolyani

Tsolyáni is one of several languages invented by M. A. R. Barker, developed in the mid-to-late 1940s in parallel with his legendarium leading to the world of Tékumel as described in the Empire of the Petal Throne roleplaying game, published by TSR in 1975. It is detailed in The Tsolyáni Language, Part I and II.

It was the first constructed language ever published as part of a role-playing game and draws its inspiration from Urdu, Pashto, Mayan and Nahuatl. The last influence can be seen in the inclusion of the sounds hl [ɬ] and tl [tɬ]. One exact borrowing from a real-world source is the Tsolyáni noun root sákbe, referring to the fortified highways of the Five Empires; it is the same word as the Yucatec Maya sacbe, referring to the raised paved roads constructed by the pre-Columbian Maya. Another close borrowing is from the Nahuatl word tlatoani, referring to a leader of an Aztec state (e.g. Montezuma); it is similar to the clan-name of the Tsolyáni emperors, Tlakotáni.

== Alphabet ==
Tsolyáni is written in an offshoot of the Engsvanyáli script which was developed by Barker in parallel with the language, being very close to its modern-day form by 1950. It is read from right-to-left and is constructed like the Arabic script. The consonants each have 4 different forms: isolate, initial, medial, and final; the 6 vowels and 3 diphthongs each only have an independent initial form, while diacritical marks are used for medial and final vowels.

Each letter in the Tsolyáni Engsvanyáli script now has a name—each consonant is surrounded by a coordinating vowel: labials in u-u, dentals in a-a, apicals in i-i, laminals in e-e, velars in o-o-, and the remaining (uvulars, glottals, ... etc.) in ü-ü:

In IPA	Letter Name	Final	Medial	Initial	Isolate	IPA	Translit	In IPA	Letter Name	Final	Medial	Initial	Isolate	IPA	Translit
/o·ko/	oko					/k/	k	/u·pu/	upu					/p/	p
/o·ɡo/	ogo					/ɡ/	g	/u·bu/	ubu					/b/	b
/o·xo/	okho					/x/	kh	/u·mu/	umu					/m/	m
/o·ɣo/	ogho					/ɣ/	gh	/u·fu/	ufu					/f/	f
/y·qy/	üqü					/q/	q	/u·vu/	uvu					/v/	v
/y·hy/	ühü					/h/	h	/u·wu/	uwu					/w/	w
/o·ŋo/	ongo					/ŋ/	ng	/a·t̪a/	ata					/t̪/	t
/y·ʔy·hy/	üꞌühü					/ʔ/	ꞌ	/a·d̪a/	ada					/d̪/	d
/i·tsi/	itsi					/ts/	ts	/a·n̪a/	ana					/n̪/	n
/i·ɬi/	itli					/ɬ/	tl	/a·θa/	atha					/θ/	th
/i·si/	isi					/s/	s	/a·ða/	adha					/ð/	dh
/i·ʃi/	ishi					/ʃ/	sh	/e·tʃe/	eche					/tʃ/	ch
/i·zi/	izi					/z/	z	/e·dʒe/	eje					/dʒ/	j
/i·ʒi/	izhi					/ʒ/	zh	/eʰ·je/	ehye					/j/	y
/e·ʂe/	esse					/ʂ/	ss	/a·l̪a/	ala					/l̪/	l
/a·r̪a/	ara					/r̪/	r	/i·ƚi/	ihli					/ƚ/	hl
								/y·ɭy/	üllü					/ɭ/	ll

The vowels have their names echoing in n-n, while ü (/y/ or /ɯ/) and the diphthongs echo in m-ꞌ. These have only an isolate/initial independent letter, and are denoted by marks when falling medially or finally within a word or name:

In IPA	Vowel Name	Vowel Sign	Vowel Letter	IPA	Translit	In IPA	Vowel Name	Vowel Sign	Vowel Letter	IPA	Translit
/nu·nu/	nunu			/u/	u	/ni·ni/	nini			/i/	i
/my·my/	mümü			/y/~/ɯ/	ü	/na·naʰ/	nanah			/a/	a
/ne·neʰ/	neneh			/e/	e	/no·noʰ/	nonoh			/o/	o
/moɪ·ʔoɪ/	moiꞌoi			/oɪ/	oi	/maʊ·ʔaʊ/	mauꞌau			/aʊ/	au
						/maɪ·ʔaɪ/	maiꞌai			/aɪ/	ai

Here are the numeral symbols the Tsolyáni use:

In IPA	Name	Numeral	Numerical Value	In IPA	Name	Numeral	Numerical Value	In IPA	Name	Numeral	Numerical Value
/ˈɬe/	tlé		10	/ˈɬo/	tló		5				0
/m̹ˈriˌkta/	mríkta		100	/ˈɡa·ˌbi/	gábi		6	/ˈpru/	prú		1
/ˌtaʊ·ˈknel/	tauknél		1,000	/h̹ˈru/	hrú		7	/ˈɡa/	gá		2
/ˈɬe·ˌtaʊ·ˈknel/	tlétauknél		10,000	/ˈɡa·ˌmi/	gámi		8	/ˈbi/	bí		3
/m̹ˈri·ˌkta·ˌtaʊ·ˈknel/	mríktatauknél		100,000	/ˌpru·ˈɬe/	prutlé		9	/m̹ˈri/	mrí		4
/jyr·dyn/	yürdün		1,000,000								

The punctuation signs used in Tsolyáni include:

!	?	.	,	" ' ' "	-	; :

== Phonology ==
Tsolyáni has an unusual sound system, with elements blended from Arabic, Urdu, Pashto, and Mayan.

CONSONANTS
		Labial	Dental	Alveolar		Post-alveolar	Retroflex	Palatal	Velar	Uvular	Glottal
		Labial	Dental	median	lateral	Post-alveolar	Retroflex	Palatal	Velar	Uvular	Glottal
Plosives	voiceless	p ⟨p⟩		t ⟨t⟩					k ⟨k⟩	q ⟨q⟩	ʔ ⟨’⟩
Plosives	voiced	b ⟨b⟩		d ⟨d⟩					ɡ ⟨g⟩		
Affricates	voiceless	(ps ⟨ps⟩)		ts ⟨ts⟩	tɬ ⟨tl⟩	tʃ ⟨ch⟩			(ks ⟨ks⟩)		
Affricates	voiced	(bz ⟨bz⟩)		(dz ⟨dz⟩)	(dɬ ⟨dl⟩)	dʒ ⟨j⟩			(ɡz ⟨gz⟩)		
Fricatives	voiceless	f ⟨f⟩	θ ⟨th⟩	s ⟨s⟩	ɬ ⟨hl⟩	ʃ ⟨sh⟩	ʂ ⟨ss⟩		x ⟨kh⟩		h ⟨h⟩
Fricatives	voiced	v ⟨v⟩	ð ⟨dh⟩	z ⟨z⟩		ʒ ⟨zh⟩			ɣ ⟨gh⟩		
Nasals		m ⟨m⟩		n ⟨n⟩					ŋ ⟨ng⟩		
Rhotics	tap			ɾ ⟨r⟩							
Rhotics	trill			r ⟨rr⟩							
Approximants		w ⟨w⟩			l ⟨l⟩			j ⟨y⟩			

VOWELS
	Front		Central		Back	
	unrounded	rounded	unrounded	rounded	unrounded	rounded
High	i ⟨i⟩	y ~ ɯ ⟨ü⟩				u ⟨u⟩
Mid	e ⟨e⟩	ø ~ ɤ ⟨ö⟩	ə ~ ɜ ⟨ë⟩			o ⟨o⟩
Low			a ⟨a⟩			ɔ ~ ɒ ⟨å⟩

Diphthongs used by Tsolyáni: ai /aɪ/, oi /oɪ/, au /aʊ/; those in use in related conlangs include: ea /eɑ/, ia /ɪɑ/, eo /eɔ/.

== Related conlangs ==
Tsolyáni was the only Tékumeláni language that had a full grammar book, dictionary, pronunciation tapes (now on CD) and a primer, all publicly released. Yet it was not the only language Barker developed for his imaginary world. He also wrote grammar guides and partial vocabularies for several other languages he developed for it: Yán Koryáni, Livyáni, Engsvanyáli and Sunúz. In the world of Tékumel, the first two are the languages of the modern nations of Yán Kór and Livyánu, respectively. Engsvanyáli is a dead language, an ancestor of Tsolyáni and many other modern Tékumeláni languages; knowledge of it is considered prestigious, and it is used in literary, liturgical, sorcerous, and scholarly contexts. Sunúz is an obscure language, used for sorcerous purposes; it contains terms to describe movement in a supposed six-dimensional multi-planar space, something of use to the fictional beings who visit the other planar realms where demons live.

Barker also wrote articles on the scripts for other languages of Tékumel.

The Yán Koryáni Block Script

CONSONANTS

/p/	/b/	/t̪/	/d̪/	/k/	/ɡ/	/ʔ/	/f/	/v/	/s/	/z/	/θ/	/ð/	/ʷ/
p	b	t	d	k	g	ꞌ	f	v	s	z	th	dh	-w
pu	bu	ta	da	ko	go	'ishta	fu	vu	si	zi	tha	dha	labializer
/ʃ/	/ʒ/	/ʂ/	/x/	/ɣ/	/q/	/h/	/m/	/n/	/ɲ/	/ɳ/	/ŋ/	/w/	/ʲ/
sh	zh	ss	kh	gh	q	h	m	n	ñy	nn	ng	w	-y
shi	zhi	ehsse	kho	gho	qü	hü	mu	na	nye	nnü	ngo	wu	palatalizer
/j/	/r̪/	/l̪/	/ɬ/	/ɭ/	/c/~/tʃ/	/ɟ/~/dʒ/	/ts/	/dz/	/tɬ/	/dɮ/			/ˀ/
y	r	l	hl	ll	ch	j	ts	dz	tl	dl			-ꞌ
ye	ra	la	hli	llü	che	je	tsi	dzi	tli	dli			glottalizer
								The labialization sign may be used with most of the consonants (outside of: ꞌ, ss, ñy, w, and y).					
/pʷ/	/bʷ/	/t̪ʷ/	/d̪ʷ/	/kʷ/	/ɡʷ/	/qʷ/	/hʷ/	The labialization sign may be used with most of the consonants (outside of: ꞌ, ss, ñy, w, and y).					
pw	bw	tw	dw	kw	gw	qw	hw	The labialization sign may be used with most of the consonants (outside of: ꞌ, ss, ñy, w, and y).					
								The palatalization sign may also be used with most consonants (outside of: ꞌ, ss, ñy, w, and y).					
/pʲ/	/bʲ/	/t̪ʲ/	/d̪ʲ/	/kʲ/	/ɡʲ/	/l̪ʲ/	/r̪ʲ/	The palatalization sign may also be used with most consonants (outside of: ꞌ, ss, ñy, w, and y).					
py	by	ty	dy	ky	gy	ly	ry	The palatalization sign may also be used with most consonants (outside of: ꞌ, ss, ñy, w, and y).					
										The glottalization sign is usually employed on the tenue and affricate letters; it is occasionally seen elsewhere.			
/pˀ/	/bˀ/	/t̪ˀ/	/d̪ˀ/	/kˀ/	/ɡˀ/	/qˀ/	/cˀ/~/tʃˀ/	/tsˀ/	/tɬ/	The glottalization sign is usually employed on the tenue and affricate letters; it is occasionally seen elsewhere.			
pꞌ	bꞌ	tꞌ	dꞌ	kꞌ	gꞌ	qꞌ	chꞌ	tsꞌ	tƚꞌ	The glottalization sign is usually employed on the tenue and affricate letters; it is occasionally seen elsewhere.			
										The labialization with glottalization signs may both be employed on the tenue and affricate letters.			
/pʷˀ/	/bʷˀ/	/t̪ʷˀ/	/d̪ʷˀ/	/kʷˀ/	/ɡʷˀ/	/qʷˀ/	/cʷˀ/~/tʃʷˀ/	/tsʷˀ/	/tɬʷˀ/	The labialization with glottalization signs may both be employed on the tenue and affricate letters.			
pwꞌ	bwꞌ	twꞌ	dwꞌ	kwꞌ	gwꞌ	qwꞌ	chwꞌ	tswꞌ	tƚꞌ	The labialization with glottalization signs may both be employed on the tenue and affricate letters.			
										The palatalization with glottalization signs may both also be used on the tenue and affricate letters.			
/pʲˀ/	/bʲˀ/	/t̪ʲˀ/	/d̪ʲˀ/	/kʲˀ/	/ɡʲˀ/	/qʲˀ/	/cʲˀ/~/tʃʲˀ/	/tsʲˀ/	/tɬʲˀ/	The palatalization with glottalization signs may both also be used on the tenue and affricate letters.			
pyꞌ	byꞌ	tyꞌ	dyꞌ	kyꞌ	gyꞌ	qyꞌ	chyꞌ	tsyꞌ	tƚyꞌ	The palatalization with glottalization signs may both also be used on the tenue and affricate letters.			

VOWELS AND DIPHTHONGS

The vowels are named an, en, in, on, un, üm, ëm, öm, äm, and åm; the diphthongs have the names of aum, aim, eam, oim, iam, and eom.

/a/	/e/	/i/	/o/	/u/	/y/	/ə/	/ø/	/æ/	/ɔ/
a	e	i	o	u	ü	ë	ö	ä	å
/aː/	/eː/	/iː/	/oː/	/uː/	/yː/	/əː/	/øː/	/æː/	/ɔː/
ā	ē	ī	ō	ū	ǖ	ë̄	ȫ	ǟ	å̄
/ã/	/ẽ/	/ĩ/	/õ/	/ũ/	/ỹ/	/ə̃/	/ø̃/	/æ̃/	/ɔ̃/
ã	ẽ	ĩ	õ	ũ	ü̃	ë̃	ö̃	ä̃	å̃
/aʊ/	/aɪ/	/ea/	/oɪ/	/ɪa/	/eo/				
au	ai	ea	oi	ia	eo				

The Sunúz Epilapidary Script

In IPA	Letter Name	Letter	IPA	Translit	In IPA	Letter Name	Letter	IPA	Translit
/ko·l̪a·r̪a/	kolara		/k/	k	/pu·l̪a·r̪a/	pulara		/p/	p
/ɡo·l̪a·r̪a/	golara		/ɡ/	g	/bu·l̪a·r̪a/	bulara		/b/	b
/xo·l̪a·r̪a/	kholara		/x/	kh	/mu·l̪a·r̪a/	mulara		/m/	m
/ɣo·l̪a·r̪a/	gholara		/ɣ/	gh	/fu·l̪a·r̪a/	fulara		/f/	f
/qy·l̪a·r̪a/	qülara		/q/	q	/vu·l̪a·r̪a/	vulara		/v/	v
/hy·l̪a·r̪a/	hülara		/h/	h	/wu·l̪a·r̪a/	wulara		/w/	w
/ŋo·l̪a·r̪a/	ngolara		/ŋ/	ng	/t̪a·l̪a·r̪a/	talara		/t̪/	t
/ʔiʃ·t̪a·ne·qu/	ꞌishtanequ		/ʔ/	ꞌ	/d̪a·l̪a·r̪a/	dalara		/d̪/	d
/e·tsi·l̪a·r̪a/	etsilara		/ts/	ts	/n̪a·l̪a·r̪a/	nalara		/n̪/	n
/e·ɬi·l̪a·r̪a/	etlilara		/ɬ/	tl	/θa·l̪a·r̪a/	thalara		/θ/	th
/e·si·l̪a·r̪a/	esilara		/s/	s	/ða·l̪a·r̪a/	dhalara		/ð/	dh
/e·ʃi·l̪a·r̪a/	eshilara		/ʃ/	sh	/e·tʃe·l̪a·r̪a/	echelara		/tʃ/	ch
/e·zi·l̪a·r̪a/	ezilara		/z/	z	/e·dʒe·l̪a·r̪a/	ejelara		/dʒ/	j
/e·ʒi·l̪a·r̪a/	ezhilara		/ʒ/	zh	/je·l̪a·r̪a/	yelara		/j/	y
/e·ʂe·l̪a·r̪a/	esselara		/ʂ/	ss	/l̪a·l̪a·r̪a/	lalara		/l̪/	l
/r̪a·l̪a·r̪a/	ralara		/r̪/	r	/e·ƚi·l̪a·r̪a/	ehlilara		/ƚ/	hl
					/e·ɭy·l̪a·r̪a/	ellülara		/ɭ/	ll
/u·nu·xa·mu/	unukhamu		/u/	u	/i·ni·xa·mu/	inikhamu		/i/	i
/y·my·xa·mu/	ümükhamu		/y/~/ɯ/	ü	/a·na·xa·mu/	anakhamu		/a/	a
/e·ne·xa·mu/	enekhamu		/e/	e	/o·no·xa·mu/	onokhamu		/o/	o
/oɪ·moɪ·xa·mu/	oimoikhamu		/oɪ/	oi	/aʊ·maʊ·xa·mu/	aumaukhamu		/aʊ/	au
					/aɪ·maɪ·xa·mu/	aimaikhamu		/aɪ/	ai
0	1	2	3	4	5	6	7	8	9
.									
