= Kriegsspiel =

19th-century Prussian wargame

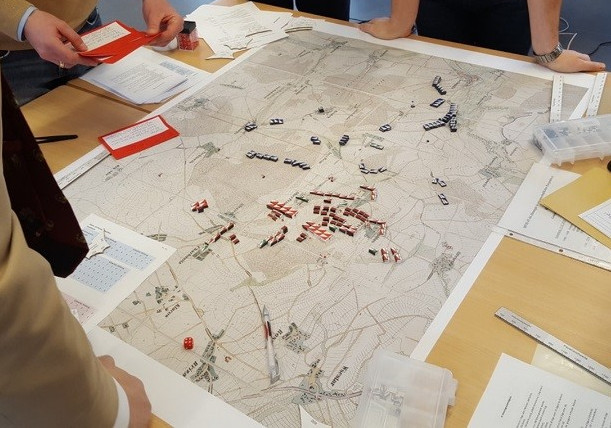
A Kriegsspiel session in progress.

Kriegsspiel (Note: German: [ˈkʁiːksˌʃpiːl] "kreegs-shpeel") is a genre of wargaming developed by the Prussian Army in the 19th century to teach battlefield tactics to officers. The word Kriegsspiel literally means "wargame" in German, but in the context of the English language it refers specifically to the wargames developed by the Prussian army in the 19th century. Kriegsspiel was the first wargaming system to have been adopted by a military organization as a serious tool for training and research.

It is characterized by high realism, an emphasis on the experience of decision-making rather than on competition, and the use of an umpire to keep the rules flexible and manage hidden information. After Prussia's impressive victory over France in the Franco-Prussian War, other countries began designing similar wargames for their own armies.

Most forms of Kriegsspiel involve at least two teams of players and one umpire gathered around a map. The map represents a battlefield. Each team is given command of an imaginary army which is represented on the map using small blocks, often painted. Each block represents some kind of troop formation, such as an artillery battery or a cavalry squadron. The players command their troops by writing their orders on paper and giving them to the umpire. The umpire will then read these orders and move the blocks across the map according to how they judge the imaginary troops would interpret and execute their orders. The outcomes of combat are determined either by simple mathematical calculations or the umpire's judgment.

== History ==
=== Precursors ===
By definition, a "wargame" is a strategy game that attempts to realistically represent warfare. The earliest wargames were invented in the German states around the turn of the 19th century. They were derivatives of chess, but the pieces represented real military units, cavalry, infantry, artillery, etc. and the squares were color-coded to represent different types of terrain.

These early wargames were not realistic enough to satisfy the military. The pieces were constrained to move across a grid in chess-like fashion: only a single piece could occupy a square, even if that square represented, say, a square mile, and the pieces had to move square by square. This, of course, did not represent how real troops maneuvered in the field. The grid system also forced the terrain to take unnatural forms, such as rivers flowing in straight lines and right angles.

=== Reisswitz Sr.'s prototype (1812) ===
In response to these criticisms, a Prussian nobleman and wargaming enthusiast named George Leopold von Reisswitz set out to develop a more realistic wargame wherein the units could move about in a free-form manner over more natural terrain.

Reisswitz first experimented with a table covered in a layer of damp sand. He sculpted the sand into a three-dimensional model battlefield, with hills and valleys. He used little wooden blocks to represent troop formations. The Prussian princes heard about Reisswitz's project and asked for a demonstration. He showed it to them in 1811, and they enthusiastically recommended the game to their father, King Frederick Wilhelm III.

Reisswitz did not want to present the king a table of damp sand, so he set about constructing a more impressive apparatus. In 1812, Reisswitz presented to the king a wooden table-cabinet. The cabinet's drawers stored all the materials to play the game. The cabinet came with a folding board which, when unfolded and placed on top of the cabinet, provided a gaming surface about six feet by six feet in size. Instead of sculpted sand, the battlefield was made out of porcelain tiles, upon which terrain features were depicted in painted bas-relief. The tiles were modular and could be arranged on the table surface to create a custom battlefield. The scale was 1:2373. Troop formations were represented by little porcelain blocks. The blocks could be moved across the battlefield in a free-form manner; dividers and rulers were used to regulate movement.

The royal family was delighted by Reisswitz's game, and frequently played it. However, it was not adopted by army instructors nor sold commercially. The apparatus that Reisswitz made for the king was too expensive for mass-production. Additionally, his system was not complete and required some improvisation on the part of the players. For instance, the rules for resolving the effects of hand-to-hand combat and terrain advantage were not fully worked out. Reisswitz may have been too distracted by the upheavals of the Napoleonic Wars to perfect his game. By 1816, Reisswitz seemed to have lost interest in wargaming altogether. The development of the wargame was continued by his son, Georg Heinrich Rudolf Johann von Reisswitz.

=== Reisswitz Jr. perfects Kriegsspiel (1824) ===
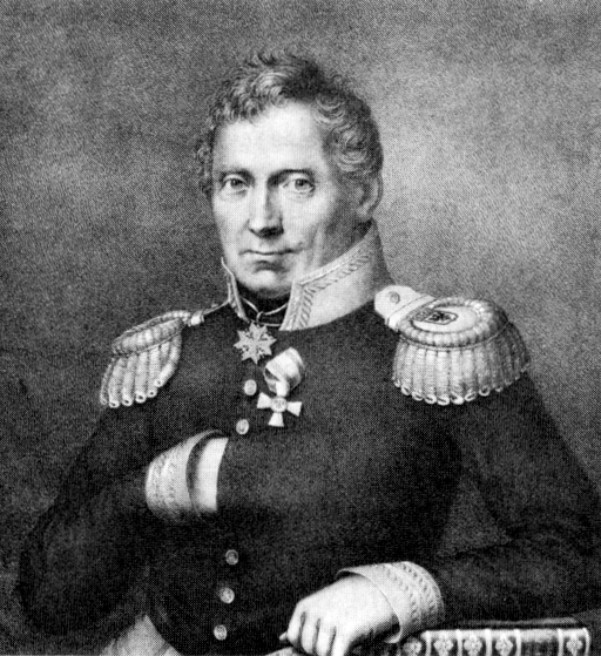
Georg von Reisswitz (the son)

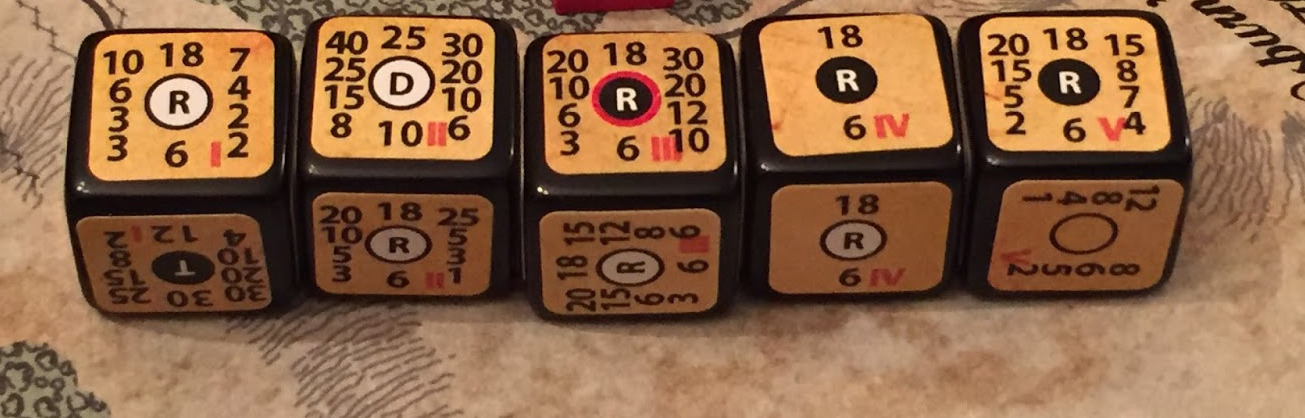
Dice for the 1824 edition of Kriegsspiel

Georg Heinrich Rudolf Johann von Reisswitz was a junior officer in the Prussian army. He took over the development of his father's wargame after his father lost interest in it. He developed the game with the help of a circle of junior officers in Berlin. The prince eventually heard of Reisswitz Jr.'s project and, having fond memories of playing Reisswitz Sr.'s wargame, joined the son's gaming circle.

In the earlier wargames of Hellwig and Venturini, units were like chess pieces in that when attacked, they were simply killed and removed from play, even if the pieces represented groups of soldiers. By contrast, units in Reisswitz's game could suffer partial losses yet still remain on the battlefield. A unit might withstand several rounds' worth of enemy attacks before finally collapsing. Reisswitz's game was thus the first to incorporate unit hitpoints. It also modeled variable damage: The casualties inflicted by an attacker on his enemy were determined using dice.

Reisswitz Jr.'s game was designed to be played on accurate, large-scale (1:8,000) topographical maps. The Prussian army had recently begun using such maps, which were the product of new advances in cartography and printing. These maps may have not been available to Reisswitz Sr. and previous wargame designers, but they were available by the 1820s and Reisswitz Jr. took advantage of them. Using topographical maps allowed for more natural terrain and the play of battles in real locations.

Reisswitz Jr.'s great innovation, however, was the introduction of an umpire. The players did not directly control the troop blocks on the game map. Rather, they wrote down their orders for their troops and gave them to the umpire. The umpire would then move the blocks across the game map according to how they judged the imaginary troops would interpret and carry out the players' orders. When the troops engaged the enemy on the map, it was umpire who rolled the dice, computed the effects, and removed slain units from the map.

The game could simulate the fog of war, where the umpire would place on the map blocks only for the troops which were in visual range of both sides. The umpire kept a mental track of where the hidden troops were located, and only deployed blocks for them when they came into view of the enemy. The umpire arbitrated situations which the rules did not explicitly cover, which plugged any gaps in Reisswitz Jr.'s system. This required the umpire to be an impartial and experienced officer.

In early 1824, the prince invited Reisswitz Jr. to present his wargame to the king and his senior generals at Berlin Castle. They were impressed and officially endorsed his game as a training tool for the officer corps. The Chief of the General Staff, General von Müffling declared: "this is no ordinary sort of game, this is schooling for war. I must and will recommend it most warmly to the army." The king ordered that every regiment receive a Kriegsspiel set. Reisswitz established a workshop by which he could mass-produce and distribute it. He sold the game's material in a box-set priced at 30 thalers. 30 thalers in 1824 had an equivalent purchasing power of €1,704 in 2025 (US$2,020). This was thus the first wargame to be widely adopted by a military as a serious tool for training and research.

=== Kriegsspiel after Reisswitz Jr.'s death ===
In 1826, Reisswitz was transferred away from Berlin to the provincial city of Torgau. This was interpreted as a banishment: allegedly, he had made offensive remarks about his superiors. He committed suicide in 1827. This disgrace was detrimental to the progression of his wargame for obvious reasons. It wasn't until 1860 that the game was widely played in the military. Until then, it survived thanks to the efforts of a small number of wargaming clubs. The earliest of these clubs was the Berlin Wargame Association. (Note: Berliner Kriegsspiel-Verein)

Another prominent club was the Magdeburg Club, managed by General von Moltke. These clubs continued to develop Reisswitz's game, but they avoided mentioning his name in their publications. In 1828, the Berlin Wargame Association published a limited expansion to Reisswitz's system. In 1846, they released a fresh wargaming manual which received a second edition in 1855. These updates sought to make Kriegsspiel more realistic, but they also made the rules more complicated.

Wilhelm von Tschischwitz published a Kriegsspiel manual in 1862 that incorporated new technological advances such as railroads, telegraph, and breech-loading cannons; and which used conventional gaming dice. It also greatly simplified the rules, making the wargame even simpler than Reisswitz's original version. Tschischwitz's rules went through three editions between 1862 and 1869. In 1869, Colonel Thilo von Trotha published his own wargaming treatise which went through three editions and had more complicated rules.

The Austro-Prussian War of 1866 and the Franco-Prussian War of 1870 broke a long period of peace for the German states, which made many officers feel a pressing need to better familiarize themselves with the conduct of war. This led to a surge in interest in Kriegsspiel among Prussian officers.

=== The free Kriegsspiel movement ===
Lieutenant Wilhelm Jacob Meckel published a treatise in 1873 (Note: Studien über das Kriegsspiel ("Study of Wargames")) and another in 1875 (Note: Anleitung zum Kriegsspiel ("Instructions for Wargaming")) in which he expressed four complaints about the overcomplicated rules of Kriegsspiel: 1) the rules constrain the umpire, preventing them from applying their expertise; 2) the rules are too rigid to realistically model all possible outcomes in a battle, because the real world is complex and ever-changing; 3) the computations for casualties slow down the game and have a minor impact on a player's decisions anyway; 4) few officers are willing to make the effort to learn the rules.

The fourth issue was the most serious, as the Prussian military struggled to meet the growing demand for umpires. Meckel proposed dispensing with some of the rules and giving the umpire more discretion to arbitrate events as they saw fit. The only things he kept were the dice and the losses tables for assessing casualties.

In 1876, General Julius von Verdy du Vernois proposed dispensing with all the rules and tools completely and allowing the umpire to arbitrate the game entirely as he saw fit. This form of Kriegsspiel came to be known as free Kriegsspiel (counterpart to Reisswitz's rigid Kriegsspiel) and was well-received by the officer corps because it was easier to learn and allowed umpires to apply their own expertise. Verdy's insight was that all that was truly essential for Kriegsspiel was the umpire and concealed information, with an emphasis on the fog of war and delayed messaging. Free Kriegsspiel became popular and Reisswitz's rigid style fell out of favor in professional circles.

=== Spread of wargaming beyond Germany ===
Kriegsspiel attracted little attention outside of Prussia before 1870. Reisswitz Jr. travelled to Russia where he demonstrated Kriegsspiel to the Russian court, but he failed to win them over. In 1825, the French general Auguste de Marmont witnessed a Kriegsspiel match in Berlin and commissioned a translation of Reisswitz's manual which was submitted to the French army in March 1829. A Dutch translation appeared in 1836.

In 1870, Prussia defeated France in the Franco-Prussian War. Many credited the Prussian army's superior performance to its wargaming tradition. The Prussian army did not have any significant advantage in weaponry, numbers, or troop quality, but it was the only army in the world that practiced wargaming. This led to great worldwide interest in Kriegsspiel. The first Kriegsspiel manual in English, Rules for the Conduct of the War-Game by E. Baring, based on the system of Wilhelm von Tschischwitz, was published in 1872 for the British army and received a royal endorsement.

In the United States, Charles Adiel Lewis Totten published Strategos, the American War Game in 1880. In 1882, William R. Livermore published The American Kriegsspiel. In 1873, a group of students and teachers at Oxford University founded the University Kriegspiel [sic] Club, which was the world's first recreational wargaming club for civilians.

=== Kriegsspiel in the present day ===
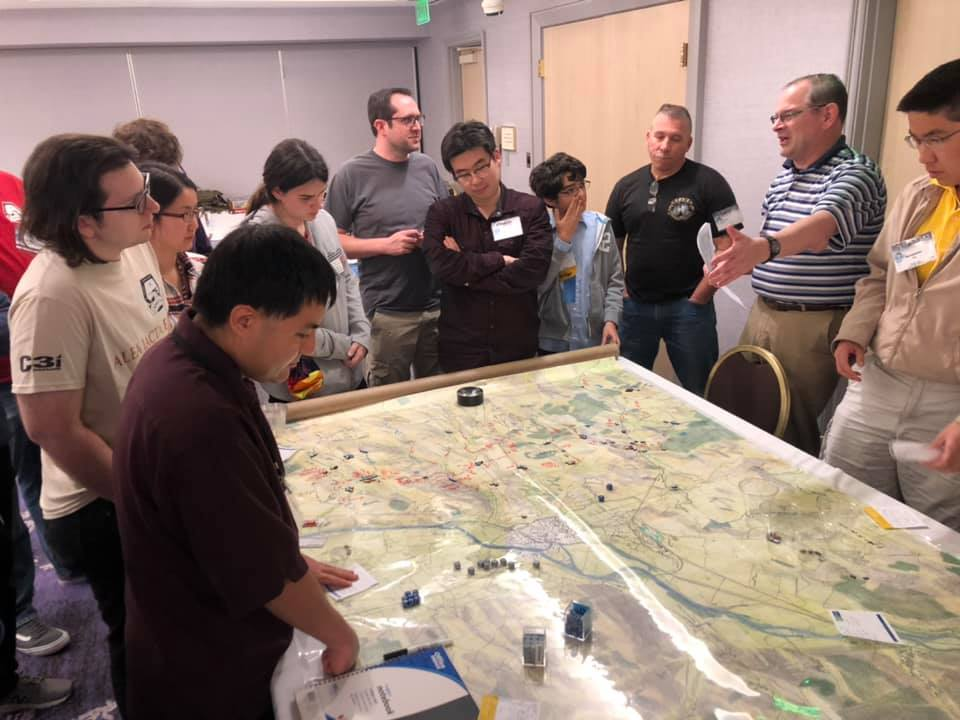
Players gather around a map for a debriefing by the umpire. Note the umpire's use of plastic that allows the recording of orders and other information.

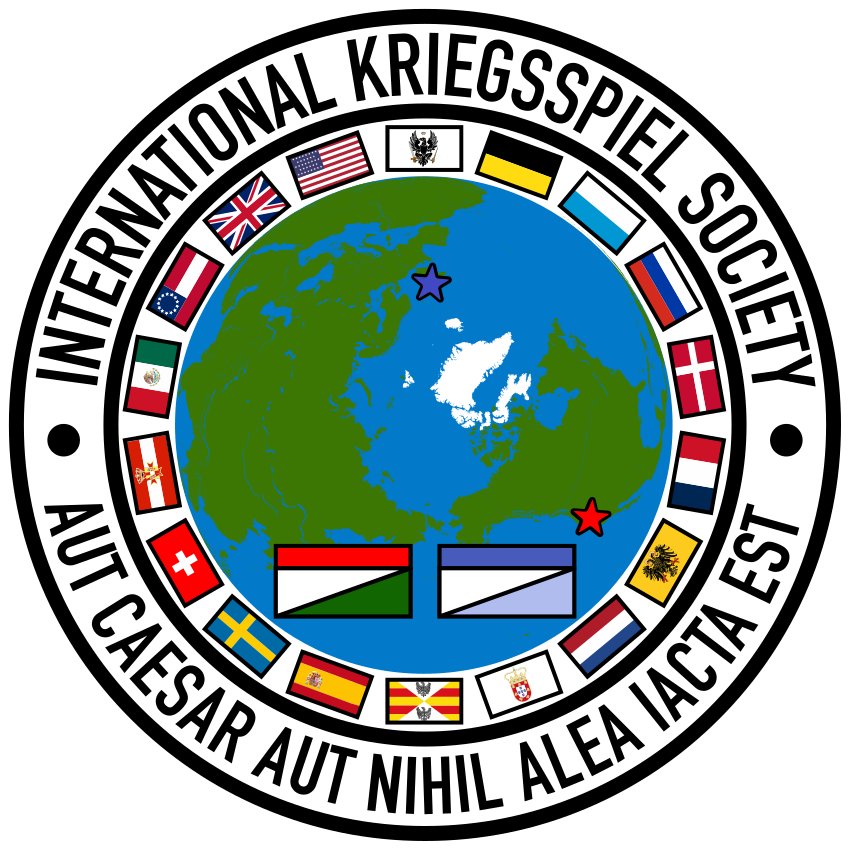
The emblem of the International Kriegsspiel Society.

Kriegsspiel has undergone a minor revival in the English-speaking world thanks to translations of the original rulebooks by a British wargaming enthusiast named Bill Leeson. At least three major, non-military, enthusiast groups play Kriegsspiel around the world. The game is also played for fun by other small groups and individuals, but because of the effort involved, such events are uncommon. The senior of the three major groups is The Kriegsspiel Society located in the town of Little Gaddesden, UK. The group plays face-to-face games several times per year.

The second group is the Southern California Kriegsspiel Society, based in Los Angeles. They meet at the Strategicon conventions in Los Angeles for face-to-face games. The third group is the International Kriegsspiel Society (IKS), established in 2021 by Marshall Neal as an outgrowth of the Southern California Kriegsspiel Society. The group uses Discord and Tabletop Simulator to coordinate and play games. As of 2025, the group has over 3,300 members, and hosts multiple games on a daily basis.

The International Kriegsspiel Society has modified the original rules of Kriegsspiel to allow for shorter games that can be played with larger numbers of players. Because Kriegsspiel requires a lot of effort from players and adjudication from umpires, the game is almost unplayable in its original form unless a large number of trained umpires or a small number of players participate. Small games with a single umpire and a few players are possible, but larger games can run slowly as the workload for umpires increases.

Therefore, the original rules are modified to preserve the critical components of Kriegsspiel, specifically, the games are umpired, double-blind, use simultaneous movement, emphasize fog of war, and feature delayed communications and execution of orders. The aim is to preserve realism while streamlining minutiae that can slow the game without adding value to the experience. The society also hosts games that play by post, meaning players submit orders online by message (email or Discord chat) and the turns are processed by an umpire on a regular basis.

In August 2021, the International Kriegsspiel Society ran what is likely the largest online, civilian Kriegsspiel up until then, with 48 participants. Six master umpires worked with 12 assistants to manage the game. The battle was inspired by the Battle of Gettysburg.

On July 15, 2023, the IKS ran an even larger game online. With 96 participants, of which 22 were umpires, "Grand Waterloo", based on the Battle of Waterloo, was the largest civilian online Kriegsspiel ever run. as another "Grand Battle", the IKS is preparing "Grand Leipzig 1813" for October 28, 2023.

== Reisswitz rules (1824) ==
This summary is based on an English translation of a wargaming manual written by Georg Heinrich Rudolf Johann von Reisswitz in 1824.

Reisswitz's wargame was an instructional tool designed to teach battlefield tactics to Prussian officers. It therefore aimed for maximum realism. The participants were expected to be well-versed in how battles were waged in the early 19th century. This was particularly true for the umpire, who had to arbitrate situations which the rules did not cover using their own expertise. Kriegsspiel was written by officers for other officers, not for laymen.

Kriegsspiel is an open-ended game with no fixed victory conditions. The objectives of the respective teams are determined by the umpire, and typically resemble the goals that an army might pursue in a real battlefield situation, such as expelling the enemy from a certain defensive position or inflicting a certain number of casualties.

The game is played between two teams and one umpire. Either team can have any number of players. Reisswitz recommended 4 to 6 players each and that they be equal in size. The players in a team will divide command of the troops between them and establish a hierarchy. Only the umpire needs to be fully familiar with the rules, as they manipulate the pieces on the map and computes the outcomes of combat, whereas the players describe what they want their troops to do as if they were issuing orders to real troops in the field.

=== Materials ===
The materials required include:

- Rectangular pieces that represented various kinds of troop formations
- Rulers and dividers
- Dice
- A topographical map (recommended scale is 1:8000)
- A rulebook
- Note paper
- Supplemental sheets of paper to track casualties and other information

The map represents the battlefield. Troop formations on the battlefield are represented on the map by little rectangular pieces. In Reisswitz's time, these pieces were made of lead, but modern reconstructions typically use plastic or wood. Each piece is painted with markings that denotes what kind of unit it represents, cavalry, infantry, etc., and the team it belongs to. The dimensions of each piece match the dimensions of the actual troop formation it represents, to the same scale as the map. Thus, each piece occupies an area on the map proportional to the space the actual troop formation would occupy in the field.

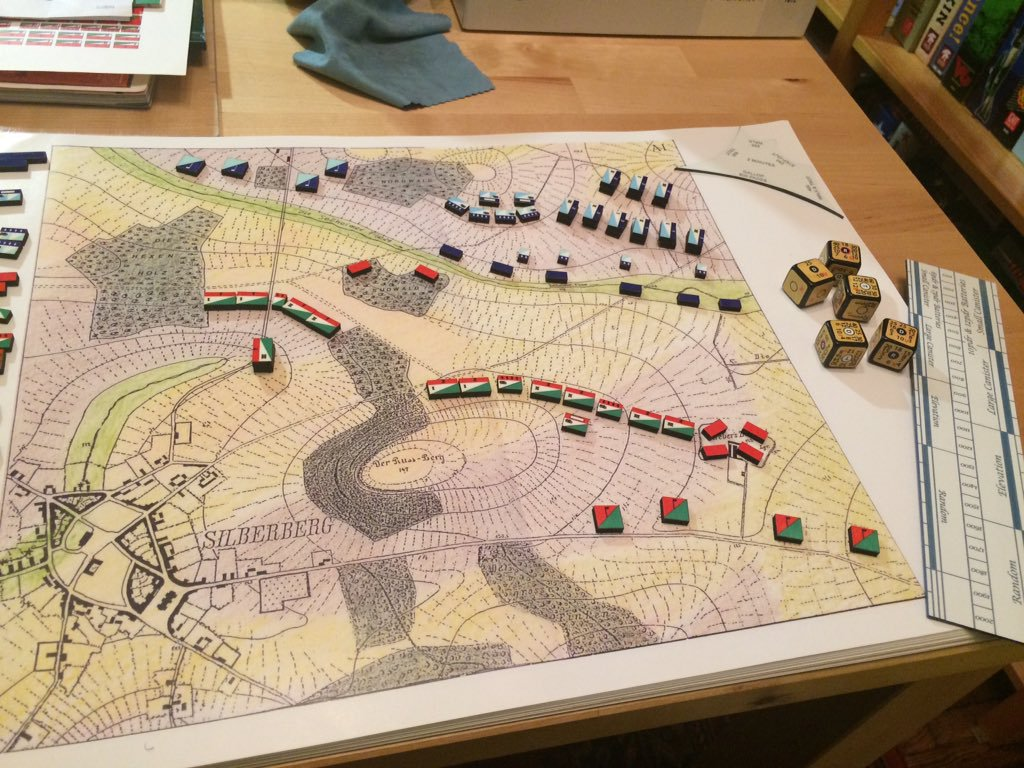
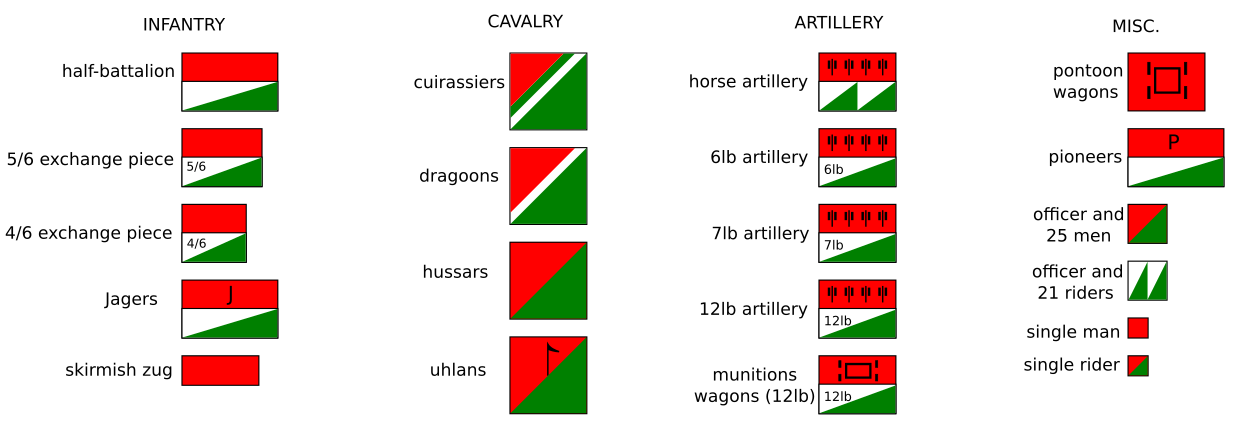

=== Order of play ===
The umpire establishes the scenario of the game. They determine the tactical objectives of the respective teams, what troops they are provided with and how those troops are initially deployed on the battlefield. The umpire will then assign each team the appropriate troop pieces for their units. If there are multiple players in a team, the teammates will divide control of their troops and establish a hierarchy of command in a way that should resemble Prussian military doctrine, subject to the umpire's approval.

Players do not speak to each other. Instead, they communicate with their teammates and the umpire through written messages to prevent the enemy team from hearing their plans. This also allows the umpire to delay or block messages if they feel the circumstances on the battlefield warrant it. This reflects how early 19th-century officers in the field communicated over long distances through messengers, who needed time to reach the recipient and could be delayed or intercepted by the enemy. The umpire can simulate this problem by holding on to a player's message for a round or two before giving it to the recipient, never giving it, or even giving it to the enemy. Likewise, players command their troops through written orders which they submit to the umpire, who then moves the pieces across the map. Players are not allowed to manipulate pieces directly; the umpire decides how troops would interpret and execute a given order and moves the pieces accordingly. This encourages players to communicate their orders clearly and concisely.

The umpire places pieces on the map only for troops which they judge to be visible to both sides. If a unit disappears from the enemy army's line of sight, the umpire will remove the piece from the map and keep it aside, meaning that participants must keep a mental record of the positions of troops whose pieces are not on the map. Players themselves may be represented on the battlefield with pieces that represent officers and their bodyguards. The positions of the officers on the battlefield affects how the players can communicate with each other and the troops. Officers can be slain in battle like any other soldier, and if that happens the player ceases to participate in the game.

The course of the game is divided into turns, which are executed simultaneously for both sides. A turn represents two minutes of time. In a turn the troops can perform as many actions as they realistically could in two minutes of time, and Reisswitz's manual provides some guidelines. There is, for instance, a table which lists movement rates for the various troop types under different conditions, e.g. in a turn, a cavalry squadron can move 400 paces (Note: Reisswitz used the Prussian imperial system of measurement, wherein 1 pace is 2 feet or 20 decimal inches, approximately 63 cm.) over open ground, 250 paces through light forest, and 100 paces up inclines.

=== Combat ===
The umpire uses dice to determine how much damage that attacking units inflict upon the enemy. The dice designed by Reisswitz are of unique design, with each face displaying a multitude of numbers and symbols that denoted different damage scores, measured in points, for different situations. There are five dice:

- Die I is used to determine ranged damage inflicted by line infantry and skirmishers fighting in the open, hand-to-hand combat results when both sides are even, and whether a howitzer attack sets a village on fire.
- Die II is used to determine ranged damage by skirmishers firing from cover, and hand-to-hand combat results when the odds are 3:2.
- Die III is used to determine damage inflicted by artillery under good conditions.
- Die IV is to determine hand-to-hand combat results when the odds are 3:1.
- Die V is used to determine damage inflicted by artillery under bad conditions, and hand-to-hand combat results when the odds are 4:1.

Kriegsspiel dice, modern replicas

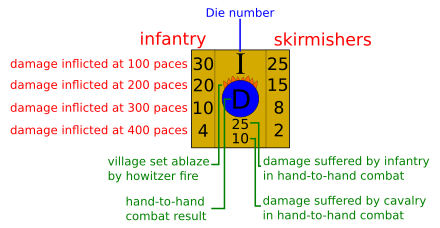
One face of Die I, which is used to determine ranged damage by infantry, and hand-to-hand combat results when the odds are even.

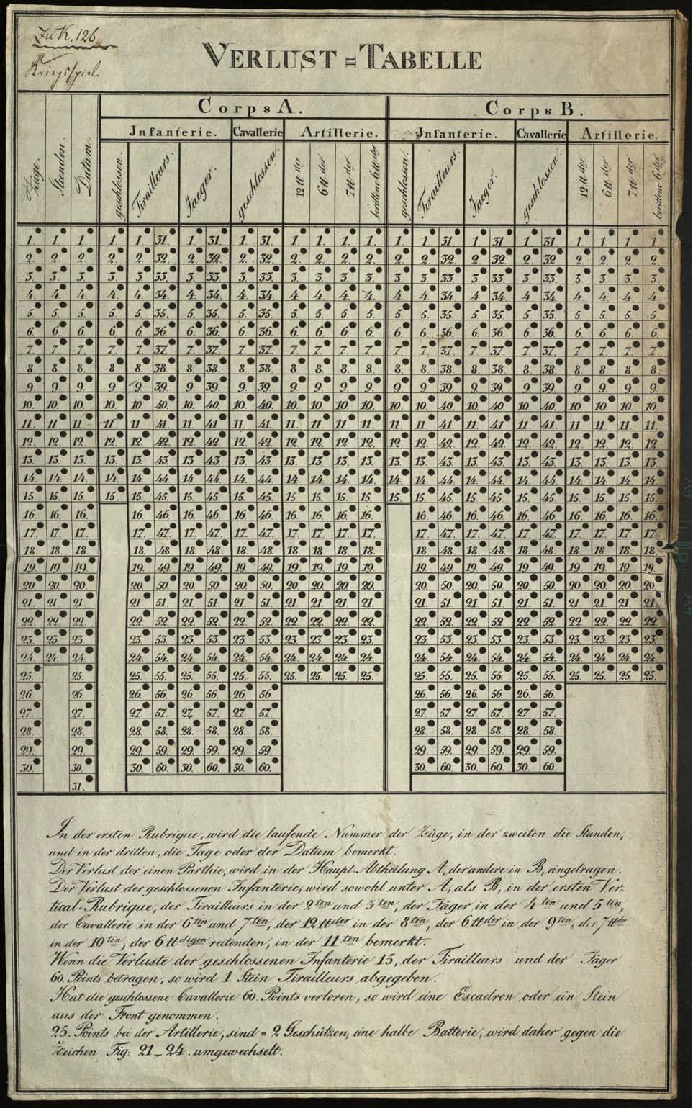
The losses table, which appears in Reisswitz's manual, is the primary method for tracking casualties.

Each unit has a point value, which represents how many points of damage the unit in question can absorb before "dying". In modern gaming parlance, this "point value" is analogous to "hitpoints". The number of hitpoints a unit has is determined by the type of unit, the number of men in it, and their formation. For instance, a cavalry squadron with 90 riders has 60 hitpoints. A line infantry half-battalion with 450 men has 90 hitpoints. Individual cavalry riders are "tougher" than infantrymen (1.5 hitpoints per rider vs 0.2 hitpoints per infantryman) because they moved faster and in looser formations, which meant a barrage of fire inflicted fewer casualties on them.

In most cases, a piece is simply removed from the map when it has lost all its hitpoints. An exception to this is line infantry because of how this unit functioned. On the 19th-century battlefield, infantry stood close together in long lines facing the enemy. A key tactical purpose of such lines was to obstruct the advance of enemy troops. When the line suffered casualties, this created gaps in the line through which enemy troops could slip by. If the defender didn't have reserve infantrymen with which to plug the gaps, this was a disaster, as then the enemy could move through the gaps to isolate and flank his troops. To represent this phenomenon on the game map, the game provides "exchange pieces" for infantry half-battalion pieces. An exchange piece resembles a regular half-battalion piece, but is marked with the fraction 5/6 or 4/6, which signifies that the half-battalion in question has lost either one sixth or two sixths of its men.

The exchange pieces are commensurately smaller in length. So if a half-battalion piece in a line of such pieces is replaced with an exchange piece, this will create a gap in the line. A half-battalion piece is removed from the map when it loses half of its hitpoints, because a half-battalion that had lost half of its men was considered ineffective in combat, and typically the men just fled the battlefield.

To track hitpoint loss, Reisswitz's original manual provided a sheet of paper called the "losses table". The losses table is divided into columns for line infantry, tirailleurs, jagers, cavalry, and artillery. Each column has a series of numbered dots. At the start of the game, the umpire shall stick one pin for each piece on the map in the first dot of the appropriate column. For instance, if the Red Army begins with three infantry pieces and two cavalry pieces, the umpire will stick three pins in the first dot in the infantry column and two pins in the first dot in the cavalry column.

Generally, the dot a pin is stuck in represents how many damage points the corresponding unit has accumulated. When a unit takes damage, the umpire will move the corresponding pin down its column to the appropriate dot. If a pin reaches the bottom of the column, then the corresponding piece is removed from the map, or in the case of line infantry, is replaced with an exchange piece. For instance: if a cavalry squadron suffers 10 points of damage, the umpire will move the corresponding pin ten dots down the cavalry column. If the pin reaches the 60th dot in the column, the cavalry unit has suffered a fatal level of casualties, and the umpire will then remove the corresponding piece from the map.

== Tschischwitz rules (1862) ==
Tschischwitz's version of Kriegsspiel was very much like Reisswitz's version, but it incorporated new advances in technologies and tactics. For instance, by 1862 the Prussian army had transitioned from muskets to breech-loading rifles and hence troops could inflict casualties at up to 900 paces instead of 400. Whereas Reisswitz used a unique set of dice, Tschischwitz used conventional gaming dice. His manual provided tables to translate dice rolls into combat outcomes.

Tschischwitz's game did not use line infantry exchange blocks. By 1862, Prussian battle doctrine had moved away from line infantry tactics to an emphasis on wider deployments. To represent this, the 1862 game represents infantry companies individually with their own blocks, so exchange blocks for battalions are no longer required. Rules for deploying skirmishers were updated to reflect the newer tactics.

Whereas Reisswitz's manual prescribed just one map around which all the participants were gathered, Tschischwitz's manual proposed the option of having multiple maps: one for the umpire which displayed the positions of all troops, and one for each team displaying only those troops which the respective team could see. The teams would be placed in separate rooms with their respective maps, so that they could not see the other team's map or the umpire's map.

== Verdy du Vernois' flexible approach (1876) ==
In his 1876 book, Contribution to Wargaming, Verdy du Vernois illustrated his concept of free Kriegsspiel with a long transcript of a game. A noted difference between classic Kriegsspiel and Verdy's approach is that the players had conversations with the umpire instead of communicating with written messages. Verdy's insight was that the only elements that were essential to Kriegsspiel were the umpire and hidden information.

== See also ==
- Military simulation

== Bibliography ==
- Caffrey, Matthew B. (2019). "On Wargaming: How Wargames Have Shaped History and How They May Shape the Future". The Newport Papers (43). Naval War College Press (US). ISBN 978-1-935352-65-5.
- Wilhelm von Tschischwitz. Richard Clarke (ed.). The von Tschischwitz Kriegsspiel 1862. Translated by Bill Leeson. Too Fat Lardies.
- Phillip von Hilgers (2000). "Eine Anleitung zur Anleitung. Das Takstische Kriegsspiel 1812-1824" (PDF). Board Games Studies: International Journal for the Study of Board Games (in German) (3): 59–78. Archived from the original (PDF) on 2009-07-10.
- George Leopold von Reiswitz (1812). Taktisches Kriegs-Spiel oder Anleitung zu einer mechanischen Vorrichtung um taktische Manoeuvres sinnlich darzustellen [Tactical War Game - or, instruction to a mechanical device to simulate tactical maneuvers] (in German). Gädicke.
- Georg Heinrich Rudolf Johann von Reisswitz (1824). Anleitung zur Darstellung militairische Manover mit dem Apparat des Kriegsspiel [Instructions for the Representation of Military Maneuvers with the Kriegsspiel Apparatus] (in German).

- Georg Heinrich Rudolf Johann von Reisswitz (1824). The von Reisswitz Kriegsspiel: The Prussian Army Wargame. Translated by Bill Leeson.

- Peter P. Perla (2012) [1st pub. 1990]. John Curry (ed.). Peter Perla's The Art of Wargaming: A Guide for Professionals and Hobbyists. The History of Wargaming Project. ISBN 978-1-4716-2242-7.
- Jon Peterson (2012). Playing at the World: A History of Simulating Wars, People and Fantastic Adventures, from Chess to Role-playing Games. Unreason Press. ISBN 9780615642048.
- Heinrich Ernst Dannhauer (11 July 1874). "Das Reißwissche Kriegsspiel von seinem Beginn bis zum Tode des Erfinders 1827" [The Reiswitzian Wargame from its Inception until the death of the inventor in 1827]. Militär-Wochenblatt. Vol. 59, no. 56. pp. 527–532.
- Thilo von Trotha (1874). "Zum Kriegsspiel". Jahrbücher für die deutsche Armee und Marine. pp. 180–193.
- Julius von Verdy du Vernois (1876). Beitrag zum Kriegsspiel [Contribution to Wargaming] (in German). Ernst Siegfried Mittler und Sohn.
- John Curry (2008). Verdy's Free Kriegspiel Including the Victorian Army's 1896 War Game. Lulu.com. ISBN 9781409227960.
- "Foreign War Games". Selected Professional Papers Translated from European Military Publications. Translated by H. O. S. Heistand. Washington D.C.: US Government Printing Office. 1898. pp. 233–289.
- Pat Harrigan; Matthew G. Kirschenbaum, eds. (2016). Zones of Control: Perspectives on Wargaming. MIT Press. ISBN 9780262334938.
- Clancy, Kelly (June 16, 2024). "The Original War Game: The invention of Kriegsspiel, a detailed tabletop simulation of battle, revolutionized 19th-century warfare and laid the groundwork for today's role playing games". Wall Street Journal.
- Clancy, Kelly (June 24, 2024). "How games and game theory have changed the world". The Economist.
