= Tadashi Ehara =

American game designer

- Occupation: Game designer

Tadashi Ehara is a game designer who has worked primarily on role-playing games.

== Career ==
Tadashi Ehara worked as the buyer for the Gambit game store in San Francisco when he became the second employee of Chaosium. Different Worlds magazine was launched in 1979 by Ehara and Greg Stafford of Chaosium as a general-interest role-playing magazine. Ehara became the first editor of Different Worlds, and stayed on as the editor-in-chief for the entire run of the magazine. Ehara left Chaosium in 1985 because of financial difficulties the company was having and took Different Worlds with him, and resumed publishing with Different Worlds #39 (May/June 1985) through his Sleuth Publications whom he became partners with; although Sleuth only published eight issues over a two-year period, ending with Different Worlds #46 (May/June 1987). Ehara later purchased a large portion of the Judges Guild inventory. Ehara purchased Gamelords for Sleuth Publications in 1986, and on December 1, 1986 they sent him 10,000 pounds of backstock packed into 344 cartons. Ehara acquired a license to publish the Empire of the Petal Throne role-playing game through Sleuth. Ehara later withdrew from Sleuth after working with them for two years, taking all of the role-playing game products and properties he acquired in that time. Ehara then used Different Worlds to form the new company Different Worlds Publications, although he released only one final issue as Different Worlds #47 (Fall 1987). Ehara also published a reprint of Empire of the Petal Throne (1987), and a reprint of part of the second Tékumel role-playing game Swords & Glory (1987-1988) which was originally published by Gamescience.
