= Royal Prussian Order of Saint John =

Order of merit in the Kingdom of Prussia

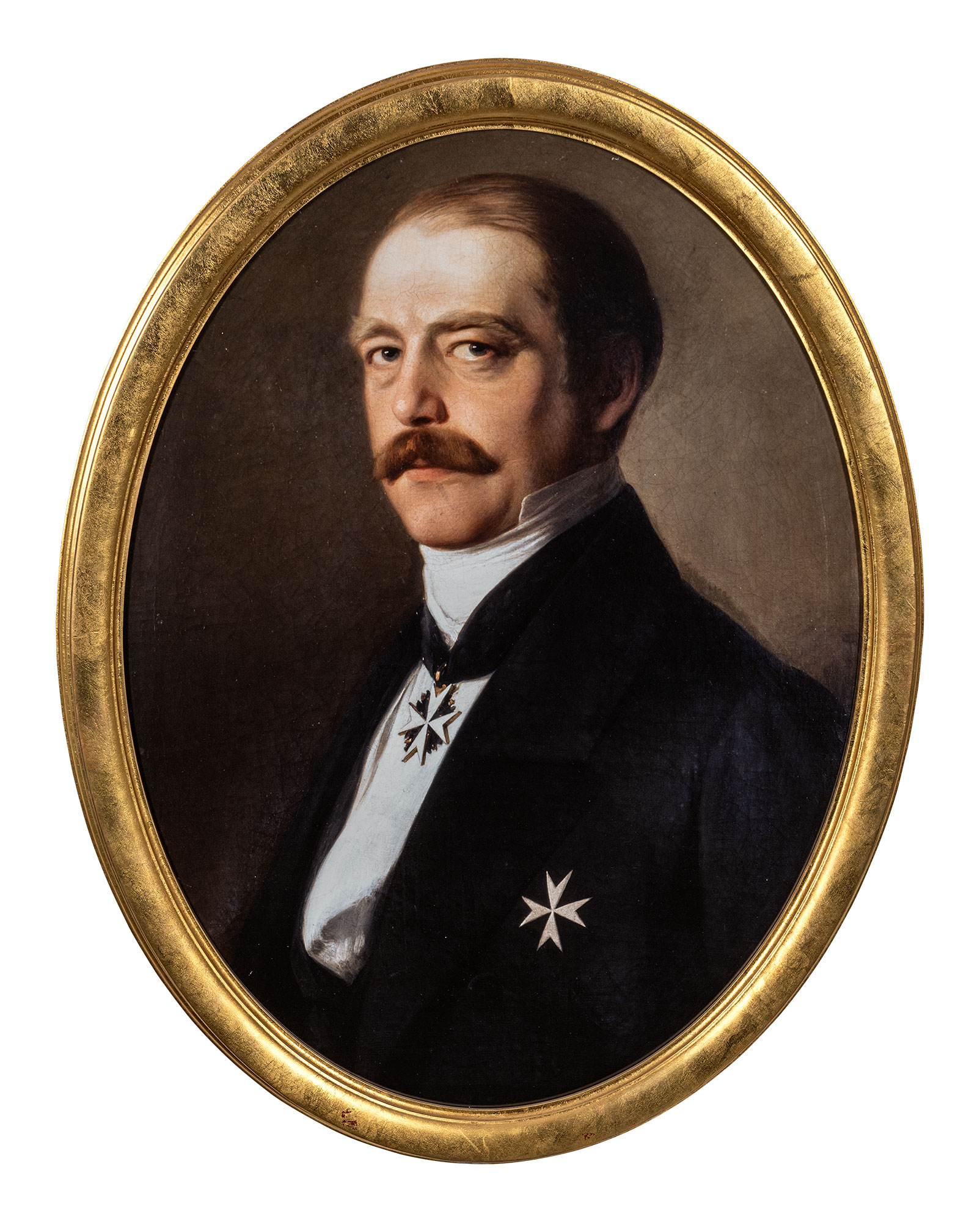
Otto von Bismarck wearing the order's insignia

The Royal Prussian Order of Saint John (German: Königlich Preußische St. Johanniter-Orden) was an order of merit in the Kingdom of Prussia. It was set up in 1812 and was awarded until the inauguration of the modern Order of Saint John in 1852.

== History ==
The former Order of Saint John (Brandenburg Bailiwick of the Knightly Order of Saint John of the Hospital of Jerusalem) was dissolved and all its possessions confiscated by the state due to an edict of 30 October 1810 and the royal charter of Frederick William III of Prussia dated 23 January 1811. The last Lord Master of the old Order, Prince Augustus Ferdinand of Prussia, became the first Grand Master of the new Order, though he died in 1813 and was succeeded as Grand Master by Prince Henry of Prussia.

== Insignia ==
The insignia of the 'new Order' was an eight pointed gold and white-enamel cross (without a surmounting crown but with a black Prussian eagle in a gold crown in each of its four arms) and a white cross, the latter to be worn on the recipient's left breast. The Order's Grand Master wore a larger cross around his neck and on his breast. Both the Grand Master and the Knights were authorised to wear the Order's uniform.

== Bibliography ==
- (in German) Axel von Campenhausen: Der Johanniterorden. In: Ders., Joachim E. Christoph (editor): Gesammelte Schriften. Band 1 (Ius ecclesiasticum 50). Mohr, Tübingen 1995, S. 233 ff.
