= Castle Book II =

Role-playing game supplement

Castle Book II is a universal role-playing game supplement published by Judges Guild in 1981.

== Publication history ==
Following the release of Castle Book I in 1978, Judges Guild followed up in 1979 with Castle Book II, a 64-page softcover book written by Bob Bledsaw. The book was published in several editions from 1979 to 1981; early editions have a black & white cover, later editions a full-color cover.

== Contents ==
Castle Book II is a gamemaster's aid that contains 50 maps of castles and forts drawn on hex sheets, intended to be used in wilderness encounters or for campaign design, and also contains tables for generating castle names randomly. The material is not designed for a specific game system, allowing the gamemaster to adapt the material to any fantasy role-playing game.

== Reception ==
In the May 1988 edition of Dragon (Issue #133), Ken Rolston said, "There are no details for the functions or contents of the individual buildings, but it’s nice to have the layouts when whipping up an adventure setting on short notice."

Ken Rolston reviewed Castle Book II and The Palladium Book of European Castles in White Wolf #40 (1994) and stated that "I only use European Castles for real quick-and-dirty improvisation. On the other hand, Castle Book II curiously remains fresh and useful for me despite its outdated design."
