= Different Worlds Publications =

Company that publishes the magazine of the same name

Different Worlds Publications is an American game company that produces role-playing games and game supplements.

== History ==
Tadashi Ehara used Different Worlds as the basis of a new company, Different Worlds Publications, although he only put out one more issue of Different Worlds, #47 (Fall 1987). From 1987-1989, Ehara also published a reprint of Empire of the Petal Throne (1987), and a reprint of part of Gamescience's Swords & Glory (1987-1988), the second Tékumel RPG.

Ehara picked up Boardcraft Simulation's gaming accessories line: Fantasy Paths (1981), Castle Paths (1981), and Village Paths (1981).

Different Worlds Publications published Robert J. Kuntz's The Eight Kings (2004), the final book in the four-book adventure series after it was abandoned by Necromancer Games.
