= Tékumel =

Campaign setting and fictional universe

- Created by: M. A. R. Barker
- Genre: Fantasy, role-playing game

In-universe information
- Race: Human
- Location: Tékumel universe

Tékumel is a fantasy world created by American linguist and writer M. A. R. Barker over the course of several decades from around 1940. In this imaginary world, huge, tradition-bound empires with medieval levels of technology vie for control using magic, large standing armies, and ancient technological devices. In time, Barker created the tabletop role-playing game Empire of the Petal Throne, set in the Tékumel universe, initially self publishing it in 1974. Later, Barker wrote a series of five novels set in Tékumel, beginning with The Man of Gold, first published by DAW Books in 1984.

== Sources ==
The setting provided a context for Barker's constructed languages which were developed in parallel from the mid-to-late 1940s, long before the mass-market publication of his works as the roleplaying game and book forms.

The most developed language created by Barker for his setting is Tsolyáni, which resembles Urdu, Pashto and Nahuatl. Tsolyáni has had grammatical guides, dictionaries, pronunciation recordings, and even a complete language course developed for it. In order for his imaginary languages to have this type of depth, Barker developed entire cultures, histories, dress fashions, architectural styles, weapons, armor, tactical styles, legal codes, demographics and more. They were inspired by Indian, Middle Eastern, Egyptian and Central American mythology in contrast to the majority of such fantasy settings, which draw primarily on European mythologies.

== Setting ==
The world of Tékumel, a fictional planet around star Nu Ophiuchi (a.k.a. Sinistra), was first settled by humans exploring the galaxy about 60,000 years in the future, along with several other alien species. Their extensive terraforming of the inhospitable environment, including changing the planet's orbit and rotation rate to create a 365-day year, disrupted local ecologies and banished most of the local flora and fauna (including some intelligent species) to small reservations in the corners of their own world, resulting in a golden age of technology and prosperity for Mankind and its allies. Tékumel became a resort world, where the wealthy from a thousand other stars could while away their time next to its warm seas.

=== Layout ===
Suddenly, in the 1120th century (according to Shawn Bond) and for reasons unknown, Tékumel and its star system (Tékumel's two moons, Gayél and Káshi, its sun, Tuléng, and four other planets, Ülétl, Riruchél, Shíchel, and Zirúna) were cast out of our reality into a "pocket dimension" (known as a béthorm in Tsolyáni), in which there were no other star systems. One hypothesis is that this isolation happened through hostile action on the part of an unknown party or group. Another is that the cosmic cataclysm was due to over-use of a faster than light drive which warped the fabric of space. No one knows, but the inhabitants of Tékumel, both human, native, and representatives of the other star-faring races, were now isolated and alone. The novels contain vague clues as to what might have happened.

Severed from vital interplanetary trade routes (Tékumel is a world very poor in heavy metals) and in the midst of a massive gravitic upheaval due to the lines of gravitational force between the stars being suddenly cut, civilization was thrown into chaos. The intelligent native species, the Hlǘss and the Ssú, broke free from their reservations and wars as destructive as the massive geographic changes ravaged the planet. Several other significant changes took place due to the crisis: mankind discovered it could now tap into ultraplanar energies that were seen as magical forces, the stars were gone from the sky, and dimensional nexuses were uncovered. Pacts with "demons" (inhabitants of dimensions near in n-dimensional space to Tékumel's pocket dimension) were made and a complex pantheon of "gods" (powerful extra-dimensional or multi-dimensional alien beings) discovered. Science began to stagnate until ultimately knowledge became grounded in traditions handed down from generations long ago. The belief that the universe was ultimately understandable slowly faded and a Time of Darkness descended over the planet.

Much of Barker's writing concerns a time approximately 50,000 years after Tékumel has entered its pocket dimension. Five vast tradition-oriented civilizations occupy a large portion of the northern continent. These five human empires (Livyánu, Mu′ugalavyá, Salarvyá, Tsolyánu, Yán Kór), along with various non-human allies (Ahoggyá, Chíma, Hegléth, Hláka, Hlutrgú, Ninín, Páchi Léi, Pé Chói, Shén, Tinalíya) who are descended from other star faring races, vie to control resources, including other planar "magical powers" and ancient technology, as they vie for survival and supremacy among themselves as well as hostile and other non-human races (Hlǘss, Ssú, Hokún, Mihálli, Nyaggá, Urunén, Vléshga).

Much of the gaming materials and other writings focus particularly on these Five Empires (Tsolyánu in particular) which control much of the world's northern continent (only about an eighth of the planet's surface has published maps).

=== Languages ===
Tsolyáni is one of several languages spoken on the world of Tékumel, and was the first conlang published as part of a role-playing game. Barker put great effort into the languages of Tékumel. Although Tsolyáni is the only Tekumeláni language that has had a full grammar book, dictionary, pronunciation tapes (on CD) and a primer, publicly released, it is not the only language for this world that Barker developed.

Also available are grammar guides for the Yán Koryáni and Livyáni languages which are spoken in two other of the "Five Empires" of the known parts of Tékumel, as well as grammar books for Engsvanyáli and Sunúz. These two languages are now extinct, dead languages. Engsvanyáli is of use as it is the root language for Tsolyáni and many of the other currently spoken languages of the known parts of Tékumel. Sunúz is of interest because, although it is obscure, it is quite useful for sorcerous purposes. For instance, Sunúz contains terms to describe movement in a six-dimensional multi-planar space, something of use to beings who visit the other planar realms where "demons" live.

Barker also published extensively on scripts for other languages of Tékumel.

== Published works ==
=== Board games ===
Barker designed War of Wizards, a combat-oriented board game, based on his world of Tékumel, published by TSR in 1975.

=== Roleplaying ===
Barker was a Professor of Urdu and South Asian Studies at the University of Minnesota during the period when David Arneson, Gary Gygax and a handful of others were developing the first tabletop role-playing games in the Twin Cities and Lake Geneva, Wisconsin. Barker tapped into this tradition and the setting he had developed from his childhood fantasies (much as H. G. Wells had done for his Floor Games leading into the better-known follow-up, Little Wars) to further explore and develop Tékumel. His "Thursday Night Groups" were amongst the first roleplaying sessions anywhere and provided what was, at the time, an unusually detailed week-by-week development of the setting. In 1975, TSR, Inc., the publishers of Dungeons & Dragons, published Barker's roleplaying game and setting as a standalone game under the title of The Empire of the Petal Throne (a synonym for the Tsolyáni Empire), rather than as a "supplement" to the original D&D rules.

Tékumel has spawned five professionally published roleplaying games over the course of the years:

- Empire of the Petal Throne, published in 1975 as a boxed set by TSR and reprinted later as a single book by Different Worlds Publications in 1987.
- Swords & Glory, published in 1983/84 in two volumes by Gamescience. These volumes were Swords & Glory, Volume 1: Tékumel Source Book and Swords & Glory, Volume 2: Tékumel Player's Handbook.
- Gardásiyal: Adventures on Tékumel, published in 1994 by Theatre of the Mind Enterprises.
- Tékumel: Empire of the Petal Throne, published in 2005 by Guardians of Order.
- Béthorm, published in 2014 by UNIgames, was written by Jeff Dee.

There have been a wide variety of materials of all sorts published over the years to further detail this world. As well as the language materials, these include Deeds of the Ever-Glorious — a History of the Tsolyani Legions, The Tékumel Bestiary, and The Book of Ebon Bindings, a guide to the demonic beings that are known to the Tsolyáni, and a six volume series of booklets that details the armies of each of the Five Empires as well as surrounding states and the vast lands of the reptilian Shén. There have also been various wargames rules as well as small scale metal miniatures to represent the various races and legions. Miniatures for the world were formerly produced in 28mm scale under license by Eureka Miniatures of Australia, but are now being made by a smaller, fan-driven company in Canada called The Tékumel Project.

Other materials involving the setting include The Tomb Complex of Nereshánbo, A Jakállan Intrigue, The Tsolyáni Language, Qadardalikoi, The Armies of Tékumel, The Art of Tactical Sorcery, Gazetteer for the Northwest Frontier Map Set, The Northwest Frontier, and EPT Miniatures.

As interest in the game is driven to a large extent by a highly devoted, small number of enthusiasts, there have also been several non-commercially published rules as well as systems to adapt the Tékumel setting to other pre-existing, commercially available role playing rules including RuneQuest, GURPS, and third edition Dungeons & Dragons. Many of these are available on the internet.

=== Novels ===
In 1984, DAW Books published Barker's Tékumel novel The Man of Gold. This was followed by Flamesong in 1985. In 2003, Zottola Publishing published three additional novels: Prince of Skulls, Lords of Tsámra, and A Death of Kings. In 2004, Zottola Publishing produced the two-volume set Mitlanyál, which deals with the Tsolyáni pantheon and provides much background regarding the Tsolyáni culture.

The chronological order of the novels (as opposed to their order of publication) is as follows:

1. The Man of Gold (1984)
2. Flamesong (1985)
3. Lords of Tsámra (2003)
4. Prince of Skulls (2002)
5. A Death of Kings (2003)

=== The Tékumel Journal ===
The Journal of Tékumel Affairs (later known as The Tékumel Journal) was a magazine published by Tékumel Games that began publication in 1977, devoted to the Empire of the Petal Throne and Swords & Glory role-playing systems.

Frederick Paul Kiesche III reviewed The Journal of Tékumel Affairs in Space Gamer No. 71. Kiesche commented that "In sum, a useful item, especially if the company can overcome production and transition problems and start putting out an item of higher production quality. Well worth looking at."
