= M. A. R. Barker =

Linguist, scholar, author and game designer (1929–2012)

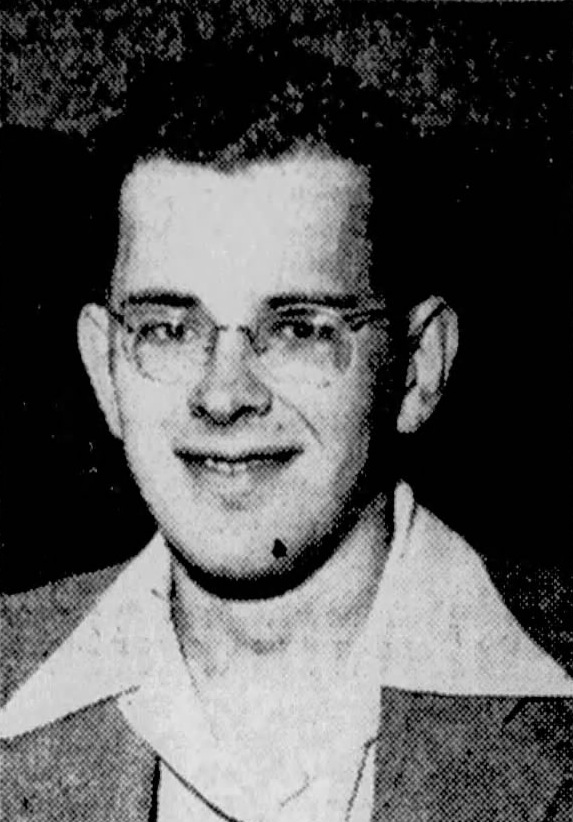
- Barker in 1951
- Born: Phillip Barker; November 2, 1929; Spokane, Washington, U.S.
- Died: March 16, 2012 (aged 82); Minneapolis, Minnesota, U.S.
- Occupations: Linguist; scholar; professor; game designer; author
- Writing career
- Pen name: Randolph D. Calverhall
- Period: 1949–2012
- Genres: Linguistics, role-playing games, fantasy, science fantasy

Muhammad Abd-al-Rahman Barker (born Phillip Barker; November 2, 1929 – March 16, 2012) was an American linguist who was professor of Urdu and South Asian Studies and created one of the first roleplaying games, Empire of the Petal Throne. He wrote several fantasy and science fantasy novels based in his associated world setting of Tékumel.

Between 1990 and 2002, he was a member of the Editorial Advisory Committee of the Journal of Historical Review, which advocated Holocaust denial. In 1991 he published a neo-Nazi novel, Serpent's Walk, under the pseudonym Randolph D. Calverhall.

== Early life ==
Barker was born Phillip Barker in Spokane, Washington, on November 2, 1929. Barker's childhood was spent in Idaho. He grew up with an interest in science fiction, fantasy, and ancient Egyptian and ancient Mayan cultures. At the age of 10, he first imagined what was later to become his fantasy setting of Tékumel.

== Academic life and creative networking ==
Barker began studying linguistics and culture at the University of Washington. In and just before 1950, while Barker was studying at the University of Washington under Melville Jacobs, he became involved with science fiction fanzines, contributing to the zines Fanscient and to the local clubzine Sinisterra.

He graduated from the University of Washington in 1951. That year, he received a Fulbright Scholarship to study the languages of India, and on his first trip to India, converted to Islam. Gary Fine wrote that Barker would attribute his conversion to "purely theological reasons [and that] it seemed like a more logical religion", though Barker himself admitted at the time to an "[unimaginable] feeling of awe and religious ecstasy" upon hearing the recitations of the 99 Names of Allah at the Taj Mahal. While in India, he studied at the University of Lucknow.

== Later academic studies and career ==
Barker attended the University of California, Berkeley for graduate studies, writing a dissertation on Klamath language, collecting traditional myths, legends, tales, and oral histories and later publishing a grammar and dictionary on the language.

He taught at the Institute of Islamic Studies at McGill University from around 1958/59 until 1972 and became active in the development of Urdu and Baluchi instruction materials for English-speaking students following a period of two years from 1960 when he was attached to the University of the Punjab. Some of these were still recommended university course study materials as of 2010. From 1972 he moved to teach at the University of Minnesota, where he chaired the Department of South Asian studies until his retirement in the early 1990s; a few years after, the department was disbanded due to reduced funding.

== Tékumel ==
While at Berkeley, Barker had not set aside his world creation project. Indeed, despite stepping back from an active role in science fiction fandom, he had commenced "proto-gaming" with a group of like-minded science fiction fans including fellow linguist Bill Shipley and Victor Golla, producing elaborate documents to support the exploration of that shared world.

Having watched the Dungeons & Dragons games started by Mike Mornard, one of the original testers for D&D, when Mornard moved to Minneapolis from Lake Geneva, Wisconsin, Barker resolved to create his own ruleset based on his own created world and the game mechanics from D&D. After six weeks, this was self-published in August 1974 as Empire of the Petal Throne and play commenced forthwith, including such occasional members as Dave Arneson – who singled out Barker and Tékumel as being his favorite Dungeon Master and roleplaying game, respectively – from early days.

Once Gary Gygax's attention had been drawn to Barker's work, it was decided that TSR would publish a revised version of the game mechanics along with a condensed version of his campaign setting. Empire of the Petal Throne was published by TSR in August 1975 for Gen Con VIII, making it the third role-playing game from TSR. In a December 1976 editorial for The Dragon magazine, editor Tim Kask drew comparisons between the world of Tékumel and J. R. R. Tolkien's Middle-earth not in terms of literature created, nor that his work was derivative of Tolkien's, but rather regarding the in-depth detail in the setting, mythos and linguistic backgrounds and concluded that "In terms of development of detail, I think EPT [Empire of the Petal Throne] has it over Middle Earth in the matters that most concern gamers".

Barker disliked the limited support TSR gave to the setting, and after 1977 he took his Tékumel setting back from TSR and ultimately brought it from one publisher to another: Imperium Publishing (1978), Adventure Games (1981), Gamescience (1983–1984), Tékumel Games (1983–1986), Different Worlds Publications (1987–1988), TOME (1991–1994), Tita's House of Games (1997–2002), Zottola Publishing (2002–2003), and Guardians of Order (2005). Barker had a personal friendship with Dave Arneson, which led to Arnesons's company Adventures Games releasing several books for Tékumel, such as army lists, maps and reference material. DAW published the novel The Man of Gold (July 1984) by Barker, which took place in Tékumel. His second novel, Flamesong (1985), was also published by DAW.

Despite having had a head start on other in-depth campaign settings and seeing his game released no less than four times with various supplements and magazine articles, many of which he contributed to, and having authored five books using the same setting, Barker's Tékumel in both roleplaying and literary domains is still well known to only a relatively small audience, leading German magazine Der Spiegel in 2009 to publish an article on Barker's life entitled "Der vergessene Tolkien" ("The forgotten Tolkien"). The article quotes friends and acquaintances who posit that this may be, at least in part, due to the unfamiliarity of the setting compared with Western society, echoing Fine's observations from 1983, and possibly even that Tékumel was released to the gaming world too early on, when players had only just started to experiment with their own invented worlds rather than fitting their play into preconfigured, non-literary domains with novel backgrounds.

In 2008, Barker founded the Tékumel Foundation along with many of his long-time players "to support and protect the literary works and all related products and activities surrounding [his] world of Tékumel and the Empire of the Petal Throne." The Foundation acts as his literary executor.

== Serpent's Walk and Holocaust denial ==
Barker wrote a sixth novel, Serpent's Walk, under the pseudonym Randolph D. Calverhall, an allusion to one of Barker's ancestors. Serpent's Walk is a science fiction story, presenting an alternate history in which SS soldiers begin an underground resistance after the end of World War II. A hundred years later, their descendants take over the United States of America. The book's protagonist becomes the Führer and worldwide dictator of the Fourth Reich. The book espouses the belief in an international Jewish conspiracy, suggests the solution to the "Jewish question" is genocide, and extensively quotes Mein Kampf. The novel was published in 1991 by National Vanguard Books, the book publishing division of the neo-Nazi group the National Alliance, which published white supremacist and neo-Nazi material including The Turner Diaries.

Starting in 1990, Barker also served as a member of the Editorial Advisory Committee of the Journal of Historical Review, a journal that advocates Holocaust denial and revisionist pseudohistory; Barker's involvement ended when the journal ceased in 2002. In March 2022, the Tékumel Foundation confirmed Barker's authorship of Serpent's Walk and association with the Journal of Historical Review. The Foundation repudiated Barker's views in the novel, from which it does not receive royalties, and apologized for not acknowledging its authorship earlier.

== Death ==
Barker died in home hospice on March 16, 2012. He was survived by his wife, Ambereen.

== Partial bibliography ==
=== Language texts ===
Barker studied various languages academically and helped author and co-author various publications relating to some of those, including the following:

Published by the University of California Press:

- Klamath Texts (1963)
- Klamath Dictionary (1963)
- Klamath Grammar (1964)

Published by the McGill University Institute of Islamic Studies:

- A Course in Urdu (1967)
- An Urdu Newspaper Reader (1968)
- A Reader of Modern Urdu Poetry (1968)
- A Course in Baluchi (1969)

=== Roleplaying ===
Tékumel has spawned five professionally published roleplaying games over the course of the years. It was also reportedly a major influence on other creations such as Hârn and the Skyrealms of Jorune.

- Empire of the Petal Throne (1975) as a boxed set by TSR, Inc. following earlier self-publication in 1974, and reprinted later as a single book by Different Worlds in 1987.
- Swords & Glory (1983/4) in two volumes by Gamescience.
- Gardásiyal: Adventures on Tékumel (1994) by Theatre of the Mind Enterprises; with Neil R. Cauley.
- Tekumel: Empire of the Petal Throne (2005) by Guardians of Order; by various, with M.A.R. Barker.
- Bethorm: The Plane of Tékumel (2014) by UNIGames; by Jeff Dee and M.A.R. Barker.

=== Novels ===
Barker wrote five novels set in the world of Tékumel - in chronological reading order these are:

1. The Man of Gold (1984)
2. Flamesong (1985)
3. Lords of Tsámra (2003)
4. Prince of Skulls (2002)
5. A Death of Kings (2003)

=== Novels (non-Tékumel) ===
1. Serpent's Walk (1991)

== See also ==
- Tsolyáni language
