= Empire of the Petal Throne =

Fantasy roleplaying game

- Cover
- Designers: M. A. R. Barker
- Publication: 1974 (self-published); 1975 (TSR boxed set); 1987 (reprint of 1975 edition); 2005 (Guardians of Order edition)
- Genres: Role-playing game, fantasy, science fantasy, science fiction

Empire of the Petal Throne (EPT) is a fantasy role-playing game designed by M. A. R. Barker, based on his Tékumel fictional universe. It was self-published in 1974, then published by TSR, Inc. in 1975. It was one of the first tabletop role-playing games, along with Dungeons & Dragons, and was the first published RPG game setting. Over the subsequent thirty years, several new games were published based on the Tékumel setting; however, to date, none have met with commercial success. While published as fantasy, the game is sometimes classified as science fantasy or, debatably, as science fiction.

== History ==
=== Origin ===
M. A. R. Barker, a professor at the University of Minnesota and a scholar focusing on ancient languages, had been crafting his fantasy world that known as Tékumel for decades, writing out its history, culture and languages on thousands of pages. He assisted the wargaming club at the university as an adviser, where a club-mate and role-playing game player Michael Mornard introduced him to the Dungeons & Dragons role-playing game. Barker first self-published 50 copies of his own role-playing game, Empire of the Petal Throne in 1974, the same year that Dungeons & Dragons was published. This version is now referred to as "Manuscript edition". "Empire of the Petal Throne" is a synonym for the Tsolyáni Empire in game.

Barker also wrote the combat-focused War of Wizards board game, another game based in Tékumel, which TSR published in 1975.

=== 1975 TSR edition ===
Empire of the Petal Throne influenced Dave Arneson and Gary Gygax, who were impressed with the game. Barker made his commercial game-design debut at TSR, Inc., the publishers of Dungeons & Dragons, with Empire of the Petal Throne boxed set in 1975. TSR published Barker's game and setting as a standalone game, rather than as a "supplement" to the original D&D rules.

The game brought a level of detail and quality to the concept of a campaign setting which had previously been unknown in the nascent RPG industry's publications.

The game was the subject of articles in early issues of Dragon magazine, but factors such as inconsistent support from TSR led to its decline in popularity. TSR was locked into a deal that made the financial end of the game unpalatable to them. They had agreed to pay a "finder's fee" on sales in addition to royalties as well as to certain expensive overrides. As a result, the product was more expensive and thus less profitable.

=== Nightmare Maze of Jigrésh ===
In 1981, Judges Guild acquired the license to publish an EPT adventure, The Nightmare Maze of Jigrésh, a 16-page booklet written by Michael E. Mayeau, with illustrations by Ken Simpson. In Issue 42 of The Space Gamer, William A. Barton gave a favorable review, saying, "if you have character of at least level 5 in your EPT campaign, and the players aren't the sort who lose interest quickly, The Nightmare Maze of Jigresh may prove to be an interesting change of pace for your Tekumelian excursions."

=== Later editions ===
Empire of the Petal Throne was reprinted later as a single book by Different Worlds Publications in 1987.

Theatre of the Mind Enterprises began publishing supplements in 1992, including Adventures on Tekumel Part 1. Adventures on Tekumel, Part 2, Vol 1, Adventures on Tekumel, Part 2, Vol 2, and The Tékumel Bestiary, and then published the game system as Gardásiyal: Deeds of Glory in 1994.

In 2005, the Canadian publisher Guardians of Order produced Tékumel: Empire of the Petal Throne. The game uses a variation of the Tri-Stat dX system.

In 2015, James Maliszewski launched the fanzine The Excellent Travelling Volume for Empire of the Petal Throne.

== Genre ==
Empire of the Petal Throne's setting, Tékumel, used a mixture of fantasy, science fantasy and science fiction backgrounds.

== Game design ==
Empire of the Petal Throne introduced the concept of critical hits with a 20-sided die. Using these rules a player who rolls a 20 on a 20-sided die does double the normal damage, and a 20 followed by a 19 or 20 counts as a killing blow. According to M. A. R. Barker, "this simulates the 'lucky hit' on a vital organ".

== Reception ==
Rick Mataka reviewed Empire of the Petal Throne in The Space Gamer No. 4 (1976). Mataka commented that "So, if you have enjoyed Dungeons and Dragons in the past, then this is the game of the future. Empire of the Petal Throne is the 'now' game for all fantasy gamers."

In the 1980 book The Complete Book of Wargames, game designer Jon Freeman found that "[T]his game is incredibly detailed, well thought out, and self-consistent. Although it uses the same basic framework as Dungeons & Dragons, the framework is better presented and put together." Noting that the game was a creation of M. A. R. Barker, Freeman believed "That is both a strength and a weakness: an adventurer can experience something more novel and bizarre than is usually the case in the somewhat predictable fantasy version of the Middle Ages, but there is probably no one other than Barker who can adequately run a campaign." Freeman concluded by giving the game an Overall Evaluation of "fair game but overpriced."

In Issue 21 of the Australian game magazine Breakout!, Nick Hills noted the similarities between this game and Dungeons & Dragons, but felt it was not always a good thing. "At times, the imposition of the D&D game system on Prof. Barker's original ideas is a bit painful." Hills also questioned the experience point system, pointing out, "The experience system isn't quite 'right' either. Improvements in prowess depend too heavily on finding large caches of gold Kaitars, and not enough on practising and using a character's ability." But Hill admitted he was merely nit-picking, concluding, "The game is so much fun, so involving, a referee is prepared to smooth out any rough points. If there is a good referee, the players don't even have to be aware of any rough points."

In his 1990 book The Complete Guide to Role-Playing Games, game critic Rick Swan thought this game "has less value as a game than as a sourcebook ... As a generic fantasy setting, Empire is without peer, a richly developed, exhaustively detailed treatment of a truly alien setting." He also warned "Empire of the Petal Throne is not for beginners, and even experienced referees may have trouble negotiating Professor Barker's dense, scholarly text." Swan concluded by giving this game a rating of 3 out of 4, saying, "The role-playing rules don't amount to much, but the sourcebook material ranks among the hobby's best."

James Davis Nicoll in 2020 for Black Gate said "one of or possibly the first complex, non-faux Medieval European settings for an RPG. Professor Muhammad Abd-al-Rahman Barker's world of Tekumel predated roleplaying games by decades. The synergy between a complete game world and early RPGs was obvious; as a result TSR was one of many, many companies to try their hand at publishing it. While it had (and has) its avid fanbase, the game never caught on in a big way."

In his 2023 book Monsters, Aliens, and Holes in the Ground, RPG historian Stu Horvath explicitly excluded this game from his timeline of RPG history due to the 2022 revelation regarding Barker's past, stating "I'm not interested in having the work of a neo-Nazi propagandist on my shelves, and I am certainly not going to give space to one in my book."

== Other reviews and commentary ==
- Computer and Video Games #78
