= David R. Megarry =

North American game designer

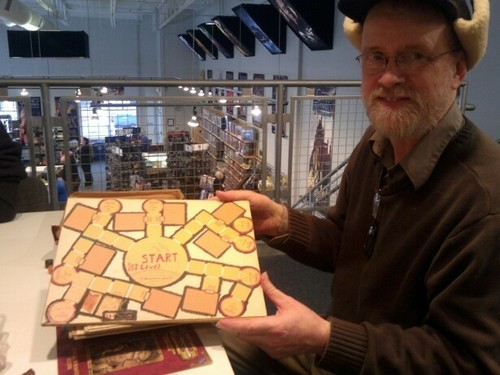
- Megarry holding his original Dungeon! play-test game.
- Occupation: Game designer

David R. Megarry is a game designer most notable for the board game Dungeon!.

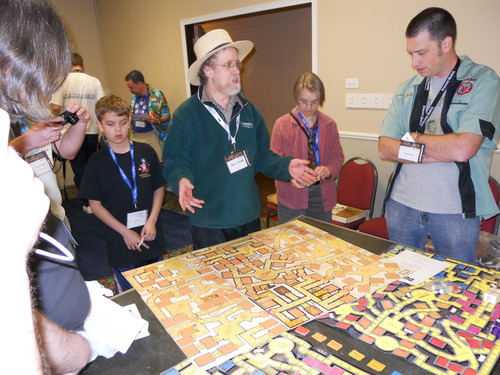
Megarry hosting a Dungeon! event

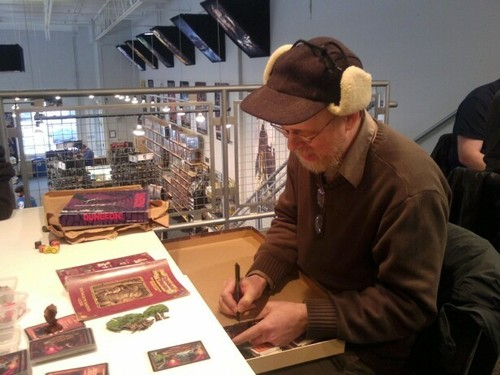
Dave autographing a copy of The New Dungeon!

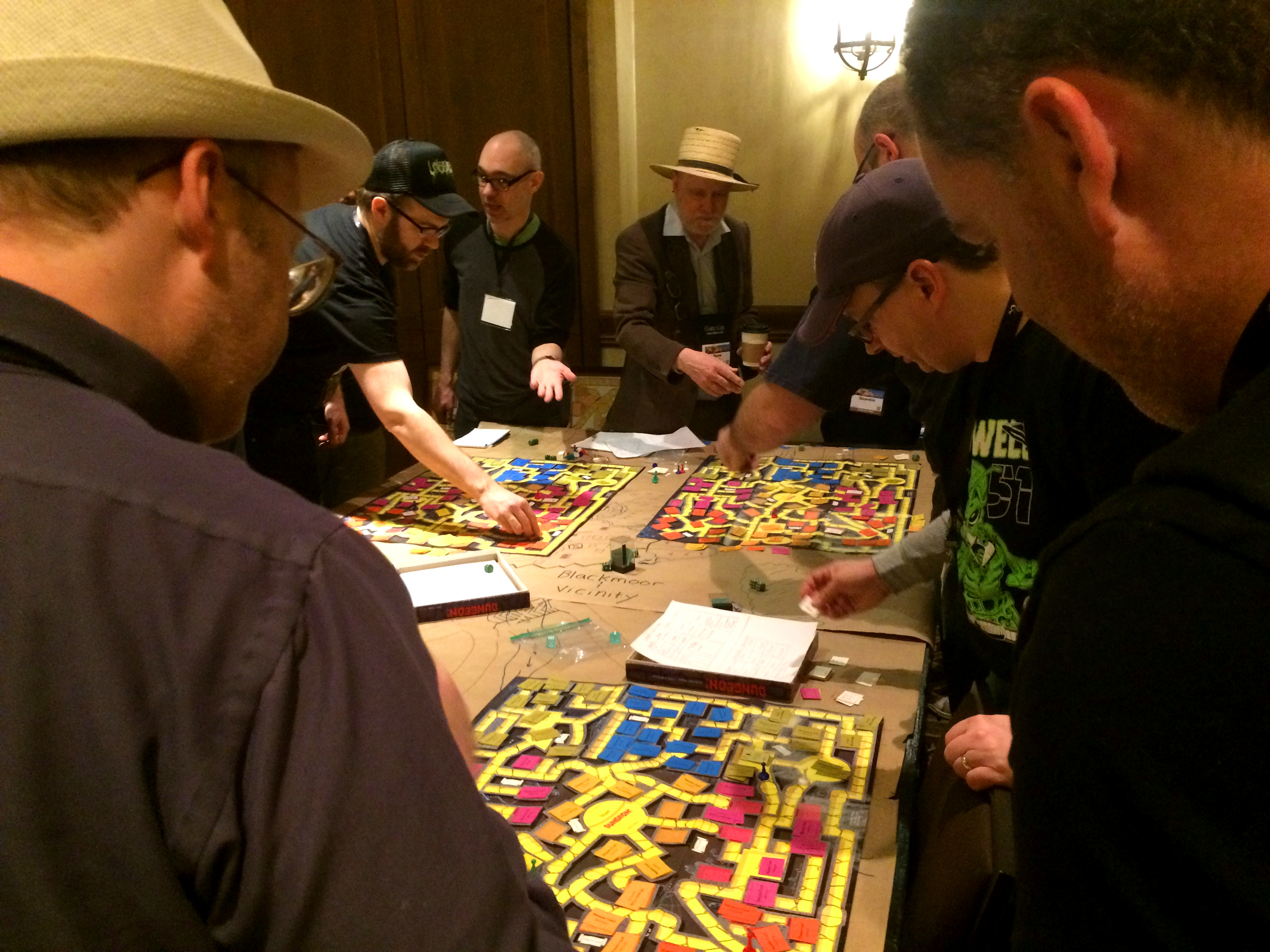
Megarry leading a session of Dungeon! at Gary Con, on Dave Arneson's ping pong table

== Career ==
=== Early gaming and Blackmoor ===
David Megarry was a member of the Midwest Military Simulation Association (MMSA), along with others including Dave Arneson, David Wesely, Ken Fletcher, John and Richard Snider. Megarry was also a member the original Twin Cities Blackmoor group run by Dave Arneson.

Megarry has brought to light Blackmoor gaming materials used in the early days of the game. These include regional maps, dungeon maps, and character matrices. The Blackmoor character matrices start in 1971, and cover approximately 20 characters played over time. The various attributes include Brains, Leadership, Courage, Health, Woodcraft, Horsemanship, Sailing, etc. They also include some history about each character, including the character's death. Megarry has described the character sheets as a "moving history."

The first column, McDuck, was the only entry when I started this sheet. As characters died, I would create a new one. These sheets represent 2+ years of gaming.

=== Development of Dungeon! ===
In October 1972 David Megarry designed a board game (which would ultimately be called Dungeon!) with the desire to capture his experience as a player in Dave Arneson's Blackmoor dungeon without the need of a game referee. Megarry hoped to relieve pressure on Arneson who complained of being overwhelmed as the only game master in the popular campaign. Megarry took the underworld component of Blackmoor and turned it into a dungeon exploration board game with randomly-selected monsters and treasure.

The earliest prototype dungeon board was preserved by Megarry, but the instructions are missing. The earliest complete version of this game was called The Dungeons of Pasha Cada. The Dungeons of Pasha Cada was preserved by a friend who received a hand-made copy in 1973. This version of the game includes 30 monsters, and the player characters are the standard Hero, Superhero, Wizard, and Elf.

Historians have linked the Dungeon! combat results table to Table T, in Charles Totten's 1880 book on military wargaming, Strategos, which was widely read and used by MMSA members. Table T was commonly implemented in Twin Cities Strategos-based games such as Strategos N.

=== Publication of Dungeon! ===
After developing the game, Megarry contacted Parker Brothers to see if they had interest in the game, but received a rejection letter. Also in 1972, Gary Gygax expressed an interest in Blackmoor and the dungeon board game, and invited Arneson and Megarry to Lake Geneva, Wisconsin, to demonstrate their games.

Dave Arneson and Dave Megarry traveled to Lake Geneva to meet with Gary Gygax, to provide a demonstration of their games. While meeting at Gygax's house, Dave Arneson ran the Lake Geneva gamers through their first session of Blackmoor. Rob Kuntz describes Dave Arneson as the referee, and the Lake Geneva players as being Gary Gygax, Ernie Gygax, Terry Kuntz, and himself. Kuntz describes Dave Megarry as the de facto leader of the group, as he understood the Blackmoor game and campaign world.

Gary, myself and a few other local wargamers were the first "lucky" fellows from Lake Geneva to experience the rigors of Blackmoor. This idea caught on deeply with Gary after an exciting adventure in which our party of heroes fought a troll, were fireballed by a magic-user, then fled to the outdoors (being chased by the Magic-user and his minions), fought four (gulp!) Balrogs, followed a map to sixteen ogres and destroyed them with a wish from a sword we had procured from the hapless troll earlier.

After Megarry showed his board game to Gygax, they continued to correspond about it. In 1973 they presented The Dungeons of Pasha Cada to various manufacturers, including Don Lowry of Guidon Games. Lowry was concerned that the dungeon maps would be too expensive to print. The game would eventually be published by TSR Hobbies as Dungeon! in 1975.

=== Work at TSR ===
Dave Megarry was hired by TSR in 1975, the same year they published his Dungeon! board game.

Megarry called Bill Owen of Judges Guild to negotiate a formal license from September 4 – November 22, 1976; this agreement required Judges Guild to pay a royalty to TSR for the right to place text on the cover of most products saying "Approved for use with Dungeons & Dragons".

Arneson left TSR in 1976 due to creative differences, and Megarry left around the same time.

=== Influence ===
Knucklebones magazine identified Megarry's Dungeon! as the first game in the genre of adventure board games.
