= DA3 =

DA3 may refer to:

- DA postcode area (Dartford postcode area), a group of postal codes in England
- 3/15 DA-3 Wartburg, a BMW car model
- Davis DA-3, an undeveloped light aircraft
- Wright R-3350-DA3, an aircraft engine
- (9944) 1990 DA3, a minor planet
- (52460) 1995 DA3, a minor planet
- DA3, a model of Honda Integra
- DA3, a Eurofighter Typhoon variant
- DA3, a module code for the Dungeons & Dungeons adventure City of the Gods
- Dragon Age: Inquisition, a 2014 video game
