= DA2 =

DA2 may refer to:

- (15836) 1995 DA2, a trans-Neptunian object
- 3/15 DA-2, a BMW car model
- DA postcode area (Dartford postcode area), a group of postal codes in England
- Davis DA-2, a light aircraft
- DA2, a model of Honda Integra
- DA2, a Eurofighter Typhoon variant
- DA2, a module code for the Dungeons & Dungeons adventure Temple of the Frog
- Dethalbum II, an album by Dethklok
- Dragon Age II, a 2011 video game by Bioware
