= Braunstein (game) =

Tabletop wargame developed by David Wesely

Braunstein is an experimental game and game genre introduced by David Wesely, a member of the Midwest Military Simulation Association, in the late 1960s, and originally played in the Twin Cities. Braunstein was important and influential in the early history of role-playing games.

== Origins ==
=== Braunstein 1 ===
In 1969, David Wesely served as referee for a Napoleonic wargame set in the fictional German town of Braunstein. Wesely set up a multi-player, multi-objective game, in which he assigned individual roles for each player, including non-military roles. For example, he had players acting as town mayor, banker, and university chancellor. Nearly 20 players showed up for the game, which was more than anticipated, and each player was assigned a role in the town of Braunstein. The players were originally supposed to communicate with the referee in a separate room.

Unexpectedly, the players began using their characters to talk to one another, and traveled around the town of Braunstein. When two players unexpectedly challenged each other to a duel, Wesely found it necessary to improvise rules for the encounter on the spot. Though Wesely thought the results were chaotic and the experiment a failure, the other players enjoyed the role playing aspect and asked him to run another game.

=== Braunstein 2-4 ===
Wesely subsequently invented a new role playing scenario in which players attempt to stage or avert a coup in a small Latin American republic – the perpetually unstable nation of Banania. He and Dave Arneson, another member of the MMSA, took turns acting as the referee for repeated stagings of this scenario, which was also known as a 'Braunstein'; Arneson took over as referee after Wesely left for service in the Army.

== Inspirations ==
Wesely's Braunstein drew inspiration from Diplomacy, a game requiring players to negotiate in between turns. The idea of a referee was derived from Strategos: The American Game of War (1880), by Charles Totten. Totten's book also inspired Wesely with the idea of playing with a game master who would create the scenario for the battle used in the game. Wesely discovered the idea of "n-player" strategy games from The Compleat Strategist (1954) by J.D. Williams. Wesely also read and cited as influential, Conflict and Defense: A General Theory (1962), by Kenneth E. Boulding.

== Influence ==
=== Role-playing games ===
Braunstein contributed to the development of role-playing games by introducing a one-to-one identification of player and character, and open-ended rules allowing the players to attempt any action, with the result of the action determined by the referee.

The role-playing game concepts Wesely introduced were further developed by Duane Jenkins in his old west "Brownstone" setting and by Dave Arneson in his Blackmoor setting and later in the Dungeons & Dragons game to which Arneson was a contributing author.

=== Brownstone ===
In October 1970, Wesely, who had enrolled in Army ROTC at the University of Kansas, was commissioned 2nd Lieutenant and ordered to active duty. Arneson continued to run Braunstein and invent new scenarios. Duane Jenkins, another gamer in the MMSA, created a series of "wild west Braunsteins" set in "Brownstone Texas" in which Arneson played the recurring role of a Mexican bandit leader named "El Pauncho".

The "Brownstone" games introduced the concept of giving the players their own "player characters" with a history that they could develop from game to game, rather than starting over each time the game was played. In those early Braunsteins the setting was replayed with the events of the previous games having been part of the current game's history. With Brownstown, the city had been so wrecked by the players actions in the previous game they created a new city but with the same characters, thus creating the first role-playing campaign.

=== Blackmoor ===
In 1971, Arneson developed a Braunstein set in a fantasy world called "The Northern Marches" including the "Barony of Blackmoor". For this campaign he brought together ideas from such disparate sources as The Lord of the Rings novels and the Dark Shadows horror soap opera. Arneson initially described his Blackmoor game as a "medieval Braunstein," featuring "mythical creatures."

In a 1981 interview published in Pegasus magazine, Dave Arneson described Wesely's Braunstein as a game in which each player had a "role" that they were playing. He also described his Blackmoor game as a variation of Dave Wesely's earlier Braunstein, based on Wesely's ideas about role-playing, but set in a fantasy world. Unlike the original Braunstein scenarios, the Blackmoor game and setting were meant for campaign play with an endless series of progressions. Peterson cites Arneson's Blackmoor game as being the most significant precursor to Dungeons & Dragons.

In this precursor to Dungeons & Dragons, players' recurring characters adventured in the fantasy setting of the Barony of Blackmoor, including exploring the monster and treasure filled dungeons underneath "Castle Blackmoor", which was inspired by a plastic model kit of Branzoll Castle in Italy.
