= Nîn-Gonost =

The logo of Nîn-Gonost

Nîn-Gonost is a fantasy adventure board game published by Fantastic Forges Inc, a Canadian game company. The game features a modular, magnetic game board. The game's name means "Fortress of Tears" in the setting's antique elvish language. The designers include Alain Henner and Arnaud Borne.

== Gameplay ==
Each player gets a certain number of miniatures, with a limit on the total "value" of each player's miniatures determined by the players before a game. A total value of 150 per player is typical. Each miniature has a corresponding "character card" with statistics about that character.

The game is played on a modular magnetic "dungeon board" with Tiles of various sizes representing floor, wall, and obstacles can be snapped together. The design of the dungeon is important, as line-of-sight, cover, and position affect combat.

Nîn-Gonost is a turn-based game. Each player goes through each of their miniatures, using the action points available to them.

=== Movement ===
A character has a specific run and walk speed, as stated on their character card. A character can run or walk up to that many squares on the board in the direction that they are facing using one action point. In the original basic rules, a character must start and end their movement at walk speed. In order to run, the character must have already spent one action point walking, and then must spend one action point "slowing down" (walking again).

=== Melee Combat ===
In the basic rules Nîn-Gonost, there are no hit points. If a character takes more damage than their resistance, the character dies. In the advanced rules, Manna and Hit Points are the same thing.

First, "fight modifiers" are determined. Examples include: For each extra opponent, a character earns (-1); if the character is being attacked from behind, they earn (-1); if a character is attacking from behind, they earn (+1). The fight modifiers change the dice a player uses. For example, a character that would use a red fight die according to their character card would use a yellow die if they were attacking from behind.

Next, each character rolls their "Duel Dice" and the "Fate Die." The player with the higher score on the "Duel Dice" is the winner. The consequences, however, depend on the "Fate Die." Each player has a 1/6 chance of rolling Fate, resulting in one of the following using the basic rules:

- Winner rolled Fate: Perfect Strike (instant kill)
- Loser rolled Fate: Perfect Block (no damage taken)
- Tie and both rolled Fate: Both die
- Tie and neither rolled Fate: Neither is harmed
- Not a tie, and both or neither rolled Fate: Damage is resolved

Adiken's official Core Rules by Paul DeStefano released after the initial boxed set introduced CounterStrike as a possible combat outcome as well as many rule enhancements.

If the damage needs to be resolved, per the last case, the difference of the scores on the "Duel Dice" plus the winner's "Damage" score (on the "character card") is the damage dealt. If the damage dealt is greater than the loser's "Resistance" score (also on the card), then the loser is killed. Otherwise, the loser is unharmed.

Once two characters begin fighting, they must continue fighting as long as they have action points available to do so, or until one disengages by stepping back (at a cost of one action point).

=== Ranged Combat ===
Ranged combat is similar to melee combat. An attacking player calculates "shooting modifiers": a short range or a large target gets +1; a long range, target behind cover, target with a shield, or target engaged in a fight all garner -1. It is possible to get up to +2 by spending that many attack points on "concentration." The damage done is the difference between how much an attacking player rolls on an "Accuracy Die," and the state of the "Fate Die." The target rolls just the "Fate Die." One of the following states is possible:

- If the broken arrow on the "Accuracy Die" is rolled, the attacker has missed.
- If the attacker rolled Fate, it is a "Perfect Shot" and the target is instantly killed.
- If the target rolled Fate, he is unharmed.
- If both or neither player rolled Fate, damage is resolved per below.
- If the attacker rolled Fate and a broken arrow, it is considered a "Critical Failure" and he has broken his bowstring. He must have to spend four action points to repair it.

To resolve damage, the damage on the "Range" portion of a miniature's character card is the character's ranged damage. The score on the Accuracy Die plus the ranged damage is the "Strike Power." If that number is greater than the target's resistance, the character is killed. If not, the target is undamaged.

=== Advanced play ===
In addition to the basic guidelines defined above, each character has additional statistics. They include manna, strength, con, dexterity, per, wil, ctr, wtg, and specific armor and weapon statistics.

=== The Revised Rules ===
In 2005, American game designer Paul DeStefano joined Adiken and created the wholly revamped Core Rules. These rules corrected numerous errors in the original game which were the result of both poor translations and poor playtesting. The new Core Rules streamlined play tremendously, removing the need for most record keeping, enhancing gameplay and revamping the magic system.

Overall, the new rules created a far superior game which was nominated for an Origins award for best miniatures rules. However, the company would not last long enough to release the many planned expansions.

=== Comment from the Authors ===
The Game Nin-Gonost was nominated for an Origins award for best miniatures game and not miniatures rules in 2005, months before any collaboration with freelancers.
