= MMSA =

MMSA may refer to:

- Malta Medical Students' Association, a student association in the University of Malta
- Master of Midwifery of the Society of Apothecaries, a qualification introduced in 1928
- Mercantile Marine Service Association, a trade union 1857–1899, precursor of Nautilus International
- Midwest Military Simulation Association, an American group of wargamers
