= Adventure board game =

Genre of board game

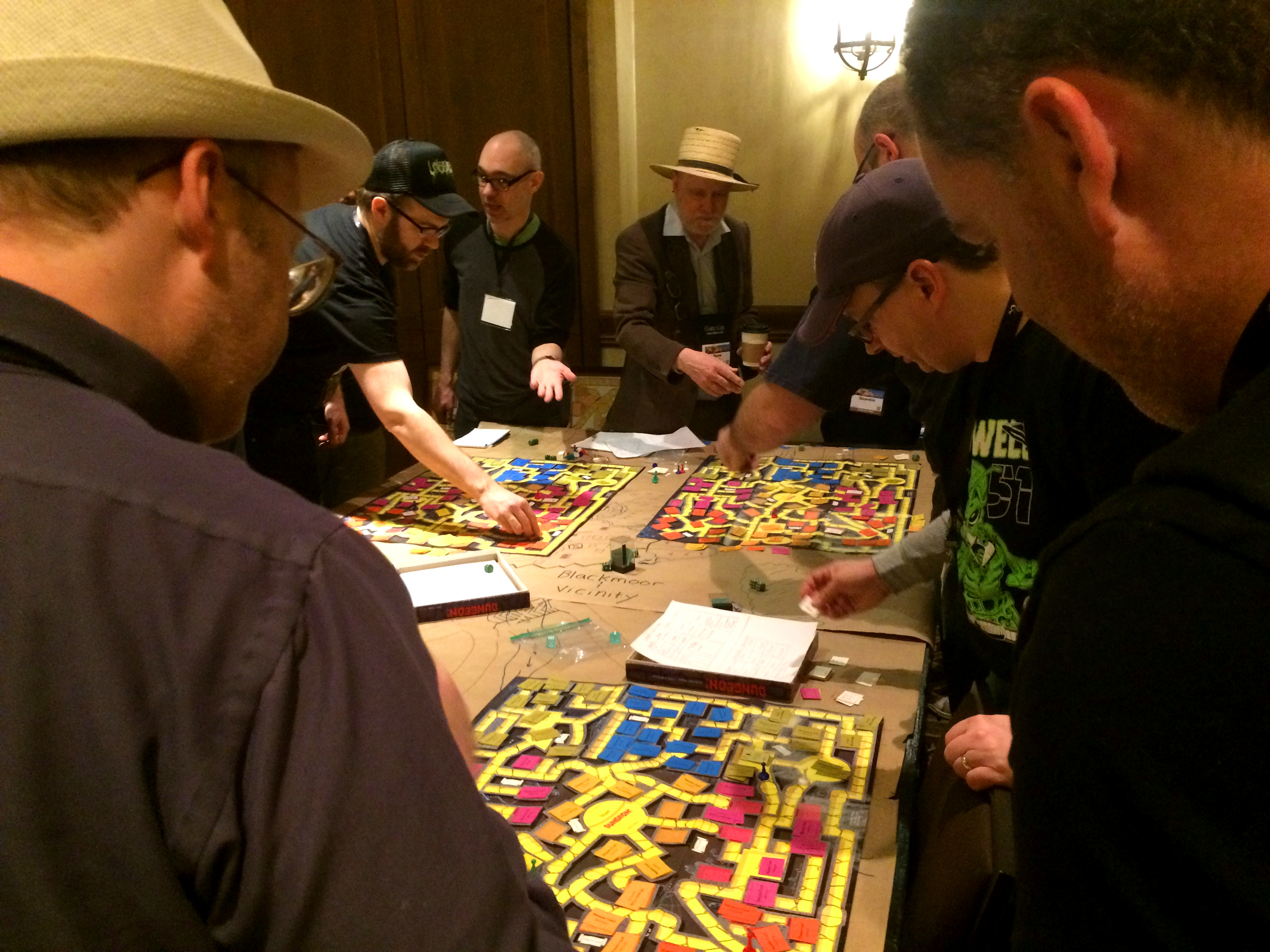
David R. Megarry leading a session of Dungeon! at Gary Con

An adventure board game is a board game in which a player plays as a unique individual character that improves through gameplay. This improvement is commonly reflected in terms of increasing character attributes, but also in receiving new abilities or equipment.

== History ==
=== 1970s ===
Adventure board games often integrate various role-playing game mechanics, such as experience points and character creation into the board game format. The origins of these two types of game are related. In the early 1970s, Dave Arneson introduced his role-playing game, Blackmoor, to a group of players. One of those players, Gary Gygax, collaborated with Arneson to create Dungeons & Dragons (1974). Another member of that gaming group, Dave Megarry, translated the experience into the board game, Dungeon! (1975), the first adventure board game. In fact, the term "adventure gaming" in the 1970s referred to what later became known as tabletop role-playing games, and only later became associated with board games.

=== 1980s ===
The genre saw a particular boom in the 1980s, when its key subgenres had been codified by three major releases of the decade:

- Competitive fantasy adventure games, codified by Dungeon! and particularly Games Workshop's Talisman (1983),
- Cooperative investigative adventure games, pioneered by Chaosium's Arkham Horror (1987), and
- Cooperative fantasy adventure games, a combination of the other two directions, first produced in GW and Milton Bradley Company's HeroQuest (1989).

=== 1990s ===
In the 1990s, both adventure board games and tabletop RPGs saw a sharp decline in popularity in the wake of the collectible card game boom and bust.

=== 2000s ===
Fantasy Flight Games has brought all three subgenres back into the market with their Runebound (2004), the second edition of Arkham Horror (2005), and Descent: Journeys in the Dark (2006), respectively. Other companies published their own takes on the genre, such as Atlas Games' card-based Dungeoneer (2003) and Pegasus Spiele's Return of the Heroes (2003), which was one of the earliest examples of the genre to employ eurogame mechanics — something Fantasy Flight Games also embraced in their own later games.

=== 2010s ===
In the 2010s, the adventure board game genre returned to its roots when Wizards of the Coast, the new owners of the Dungeons & Dragons IP, began publishing their own cooperative fantasy adventure games based on the fourth edition of D&D: Castle Ravenloft (2010), Wrath of Ashardalon (2011), The Legend of Drizzt (2011), etc.
