= Davis DA-6 =

American light aircraft

General information
- Type: Civil Utility Aircraft
- National origin: United States
- Manufacturer: Davis Aircraft Corp.
- Designer: Leeon D. Davis
- Number built: 1

History
- Introduction date: 1981
- First flight: 1981
- Developed from: Davis DA-2

The Davis DA-6 is a prototype V-tailed, low wing, four-place aircraft. The aircraft was based on the Davis DA-2 design with an extended "greenhouse" glass cabin.

== Development ==
The prototype aircraft was built in Stanton, Texas and intended to be certified with a Lycoming O-320 engine. Even though the aircraft was based on a homebuilt design, it was intended to be eventually certified.

== Design ==
The aircraft has a unique feature, a small 6" long airfoil under the V-tail used as a "flying trim tab".

== Operational history ==
The prototype was displayed at both the EAA Convention and the Kerrville, Texas fly-in in 1981.

== Specifications Davis DA-6 ==
Data from Leeon Davis Aircraft

General characteristics

- Crew: 1
- Capacity: 3
- Wingspan: 22 ft (6.7 m)
- Airfoil: USA 35B
- Empty weight: 850 lb (386 kg)
- Gross weight: 1,580 lb (717 kg)
- Powerplant: 1 × Lycoming O-235 four cylinder piston aircraft engine

Performance
