= David J. Ritchie =

American game designer (1950–2009)

- Born: October 6, 1950
- Died: September 6, 2009 (aged 58); Connecticut, US
- Occupation: Game designer

David James Ritchie (October 6, 1950 – September 6, 2009) was a game designer and author.

== Early life and education ==
David Ritchie was a Canton, Ohio native who graduated from Lehman High School in Canton and then went to Grove City College in Pennsylvania where he met Deborah, who he later married.

== Career ==
David Ritchie was working for Simulations Publications, Inc. (SPI) when it was taken over by TSR in March 1982. In the following months, as SPI employees either quit or were fired, Ritchie became the last remaining holdover from SPI. He designed The Omega War in his final months at SPI, before leaving in late 1983 to work for Coleco. Ritchie, along with Jon Pickens, David "Zeb" Cook, Harold Johnson, Rick Swan, and Ed Carmien, co-wrote the adventure module OA2 Night of the Seven Swords. Ritchie and Dave Arneson wrote a series of four adventures that further detailed the world of Blackmoor which Arneson had created, and they were published by TSR as DA1: Adventures in Blackmoor (1986), DA2: Temple of the Frog (1986), DA3: City of the Gods (1987) and DA4: The Duchy of Ten (1987).

Ritchie wrote the 1991 book Connecticut: Off the Beaten Path with his wife, Deborah.

Ritchie died in his Connecticut home on September 6, 2009, at the age of 58.
