= Strategos (game) =

19th century U.S. military wargame

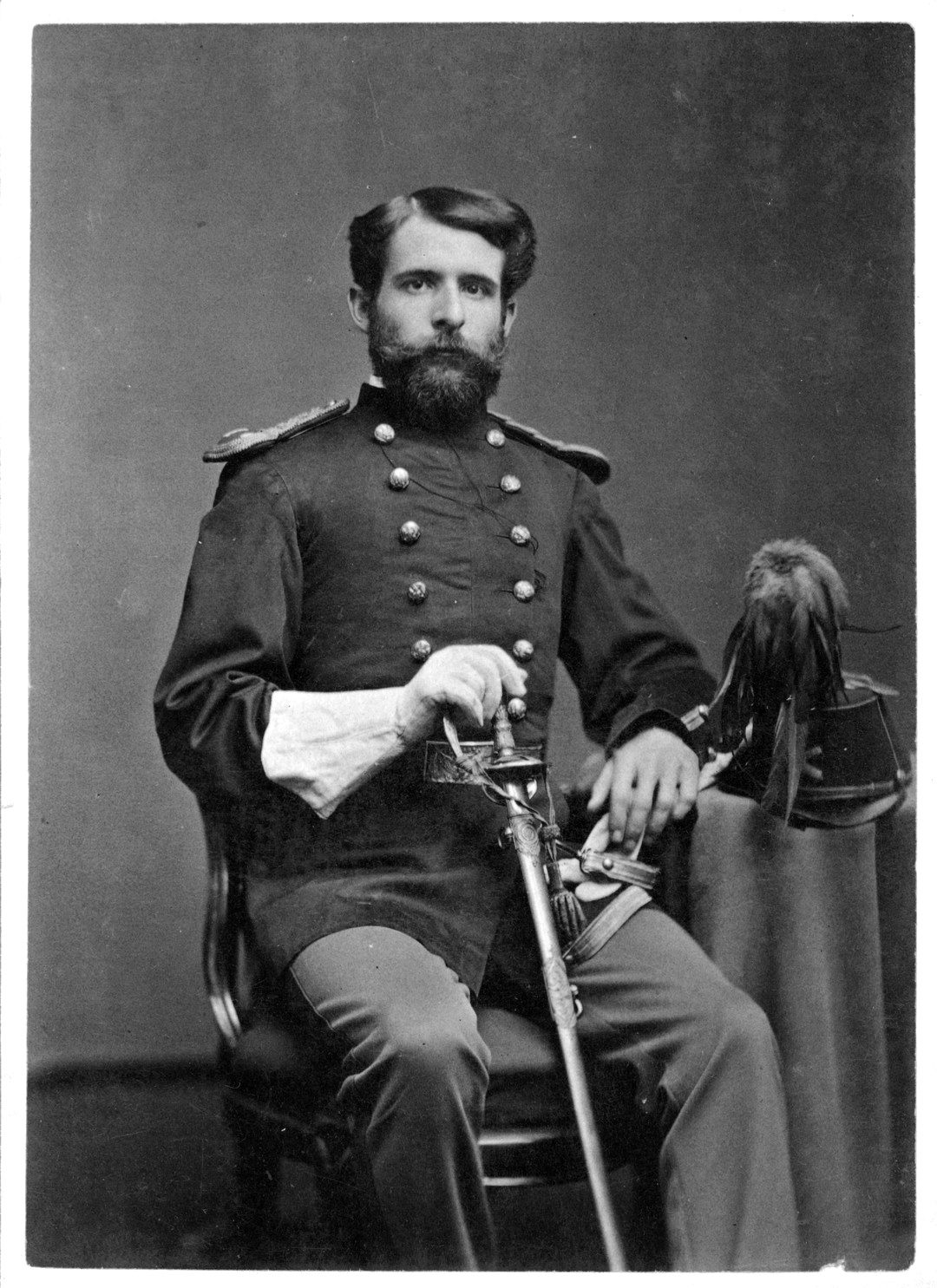
Charles A. L. Totten, ca. 1875

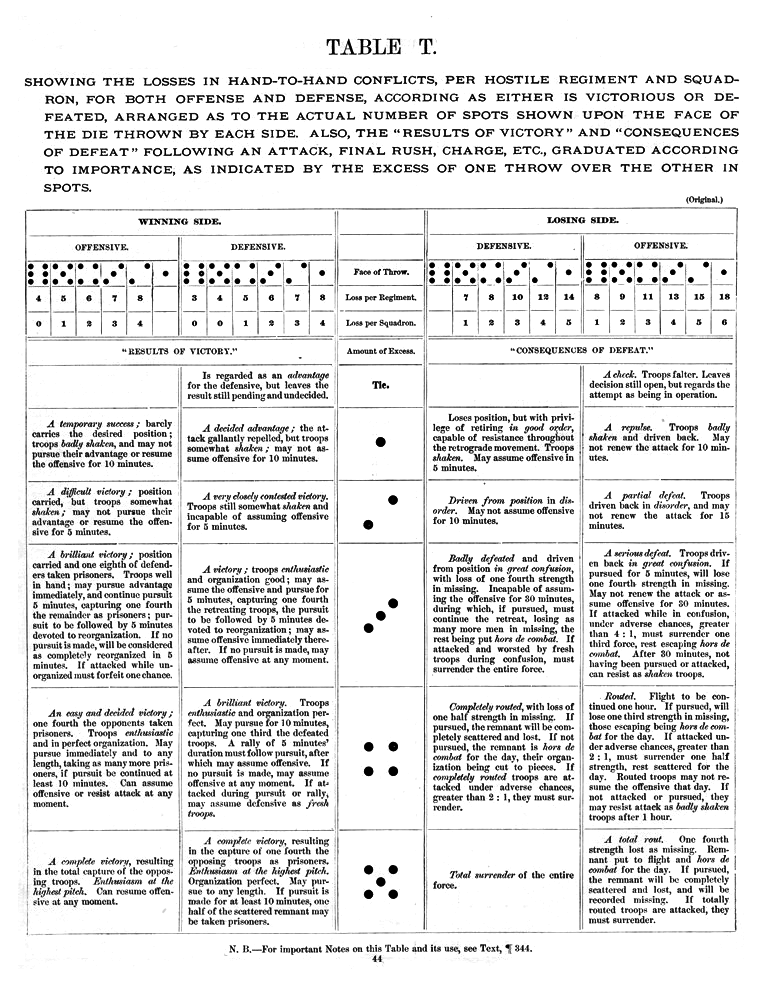
Strategos (1880), Table T, used for combat resolution

Strategos is a military wargame developed by Charles A. L. Totten for the United States Army, and published in 1880.

== History ==
Jon Peterson identifies Strategos as being largely descended from the Prussian Kriegsspiel, and its translations, that had made their way into the hands of British military officers in the 1870s.

Strategos was meant to be a training tool at various levels, starting with introductory scenarios and working toward more complex and advanced ones. This was contrasted with other forms of kriegsspiel which were cast as being primarily for those in elite military leadership. An article in the Army and Navy Journal, from November 25, 1882, describes the role and function of the Strategos game in contrast to William R. Livermore's publication of a more traditional wargame, The American Kriegsspiel (1882), as follows:

We have offered to us two American games — those of Messrs. Totten and Livermore. Mr. Totten's has the advantage of priority of publication, and is claimed to be based on military principles and to be an assistant both to the young and old student, that by its means one can wheel a set of fours and manoeuvre a great army. The War Department, by issuing the book to companies, inferentially approves it.

Strategos consists of two different games. The Battle Game was played on a board, whereas the Advanced Game was played on maps and miniature terrain.

In Strategos, Totten leans toward the "free" kriegsspiel movement in allowing the referee discretion in matters not covered by the normal game rules. Peterson identifies the free kriegsspiel movement with Klemens Wilhelm Jacob Meckel's work Studien über das Kriegsspiel, along with other Prussian authors of the 1870s and later.

== Gameplay ==
=== Battle Game ===
The Battle Game owes more of its heritage to chess, and resembles the wargame of Johann Christian Ludwig Hellwig.

=== Advanced Game ===
The Advanced Game relies on the referee to provide a scenario to the two sides, which are colored red and blue. Orders are provided in writing, and three topographic maps may be used: one for the referee, and one for each side. The referee map is the master copy with all information, whereas the player maps show only what is known to the respective side. Blocks are used for troop formations, and are scaled to the size of those formations on the topographic maps.

When there are conflicts in the game, the referee calculates probabilities, and then dice and tables are used to determine the outcomes. In more traditional kriegsspiel games, the referee would roll all the dice privately, and provide the relevant battlefield report. However, in Totten's Strategos, the players roll the dice openly and consult the necessary table, such as Table T, for combat resolution.

== Revival ==
While Strategos was reiterating common practices and trends in 19th century wargaming, these systems largely fell into obscurity in the 20th century. In 1967, Strategos was rediscovered by David Wesely at the University of Minnesota library. An avid hobby wargamer and reader of wargaming literature, Wesely seized upon these rules and incorporated their principles into the miniature wargames played by the Midwest Military Simulation Association (MMSA). These included the role of the referee, and the principle of free kriegsspiel that players could attempt anything, although not always successfully, and that the referee should be able to make judgements to cover anything not ordinarily covered by the rules. Totten's Strategos became the cornerstone text for the Twin Cities gamers. The incorporation of Totten's Strategos into MMSA wargaming culminated with the 1968 development of Strategos N, a compact set of Napoleonic wargaming rules devised by Wesely and other MMSA members. These rules were eventually published in 1970.

== Influence ==
Dave Wesely developed Strategos N as the first MMSA Strategos variant for the first time in 1968. It was later self-published in 1970, and again in 1984.

Dave Arneson developed Strategos RT for his Russo-Turkish wargames campaign, and the rules circulated in draft form in 1969.

Dave Wesely developed Strategos C for wargames set during the American Civil War, and it circulated in draft form in 1969, acting as a precursor to Valley Forge (1976).

Dave Arneson and Randy Hoffa developed Strategos A in 1969, for wargames set in the ancient period.

Numerous games developed by the MMSA adapted rules from Strategos, such as its Table T, for combat resolution. These games include Don't Give Up the Ship!, Dungeon!, and Valley Forge.

The concept of the referee in Totten's Strategos led to Dave Wesely expanding upon these ideas to create the Braunstein games, which were influential in the early history of role-playing games. This development of the role of the referee became a catalyst for the evolution of role-playing games.

According to some analyses, the early mass combat battles in Blackmoor, as detailed in The First Fantasy Campaign (1977), were based on Strategos rather than Chainmail.
