= Tabletop role-playing game =

Form of role-playing game for leisure

A tabletop role-playing game (TTRPG or TRPG), also known as a pen-and-paper role-playing game, is a kind of role-playing game (RPG) in which the participants describe their characters' actions through speech and sometimes movements. Participants determine the actions of their characters based on their characterization, and the actions succeed or fail according to a set formal system of rules and guidelines, usually involving randomization (such as through dice). Within the rules, players have the freedom to improvise, and their choices shape the direction and outcome of the game.

Neither pen and paper nor a table are strictly necessary for a game to count as a TTRPG; rather, the terms pen-and-paper and tabletop are typically used to distinguish this format of RPG from role-playing video games or live action role-playing games. Online play of TTRPGs through videoconferencing has become common since the COVID-19 pandemic.

Some common examples of tabletop role-playing games include Dungeons & Dragons, Call of Cthulhu, and Pathfinder.

== Gameplay ==
=== Overview ===
In most games, a specially designated player typically called the game master (GM) purchases or prepares a set of rules and a fictional setting in which each player acts out the role of a single character. The GM describes the game world and its inhabitants; the other players describe the intended actions of their characters, and the GM describes the outcomes. Some outcomes are determined by the game system, and some are chosen by the GM. This pattern was established by the first published role-playing game, Dungeons & Dragons, but is not universal across all tabletop RPGs.

=== Detail ===
Games are of indefinite length, from a single brief session (sometimes completed in a few hours) to a series of repeated sessions that may continue for years with an evolving cast of players and characters. Play is often episodic and mission-centric, with a series of challenges culminating in a final puzzle or enemy that must be overcome. Multiple missions played with the same characters may be related to each other in a plot arc of escalating challenges. The exact tone, structure, pace and end (if any) vary from game to game depending on the needs and preferences of the players.

During the first session, players typically create characters whose roles they will play in the game. As well as fleshing out the character's personal history and background, they assign numerical statistics to the character; these will be used later to determine the outcome of events in the game. Together, these notes tell the player about their character and said character's place in the game world. In many game systems, characters can increase their statistics during the course of the game (or over multiple games).

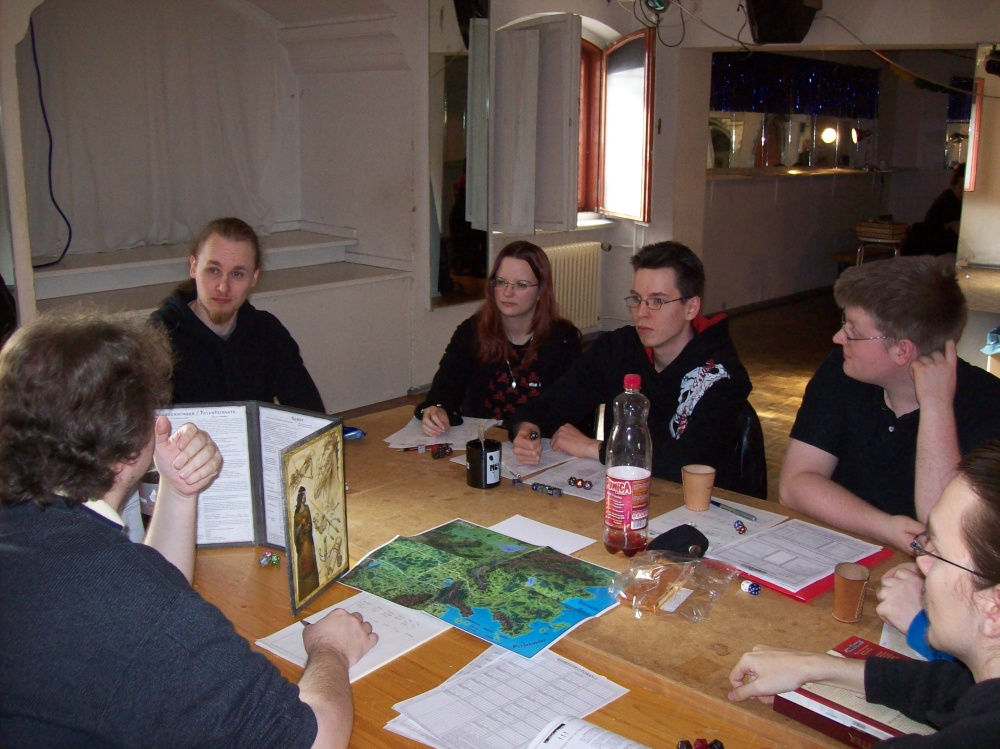
Role players at the Convention Burg-Con in Berlin 2009. The gamemaster (left) sits behind the GM's screen.

The GM then begins the game by introducing and describing the setting and the characters. Specific tabletop RPGs may have a unique name for the GM role, for examples: Dungeon Master, Referee and Storyteller. Some games, such as Polaris and Primetime Adventures, have distributed the authority of the GM to different players and to different degrees. This technique is often used to ensure that all players are involved in producing a situation that is interesting and that conflicts of interest suffered by the GM are avoided on a systemic level.

The players describe their characters' actions, and the GM responds by describing the outcome of those actions. Usually, these outcomes are determined by the setting and the GM's common sense; most actions are straightforward and immediately successful. For example, if a player has their character look around a room, the GM will describe the room; if they have their character leave, the GM will describe whatever they encounter outside the room.

The outcomes of some actions are determined by the rules of the game. For example, while looking around the room, a character may or may not notice an important object or secret doorway, depending on the character's powers of perception. Determining the outcome usually involves rolling dice and adjusting the result for the character's statistics and environmental factors to see whether the action was successful. Typically, the higher the character's score in a particular attribute, the higher their probability of success. There are alternate game systems which are diceless, or use alternate forms of randomization, such as a deck of cards or a Jenga tower.

Tabletop RPG settings includes challenges for the player characters to overcome through play, such as traps to be avoided, rulers to be courted, or adversaries to be fought. Many game sessions contain moments of puzzle solving, negotiation, chases, and combat. Frequently, this involves interacting with non-player characters, other denizens of the game world, which are played by the GM. In most games, the full details of the setting are kept secret, but some broad details of the game world are usually given to the players.

Tabletop RPGs are often conducted like radio drama: only the spoken component of a role is acted. Acting in tabletop RPGs is not always literal, and players do not always speak exclusively in-character. Instead, players act out their role by deciding and describing what actions their characters will take within the rules of the game.

== History ==
=== Early role-playing ===
Tabletop role-playing games have origins in wargaming, which has roots in ancient strategy games, particularly chess and its predecessor Chaturanga. From the late 18th century to the 19th century, chess variants evolved into modern wargames, most notably Kriegsspiel. Over a century later, David Wesely developed Braunstein, the first tabletop roleplaying game, from Strategos, and then the miniature wargame Chainmail, was released in 1971, both of which became the basis for Dungeons & Dragons.

According to RPG designer John Wick, chess can be turned into a role-playing game if chess pieces such as the king, queen, rooks, knights or pawns are given names, and decisions are made based on their motivations. According to Wick, Dungeons & Dragons was a "sophisticated, intricate and complicated combat simulation board game that people were turning into a roleplaying game" just "like giving your rook a motive" in chess.

The assumption of roles was a central theme in some early 20th century activities such as the game Jury Box, mock trials, model legislatures, and "Theatre Games". In the 1960s, historical reenactment groups such as The Sealed Knot and the Society for Creative Anachronism began to perform "creative history" reenactments introducing fantasy elements, and in the 1970s fantasy wargames were developed, inspired by sword and sorcery fiction, in which each player controlled only a single unit, or "character". The earlier role-playing tradition was combined with the wargames' rule-based character representation to form the first role-playing games.

Dungeons & Dragons, developed in 1974 by Dave Arneson and Gary Gygax and published by Gygax's company, TSR, was the first commercially available role-playing game, though at the time its first printing was marketed as a niche wargaming product. Gygax expected to sell about 50,000 copies total to a strictly hobbyist market. After establishing itself in boutique stores, it developed a strong, lasting fan base that distinguished itself from the typical wargame player base. By the time of its first major reprinting in 1977, Dungeons & Dragons was refocused as a role-playing game to segregate it from the typical wargame.

One of the first original role-playing games was M. A. R. Barker's Empire of the Petal Throne, first published in 1974, the same year as Dungeons & Dragons. It introduced the fictional world of Tékumel, influenced by Indian, Middle-Eastern, Egyptian and Meso-American mythology. It also introduced the game mechanic of critical hits. According to creator Barker, "this simulates the 'lucky hit' on a vital organ." The game influenced Arneson and Gygax, who was so impressed with it that his company TSR published Empire of the Petal Throne in 1975. TSR published Barker's game and setting as a standalone game, rather than as a "supplement" to the original D&D rules.

Another early game was Traveller, designed by Marc Miller and first published in 1977 by Game Designers' Workshop. This was originally intended to be a system for playing generic space-opera-themed science-fiction adventures (in the same sense that Dungeons & Dragons was a system for generic fantasy adventures), but an optional setting called "the Third Imperium" that was detailed in subsequent supplements became strongly identified with the game. The changes in this setting over time, especially those involving "the Fifth Frontier War" as depicted in the Journal of the Travellers Aid Society, arguably constitute the first use of metaplot in a role-playing game.

=== Mid–1980s to early 1990s: diversification of settings and systems ===
Up to this stage, each game had tied itself to a particular setting; If a player wanted to play in a science-fiction game and a fantasy game, they had to learn two game systems. Attempts were made in Advanced Dungeons & Dragons to allow cross-genre games using Gamma World (1978) and Boot Hill (1975) rules, but the obscure rules went largely unused. Meanwhile, Call of Cthulhu and Paranoia offered different role-playing experiences, in which the story arc of a group's investigation would lead to death and/or madness, or where comical infighting within a group would be expected and reinforced within the genre conventions of "a darkly humorous future". The Hero System, first introduced in Champions (1981), was also used in Justice, Inc. (1984), Fantasy Hero (1985) and other games. Steve Jackson Games followed with GURPS (the Generic Universal Roleplaying System) in 1986. At the same time, games using the fictional worlds of Star Trek, DC Heroes, the Marvel Universe or The Lord of the Rings expanded the range of possibilities for Table-top gaming. Games such as GURPS and Champions introduced character creation via point-buy systems; later, Vampire: The Masquerade and similar games emphasized storytelling, plot and character development over rules and combat.

Due to the game's success, the term Dungeons & Dragons has sometimes been used as a generic term for fantasy role-playing games. TSR undertook legal action to prevent its trademark from becoming generic. Dungeons & Dragons was a subject of controversy in the 1980s when opponents such as Patricia Pulling claimed it caused negative spiritual and psychological effects. Academic research has discredited these claims. Some educators support role-playing games as a healthy way to hone reading and arithmetic skills. Though role-playing has been generally accepted in society, the subject retains a level of controversy among some religious organizations. This belief or attitude is by no means universal among religious organizations; there are faith-based role-playing games on the market and religious role-players who disagree that these games are morally corrupt or occult in nature.

=== 1990s: decline in popularity ===
Competition from role-playing video games and collectible card games led to a decline in the tabletop role-playing game industry. The financially troubled market leader TSR, Inc., which had suffered financial setbacks from overproduction, was eventually purchased by Wizards of the Coast. To better cope with the economics of role-playing games, they introduced a new regime of open gaming, allowing other companies to publish D&D-compatible supplements.

=== 2000–2010 ===
In 2000, Wizards of the Coast's Dungeons & Dragons brand manager Ryan Dancey introduced a policy whereby other companies could publish D&D-compatible materials under the Open Gaming License (OGL). He was frustrated that game supplements suffered far more diminished sales over time than the core books required to play the game, then this would spread the cost of supplementing the game and would increase sales of the core books, which could only be published by WotC. The new D&D rules became known as the d20 system, and a System Reference Document was published, containing all the rules needed to write a supplement or run a one-off game, but lacking the character advancement rules necessary for long-term play. The open gaming movement and 3rd/3.5 edition D&D (2000, 2003) enjoyed a great deal of success, and although there was some criticism of the move, a great many d20 System games were released until around 2008.

Meanwhile, indie role-playing game communities arose on the internet, studying role-playing and developing several forms of role-playing game theory such as GNS theory. Rules innovations combined with literary techniques to develop games such as Apocalypse World, The Quiet Year, and Dogs in the Vineyard that rely on the contributions of players to enhance moral agency in a process of emergent storytelling.

=== 2010–2020 ===
In January 2012, Wizards of the Coast announced that a new edition of D&D, at the time referred to as D&D Next, was under development. In direct contrast to the previous editions of the game, D&D Next was developed partly via a public open playtest. An early build of the new edition debuted at the 2012 Dungeons & Dragons Experience event to about 500 fans. Public playtesting began on 24 May 2012, with the final playtest packet released on 20 September 2013. The 5th edition's Basic Rules, a free PDF containing complete rules for play and a subset of the player and DM content from the core rulebooks, was released on 3 July 2014. In forty years the genre grew from a few hobbyists and boutique publishers to an economically significant part of the games industry. Grass-roots and small business involvement remains substantial while larger projects have attracted several million players worldwide. Toys industry leader Hasbro purchased Wizards of the Coast in 1999 for an estimated $325 million.

With the emergence of esports, livestreamed gaming, and Let's Plays, actual plays of TTRPGs became a popular podcast and webseries format, and contributed to the resurgence of TTRPGs in the 2010s and 2020s. These include streaming shows and podcasts such as Dimension 20, Critical Role, and The Adventure Zone.

=== 2020–present: resurgence in popularity ===
Tabletop role-playing games increased in popularity in the early 2020s, facilitated by an increase in online play through video conferencing during the COVID-19 pandemic, viewership of actual play programming on streaming media such as Twitch, and the development of user-friendly marketplaces to buy and sell indie role-playing games as PDFs, such as Itch.io.

In 2023, Wizards of the Coast attempted to alter the Open Game License. When the community protested, they walked the decision back, and placed basic 5th Edition Dungeons & Dragons rules into the Creative Commons. Later that year, Dungeons and Dragons: Honor Among Thieves was released.

== Game systems ==
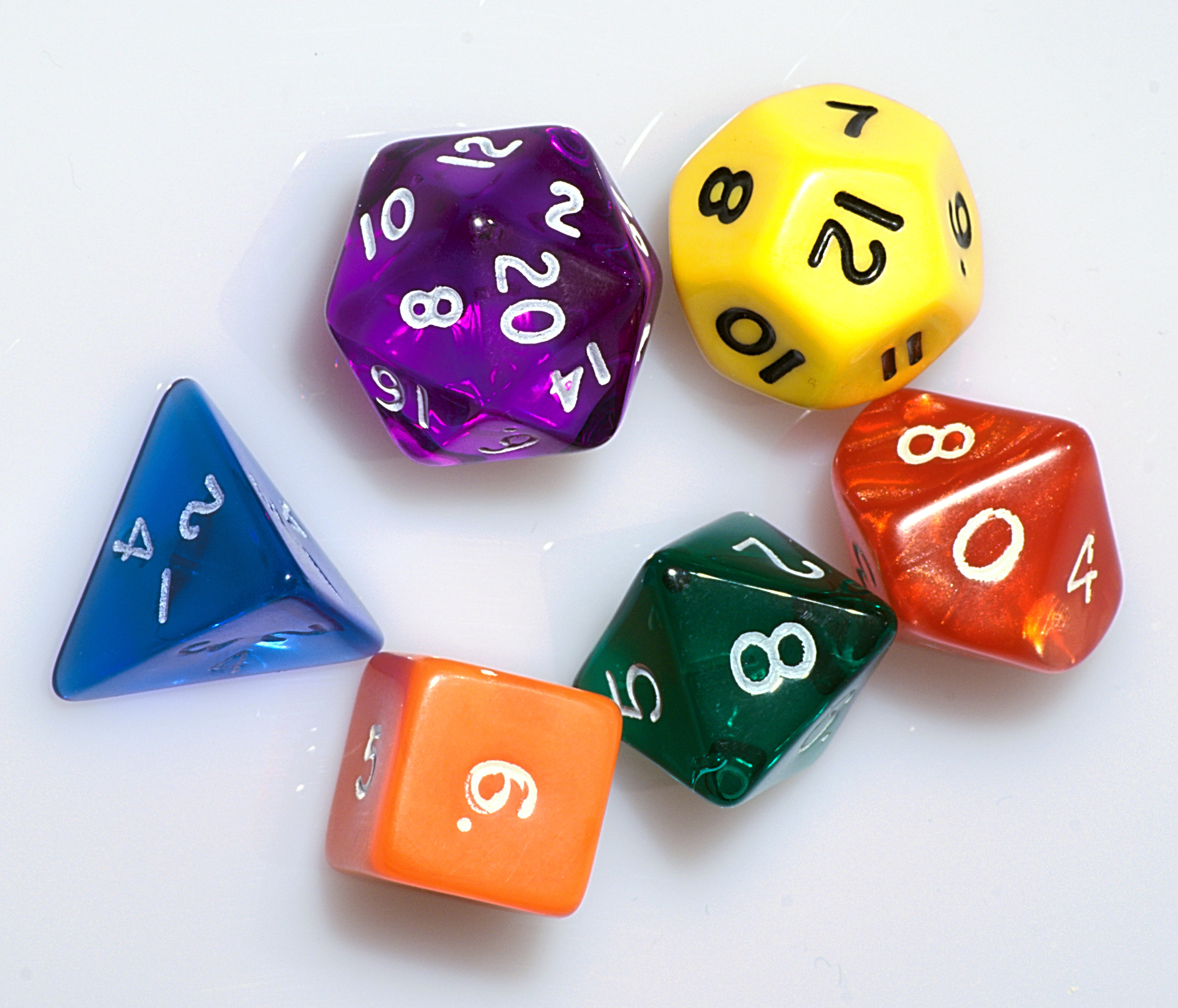
Role-playing games often use polyhedral dice to resolve game actions.

The set of rules of a role-playing game is known as its game system; the rules themselves are known as game mechanics. Although there are game systems which are shared by many games, for example, the d20 system, many games have their own, custom rules system. Game rules determine the success or failure of a character's actions, or adjudicate changes in the setting or the characters themselves. Many game systems use weighted statistics and dice rolls or other random elements. Some games offer a System Reference Document (SRD) that allows other designers to use part of the game system in their own, future game products. Some game systems emphasize the creation of a journal or other keepsake in response to prompts or other game mechanics over the course of playing the game.

=== Genres and settings ===
Some systems are designed for a particular genre. Examples include Dungeons & Dragons (fantasy), Starfinder Roleplaying Game (science fiction), Outgunned (heroic action), and Ten Candles (horror). Genre-based games often come packaged with a default setting but invite adaptation to other settings in the same genre by players and GMs. Universal role-playing game systems also exist, created with the intent of building a rule system that can be adapted to any genre. Examples include Basic Role-Playing, Champions, and GURPS. The d20 system, based on the third edition of Dungeons & Dragons, has been used in science fiction and modern-day game settings such as Spycraft and the Star Wars Roleplaying Game. In practice, most universal systems are more effective for particular settings, power levels, or types of play.

Other systems are more strongly tied to the specific setting of the game they feature in. Tabletop role-playing games that take place in existing fictional worlds have been called a form of fan fiction. Some officially licensed game systems provide templates enabling players to play as canon characters, such as the Marvel Multiverse Role-Playing Game, which includes official character sheets for Marvel heroes and villains. In 2023, Rebekah Krum of CBR commented that "such games have existed nearly as long as the industry itself, cropping up as the result of marketing campaigns or attempts to capitalize on existing hype, but they've never been more popular than they are now". She highlighted that this includes Dungeons & Dragons setting books for actual play shows like Acquisitions Incorporated and Critical Role, just as "Fate sourcebooks set in the world of The Dresden Files. Many are collaborations between well-known game developers and the creators of the original tales or experts on them, such as The Witcher Tabletop Roleplaying Game from R. Talsorian Games, Avatar Legends from Magpie Games, and several titles from Modiphius, including Star Trek Adventures".

=== Character creation ===
Before play begins, players build or select a character. This can take one of several forms:

- Selecting from a number of pre-set templates or playbooks, created by the game's developer or by the GM. Feng Shui and many Powered by the Apocalypse games use this method.
- Building a character using a set of broad options, such as class and species (called "race" in some older games, including D&D prior to 5e 2024). This approach is particularly common in fantasy games, such as Dungeons & Dragons and Pathfinder.
- Point-buy systems, often used in universal RPGs such as Champions, and GURPS, assigns the player a certain number of points with which to purchase statistics for the character. The cost of each statistic varies depending on its presumed effectiveness.

=== Statistics ===
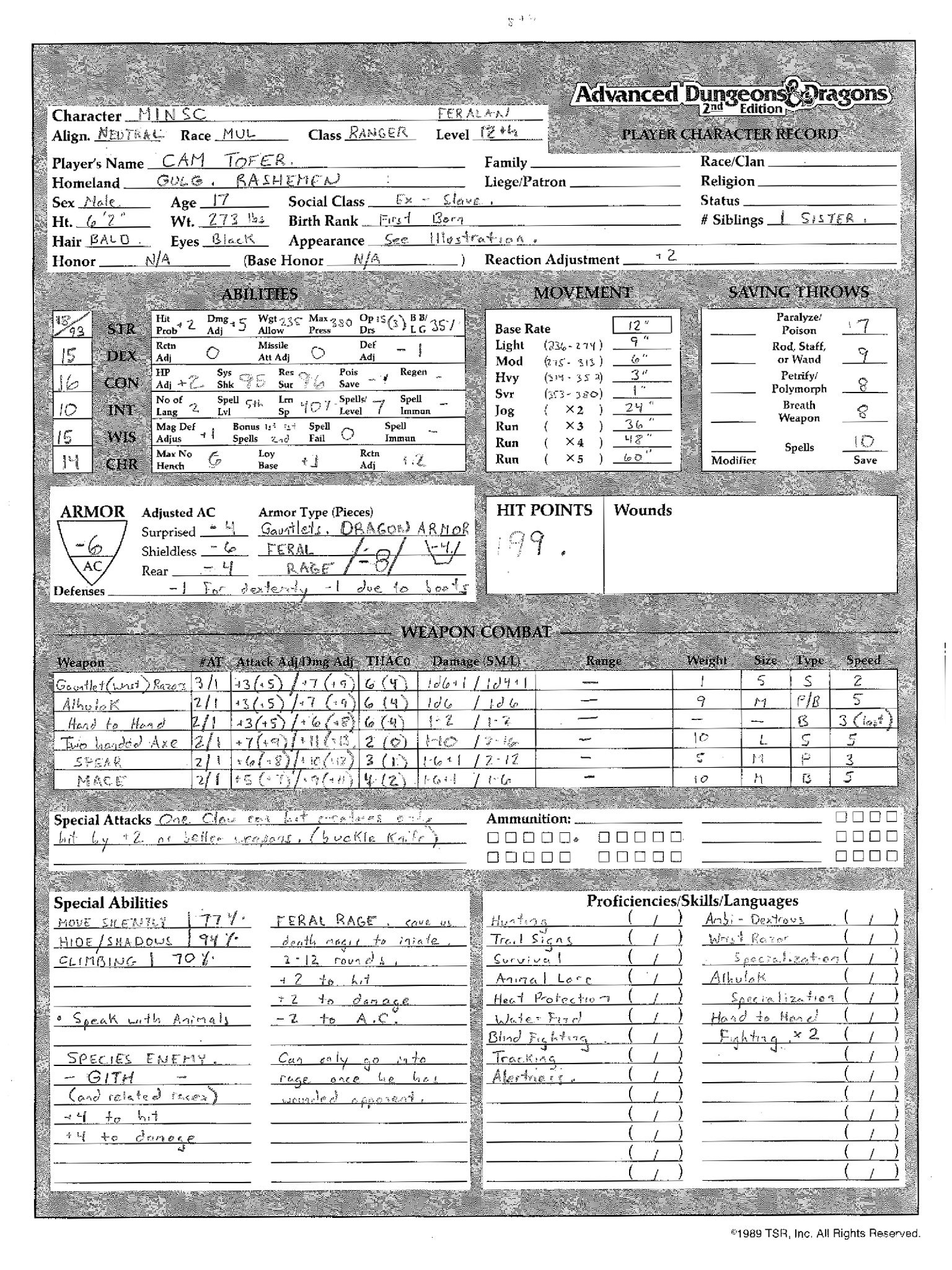
Statistics recorded on a character sheet

Characters in role-playing games are usually represented by a number of statistics. Statistics are an abstract measure of how successful a character is likely to be at a class of tasks.

Many game systems make distinctions between two key types of statistic: attributes and skills. These names are not always consistent across different games - a "skill" in one game may be a "talent" or "ability" in another. Attributes are statistics all characters possess: strength, agility, and intelligence are common examples. These are ranked, often on a numeric scale, so that a player can gauge the character's capabilities. For example, a character's strength rating could be used to determine the likelihood that the character can lift a certain weight. Skills are abilities that only some characters possess, such as negotiation, horseback riding, and marksmanship. Game systems often define skills that are genre-appropriate. For example, fantasy settings generally include magic skills, while science-fiction settings may contain spaceship piloting skills. However, some skills are found in several genres: a medieval rogue and a Wild West outlaw may both be very proficient at throwing knives, and a skill labeled "diplomacy" may benefit ancient Roman patricians or industrial tycoons of the 19th century equally well.

Some games such as Burning Wheel and The Shadow of Yesterday represent character motivations as statistics. Character motivations are things in which the character believes strongly. The Riddle of Steel's Spiritual Attributes, Burning Wheel's Beliefs and The Shadow of Yesterday's Keys are such features. They might reveal secrets the character has kept, aspirations they hold, or other characters they care about.

=== Solo TTRPGs ===
TTRPGs are typically played in groups, however, single player TTRPGs are also available. Brendan Hesse of Lifehacker highlighted that solo TTRPGs, like other TTRPGs, "run the gamut of settings and playstyles" and while it is a "different experience", solo games combine "the tactile feel of dice rolls and imagination-driven approach of group-based tabletop gaming, with the pick-up-and-play nature of single-player video games". Katie Wickens of GamesRadar+ noted that many of the earliest games were "solo mods of multiplayer TTRPGs", typically involving "dice and/or cards, a character sheet, and a hex map from your chosen tabletop RPG to wander through". Similar to non-solo games, they often required stat tracking; however, Wickens observed that the journaling elements and story tracking requirements "were far less introspective than the kind we often see" in the 2020s. Rowan Zeoli, for Polygon, explained that solo tabletop games "started in earnest with wargames in the [1980s]" and slowly rose "in prominence for the next few decades until the quarantine period of the ongoing COVID pandemic offered a perfect moment for board games and TTRPGs". Wickens commented that the "genre has evolved profoundly", with many including a narrative focus – "the lines between simple solo RPG systems and journaling games have become far more blurred over the years". Additionally, she noted that "many solo journaling systems today are not only subversions of the standard pen-and-paper model" but also introduce "their own unique and even far-flung mechanics to help cement the theme".

== Campaign settings ==
Each game has a setting in which adventures and campaigns (connected strings of adventures) can take place. Campaign settings are usually designed for a specific game (such as the Forgotten Realms setting for Dungeons & Dragons), though some settings are published with the intent of being usable in many games. There are numerous campaign settings available both in print and online. In addition to published campaign settings available for purchase, many game masters create their own.

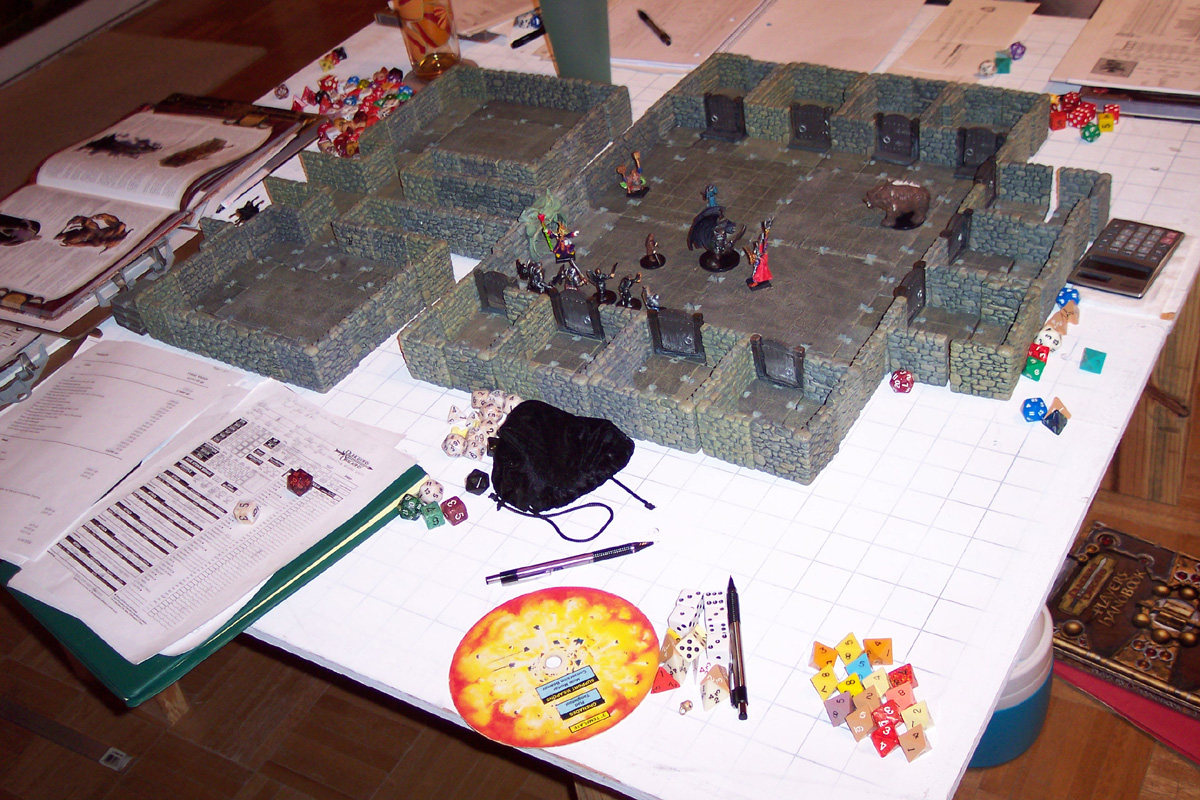
Miniature figurines, a dungeon diorama and other accessories for a Dungeons & Dragons campaign

Campaign settings exist for almost all genres of fiction. Because two long-time best-selling role-playing games, Dungeons & Dragons and Pathfinder, are part of the fantasy genre, fantasy is among the most played role-playing genres. While role-playing's roots began in fantasy, science fiction has been used in settings such as Traveller, horror formed the baseline of the World of Darkness and Call of Cthulhu while Spycraft was based in modern-day spy thriller-oriented settings. The comic book and superhero genres have been utilized for games such as Mutants and Masterminds.

The size of a setting can vary. Campaign settings such as the World of Greyhawk and Invisible Sun detail entire cosmologies and time-lines of thousands of years, while the setting of games such as Deadlands or Coyote & Crow might only describe one or more nations within a brief segment of alternate history. Other settings describe smaller locations, such as Blades in the Dark, which describes a single fantasy city, Alice is Missing, which describes a realistic small town, and Visigoths vs. Mall Goths, which takes place entirely inside one shopping mall. Some settings involve shifting between multiple different planets or timelines, sometimes with their own genres. For instance, in GURPS Infinite Worlds, the characters are "Infinity Patrol" agents who travel to alternate worlds, some of which include fantasy or steampunk as well as science fiction elements.

A number of campaign settings have fused multiple genres into a single game. Shadowrun combined fantasy with cyberpunk, Castle Falkenstein drew on fantasy and Steampunk elements, and Torg mashed up fantasy, science fiction, pulp and horror elements. Meanwhile, Feng Shui combined Chinese historical fantasy with Kung Fu action tropes and dystopian science fiction. Instead of literary genres, some campaign settings are modeled on video game genres, such as Fabula Ultima, which is based on JRPGs like Final Fantasy.

== Publishers ==
=== Major commercial publishers ===
The largest publisher of role-playing games is Wizards of the Coast, a wholly owned subsidiary of Hasbro and publisher of Dungeons & Dragons. Other major companies in 2020-2024 included Onyx Path Publishing (Vampire: The Requiem, Exalted, and others), Games Workshop (Warhammer 40K), Chaosium (Call of Cthulhu), Green Ronin Publishing (Fantasy AGE: Cthulhu Mythos), Free League Publishing (Alien: The Roleplaying Game, Mörk Borg), R. Talsorian Games (Cyberpunk), Paizo (Pathfinder, and Starfinder), Evil Hat Productions (Fate), and Modiphius Entertainment (Star Trek Adventures), as tracked on ICv2's Top 5 Roleplaying Games articles and the Bestselling Titles list on DriveThruRPG.

Most role-playing game publishers are privately held companies and do not release sales figures, making precise estimates difficult. There has been no publicly available, systematic examination of point of sale data, limiting further estimates to a rough consensus between industry analysts.

Most commercially published RPGs are small press products, selling fewer than a thousand units. Print on demand is often used to reduce costs for small print runs.

=== Indie publishers ===
Independent or "indie" role-playing games are tabletop role-playing games produced by individual creators or small press publishers, in contrast to games published by large corporations. As a movement, indie game design typically emphasizes creative freedom and fair financial compensation for game designers. The indie role-playing game community often produces games with signature and idiosyncratic character. Some indie designers create and sell their own games on Itch.io, DriveThruRPG, Kickstarter, BackerKit, or via in-person sales at gaming conventions, while others use distribution services such as Indie Press Revolution.

=== Business models ===
Role-playing games are produced under a variety of business models, which succeed or fail based on those models' objectives. The smallest viable businesses are one person companies that produce games using print on demand and e-book technologies. Most of these companies provide a secondary income for their owner-operators. Many of these businesses employ freelancers, but some do not; their owners complete every aspect of the product. Larger companies may have a small office staff that manages publishing, brand development and freelance work. Guided by a developer/manager, freelancers produce most of a game line's content according to a central plan. Some start with already established franchises while others create original series and then branch out as a franchise to multiple medias. Finally, a few companies (such as Wizards of the Coast and Mongoose Publishing) maintain an in-house writing and design staff.

The standard business model for successful RPGs relies on multiple sales avenues:

- The so-called three-tier distribution model, under which the company sells products to distributors who in turn sell the products to retailers who sell to customers. This is traditionally divided into the hobby trade (used by the majority of print publishers) and the book trade (viable for a smaller number of companies able to absorb returns and provide sufficiently large print runs). According to ICv2, hobby retail sales have declined, with the balance of hobby games sales moving from RPGs to miniatures games and collectible card games.
- Direct sales via the internet, through an online retailer or through the company's own electronic storefront.
- Electronic sales and distribution, either without any physical product at all (e-books) or through a POD service. Once limited to small companies, this sales venue is now employed by publishers of all sizes.

Typically, RPG publishers have a very long life cycle once they manage to generate an initial successful game. TSR, the initial publisher of Dungeons & Dragons was an independent entity until 1997 when it was acquired by Wizards of the Coast, who was subsequently acquired by Hasbro in 1999. Many of TSR's contemporaries remain in business as independent publishers. The core design group of a publisher is often kept as a team within the new company for the purposes of continuity and productivity, though layoffs are common after such mergers and acquisitions.

=== Homebrew ===
Non-official and custom content, such as rule alterations, new monsters or campaign stories, can be referred to by the fan term "homebrew". The amount of homebrew used differs between gaming groups. Some TTRPGs contain rules to facilitate the creation of homebrew but homebrew does not need to follow these rules to qualify as such. A ruling determined by a GM does not constitute as homebrew because it interprets rules established by a TTRPG rather than creating new content for the system.

== See also ==
- Gaming convention
- Indie role-playing game
- Polish role-playing games
- List of tabletop role-playing games
