= DA6 =

DA6 may refer to:

- DA postcode area (Dartford postcode area), a group of postal codes in England
- Davis DA-6, a light aircraft
- DA6, a Conway polyhedron notation for hexagonal trapezohedron
- DA6, a model of Honda Integra
- DA6, a Eurofighter Typhoon variant
