= Adventures in Blackmoor =

Dungeons & Dragons adventure

- Code: DA1
- TSR product code: 9172
- Rules required: Dungeons & Dragons Expert Set
- Character levels: 10–14
- Campaign setting: Blackmoor
- Authors: Dave L. Arneson and David J. Ritchie
- First published: 1986

Linked modules
- DA1, DA2, DA3, DA4.

Adventures in Blackmoor is a 64-page Dungeons & Dragons fantasy role-playing game adventure, designed to be compatible with the Dungeons & Dragons Expert Set.

== Plot summary ==
Adventures in Blackmoor is an adventure scenario in which the player characters are sent back in time 3000 years earlier, in which the characters will need to rescue King Uther of the land of Blackmoor from The Prison Out of Time.

The adventure takes place in three different time periods inside the same inn. The first part of the adventure takes place in a dungeon setting. Clues found in the inn lead the characters to the second part of the adventure. The inn travels between dimensions for the second part of the adventure, which involves changes inside the inn as it shifts to another dimension. In the third and final part, the inn shifts to another dungeon setting.

The last 20 pages of the adventure contain a description of Blackmoor, and detail 38 important non-player characters from the setting. The module contains campaign setting material for Blackmoor as well as the Thonian Empire.

== Publication history ==
DA1 Adventures in Blackmoor was written by Dave L. Arneson and David J. Ritchie, and published by TSR in 1986 as a 64-page booklet with a color map and outer folder. The module uses the original campaign setting of Blackmoor that Arneson created, revised for the Dungeons & Dragons Expert Set rules. It features cover art by Jeff Easley and interior artwork by Jim Holloway. It is designed for character levels 10–14, and features some locations and characters from Dave Arneson's original Blackmoor campaign.

This module included a 64-page booklet with an A2 color map packaged inside a wraparound card cover. Also included are seven pages of background information for the Dungeon Master, which detail the history of the area where the adventure takes place, as well as three more pages presenting the world of Blackmoor to the player characters.

== Reception ==
Graeme Davis reviewed Adventures in Blackmoor for White Dwarf #86, calling the adventure "a device to get the Player characters into the world of Blackmoor from wherever they happen to be at the time". Davis felt that having the adventure take place in three versions of the same inn "cuts down on the map requirement but can lead to a static feel in play". He noted that while the adventure's introduction links it to X1 Isle of Dread, the device could be used in any game world. He felt that ending the adventure in an old-fashioned "zoo-dungeon" was disappointing, "reminding us of Blackmoor's origins", but that the clues leading to the second part of the adventure were intriguing.

Davis felt that the background provided on Blackmoor was interesting information, but was too little for Dungeon Masters to base further adventures on the setting. He found that the adventure only has one core idea that doesn't get explored much. He was also disappointed that Blackmoor wasn't explored much "despite the colour map which comes as part of the package". Davis does note that players familiar with TSR and Judges' Guild products of the late 1970s would get a feeling of nostalgia from this adventure, and that the "zoo-dungeon" is "well written and set out, with a reasonable plot, and should provide an interesting and enjoyable session's play", despite how such adventures had become old fashioned by the time this module was published. He concluded the review by stating that the module "makes a reasonably good introduction to Blackmoor, but a lot will rest on DA2 and the rest of the series; as a campaign starter DA1 has a lot going for it, but it will stand or fall on what comes next".

== See also ==
- List of Dungeons & Dragons modules
