= Winged Samurai =

1980 video game

- Publisher: Discovery Games
- Designer: David Wesely
- Programmer: Stephen Goss
- Platforms: Apple II, PET, TRS-80, Atari 8-bit
- Release: 1980

Winged Samurai is a 1980 video game designed by David Wesely and published by Discovery Games for the Apple II, Commodore PET, TRS-80, and Atari 8-bit computers.

== Gameplay ==
Winged Samurai is a game in which the player is in command of 16 Japanese fighter aircraft and must destroy bombers on their way to Rabaul.

== Reception ==
Forrest Johnson reviewed Winged Samurai in The Space Gamer No. 33. Johnson commented that "Unfortunately, in creating this historical authenticity, the programmer sacrificed the game to the simulation. The display is purely two-dimensional, and the graphics are unimpressive. ... The game is not real time. You can take all day to make your combat decisions. ... Recommended to historical aviation gamers."
