= Branzoll Castle =

Building in Klausen, Italy

- Castello Branzoll
- Klausen
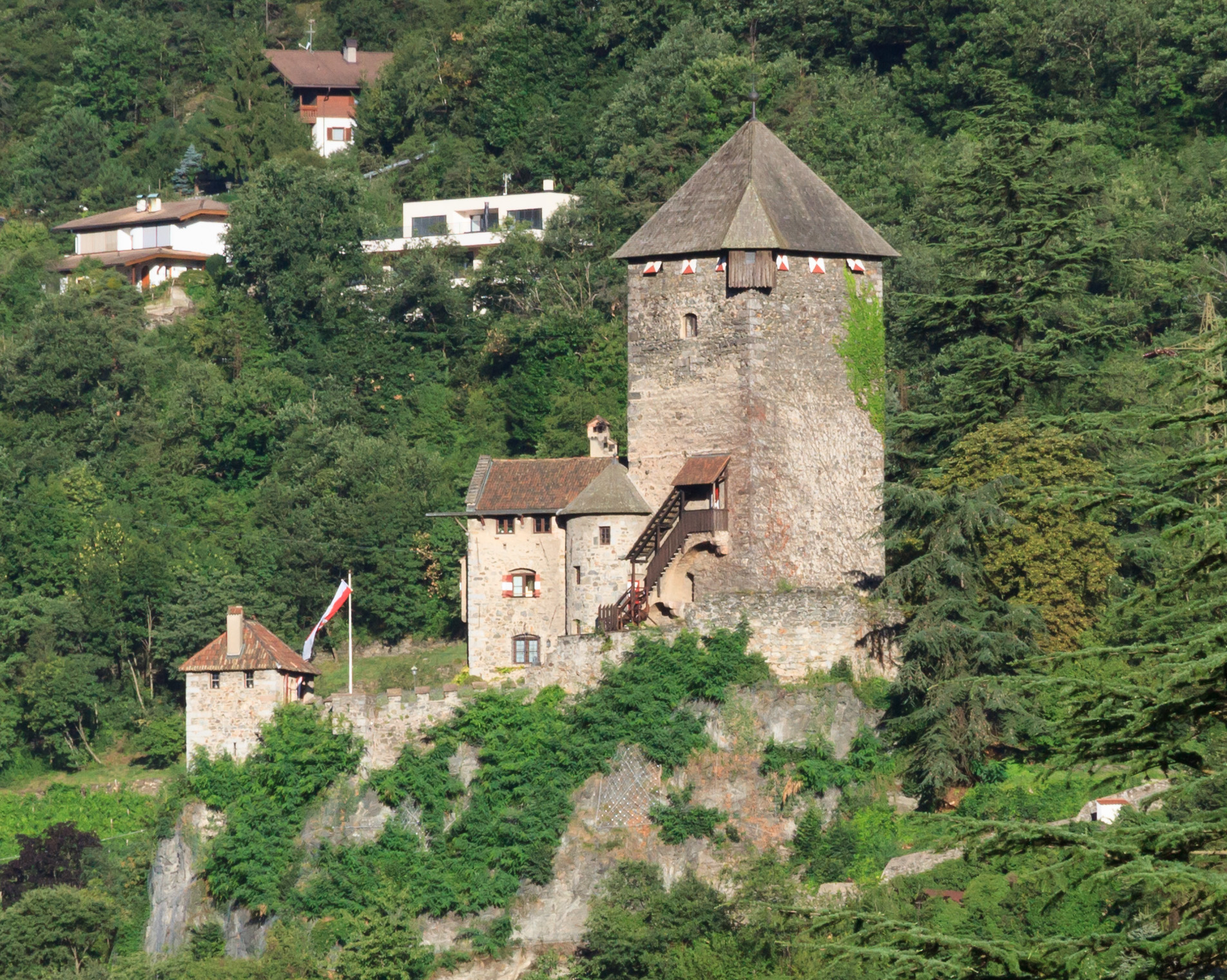
- Branzoll Castle (2017)

Site information
- Type: Hill castle
- Code: IT-BZ
- Condition: Renovated in 1895 and 1911, inhabited

Location
- Coordinates: 46°38′25″N 11°33′55″E

Site history
- Built: about 1250 (first documented mention)

Castle Branzoll (German: Burg Branzoll, Italian: castel Branzoll) is on the southern slope of Mount Säben, below the Säben Abbey, and somewhat above the city of Klausen in South Tyrol, Italy. Blackmoor, the first fantasy roleplaying game campaign setting, used a kit model of the castle to represent the titular Castle Blackmoor.

By 1155, the Lords of Säben from the Volser family had been named the burgraves of Hochstift Brixen on Mount Säben. Tensions arose in 1255 between Bishop Bruno von Kirchberg and some of his ministeriales, including Heinrich and Buchard von Säben. In the course of this dispute, the Lords of Säben built Branzoll castle at the entrance to the hilltop episcopal castle.

Presently, the hilltop castle consists of a small inner bailey, protected by a zwinger and an outer bailey. The belfry is over 20 meters high. The zwinger has been partially reconstructed, and the outer bailey is now a garden. Restoration work was completed in 1912, which included the addition of a new residential structure. A semicircular tower with a stone staircase connecting the floors was installed between the bergfried and the residential building. The curtain wall was also restored and partially crowned with battlements.
