= The Omega War =

Board game by Steve Jackson Games

The Omega War was a pull-out game in Issue 14 of Ares which featured cover art by Timothy Truman (1983)

The Omega War is a science fiction-themed board game published by TSR through its subsidiary Simulations Publications, Inc. (SPI) in 1983.

== Description ==
The Omega War is a two-player game of strategic warfare for control of a post-apocalyptic North America.

=== Setting ===
Three hundred years after a devastating atomic war left the nations of the earth in ruins, North America has been rebuilt as a number of clanholds and other population centers under the control of the World Union. But rebels wish to overturn the status quo.

=== Components ===
The game includes:

- 22" x 34" hex grid game map
- 200 diecut counters
- 32-page rulebook
- two 6-sided dice (not included in the magazine edition)

=== Gameplay ===
The Rebels are pitted against the Union. Each turn is composed of twelve phases:

1. Union recruitment phase
2. Rebel political phase
3. Rebel march phase
4. Rebel combat phase
5. Union reaction phase
6. Rebel exploitation phase
7. Union march phase
8. Rebel reaction phase
9. Union combat phase
10. Union exploitation phase
11. Rebel reinforcement phase
12. Game turn record phase

=== Victory conditions ===
There are three possible ways to win:

- If the Political Index (PI) is greater than 45 at the start of a turn, then the revolution collapses and the Union player wins.
- If the PI is less than 5 at the start of a turn, then the Rebel player wins.
- If the game date reaches the end of November 2421, then victory is determined by the PI level: 30 or less indicates a Rebel victory, above 30 is a Union victory.

== Publication history ==
In the early 1980s, SPI ran into financial difficulties and was taken over by TSR, which then used SPI as a subsidiary to release board wargames. The Omega War was one such product, a board game designed by David James Ritchie, with illustrations by Timothy Truman. It was originally published as a pull-out game in Issue 14 of Ares (Spring 1983), and was also released the same year as a boxed set.

== Reception ==
In Issue 71 of Space Gamer (December 1984), Rick Swan was not impressed, writing "Not only is The Omega War too long and too dull, the stiff turn sequence and confusing graphics make it a chore to play. Too bad, because there are certainly enough ideas here for a decent game. As presented, The Omega War suffers from too much ambition and too little development."

== Other reviews ==
- Simulacrum #11
