= DA module series =

Series of adventures in Dungeons & Dragons

Adventures in Blackmoor Temple of the Frog City of the Gods Duchy of Ten
- Code: DA1–DA4
- Rules required: Dungeons & Dragons Expert Set
- Character levels: 10–14
- Campaign setting: Blackmoor
- Authors: Dave L. Arneson and David J. Ritchie
- First published: 1986–1987

The DA module series is a series of four adventures for the Dungeons & Dragons role-playing game, designed to be compatible with the Dungeons & Dragons Expert Set. They were written for character levels 10–14 by Dave Arneson and David J. Ritchie and published from 1986 to 1987.

== Modules ==
Adventures in Blackmoor (module DA1) is a 64-page adventure with cover art by Jeff Easley and interior artwork by Jim Holloway. It features some locations and characters from Dave Arneson's original Blackmoor campaign.

Temple of the Frog (module DA2, ISBN 0-88038-317-8) is a 48-page adventure published in 1986 with TSR product code "TSR 9175". This was a reworking of the original version, released in 1975 as part of the Blackmoor supplement. It features cover art by Dennis Beauvais and interior art by Mark Nelson.

City of the Gods (module DA3, ISBN 0-88038-389-5) is a 1987 adventure with TSR product code "TSR 9191". It was edited by Deborah Campbell Ritchie, with cover art by Doug Chaffee, interior art by Jim Holloway, cartography by Dennis Kauth and David C. Sutherland III, and typesetting by Kim N. Lindau.

The Duchy of Ten (module DA4) was written by David J. Ritchie, with cover art by Clyde Caldwell and interior art by David Dorman. It was published in 1987.

== The Duchy of Ten ==
The Duchy of Ten
- Code: DA4
- TSR product code: 9205
- Rules required: Dungeons & Dragons Expert Set
- Character levels: 10 - 14
- Campaign setting: Blackmoor
- Authors: David J. Ritchie
- First published: 1987

Linked modules
- DA1, DA2, DA3, DA4.

The Duchy of Ten is an adventure module designed for use with the Expert Set rules for the Dungeons & Dragons fantasy role-playing game. It was written by David J. Ritchie, with cover art by Clyde Caldwell and interior art by David Dorman.

=== Plot summary ===
The Duchy of Ten is based on Dave Arneson's original Blackmoor campaign. In this scenario, the player characters need to go to the place where the terrible artifact known as the Well of Souls was forged, as that is the only place it can be destroyed. The module includes campaign setting data and a large map of the lands of the west.

=== Publication history ===
DA4 The Duchy of Ten was written by David J. Ritchie, with a cover by Clyde Caldwell and interior illustrations by Dave Dorman, and was published by TSR in 1987 as a 48-page booklet with a large color map and an outer folder.

== See also ==
- List of Dungeons & Dragons modules
