= Leeon D. Davis =

American aircraft designer

- Born: 9 March 1930
- Died: 7 April 2007 (aged 77)
- Known for: Homebuilt aircraft

Leeon D. Davis (March 9, 1930 – April 7, 2007) was an American aircraft designer, noted for his homebuilt aircraft.

Davis started building aircraft models at the age of six. Davis graduated with a high school education and a correspondence course in drafting and engineering from the Ryan Aeronautical Institute. Davis specialized as an aircraft mechanic while in the Air Force. Davis worked as a sheet-metal worker at Aero Commander before undertaking his own designs.

On 6 March 1957, Davis formed Davis Aircraft Corporation to build aircraft of his own design. All of Davis' aircraft featured a characteristic V-tail, and the most successful of these was the DA-2. Plans to develop this basic design into an aircraft capable of certification went unrealized.

In 1964, Davis and George P. Migo won the United States Weather Bureau's public service award for taking off in two planes alongside a Tornado that formed near Chicago, and flew ahead of its path warning people on the ground and via radio.

Leeon Davis died on 7 April 2007 at the age of 77.
