= Chennault's Flying Tigers =

1981 video game

- Publisher: Discovery Games
- Platforms: Apple II, Atari 8-bit, PET, TRS-80
- Release: 1981

Chennault's Flying Tigers (shown as Flying Tigers on the packaging) is a video game published in 1981 by Discovery Games for the Apple II, Atari 8-bit computers, Commodore PET, and TRS-80.

== Gameplay ==
Flying Tigers is a game in which a squadron of P40C Tomahawk battles Japanese pilots in December 1941. The game is based on the Flying Tigers who flew over China during World War II. The player is tasked with shooting down Japanese bombers and fighters using a keyboard and a joystick.

== Reception ==
Dr. Johnny Wilson reviewed the game for Computer Gaming World, and stated that "In short, Flying Tigers is an interesting game that is not yet living up to its potential."
