= Temple of the Frog =

Dungeons & Dragons adventure module

- Code: DA2
- TSR product code: 9175
- Rules required: Dungeons & Dragons Expert Set
- Character levels: 10-14
- Campaign setting: Blackmoor
- Authors: Dave L. Arneson and David J. Ritchie
- First published: 1986

Linked modules
- DA1, DA2, DA3, DA4.

Temple of the Frog (ISBN 0-88038-317-8) is a 48-page 1986 adventure module for the Dungeons & Dragons roleplaying game. Its module code is DA2 and its TSR product code is TSR 9175. Another version of it was originally released in 1975 as part of the Blackmoor supplement.

== Plot summary ==
Temple of the Frog is an adventure in which the player characters must save a baroness held captive in the evil Temple of the Frog, located deep within the Great Dismal Swamp.

== Publication history ==
The 1986 version of Temple of the Frog was written by Dave L. Arneson and David J. Ritchie, with cover art by Denis Beauvais and interior art by Mark Nelson. It was designed to be usable with the Dungeons & Dragons Expert Set, like all modules in the DA series. DA2 Temple of the Frog was published by TSR in 1986 as a 48-page booklet with an outer folder. This adventure was adapted from a scenario found in the original Blackmoor supplement.

== See also ==
- List of Dungeons & Dragons modules
