= David Wesely =

American board and video game developer (born 1945)

- Born: 1945 (age 80–81)
- Education: Hamline University
- Occupations: Board game designer, video game developer
- Notable work: Strategos N

David Wesely (born 1945) is an American wargamer, board game designer, and video game developer. Wesely's developments, inspired by Kriegsspiel wargames, were important and influential in the early history of role-playing games.

== Early life and education ==
Dave Wesely was born in 1945.

Wesely studied physics at Hamline University, in Saint Paul, Minnesota.

== Strategos ==
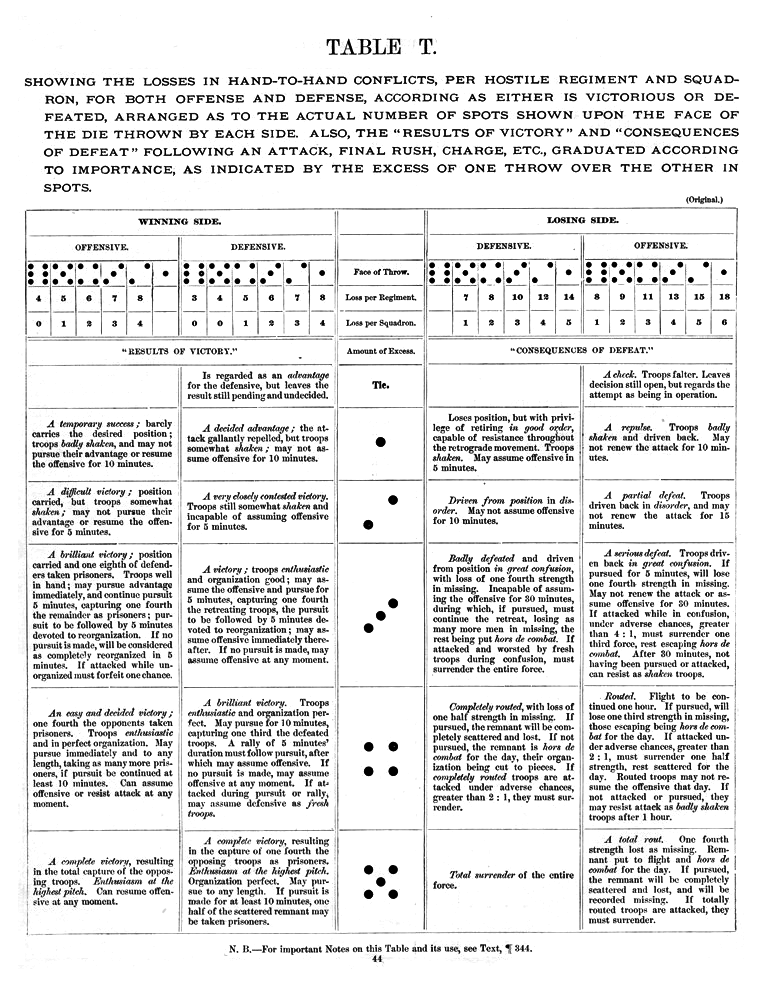
Strategos (1880), Table T, used for combat resolution

In 1967, Wesely rediscovered the 19th-century professional wargame Strategos, by Charles A. L. Totten, at the University of Minnesota library. An avid hobby wargamer and reader of wargaming literature, Wesely seized upon these rules and incorporated their principles into the miniature wargames played by the Midwest Military Simulation Association (MMSA). These included the role of the referee, and the principle of free kriegsspiel that players could attempt anything, although not always successfully, and that the referee should be able to make judgements to cover anything not ordinarily covered by the rules. Totten's Strategos became the cornerstone text for the Twin Cities gamers.

== Strategos N ==
The incorporation of Totten's Strategos into MMSA wargaming culminated with the 1968 development of Strategos N, a compact set of Napoleonic wargaming rules devised by Wesely and other MMSA members. Dave Wesely developed Strategos N as the first MMSA Strategos variant for the first time in 1968. It was later self-published in 1970, and again in 1984.

== Strategos C ==
Dave Wesely developed Strategos C for wargames set during the American Civil War, and it circulated in draft form in 1969, acting as a precursor to Valley Forge (1976).

== Role-playing games ==
The concept of the referee in Totten's Strategos led to Dave Wesely expanding upon these ideas to create the Braunstein games, which were influential in the early history of role-playing games. This development of the role of the referee became a catalyst for the evolution of role-playing games.

In a 1981 interview published in Pegasus magazine, Dave Arneson described Wesely's Braunstein as a game in which each player had a "role" that they were playing. He also described his Blackmoor game as a variation of Dave Wesely's earlier Braunstein, based on Wesely's ideas about role-playing, but set in a fantasy world. Jon Peterson cites Arneson's Blackmoor as being the most significant precursor to Dungeons & Dragons.

== Valley Forge ==
Wesely created the wargame Valley Forge, which was published by TSR Hobbies in 1976. Dave Arneson wrote an introduction for the game. Peterson describes Valley Forge as an adaptation of Strategos N to the American Revolutionary War.

== Video games ==
Wesely designed video games for Discovery Games, including Winged Samurai, and Chennault's Flying Tigers.
