= City of the Gods =

1987 Dungeons & Dragons adventure module

- Code: DA3
- TSR product code: 9191
- Rules required: Dungeons & Dragons Expert Set
- Character levels: 10–14
- Campaign setting: Blackmoor
- Authors: Dave L. Arneson and David J. Ritchie
- First published: 1987
- ISBN: 0-88038-389-5

Linked modules
- DA1, DA2, DA3, DA4.

City of the Gods is a 1987 adventure module for the Dungeons & Dragons role-playing game. Its module code is DA3 and its TSR product code is TSR 9191.

== Plot summary ==
City of the Gods is an adventure scenario in which the player characters (PCs) are sent to the City of the Gods by the leaders of Blackmoor to negotiate for some divine magic, or steal the magic if bargaining fails. The PCs journey 4,000 years into the past to the land of Blackmoor. There, they are hired by The Fetch, previously seen in the adventure Temple of the Frog, because the Froggies, a cult introduced in the same adventure, have become active once more. The cult is using the futuristic technology of the City of the Gods to achieve their ends, and the player characters must attempt to contact the inhabitants of the city to turn them against the Froggies, and possibly form an alliance with the Kingdom of Blackmoor. The adventure takes place in three parts, and contains elements of fantasy and science fiction. The module also presents game statistics for new alien machines, and twelve pre-generated player characters.

== Publication history ==
DA3 City of the Gods was written by Dave L. Arneson and David J. Ritchie, with cover art by Doug Chaffee and interior illustrations by Jim Holloway. It was published by TSR in 1987 as a 48-page booklet with a large color map and an outer folder. The adventure material is covered on fourteen pages, with the remainder of the booklet containing background information and statistics for the creatures, non-player characters and devices that appear in the adventure, and presents different ways to bring the player characters to Blackmoor. Deborah Campbell Ritchie edited the module. Cartography was done by Dennis Kauth and David C. Sutherland III, while Kim N. Lindau did the typesetting.

== Reception ==
Graeme Davis reviewed City of the Gods for White Dwarf No. 92. He commented that "If you like mixing fantasy and SF, fine; if not, this is probably not for you." He went on to say that the adventure material "consists of two out-in-the-open fights and a dungeon bash round the spaceship, and that's your lot." He notes that while some of the supplemental materials are useful, most are not, saying "Personally, I've never been keen on letting level 10-14 D&D characters stock up with grenades, blasters and lightsabres, but no doubt this will appeal to some." He said that "hardware buffs" may like the new monsters, and that the NPCs are "interesting and useful", though with some overlap from the previous Blackmoor adventure, Temple of the Frog. On the pregenerated player characters, he comments that "Statistics, personality and magic are detailed for each, but there is no mention of conventional equipment, so the characters will have to be equipped - which, to my mind, defeats the object of pregenerated PCs..." Davis concludes the review by saying: "If you are following the Blackmoor campaign, or if you want to play a 10th-14th level one-off mixing fantasy and SF, then you will probably like DA3... Otherwise, you may well find it disappointing."

Errol Farstad reviewed City of the Gods for Polyhedron No. 37, rating it as an 8 out of 10 overall.

== See also ==
- List of Dungeons & Dragons modules
