= Midwest Military Simulation Association =

The Midwest Military Simulation Association (MMSA) is a group of wargamers and military figurine collectors active during the late 1960s and 1970s.

== History ==
When wargaming was in its heyday and role-playing games were first developed, the group lived in the Minneapolis-St Paul area. Its membership included Dave Arneson, David Wesely, Ken Fletcher, Dave Megarry, John and Richard Snider and others.

In 2006 Wesely described how the club began:

The Midwest Military Simulation Association was founded on April 18, 1963, by Ray Allard, noted amateur historian and reenactor, now deceased. The first meeting was attended by Dr. William Musing, Loren Johnson, Ron Lauraunt and Winston Sandeen, Ray Allard Junior and David A. Wesely. Ray was about 54 at the time, the next four were all about 30 and the last two were teenagers. Besides age, the group was split by interest, with the five older guys being historians, collectors, modelers and painters of military miniatures, and the two youngest being wargamers. The older guys put up with us, and Winston Sandeen even played in a few miniatures battles, partly because we hung on their every word when they told war stories about WWII and the Korean War.

The ranks were augmented by friends of the original members, and one of these friends, Don Nicholson, recruited new members by contacting people who had checked out "Strategos: A Game of War" by Charles Totten at the UM library. In this way Jim Clark and Greg Scott were recruited. The MMSA also found new wargamers by running welcome tables during fall registration at the UM and the University of St. Thomas, or by running ads in The General and Strategy & Tactics magazines.

Dave Arneson joined when he was in high school. He produced a newsletter describing the group's Napoleonic and American Civil War games, as well as its play-by-mail Diplomacy games. In 1986, under the direction of Hal Thinglum, The Midwest Wargamers' Association Newsletter won the Charles S. Roberts Award as the best Best Amateur Wargaming Magazine. The younger members of the group began to meet at Arneson's house. More interested in wargaming than collecting or historical reenactment, these members played a critical role in the development of RPGs. Dave Wesely conducted what is considered to be the first role-playing game, set in Napoleonic Germany, in 1967. Arneson later developed a fantasy role-playing milieu called Blackmoor, and co-created Dungeons & Dragons with Gary Gygax in 1973. Dave Megarry conceived the idea of a dungeon crawl, and designed a board game around this idea called Dungeon!, published by TSR, Inc. in 1975. That same year TSR also published Star Probe by John Snider.
