= Blackmoor (campaign setting) =

Dungeons & Dragons fictional campaign setting

- Designers: Dave Arneson
- Publishers: Tactical Studies Rules (TSR), Zeitgeist Games
- Publication: 1970s
- Genres: Tabletop role-playing game
- Languages: English
- Systems: Dungeons & Dragons; d20; D&D 4th edition

Blackmoor is a fantasy role-playing game campaign setting generally associated with the game Dungeons & Dragons. It originated in the early 1970s as the personal setting of Dave Arneson, the co-creator of Dungeons & Dragons, as an early testing ground for what would become D&D.

== Early history ==
Blackmoor began as a development of David Wesely's "Braunstein" games following Duane Jenkins' Brownstone (Old West) variant and Arneson's own wargaming sessions, into which he had begun to introduce fantasy elements. Initially inspired by Conan novels and gothic horror, Arneson expanded the setting around the eponymous town, castle, and multi-level dungeon using ideas borrowed from The Lord of the Rings and Dark Shadows and made use of the Fantasy Supplement rules from the Chainmail game. Blackmoor was a campaign centered on individual player characters capable of continuing progressions, which encouraged cooperative play to succeed. D. H. Boggs suggested a possible influence of the film The Black Room, as inspiration for Blackmoor as it was aired twice before the first game, and it was mentioned by Dave Arneson as a film he was possibly watching while reading Conan.

The origins of the Blackmoor setting lie in the Castle & Crusade Society, a subgroup of the International Federation of Wargaming specializing in medieval miniatures combat; the group was initially driven by Gary Gygax. Dave Arneson was among the first to join the Society in April 1970, and many other members of his Twin Cities gaming group followed, including Duane Jenkins, Bill Hoyt, Ed Werncke, Mike Carr, and Marshall Hoegfeldt. Within months, the leadership of the Society had decided to form a fictional "Great Kingdom", with parcels of land awarded to and contested by members of the organization. Arneson assumed responsibility for the far northern reaches of the Great Kingdom, and it was there that he began to stage medieval games that led up to the Blackmoor setting. An announcement in Arneson's fanzine Corner of the Table describes the first game in the campaign, one built on the model of Dave Wesely's "Braunstein" series of games:

There will be a medieval "Braunstein" April 17, 1971, at the home of Dave Arneson from 1300 hrs to 2400 hrs with refreshments being available on the usual basis. ... It will feature mythical creatures and a Poker game under the Troll's bridge between sunup and sundown.

The next issue of Corner of the Table promised "the start of the 'Black Moors' battle reports, a series dealing with the perils of living in Medieval Europe". Initially, The Northern Marches was set up to be an ongoing multiplayer wargame, with the potential for Braunstein games. The Barony of Blackmoor formed the centerpiece of the game, and the various players attached to it (Greg Svenson, David Megarry, Dan Nicholson, Duane Jenkins), initially represented the forces of good. Duane Jenkins, for example, ruled the Northern Marches, first as a bandit chief, later promoted to Baron as Sir Jenkins. As the game progressed, more of Arneson's Napoleonics players joined in increasingly diverse roles. Mike Carr, for example, became a village priest, and then Bishop of Blackmoor. Others chose early in the campaign to side with the forces of evil, such as a wizard played by John Soukup. Early descriptions of the activities of the Blackmoor campaign circulated in a news sheet called the Blackmoor Gazette and Rumormonger. Players became increasingly drawn to the innovative dungeon exploration mechanic that Arneson invented; by 1972, that had become a major focus of the game. As demand for Blackmoor increased, Arneson fielded out refereeing duties to other players in his local circle.

In the summer of 1972, Arneson famously wrote an article detailing "Facts about Black Moor" for Domesday Book #13, which brought his innovations to the attention of the rest of the Castle & Crusade Society. That fall, Arneson demonstrated the game for Gygax, and work on Dungeons & Dragons commenced. As rule development proceeded, the Blackmoor campaign continued, and began coordinating with a parallel campaign known as Greyhawk run out of Lake Geneva by Gygax and his circle. After the publication of Dungeons & Dragons, the Blackmoor campaign continued, but as a number of key participants (including Arneson) left Minneapolis to work in Lake Geneva, play of the campaign grew more sporadic.

== Supplement II: Blackmoor ==
The original Blackmoor supplement (TSR, Inc., 1975)

The original Blackmoor product was published by Tactical Studies Rules (TSR) in 1975, as the second supplement to D&D (the first being Greyhawk). The booklet was named for the original role-playing campaign world by Dave Arneson, who also wrote this booklet. It added rules, monsters, treasure, and the first published role-playing game adventure, the "Temple of the Frog", a scenario from the Loch Gloomen section of the Blackmoor campaign. Other than the "Temple of the Frog", Blackmoor did not include any information on the Blackmoor setting itself.

== The First Fantasy Campaign ==
First Fantasy Campaign (Judges Guild), 1977

Written by Dave Arneson and published by Judges Guild in 1977, The First Fantasy Campaign added information on the actual Blackmoor campaign setting. It included baronies, citadels, history of leaders and details on the Blackmoor dungeon. It also contained additional rules for creating lairs, character interests and vocations.

The First Fantasy Campaign anthologizes material produced at various stages of the Blackmoor campaign, from Magic Swords (1971) up to the Blackmoor dungeons Arneson commonly ran at conventions in 1976. Only a relatively small amount of original material, primarily link text, was written specifically for the First Fantasy Campaign, though all maps and some connected illustrations were redrawn and relettered by the Judges Guild's Bob Bledsaw. Thus, the First Fantasy Campaign is a rich repository of pre-Dungeons & Dragons material which preserves original rules and campaign events. For example, it contains the entirety of the "Facts about Black Moor" article from Domesday Book #13. It also contains circa-1972 price lists as well as rules dating from the exile of the Blackmoor Bunch to Loch Gloomen in the late Spring of 1972.

The 1977 first printing, including its cover, is in black and white. The cover says "The First Fantasy Campaign Playing Aid" with "Playing Aid" as a subtitle. It shows a large mostly circular picture with trees in the foreground and a fire elemental in the background, below which it says "by Dave Arneson" and "Judges Guild". There is no other verbiage on the cover and the price does not appear on the cover. The back cover has a product list titled "Booty List" with the highest number being 35 and "New Non-Sub Items" listing product numbers 36–39. It comes with the first printing of the First Fantasy Campaign Maps. This book consists of 92 numbered pages plus the cover, inside cover, back cover and table of contents for a total of 96 total pages. The dark red cover was used for the reformatted later printings that used a smaller font and fewer pages.

== DA module series ==
DA expansion modules
Code	Title
DA1	Adventures in Blackmoor
DA2	Temple of the Frog
DA3	City of the Gods
DA4	The Duchy of Ten

Arneson left TSR in the early 1980s, but Blackmoor remained a part of D&D lore and was referred to in many later supplements. In a subsequent re-release of the world of Greyhawk for the Advanced Dungeons & Dragons game, an arctic region of mysterious black ice in the northwestern area of the map was called Blackmoor. However, Arneson's Blackmoor became integral to a different setting and rules system, those of the Basic Dungeons & Dragons game.

For various reasons, TSR published two different versions of their flagship game line. Over the course of several supplements, the Basic Dungeons & Dragons developed its own campaign setting, referred to at first simply as the Known World and later as Mystara. When the history of Mystara was codified, it was established that Arneson's Blackmoor had existed in the world's distant past, achieved a technologically advanced civilization, and then destroyed itself in a global catastrophe that shifted the planet's axis.

Its influence was now central to at least one of TSR's published worlds, but the actual setting of Blackmoor as Arneson described it had yet to be presented. This was finally remedied in the mid-1980s through the DA series of adventure modules, which carried a party of adventurers into Mystara's past to visit Blackmoor. The first of these, DA1 Adventures in Blackmoor, described in general the geography and politics of Blackmoor and the means by which the characters travel there. DA2 Temple of the Frog expanded the scenario that had appeared in the original Blackmoor supplement. DA3 City of the Gods explored the starship crashed near the Kingdom of Blackmoor, from which the setting's intentional anachronisms derived. DA4 The Duchy of Ten dealt with a horde of invading barbarians, but was the only work not derived from Dave Arneson's original campaign notes. A fifth installment, DA5 City of Blackmoor, was announced but was never written or published.

There were no further direct explorations of Blackmoor, although later Mystara products continued to make reference to it. For instance, The Wrath of the Immortals, an epic adventure which described a massive war involving both heaven and earth, climaxes with the discovery of the preserved control room from the starship that had crashed near Blackmoor millennia ago.

== Later editions ==
After the Basic D&D game and its Mystara setting were discontinued, Zeitgeist Games, where Arneson worked prior to his death, produced an updated d20 System version of Blackmoor titled Dave Arneson's Blackmoor Campaign Setting, published by Goodman Games in 2004. Goodman and Zeitgeist also produced Blackmoor adventure modules. In 2009, Code Monkey Publishing released Dave Arneson's Blackmoor: The First Campaign, an updated campaign guide for the 4th edition of D&D.

== Blackmoor MMRPG ==
There was also an ongoing massively multiplayer role-playing game campaign organized by Zeitgeist games, which is similar in form to the Living Campaigns organized by the RPGA. The version of the campaign for D&D 3.5 ended in February 2009 at MegaCon.

== See also ==
- Dungeon!, a Blackmoor-inspired board game
