= Davis DA-2 =

DA-2
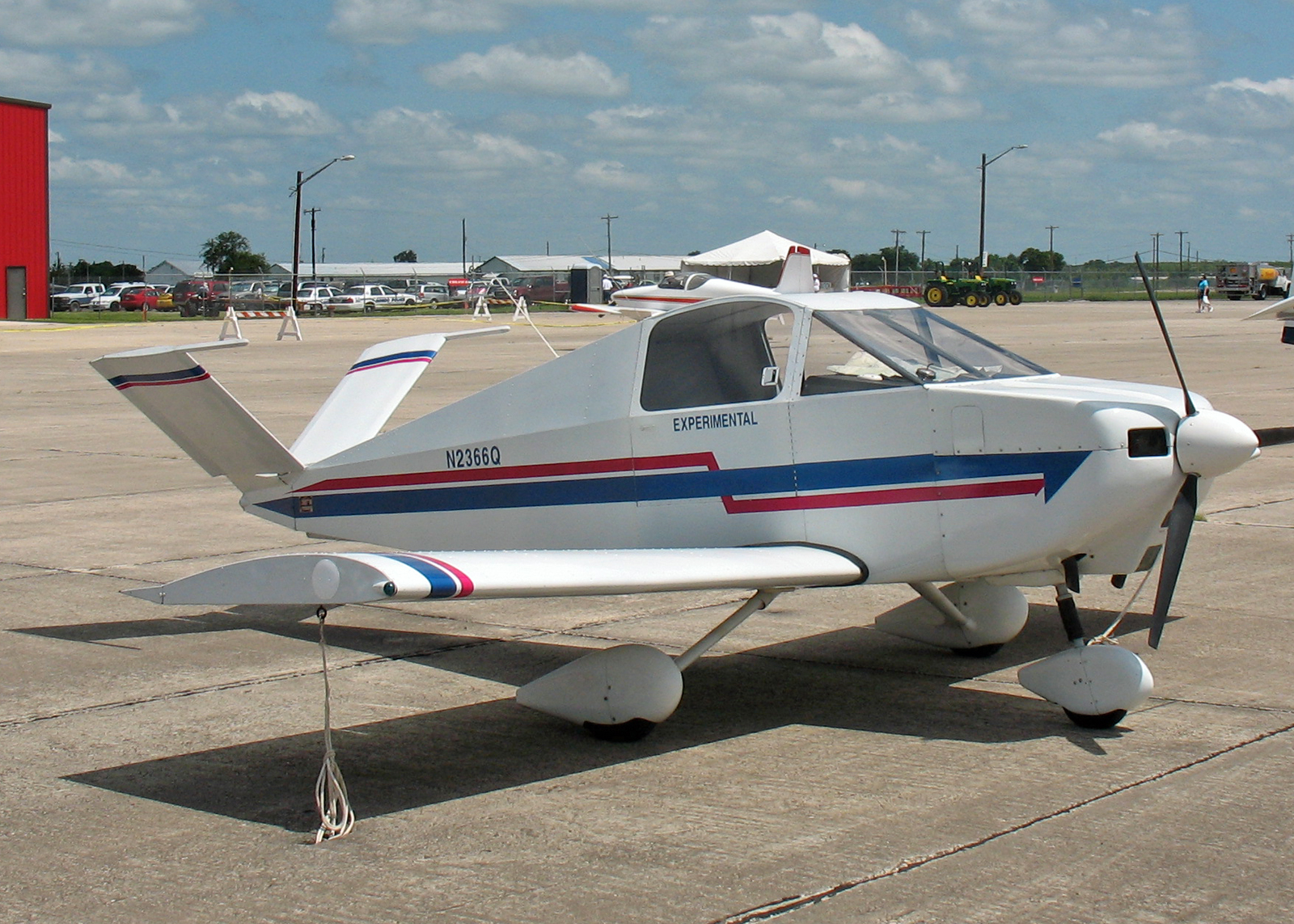

General information
- Type: Civil utility aircraft
- Manufacturer: Homebuilt
- Designer: Leeon D. Davis
- Primary user: Private pilot owners
- Number built: ca. 45 by 1985

History
- First flight: 21 May 1966

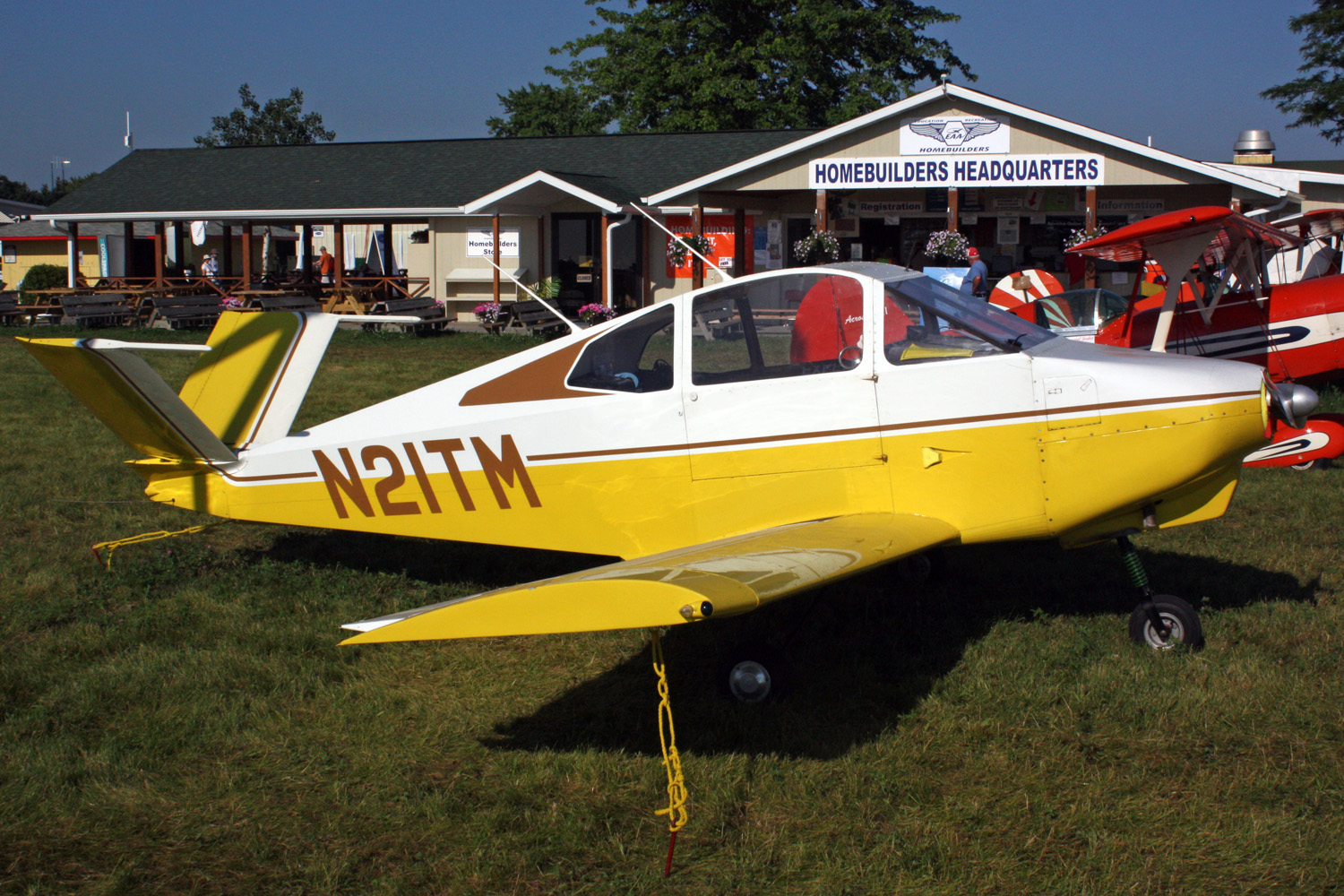
Davis DA-2 at Airventure 2008.

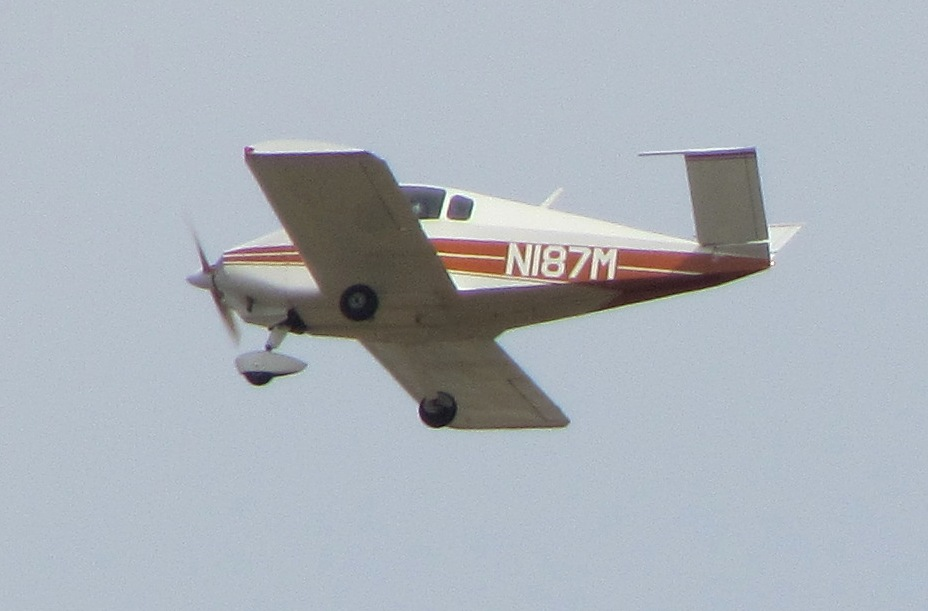
Davis DA-2A

The Davis DA-2 is a light aircraft designed in the United States in the 1960s and was marketed for homebuilding. While it is a low-wing monoplane of largely conventional design with fixed tricycle undercarriage, the DA-2 is given a distinctive appearance by its slab-like fuselage construction and its V-tail. The pilot and a single passenger sit side-by-side. Construction of the aircraft is sheet aluminum throughout, with the sole compound curves formed a fiberglass cowling and fairings.

The prototype made its first flight on May 21, 1966, and was exhibited at that year's Experimental Aircraft Association annual fly-in, where it won awards for "most outstanding design" and "most popular aircraft".

A major design consideration was ease of assembly for a first time home aircraft builder. Examples of this include: few curved components, a V-tail is one less control surface to build, and each wing is made from two sheets of aluminum with no trimming involved.

The DA-3 was a single DA-2 enlarged to accommodate four people. Work proceeded through 1973-74, but the aircraft was never completed.

Plans have been intermittently available over the years. They are as of August 2019, available from D2 Aircraft.

== Operational history ==
Examples of the DA-2 have been completed in the United States, Canada and the United Kingdom and are currently (2015) actively flying in those countries.

== Variants ==
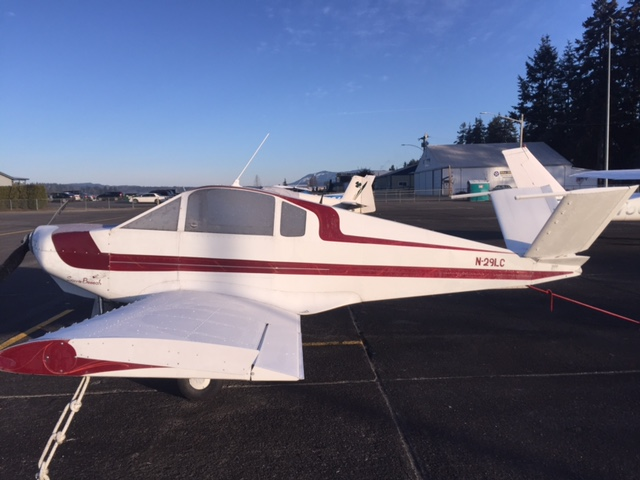
- 1979 Davis DA-2B
  DA-2 -- Continental A-65 powered
- DA-2A—Continental O-200A powered
- DA-2B—3 inch lower roof line
- DA-3
- DA-Bandit-Corvair powered

== Specifications (typical DA-2) ==
Data from Popular Mechanics August 1973

General characteristics

- Crew: One pilot
- Capacity: 1 passenger
- Length: 17 ft 10 in (5.44 m)
- Wingspan: 19 ft 3 in (5.86 m)
- Height: 5 ft 5 in (1.65 m)
- Wing area: 83 sq ft (7.7 m^{2})
- Empty weight: 610 lb (277 kg)
- Gross weight: 1,125 lb (510 kg)
- Powerplant: 1 × Continental A65 horizontally-opposed four-cylinder piston engine , 65 hp (49 kW)

Performance

- Maximum speed: 120 mph (193 km/h, 100 kn)
- Cruise speed: 110 mph (177 km/h, 96 kn)
- Range: 450 mi (725 km, 390 nmi)
