= C. A. L. Totten =

Early advocate of British Israelism

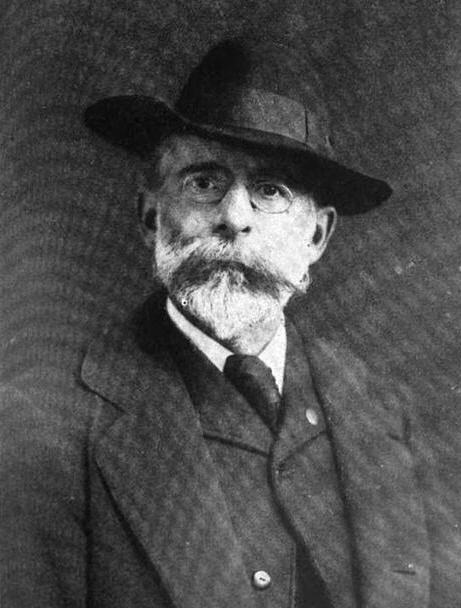
- Charles A. L. Totten
- Born: February 3, 1851; New London, Connecticut
- Died: April 12, 1908 (aged 57)
- Education: West Point
- Known for: Wargaming, British Israelism
- Notable work: Strategos

Charles Adiel Lewis Totten (February 3, 1851 – April 12, 1908) was an American military officer, a professor of military tactics, a prolific writer, and an early advocate of British Israelism.

== Early life ==
Charles Totten was born in New London, Connecticut, into a military family. His father, James Totten was a 1st lieutenant in the Army and would become a brigadier-general in the Missouri Militia during the American Civil War.

He attended Trinity College, graduating with an M.A. in 1869. While there, he was a member of the fraternity of Delta Psi (aka St. Anthony Hall).

Totten was appointed to the United States Military Academy at West Point on September 1, 1869. A year later, his father was dismissed from the Army for misconduct.

== Military career ==
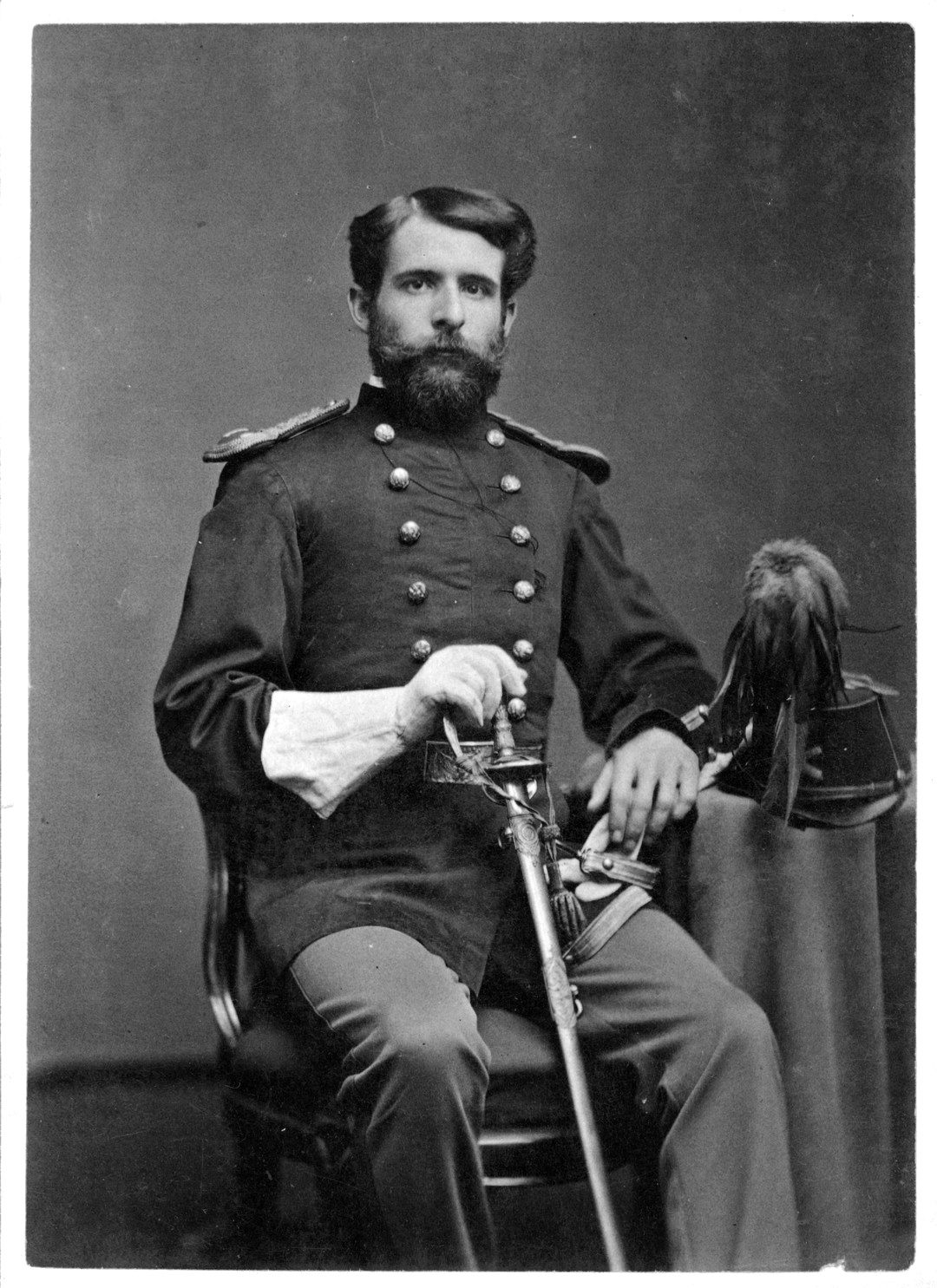
Charles A. L. Totten, ca. 1875

Totten graduated from West Point (where he had been an honor student) in June 1873. He was commissioned as a second lieutenant in the 4th Artillery Regiment. He was promoted to first lieutenant the next year. He would not be promoted again, however, due to slow promotions in the post-Civil War Army.

He taught military science and tactics at Massachusetts Agricultural College (now known as the University of Massachusetts Amherst) from 1875 to 1878. In this assignment he introduced fencing as a collegiate sport.

Charles Totten and W. R. Livermore are variously credited with being the first to bring the practice of wargaming from Germany to the United States. Totten's book Strategos, one of the first modern wargaming systems in the United States, was published in 1880.

In 1881 Totten participated in the Chiricahua Campaign against the Apaches in Arizona. For this service, Totten was entitled to receive the Indian Campaign Medal when it was established in 1907.

He was stationed at Fort Adams in Newport, Rhode Island from November 9, 1882, to August 1, 1883. He then served as Professor of Military Science and Tactics, Cathedral School of St. Paul in New York from August 4, 1883, until April 21, 1886. A strong opponent of the Metric System, he patented a system of weights and measures in 1884.

He was again assigned to Fort Adams, as well as serving as an advisor at Rhode Island Militia encampments, from May 30, 1886, until October 1, 1889. His last assignment in the Army was as Professor of Military Science and Tactics at Yale University from August 1, 1889, until 1892.

== Writing and publishing ==
After a leave of absence, Totten resigned his commission in August 1893 and settled in Milford, Connecticut with his office in New Haven. He devoted most of his remaining life to writing, chiefly on biblical chronology, biblical prophecy, the Great Pyramid, British Israelism, the symbolism of the Great Seal of the United States and other esoteric subjects.

He was a prolific author, writing over 180 books and articles, including a massive 26 volume series entitled "Our Race" defending British Israelism, and his writings continue to exert influence in some Christian Zionist circles. Totten's works were read and embraced by Mary Baker Eddy, the founder of the Christian Science Church. They were also an influence on Sibyl Marvin Huse, author and teacher/Reader of Christian Science.

As an active member of the International Institute for Preserving and Perfecting (Anglo-Saxon) Weights and Measures, Totten wrote its theme song, "A Pint's a Pound the World Around," in 1883, which is reproduced below.

1. "A pint's a pound the world around,"
We Anglo-Saxons claim,
So long it's stood to make it good
We Anglo-Saxons aim.
The "ancient landmarks" to preserve,
We've firmly set our face;
They show the footprints o'er the earth,
Of Khumry's wandr'ing race.

CHORUS:
Then swell the chorus heartily.
Let every Saxon sing:
"A pint's a pound the world around."
Till all the earth shall ring.
"A pint's a pound the world around"
For rich and poor the same;
Just measure and a perfect weight
Called by their ancient name!

2. They bid us change the ancient "names,"
The "seasons" and the "times;"
And for our measures go abroad
To strange and distant climes.
But we'll abide by things long dear,
And cling to things of yore,
For the Anglo-Saxon race shall rule
The earth from shore to shore.Chorus

3. So rally round your "Standards" all,
Come Saxons tried and true;
Aloud your "old traditions" call,
For time throughout they'll do.
Preserved and sacred evermore
The inch, and pint, and pound
Shall mete out justice to mankind
The rolling earth around. Chorus

4. Then down with every "metric" scheme
Taught by the foreign school.
We'll worship still our Father's God!
And keep our Father's "rule"!
A perfect inch, a perfect pint,
The Anglo's honest pound,
Shall hold their place upon the earth,
Till Time's last trump shall sound!

CHORUS:
Then swell the chorus heartily.
Let every Saxon sing:
"A pint's a pound the world around."
Till all the earth shall ring.
"A pint's a pound the world around"
For rich and poor the same;
Just measure and a perfect weight
Called by their ancient name!

At the second convention of the Anglo-Saxon Federation of America in 1931, Howard Rand announced that the federation had acquired Totten's unsold books along with cuts and printing plates from the Totten Memorial Trust. Rand used the federation to continue publishing Totten's work.

== Personal life ==
He was the grandfather of Lieutenant General William P. Ennis who served during World War II and the Korean War.

== Works ==
- Laws of Athletics and General Rules
- The gospel of history;: An interwoven harmony of Matthew, Mark, Luke, and John, with their collaterals, jointly and severally re-translated and consolidated word-by-word into one composite truth
- Joshua's Long Day and the Dial of Ahaz, a Scientific Vindication and "a Midnight Cry"(1890)
- The seal of history : our inheritance in the great seal of "Manasseh," the United States of America : its history and heraldry; and its signification unto "the great people" thus sealed (1897)
- An Important Question in Metrology: Based Upon Recent and Original Discoveries: A Challenge to "The Metric System." and an Earnest Word with the English-Speaking Peoples on Their Ancient Weights and Measures (1884)
- The Romance of History: Lost Israel Found; Or, Jeshurun's Pilgrimage Towards Ammi, from Lo-Ammi
- The Riddle of History, a Chronological Itinerary Through the Period of the Judges: Together with Other Biblico-Literary Excursus (1892)

== See also ==
- British Israelism
- Lost Ten Tribes
