= Dungeon! =

1975 boardgame

- Original 1975 box cover
- Other names: The New Dungeon! (1989); Classic Dungeon! (1992)
- Designers: David R. Megarry
- Publishers: TSR, Inc. (1975—1999); Wizards of the Coast (2012—present)
- Genres: Adventure
- Players: 1 to 8 or 12
- Setup time: 10 minutes
- Playing time: 90 minutes
- Chance: Dice rolling

Dungeon! is an adventure board game designed by David R. Megarry and first released by TSR, Inc. in 1975. Additional contributions through multiple editions were made by Gary Gygax, Steve Winter, Jeff Grubb, Chris Dupuis and Michael Gray. Dungeon! simulates some aspects of the Dungeons & Dragons (D&D) role-playing game, which was released in 1974, although Megarry had a prototype of Dungeon! ready as early as 1972.

Dungeon! features a map of a simple six-level dungeon with hallways, rooms, and chambers. Players move around the board seeking to defeat monsters and claim treasure. Greater treasures are located in deeper levels of the dungeon, along with tougher monsters. Players choose different character classes with different abilities. The object of the game is to be the first to return to the beginning chamber with a set value of treasure.

Dungeon! has been described as being one of the first adventure board games.

== Original edition ==
David M. Ewalt, in his book Of Dice and Men, described Megarry's original edition of the game as "a Blackmoor-inspired board game that represented TSR's most ambitious production to date: a color game map, customized cards, tokens, dice, and a rules booklet all packaged in an attractive box".

=== Artwork and game pieces ===
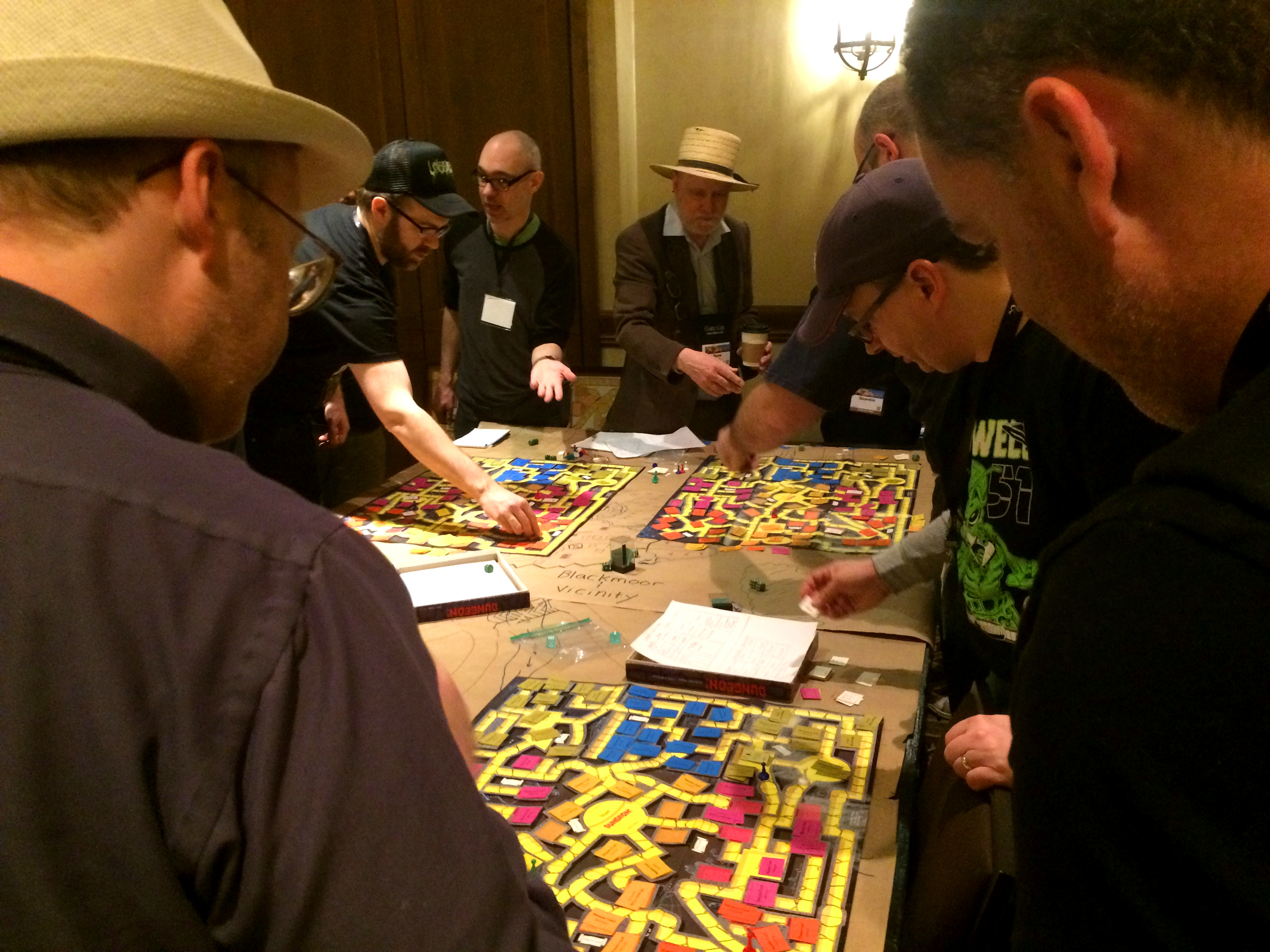
Dave Megarry leading a session of Dungeon! at Gary Con, using the original published edition.

The original edition of the game featured the rulebook, a folding vinyl cloth gameboard, four colors of Parcheesi-style playing pieces (white, blue, red, and green), a pair of six-sided dice, and an assortment of color-coded monster and treasure cards for the six levels of the dungeon. The artwork on the face of the cards was in black and white, while the backs were colored by level: gold for first, orange for second, red for third, magenta for fourth, green for fifth, and blue for the sixth level. The original (1975) game featured four character classes: the Elf, Hero, Superhero, and Wizard (the hero and superhero are warriors, with the superhero being more powerful). These were ordinarily represented by the green, blue, red, and white pieces respectively. The 1989 'New Dungeon' had six classes: the Warrior, Elf, Dwarf, Wizard, Paladin, and Thief. The 1992 'Classic Dungeon' had the same six classes. As there were multiple playing pieces, custom game variations could be set up with more than one of a given character class (using an arbitrarily-colored piece), but ordinarily a game involved players selecting different classes. In the 2012 version of the game, released under the Dungeons & Dragons brand name, the heroes are Rogue, Cleric, Fighter, and Wizard, allowing for up to 8 players.

- Original (1975): Elf, Hero, Superhero, Wizard
- New Dungeon (1989): Warrior, Elf, Dwarf, Wizard, Paladin, Thief
- Classic Dungeon (1992): Warrior, Elf, Dwarf, Wizard, Paladin, Thief
- Dungeon! (2012): Rogue, Cleric, Fighter, Wizard (Male and Female of each)
- Dungeon! (2014): Rogue, Cleric, Fighter, Wizard (Male and Female of each)

=== Gameplay ===
In the original edition, the monster and treasure cards were quite small, approximately 1.375 inches by 1 inch. At the start of the game, these would be randomized and placed face down to fill all the dungeon rooms, treasures being placed first, then monsters overtop. Additional monster cards were then placed in chambers, which were larger rooms at key intersections throughout the board. These monsters were placed three to a chamber, with only the top monster in the stack encountered when attempting to pass through a chamber.

Monster cards listed the minimum number totaled from two dice that had to be rolled in order to defeat the monster. If a player's roll to defeat a monster was lower than the required number, a second roll was made to see what happened to the player. The result of a player losing a battle could be any of the following:

- The battle might end in a standoff, with the player staying in the room unhurt.
- The player might be forced to retreat, losing one or two treasures in the process.
- The player might be forced to retreat and lose a turn.
- The player might be seriously wounded, losing all treasure and being placed back at the starting space.
- In dire cases, the player could be killed, losing all treasure.

If a player's initial attack failed, then death from the resulting monster attack had only a 1 in 36 chance, occurring only on a die roll of 2 (on two 6-sided dice). If a player died, he or she could start a new character at the starting space after losing a turn. If, after a battle, a player remained alive but was unsuccessful in defeating the monster, he or she could return to attempt to defeat the same monster, sometimes required to retreat, drop a treasure, and lose a turn.

Once a monster was defeated, any treasure card under the monster card became the possession of the victorious player. Treasure cards listed a gold piece value, and ranged from a 250 gold piece value Bag of Gold in the first level to the 10,000 gold piece value Huge Diamond deep in the sixth level. Some treasures, such as magic swords and crystal balls, altered gameplay; swords added to a player's hand-to-hand combat rolls, while crystal balls permitted players to forego a turn of movement and spend the turn looking at monster and treasure cards in a room without entering the room. These had the lowest gold piece value for treasures on a given level of the dungeon.

=== Dungeon levels ===
The six levels of the dungeon offered a range of difficulty in monsters corresponding with the range of value in treasure. First level monsters were generally the weakest, while sixth level monsters were generally the most powerful. A small number of monster cards were not monsters, but traps that either opened a slide that dropped the character encountering them into a chamber one level deeper, or held the character in a cage for a number of turns.

=== Character classes ===
Each class had particular advantages:

- The Hero was the basic "average" class. To win the game, the Hero would need to collect only 10,000 gold pieces (GP).
- The Elf had twice the probability of others to pass through secret doors, marked by dotted outlines in the dungeon (1 through 4 on a roll of one six-sided die, whereas all others required rolling a 1 or 2). To win the game, the Elf would need to collect only 10,000 gold pieces (GP).
- The Superhero was the toughest hand-to-hand fighter in the dungeon. Superheroes had to acquire 20,000 GP.
- The Wizard had magic spells, permitting the launch of fireball or lightning bolt attacks into rooms without entering hand-to-hand combat, and teleport spells to move quickly through the dungeon from one chamber to another. Wizards had to acquire 30,000 GP.

The amount of treasure required to win the game varied by character class- theoretically, this evened out the odds of winning the game, and allowed the less powerful characters to stick to the upper levels of the dungeon.

Although the Hero arguably had no advantages, given the weighted treasure requisites to win the game, the Hero packed the most punch for a character class requiring the least amount of treasure to win, being slightly tougher against most monsters than the Elf.

The Elf and Hero were best suited to the 1st and 2nd levels, but could occasionally venture to the 3rd level to get larger treasures. The Superhero was best suited to the 4th level, while Wizards needed to go to the 6th level to get enough treasure to accumulate the 30,000 GP they needed to win. The 5th level was rarely visited due to a combination of hard-to-access rooms and monsters that were difficult for an Elf, Hero, or Superhero to defeat and smaller treasures than the 6th level monsters that Wizards could kill.

=== House rules ===
Some players created their own character classes, such as Ultraheroes, Elf Wizards, and Spellwarriors. TSR also printed some official variant rules in the Strategic Review and Dragon magazine, giving extra cards and new character classes.

== Later editions ==
Rules containing new monsters and character classes were published in 1976. Revised editions of Dungeon! were published in 1980, 1981, 1989 and 1992. The original game had the versatility of a playing surface that could roll as well as fold and the advantage that the small monster and treasure cards could be easily laid out within the rooms depicted on the board. The constant throughout all the editions of Dungeon! was a quick simplified essence of the more complex Dungeons & Dragons environment.

Later editions also included rules for additional classes, each with unique advantages or rules and requiring different amounts of treasure to win the game.

Editions were also published in other countries including versions by Altenburger und Stralsunder Spielkarten-Fabriken playing card company in Germany and Jedko Games in Australia. The Jedko Games version closely resembled the original US edition but with a light cardboard map playing board instead of the cloth-vinyl one.

=== Wizards of the Coast editions ===
The 2012 Edition of Dungeon! was released by Wizards of the Coast (WotC) in 2012 under the Dungeons & Dragons brand. Featuring new artwork by Franz Vohwinkel, the game board and basic rules were returned to the original rule set, although the names of the hero classes were changed to Rogue, Cleric, Fighter, and Wizard.

The 2014 Edition ("Fifth Edition") of Dungeon! was released by WotC on June 24, 2014. The rules are unchanged from previous editions, but all of the art has been re-done in a more cartoony style.

== Video game ==
In 1982, an adaptation was released as Dungeon! for the Apple II. The Dungeon! computer game received a Certificate of Merit in the category of "1984 Best Multi-Player Video Game/Computer Game" at the 5th annual Arkie Awards.

== Reception ==
Fred Hemmings reviewed Dungeon! for White Dwarf #4, giving it an overall rating of 8 out of 10, and wrote that "even if you play D&D it is still worth having a game or two of Dungeon. You may argue that Green Slime is not as deadly as it is portrayed but a little thing like that shouldn't spoil your fun. If on the other hand D&D is not your cup of tea (or coffee), don't let the connections put you off, this is a game in its own right and a good one".

Forrest Johnson reviewed the 2nd edition of Dungeon! in The Space Gamer No. 38. Johnson commented that "whoever decided to make this simple game even simpler should have his brains impounded before he does more damage. [...] Recommended to rank beginners and the hopelessly drunk".

In the August 1989 edition of Games International (Issue 8), James Wallis reviewed the 1989 edition, retitled The New Dungeon! Game and noted that the components "are of a high quality" and "gameplay is straightforward". He gave the game an average rating of 3 out of 5, saying that "the game relies too much on rolls of the dice or the turn of a card, but this does not detract from its 'fun' potential".

In the 1980 book The Complete Book of Wargames, game designer Jon Freeman called this "a fine introduction to role-playing games, understandable by almost anyone, and helpful preparation for the far more complicated [role-playing games]". Freeman did find issues with the rules, pointing out that without the "Ambush" rules, there was no player interaction at all, but with them, "player interaction takes over the game completely, and no one ever gets anywhere". He also found issues with the balance of the various characters, finding some of them much more powerful than others. Freeman concluded by giving the game an Overall Evaluation of "Fair to Good".

Dungeon! was chosen for inclusion in the 2010 book Family Games: The 100 Best. Game designer Robert J. Schwalb explained that Dungeon! provides a strong foundation for playing D&D and is, more importantly, a lot of fun in its own right".

David M. Ewalt of Forbes commented on the 2012 edition of Dungeon!: "For just $20, the new Dungeon! is a great buy — a classic game reborn in an affordable, attractive package". William Niebling of ICv2 gave it 2 out of 5; while this version met his nostalgia fix, Wizards made no effort to fix any issues and added a new problem. Both Niebling and Ewalt found that the change in the cards size to be larger than the rooms forcing the use of place-holder markers to indicate were the monsters were located was a problem.

DieHard GameFan said that "this is definitely a game any fantasy fan should be on the lookout for – especially if you played one of the earlier editions as a child. Nostalgia abounds here".

In a retrospective review of Dungeon! in Black Gate, Andrew Zimmerman Jones said: "If you just want to go, kill some stuff, and get some treasure, without worrying about a ton of elaborate rules, this is the game for you. If you're looking for more than that – including some cool miniatures – then this isn't the game for you". In another review in Black Gate, James Maliszewski said: "I'm not sure I can truly sum up the vistas that Dungeon! opened up for us. Prior to that Christmas break, 'fantasy' was the realm of fairy tales and King Arthur's knights. There were monsters and there was magic, yes, but they were both of a narrow and limited variety. And, as I said, a dungeon was a place where a beautiful damsel or an unlucky hero might be held for a time, not a place one voluntarily entered seeking gold and glory. Now, nearly 35 years later, it's hard not to think of these things when I think of fantasy. How many other board games have so thoroughly changed a person's view of the world?" In another review in Black Gate, Bob Byrne said that "Dungeon! is the ancestor of all dungeon crawler board games. Descent!, Runebound, the Dungeons and Dragons Adventure Board Game line, Talisman, Dungeonquest, and Star Wars: Imperial Assault: these all find their roots in Dungeon! TSR had a major innovation in not one, but two areas of the gaming industry in 1974-1975".

== Other reviews ==
- Shadis #33 (1996)
- Games and Puzzles
- The Playboy Winner's Guide to Board Games
