= Sid Meier's Railroads! =

2006 video game

- Cover art by Michel Bohbot
- Developer: Firaxis Games (Note: Ported to OS X, Android, and iOS by Feral Interactive.)
- Publishers: 2K; Feral Interactive (OS X, Android, iOS)
- Designer: Sid Meier
- Engine: Gamebryo
- Platforms: Windows, Mac OS X, iOS, Android
- Release: Windows: NA: October 17, 2006; PAL: October 27, 2006; OS X: WW: November 1, 2012; iOS, Android: WW: April 5, 2023
- Genre: Business simulation game
- Modes: Single-player, multiplayer

Sid Meier's Railroads! is a business simulation game developed by Firaxis Games on the Gamebryo game engine that was released in October 2006 and is the sequel to Railroad Tycoon 3. Although Sid Meier created the original Railroad Tycoon, subsequent versions were developed by PopTop Software. Railroads! was the first game in the series since the original to have direct input from Sid Meier himself. After a visit to Miniatur Wunderland in Hamburg, Germany, Meier was inspired to reinvent his original creation. A version for the Mac OS X was published by Feral Interactive on November 1, 2012, under the latter's Feral Legends label. A mobile version was released in April 2023.

== Gameplay ==
Railroads! is fully three-dimensional and geared more toward head-to-head real-time strategy than the previous versions, resulting in it being less suited to single player play, and a less realistic simulation of railway operation. The terrain is more compressed in this game; there are few areas where players are allowed a long, straight run of track without earthworks or a bridge, meaning that terrain (such as hills, mountains, rivers and inlets) plays a more important role, at least in the early stages of a game.

A train transporting cargo

The game is heavily focused on economics – players have to build and sustain entire industries using the railroads they develop. Gameplay changes from previous editions of Railroad Tycoon include a system where new technology is first auctioned to the highest bidder. This gives the player a ten-year exclusive use of that technology. Similarly, individual industries are also put up for auction amongst players. However, the game does not have the dynamic pricing of goods across the entire map or cargo that can find alternate means of transportation if no train service is provided that were features of Railroad Tycoon III, and other simplifications compared to previous Railroad Tycoon games are that there is no separation of individual money from company money, nor the ability to raise money on an in-game bond market. Tracklaying is automated and much easier than other editions of Railroad Tycoon. When combined with the more "compressed" terrain, it allows for tactical placement of track to obstruct and frustrate opponents. However, players are limited to laying track in a contiguous system, which in turn reduces the impact of there being no network effects in the economics of the game. Another limitation is that trains do not keep to the right on a stretch of double track, meaning unrealistic blocking of the track by one's own trains is common if more than one train is allowed on a stretch of track.

Industries vary depending on the location and timeframe. European scenarios include Wine, Beer, and Dairy Products while Western United States scenarios focus on Oil and Gold.

The game also allows head-to-head play over a LAN and, prior to 2013 when GameSpy ceased online hosting services for multiplayer games, the Internet, supporting up to four players per game, either human or artificial intelligence.

=== Scenarios ===
Like the previous versions, Railroads! offers various historical scenarios, in regions such as the Southwestern United States, the Pacific Northwest, the United Kingdom, France, Eastern Europe, and Germany. In these scenarios (fifteen in all), the game allows the user to take on the role of various famous railway tycoons and robber barons from the past, such as Cornelius Vanderbilt and J.P. Morgan.

With the introduction of patch 1.1 a map editor could be enabled by editing one of the game's .ini files, allowing for the creation of custom maps by users.

== Critical reception ==
Reception

Aggregate score
Aggregator	Score
Metacritic	77/100

Review scores
Publication	Score
Computer Games Magazine	3/5
Edge	6/10
Eurogamer	7/10
Game Informer	8/10
GameSpot	8.1/10
GameSpy	3.5/5
Gamezebo	4/5
GameZone	7.8/10
IGN	8/10
Maximum PC	7/10
PC Gamer (US)	85%
The Times	5/5

The game received "generally favorable reviews" according to the review aggregation website Metacritic.

The Academy of Interactive Arts & Sciences nominated Sid Meier's Railroads! for "Simulation Game of the Year" at the 10th Annual Interactive Achievement Awards.

== See also ==
- Chris Sawyer's Locomotion
