= Book of Tables =

Book of Tables is a 1984 role-playing game supplement published by Avalon Hill for Powers & Perils.

== Contents ==
Book of Tables is a supplement in which an aid for both gamemasters and players is a comprehensive resource that organizes all the important tables from the main rules in a logical order. It comes with a pad of character record sheets and three gamemaster's screens, each dedicated to a specific aspect of gameplay: combat, magic, and encounters.

== Publication history ==
Book of Tables was written by Richard Snider with a cover by Jim Talbot and published by The Avalon Hill Game Company in 1984 as a boxed set containing a 48-page book, a pad of character sheets, and three cardstock screens.
