= Omegakron =

Tabletop role-playing game adventure

Omegakron is the final adventure published by Avalon Hill in 1984 for the multi-genre role-playing game Lords of Creation.

== Description ==
Omegakron is an adventure in which the Time Adjusters go to Omegakron (the pre-war site of Akron, Ohio) to determine the cause of a time flow shift that resulted in a nuclear war.

=== Components ===
The boxed set holds:

- 48-page book with the adventure
- five sheets of paper containing player aids
- a pad of blank character sheets

== Publication history ==
The multi-genre role-playing game Lords of Creation published by Avalon Hill in 1984 was designed by Tom Moldvay to allow the gamemaster to create adventures in almost any genre, from fantasy to science fiction to modern espionage. Moldvay also planned to write five adventures to support the game, but only three were published: The Horn of Roland (modern day horror), The Yeti Sanction (modern-day espionage), and finally 1984's Omegakron, a boxed set designed by Tom Moldvay, with art by Dave Billman.

== Reception ==
Mike Dean reviewed Omegakron for Imagine magazine, and stated that "In conclusion - as with the previous two [Lords of Creation scenarios] - nice scenario, shame about the price!"

== Other reviews ==
- Papyrus #11 (Summer 1993, p. 12)
- Heroes Vol. 1 #4 (p.43)
