= Perilous Lands =

Perilous Lands is a 1984 role-playing game supplement published by Avalon Hill for Powers & Perils.

== Contents ==
Perilous Lands is a supplement in which a campaign setting provides a comprehensive description of a fantasy continent. It includes:

- The Map Book: 32 pages of full-color maps detailing the continent.
- The Culture Book: 68 pages covering the history, geography, population, and government of more than 80 kingdoms, tribes, and city-states in the Perilous Lands.
- The Site Book: 36 pages describing 17 encounter sites for short adventure scenarios scattered throughout the continent.

== Publication history ==
Perilous Lands was written by Richard Snider with a cover by Jim Talbot and published by The Avalon Hill Game Company in 1983 as a boxed set containing a 68-page book, a 36-page book, and a 32-page book.

== Reviews ==
- Papyrus (Issue 10 - Spring 1993)
