= 1853 (board game) =

Railway-themed board game

1853 is a board game in the 18XX genre published in 1989 by Hartland Trefoil.

== Contents ==
1853 is a game in which an Indian railway is the setting.

== Publication history ==
1853 is the third part in a series of games from Hartland Trefoil that started with 1829 and 1830.

== Reception ==
Steve Jones and Brian Walker reviewed 1853 for Games International magazine, and gave it 3 1/2 stars out of 5, and stated that "Despite the reservations expressed about the physical quality of the components, and the one or two questions about the rules, I would recommend it to railway games enthusiasts. On balance, the wait has probably been worth it; a pity about the rather high price though."

== Reviews ==
- Strategy Plus
