= Heroes Magazine =

Heroes
- Editor: William E. Peschel; Richard Snider
- Categories: Role-playing games, Board Games
- Frequency: Bimonthly
- First issue: Jan/Feb 1984
- Final issue Number: Mar/Apr 1987; Vol. 2, No. 4
- Company: Avalon Hill
- Country: United Kingdom
- Language: English

Heroes is a role-playing magazine that was published by Avalon Hill.

== Contents ==
Heroes is a magazine in which Avalon Hill supported its role-playing games, including Powers & Perils, Lords of Creation, James Bond 007, and RuneQuest (acquired from Chaosium). Initially, it was expected to cover the company's full range of fantasy and sci-fi titles, but by the second issue, the editor clarified its focus on role-playing games only.

== Publication history ==
Shannon Appelcline noted that as Powers & Perils and Lords of Creation were failing by 1984, "Meanwhile Avalon Hill was rolling out more new roleplaying product: a magazine called Heroes. This house organ supported all four of Avalon Hill's roleplaying games, James Bond 007, Powers & Perils, Lords of Creation and a fourth roleplaying game which was then in preparation: the third edition of Chaosium's RuneQuest, which Eric Dott called the 'Cadillac' of the Avalon Hill game line." Appelecline also noted that "Heroes magazine ran 10 issues before being quietly cancelled in 1987."

== Reception ==
Scott Haring reviewed Heroes for Fantasy Gamer magazine and stated that "The graphics in this new magazine are quite good, with excellent maps (some in four color) and good use of color elsewhere. I wish there was more art, especially in the smaller articles (some of which had no art whatsoever). Overall, the magazine's a good value for those who play the games it covers; for those who don't, well . . . Avalon Hill isn't that interested in you, anyway."

Tony Watson reviewed the first two issues of Heroes for Different Worlds magazine and stated that "One cannot make authoritative judgments about a magazine after only two issues, but the indications are that Heroes will prove to be a valuable aid to players of AH's line of role-playing games. The magazine's appeal will be limited by the fact that it deals solely with AH products and apparently will in the future concentrate almost exclusively on role-playing games. Only afficianados of RuneQuest, Powers & Perils, James Bond 007, and Lords Of Creation will be interested in subscribing, but if AH can maintain the quality presented in the first two issues, Heroes would be a good bet for these gamers."

== Reviews ==
- Imagine #15
