= The Horn of Roland =

Tabletop role-playing game supplement

Cover art by Dave Billman, 1984

The Horn of Roland is an adventure published by Avalon Hill in 1984 for the multi-genre role-playing game Lords of Creation.

== Description ==
The Horn of Roland is designed as an introductory adventure for new players. The player characters start at a modern day science fiction convention where they are investigating a murder. Their investigation uncovers evidence of supernatural events in the world, and increasingly bizarre events happen as the characters follow the murder suspect through the Bermuda Triangle.

=== Components ===
The boxed set holds:

- 48-page book with the adventure
- five sheets of paper containing player aids, including local maps and a sketch of the murder scene

== Publication history ==
The multi-genre role-playing game Lords of Creation published by Avalon Hill in 1984 was designed by Tom Moldvay to allow the gamemaster to create adventures in almost any genre, from fantasy to science fiction to modern espionage. Moldvay also planned to write five adventures to support the game, but only three were published: The Horn of Roland, The Yeti Sanction (modern-day espionage), and Omegakron (post-apocalyptic science fiction).

The Horn of Roland featured art by Dave Billman.

== Reception ==
In Issue 22 of Imagine, Mike Dean was impressed and gave a strong recommendation, saying that "anyone seriously considering GMing [Lords of Creation] would be well advised to buy Horn of Roland only to see just how good an adventure can be!"

== Other recognition ==
- A copy of The Horn of Roland is held in the collection of the Strong National Museum of Play (object 110.21200).
- A copy of The Horn of Roland is held in the Edwin and Terry Murray Collection of Role-Playing Games, 1972-2017 (Box BG38) at Duke University.
