= Railroad Tycoon II =

1998 video game

- Developer: PopTop Software
- Publishers: NA: Gathering of Developers; EU: Take-Two Interactive
- Designer: Phil Steinmeyer
- Programmer: Phil Steinmeyer
- Composer: Jim Callahan
- Series: Railroad Tycoon
- Platforms: Microsoft Windows, Mac OS, Linux, PlayStation, Dreamcast
- Release: Windows: NA: November 2, 1998; EU: 1998; Macintosh: NA: September 20, 1999; Linux: NA: October 1999; PlayStation: NA: February 1, 2000; EU: April 21, 2000; Dreamcast: NA: July 31, 2000; EU: 2000
- Genre: Business simulation
- Modes: Single-player, multiplayer

Railroad Tycoon II is a business simulation video game in the Railroad Tycoon series developed by PopTop Software and published by Gathering of Developers. It was released for Microsoft Windows, Mac OS, PlayStation and Dreamcast. It was later ported and released for Linux.

Gameplay is displayed in dimetric view, unlike the top-down view of Railroad Tycoon.

== Gameplay ==
In-game screenshot

Railroad Tycoon II is a railroad simulation that covers the entire history of railroads from inception to the present day and beyond. The player chooses a map and assumes the role of chairman of a railroad company. The player tries to make profits for investors and completes various other objectives while being hindered by rivals, random events such as train breakdowns, train robbers, economic swings, and scripted events particular to the scenario.

Most of the gameplay consists of building tracks, stations and trains, which are used for hauling passengers and freight from one station to another. Delivery revenue varies by time, distance, demand, cargo type, economic state, station improvements and difficulty level. Companies can connect to and use each other's tracks and stations, with revenue being split. Expenses include fuel, track and engine maintenance and overhead. The fuel cost depends on the cargo weight and the distance each engine runs. Engine maintenance depends on engine age and the engine's type (some locomotives cost more to maintain than others). Track maintenance is solely calculated from track mileage.

The player determines what kind of cargo(es) to load and unload at each station that they add to a train's schedule. Way-points may also be inserted to override default track selection where multiple paths are possible.

There are many industries in the game, and each can produce and/or convert specific cargoes. For example, coal mines produce coal, iron mines produce iron, and steel mills convert 1 load of iron plus 1 load of coal into 2 loads of steel. The players are encouraged to find a chain of production to make new cargo by hauling the right type of cargo to each step of the industries. By discovering the correct combinations, the player can haul raw materials one way, "create" manufactured return cargo, and make even more money hauling finished products back the other way.

=== Locomotives and industry ===
One of the key elements of gameplay relates to the player purchasing and operating a variety of locomotives, each of which possesses different attributes relating to speed, fuel type, preferred cargo, and the ability to traverse hills and steep track grades. In general, the player should balance the cost of operating a train and the time required to transport cargo, with the balance being that the profit from cargo delivery outweighs train operating costs. The player also may purchase various industrial plants to earn extra money based on the amount of cargo received and delivered. Basic industry, such as bakeries, textile mills, and tool and die factories, earns less profit than advanced factories such as canneries, steel mills and automobile plants, although the latter require multiple goods delivered to produce one final product. Furthermore, idle industries which do not produce goods will generate a negative profit, thus increasing overall operating costs and overhead.

Which locomotives are available depends on the time period and scenario. All locomotives begin their operational lives with a set chance of mechanical failure, with some types more prone to breakdowns than others. Breakdown percentage chance increases the older a locomotive becomes. A train may also suffer a wreck, which completely destroys the locomotive and all hauled cargo.

=== Economics ===
Gameplay also includes financial manipulation of companies, issuing bonds, share repurchases, stock issues, manipulating dividends, merging with other companies and declaring bankruptcy. These features are required in some scenarios and may be used for either great financial gain or total fiscal disaster.

In normal financial mode, the player may buy or sell any companies' stocks at various prices depending upon the economy.

The economy may fluctuate during gameplay, with five economic states possible: Booming, Prosperity, Normal, Recession and Depression. When the economy is good, the revenue of hauled goods and stock prices will be higher. Bond interest rates will also be adjusted with the economy level, including the interest received from cash and the interest paid for the bonds.

=== Campaigns and scenarios ===
The original game features eighteen missions, divided between North America, Europe and the rest of the world. The missions can be played on three difficulty levels, and each also includes three listed objectives. Completing only the first objective awards the player a bronze medal, the first two a silver medal, and all three a gold medal. The player may play any mission in each set as many times as they wish; they may also continue even though a mission has been failed. The final score for the whole 18-mission campaign is calculated by the difficulty level and the number of each type of medal achieved.

In addition to the campaign, Railroad Tycoon II features many single scenarios. As with the campaign, each scenario is based on a geographical location, which may be fictional. Most scenarios also have a medal system similar to that of the campaign, although any scenario may be played in sandbox mode as well. Many scenarios constrain the player to some specific point on the timeline and feature scripted events: for example, the Korean map presents an alternative history as the player is informed about the averted Korean civil war.

Additional single scenarios may be created using the map editor included. Maps may be imported, drawn from scratch, or edited from existing maps and saved under new names. Many fan creations have been shared on various fan sites.

== Development ==
In late 1997, Bruce Shelley said of his chance of developing Railroad Tycoon II, "I would be happy to work on such a game but there are real doubts about its ability to generate sufficient sales in this blockbuster market where a few of the games make most of the money."

The soundtrack of Railroad Tycoon II consist mostly of classical "railroad" blues and bluegrass from the era the game revolves around. These pieces were not, unlike most contemporary games, midi files, but rather high-quality studio recordings; some even with vocals. This fact has contributed to the solid ratings this game has received.

=== Editions and ports ===
The Second Century is an expansion pack released in 1999 for Windows and Macintosh. Railroad Tycoon 2: Gold is a collection of the main game, the expansion pack, and 12 new scenarios. Railroad Tycoon 2: Platinum is equivalent to the Gold Edition but with over 50 community-made maps, enhanced mouse-wheel support, and an electronic version of the strategy guide. Scenarios developed specifically for Platinum may not function in some earlier versions. The Dreamcast version released in 2000 has remade 3D graphics and all the scenarios from the main game and the expansion pack and some new scenarios.

Tremor Entertainment developed the Dreamcast port, which released on July 31, 2000. This replaced the original 2D graphics with new, full-3D ones.

== Reception ==
Reception

Aggregate score
Aggregator	Score
Metacritic	89/100 (PC); 81/100 (DC)

Review scores
Publication	Score
Computer Gaming World	4.5/5
GamePro	4/5
Official U.S. PlayStation Magazine	3/5
PC Gamer (UK)	86%
PC Gamer (US)	92%
PC Zone	78/100
Computer Games Strategy Plus	4.5/5
PC PowerPlay	91%
Next Generation	4/5

Awards
Publication	Award
Computer Gaming World	Best Strategy (finalist)
PC Gamer US	The Best Real-Time Strategy Game (finalist)
Computer Games Strategy Plus	Strategy Game of the Year
GameSpot	Strategy Game of the Year (finalist)

=== Sales ===
Before its release, Gathering of Developers' marketing director estimated that Railroad Tycoon would sell 250,000 units during the 1998 holiday shopping season. He speculated lifetime sales of 500,000 units. The game proceeded to become a commercial success. Its sales surpassed 500,000 copies globally by February 1999, and its computer version alone sold more than 1.5 million copies by August 2001. In the United States, the game and its Gold edition together sold 351,000 copies by October 2001. According to Franz J. Felsl of PopTop, much of Railroad Tycoon II's success came from European markets; he explained that it "did better in Europe than it did in the US, which is not the way things usually end up."

By August 2000, Railroad Tycoon II had been released in 39 unique SKUs worldwide, including eight Windows versions in English alone. PopTop's Phil Steinmeyer wrote that roughly 33% of the game's sales were derived from the Gold edition and Second Century expansion, and that the port for Macintosh "sold respectably", while the PlayStation version was unsuccessful. He accredited the game's number of versions with its commercial success, and wrote in August 2000, "Overall, had we only released the original game, in English, for Windows only, our sales would be less than a quarter of what they are now." In 2003, Steinmeyer remarked that Railroad Tycoon II continued to sell "pretty well".

The Dreamcast version in the U.S. sold 24,379 units.

=== Awards ===
Railroad Tycoon II won Computer Games Strategy Plus's and CNET Gamecenter's 1998 "Strategy Game of the Year" awards; the former magazine's editors wrote that it "capture[d] almost all of the things gamers had come to love about the original." It also received IGN's "Best Soundtrack" award. The game was a finalist for Computer Gaming World's 1998 "Best Strategy", GameSpot's "Strategy Game of the Year", IGN's "Best Strategy Game of the Year" and PC Gamer US's "The Best Real-Time Strategy Game" awards, all of which ultimately went to StarCraft. Computer Gaming World's editors lauded Railroad Tycoon II as "a brilliant update of a gaming classic", and the staff of PC Gamer US wrote that the game "did a terrific job of immersing the player in a richly detailed world of empire-building, commerce and micro-management."

In 2000, the PlayStation port of Railroad Tycoon II received a nomination for GameSpot's "Best Simulation Game" prize among console games, which went to Theme Park World.

=== The Second Century ===
GameSpot praised The Second Century as a difficult but good addition to the game noting that the challenges required players to come up with new strategies and gave it an 8.4 out of 10 rating.

Reception

Aggregate score
Aggregator	Score
GameRankings	84.11% (9 reviews)

Review scores
Publication	Score
PC Gamer (UK)	87%
PC Zone	83/100
Computer Games Strategy Plus	3.5/5

== Legacy ==
Railroad Tycoon II became the first game published by Gathering of Developers to sell 1 million copies, and Geoff Keighley of Computer Gaming World declared it one of the publisher's few "certified hits." In the United States, the publisher's combined lifetime sales reached 1.3 million copies by October 2001, including the sales of Railroad Tycoon II. Gathering of Developers president Mike Wilson believed that the game put his company on the map, at a time when others in the computer game industry doubted that an independent publisher could succeed.

It was featured in G4 Icons' episode 12 Sid Meier as part of Sid's history with games and computers.

A sequel, Railroad Tycoon 3, was released in October 2003.

As of 2012, Railroad Tycoon II was used in staff training by a major Turkish railroad company.
