= Tower of the Dead =

Tabletop role-playing game adventure

Tower of the Dead is the only adventure published by Avalon Hill in 1984 for the fantasy role-playing game Powers & Perils.

== Description ==
Tower of the Dead is a boxed set that contains a 56-page adventure book, and a cardstock gamemaster's screen.

=== Plot summary ===
Through a four-part adventure, the player characters become aware that the lich Nilgeranthrib seeks to become ruler of Thaliba, and they will need to destroy the lich to prevent this. The four parts of the adventure take place in the city of Porta, near the city, on the road, and in the Tower of the Dead for the final confrontation with the lich.

== Publication history ==
Avalon Hill entered the fantasy role-playing game market with Powers & Perils in 1983. Sales were poor, and only two supplements and one adventure were published. The adventure was 1984's Tower of the Dead, a boxed set designed by Richard Snider, with artwork by Rick Barber, Winchell Chung, Michael Creager, and Bob Haynes.

Publication of Powers & Perils and its products was discontinued in 1985.

== Reception ==
In issue 24 of Imagine, Mike Dean noted the relatively high price of Tower of the Dead, but still recommended it, saying "Tower of the Dead is a formidable challenge to any experienced group of P&P players and is recommended in spite of what may seem to be a high price."
