= Richard Snider =

Game designer

- Born: 29 August 1953; Albuquerque, New Mexico
- Died: 17 November 2009 (aged 56); Mint Hill, North Carolina
- Occupations: Game designer, author

Richard Leonard Snider (August 29, 1953 – November 17, 2009) was a game designer who worked primarily on role-playing games, prominently including Adventures in Fantasy and Powers & Perils.

== Early life and introduction to role-playing games ==
Richard Snider was born to Leonard and Elizabeth Snider, one of ten children, in Albuquerque, New Mexico. After moving to Minnesota, he and his brother John joined the Midwest Military Simulation Association gaming group, where he met Dave Arneson, David Wesely, Ken Fletcher, Dave Megarry, and others. Snider was also one of the players in the original Blackmoor gaming group that Arneson ran. He contributed many suggestions for rule revisions and additions, and Arneson dedicated an entire section of his The First Fantasy Campaign, published by Judges Guild in 1977, to Snider's contributions.

== Career ==
In 1974, Richard's brother John designed Star Probe, a science fiction role-playing game that was published by TSR. In 1977, Richard, John, Brian Blume and Greg Svenson co-authored an expansion to Star Probe titled Star Empires, also published by TSR.

In 1978, Snider coauthored the role-playing game Adventures in Fantasy with Arneson, published by Excalibre Games and then through Arneson's company Adventure Games. In 1981, Snider also contributed to Thieves' World by Chaosium.

Snider then designed a role-playing game for Avalon Hill titled Powers & Perils. It was scheduled to be released at Origins 1983; however the convention instead featured empty rooms where demos for the game were supposed to be held, and the game was not released until early 1984. In addition to designing two supplements for Powers & Perils and the adventure Tower of the Dead that were all released in 1984 by Avalon Hill, Snider also authored several supplemental articles that appeared in Avalon Hill's shortlived role-playing game magazine Heroes, including the adventure Doom Manor. Sporting a much higher price tag than industry powerhouse Dungeons & Dragons, Powers & Perils languished, and Avalon Hill dropped the project in 1985.

Snider became a self-employed landscaper, and also wrote several novels, although only one, The Leather Rose, was published.
