= Railroad Tycoon Deluxe =

1993 video game

Sid Meier's Railroad Tycoon Deluxe
- Developer: Microprose (MPS Labs)
- Publisher: MicroProse
- Series: Railroad Tycoon
- Platform: MS-DOS
- Release: 1993
- Genre: Business simulation
- Mode: Single-player

Sid Meier's Railroad Tycoon Deluxe is an enhanced version of the 1990 business simulation game Railroad Tycoon. It was developed and published by MicroProse and released in 1993 for MS-DOS.

== Gameplay ==
The deluxe version of Railroad Tycoon adds VGA graphics and new continents South America and Africa, and 11 new trains. It also adds new historical periods: two more for the Eastern and Western United States, and one more for Europe. It takes into account drastically falling stock prices to improve the depth of the economic model. Train Bandits were included in the North American scenarios, which attempt to prey on mail cargo.

== Reception ==
Screenshot

Computer Gaming World stated in 1993 that "Railroad Tycoon Deluxe enhances an already classic game in ways that veteran players will appreciate and novice players will adore. It is a strategy game par excellence, one that can be enjoyed even by those not enamored by railroads".

Paul C. Schuytema for Compute! said "Railroad Tycoon Deluxe basically puts a pretty face on an otherwise solid game [...] if you never played the original, this is one rail line you'll want to hop aboard."

Paul Lakin for PC Zone said "Railroad Tycoon is one of the must buy games, so if it is still not in your collection, then Railroad Tycoon Deluxe ought to be on your shopping list."

PC Player of Germany gave the game a score of 92 out of 100. Aktueller Software Markt, also of Germany, gave the gave a total score of 10 out of 12. French magazine Tilt gave the game a score of 88%. Finnish magazine Pelit gave the game a score of 93 out of 100.
