= Shattered Union =

2005 video game

- North American cover art
- Developer: PopTop Software
- Publisher: 2K
- Designers: Franz Felsl; Daniel Eichling
- Programmer: Brent Smith
- Artist: Todd Bergantz
- Composers: Mason B. Fisher; Rick Fox
- Platforms: Microsoft Windows, Xbox
- Release: NA: October 17, 2005; EU: October 21, 2005
- Genre: Turn-based tactics
- Modes: Single-player, multiplayer

Shattered Union is a turn-based tactics video game developed by PopTop Software and published by 2K in October 2005.

== Plot ==
The narration of the game, including its backstory and its cutscenes, is provided by Sara Kestelman.

In 2008, David Jefferson Adams becomes the 44th President of the United States following a disputed election and a tie vote in the Electoral College (and subsequent tie-breaker by the United States House of Representatives), becoming the most hated and unpopular president in U.S. history.

A combination of foreign terrorist attacks and poor economic conditions contributes to civil unrest. As a result, rioting springs up all throughout the United States, with domestic terrorism becoming an increasing threat. In response, President Adams uses the Homeland Security Act and declares martial law on many areas of the country, but it is particularly concentrated on the West Coast.

Four years later, during the 2012 United States presidential election, the Supreme Court of the United States disqualifies all the popular presidential candidates from several states, effectively handing Adams his reelection. The public reacts violently when incumbent Adams accepts a second term.

During the Inauguration Ball in Washington, D.C., on the night of January 20, 2013, a low-yield tactical nuclear weapon is detonated in an apparent groundburst, presumably having been concealed there in advance. The yield is sufficient to destroy most of the city, killing Adams, his cabinet, and most of the U.S. Congress, effectively wiping out the presidential line of succession and thrusting the already unstable United States into total chaos.

The European Parliament meets in an emergency session, and votes to send peacekeepers to the Washington Metropolitan Area to secure international interests and protection of European citizens in the United States. As secessionist sentiment rises in America, the governor of California declares home rule, and California secedes from the Union on April 15, 2013. Texas follows a few days later, on April 17, 2013, taking neighboring states with it and re-forming the Republic of Texas. The Confederate States of America is reborn shortly afterwards, declaring independence, as does the Pacific Northwest following attempts by Californian militias to march into Oregon. At some point Hawaii also becomes independent. The Great Plains are the last to breakaway, leaving the remainder of the original government operating as a loose confederation in New England. By 2014, all hopes for a peaceful resolution are gone, and the Second American Civil War begins.

Early in the war, Russia invades and occupies Alaska, using the expanded military operations of the European Union as an excuse. The invasion is personally led by President Nicholai Vladekov, an ex-general and former Soviet hardliner, who claims that Alaska was never really part of the United States and that Russia is merely reclaiming its former territory. What little resistance does occur is confused and disorganized, making the invasion largely unopposed.

Later, Interpol reveals the results of its investigation regarding the Inauguration Day bombing. President Vladekov had been dealing weapons on the black market for more than thirty years and masterminded the D.C. bombing as part of his goal to disrupt the world economy so that Russia could regain its military dominance, and more easily control Europe. Protests throughout Russia force Vladekov to declare martial law in Moscow.

After the former contiguous United States is unified under one faction, the independent Commonwealth of Hawaii agrees to join the new government. Vladekov refuses to cede control of Alaska, so the faction's forces prepare to invade the state and drive the Russians out of North America. A closing cinematic depicts the aftermath of the war.

If the invasion fails, the reunified U.S. is still suffering unrest and faces an uncertain future. If the invasion succeeds and the player's faction has a very good reputation, the troubled American states are "united again under uncommon greatness" – a leader whose merciful acts, strategic, and tactical brilliance will be spoken of for centuries to come. If the player's faction has a very bad reputation, the U.S. transforms into a new fascist state, "one that will never again feel the sting of dissent".

=== Factions ===
The factions in the game include the entirety or portions of the following states:

- California Commonwealth: Arizona, California, Nevada, Utah
- Commonwealth of Hawaii: Hawaii (non-playable faction)
- Confederacy: Alabama, Florida, Georgia, Kentucky, Louisiana, Mississippi, North Carolina, South Carolina, Tennessee, Virginia
- European Union Occupation: Delaware, District of Columbia, Maryland, New Jersey, Pennsylvania, Virginia
- Great Plains Federation: Illinois, Indiana, Iowa, Kansas, Michigan, Minnesota, Missouri, Nebraska, North Dakota, South Dakota, Wisconsin
- New England Alliance: Connecticut, Maine, Massachusetts, New Hampshire, New Jersey, New York, Ohio, Pennsylvania, Rhode Island, West Virginia, Vermont
- Pacifica: Colorado, Idaho, Montana, Oregon, Washington, Wyoming
- Republic of Texas: Arkansas, New Mexico, Oklahoma, Texas
- Russia: Alaska (only multiplayer)

== Gameplay ==
The game is based on a hex grid system. The various factions wage warfare in numerous territories. The player's income is based on how many territories they control. When attacking a territory, the player selects which of their units to deploy on the deployment screen. Units deployed to one area cannot be redeployed to another until that round of attacks is over. Each side can choose to either manually place their units on the battlefield or have the computer do it for them automatically.

In each area, there are various forms of terrain, each with a unique effect on how units move. Roads enable much faster movement but decrease the unit's defense. Forests, mountains, swamps, and other such terrain greatly decrease unit movement, but most increase defense. Cities have little effect on a unit's movement unless a road runs through it, but they increase units' defense. If not crossed at a bridge, rivers heavily hinder or block unit movement. Two units, enemy or allied, can never occupy the same hex at once.

During combat, one unit directly engages another, without outside interference from any other units. The attacking unit always fires first. If the defending unit is still alive, it retaliates. Without special abilities, each unit can only attack and retaliate once per turn. Anti-air units always retaliate against air units as long as they survive the opening attack.

Each unit type has an effectiveness rating against infantry (EI), vehicles (EV), and air units (EA). If the attacker's effectiveness rating is higher than the defender's, damage is done according to subtracting the values. Otherwise, no damage or extremely low damage is done. Some units are specialized to only be able to attack a single type of unit. If enough damage is done to a unit, it is destroyed.

The objective of the battle is either to destroy all the enemy's units or capture enough objective towns to control the battlefield. Objective towns each have a point value. Special abilities, known as "sidebar powers", recharge over time and are gained based on the game is played – for example, by causing collateral damage.

Shattered Union also supports online multiplayer. For the Xbox version, multiplayer on Xbox Live was available to players until April 15, 2010. The game is now playable online again on the replacement Xbox Live servers called Insignia.

== Reception ==
Reception

Aggregate score
Aggregator	Score	
Aggregator	PC	Xbox
Metacritic	67/100	66/100

Review scores
Publication	Score	
Publication	PC	Xbox
Eurogamer	N/A	6/10
Game Informer	4/10	4/10
GameRevolution	C+	N/A
GameSpot	7.9/10	7.8/10
GameSpy	3.5/5	3.5/5
GameZone	7.8/10	N/A
IGN	7.5/10	7.8/10
Official Xbox Magazine (US)	N/A	4.5/10
PC Gamer (US)	68%	N/A
The A.V. Club	C+	N/A

Shattered Union received "average" reviews on both platforms according to the review aggregation website Metacritic. The gameplay was praised as being "simple but deep", and the concept was well liked, while criticisms included unbalanced AI and a total lack of any diplomacy features.

== Legacy ==
=== Film adaptation ===
In 2009, Variety and Gamasutra reported that Jerry Bruckheimer was creating a movie adaptation of the video game to be distributed by Touchstone Pictures. J. Michael Straczynski was set to write the script.
