= Lords of Creation (role-playing game) =

Multi-genre role-playing game

- Designers: Tom Moldvay
- Publishers: Avalon Hill
- Years active: 1983–1984
- Genres: Role-playing game
- Systems: Original
- Chance: Dice rolling

Lords of Creation is a multi-genre tabletop role-playing game published by Avalon Hill in 1983. Although expectations were high when Avalon Hill entered the role-playing game market, the game failed to find an audience and was discontinued relatively quickly.

== Description ==
Lords of Creation is not set in a single genre but is designed to allow players to play their characters through scenarios in settings varying from fantasy to science fiction to modern espionage. Characters gain powers and skills as they progress, including magical abilities and high-tech cybernetics. Their progression leads to demigod status – eventually powerful characters become "Lords of Creation", with the ability to create their own pocket universe.

A player whose character advances to level of "Lord of Creation" can then take on the role of gamemaster, refereeing the game in their character's pocket universe.

=== Components ===
The boxed set contains

- a 64-page rulebook
- a 64-page Book of Foes containing a bestiary, as well as historical figures and examples of other Lords of Creation
- a 20-sided die, a 10-sided die, and a 6-sided die

== Publication history ==
Avalon Hill was the industry leader in board wargames in the 1960s and 1970s, so when the company announced a foray into the world of role-playing games, the assumption was that they would become a leader in that field as well. Avalon Hill's strategy was to release a very complex game and a simpler game, somewhat akin to TSR's strategy with the complex Advanced Dungeons & Dragons (AD&D) and the simpler D&D Basic Set. The complex game was Powers & Perils, released in 1983. Game historian Shannon Appelcline called it "a grave disappointment" and quoted one reviewer who stated that it "add[ed] nothing to the genre of fantasy roleplaying games."

Avalon Hill's second prong of their role-playing strategy, released a few months after Powers & Perils, was the multi-genre Lords of Creation, designed by Tom Moldvay, well-known in the industry for his work at TSR on the second edition of the D&D Basic Set as well as several notable D&D adventures. Moldvay's creation was released as a boxed set, with art by Jean Baer, Dave Billman and Bob Haynes. In comparing it to Powers & Perils, Appelcline called it "a more playable, simpler game."

Avalon Hill announced that five adventures would be published for Lords of Creation:

- The Horn of Roland (1984), an introductory adventure that starts at a modern-day science fiction convention and eventually leads to the Bermuda Triangle.
- The Yeti Sanction (1984), a modern-day espionage scenario involving the kidnapping of the American Secretary of State. The adventure also includes a gamemaster's screen, and expanded rules for vehicles.
- Omegakron (1984), a post-apocalyptic science fiction adventure set in Akron, Ohio after a nuclear war. This module contains a pad of blank character sheets.
- The Tower of Ilium
- The Mines of Voria

However, the last two adventures were never published. Poor sales of both Lords of Creation and Powers & Perils led to the discontinuation of both games by the end of 1984.

== Reception ==
In Issue 6 of Fantasy Gamer, Warren Spector thought the game was "hopelessly mediocre — good at some things but great at none." However, he realized that the game might be of value for players new to role-playing games.

Jeff Seiken reviewed Lords of Creation for Different Worlds magazine and stated that "Interestingly enough, when a player reaches the title of Lords of Creation, he gains the ability to create worlds; in other words, he can gamemaster adventures in settings of his own devising. There is a peculiar, though somehow appealing, logic in the idea of a role-playing game in which the players' ultimate goal is to become gamemasters themselves. The rulebook, however, fails to address one central question - just who or what are these would-be Lords of Creation? They obviously do not qualify as your run-of-the-mill humans, but the two books attempt to provide no rationale, no raison d'etre for these individuals, and gamemasters will have to supply their own explanations. In the absence of this very basic element, Lords Of Creation stands as a game without a conscience, seeming to advocate in its place a simple message of adventuring for adventure's sake. Nonetheless, I can think of far worse reasons to spend an evening role-playing."

Mike Dean reviewed Lords of Creation for the British games magazine Imagine, and stated that "All in all, LoC is a powerful new concept in RPGs and should do well in sales."

In his 1990 book The Complete Guide to Role-Playing Games, game critic Rick Swan called the rule that allowed an advanced player character to actually become the gamemaster "the game's most interesting feature." Otherwise Swan called this game "not an exceptional RPG", noting that the game "mixes the elegant with the awkward." Swan felt that "there's simply too much ground to cover in too little space; if the referee wants to create an adventure with a time-traveling theme, he'll need a lot more than what's given here." Swan concluded by giving the game a rating of 2.5 out of 4, saying, "For those willing to put up with some murky ideas, Lords of Creation can be an interesting game, unpredictable, and decidedly eccentric."

In a retrospective review on the website Black Gate, Ty Johnston called Lords of Creation "very much a game of its time, but in many way it's also a game ahead of its time [...] one of the earliest to stretch beyond the boundaries of any single genre."
