= Dr. Ruth's Game of Good Sex =

1985 board game

Dr. Ruth's Game of Good Sex is a 1985 board game published by Victory Games.

== Gameplay ==
Dr. Ruth's Game of Good Sex is a game in which a lighthearted board game allows couples to earn points, answer playful questions, and enjoy humorous, informative dialogue about sexual awareness.

== Reviews ==
- Casus Belli #33
- Games #72
