= 1835 (board game) =

1835 is a railroad operations and share trading board game in the 18XX series, designed and published by Hans im Glück in 1990.

== Gameplay ==
The game board covers most of Germany. It was the first 18XX game use the concept of 'minor' companies, which operated like the normal stock companies (with some limitations) but are owned by a single person like a private company.

== Publication history ==
1835 was designed and published by Hans im Glück in 1990 and distributed in the United States by Mayfair Games.

== Reviews ==
- Strategy Plus
