= 5th Fleet: Modern Naval Combat in the Indian Ocean =

1989 board game

5th Fleet: Modern Naval Combat in the Indian Ocean is a board game published in 1989 by Victory Games.

== Contents ==
5th Fleet is a game in which modern naval combat in the Indian Ocean and Persian Gulf is covered at the operational level.

== Reception ==
Mike Siggins reviewed 5th Fleet for Games International magazine, and gave it a rating of 9 out of 10, and stated that "I feel Joe Balkoski has again struck a workable balance between playability and realism, probably the most difficult of all design tasks, while still providing enough detail and atmosphere to satisfy all but the rivet-counters."

== Reviews ==
- Casus Belli #56
