= 1829 (board game) =

Board game

- 1st edition box cover, 1974
- Players: 2-9
- Setup time: 10 minutes
- Playing time: 6 hours
- Chance: None
- Age range: 12+
- Skills: Strategy

1829, later called 1829 (South), is a board game published by Hartland Trefoil in 1974 that simulates railroad operations and trading of company shares. The game was the first in what became known as the 18xx series of railway games that has engendered over 250 licensed titles.

== Description ==
1829 is a board game for 3–9 players set in 1829, the start of the railway era in the UK. Each player attempts to buys shares in various railway companies and become a company director who manages operations, in order to make money. The player with the most personal money when the bank goes broke is the winner of the game.

== Gameplay ==
Each turn is divided into a stock-buying and stock-selling phase; and an operations phase, when land is surveyed, railways are built, revenue is collected from operational lines; and, at the company director's discretion, dividends are distributed to shareholders. The player with the most shares in a company becomes the company director until such time as someone else buys more shares than the current director owns.

There are three levels of gameplay: the simple game, the intermediate game, and the full game.

=== Components ===
- The game board, a hex grid map of Wales and southern England
- 100 cards representing shares in ten different companies
- Cards representing trains capable of servicing from 2 to 7 stations
- Money, which can be used as personal money or company money — the two must be kept separate
- Hexagonal counters representing various types of track (straight, shallow curve, etc.) There are limited numbers of each type of track, and sometimes directors may not be able to build track along a desired route due to a lack of the proper counters.
- Nine plastic mountains
- Nine envelopes, each with a numbered card from 1 to 9, to randomly draw for seats around the table.

== Publication history ==
In the early 1960s, Francis Tresham, looking to create a game to play with friends, first came up with the idea of a railway and stock game called Mainline. Although the game originally had a generic map, Tresham decided the game lacked a touch of reality, and placed it onto a map of southern England. He later decided to change the name from Mainline to 1829 to be more historically accurate. After twelve years of playtesting, 1829 was published by Hartland Trefoil in 1974.

In 1981, Hartland Trefoil released 1829 Northern Board, the same game but with a map of northern England and Scotland. This is usually called 1829 (North), while the original game is now referred to as 1829 (South).

In the mid-1980s, Tresham began to license the concept of the "stocks and railways" game to other companies. The first was 1830, a game designed by Tresham but published by Avalon Hill in 1986. This rapidly led to other licensed titles set in various countries and at various times. At last count the number of licensed games was over 250.

1829 also inspired Sid Meier to create Railroad Tycoon.

== Reception ==
In Issue 39 of the UK magazine Games & Puzzles, British game designer Steve Jackson called the game "remarkable in that it combines both the financial and the operational aspects of the railways in a highly original way." He did warn players "Don't start the game in your tea break. It really is a colossus, a complete game lasting anything over 6 hours." He noted that although complex, the complexity was not because of too many rules, but because "there are simply a large number of play options with rules dictating each." He concluded by giving the test panel's rating of 4 out of 6, but commented that "The overall rating reflects a wide divergence of opinions of the members of the panel."

In Issue 2 of Games International, Alan Moon, game designer of Ticket to Ride, wrote that if he had to be a castaway on a desert island with only ten board games to entertain him, "The northern board of 1829 would definitely go. As many times as I've played this, I've never seen the same game twice. Better yet, this is one of those games that thrives on being played by the same group over and over."

Jan Feringa, writing for Brutus, thought the game was too expensive, and at 8 or more hours per game, far too long. Despite this, Feringa concluded, "1829 is a beautifully executed game that requires the winner to negotiate well, manage his stock portfolio well, and be adept at laying railroad tracks. I think it is very positive that beginners also have a reasonable chance of winning."

In the book Eurogames: The Design, Culture and Play of Modern European Board Games, Stewart Woods described the game as a "watershed in game design".

== Reviews ==
- Games #35
- 1983 Games 100
- 1984 Games 100
