= 18XX =

Board games based on 19th century railroads

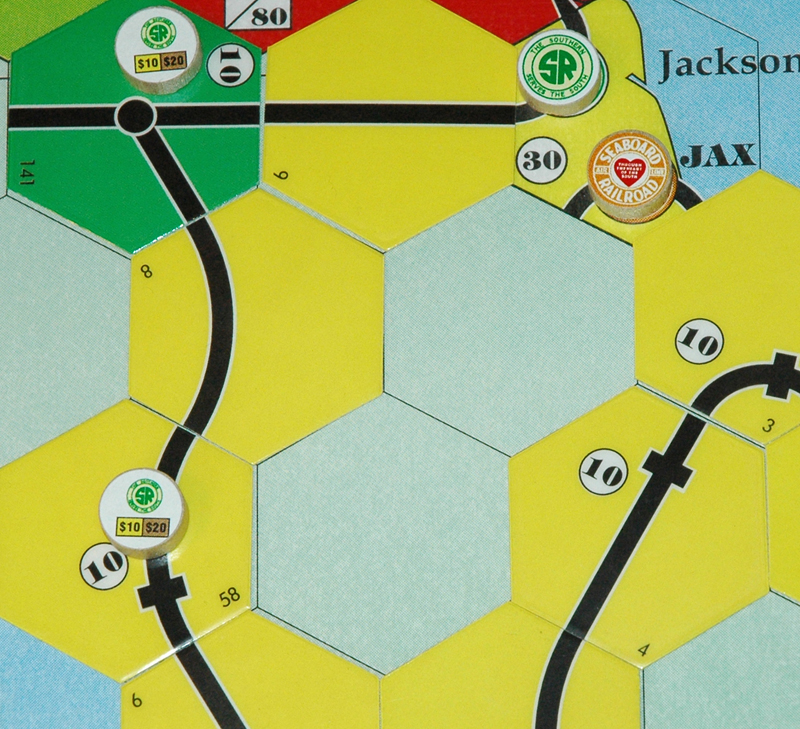
A game of 18FL in progress, depicting the gameboard with track tiles and station tokens.

18XX is the generic term for a series of board games that, with a few exceptions, recreate the building of railroad corporations during the 19th century; individual games within the series use particular years in the 19th century as their title (usually the date of the start of railway development in the area of the world they cover), or "18" plus a two or more letter geographical designator (such as 18EU for a game set in the European Union). The games 2038, set in the future, and Poseidon and Ur, 1830 BC, both set in ancient history, are also regarded as 18XX titles as their game mechanics and titling nomenclature are similar despite variance from the common railroad/stock-market theme.

The 18XX series has its origins in the game 1829, first produced by Francis Tresham in the mid-1970s. 1829 was chosen as it was the year of the Rainhill Trials. 1830 was produced by Avalon Hill in 1986, and was the first game of the series widely available in the United States; it is seen as the basic 18XX game by the U.S. audience.

In addition to traditionally published games, the 18XX series has spawned self-published variants and games published by low-volume game companies.

With few exceptions (such as 2038), 18XX titles are multiplayer board games without random variables in their game mechanics.

== Gameplay ==
=== Common features ===
18XX games vary, but most follow this general pattern:

- The objective is to enhance personal wealth, not the assets of any companies a player may be operating. Personal wealth consists of cash, listed company shares (which increases wealth both by receiving dividends and by capital appreciation), and other investments (such as private companies).
- Players don't directly interact with the game board, but do so indirectly through companies they control. Generally, the player who owns the most stock of a company is the president of that company and makes all decisions on behalf of that company. The president is also often required to help fund the company when it lacks sufficient funds to satisfy a mandated expense (such as owning a train by the end of its turn).
- Game play alternates between "stock rounds" and one or more "operating rounds". In a stock round, players buy and sell stock (some games have company actions during a stock round as well), while in an operating round players take actions on behalf of companies they control, including laying track, placing station tokens, operating trains, withholding income or paying dividends, and buying trains.
- "Certificate limit": there is usually a limit to how many corporate shares and private companies a player may own, to keep the game competitive by preventing snowball effects resulting from early leads by some players.
- The "President's certificate" (or "Director's certificate") represents control of a railroad corporation, usually represents a greater percentage of corporate stock than other certificates (e.g., 20% as opposed to 10%), and is usually the first one purchased for a company (with its purchaser setting the price, or "par value", for regular shares of stock in many titles in the series). If another player accumulates more shares in a company than the current president, they acquire the President's certificate (with attendant side-effects for both players regarding certificate limits) in exchange for their own lesser shares, and becomes the new controller of the corporation.
- Certain games may impose restrictions on the order in which companies may be started (generally to impose a historical context upon the game), and they vary in how many shares must be purchased before the company may operate ("floats").
- The map is usually a hex grid that depicts cities and terrain features. Hexagonal "track" tiles (representing available land-rights) are laid on top of this map to represent the growth of railroad networks, and tokens are placed on the board to represent stations (as well as special abilities from private companies). Cities have values which can vary based on which tiles have been laid on the city, the phase of the game, their historical importance to a corporation, or type of train used to reach them. Different color tiles are available in succession, and in phases that are typically determined by the first purchase of a more advanced type of train.
- A company's stock price is adjusted based on the revenues earned and whether the president chose to pay dividends or to withhold the earnings in the company treasury. Stock prices are usually also affected by actions in the stock round, and some games have other mechanisms that affect the stock price.
- Scarcity (forcing future-turn planning by players) of available corporations, shares thereof, train types, and track tiles.
- Trains eventually become obsolete and must be replaced by more-expensive trains that also have greater capacity for earning revenue. Purchase of a new type of train usually triggers other phase-changes in the game, such as the obsolescence of older trains, the availability of different sets of tiles, increased valuation of certain non-tiled cities, closure of private companies, and the ability to merge corporations or form them at higher valuations.
- Game end is usually determined when the bank runs out of money, and also by player bankruptcy (when a player cannot pay the debt of a company they control). Some games do not end when a player goes bankrupt, while others add other conditions for ending the game such as when a stock reaches a certain value on the stock market, or the most advanced type of train has been purchased. Other games do not feature bankruptcy at all, and enable a player to place a moribund company in "receivership", or be incorporated into a government railway, and walk away from debts.

=== Differences ===
While adhering to common similarities (see preceding section), each 18XX game differs from the others in subtle or significant ways in rule set as well as game map. As with games in general, each individual mechanic has probably been used before, but a new game can put together a set of mechanics which provide a new and interesting challenge. Some typical areas of difference are:

- Initial Auction – there are many different ways to distribute initial private companies and starting major corporations.
- Private Companies – most 18XX games have private companies which are entirely owned by one player, and represent the earliest companies in the game and/or provide special abilities. "Privates", as they are called, generally do little other than provide revenue, but in some games they control access to or enhance the revenue of certain hexes on the map. Some games have very similar private companies, some have very different private companies, and some dispense with having private companies at all. Some titles (e.g., 1835 and 1861) also have Minor Companies, which are again owned entirely by one player but play a more dynamic role than Privates.
- Corporation Funding – some games have full funding for a corporation as soon as it floats, while others have the company receiving money only as each share is sold. Some games require the corporation to reach a historically relevant destination in order to receive some of its capital or earn the best level of income.
- Company Types – some games have multiple company types. These types may vary based on how many shares are available for purchase, the funding model for the company, the number of station tokens available, or which types of trains may be purchased by the company.
- Corporate mergers and demergers – some games feature optional, or forced, mergers or splits of one or more companies.
- Corporate stock-ownership – some games enable companies to hold their own stock, purchase private corporations, and/or own the stock of other companies (even to the point of owning or as prelude to merger).
- Financial Tools - in addition to buying and selling stock certificates, some games feature other financial tools like taking loans, shorting stock, or letting companies issue and redeem shares of their stock.
- Train Types – some may offer multiple types of trains with distinct capabilities or lifetimes.
  - Some trains may "degrade" into other train types upon certain events (for example, delayed obsolescence of 4-trains in 18MEX, or normal trains becoming H-trains in 1844).
  - Trains may become available in unusual sequences. For example, in 1830, diesel engines are available as soon as the first 6-train is purchased — all the 6-trains are not required to be purchased first. In 1824, G-train availability is controlled by when normal trains are purchased.
  - Certain trains may be restricted in terms of which locations they may run to or may count revenue from, or they may provide bonuses for running to certain locations. For example, in 1844, H-trains are prohibited from running to off-board locations. In 1854, only Orient Express trains may run to certain off-board areas. In 1889, diesels get special bonuses for off-board locations. In 1826, E-trains and TGVs ignore dot-towns. TGVs in 1826 and 4D-trains in 18MEX double the value of cities they count. In 1824, only G-trains may run to mines and the corporation always gets the value of the mine rather than it being potentially paid to stockholders.
- Theme – a few titles eschew the common railroad/stock-market theme. For example, 2038 involves space exploration of the asteroid belt, while Ur, 1830 BC involves building dams and canals in ancient Mesopotamia (in the latter game, "corporations", "presidents" and stock "shares" are represented by kingdoms, rulers and parcels of land).

== Conventions and tournaments ==
A number of conventions have at least some emphasis on 18XX games, including the Chattanooga Rail Gaming Challenge, held in January or February in Chattanooga, Tennessee and run by Mark Derrick. 18XX games also figure prominently in various "RailCon" and "Puffing Billy" tournaments at many conventions.

== List of 18XX titles ==
The 18XX series is prolific, with many different publishers offering games and many fans designing and self-publishing titles in the series as well. The website BoardGameGeek lists 293 titles (including games and expansions) in the series as of January 2025. Not all of these titles are necessarily in production: many titles are only available as print-and-play games, offering rules and digital assets but requiring fans to print and assemble the games independently.

Due to the large number of games, the disparate designers and publishers, and the question of what constitutes a complete 18XX game, it is difficult to create an exhaustive list of all 18XX titles. This list contains the most notable titles from major publishers as well as some notable self-published 18XX titles.

1761: From Canal to Rail
Self-published in 2011, and then in 2017 by All-Aboard Games and designed by Ian D. Wilson. 1761 is set in England, with its early game focused on building canals and portrays the eventual fading away of canal companies as rail companies start to dominate.
1800: Colorado
Set in Colorado, the game was published in 2002 by David Methany in Rail Gamer magazine #17 and was later available in free print-and-play format. The game was designed by Antonio Leal. A mini-18XX game for 2–3 players, and consists of only nine playable hexes.
1817
Designed by Craig Bartell and Tim Flowers and published by Deep Thought Games in 2009 and subsequently by All-Aboard Games in 2012 and 2020. 1817, set in the United States, is well-known as one of the heaviest 18XX titles in term of complexity and game length. It offers a complex financial system with features such as market-driven interest rates, and company liquidations. An expansion, 18USA, published in 2017 (self-published), 2018, and 2021 (by All-Aboard Games) offers new contents and a randomizing of elements of the game.
1822: The Railways of Great Britain
Designed by Simon Cutforth and published 2016 by All-Aboard Games. Set in Great Britain, the game offers several unique features such as historical destinations for companies and new local trains. The game was the winner of "Golden Elephant Award" for "Best Heavy Game of 2016" by Heavy Cardboard.
1822CA
Designed by Robert Lecuyer and Simon Cutforth, and published 2018 by All-Aboard Games. This game, also strongly based on 1822: The Railways of Great Britain, takes place in Canada, features a larger number of private companies, and includes an innovative scale change halfway across the map to account for the larger expanse between cities in Western Canada.
1822MX
Inspired by 1822: The Railways of Great Britain, the game (set in Mexico) was designed by Scott Petersen and published by All-Aboard Games in 2019.
1822PNW
Designed by Ken Kuhn and published 2023 by All-Aboard Games and inspired by 1822: The Railways of Great Britain; takes place in the mountainous Pacific Northwest.
1824: Austria-Hungary
1824 was published by Double-O Games in 2005. The game was designed by Leonard "Lonny" Orgler and Helmut Ohley, and is set in Austria-Hungary. It is a smaller and simpler version of Lonny's 1837, and adds some ideas from his later 1854 and Helmut's 1844. Publisher Fox in the Box and Lonny Games re-implemented the game in 2019 under the title 1824: Austrian-Hungarian Railway.
1825
Great Britain, released 1995 (Unit 1) by Hartland Trefoil, 2000 (Unit 2) and 2004 (Unit 3) by Tresham Games, designed by Francis Tresham. The game has subsequently had many revisions, reprints, add-on kits and variants.
1826: Railroading in France and Belgium from 1826
1826 was published by Chris Lawson in 2000 and Deep Thought Games in 2004 and set in France and Belgium. As David Hecht's first design, it is the most conventional, and only one to use "traditional" green and brown plain track upgrade tiles. 1826 started out as "1830 on a different map", but rapidly evolved into a game of capital and technology management: the game's key decisions revolve around when to "grow" a company, and which trains to buy to optimize a company's final position.
1829 Mainline
England, released 2005 by Tresham Games, designed by Francis Tresham.
1829 (South) and 1829 (North)
1829 (South) was the first game in the 18XX series, published by Hartland Trefoil Ltd (UK) in 1974 from an original design by Francis Tresham. A second version, 1829 (North) was published in 1981. The game has subsequently had many revisions, reprints, add-on kits and variants.
1830: The Game of Railroads and Robber Barons
1830 was published by Avalon Hill in 1986, and its popularity led to the creation of many other 18XX games. The game has subsequently had many revisions, reprints, add-on kits and variants. The latest English editions were published in 2011 and 2021 by Mayfair Games and Lookout Games, respectively, under the title 1830: Railways & Robber Barons. Set in eastern United States.
1832: The South
1832 was published by Deep Thought Games in 2006. The game was designed by Bill Dixon and is set in the Southeastern United States. It retains the new rules Bill introduced in 1850 and 1870 for share price protection, stock redeeming, and reissuing, while adding new rules to model the mergers that shaped the South's railroads.
1835
1835 was designed and published by Hans im Glück in 1990 and distributed in the United States by Mayfair Games. The game board covers most of Germany. It was the first 18XX game use the concept of 'minor' companies, which operated like the normal stock companies (with some limitations) but are owned by a single person like a private company.
1837: Rail Building in the Austro-Hungarian Empire
Set in Austria-Hungary, self-published and designed 1994 by Leonard "Lonny" Orgler. It was subsequently republished in 2021 by All-Aboard Games.
1837 Saxony
The game, an updated version of 1837SX and 18SX by the same designer Wolfram Janich, was due to be published in 2022 by Spielworxx, but is now expected in 2026 under the name 18Saxonia. As the title suggests, it is set in the Saxony region.
1838: Rheinland
Designed and self-published by Wolfram Janich in 2003, and set in the Rhineland region. 18Rhl-Rhineland, a newer version, was published in 2007 by Marflow Games.
1839
Published in 1993 by Diabolo and designed by Paul Stouthard and Rob van Wijngaarden. Set in the Netherlands. The designers hand-made only 32 copies of the game.
1840: Vienna Tramways
Designed by Leonard Orgler and published through Lonny Games in 2020, the game is unique in that it focuses on the building of tram transport systems rather than heavy rails. It is set in Vienna, Austria. Also innovative is the availability of the best trains from the very start, albeit with reduced income as they grow older.
1841: Railways in Northern Italy
1841 was published by Chris Lawson in 1996. The game was designed by Federico Vellani with assistance from Manlio Manzini and is set in Italy. With its complicated financial rules and very steep train gradient (i.e., the trains get very expensive very quickly), it emphasizes stock manipulation and funding train purchases over route building.
1842: Schleswig Holstein
Self-published in 1992 by Wolfram Janich through Marflow Games and set in the Schleswig-Holstein province of Germany.
1844: Schweiz
1844 was designed and published by Helmut Ohley in 2003 and set in Switzerland. Peter Minder collected extensive background materials and drew the map. The game was republished (with revisions) as 1844/1854 in 2016.
1844/1854
A 2016 Mayfair Games and Lookout Games republishing and re-packaging of 1844 and 1854 in one box with various changes.
1846: The Race for the Midwest
1846 was published by Deep Thought Games in 2005, with a second edition by GMT Games in 2016. The game was designed by Tom Lehmann and is set in the Midwestern United States. It features a linear stock market (like 1829), N/M trains (which count N cities but may run through M total cities) and a simplified private company distribution. Another unusual feature is that the number of corporations, private companies, and the bank size all scale with the number of players, and the resulting game is shorter than most 18XX games.
1847: Pfalz
Set in the German Pfalz area, the game was self-published in 1996 by its designer Wolfram Janich. An Anniversary Edition was published in 2015.
1848: Australia
The game was published in 2007 by Double-O Games, designed by Helmut Ohley and Leonhard "Lonny" Orgler. It is set in Australia. 1848 was unique in that it includes the Bank of England as a public company that extends loans and administers railroads that are in receivership. A newer 2022 version was published by GMT Games.
1849: The Game of Sicilian Railways
Set in Sicily. The game was designed by Federico Vellani and released in 1998 by Chris Lawson. A newer 2021 version was published by All-Aboard games.
1850
1850 was published by Deep Thought Games in 2006. The game was designed by Bill Dixon and is set in the upper Midwestern United States. It retains the rules Bill introduced in 1870 for share price protection and stock redeeming/reissuing.
1851: Kentucky and Tennessee
Set in the Tennessee, the game was released 1998 by Chris Lawson, designed by Mark Derrick and Chris Lawson. It's a streamlined 18XX game designed for smaller groups with a shorter playing time.
1853
Set in India, designed by Francis Tresham, and published in 1989 by Hartland Trefoil. Mayfair Games and Lookout Games released a revised, newer version in 2009.
1854
1854 was published by both Leonard "Lonny" Orgler in 2002 and Deep Thought Games in 2005. The game was designed by Lonny Orgler and is set in Austria. It features a hexagonal stock market, local railways which operate on a smaller map (which takes place on two hexes of the large map), mail contracts, 150% capitalization, and player share options. There are also tunnels which allow you to build under other track and terrain features, such as avoiding small cities. The local railways eventually grow up to be regional railroads operating on the main map, and the tradeoff between getting good revenues on the local map versus getting locked out of important locations on the main map is an important decision to make. The game was republished (with revisions) as 1844/1854 in 2016.
1856: Railroading in Upper Canada from 1856
1856 was published by Mayfair Games in 1995 and was designed by Bill Dixon. The game is set in Upper Canada, including the upper reaches of the St. Lawrence River, and the Toronto to Detroit area for southern Ontario.
1858: The Railways of Iberia
1858 was designed by Ian D. Wilson, and published in 2012 by All-Aboard Games. 1858 is set in Spain and Portugal in the late 19th to early 20th centuries
1860: Railways on the Isle of Wight
Set in the Isle of Wight, the game was released 2004 by JKLM Games, designed by Mike Hutton. Z-Man Games published a second edition in 2010, and All-Aboard Games published the newest edition in 2022.
1861: The Railways of the Russian Empire
Set in Russia, the game was released by JKLM Games in 2006 and by All-Aboard Games in 2012. It was designed by Ian D. Wilson and features a non-player controlled government railway.
1861/1867: Railways of Russia/Canada
Published in 2020 as a package containing the two games 1861 and 1867 by Grand Trunk Games.
1862
1862 was designed and published by Helmut Ohley in 2000. The game covers the entire width of the United States and parts of Canada.
1862: Railway Mania in the Eastern Counties
East Anglia, England; designed by Mike Hutton and published in 2013. The game was famous for a few unique features; among them was petitioning the parliament as a mean to float new companies and three different train types available. It was re-released by GMT Games in 2019.
1865: Sardinia
Designed by Alessandro Lala and published by Gotha Games in 2011, 1865 is set in Sardinia and features the Dragon, a non-player foreign investor who trade in certificates between players. It also contains the Traffic system, which makes calculating company revenues easier.
1867: Railways of Canada
Set in Canada and designed by Ian D. Wilson, the game was originally set as an expansion to 1861 in 2015 (published by All-Aboard Games), but was released as a standalone game in 2017 by Grand Trunk Games.
1868
Set in Uruguay and designed by John Bohrer. As usual with Winsome 18XX games, a copy of 1830 is required to play, largely due to the need for the tiles. 1868 has a shorter playing time than 1830 and includes a number of little companies, a delayed fifth railroad and a bit of South American history. For 3-5 players for about 3 hours.
1870: Railroading across the Trans Mississippi from 1870
The game is set in the Mississippi Valley and central United States, released in 1992 by Mayfair Games, and designed by Bill Dixon.
Harzbahn 1873
Harzbahn 1873, set in the Harz mountains in Germany, was designed by Klaus Kiermeier and initially self-published in 2011 in German. It was later republished by All-Aboard Games in 2014 and 2021 in English, and by Marflow Games in 2017 in German. Harzbahn 1873 includes independent and public mining companies which can purchase trains as "machines" to improve their revenue and the revenue earned by train companies running past mines, a unique method of revenue calculation (a 4-train runs 4 connected routes of arbitrary length), and a maintenance mechanic that replaces train rusting.
1880: China
Set in China and designed by Helmut Ohley and Leonhard "Lonny" Orgler, this game was self-published through Double-O Games in 2010 and 2016. Lookout Games worked with the designers to republish a new third edition in 2022. The game is unique in that the turn order for companies are set along with the starting par price, and players could manipulate the Stock Round-Operation Round ratio.
1882: Assiniboia
Designed by Marc Voyer and published by All-Aboard Games in 2020, 1882 is set in the historical Assiniboia region of Canada and depicts the Canadian Prairies railway boom.
Shikoku 1889
1889 was published by both Wild Heaven Productions in 2004 and Deep Thought Games in 2006. The game was designed by Yasutaka Ikeda and is set in Shikoku, Japan. The rules for 1889 are essentially the same as 1830, except on a much smaller and terrain-heavy map and different privates. The goal is to make a quick and relatively simple game which explores the history of railroads on Shikoku. A new 2022 version was published by Grand Trunk Games.
1890
Set in Osaka metropolitan area, Japan, the game was designed by Shin-ichi Takasaki and released in 1999 by Nobuhiro Izumi.
1895 Namibia
Designed by Helmut Ohley and Adam Romoth and self-published through Double-O Games in 2004, the game is set in Namibia, one of the few 18XX titles to be set in the Africa continent.
1899
A variant of the 1830 played on a new map set in China and Korea. It was designed by Dirk Clemens and Ingo Meyer and released by Chris Lawson in 1994.
18??
A variant in a form of add-on kit for 1870 played on a somewhat larger fictionalized map, with additional privates and other rules variations. Designed by Allen Sliwinski and self-published by Scott Petersen through All-Aboard Games.
18AL
18AL was self-published by Mark Derrick in 1999 and later by John David Galt. It is set in Alabama, United States and aims to provide a quicker and simpler introduction to the 18XX series. It is very similar to 18GA.
18C2C
18C2C (aka Coast to Coast) was published by Designs in Creative Entertainment in 2003. The game was designed by Mark Frazier and covers the entire United States and Southern Canada. This is an extremely large game that attempts to model the entire history of railroading in the United States, and accordingly takes a long time to play. It consists of a 38"x68" map, 34 public companies, 18 private companies, and 108 trains.
18Chesapeake
The game, designed to provide a full 18XX experience for newcomers to the series, was published in 2020 by All-Aboard Games, and designed by Scott Petersen. It's similar to 1830, with a smaller map focused on the Chesapeake Bay area and a train export mechanic which improves gameplay pace.
18CZ
Designed by Leonard Orgler and published by Fox in the Box and Lonny Games in 2017, the game is set in the Czech Republic. It features three different corporation sizes with their own share size distributions. Each company sizes own different sets of trains, and larger companies can absorb smaller ones.
18Dixie with 18MS and 18GA
Published in 2015 by Deep Thought Games and designed by John Merrick, it is set in the Deep South US during the post-Civil War Reconstruction era. Also includes two upgraded smaller games: 18GA and 18MS.
18DO: Dortmund
Designed by Wolfram Janich and Michael Scharf and published by Fox in the Box and Marflow Games in 2020, 18DO focuses on both the development of railway around Dortmund and its burgeoning breweries.
18EU
18EU was published by Deep Thought Games in 2004. The game was designed by David G.D. Hecht, and is set in the heart of Europe, reaching from Paris and London to Rome, Budapest and Warsaw. 18EU is a compact game, played on four map panels. Unlike most 18XX games, there are no private companies, and before the sale of the first 5 train, share companies may only be started indirectly. When the game starts, fifteen minor companies (similar to the "forerunner" companies in 1835, 1837 and 1824) are auctioned off. These companies represent regional or private-sector rail companies. There are eight possible share companies, and before the first 5 train at least one minor company must be merged into a share company to form it.
18FL
18FL was published by Deep Thought Games in 2006. The game was designed by David G.D. Hecht and is set in Florida, United States. It is very similar to Mark Derrick's 18AL and 18GA in that it is a simple game intended as an introduction to the 18XX game system for new players. Unlike the two mentioned games, the "ultimate" train is a 6 (or a 3E) train. This means that 4 trains never become obsolete, and the greatest difficulty in a small game (and the greatest deterrent for new players), a massive "train rush" when permanent trains are first available, is substantially mitigated.
18GA
18GA was self-published by Mark Derrick in 1998 and later by John David Galt. It is set in Georgia, United States and aims to provide a quicker and simpler introduction to the 18XX series. It is very similar to 18AL. The game was republished in a package with 18Dixie in 2015.
18GB: The Railways of Great Britain
18GB was published by Deep Thought Games in 2018. It was designed by Dave Berry and is set in Great Britain. It combines elements of 1860 and 1830, and features a twist to the usual 18XX rules for laying tiles.
18GL
18GL was published by Deep Thought Games in 2006. The game was designed by Gary Mroczka and is set in the Great Lakes area of United States. It uses basically the same rules as David G.D. Hecht's 1826 (specifically, H-trains, loans, trainless companies get merged into a government railroad) except that there are no destinations, there is only one merger, and instead of TGV trains there are Diesel trains. The map is quite different, and the private companies have the effect of altering how the map develops depending on the combinations of private companies and corporations particular players get.
18GM: The 18XX GameMaster
Self-published in 1996 by designers Colin Barnhorst and Kristopher Marquardt. 18GM is an 18XX game development kit with modular boards which permits many different scenarios to be designed and played out.
18HeXX
A variable-geometry 18XX map system, designed and self-published in 2000 by Mike Schneider
18Ireland
Set in Ireland, the game was web-published in 2016 and designed by Ian Scrivins. It was republished in 2017 by All-Aboard Games.
18Kaas
Set in Utrecht, Netherlands, and self-published in 1992 by Erno Eekelschot through ERJO Games.
18Lilliput
Designed by Leonard Orgler and published by Fox in the Box and Lonny Games in 2018, this game was noted for its innovative elements which stayed true to the 18XX spirit but provides a fresh and light experience for players. Actions are picked based on a set of action cards in a common pool. As the title suggest, the game was set in the fictional land of Lilliput.
18Mag: Hungarian Railway History
Designed by Leonard Orgler and published by Lonny Games in 2021, 18Mag recreates the history of Hungarian railroads and companies. The game features, in addition to the usual operating railroad companies, seven service companies which provides special supporting effects to its owners. All trains are also available from the start of the game.
18MEX
18MEX was published by Deep Thought Games in 2005 and by All-Aboard Games as a second edition in 2020. The game was designed by Mark Derrick and is set in Mexico. The moderate length game features minor and major railroads, as well as government ones.
18MS: The Railroads Come to Mississippi
The standalone version of 18MS was published by All-Aboard Games in 2020 and designed by Mark Derrick. A lighter 18XX game set in Mississippi and Alabama. The older 2015 version was only available in the same package with 19Dixie.
18Namibia
Designed by Helmut Ohley and Adam Romoth. Reimplements 1895 Namibia.
18NEB
18NEB was published by Deep Thought Games in 2010. Designed by Matthew Campbell, it supports 2–4 players and plays in 2–4 hours. It is set in Nebraska, United States.
18NL
Set in Netherlands, the game was self-published in 1999 and 2005 by Wolfram Janich through Marflow Games. It uses the same system as 1830 over a new map.
18NW: Railroading in the "Great Northwest"
Designed and self-published by Gary Mroczka in 2017. Set in the US Pacific Northwest and surrounding areas.
18NY
Designed by Pierre LeBoeuf, published by Deep Thought Games in 2011. Set in the New York state and surrounding areas. All-Aboard Games will publish a new version in 2023 through its fifth Kickstarter wave of projects.
18OE: On the Rails of the Orient Express
Designed by Edward Sindelar and published by Designs In Creative Entertainment in 2014. The large game (rivaling those of the likes of 18C2C) covers the entire Europe and features a staggering five types of companies.
18SA
18SA, set in South America, designed by Peter Mette and published by Marflow Games in 2015, is a feature-rich and moderately complex entry in the 18XX series, such as different tokens for different kinds of trains, and extra costs for laying tracks across countries.
18Scan
18Scan was published by Deep Thought Games in 2005. The game, set in the Scandinavia, is one of the smaller 18XX titles, and was designed by David G.D. Hecht in order to introduce gamers to some of the more "exotic" systems used in other designs. 18Scan includes 1835-style minor companies, an 1835-style merger corporation, 1870-style destination rules (for the minor companies), 1856-style company flotation rules, and market-priced incremental capitalization rules as in 1851 and 1826.
18SJ: Railway in the Frozen North
Designed by Örjan Wennman and self-published in 2021 (with a newer edition publishing in 2023 by All-Aboard Games), 18SJ is set in the United Kingdoms of Sweden and Norway during the formative years of Nordic railways. The game features nationalization of public railway corporations.
18Svea
Designed by Jonas Jones and self-published in 2022. 18Svea is one of the smallest and fastest 18XX games around with less than two hours playtime taking place on a map with only ten hexes in total. Designed for two or three players.
18TN
18TN was published by Deep Thought Games in 2006. The game was designed by Mark Derrick originally in 1996, and upon discussions with Chris Lawson it was modified and published by Chris as 1851 in 1998. The two games were sufficiently different that the publication of the original was warranted. It is set in Tennessee.
18US
18US was published in 2006 by Deep Thought Games. The game, designed by David G.D. Hecht as an "advanced" 18XX game, is set in the continental United States. Unlike 18C2C or other, similar products, it is a very compact game: the entire "Lower 48" only takes up two map panels.
18VA
18VA was published by Deep Thought Games in 2005. The game, designed by David G.D. Hecht, is a smaller 18xx game, originally intended to be similar in scope to Mark Derrick's "one-state" games 18AL and 18GA. Set in Virginia and Maryland, it is slightly more complex than the two mentioned.
18West
18West was published in 2007 by Deep Thought Games. The game, designed by David G.D. Hecht, is set in the western United States. Many of the mechanics are quite different from other 18XX games, such as three different kinds of companies (including the Grange Road) and subsidized track laying. All-Aboard Games published a new version of the game in 2020.
2038: Tycoons of the Asteroid Belt
2038, by Tom Lehmann, has the game mechanics of an 18XX railroad game but with an asteroid mining theme. Its financial aspects are fairly similar to those of 1835, including a set of minor companies and a larger merger company. Its board features include asteroid mines that can be improved (the equivalent of cities), a small exploration reward for companies which explore asteroids (the equivalent of laying a tile, but requiring a spaceship/train), and two different types of corporations (those that start with full monetary assets and "growth companies", which start with fewer assets and a lower stock price but retain earnings from their unsold stock). The game was published in 1995 by Prism Games and TimJim Games.
21Moon
Published in 2020 by All-Aboard Games and designed by Jonas Jones, the futuristic game is set in 2117 on the Moon. Players must build a network of transportation to support the resource mining efforts on the Earth's natural satellite.
Poseidon
Set in the Aegean Sea during the Ancient Greece period, designed by Helmut Ohley and Lonny Orgler, with artworks drawn by Klemens Franz, and published through Lookout Games and Z-Man Games in 2010, is a shorter two-hours 18XX game with shipping lines instead of railroads.
Powerrails
Designed and self-published by Tom Schoeps in 1999. The game, based on 1830 and 1835, uses eleven small A4-sized map boards with only a handful of hexes and a small set of special rules for each of them.
Steam Over Holland
Set in the 1839 Netherlands, the game was designed by Bart van Dijk and published by Vendetta in 2007.
Railways of the Lost Atlas
Designed by Kevin Delger and Jacob Schacht, and published by Asterisk Games in 2024, RotLA features a variable-geometry modular board with divergent corporate abilities and mergers, with many variant options.
Ur: 1830 BC
The game is loosely adapted from the 18XX series, and features irrigation and kingdom management in ancient Mesopotamia. It was designed by Jeroen Doumen and Joris Wiersinga and published by Splotter Spellen in 2001. Its play centers around ownership of valuable networks, replacing the rail networks found in most 18XX games with irrigation canals, shares with parcels of land, companies with kingdoms, trains with irrigation technologies (such as reservoirs and pumps), and presidents with kings. Networks of canals and waterworks generate income by irrigating lands within kingdoms.
