= Railroad Tycoon (video game) =

1990 video game

Sid Meier's Railroad Tycoon
- Developer: MPS Labs
- Publisher: MicroProse
- Designers: Sid Meier; Bruce Shelley
- Composer: Jeff Briggs
- Series: Railroad Tycoon
- Platforms: MS-DOS, Amiga, Classic Mac OS, Atari ST, FM Towns, NEC PC-9801
- Release: WW: 1990
- Genre: Business simulation game
- Mode: Single-player

Sid Meier's Railroad Tycoon is a business simulation designed by Sid Meier. The game is the first in the Railroad Tycoon series. The original idea came from the boardgame 1830: The Game of Railroads and Robber Barons.

An expanded version of the game titled Sid Meier's Railroad Tycoon Deluxe, was released in 1993. A port of the game for the Super NES was planned for a 1994 release, and screenshots were shown in the March 1993 issue of Nintendo Power; however the port was never released. Though no reason was officially given, it may have been due to the MS-DOS release of Transport Tycoon, and its planned release on the then-upcoming PlayStation console. Likewise, a Mega Drive version was also planned but never released. The MS-DOS version of the game was released as freeware for download in 2006.

== History ==
The original idea and inspiration for the game was Avalon Hill's boardgame 1830: The Game of Railroads and Robber Barons, published in 1986 based on an original design by Francis Tresham. When Avalon Hill's president Eric Dott found out about the adaptation, he called Microprose founder Bill Stealey and said "Bill, you're doing my boardgame as a computer game." Bill replied, "I'm sorry," but Dott conceded, "Well, don't let it happen again."

== Gameplay ==
In-game screenshot

The objective of the game is to build and manage a railroad company by laying tracks, building stations, and buying and scheduling trains. The player acts as a railway entrepreneur and may start companies in any of four geographic locales: the Western United States, Northeast United States, Great Britain, or Continental Europe; the starting date varies depending on the map chosen. The company starts with one million dollars in capital, half equity, half a loan. The company may raise additional capital through the sale of bonds.

The player manages the business as described above and may also handle individual train movement and build additional industries. The game models supply and demand of goods and passengers as well as a miniature stock market on which players can buy and sell stock of their own or competing companies. The game also has other railroad companies attempting to put the player out of business with stock dealings and rate wars.

There are four types of stations: Signal Tower, Depot, Station and Terminal. The Signal Tower acts as a passing loop and may control movements. The rest service surrounding areas, with Depots serving the smallest area and Terminals the largest. The player can build at most 32 stations. When the player builds the first station they also build their first engine shop. Trains can only be built at engine shops. The player can upgrade and downgrade Depots, Stations and Terminals as needed, and can add other facilities such as stores and hotels.

Once the player builds a station they can build their first train (of the 32 permitted) at any engine shop. The player then can add cars to the train and send it on its way. The player can at any time change the consist, with options including mail and passenger cars as well as specialized freight cars for each of the game's nine other commodity types.

The player can continue to build the track network and build stations until they run out of funds. The game runs for a century, with accounting periods being two years long.

Not every station buys everything offered to it. Some goods producers buy nothing. There are two economic models the player can choose between: Simple Economy (where a station serving a large enough cities will buy anything) and Complex Economy (where cities will only buy certain products such as passengers and beer). The four geographical scenarios have different products available.

== Reception ==
Railroad Tycoon sold more than 400,000 units by September 1997.

In the July 1990 edition of Games International (Issue 16), Brian Walker gave the game a perfect score of 10 out of 10, saying, "Certainly this is one of the most captivating games I've ever played."

In the September 1990 edition of Computer Gaming World, Railroad Tycoon was named Game of the Year. In the next issue, M. Ryan Brooks gave the game five out of five stars. In 1992, Computer Gaming World added it to the magazine's Hall of Fame for games that readers highly rated over time.

In the December 1990 edition of PC Sources, Russ Lockwood called Railroad Tycoon one of the best games of the year.

In the January 1991 and October 1991 issues of Dragon, Patricia and Kirk Lesser awarded both the PC version and the Macintosh version perfect scores of 5 out of 5.

The editors of Strategy Plus declared it their 1990 game of the year.

The game won the 1991 Software Publishers Association Excellence in Software Award for Best Strategy Program.

In 1991, PC Format named Railroad Tycoon one of the 50 best computer games ever.

In 1994, PC Gamer US declared it the fourth best computer game ever.

In 1996, Computer Gaming World declared Railroad Tycoon the 41st-best computer game ever released.

In 1998, PC Gamer US declared it the 25th-best computer game ever released, and the editors called it "groundbreaking in every sense".
