= Francis Tresham (game designer) =

British board game designer (1936–2019)

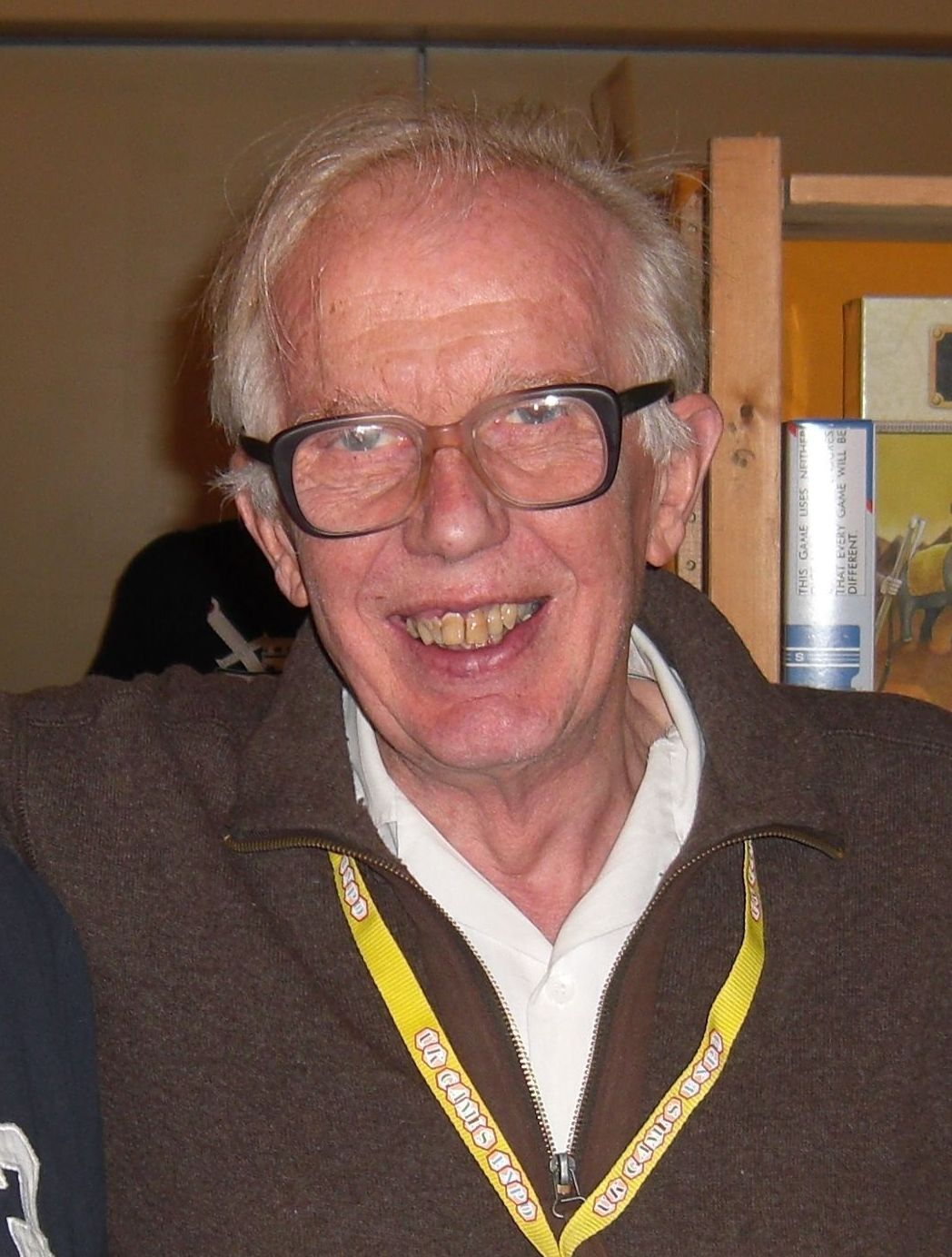
Tresham in 2011

Francis Tresham (1936 – 23 October 2019) was a British board game designer who produced board games since the early 1970s. Tresham founded and ran games company Hartland Trefoil (founded 1971), a company well-known for its Civilization board game, until its sale to MicroProse in 1997. His 1829 game was the first of the 18xx board game series and some of his board games inspired Sid Meier computer games such as Railroad Tycoon.

Francis Tresham was the first to introduce a technology tree into his boardgames. This idea had a large influence on later board and computer games.

He was managing director of Tresham Games, which produced 18xx-style board games. In 2013, he was one of the first inductees in the UK Games Expo Hall of Fame. He died on 23 October 2019.

== Published board games ==
- 1825
- 1829
- 1829 Mainline
- 1830
- 1853
- Civilization
- Revolution: The Dutch Revolt 1568–1648
- Shocks & Scares
- Spanish Main
- The Game of Ancient Kingdoms
