= Adventures in Fantasy =

Tabletop fantasy role-playing game

- 1979 Excalibre edition
- Designers: Dave Arneson and Richard Snider
- Publishers: Excalibre, Adventure Games
- Publication: 1979, 1981
- Genres: Tabletop role-playing game

Adventures in Fantasy is a role-playing game published by Excalibre Games in 1979, designed by Dave Arneson and Richard Snider. The game is a fantasy system, similar to early Dungeons & Dragons (D&D), which Arneson co-created. It received mixed to negative reviews in game periodicals, including The Space Gamer, Ares, and Pegasus, and ultimately flopped. Arneson later bought the rights to Adventures in Fantasy and published a new edition in 1981 through his own company Adventure Games.

== Publication history ==
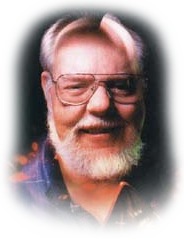
The game was designed by Dave Arneson (pictured) and Richard Snider.

Dave Arneson has been working on Adventures in Fantasy as early as 1976. It was co-designed by Richard Snider. A playtest edition was published by Excalibre Games in 1978 as a limited edition of 164 photocopied pages; each page contains two pages of manuscript printed side by side.

Adventures in Fantasy was then published in 1979 as a boxed set containing a 64-page book, two 56-page books, three cardstock sheets, and a die. Since Arneson departed from TSR in 1976, lost involvement in D&D and developed rivalry with Gary Gygax, he hoped to clear up some confusions and incompleteness early D&D had, and to gain market share and recognition with this game. However, Advanced Dungeons & Dragons beat it in doing so. To accommodate a higher price tag than its competitors, many copies of the game were signed by Arneson and Snider. Today, it is actually rarer to find unsigned copies of the game.

Arneson later bought back the rights to Adventures in Fantasy using money he acquired from a settlement with TSR, and his company Adventure Games released a new edition of the game in 1981. Adventures in Fantasy was one of several games that the Thieves' World RPG (1981) included rules for.

== Game system ==
Adventures in Fantasy is a fantasy system, similar in many ways to early Dungeons & Dragons. Characters may be warriors or magic-users; magic is handled on a spell-point system. Movement is miniatures-oriented (speed in inches, etc.). Character creation, combat, and setting up campaigns are covered in the "Book of Adventure" (64 pages); spells and nonhuman races are detailed in the "Book of Faerry and Magic" (56 pages); and the "Book of Creatures and Treasure" (56 pages) contains just that.

== Reception ==
Ronald Pehr reviewed Adventures in Fantasy in The Space Gamer No. 30. Pehr commented that "D&D might had 'contradictions and confusions' as Mr. Arneson points out on page 1 of Adventures in Fantasy, and he may be correct that 'Any person without the aid of an experienced player was hard pressed to even begin to gain an understanding of the rules...' However, we now have other games which aren't full of confusion, offer some excellent role-playing, and can be handled by beginners, and don't cost [as much as this game]!"

Eric Goldberg reviewed Adventures in Fantasy in Ares Magazine #4 and commented that "AIF would seem to have many things against purchasing it. The price is high, the graphics are terrible, the rules are worse, and many of the systems are overly complicated. However, when played, the game is a lot of fun. Of course, some of the burdensome rules must be streamlined, but that work is not excessive."

Clayton Miner reviewed Adventures in Fantasy for Pegasus magazine #1 (1981). He completed his review by saying: "Admittedly, this game does have its fascinations, especially to those who are interested in running a game with the flavor of medieval tales, rather than as Middle Earth. This is a game that should be avoided by those people who derive enjoyment from running a wide variety of character classes, as the only ones available are Warrior and Magic User. It is unfortunate that what could have been a superior project has turned out to be a disappointment in terms of playability and quality."
