= 1830: The Game of Railroads and Robber Barons =

Board game

- First edition box cover art
- Players: 2–6
- Setup time: 10 minutes
- Playing time: 4–6 hours
- Chance: None
- Age range: 12+
- Skills: Strategy

1830: The Game of Railroads and Robber Barons is a railroad operations and share trading board game first published by Avalon Hill in 1986 based on an original design by Francis Tresham. The popularity of 1830 spawned an industry creating similar "18XX" games. It was the inspiration for Sid Meier's Railroad Tycoon. 1830 was republished in 2011 through a partnership of Mayfair Games and Lookout Games.

== Game Structure ==
1830 is a strategy game where the only element of luck involved is in determining the initial play order. The game takes the basic mechanics from Francis Tresham’s 1829, with players seeking to make the most money by buying and selling stock in various rail transport companies located on a stylised eastern United States map. Players also operate any companies of which they are the President (by virtue of being the dominant shareholder), in order to generate revenue and affect stock prices.

The game is designed to represent the beginning of railroad operations in the eastern United States beginning in the year 1830, with stock companies in the game representing historical railroad companies.

The goal of the game is to maximise personal wealth before the game ends, whether by nurturing a railroad company to increase its stock value, gutting it and running with the money, successful stock trading or arranging for another player to go bankrupt. Buying, trading and speculating on the stock market is often where 1830 is won or lost.

A game is finished when the bank runs out of money or any player goes bankrupt, with the player with the greatest personal wealth winning.

=== Private Companies ===
- Schuylkill Valley Navigation Co.
- Champlain & St. Lawrence Railroad
- Delaware & Hudson Railroad
- Mohawk & Hudson Railroad
- Camden & Amboy Railroad
- Baltimore & Ohio Railroad

=== Stock Companies ===
- Baltimore and Ohio Railroad
- Boston and Maine Railroad
- Canadian Pacific Railway
- Chesapeake and Ohio Railway
- Erie Railroad
- New York Central Railroad
- New York, New Haven and Hartford Railroad
- Pennsylvania Railroad

== Computer Game ==
1830 has been translated as the PC game 1830: Railroads & Robber Barons by Simtex in 1995. This game has been praised for superior computer AI and, due to the lack of randomness in 1830 game play, the transparency of game play.

== Reception ==
Grant Tavinor, writing in The Aesthetics of Videogames, described the game as "extremely complicated".

=== Reviews ===
1830 was also reviewed in the 36th issue of Casus Belli.
