= The Yeti Sanction =

Role-playing game adventure

The Yeti Sanction is a 1984 role-playing game adventure for Lords of Creation published by The Avalon Hill Game Company.

== Contents ==
The Yeti Sanction is an adventure in which an espionage unit is sent to rescue government officials that have been kidnapped by the YETI terrorist organization.

== Publication history ==
The Yeti Sanction is the second official adventure for Lords of Creation, and is part of a series of adventures.

== Synopsis ==
The players are made an impromptu task force by the CIA, to investigate the disappearance of the American Secretary of State. The trail eventually leads them to a sanctuary in Nepal.

== Reception ==
Mike Dean reviewed The Yeti Sanction for Imagine magazine, and stated that "the approach to the plot is linear, allowing little freedom of choice for the players, but at least this means none of material is wasted, - and players are unlikely to notice. All in all, YS is a well presented, enjoyable and eminently playable scenario. Its only failing is its somewhat high price!"

William Wilson Goodson Jr. reviewed The Yeti Sanction in Space Gamer No. 76. Goodson commented that "The new systems given here for auto chases and crossing the dangerous mountain terrain are fairly simple and work well as part of the larger game."
