= Railroad Tycoon 3 =

2003 video game

- Developers: PopTop Software; Beenox (Mac)
- Publisher: Gathering
- Producer: Chris Lacey
- Designer: Phil Steinmeyer
- Programmer: Phil Steinmeyer
- Artist: Franz Felsl
- Composer: Jim Callahan
- Series: Railroad Tycoon
- Platforms: Windows, Mac OS X
- Release: Windows: NA: October 27, 2003; EU: October 31, 2003; Mac OS X November 22, 2004
- Genre: Business simulation
- Modes: Single-player, multiplayer

Railroad Tycoon 3 is a video game, part of the Railroad Tycoon series, that was released in 2003.

== Gameplay ==
Train at a service tower

With nearly 60 locomotives in the game (nearly 70 in the Coast to Coast expansion), the game has the most locomotives of the Railroad Tycoon franchise with locomotives from the United States, Britain, France, Germany, Italy, Japan, South Africa, Poland, Russia and more even fictional locomotives like the E-88 and the TransEuro, the latter of which is a fictional name for the Eurostar.

=== New features ===
The game interface is in full 3D, with free camera movement. The square grid is no longer rigid, as it was in Railroad Tycoon and Railroad Tycoon II - rail and structures can now be rotated 360 degrees.

The economic model has been reworked. In previous games, goods could only be picked up at a station, and revenue depended on the distance between stations. Carloads in Railroad Tycoon 3 slowly move across the map (representing road and water transport) along the gradient of a scalar field representing price, where supply and demand sites function as sources and sinks. Revenue depends on the price difference between pick-up and delivery. This has several effects; raw materials can find their way to industries and get processed, without any trains involved, and a train does not need to pick up goods at the source.

Other changes include: each carload of mail, passengers and troops now has a destination; car setup can be automated, so that trains always pick up the cars that yield the most revenue; warehouse buildings also appear in the game, completing the commodity market the same way as ports do; trains can pass each other on a single track (as in the original Railroad Tycoon on the lowest difficulty level); no need for signal towers, as well as station improvements (post offices, restaurants etc.), are placed individually on the map; players can buy industries, and also build processing industries wherever they like; processing industries have limited capacity, but they can be upgraded.

=== Campaign ===
The campaign of the game features sixteen scenarios across a total of five continents with seven maps in North America, six maps in Europe, and one map each in Asia, Africa, and South America.

USA Campaign: 1840–1941. Five scenarios.
Europe Campaign: 1840–1914. Five scenarios.
World Campaign: 1880–1985. Three scenarios.
Future Campaign: 2025–2080. Three scenarios.

The player is given the key to an anonymous city after passing all scenarios on bronze or higher.

== Development ==
By May 2003, the game had been in development for one and a half years, after another one and a half years were spent on its game engine. In 2002, Phil Steinmeyer had expressed his dislike of 3D graphics in strategy games, and felt that his company's next project after Tropico "would probably look better in straight pre-rendered 2D". To manage the popping inherent to level of detail systems in 3D graphics, the team created as many as six variants for the game's vehicles, buildings and other objects. Steinmeyer gave the example of a building that went as high as 931 or as low as 55 polygons, based on the closeness of the camera. According to Steinmeyer, the Railroad Tycoon 3 team comprised 13 people and development lasted roughly two and a half years.

A port for Mac was published and developed by MacSoft, and released in 2004.

== Reception ==
Reception

Aggregate score
Aggregator	Score
Metacritic	80/100

Review scores
Publication	Score
Computer Gaming World	4.5/5
GameSpot	8.7 out of 10
GameSpy	4/5
IGN	8.8 out of 10
PC Gamer (US)	88%
PC Zone	68/100
X-Play	4/5
PC Format	71%
Computer Games Magazine	2/5

Railroad Tycoon 3 received "generally favorable" reviews, according to the review aggregation website Metacritic.

Johnny L. Wilson of Computer Gaming World praised Railroad Tycoon 3's visuals, as well as the detail of its "marvelous" economics simulation. He considered the sequel "more than a face-lift" that simultaneously possessed "all the features that made its predecessors great". However, Wilson criticized its use of certain train models in countries where they had historically been absent. Writing for X-Play, John Duggan called Railroad Tycoon 3 "a serious time suck and highly addictive." While he criticized its changes to the ledger interface from Railroad Tycoon II, he noted the sequel's "more sophisticated economic model", and summarized it as a "rewarding" experience.

GameSpy named Railroad Tycoon 3 the tenth-best computer game of 2003, and the year's best "PC Empire Builder" game. The editors of Computer Gaming World nominated it for their 2003 "Strategy Game of the Year" award, which ultimately went to Age of Wonders: Shadow Magic. They wrote that "PopTop Software has done an amazing job updating this venerable series", but found Railroad Tycoon 3 too lacking in innovation to win the award. The game was also a finalist for IGN's "Best Economic Simulation Game" and GameSpot's "Best PC Game" and "Best Strategy Game" awards, but lost to SimCity 4 and Rise of Nations in these categories.

== Add-ons ==
Loco Commotion is a train-based puzzle game included on the play disc as a 141 MB optional extra. Loco Commotion involves solving routes and shunting puzzles by moving trains at precise times over increasingly difficult environments throughout the multiple levels.

The freeware expansion pack Coast to Coast contains some new locomotives, maps and scenarios. Among the scenarios are Imperial Russia and the People's Republic of China. There are unusual scenarios as well; including one in which the United States never underwent the Revolution, instead divided into seven separate nations. With the release of the Coast to Coast expansion pack, in addition to creating maps and scenarios, players were provided with tools to create custom logos, locomotive skins, and players.
