= PopTop Software =

American video game developer

PopTop Software Inc.
- Type: Subsidiary
- Industry: Video games
- Founded: 1993; 33 years ago
- Founder: Phil Steinmeyer
- Defunct: March 2006; 20 years ago
- Fate: Merged into Firaxis Games
- Headquarters: Fenton, Missouri, US
- Products: Railroad Tycoon II; Railroad Tycoon 3; Tropico
- Parent: Take-Two Interactive (2000–2005); 2K Games (2005–2006)

PopTop Software Inc. was an American video game developer based in Fenton, Missouri. Phil Steinmeyer started the company in 1993, creating Iron Cross and co-developing two Heroes of Might and Magic games with New World Computing. In 1998, the studio co-founded the publisher Gathering of Developers, which released its Railroad Tycoon II, Tropico, and Railroad Tycoon 3. PopTop Software and Gathering of Developers were bought by Take-Two Interactive in 2000, and the studio was organized under 2K Games in 2005. In 2006, it was merged into Firaxis Games, another 2K Games studio.

== History ==
In 1993, Phil Steinmeyer was a programmer of business software, something he considered boring, when he began working in the video game industry. He made Iron Cross mostly by himself and finished it with New World Computing. The game was released in 1994 as one of the first real-time strategy games. Steinmeyer continued working with New World Computing, co-developing Heroes of Might and Magic: A Strategic Quest (1995) and Heroes of Might and Magic II (1996). In 1996, he adopted the name PopTop Software for his company and began hiring artists and designers for a fully independent project. Wishing to work on a sequel to Railroad Tycoon, he called MicroProse and, to his surprise, quickly came to an agreement. At the same time, The 3DO Company bought New World Computing and ended its third-party publishing business, leaving PopTop Software without a publisher. In January 1998, PopTop Software was one of the founding members of Gathering of Developers, a developer-centric publisher run by six studios. Railroad Tycoon II, the first release for Gathering of Developers, was released in November 1998, followed the expansion pack The Second Century in April 1999.

The video game publisher Take-Two Interactive acquired Gathering of Developers in May 2000. On July 24, it announced the acquisition of PopTop Software. The deal saw a transaction of 559,100 shares in Take-Two Interactive, valued at an estimated US$5.8 million. Steinmayer remained as the studio president. The studio continued working with Gathering of Developers on Tropico and Railroad Tycoon 3. Steinmeyer left the studio in late 2004, founded New Crayon Games in May 2005, and developed Bonnie's Bookstore. On January 25, 2005, Take-Two Interactive announced the opening of the publishing label 2K Games, which would henceforth manage most of its studios, including PopTop Software. It released PopTop Software's Shattered Union in 2005. On March 8, 2006, Take-Two Interactive announced that PopTop Software had been merged into Firaxis Games, another 2K Games studio.

== Games developed ==
| Year | Title | Platform(s) | Publisher(s) | Notes | Ref. |
|---|---|---|---|---|---|
| 1994 | Iron Cross | MS-DOS | New World Computing | Co-developed with New World Computing | |
| 1995 | Heroes of Might and Magic: A Strategic Quest | MS-DOS, Windows | New World Computing | Co-developed with New World Computing | |
| 1996 | Heroes of Might and Magic II | MS-DOS, Windows | New World Computing | Co-developed with New World Computing | |
| 1998 | Railroad Tycoon II | Windows | Gathering of Developers | | |
| 1999 | Railroad Tycoon II: The Second Century | Windows | Gathering of Developers | Expansion pack | |
| 2001 | Tropico | Windows | Gathering of Developers | | |
| 2002 | Age of Wonders II: The Wizard's Throne | Windows | Gathering of Developers | Consultancy for Triumph Studios | |
| 2003 | Railroad Tycoon 3 | Windows | Gathering of Developers | | |
| 2005 | Shattered Union | Windows, Xbox | 2K Games | | |
