= Railroad Tycoon =

Video game series

- Genre: Business simulation
- Developers: MPS Labs; PopTop Software; Firaxis Games
- Publishers: Microprose; Gathering of Developers; 2K Games
- Creator: Sid Meier
- Platforms: MS-DOS, Amiga, Mac OS, Atari ST, FM Towns, NEC PC-9801, Windows, Linux, PlayStation, Dreamcast, Mac OS X
- First release: Railroad Tycoon; 1990
- Latest release: Sid Meier's Railroads; 2006

Railroad Tycoon is a business simulation game series. There are five games in the series; the original Railroad Tycoon (1990), Railroad Tycoon Deluxe (1993), Railroad Tycoon II (1998), Railroad Tycoon 3 (2003), and Railroads! (2006). Railroad Tycoon was written by game designer Sid Meier and published by MicroProse. Though it shares the "Tycoon" suffix, it is not related to other Microprose games such as RollerCoaster Tycoon and Transport Tycoon, which were developed by Scottish programmer Chris Sawyer.

The objective of the game is to build and manage a railroad company by laying track, building stations, and buying and scheduling trains. The railroad must be built in a certain time to win the game.

== Video games ==
Release timeline Main series in bold
1990	**Sid Meier's Railroad Tycoon**
1991
1992
1993	Sid Meier's Railroad Tycoon Deluxe
1994
1995
1996
1997
1998	**Railroad Tycoon II**
1999
2000
2001
2002
2003	**Railroad Tycoon 3**
2004
2005
2006	**Sid Meier's Railroads!**

=== Sid Meier's Railroad Tycoon ===
The original version allowed the player to start companies in several settings: the U.S. West and Midwest or the Northeast, England, and (on a smaller scale including southern England) Europe.

The player manages the business as described above and may also handle individual train movement and build additional industries. The game also has other railroad companies attempting to put the player out of business with stock dealings and "Rate Wars".

The player starts with one million dollars, half as equity, half as loan. The player can get more cash by selling $500,000 bonds at various interest rates (which depend on the current economic condition in the game).

As part of the release of the new Sid Meier's Railroads, 2K Games released the full version of the original Railroad Tycoon game for free, which is available on their website.

==== Sid Meier's Railroad Tycoon Deluxe ====
An updated version of this game named Railroad Tycoon Deluxe was created and released in 1993. Despite a host of new features and graphics, Deluxe sold very poorly, due to some bugs and slow gameplay (most notoriously the F4 map screen, which brings the game to a crawl).

Deluxe is essentially the same game as Railroad Tycoon, with improved hi-resolution graphics, new sound effects, and several additions. The additions are: new maps (South America and Africa) with region-specific cargo types (e.g. troops for Africa), new time ranges and locomotives, bandits who can hijack trains, and sheriffs who will arrest them.

Although the game is called Sid Meier's Railroad Tycoon Deluxe, Sid Meier himself had nothing to do with the development of this version.

=== Railroad Tycoon II ===
A sequel featuring improved graphics and more complex gameplay was published by Gathering of Developers in 1998 after PopTop Software acquired rights to the name from MicroProse, Sid Meier's original company which he himself left a year earlier to form Firaxis.

Some features of the first version are missing in this sequel, such as the ability to build tunnels and signal towers, but many new possibilities were added, such as the ability to have unlimited money, trains, and train routes, much better control of routes, dozens of new maps, and the ability to create and modify scenarios and maps.

The Dreamcast version was in full 3D.

There are dozens of new scenarios to play including ones in Africa, North America, Germany, the Swiss Alps, the jungles of South America, and even several places around the world in a possible future where Earth's oceans have risen. Most of the ones in Railroad Tycoon 1 are in Railroad Tycoon II. There are also many more first and second century campaigns to choose from than in Railroad Tycoon.

An expansion pack Railroad Tycoon II: Second Century was later added which contained new scenarios focusing on modern and near-future times, plus added new elements to the economy. The game and its expansion were repackaged together in the Gold Edition and then, with 50 additional user-made scenarios, into the Platinum Edition.

A short lived, budget title The Next Millennium went on sale in 2000. It featured many scenarios and features of The Second Century, but no map editor. It had no instruction booklet and was sold only in a jewel case.

=== Railroad Tycoon 3 ===
The second sequel, Railroad Tycoon 3, was released in 2003. It featured a full 3D environment, overpasses and tunnels, and much improved graphics. Gameplay changed significantly, with dynamic pricing of goods across the entire map and cargo that can find alternate means of transportation if no train service is provided; track was no longer laid on discrete square tiles, but as curved track on a 3D map. A map editor is included but cannot be used during the game.

An expansion pack, Coast to Coast, was released for download in 2004 with new scenarios, including a map of the entire United States and eight new locomotives.

=== Sid Meier's Railroads! ===
Sid Meier's Railroads! was released in October 2006. It was the first game in the Railroad Tycoon series since the original to have direct input from Sid Meier himself. Railroads! features a variety of scenarios and trains from both North America and Europe and is less industry-focused than previous versions. It has a simpler user interface for track laying, full 3D graphics, and real time gameplay.

== Board game ==
Railroad Tycoon is a railway-themed board game designed by Martin Wallace and Glenn Drover. The game, published in 2005 by Eagle Games, is derived from Wallace's earlier railway-themed game Age of Steam with more stylistic box art and simplified rules. Originally using the Railroad Tycoon license and featuring box art very similar to the third entry in the series, it has been published under the title Railways of the World since 2009. Railroad Tycoon takes place in the eastern United States in 1830. Each player takes charge of a pioneering new railway company.
