= Star Probe =

- Star Probe (1975)
- Designers: John M. Snider
- Publishers: TSR, Inc.
- Publication: 1975; 50 years ago
- Players: 1–8
- Playing time: 360 minutes
- Age range: 10 +

Star Probe is a science fiction game written by John Snider and published in 1975 by TSR, Inc. with artwork by Paul Snider. It was to be the first of a series of interconnected space games, followed Star Empires. The game consists of a 36-page rulebook with a map and counters that players use in their quest for interstellar exploration.

== Gameplay ==
The object of the game is to discover new worlds with potential for colonization. Each player has a ship which they must equip with personnel, weapons, fuel, and rations, funded by an initial grant and later by cash gained through exploration. These are lost or consumed during the course of play. The star systems on the map have numbers indicating how far above or below the plane of the map they are; hence the ships are free to move in three dimensions.

The generic type (amoeboid, insect, feline, avian, etc.) of inhabitants on a planet can be determined by a roll of percentile dice—a similar system appears in Traveller. Players can battle with hostile inhabitants as well as spaceship battles with other players, but doing so costs the players' cash and materials. Star Probe is divided into 60 game turns, with each turn corresponding to one month in the game, although this time limit can be adjusted for the number of players. The winner of the game is the player who has gained the most cash and materials through exploration in this time limit.

== Publication history ==
According to Shannon Appelcline, "Star Probe (1975) by John M. Snider was scheduled for 1974 but slipped into 1975. It was a science-fiction board game of the sort that was just emerging as its own new field — as could be seen in Metagaming's The Space Gamer (1975–1980). Star Probe was supposed to be the first game in a trilogy, but by the time TSR released the second game, Star Empires (1977), they'd already found their niche, and it wasn't in science-fiction board gaming after all. They eventually returned the rights to the games to Snider in 1980."

== Reception ==
Edward C. Cooper reviewed Star Probe in The Space Gamer No. 3, commenting that "Star Probe has something for everyone".

In a retrospective review in the February 2000 of InQuest Gamer, Tom Slizewski states that the game's rulebook "reads like a 36-page math equation" and had a negative opinion of the game.
