= Star Empires =

1977 board wargame

- Designers: John M. Snider
- Publishers: TSR
- Publication: 1977; 48 years ago
- Genres: science fiction board wargame

Star Empires is a 1977 board wargame published by TSR.

== Gameplay ==
Star Empires is a sequel to Star Probe, and is a game in which the players control a civilization that has just discovered interstellar exploration and must explore a vast star cluster.

== Publication history ==
According to Shannon Appelcline, "Star Probe (1975) by John M. Snider was scheduled for 1974 but slipped into 1975. It was a science-fiction board game of the sort that was just emerging as its own new field — as could be seen in Metagaming's The Space Gamer (1975–1980). Star Probe was supposed to be the first game in a trilogy, but by the time TSR released the second game, Star Empires (1977), they'd already found their niche, and it wasn't in science-fiction board gaming after all. They eventually returned the rights to the games to Snider in 1980."

== Reception ==
Norman S. Howe reviewed Star Empires in The Space Gamer No. 14. Howe commented that "It may be a coincidence, but this game emerges just when Star Wars is gaining popularity. This may account for my reaction to it. So go out and buy this game. Build an empire, use Nova Bombs and Planetbusters."

Martin Easterbrook reviewed Star Empires for White Dwarf #4, giving it an overall rating of 7 out of 10, and stated that "The basic philosophy of the rules is similar to that in Dungeons & Dragons in that they do not seek to limit your actions to a set of permissible rules but instead try to supply you with a means of representing the effect of any action that you might wish to make. That someone should have attempted this is not surprising; that it should be done so well is amazing!"
