= Powers & Perils =

1983 fantasy role-playing game

Cover art by James Talbot

Powers & Perils (P&P) is a fantasy role-playing game designed by Richard Snider and published by Avalon Hill in 1984. This complex game was Avalon Hill's first foray into the role-playing game market, and proved a commercial failure.

== Description ==
Powers & Perils is a fantasy role-playing game published as a boxed set that contained five rulebooks, a pad of character sheets, and dice.

The first 44-page booklet, "The Character Book", describes the long character generation process. Unlike Dungeons & Dragons, this game has no specific character classes.

The second 52-page booklet, "The Combat and Magic Book", covers the rules of combat and spellcasting, including how characters can become magicians.

The third 60-page booklet, "The Creature Book", describes the universe — divided into the Upper World, the Middle World and the Lower World — and the creatures and demons that inhabit each.

The fourth 52-page booklet, "The Book of Human Encounters and Treasure", contains information for the gamemaster, including the rules for generating human non-player characters, and tables for generating treasure.

The fifth 24-page booklet, "County Mordara", is an introductory adventure.

=== Gameplay ===
Character generation is very involved, with over 40 pages of rules and dozens of tables and charts to reference. The combat system is much simpler, and similar to other role-playing games of the period. Characters playing spellcasters must choose a Magic Path, each featuring its own laws and spells. Like character generation, the act of casting magic requires a complex set of rules.

== Publication history ==
Avalon Hill was the industry leader in board wargames in the 1960s and 1970s, so when the company announced a foray into the world of role-playing games, their new game generated anticipation. The company announced that their new fantasy role-playing game was being designed by Richard Snider, one of the original players in Dave Arneson's seminal Blackmoor campaign; Snider had also co-authored Adventures in Fantasy with Arneson. P&P was scheduled to be revealed at Origins 1983, but is wasn't ready in time, and the rooms in which the game was supposed to have been demonstrated were instead left empty. P&P was finally published some months after Origins.

Following the release of Powers & Perils, Avalon Hill published three supplements for it: a complete world campaign setting titled The Perilous Lands; an adventure scenario, Tower of the Dead; and a booklet titled Book of Tables that was a collection of all of the many charts and formulae required to play the game.

=== The Perilous Lands ===
The supplement Perilous Lands is a boxed set that presents an entire continent called "The Perilous Lands", divided into 26 regions. A 32-page booklet, "The Map Book", displays separate maps of each region. A 68-page booklet, "The Culture Book", describes the 71 different societies or cultures that inhabit the Perilous Lands, including economic and religious details for each as well as enemies and alliances. A 36-page booklet, "The Site Book", lists seventeen notable places in the Perilous Lands, and gives detailed descriptions of fifteen of the seventeen. (One of the missing places, Tower of the Dead, was released as a separate adventure. The other, Doom Manor, was published in the second issue of Avalon Hill's short-lived fantasy magazine Heroes.

=== Tower of the Dead ===
Tower of the Dead, the only adventure published for Powers & Perils, is a boxed set designed by Richard Snider, with artwork by Rick Barber, Winchell Chung, Michael Creager, and Bob Haynes that contains a 56-page adventure book and a cardstock gamemaster's screen. Through a four-part adventure, the player characters become aware that the lich Nilgeranthrib seeks to become ruler of Thaliba, and they must endeavor to destroy the creature.

== Failure ==
After the widespread interest in Avalon Hill's entry into the role-playing game market, Powers & Perils was received with disappointment by players and critics alike. Fantasy Gamer called it "the target of derision from many quarters within the gaming industry: Its rules are condemned as overly complicated and chart-heavy; its layout and graphics are generously described as uninspired." Reviewer Matthew J. Costello felt "Disappointment because P&P adds nothing to the genre of fantasy roleplaying games. No new and exciting worlds in which to game; no innovative or gameable systems." Game historian Shannon Appelcline called it "a grave disappointment" and ascribed its failure to Avalon Hill's inexperience in the role-playing game, market, "an inexperience that was highlighted by the fact that Powers & Perils included stolen art traced from fantasy artist Frank Frazetta."

Poor sales of Powers & Perils led its rapid discontinuation after only a year.

== Reception ==
In Issue 6 of Fantasy Gamer, Matthew J. Costello commented "The game systems remind me of a math text gone awry. Abbreviations — 58 unfamiliar groups of letters — stalk these pages like demons. Formulas of incredible complexity ... are the crux of nearly every skill and procedure ... This is a nightmare." Costello called the time he worked through the booklets "one of the most tedious game activities I've had to do ... the rules start to read like a Mad Math Professor trying desperately to communicate the dizzying complexity of his beloved subject."

In the September 1984 edition of White Dwarf (Issue #57), Adrian Knowles commented, "Overall, P&P introduces some nice ideas which can be adapted readily into other systems. The game is more suited to experienced players and GMs since it is fairly complex." Knowles concluded by giving the game a good rating of 8 out of 10, saying, "In general, a greater amount of work than is normal for an RPG is needed for playing Powers and Perils, but it is a good system."

In the October 1984 edition of Imagine (Issue 19), Mike Dean stated that "I have my doubts as to whether P&P will make it as a widely popular RPG, but I am sure it will gain a considerable and well-deserved following." Several issue later, Mike Dean noted the relatively high price of the adventure Tower of the Dead, but still recommended it, saying "Tower of the Dead is a formidable challenge to any experienced group of P&P players and is recommended in spite of what may seem to be a high price."

In the January–February 1985 edition of Different Worlds (Issue #38), Troy Christensen was unimpressed, saying that the game "is lost in the limbo somewhere between the complexity of Chivalry & Sorcery and the simplicity of Dungeons & Dragons." Christensen found issues with character generation, which he said: "takes about ten times longer than most fantasy games." In contrast, he found combat too simplistic, and commented that "With a combination of simplicity and complexity mixed so unequally and haphazardly, the game seems ungainly and plays roughly." Christensen concluded by giving the game a below-average rating of 1.5 stars out of 4, saying, "Powers & Perils to me adds nothing beyond what I have found in other more established games."

Rick Swan reviewed Powers & Perils twice:

- In his 1990 book The Complete Guide to Role-Playing Games, Swan called the game "a hodgepodge of unfocused ideas and absurdly complex systems that's nearly impossible to play." Swan noted that "Virtually every aspect of a player character, regardless of how trivial, requires the player to navigate complex formulas and an alphabet soup of head-scratching abbreviations." In contrast, Swan found the combat system "surprisingly straightforward", and the magic system "interesting." But he pointed out that "using magic involves even more formulas and tables, and it's hardly worth the effort." Swan concluded by giving this game a poor rating of only 1.5 out of 4, saying, "only the most determined players will be able to slog through it."
- In a retrospective review in the January 1996 edition of Dragon, Swan recalled that Powers & Perils had been the second-worst game he'd ever played, calling it an "incomprehensible role-playing game."
