= Avalon Hill =

Board game company

Avalon Hill Games Inc.
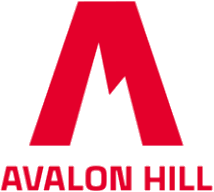
- Formerly: The Avalon Game Company (1981-1998)
- Type: Private (1981–98); Subsidiary (1998–present)
- Industry: Game
- Founded: 1952; 74 years ago in Baltimore, Maryland
- Founder: Charles S. Roberts
- Headquarters: Renton, Washington, United States
- Products: Board games
- Parent: Hasbro Interactive (1998–2001); Wizards of the Coast (2004–2020); Hasbro Gaming (2021–present)
- Website: avalonhill.com

Avalon Hill Games Inc. is a game company that publishes wargames and strategic board games. It has also published miniature wargaming rules, role-playing games and sports simulations. It is a subsidiary of Hasbro, and operates under the company's "Hasbro Gaming" division.

Avalon Hill introduced many of the concepts of modern recreational wargaming, including the use of a hexagonal grid (a.k.a. hexgrid) overlaid on a flat folding board, zones of control (ZOC), stacking of multiple units at a location, and board games based upon historical events.

== History ==
=== The Avalon Game Company ===
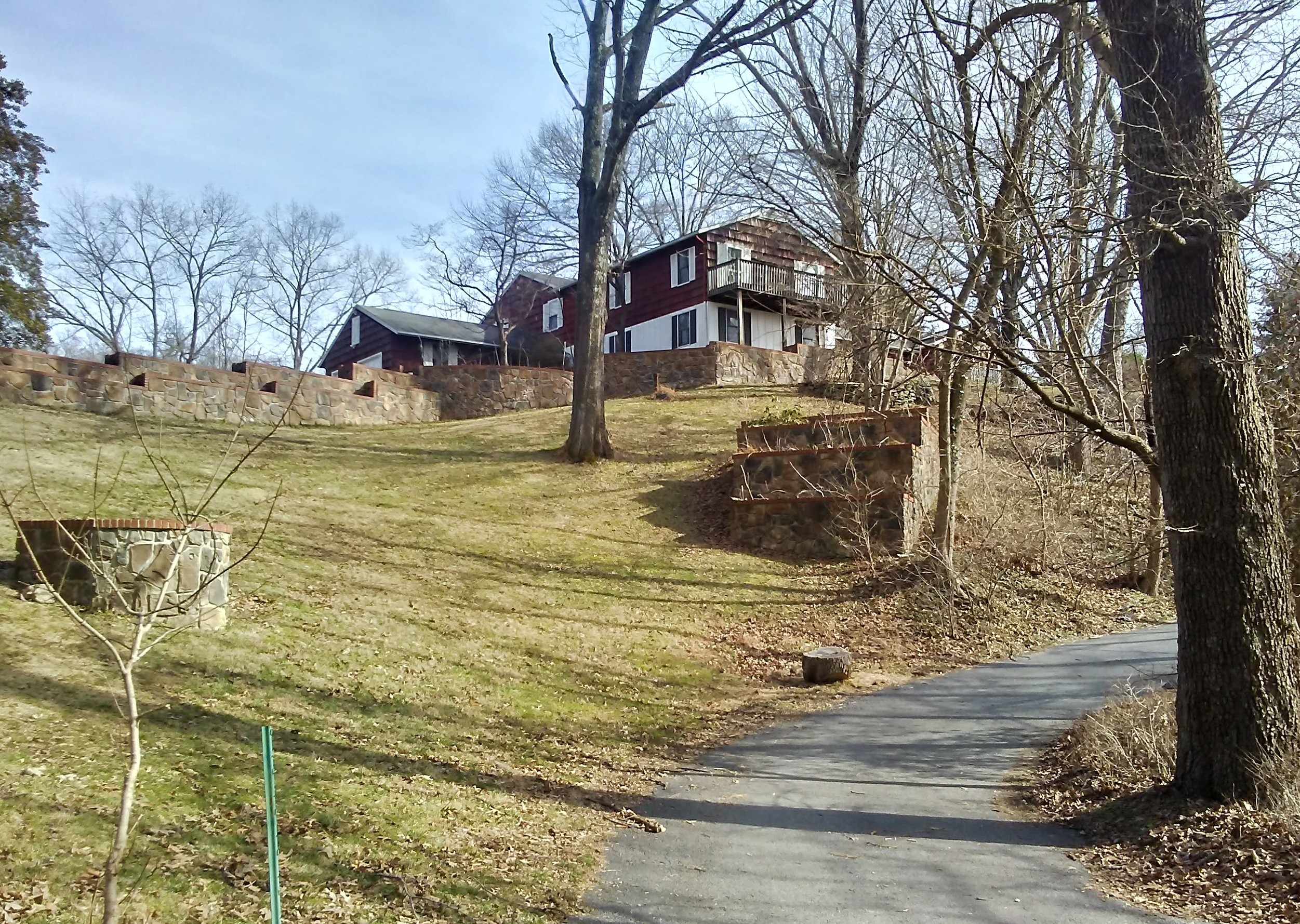
Home of Charles S. Roberts, founder of the company during the 1950s, located on a hill in the Avalon neighborhood of Catonsville, Maryland. The Avalon Game Company sold mailorder games from the garage for six years 1952–1958. Photo 2020.

Avalon Hill was started in 1952 outside Baltimore in Catonsville, Maryland, by Charles S. Roberts under the name of "The Avalon Game Company" for the publication of his game Tactics. It is considered the first of a new type of war game, consisting of a self-contained printed map, pieces, rules and box designed for the mass-market. Other war games published over the prior half-century, from which Roberts drew inspiration, were either not designed for the commercial market and/or used miniatures with self-made maps/terrain. Roberts sold Tactics by mail from his home in the Avalon neighborhood of Catonsville; his house overlooked the Patapsco River valley and B&O Railroad for which Roberts, his father and grandfather worked.

Following the success of Tactics, Roberts changed the name upon incorporation from "The Avalon Game Company" to "Avalon Hill" in 1958 because of a naming dispute with another company, and given the Avalon house was on a hill. The number of games released per year was erratic until 1964 as the company released anywhere from 1 to 7 games.^{5-8}

The first game published by the company under the name of "Avalon Hill" was Gettysburg, published in 1958, it was also the first board wargame to simulate a historical battle. AH published two other games that year, the second edition of Tactics, titled Tactics II, and the railroad game Dispatcher.

In 1959, Roberts moved Avalon into an office space on Gay Street in Baltimore and took on its first outside designed game, Verdict, by two corporate lawyers. After another office move, in August 1960 Thomas N. Shaw, a high school friend of Roberts, was hired to design games.^{6}

In 1960, Avalon published the first mostly dice-less sports game in Football Strategy designed by Thomas N. Shaw which was followed by two sister games, Baseball Strategy and Basketball Strategy. Of this sports strategy line, the football and baseball versions were previously privately published by Shaw in 1959.^{7} With a recession occurring, debt began to pile up starting in 1961.

Avalon launched a pre-school children's line in 1963 with four games, Imagination, What Time Is It?, Doll House and Trucks, Trains, Boats & Planes, which flopped. Roberts gave up and planned to file bankruptcy on December 13, 1963.^{p7} Instead his creditors, Monarch Office Services and J.E. Smith & Co., interceded and took over. Monarch had printed all but the boxes, which were done by J.E. Smith. The company was reorganized by retaining only one staff member, Shaw, moving, cutting costs and appointing J.E. Sparling as president.^{p7,8} In 1964, AH set a two-game per year release schedule.^{5-8}

Avalon Hill published Blitzkrieg in 1965. This game was an abstract combat game, featuring two sides (red and blue) and some neutral countries. Many rules variants were created for Blitzkrieg. The company also published simulations of actual battles and campaigns, such as Midway, Afrika Korps, and The Battle of the Bulge.

Avalon Hill published PanzerBlitz in 1970, designed for the company by Jim Dunnigan's Simulations Publications, Inc. (SPI) on a royalty basis from SPI's Tac Force 3 game.^{p9}

=== Monarch Avalon Division ===
Monarch bought out J.E. Smith & Co., Avalon Hill's co-owner, on November 30, 1971. Thus the company became a division of a renamed Monarch Office Services, Monarch Avalon.^{p10} Coinciding with the purchase, an additional warehouse was opened in historic downtown Baltimore at 1501 Guilford Ave., complementing the original building at 4517 Harford Road. Don Greenwood joined in 1972.

The company acquired several successful games including Acquire, TwixT, and Feudal from the purchase of 3M Games in February 1976.^{p5,12} The Sports Illustrated (SI) line of sports games were purchased in December 1976. Both lines increased the retail outlets that would take AH games. The Aladdin Industries game line was another acquisition in March 1977. With the SI line, the company started a sports game division in May 1977 with Bruce Milligan hired to head the division and launch All Star Replay sport games magazine. While from the 3M line, Facts in Five became its top selling game.^{p5,12}

During the 1970s, Avalon Hill published a number of popular games such as Outdoor Survival, Panzer Blitz, Squad Leader, the Statis Pro sports line, and Tobruk: Tank Battles in North Africa 1942.

Avalon Hill also purchased many games from smaller companies and republished them. Heritage Models sold AH its Battleline Publications in October 1979.^{p5,15} Many of the Battleline products, including Wooden Ships and Iron Men and Machiavelli (a variant of Diplomacy set in Renaissance Italy), was republished by Avalon Hill, along with the popular Diplomacy. AH also acquired Jedko Games' The Russian Campaign and War at Sea, and Hartland Trefoil's Civilization. The railroad building game 1830 was developed by Avalon Hill, based on Francis Tresham's European game 1829; the AH version was so successful it spawned an entire 18XX genre of games.

Gulf Strike was introduced by the company in 1983. It was based on the Iran–Iraq War, then updated after the cease-fire in 1988. Dr. Ruth's Game of Good Sex was released in 1985. A Baltimore distributor said: "I'm going to have to compare this to Trivial Pursuit. The orders overshadow anything we've had in our company's 100-year history." It then dropped off.

Facing an economic downturn in 1990 and a three-year period of losses, Monarch Avalon closed its New York office, sold its toy division, and reduced inventory. AH also published its timely game expansion, Desert Shield, that sold out in weeks after its October 1990 release such that a second print run hit the market in December 1990. In 1991, Hobbycraft Canada was sharing office space with Monarch Avalon.

The AvalonCon World Boardgaming Championships was first held by AH in 1991, in the Baltimore area.

=== Roleplaying games ===
In 1974, a new game developer attempted to pitch his concept to Avalon Hill. Gary Gygax and Dave Arneson had co-developed a new type of co-operative game that used role-playing. But when Gygax pitched Dungeons & Dragons to AH, the largest company in wargaming did not understand the concept of role-playing, and turned down his offer. Gygax responded by founding TSR Inc to self-publish his game. In less than five years, TSR would be the dominant player in the new RPG market.

Avalon Hill entered the role-playing game market a decade later by publishing Powers and Perils in 1983 and Lords of Creation in 1984. The licenses to RuneQuest and the board games White Bear & Red Moon (republished as Dragon Pass) and Elric, were acquired in a complex agreement in 1983 with Chaosium, and Avalon Hill published the 3rd Edition in 1984. None of these role-playing games achieved the popularity of the long-established competitor, Dungeons & Dragons.

=== Video games ===
Avalon Hill became an early publisher of computer games in 1980 with its video game division Microcomputer Games, adapting some of its boardgame titles to various computer platforms (TRS-80, Vic-20, Commodore 64, Apple II, etc.) on several data formats (cassette tape and 5¼" disk). Sales of these products were decent, but the only outstanding success was Achtung Spitfire!, published relatively late in the company history. The company briefly published games for the Atari 2600, including London Blitz in 1983. For this, they employed sixteen year old Rebecca Heineman to teach their staff to code.

In December 1992, AH hired Jim Rose to lead its computer game division, with the goal of reviving this part of the business in the face of flagging board game sales. AH reentered the computer game market in 1994 with a good review of "Flight Commander 2". The company added Pogs to its game line up in 1995. By June 1995, Rose had left the company to found TalonSoft. In 1995, Monarch Avalon placed Avalon Hill up for sale but it was later withdrawn. Avalon Hill's return to computer games proved unsuccessful: Terry Coleman of Computer Gaming World reported in late 1998 that "no AH game in the past five years [had] sold even 50,000 units worldwide".

=== Hasbro subsidiary ===
Monarch sold Avalon Hill to Hasbro on August 4, 1998, for $6 million. Coinciding with the purchase, Hasbro laid off AH's entire staff. Hasbro, seeking popular board games that could be converted to computer versions, purchased the rights to the Avalon Hill trademarks, copyrights, inventory, tooling and divisions, Avalon Hill Software and Victory Games, and placed them under its video game subsidiary, Hasbro Interactive. Avalon Hill Games, Inc. was incorporated by Hasbro on March 2, 1998.

In 2001, Hasbro Interactive was sold to Infogrames; Avalon Hill was not included in the sale and Hasbro later transferred control of the company to its subsidiary, Wizards of the Coast, in 2004.

Hasbro has released new titles under the Avalon Hill name, and added the Avalon Hill imprint to older titles such as Axis and Allies that were not originally made by Avalon Hill.

On September 8, 2020, Hasbro announced that it would move the management of Avalon Hill from Wizards of the Coast to Hasbro Gaming in January 2021.

== Game rights ==
The rights to many of Avalon Hill's more complex games have been licensed or sold to other game publishers, or have reverted to their original owners and been republished by other companies:

- Multi-Man Publishing acquired a license to Advanced Squad Leader and the Great Campaigns of the American Civil War series, and has since published new materials for these.
- Valley Games published new versions of Titan, Hannibal: Rome versus Carthage, and Republic of Rome.
- GMT Games published new editions of Avalon Hill's early card-driven wargames We the People (retitled Washington's War), Successors, and For the People, and a descendant of Advanced Third Reich/Empire of the Rising Sun named A World at War.
- Mayfair Games now has the rights to 1830 (one of several 18XX games they publish).

== Victory Games ==
One of Avalon Hill's competitors, Simulations Publications, Inc. (SPI), produced wargames that were more complex and realistic simulations than those that Avalon Hill published. In 1982, after SPI's assets were acquired by TSR, Avalon Hill hired away some of SPI's design staff and formed them into a subsidiary company, Victory Games. When Victory Games released a line of SPI-style games, it met with critical and commercial acclaim. In 1989, Victory Games brought on Leonard Quam, a veteran from West End Games, and hired Kevin Boylan as a product developer. Victory Games continued to develop and release new products, including 3rd Fleet, 5th Fleet, Sixth Fleet, and Carrier. The New York office closed in early 1991 after Quam left the company. Victory's final two games, Flashpoint Golan and Across Five Aprils, were developed by Boylan alone, who worked remotely in collaboration with Avalon Hill's art department.

In addition from 1983 to 1987, the imprint also published an officially licensed tabletop role-playing game of the James Bond spy fiction media franchise, James Bond 007: Role-Playing In Her Majesty's Secret Service.

== Magazines ==
=== The General ===
Heroes Magazine advertising flyer included in the 1984 RuneQuest Player's Box

Avalon Hill also had its own house organ which promoted sale and play of its games, The General Magazine, which was published regularly between 1964 and 1998. The magazine offered a wide array of features, including articles on both strategies of play and tactics for specific situations, historical analyses, semi-regular features devoted to individual games, columns on sports and computer games by AH, listings of vendors and opponents, answers to questions on game rules, ratings for both games and players, discount coupons for mail orders, and insider information on future AH projects.

=== All-Star Replay ===
This magazine was for Avalon Hill's sports games. A total of 19 issues were published quarterly (later bi-monthly) from 1977 to 1981.

=== Heroes ===
In early 1984, on the occasion of the release of third edition RuneQuest, Avalon Hill included in all RuneQuest boxes a single advertising flyer announcing the launch of HEROES, its own role-playing magazine. HEROES ran for ten issues from 1984 to 1986 and had the main purpose to promote all four of Avalon Hill's role-playing games: James Bond 007, Lords of Creation, Powers and Perils, and RuneQuest.

== See also ==
- List of Avalon Hill games
