= Sam Grant (game) =

American Civil War block wargame

- Cover art by Eric Hotz
- Designers: Tom Dalgliesh; Gary Selkirk
- Illustrators: Eric Hotz
- Publishers: Columbia Games
- Publication: 1997
- Genres: American Civil War

Sam Grant, subtitled "The Civil War in the West 1862-1864", is a block wargame published by Columbia Games in 1997 that simulates the Western campaign led by Ulysses S. Grant during the American Civil War.

== Description ==
Sam Grant is a wargame for 2 players in which one player controls Confederate forces while the other player controls Union forces.

=== Components ===
The main map is a 22" x 25" cardboard hex grid mapsheet used for operational movement covering what was then the western territory of America along the Mississippi and Tennessee Rivers from Cincinnati to Vicksburg. To accommodate the relatively large blocks, the map uses hexes that are 1.25 inches (3.2 cm) across, twice as large as the standard 5/8" (1.5 cm) hexes used in other wargames of the time. A smaller 6"x10" "battleboard" is used for face-to-face battles.

Rather than using the cardboard counters normally associated with board wargames, Sam Grant uses plastic blocks to which stickers have been affixed that indicate each military unit and its strength. The blocks stand on their side with the unit information facing away from the opposing player. Thus the opponent does not know what the unit or its strength is until it is engaged in combat.

=== Scenarios ===
There are three shorter scenarios that each correspond to a year of the war from 1862 to 1864. There is also a longer campaign game that combines all of the shorter scenarios. In all scenarios, each turn represents one month of the war.

=== Movement ===
Any unit within range of its Headquarters (HQ) block can move, but each unit that does this reduces the HQ's value by 1. When the value of the HQ block reaches zero, it becomes ineffective; the player has to rebuild it to restore its function.

Movement is classified as either

- Movement without fighting: Each unit can cross the map to the limits of its movement allowance.
- Moving into a fight: The number of units that can move into the battle hex is limited by the type of terrain.

=== Combat ===
Both players move the blocks that are involved in the battle to the battlemap. It is here that the blocks are laid down, and each player an see what they are actually fighting.

=== Victory conditions ===
Each player has a Victory Point (VP) Track, and uses a marker to track their VPs. Each side gains VPs for occupying key cities. For every two months of the dry season, the Confederate player gains a VP.

A player wins the game if the marker on their VP track reaches "Decisive Victory" at the end of any month.

== Combining with Bobby Lee ==
Columbia Games had previously published Bobby Lee, which covers the eastern campaigns of the American Civil War. After the release of Sam Grant, Columbia published rules to combine both games, with the ability to transfer military units from one theater to the other via rail.

== Publication history ==
In 1972, after Scottish immigrant Tom Dalgliesh graduated from Simon Fraser University in Vancouver, Canada, he and two friends he had met in the university chess club, Lance Gutteridge and Steve Brewster, started up Gamma Two Games and published the block wargame Quebec 1759. The company (renamed Columbia Games in 1983) subsequently published many more block wargames, including the American Civil War game Bobby Lee (1993) that covered the campaigns of Robert E. Lee in the eastern theater.

In 1997, Columbia published a companion block wargame, Sam Grant, that covered the war in the western theater. It was designed by Dalgliesh and Gary Selkirk, with artwork and cartography by Eric Hotz. The company later published rules for how to combine the two games into one large campaign.

== Reception ==
Writing for The General, John Kisner complimented the artwork and cartography of Eric Hotz. Kisner did point out the ahistoric strategic difficulties for the Union player in the 1862 scenario, noting, "The Confederate line along the Cumberland is strong because the between-hex terrain along it disfavors the Union's ability to reinforce an attack. But the line will break; it's only a matter of time. It does gets a little frustrating, but the mental challenge, for both sides, holds interest throughout the chess-like maneuvering." Kisner concluded, "Sam Grant has a lot more going for it than clever terrain effects [such as] a second scenario that presents the Union with another neat puzzle: how to take Vicksburg. About the only part of the game that isn't a puzzle is the rules, which are a joy to read."

In Issue 108 of the French games magazine Casus Belli, Frédéric Bey noted, "Beneath the apparent simplicity of these plastic blocks lies a precise game system that allows for a nuanced simulation of military events and their context." Bey found the blocks added much to the game, commenting, "The cubes prove to be extremely effective: they make it easy to track loss increments (with each face representing a level) and to keep the deployment of forces secret." Bey concluded that the blocks added "A touch of tactics in this strategy game!"
