= Castles of Orbaal =

1992 fantasy role-playing game supplement

- Cover art by Eric Hotz
- Designers: Tom Dalgliesh
- Illustrators: Eric Hotz
- Publishers: Columbia Games
- Publication: 1992
- Genres: Low fantasy

Castles of Orbaal, subtitled "Arathel, Marby, Pled, Sherwyn", is a supplement published by Columbia Games in 1992 for the fantasy tabletop role-playing setting Hârn that describes four castles in one of the regions of the game.

== Contents ==
Orbaal is a northern region of Hârn where viking clans from Ivinia have taken control. Castles of Orbaal describes four castles in the region, providing information about the current castle owners and notable non-player characters, as well as complete floor plans of the castles and maps of the lands surrounding each castle. Much of the information about the province of Orbaal was reprinted from the supplement Orbaal (1984).

== Publication history ==
In 1983, Columbia Games launched the role-playing setting Hârn, designed by N. Robin Crossby. Columbia Games immediately began to produce supplements to provide details about the various lands, regions, peoples, flora and fauna of the world, including Orbaal (1984), a supplement describing a northern region of the world. Nine years later, Columbia recycled some of that material in Castles of Orbaal, a book designed by Tom Dalgliesh and Edwin King with cover art by Eric Hotz.

== Reception ==
In Issue 40 of White Wolf (1994), Ken Rolston reviewed both Castles of Hârn and Castles of Orbaal and stated "If you run any sort of historically based low fantasy campaign - Pendragon or Ars Magica campaigns in particular - Castles of Hârn and Castles of Orbaal are just right. Other more shamelessly heroic settings (like AD&D Greyhawk or Warhammer Fantasy Role Play) may require importing loads of alien races and spell casters, but the castle plans, terrain maps and NPC thumbnails work just fine regardless."

In Issue 76 of the French games magazine Casus Belli, Mathias Twardowski was not impressed that much of the information about the province of Orbaal had already been published in the supplement Orbaal, commenting, "this supplement leaves a rather unpleasant aftertaste of sloppy completion. The castles are superbly described and detailed, especially the very original Sherwyn, but a large portion of the booklet is taken up with a new version of the description of the kingdom of Orbaal (already presented in Orbaal). This version, while better done, in no way deserved to be included in this supplement and seems to be there only to pad out this long-announced supplement."
