= Bobby Lee (game) =

American Civil War block wargame

- Cover art by Eric Hotz
- Designers: Tom Dalgliesh
- Illustrators: Eric Hotz
- Publishers: Columbia Games
- Publication: 1993
- Genres: American Civil War

Bobby Lee, subtitled "The Civil War in Virginia 1861-1865", is a block wargame published by Columbia Games in 1993 that simulates the campaigns of the Army of Virginia under Robert E. Lee during the American Civil War.

== Description ==
Bobby Lee is a wargame for 2 players in which one player controls Confederate forces while the other player controls Union forces.

=== Components ===
The main map is a 22" x 25" cardboard hex grid mapsheet used for operational movement that covers the territory from Harrisburg in the north to Norfolk, Virginia in the south, and from the Shenandoah Valley in the west to the Atlantic Ocean. A smaller 6"x10" "battleboard" is used for face-to-face battles. Rather than using the cardboard counters normally associated with board wargames, Bobby Lee uses 84 wooden blocks to which stickers have been affixed that indicate each military unit and its strength. The blocks stand on their side with the unit information facing away from the opposing player. Thus the opponent does not know what the unit or its strength is until it is engaged in combat.

=== Scenarios ===
There are four shorter scenarios that each correspond to a year of the war from 1861 to 1864. There is also a longer campaign game that combines all of the shorter scenarios. In all scenarios, each turn represents one month of the war.

=== Movement ===
Any unit within range of its Headquarters (HQ) block can move, but each unit that does this reduces the HQ's value by 1. When the HQ becomes ineffective, the player has to rebuild it to restore its function.

Movement is classified as either

- Movement without fighting: Each unit can cross the map to the limits of its movement allowance.
- Moving into a fight: The number of units that can move into the battle hex is limited by the type of terrain.

=== Combat ===
Both players move the blocks that are involved in the battle to the battlemap. It is here that the blocks are laid down, and each player an see what they are actually fighting.

=== Victory conditions ===
Each player has a Victory Point (VP) Track, and uses a marker to track their VPs. Each side gains VPs for occupying key cities. For every two months of the dry season, the Confederate player gains a VP. The Union player gains three VPs for issuing the Emancipation Proclamation, but cannot do so until the Union army has won a major victory.

A player wins the game if the marker on their VP track reaches "Decisive Victory" at the end of any month.

== Publication history ==
In 1972, after Scottish immigrant Tom Dalgliesh graduated from Simon Fraser University in Vancouver, Canada, he and two friends he had met in the university chess club, Lance Gutteridge and Steve Brewster, started up Gamma Two Games and published the block wargame Quebec 1759. The company (renamed Columbia Games in 1983) subsequently published many more block wargames, including Napoleon (1974), EastFront (1991), and Bobby Lee (1993). The latter was designed by Dalgliesh, with art by Eric Hotz.

In 1997, Columbia published a companion block wargame, Sam Grant, that covers the western theater of the American Civil War. The company later published rules for how to combine the two games into one large campaign.

== Reception ==
In Issue 11 of Berg's Review of Games, game designer Mark Herman liked the production values, noting, "Visually the game is very pretty with good graphics and all of those fun wooden blocks. The rules are well written with a few exceptions." Herman particularly liked the "fog of war" effect that the blocks introduced to the game, stating, "Fog of War, of course, is the system's great strength, and it is 'gamed' far better than anything else out there. You just don't know what is going on. " But Herman found issues with the combat system, pointing out, "Whatever rules problems exist are within the Battle rules ... If I have a particular problem with the game, it's that, at [the tactical] level, the game is far too homogeneous." Herman concluded by summarizing the graphics as "beautiful" and the game as "A good time, with a touch of historicity thrown in."

In Issue 87 of the British wargaming magazine Perfidious Albion, Charles Vasey questioned the ratio of Union to Confederate forces in the 1864 scenario, noting that the Union has a 31% advantage, which he felt was too low for the final year of the war. Vasey pointed out in the rival game Lee vs. Grant, the Union enjoyed a 71% advantage in the final year of the war. Vasey concluded, "So [after playing the game], my opinion of Bobby Lee was both improved and weakened. Its basic mechanisms ae very clever, but they just do not work as a historical game."

Writing for The Maneuverist, Captain William Allred USMC wrote a review about the suitability of Bobby Lee in the professional military classroom. Although Allred had many positive things to say about this game, he also pointed out the largest drawback was "the time required to learn and teach the rules" as well as the length of a game (about 4 hours.) However Allred noted that this could be overcome by providing the rules in advance and dedicating multiple session to Bobby Lee. Allred pointed out that "the disparity in resources between the Union and the Confederacy ahistorically forces the Confederate player into a defensive posture early in the war. This limits the viability of Southern invasions of Maryland and Pennsylvania, which should be feasible for Confederate players to execute." Allred also noted that "some players may find the game's treatment of emancipation overly simplistic and will likely be disappointed that it fails to model the Union's strategic imperative to prevent [foreign nations'] intervention." Allred concluded on a positive note, writing, "Bobby Lee is a fun and effective tool for teaching the concepts of maneuver and attrition and about the American Civil War. [Classroom leaders] must invest time to get maximum benefit from it."
