= EuroFront =

Board wargame

Box cover of 1st edition, 1995

EuroFront, subtitled "War in Europe, 1939-45", is a set of board wargame rules published by Columbia Games in 1995 that allows the previously published EastFront, WestFront and MedFront wargames to be combined into one campaign that simulates the entire European Theatre of World War II. In addition to the Allied and Axis counters in these three games, EuroFront also adds pieces representing many other nationalities such as Dutch, Polish and Greek.

== Description ==
Like many games published by Columbia, EuroFront is a block game, where square plastic or wooden blocks standing on edge represent military units, taking the place of more traditional die-cut cardboard counters. A sticker with the unit information is placed on the side facing the owning player. The opponent only sees the blank back of the block, resulting in an effective fog of war.

EuroFront is not a standalone game. Instead it provides a framework to combine the rules, maps and block counters from EastFront, WestFront and MedFront into one large two-player board wargame. Therefore players need to already have a copy of each of these games in order to play EuroFront.

The game is fairly complex, requiring all of the rules from the three individual games as well as a 40-page EuroFront rulebook. A large amount of table space is required, about 4 ft x 6 ft (1.2 m x 2 m), since the maps of all three games are used simultaneously. In addition to the block counters from the three games, EuroFront provides a further 80 blocks representing the military units from several smaller countries. The game comes with six scenarios, each covering one year of the war in Europe from 1939 to 1944.

In addition to the military part of the game, there is a diplomatic game that might involve the entry of another country into the war (the Soviet Union, Spain or Greece, for example), on one side or the other.

There is also a system of supply production that the players must manipulate in order to produce reinforcements in various theatres to fulfill long-term strategies.

== Publication history ==
In 1991, Columbia Games published EastFront, a block wargame designed by Craig Besinque and Tom Dalgliesh that simulated the Eastern Front of World War II. The following year, Besinque designed WestFront, covering the Western Front. This was followed by MedFront in 1994, again designed by Besinque, that covered the war in North Africa, Sicily and Italy. In 1995, Besinque created EuroFront to combine all three games together into one large European campaign.

In 2006, Besinque revised all four games, which were re-published as "Second Edition" games.

== Reception ==
In Issue 7 of Zone of Control, John Kisner noted that one of the challenges of the game was to lean over the large combination map to move units. He noted, "I'm used to paying a price of realism, but here the cost was unexpected: a sore back." Kisner found the process of using four different rulebooks "cumbersome". He also found that although "in many ways these are the finest rulebooks ever produced," in some areas they seemed "incomplete and confusing." He also noted that in comparison to other contemporaneous wargames, EuroFront seemed a bit simplistic, commenting that in other games, Soviet tank forces would be a mixture of various strengths and movement factors, while in EuroFront, "all Soviet tank armies move and attack with the same factors. This seems to give EuroFront distinctly less to offer as a simulation." However, Kisner was a strong proponent of both the production game and the diplomatic aspects. He concluded on a positive note, saying "Now in truth the block system is inconvenient at this scale — there's too much leaning and reaching. But EuroFront works so well I've come to forgive the point, and I think many of you will too. [It's] a glorious recreation of the ground war in Europe."

In Issue 45 of the Canadian Wargamers Journal, Marcel Van der Sleen commented, "For those who like monster games, this is the missing link." After a lengthy analysis, Van der Sleen concluded, "Overall I was really impressed with this addition to the Front block games. It ties the three previous games together well."

== Reviews ==
- Casus Belli #90
