= Gods of Harn =

Gods of Harn is a supplement published by Columbia Games in 1985 for the fantasy role-playing game Harn.

== Contents ==
In 1983, Columbia Games published the role-playing game Harn. Two years later, Columbia Games released Gods of Harn, a 72-page book written by N. Robin Crossby, Tom Dalgliesh, John Frazier, and Edwin King, with artwork by Eric Hotz. The book provides details of the ten deities which comprise the Harn pantheon and their religions.

Each deity is described in terms of

- their personality
- relationship to the other deities
- otherworldly servants
- their specific domain of influence
- prime moral principles of their followers
- the history and structure of their organized religion
- religious practices, including clerical orders, rituals, church politics, priestly garb, theological doctrine, iconography, saints, pilgrimages, sacred locales, religious festivals, regalia and significant dates
- notable churches dedicated to the specific deity and relative distribution across the continent

The book includes several full-color plates showing various pieces of religious garb, heraldry and badges.

Unlike other role-playing systems where deities are known to exist and can have a physical presence in the world, the deities of Harn are never seen, and the source of divine power wielded by priestly characters is unknown. As reviewer Ken Rolston noted, "Do the gods exist, or are they figments of man's imagination? Gods of Harn purports a tolerance for either view."

== Reception ==
In the November 1987 edition of Dragon (Issue #127), Ken Rolston liked the production values, saying, "The presentation is appealing — well-written, illustrated with many examples and tales, and full of dramatic elements." Rolston also found the details provided for each religion appealing, commenting that "the Harnic religions are particularly well-developed and FRP [fantasy role-playing]-oriented, with [...] all the trappings of a full-scale religion." He also noted that "The intercult and intracult conflicts also provide good sources for campaign intrigue and adventures." He concluded with a strong recommendation for players of both Harn and other role-playing games, saying, "Gods of Harn is an excellent model of an FRP campaign supplement concerning gods and religions. It's a crucial reference for players and GMs in a Harnic campaign. For GMs with D&D game-style campaign settings, it's pleasurable reading and an excellent source of good ideas."

In the July-August 1988 edition of Space Gamer/Fantasy Gamer (No. 82), J. Michael Caparula gave a mixed review, concluding, "Robin Crossby and friends are to be commended for their research and creative efforts in designing an original pantheistic system. It makes for fascinating reading, but not necessarily fascinating gaming."

== Reviews ==
- Casus Belli #76
