= 100 Bushels of Rye =

Roleplaying game adventure

100 Bushels of Rye is a 1988 role-playing game adventure for HârnMaster published by Columbia Games.

== Plot summary ==
100 Bushels of Rye is an adventure scenario which takes place in Kaldor, in which the player characters are sent to investigate a series of murders involving an iron mine and to also find out why the village of Loban has failed to pay its annual feudal commitment of 100 bushels of rye. The book includes descriptions of Loban and the mine complex.

== Publication history ==
100 Bushels of Rye was written by Garry Hamlin and Randolph L. Strommen, with art by Eric Hotz, and was published by Columbia Games in 1988 as a 32-page book.

When Columbia Games began to shift its focus toward supporting their new Hârnmaster RPG, the first ever Hârn adventures appeared, 100 Bushels of Rye (1988) and The Staff of Fanon (1988), as well as the rules-oriented Pilots' Almanac (1988), followed by a series of magic books and other RPG supplements.

== Reception ==
In the October 1989 edition of Dragon (Issue 150), Ken Rolston was impressed by this module, calling it "a perfect short adventure in a series of brief episodes, featuring a simple narrative focus, plenty of detail for each episode, challenging problem-solving (only a fraction of which involves combat), and the appealing narrative virtues of mystery, surprise, and discovery." He thought the visual presentation was "well presented, and uses a page layout ideal for quick reference during the session." He was equally as impressed with the settings, calling them "authentically medieval." Rolston concluded with a thumbs up, saying "As an example of a medieval manorial village for fantasy role-playing, and as an example of a simple, well-designed, short FRP scenario, 100 Bushels of Rye is highly recommended."
