= Gettysburg (block wargame) =

Gettysburg (also known as Gettysburg: Badges of Courage) is a block wargame. It was designed in 2004 by Tom Dalgliesh and his son, Grant Dalgliesh and produced by their game company, Columbia Games.

== Description ==
Gettysburg is a block wargame based on the three-day battle of Gettysburg during the American Civil War.

All three days of Gettysburg can be played separately or together. Players can change the entry roads of divisions to surprise opponents and must maintain division and corps organization to be successful.

The game features a brigade level order of battle with historical units and leaders. The game system rewards players who maintain division and corps integrity.

== Publication history ==
The game was first released in 2004.

== External sources ==
- Gettysburg official website
- Gettysburg at BoardGameGeek
