= Castles of Hârn =

RPG supplement published in 1987

Castles of Hârn is a 1987 role-playing game supplement for HârnMaster published by Columbia Games.

== Contents ==
Castles of Hârn is a supplement detailing the history, economics, and religious position of eight castles from throughout the world of Harn.

== Publication history ==
Castles of Hârn was written by Edwin King and Richard Porter, with art by Eric Hotz, and was published by Columbia Games in 1988 as a 64-page book.

Shannon Appelcline noted that "This was the golden age of Hârn, roughly from 1983, when Cities of Hârn was produced to 1987, when Columbia completed their coverage of the core Hârn kingdoms and started producing standalone books like Son of Cities (1987) and Castles of Hârn (1987)."

== Reception ==
Jake Thornton reviewed Castles of Harn for Games International magazine, and gave it 2 stars out of 5, and stated that "I would suggest spending the money instead on one of the excellent texts on real mediaeval fortifications. The only people that I can recommend this to are confirmed Harn addicts who probably have it already."

Ken Rolston reviewed Castles of Hârn and Castles of Orbaal in White Wolf #40 (1994) and stated that "If you run any sort of historically based low fantasy campaign - Pendragon or Ars Magica campaigns in particular - Castles of Hârn and Castles of Orbaal are just right. Other more shamelessly heroic settings (like AD&D Greyhawk or Warhammer Fantasy Role Play) may require importing loads of alien races and spell casters, but the castle plans, terrain maps and NPC thumbnails work just fine regardless."
