= Wizard Kings =

Wizard Kings is a block wargame designed in 2000 by Tom Dalgliesh and his son, Grant Dalgliesh and produced by their game company, Columbia Games.

== Description ==
Wizard Kings is a block wargame based on a generic fantasy world setting. Modular, geomorphic maps are placed next to each other (four come with the basic game, up to sixteen total are available) to create an array of battlefields.

There are seven armies in the game, Orcs, Amazons, Feudal (Humans), Dwarves, Undead, Elves, and Barbarians. Each armies are made up of various forces that come randomly in each boxed set. Booster packs are available to build larger armies and have more unit types available.

== Publication history ==
The game was first released in 2000. This first edition had armies that were sold in complete sets.

A second edition was released in 2006. In this edition, the idea of booster packs were added and many more units were released for the game.

== Reception ==
Wizard Kings is rated with a 6.7 on BoardGameGeek.

== Reviews ==
- Backstab #24

== External sources ==
- Wizard Kings official website
