= Saratoga 1777 =

Board wargame

- Cover of Rand edition
- Designers: David Isby
- Publishers: Rand Game Associates
- Publication: 1974

Saratoga 1777, subtitled "Burgoyne vs Gates", is a board wargame published by Rand Game Associates (RGA) in 1974 that simulates the Battle of Saratoga during the American Revolutionary War. At the time, this was the only board wargame based on that battle.

== Background ==
In the summer of 1777, British general John Burgoyne led a force south from Quebec down the Champlain Valley, meaning to rendezvous with two other British armies coming from New York and Niagara Falls. The three armies would then march on Albany, New York. However, the two other British armies did not arrive, and Burgoyne, rather than retreating to Fort Ticonderoga for the winter, decided to advance, and found himself surrounded by a larger American force commanded by Horatio Gates.

== Description ==
Saratoga 1777 is a two-person wargame where one person controls British forces while the other controls American forces. The game has been designed to keep the rules as simple as possible, needing only six pages to cover all standard and optional rules.The game uses only 72 counters: 40 American, 32 British. (Several commentators noted the high production quality of the counters, which were larger than usual for the time and had rounded edges for easier handling.)

The 20" x 20" paper map depicts the wilderness between Albany, St. Johns and Fort Oswego, and rather than a hex grid for movement, uses a "point to point" system, where units are moved directly from one town or geographical point to another. An optional rule allows for simultaneously revealed movement.

The game uses a standard "I Go, You Go" format where one player moves and attacks, followed by the other player, which completes one turn. The game lasts 50 turns.

Combat is resolved with a strength-ratio system that critic Laurence Gillespie called similar to Dien Bien Phu (Simulations Design Corporation, 1973). All units have the same combat power and will eliminate one-third of an enemy stack, so units are stacked in a factor of three: 3, 6, 9, etc. Players have the option to use a Combat Results Table instead, which results in varying numbers of casualties to both attacker and defender.

Supply is an important aspect of the game, and units without access to supply for three turns are removed from the game.

Other rules cover fortifications, militia, entrenchments, indigenous forces, and British rallying. One optional rule, the "Burgoyne Rule", simulates General Burgoyne's indecision by requiring the British player to roll a die before moving any unit. If the result is a 5 or 6, the unit does not move. On a 1–4, the unit moves at double speed.

=== Victory conditions ===
The British player wins by seizing Albany and inflicting American casualties. The American player wins by holding on to Albany and inflicting British casualties.

== Publication history ==
In 1974, the new game publisher RGA made the marketing decision to sell their first series of wargames via subscription rather than selling individual games in stores or via mail-order. Players who subscribed to "Command Series, Volume I" received the first game, Lee vs. Meade, packaged in an LP-sized folder, as well as a large box with enough room to store another eight games. A "Universal Command Series Package" was also included that contained a Universal Turn Recorder (a turn record track for up to 30 turns), TAC Cards (6 white cards and 6 red cards numbered from 1–6), and a six-sided die. Subsequent games then arrived every six weeks, including Saratoga 1777, a game designed by David Isby, and published by RGA. In all, RGA would publish nine games in "Command Series, Volume I".

Just as sales of the game series started in 1974, RGA made a deal with Gamut of Games, allowing the second company to sell the individual games in this series as separate boxed sets with mounted game maps. Gamut of Games' edition of Saratoga 1777 was released in 1974.

In a 1976 poll conducted by Simulations Publications Inc. to determine the most popular board wargames in North America, Saratoga 1777 placed a dismal 198th out of 202 games.

== Reception ==
In Issue 17 of Moves, game designer Richard Berg compared Rand's games Lee vs. Meade and Saratoga 1777. In both games, Berg lauded the production values, calling the counters "the finest available, sturdy and handsome, with rounded edges for easy handling." Berg wasn't too impressed with Lee vs. Meade, but found Saratoga 1777 "a distinct improvement." Berg noted the game's point-to-point movement system had "more than a passing resemblance to Gamma Two's Quebec 1759 [1972] and War of 1812 [1973]." Berg noted "the play moves quickly and, after some initial jockeying, combat occurs relatively frequently. The result is a fairly tense game of attrition and position ... Supply is simple and effective, and the rules have few loopholes." On the negative side, Berg pointed out that because in combat, each player has an even chance, "This means, the die rather than sound strategy plays the upper role in the outcome." Berg concluded, "if you can resolve yourself to the tyranny of the die you can be relatively happy with Saratoga ... This is an enjoyment somewhat tempered by the palsied hand of fate, but it is a distinct improvement over its predecessor [Lee vs. Meade]."

In the January 1976 edition of Airfix Magazine, Bruce Quarrie reviewed the Gamut of Games edition and thought it was "plushly presented, with a solid board and large unit counters which even the clumsiest of little fingers would not upset." But Quarrie found the rules "primitive" and opined that "It seems to be the rule that the better the presentation and appearance to the eye of a board wargame, the more basic is the content." Quarrie also found that the optional rules placed too much reliance on the luck of the dice. Quarrie concluded, "Obviously this is not a game for the established player, although considering its limitations it can produce a good campaign. It is an excellent introduction to gaming, however, being easy to play while incorporating many features of more complicated games on to which young Johnny will hopefully pass."

In his 1977 book The Comprehensive Guide to Board Wargaming, Nicky Palmer noted that "this appears to be the only simulation of the Saratogan battle, with the American Revolution little covered [by other wargames] from the tactical viewpoint."

In Issue 54 of Zeppelin, Laurence Gillespie liked the quality of the counters, but thought the paper map in Rand's edition of the game was "flimsy". However, Gillespie noted the clarity of the rules, writing, "In what is extremely unusual for a Rand Game, the rules are fairly clear and simple, without undue attention to minor historical details." Gillespie concluded by questioning the game's balance and also its historical accuracy.

== Other commentary and reviews ==
- Panzerfaust #63
