= 1994 in games =

This page lists board and card games, wargames, miniatures games, and tabletop role-playing games published in 1994. For video games, see 1994 in video gaming.

== Games released or invented in 1994 ==
- Australian Rails
- BattleTech Tactical Handbook
- Castle Falkenstein (role-playing game)
- CityTech (2nd edition)
- Crosstrack
- Dixie - Bull Run
- Dixie - Gettysburg
- Dixie - Shiloh
- Don't Look Back (role-playing game)
- Doom Trooper Collectible Card Game
- Galactic Empires
- HoL: Human Occupied Landfill (role-playing game)
- Illuminati: New World Order
- I'm the Boss!
- Jyhad (AKA Vampire: The Eternal Struggle)
- Monster Derby
- NFL Fantasy Football
- On the Edge
- Once Upon a Time
- Planescape (campaign setting for Dungeons & Dragons)
- RoboRally
- Spellfire
- Star Trek Customizable Card Game
- Super Deck!
- Talk Dirty to Me
- Via Prudensiae (role-playing game)
- Wraith: The Oblivion (role-playing game)

== Game awards given in 1994 ==
- Spiel des Jahres: Manhattan

== Significant game-related events in 1994 ==
- Avalanche Press was founded by Mike Bennighof and Brian Knipple.
- Hasbro bought Waddingtons, a British game manufacturer.

== Deaths ==
Date	Name	Age	Notability
	Peter Adolph	52	Designer of Subbuteo
April 9	Anthony E. Pratt	90	Designer of Cluedo
November 30	Guy Debord	62	Author and designer of Le Jeu de la Guerre

== See also ==
- 1994 in video gaming
