= Araka-Kalai =

Role-playing game supplement

- Publishers: Columbia Games
- Publication: 1987
- Genres: Role-playing
- Parent games: HârnMaster
- ISBN: 9780920711200

Araka-Kalai is a role-playing game supplement for HârnMaster published by Columbia Games in 1987.

== Publication history ==
Araka-Kalai was the first supplement created for HârnMaster, written by Edwin King and Dave Kowan, with art by Eric Hotz. It was published in 1987 by Columbia Games as a 44-page book, with two center-bound cardstock character sheets.

== Contents ==
Araka-Kalai is a campaign setting centred on the Pit of Araka-Kalai, a massive toxic sinkhole, and the undiscovered caves underneath it, which include creatures, shrines, and cults. The Pit itself is filled with a strange organic sludge as well as the ruined temple of the god Ilvir.

The supplement includes seven short adventure scenarios which take place in the area, although several of the scenarios are only undetailed sketches. Reviewer Ken Rolston noted that "The adventures themselves are really little more than scenario outlines, though one or two provide enough detail to qualify as complete adventures."

== Reception ==
In the October 1989 edition of Dragon, Ken Rolston was impressed with the production values and writing, noting that "The graphics are excellent, with color maps, abundant diagrams of locations and buildings, and appropriate, expressive illustrations of scenes, characters, and creatures. The style of presentation is clear and detailed, and is dry with an occasional droll impulse. It is well organized for reading and reference. And the campaign materials — well, they’re voluminous, historically and socially plausible, and full of dramatic fantasy adventure and thematic hooks." Given the originality of the setting versus the paucity of detail in the adventure scenarios, Rolston thought that it was "more distinguished as a campaign setting than an adventure supplement". Nevertheless he gave it a thumbs up, saying, "This is a strongly recommended adventure setting."
