= Rommel in the Desert =

WWII block wargame

Original edition, The Game Preserve, 1982

Rommel in the Desert is a block wargame published by The Game Preserve in 1982 that simulates the North African campaign during World War II.

== Description ==
Rommel in the Desert is a board wargame for two players in which one player controls Axis forces and the other Allied forces. The hex grid map is only 8 hexes wide, but very long, running from El Agheila to Alexandria. Instead of cardboard counters, the units are represented by small wooden blocks — red for Allies, black for Axis — that stand on their side with the unit information facing away from the opposing player. Thus, the opponent does not know the unit's type or strength until it is engaged in combat. Supplies are represented by yellow blocks, and are needed for any unit to move and attack.

During each turn, players alternate moving and fighting until both players pass on further action, usually due to the lack of supplies.

When units engage in combat, the involved units are laid flat, exposing their strength. The units then alternate firing at each other. The owning player rolls a number of dice equal to the strength of the attacking unit; each die that rolls a six reduces the defending unit's combat value by 1. If the defending unit's combat value reaches zero, the unit is eliminated.

=== Scenarios ===
Three scenarios are provided:

- "1940", a short introductory scenario
- "1941"
- "1942"

Both "1941 and "1942" are ten turns in length, which each take about six hours to play. The two can be combined into a 20-turn campaign game.

2nd edition, Columbia Games, 1984. Cover art by Ron Gibson and Eric Hotz

== Publication history ==
Rommel in the Desert was created by Craig Besinque and 800 copies with a black & white map and black & white block stickers were published in 1981 by The Game Preserve. Columbia Games acquired the game, and published 5000 copies of a second edition in 1984 that had revised rules, cover art by Ron Gibson and Eric Hotz, and full-colour block stickers and map. The yellow supply blocks were replaced by a deck of yellow cards. Columbia published a third edition in 2004 featuring new cover art by Jody Harmon, and a Spanish edition in 2024.

== Reception ==
In Issue 27 of The Wargamer, Jay Selover noted the long, narrow map, wooden blocks and atypical combat rules, and commented "Everything about this game is unusual … The heart of the game system is unusual, the movement rules are innovative and the combat rules are weird." However, Selover called the combat rules the "weakest aspect" of the game, commenting, "There are no overruns, no benefit for combined-arms attacks, and no terrain." But Selover admitted "Still, Rommel in the Desert does give a pretty good lesson on North Africa." Selover concluded that the game "walks a fine line between being a truly innovative design and being just gimmicky; between being a good enjoyable 'game' and being just superficial. Fortunately, it is on the right side of that line most of the way. It's fun!"

In Issue 58 of Fire & Movement, John Setear noted that some wargames "have included some serious efforts to reflect at least a single aspect of the fog of war. Columbia Game's Rommel in the Desert actually includes at least two —unit values and supply — and arguably even introduces some uncertainty about the laws of war governing combat with an intricate and interactive system of resolving series of battles."

In a retrospective review in Issue 1 of Simulacrum, John Kula noted, "Of all the 60-odd North African theater games I have owned over the years, RitD is one of my two favourites ... No other games come as close to capturing what I understand to be the essence of desert warfare: the inhospitable and almost endless tracts of sand, gravel and rock that impose no limitations on time and space but enormous limitations on supply."

In the same issue of Simulacrum, Brandon Einmhorn provided an opposing point of view, commenting, "When I actually played the game, I was greatly disappointed. I feel the game is a very poor simulation … There were many rules that could be improved or brought up to date, and many things I would abstract or modify." Einhorn concluded, "RitD was designed with clean rules and mechanics, but it's not a simulation, and with a little more effort and not much dirt, it could be improved."
