= Cities of Hârn =

Tabletop fantasy role-playing game supplement

- Designers: N. Robin Crossby
- Publishers: Columbia Games
- Publication: 1983; 42 years ago
- Genres: Fantasy

Cities of Hârn is a universal fantasy role-playing game supplement published by Columbia Games in 1983.

== Contents ==
Cities of Hârn, written by N. Robin Crossby, is a 48-page softcover guide that details the seven major cities located on the island-continent of Hârn. Written three years before the role-playing game Harnmaster was released, this book was not written for any specific game system, allowing the gamemaster to adapt the materials to any role-playing game.

An introduction explains the mapping system used in the book, and gives a general account of life in the cities, including lifestyle, government, layout, and taxation.

The next section outlines the seven cities, giving complete histories, and typical buildings. There are many maps and blueprints included in the book, using scales that range from 1:2,000,000 to 1:300.

== Reception ==
Simon Farrell reviewed Cities of Hârn for White Dwarf #56, giving it an overall rating of 6 out of 10, and stated that "Cities of Harn details the seven major cities of the island with some excellent maps."

In the November–December 1984 edition of Space Gamer (No. 71), Steve Jackson gave a thumbs up to this book, saying, "All in all, this supplement will be of great interest to those who liked Harn, and is worth a look by any referee in need of city-building ideas. The only real problem, as with other Columbia products, is the price. Many will feel [the price] is too much to pay for a single 64-page book. If that does not deter you, by all means look at Cities of Harn.

In the March 1986 edition of Dragon (Issue 107), although Eric Pass complimented the product for being "richly detailed and fully consistent", he thought that not enough information was provided to run an encounter. He also found the price of the book rather high, but concluded that the book "contains well-constructed, consistent, interesting information that will take hours to absorb. Keep a notebook by your side as you read, because you’ll get all sorts of ideas for play."
