= Tome of the Ancient and Esoteric Mysteries of the Powers of Peleahn =

Tabletop role-playing game supplement

Tome of the Ancient and Esoteric Mysteries of the Powers of Peleahn is a supplement published by Columbia Games in 1989 for the fantasy role-playing game HârnMaster.

== Contents ==
Tome of the Ancient and Esoteric Mysteries of the Powers of Peleahn is a supplement which contains 24 new spells dealing with fire, which is the element of the god Peleahn. The book also lists Peleahnian lodges of magic as well as those of the Arcane Guild.

== Publication history ==
This 28-page saddle-stitched book written by N. Robin Crossby and with additional material by Rob Duff, Neil H. Hewitson, Edwin King, Simon Matthews, and Jim Sanderson, was the second of six books published in the Tome of the Ancient and Esoteric Mysteries series. Artwork and cover art was by Eric Hotz.

== Reception ==
Stewart Wieck reviewed Tome of the Ancient and Esoteric Mysteries of the Powers of Peleahn for White Wolf #20, rating it 3 out of 5 overall, and stated that "while the spells are average overall, a HarnMaster fan will likely find the compendium useful."
