= The Staff of Fanon =

RPG adventure published in 1988

The Staff of Fanon is a 1988 role-playing game adventure for HârnMaster published by Columbia Games.

== Plot summary ==
The Staff of Fanon is an adventure which forms the first adventure a trilogy of modules.

== Publication history ==
The Staff of Fanon was written by N. Robin Crossby, with art by Eric Hotz, and was published by Columbia Games in 1988 as a 32-page book.

Shannon Appelcline explained that by 1988 Columbia Games began focusing on product lines other than Harn: "That began when Columbia shifted their focus toward supporting their new Hârnmaster RPG, rather than playing to their strengths and supporting the setting of Hârn. Thus the first ever Hârn adventures appeared, 100 Bushels of Rye (1988) and The Staff of Fanon (1988), as well as the rules-oriented Pilots' Almanac (1988). They were followed by a series of magic books and other RPG supplements." Appelcline noted that years later, "In order to fill the void left by the lack of official Hârn setting support, fans increasingly began to add their own expansions. Where official Hârn material was called "canon" this new fan-created material — not official but still carefully integrated into the background — was instead called "fanon" after the Staff of Fanon adventure."

== Reception ==
Jake Thornton reviewed The Staff of Fanon for Games International magazine, and gave it 3 stars out of 5, and stated that "The Staff of Fanon is a well-written, uncomplicated adventure of a traditional, almost old-fashioned style, which will fit into most existing campaigns. It is not outstanding, in originality or innovative in content. It is competently written and attractively presented."

In Issue 150 of Dragon (October 1989), Ken Rolston called it "a skillfully presented, imaginative example of a high-fantasy adventure with inter-world gateways, powerful sorcery, ancient races, marvelous beings, and fantastic labyrinthine dwellings chock-a-block with magical traps and treasures and nasty daemonic entities. Most important, it looks like fun both to run and to play."
