= Lionheart (supplement) =

Role-playing game supplement

Lionheart is a role-playing supplement published by Columbia Games in 1987 that describes the society, history and geography of Great Britain as of the year 1190 CE.

== Contents ==
Lionheart is a supplement in which the British Isles are detailed around the year 1190. As critic Tristan Lhomme noted, "the reader is treated to a comprehensive overview of English history, from the Romans to Richard the Lionheart." Also included are characters, places and customs.

Lionheart: Living in History, England 1190 provides a detailed historical and geographical overview of England in the 1190s. It uses 12th-century terminology and covers the history of England from Roman times to the reign of King Richard, including Ireland and Scotland. The core of the book is a glossary of towns, castles, landmarks, terminology, and local mythology and history. It includes a Welsh and Gaelic pronunciation guide and explains what the differences are between serfs, cottagers, and villeins. Religious orders and churches are described with brief histories and locations. Accompanying the book is a 21x31-inch color map printed on heavy paper, depicting England, Scotland, Ireland, and part of the French coastline as they were in 1190. The map shows Roman roads and lesser-used roads, researched to reflect the coastlines of the time. The book serves as a guide to the British Isles as they were in the late 12th century, with a bibliography to provide further reference. It is 112 pages long, and has colored cardstock covers and interior illustrations from old plates and maps.

The game does not contain any rules, and has been designed to be usable as the setting for any role-playing game.

== Publication history ==
Lionheart was written by Edwin King, with art by Eric Hotz, and was published by Columbia Games in 1987 as a 112-page book with a large bound-in color map.

== Reception ==
Allen Mixson reviewed Lionheart in White Wolf #28 (Aug./Sept., 1991), rating it a 5 out of 5 and stated that "You may want more than what the book offers, but you won't get a face full of dry, boring prattle. The information is very reader-friendly. I give this work the highest rating based upon the fact that if your campaign can use the information and map contained in the work, you would have to search real hard to find an equal or better source."

In Issue 69 of the French games magazine Casus Belli, Tristan Lhomme noted, "England in the first millennium experienced invasions, civil wars and other joys at a pace rarely achieved elsewhere. The first twenty-five pages therefore read almost like a novel." Lhomme concluded, "In short, an interesting supplement for game leaders wishing to play in England of the 11th and 12th centuries and having a ready-made game system."

== Reviews ==
- Beaumains #4 (Feb., 1994)
- Abyss #42 (Summer, 1988)
