= Eagles (card game) =

Collectible card game

- Cardback to the Eagles CCG
- Designers: Tom Dalgliesh
- Publishers: Columbia Games
- Players: 2 or more
- Setup time: < 5 minutes
- Playing time: < 60 minutes

Eagles, also called Eagles: Waterloo, is an out-of-print collectible card game (CCG) published by Columbia Games in 1995.

== Description ==
Eagles is a CCG designed by Tom Dalgliesh. The game is similar in set-up and strategy to Columbia's Dixie CCG released the previous year, albeit with expanded rules, and set in the days of the Napoleonic Wars. The game recreates Napoleon's Waterloo campaign during the Hundred Days.

The base set has 300 cards with a total of 900 variants, and the battle deck can consist of 60 or 120 cards representing the French, British, Dutch and Prussian regiments. The cards had no rarity. Instead each card was printed in three versions: Gold, Silver, and Bronze. Every card was individually available or sold as a complete set via direct order from the company.

== Reception ==
In Issue 92 of the British wargame magazine Perfidious Albion, Charles Vasey called this "a very playable game with minimal pain and for these alone a great success. However, like all simple games it can begin to pall if you find it does not work for you."

In the August 1996 edition of Dragon (Issue 232), Rick Swan liked the game, saying, "It isn't fantasy, you say, but who cares? You might be surprised to learn the tactics aren't all that different from those in Magic: The Gathering." He concluded, "If you're the adventurous type, you still ought to give this a look."

In the Scrye Collectible Card Game Checklist & Price Guide, Second Edition (2003), John Jackson Miller considered the game to be "very playable".
