= Nasty, Brutish and Short =

Nasty, Brutish and Short is a 1997 role-playing game supplement published by Columbia Games for HârnMaster.

== Contents ==
Nasty, Brutish and Short is a supplement in which the focus is on the gargun—Hârn’s orc equivalents—offering a detailed exploration of their culture, biology, and stronghold geography. Each featured gargun stronghold is paired with one or more scenarios, some leaning into classic dungeon-crawl brutality, while others offer intrigue. These include orcs seeking alliances with humans, illicit arms deals via rogue mercenaries, and a tangled web of betrayal that draws in factions like the Church of Agrik and the Thieves' Guild. The final adventure escalates into an epic confrontation as a rogue Shek-Pvar attempts to resurrect Lothrim's long-defunct empire. Although tailored for 2nd edition HârnMaster, conversion notes support adaptation to other systems.

== Reception ==
Ken Walton reviewed Nasty, Brutish and Short for Arcane magazine, rating it an 8 out of 10 overall, and stated that "Altogether, a good supplement for the dedicated Наrn fan, though newcomers may want to start with something a little less specific, such as one of the kingdom modules."

== Reviews ==
- Dragon #243
- Rollespilsmagasinet Fønix (Issue 17 - June 1997)
