= Keléstia Productions =

Game publisher

Keléstia Productions is a Canadian publisher of materials for use with Hârn, a role-playing game. Keléstia Productions was founded by N. Robin Crossby, the original creator of Hârn, following his separation with Columbia Games. Since Crossby's death in 2008, Keléstia Productions has continued as company owned by Crossby's estate.

== History ==
N. Robin Crossby left Columbia Games in 1994, after the company had published Hârn setting for more than a decade. Columbia maintained that they had rights to Hârn, but Crossby self-published Hârnmaster Gold (1998) as a competitor to the Hârn.

Crossby ended his contract with Columbia Games in 2003 and formed his own company called Keléstia Productions so he could continue publishing Hârn, although Columbia would not recognize his ability to terminate their agreement. Starting in 2003, Keléstia published only in PDFs.

Crossby became ill around 2006 and died in 2008, and his oldest daughter Arien has continued publication of his "Hârn Canon" through Keléstia. In 2009, the Canadian Intellectual Property Office granted Keléstia a trademark to the name Hârn.
