= Craig Besinque =

Wargame designer (born 1946)

Craig Besinque (born 1946) is a wargame designer from British Columbia, Canada, who grew up in Arcadia, California. Most of his games are block wargames which have World War II as a theme. In 1991, his game East Front, co-designed with Tom Dalgliesh, won the Charles S. Roberts Award for Best World War Two Game, a James F. Dunnigan Award for playability and design, and the Origins Award for best Modern-era wargame. His game Triumph & Tragedy was the runner-up for the best 2015 Golden Geek Wargame. His other popular games have included Rommel in the Desert and Hellenes: Campaigns of the Peloponnesian War.
