= Julius Caesar (block wargame) =

Block wargame

Julius Caesar is a block wargame designed in 2000 by Justin Thompson and Grant Dalgliesh and produced by Columbia Games.

== Description ==
Julius Caesar is a card driven block wargame based on the Roman Civil War. Players take control of the legions of Julius Caesar or Pompey and fight to determine the future of Rome. Marc Antony, Cleopatra, Octavian, and Brutus also play key roles in the game.

== Publication history ==
The game was released by Columbia Games in 2010.

== Reception ==
BoardGameGeek has Julius Caesar noted as #35 on its best wargames of all time.

Julius Caesar is rated with a 7.8 on BoardGameGeek.
