= Pilots' Almanac =

1988 Role playing game

Pilots' Almanac is a 1988 role-playing game supplement for HârnMaster published by Columbia Games.

== Contents ==
Pilots' Almanac is a supplement in which rules and information are presented for ship movement, navigation, and weather.

== Publication history ==
The Pilots' Almanac was written by N. Robin Crossby and Tom Dalgliesh, with art by Eric Hotz, and was published by Columbia Games in 1988 as a 64-page book with four center-bound color maps.

Shannon Appelcline explained that by 1988 Columbia Games began focusing on product lines other than Harn: "That began when Columbia shifted their focus toward supporting their new Hârnmaster RPG, rather than playing to their strengths and supporting the setting of Hârn. Thus the first ever Hârn adventures appeared, 100 Bushels of Rye (1988) and The Staff of Fanon (1988), as well as the rules-oriented Pilots' Almanac (1988). They were followed by a series of magic books and other RPG supplements."

== Reception ==
Jake Thornton reviewed Pilots' Almanac for Games International magazine, and gave it 4 1/2 stars out of 5, and stated that "To make full use of this product you need to understand the Harnmaster skill system. If you do, then buy it."
