= HârnMaster =

Role-playing game

- Cover of 3rd edition
- Designers: N. Robin Crossby
- Publishers: Columbia Games, Kelestia Productions
- Publication: 1986 (1st edition); 1996 (2nd edition); 2002 (3rd edition)
- Genres: Fantasy
- Systems: Custom

HârnMaster is a fantasy role-playing game based in the fantasy world of Hârn. The system, like the world, was designed primarily by N. Robin Crossby.

== History ==
Hârnmaster was published as a role-playing game using the Hârn setting by Columbia Games in 1986. All previously published Hârn supplements were intended to be system independent but Columbia gauged reader interest and decided to produce a game system specifically for the Hârn setting. N. Robin Crossby led the design and based the new game on notes for designs that he had saved from the 1970s. Columbia began to focus on supporting the Hârnmaster role-playing game rather than just the setting, and published their first ever Hârn adventures, 100 Bushels of Rye (1988) and The Staff of Fanon (1988), and the rules supplement Pilots' Almanac (1988), followed books about magic and other supplements for the game. Columbia also resumed publication wargames including the Hârn miniatures wargame Battle Lust (1992), designed to be compatible with Hârnmaster. Columbia produced a few more adventures along with a second edition (1996) of Hârnmaster which was a simpler version of the game with the magic systems moved into the supplements Hârnmaster Magic (1997) and Hârnmaster Religion (1998), and the rulebooks Hârnmaster Manor (1999) and Hârnmaster Barbarians (2000) to finish the line. Crossby created his own version of the game, Hârnmaster Gold (1998), using rules that he intended to increase realism. When the d20 System came out, Columbia reprinted some of their setting material including Trobridge Inn (2001) and Evael: Kingdom of the Elves (2002) with dual game statistics for Hârnmaster and d20. Keléstia Productions began publication with the Hârnmaster Gold Player Edition (2003), and additional rule books after. Columbia began work on a more streamlined third edition of Hârnmaster (2003).

=== Supplements ===
Additional supplements were published for the game, including Castles of Hârn (1987), Tome of the Ancient and Esoteric Mysteries of the Powers of Peleahn (1989), and Nasty, Brutish and Short (1997).

== Publishing history ==
HârnMaster products are available from original publisher and from the original author and his heirs. Each edition has different strengths:

The first edition HârnMaster was published in 1986 by Columbia Games and is not available.

The second edition HârnMaster core rules were published by Columbia Games in 1996, to be followed by supplements such as HârnMaster Religion, HârnMaster Magic, HârnMaster Barbarians, and HârnManor (a set of rules for developing consistent medieval manors for use as role-playing settings).

In 1998, N. Robin Crossby self-published the HârnMaster Gold (HMG) player edition. He called this release HârnMaster Gold v. 2.0, and designated the first edition as HârnMaster Gold v. 1.0.

In 2002, Columbia Games published HârnMaster third edition.

In 2003 Crossby formed Keléstia Productions, and published HârnMaster Gold v. 2.1 Player Edition and Gamemaster Edition, with an additional HMG magic rules supplement in 2004.

In 2024, Keléstia Productions published what is commonly called HârnMaster Kèthîra (a shortening of "HârnMaster: Roleplaying in the World of Kèthîra"), building on HârnMaster Gold and adding substantial material for creating characters in other regions of Kèthîra, aka HârnWorld.

== Rules ==
Hârnmaster characters are described primarily by their attributes and skills. Attributes are initially generated in the range of 3-18 and may be modified by race, background, gender, or medical conditions. Compared to many other games, Hârnmaster has a very large and detailed set of attributes. In addition to the common qualities of Strength, Stamina, and Intelligence, etc., Hârnmaster attributes independently measure a character's eyesight, hearing, and sense of smell, his physical attractiveness (to a member of the same species), both manual and bodily dexterity, willpower, and psychic strength. In addition to these basic attributes, a number of derived attributes (such as Endurance, derived from Strength, Stamina, and Will) are used to describe a character's basic qualities and abilities.

Attributes are also used as a basis for the skill system, which is the core mechanism for combat and non-combat task resolution. The Hârnmaster system provides no character classes, instead using a character's background (which is generated in great detail) to determine his initial skills. A character generally begins play with several sets of skills:

- Automatic skills, which any character can attempt to use without training. This includes common tasks such as climbing and jumping, common knowledge, and basic social skills.
- Family skills, determined by the player character's family background. Characters are assumed to have worked in the occupation of their parent (or other guardian) until the age of 10-12, and have basic skills in these occupations.
- Occupational skills, derived from the character's employment. These skills can be entirely distinct from family skills (if the character did not follow his parents' occupation), or can be an improvement to the family skills that were already gained (someone who was raised by fishermen begins play as a better fisherman than one who was raised by woodcarvers).
- Optional militia skills, which can represent rudimentary combat training for a character whose primary occupation is not combat related.

Each skill is improved independently, in response to use in play or to study and training. There are no theoretical limitations on what skills a character can learn; a priest or wizard is free to learn combat skills of any type, and a knight or soldier is free to focus on knowledge skills or stealth and thievery. In practice, skill acquisition and advancement can be limited by in-game circumstances, such as the availability of a teacher or social norms (non-noble characters, for instance, are prohibited from owning certain weapons- making it difficult for non-noble characters to attain proficiency with these weapons).

While attributes are rated on a 3-18 scale, skills are rated from 1-95 and attempts to use skills are resolved with a 1d100 roll. Attributes are tested directly by multiplying the attribute by a number between 1 and 5 (depending on the difficulty of the task), and rolling a 1d100. Penalties to skill or attribute checks- due to fatigue, injury, encumbrance, or other circumstances- decrease the 'target' number that the player must roll under in order to succeed. Successes or failures by rolls that end in 5 are considered to be Critical Success or Critical Failure; other successes and failures are rated as Marginal. Conflicts between two characters- such as combat- are resolved by cross referencing the degrees of success and failure of each party on a chart. For example, in combat, a Critical Success for an attacker combined with Critical Failure for a defender would mean that a particularly fierce blow had been struck. Critical Success for a defender and Critical Failure for the attacker might indicate that not only had a blow been blocked or dodged, but that the attacker may have been thrown off balance, disarmed, or put at a tactical disadvantage. More moderate results would result in more modest successes for one party, or a temporary stalemate.

In combat, each injury is tracked individually, rather than subtracting from a pool of Hit Points or Life Points. More serious injuries introduce the risk of a character being knocked unconscious from shock, being instantly killed, or (optionally) losing a limb. A character may also be killed or knocked unconscious by blood loss or a combination of lesser injuries. Unhealed injuries penalize a character's actions, including combat actions, reducing their overall effectiveness. Each injury heals at a different rate, depending on its severity, and open wounds have the potential to become infected, slowing healing and possibly causing death. Permanent injuries- either in the form of amputated or otherwise lost limbs- or attribute penalties caused by poorly-healed injuries are also a possibility. The combat and injury system is quite lethal, compared to many roleplaying systems. Even for veteran characters, combat with a skilled opponent or a sneak attack by an opponent armed with a modest weapon can lead to death in a single strike; an unarmed blow to the neck or a bowshot to the eye can be fatal.

The magic system is based around six elemental principles: Lyahvi (Air/Light/Illusion), Peleahn (Fire), Jmorvi (Metal/Artifice), Fyrvia (Life/Growth/Decay), Odivshe (Water/Cold), and Savorya (Mind/Spirit/Knowledge). The principles are arranged in a wheel, with Lyahvi being opposed to Fyrvia, Peleahn to Odivshe, and Jmorvi to Savorya. Mages, known as Shek-Pvar, begin their careers attuned to one of the elements, and are said to be in that elemental convocation. Spells are learned as skills, with substantial bonuses for spells in one's own convocation, substantial penalties for spells in the opposing convocation, and smaller effects for the other convocations; there are also neutral spells which are not part of any convocation, and common spells for which a version exists in each convocation. Eventually a mage can become a grey mage, losing both the penalties and bonuses based on spells' elemental alignment. The system also has rules for researching and learning new spells as well as creating spells "on the fly" (usually with a large chance of failure).

Characters track a piety level with their patron deity, if any (Hârn has ten well-detailed major deities and a larger number of lesser ones). Characters with high piety scores and proper priestly training may then petition their deity for miracles appropriate to the deity's nature (healing, divination, sustenance, etc.).

There are also rules for psionic abilities (telepathy, telekinesis, precognition, etc.) which are handled in the same way as other skills.

== Reception ==
In Issue 6 of The Games Machine (May 1988), John Woods was pleased by the quality of Harnmaster, commenting that "The layout of the book has a business-like feel that suits the style of the rules well." He liked the open-ended feel of the character generation rules, and thought the "complex but understandable" combat system "is the most thorough and realistic fantasy combat system I’ve seen." He admitted that its complexity would slow play down somewhat, but he pointed out that the gruesomely realistic consequences of combat wounds would force most players "to avoid combat wherever possible - a very satisfactory situation. Too many GMs and players rely on monster-bashing to the exclusion of role-playing, and it is good to see a system that encourages the opposite trend." He recommended this for players willing to put in the time and effort to learn it well, saying, "Harnmaster is a system for the purist. Whilst the rules are exceedingly clearly written throughout, they will take time and effort to master, and compared to simpler systems will always require more work and thought from players and GMs alike in play." He concluded, "If you enjoy realism in role-playing, give Harnmaster a try."

In the March 1989 edition of Games International (Issue #3), Jake Thornton questioned why this game had not achieved the same level of market saturation as some other role-playing games, since he believed that it did just as good a job of outlining its mechanics. He did admit that the magic system was rather unexciting, but commented that "Happily the mechanics for combat are more interesting." He concluded by giving the game an average rating of 3.5 out of 5, saying, "Harnmaster is not a particularly innovative game, relying in general on tried and trusted ideas. Despite this, the clarity of writing and layout together with the sheer volume of ready made background and support material must make it an attractive alternative for those who like a wealth of detail but haven't got the time themselves."

In the October 1989 edition of Dragon, Ken Rolston reviewed both HârnMaster and its first supplementary adventure, Araka-Kalai, published in 1987. Rolston called HârnMaster "a comprehensive, logical, authentic 'medieval' fantasy campaign setting [with] epic scale and original concept"; he considered it "state of the art" compared to all other major competitors. Rolston's only criticism "was the absence of published examples of adventures", apparently "perceived as a virtue by Columbia Games." In considering the adventure Araka-Kalai, Rolston commented that "The graphics are excellent, with color maps, abundant diagrams of locations and buildings, and appropriate, expressive illustrations of scenes, characters, and creatures. The style of presentation is clear and detailed, and is dry with an occasional droll impulse. It is well organized for reading and reference. And the campaign materials — well, they’re voluminous, historically and socially plausible, and full of dramatic fantasy adventure and thematic hooks." He felt the setting was so original that it was "more distinguished as a campaign setting than an adventure supplement" and gave it a thumbs up, saying, "This is a strongly recommended adventure setting."

In Issue 13 of Arcane (December 1996), Andy Butcher reviewed the second edition of Harmaster, and thought the streamlining of the rules, with complexities shunted off into an "optional rules" section made the game "easier to learn and understand, it gives referees the chance to customise the level of detail used in their games." Butcher also liked the new three-ring binder format, allowing future additions to be added to various parts of the binder. However, Butcher still felt the Harnmaster system's weakness was the lack of religion and magic, saying, "It would have been better to drop the psionic rules and campaign background sections and at least present the basics of the magic and religion rules." He concluded by giving the second edition of Harnmaster a below-average rating 6 out of 10, commenting, "A detailed fantasy system that's logically structured and well designed. Unfortunately, the presentation and high quality of the writing and design don't quite make up for the lack of rules for magic and religion. If you want to run a historically based 'low fantasy' campaign, though, it could be what you're looking for."
