= Ivinia =

Role-playing game supplement

Ivinia, subtitled "The Viking Lands", is a supplement published by Columbia Games in 1985 for the fantasy role-playing game Hârn.

== Contents ==
Ivinia details an area to the northeast of the continent of Hârn that is populated by small clans of farmers. While Hârn has a feudal English background, Ivinia evokes a Viking flavour. The book is divided into an overview and an index, and the boxed set contains a 22" x 34" full-colour map.

== Publication history ==
N. Robin Crossby designed the fictional world of Hârn and founded Columbia Games in 1983 to publish it. Two years later Crossby created a Nordic setting that could be used in Hârn campaigns, Ivinia. The boxed set contained an 80-page softcover book and a map.

== Reception ==
In the September–October 1985 edition of Space Gamer (No. 76), David Noel was somewhat put off by the high retail price, commenting "Overall, Ivinia is an excellent product, and I recommend it to anyone who uses Harn or is looking for a fantasy setting with a definite Norse flavor. The high price is a drawback, and I would not recommend it to those who are only looking for source material for their campaigns."

In the March 1986 edition of Dragon (Issue 107), Eric Pass also noted the high retail cost, saying he found it hard to justify. But Pass admitted that the book contained "a staggering amount of detail" and that the map "is simply beautiful, of a style and quality reminiscent of the full-sized maps found in National Geographic." He concluded, "This material is a savior for the hard-pressed GM whose players expect and demand detailed playing environments and backgrounds."
