= High Colonies =

Science fiction role-playing game

- Cover art by Eric Hotz
- Designers: Eric Hotz; Edwin King
- Illustrators: Eric Hotz
- Publishers: Waterford Publishing House
- Publication: 1988
- Genres: Hard science fiction

High Colonies is a hard science fiction role-playing game published by the Canadian firm Waterford Publishing House in 1988.

== Description ==
High Colonies is a science-fiction space-adventure game, a hard science system set in 2188. The Earth has been ravaged by a nuclear/biological holocaust, and human society has continued only in the orbital colonies that surround Earth and are scattered throughout the Solar System. Each space colony is a self-contained ecology with a unique culture, ideology, and legal system. Some of the colonies have banded together with others of like ideology, in opposition to other groups of colonies.

The game includes rules for character creation (a skill-based system), robots, one alien race, genetic engineering, melee combat (between people and/or robots), and spaceship combat. There is campaign setting material describing the factions that control the various colonies, and an introductory scenario, "Hard Times at Lyric 3."

== Publication history ==
High Colonies was designed by Eric Hotz and Edwin King, and Hotz also created the artwork. The 104-page book was published by Waterford Publishing House in 1988.

== Reception ==
In Issue 15 of White Wolf (April–May 1989), Stewart Wieck called the combat system "well geared for a game in which the players are likely to want to play soldier-type characters ... [utilizing] many different modifiers which create a sense of realism, but which also add to the complexity of the system." Wieck concluded by giving this game a rating of 4 out of 5, saying, " If you are looking for a game system to use to play a gritty, hard science fiction campaign with, I would recommend High Colonies."

In Issue 43 of Abyss (Spring 1989), Dave Nalle liked the very in-depth background information at the front of the book to be "fairly interesting ... easy to assimilate and explain to players." However, Nalle thought the character generation system based on rolls of three six-sided dice was out of date, and would have preferred seeing something "being done on a more contemporary system like point allocation." Nalle also had issues with the skill system, pointing out "All skills essentially have the same cost [during character generation], which means that differentiation for difficulty is not a feature of the game, which detracts from realism considerably." Nalle also found the list of available skills "rather short and there are a number of areas where expansion would be valuable." Nalle thought the combat system was weak, using as an example that it used the same "primitive" initiative system first developed for Dungeons & Dragons almost 15 year previous. Nalle concluded, "High Colonies is a playable game with a good background. All the best material is put up front in the rule book and the rather less impressive mechanics are wisely kept towards the back ... I can't give High Colonies my highest recommendation, but it is certainly worth checking out if you are interested in an unusual SF campaign."

In Issue 40 of Challenge, Julia Martin thought the combat system was "a good middle-of-the-road complexity ... well geared for a game in which the players are likely to want to play soldier-type characters." However Martin pointed out "The combat system does utilize many different modifiers which create a sense of realism, but which also add to the complexity of the system." Martin thought the game had some nice touches including readable text, clear uncluttered charts, and logos or unit badges for organizations. Martin thought the sample adventure "while not spectacular, is solid." Martin concluded "If you are looking for a game system to use to play a gritty, hard science-fiction campaign with, I would recommend High Colonies."

Rick Swan wrote two reviews of High Colonies:

- In the July–August 1989 issue of Space Gamer, Swan felt that the book was a better sourcebook for other science fiction role-playing games, commenting, "As a game, High Colonies doesn't measure up to the competition. As a sourcebook, science-fiction role-players could do a lot worse."
- The following year, in his 1990 book The Complete Guide to Role-Playing Games, Swan called it "A science fiction RPG with a strong premise and shaky mechanics." Swan thought the game systems were "adequate but uninspired ... The convoluted combat system would be more at home in a military simulation than a role-playing game." Swan was particularly puzzled by the damage and healing systems, which did not seem to be related. "Damage affects specific body parts, but healing is determined at random. It's possible, then, that a character who suffered a head wound yesterday will inexplicably heal his arm today." Swan concluded by giving the game a rating of 2.5 out of 4, saying, "High Colonies has a lot of potential — clearly designers Eric Hotz and Edwin King are talented guys — but the rules don't quite measure up to the background."

== Other reviews and commentary ==
- Voyages to the Worlds of SF Gaming (Issue 11 - Apr 1990)
