= Victory: World War II =

1998 game

Victory: World War II is a 1998 board game published by Columbia Games.

== Gameplay ==
Victory: World War II is a game in which blocks representing World War II units are played on a set of four modular maps.

== Reception ==
The online second version of Pyramid reviewed Victory: World War II and commented that "This elegant system provides not only a handsome game, but also a painless way to handle fog of war, hit reduction, and combat results in one easy mechanic."

== Reviews ==
- Backstab #19
- Backstab #36 (as "Victory: 2e Guerre mondiale")
- The Comics Buyer's Guide (as "Victory: The Blocks of War")
