= Dixie (card game) =

1994 American Civil War collectible card game

- Card back (artwork by Eric Hotz)
- Designers: Tom Dalgliesh
- Publishers: Columbia Games
- Players: 2
- Playing time: 30-60 minutes
- Chance: Some
- Age range: 12+

Dixie is a collectible card game (CCG) published by Columbia Games in 1994 that uses dice and dedicated decks of cards to simulate famous American Civil War (ACW) battles.

== Description ==
Dixie is a two-player CCG in which each battle being fought — First Bull Run, Shiloh, or Gettysburg — uses a specific deck, each with cards representing every regiment, artillery battery, and general present at the battle. Cards have drawings depicting the approximate uniforms that each unit wore at the actual battle. Special cards depict key terrain features, generals, and scenario-related special events (such as rallies, ammunition, morale, etc.) Each regiment and artillery card has a Combat Value (CV) from 1 to 4.

During each game, one player plays with a Union deck, and the other uses a Confederate deck.

=== Gameplay ===
A tabletop is divided (invisibly) into Right, Center and Left sections. The Union player sits on one side of the table, facing the Confederate player. The players deal themselves a hand of 18 cards (Union player) or 15 cards (Confederate player). From their hand, players then deploy any terrain cards they have, placing them in the Right, Center and/or Left portions of the tabletop. (Terrain cards cannot be used any time after this.) From their hand, each player then deploys from 1 to 4 cards in the Right, Center and/or Left sections, keeping the remainder of their cards in their hand.

In traditional "I Go, You Go" fashion, the players alternate taking turns. Each player's turn has four phases:

1. Morale: Leaders can attempt to repair CV damage to regiment and artillery cards.
2. Combat: The active player moves one of the cards in one of the sections (Right, Center or Left) forward to engage the enemy card opposite it. The attacking player rolls a number of dice equal to the attacking card's CV. The results of each die are checked against the card's firepower. Each successful hit reduces the defending card's CV by 1. If the card's CV falls to zero, it is removed from the game.
3. Move: The active player plays a card from their hand onto the tabletop.
4. Reinforce: The active player replaces cards removed from their hand with fresh cards from their deck.

=== Victory conditions ===
The first player to eliminate all enemy cards from two of the three sections is the winner.

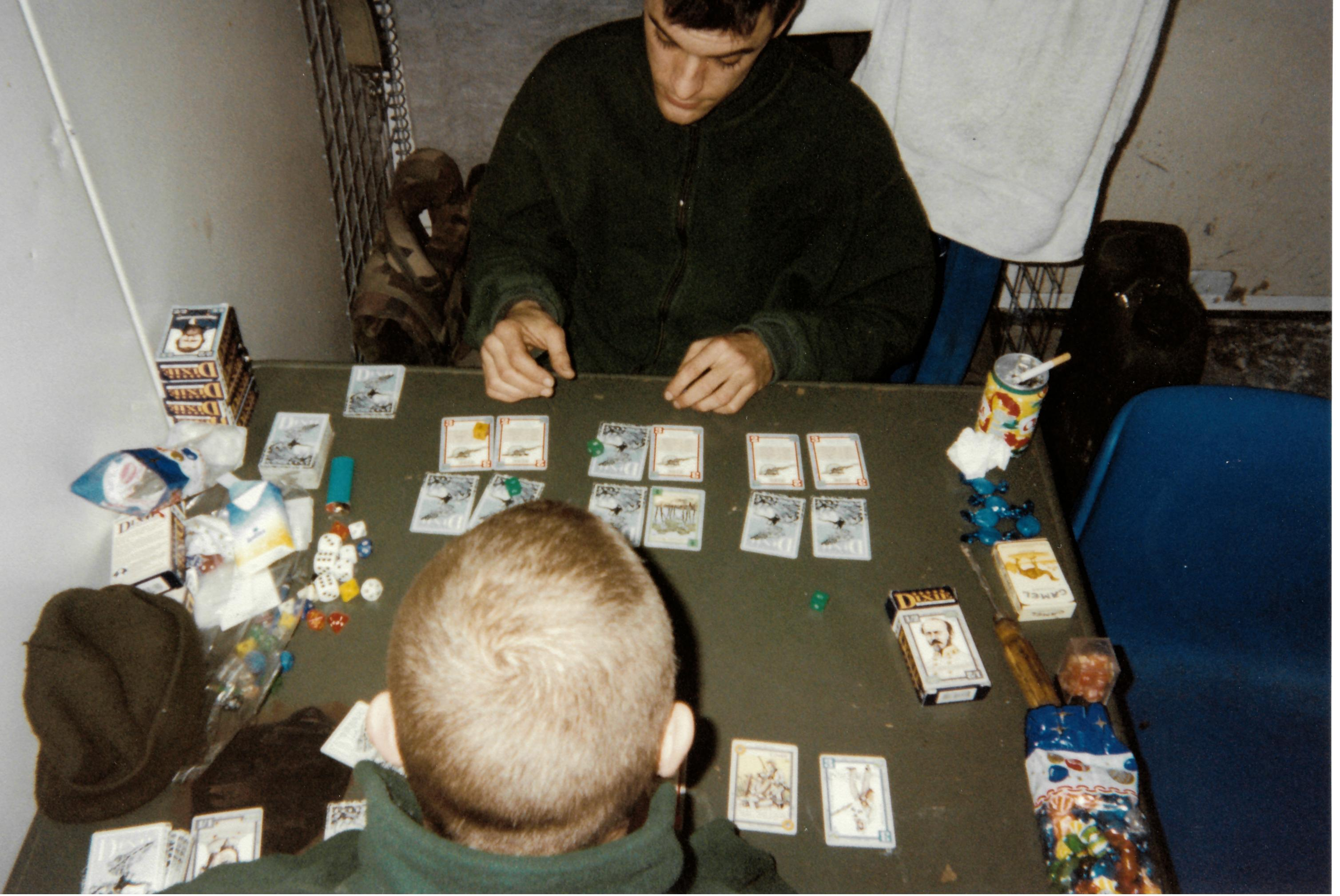
French IFOR soldiers playing Dixie, 1996

== Publication history ==
At the 1992 Origins Awards, game designer and co-founder of Gamma Two Games/Columbia Games Tom Dalgliesh was recognized for his 1972 invention of the block wargame, which used three-dimensional blocks instead of cardboard counters to represent military units.

Two years later, Dalgliesh designed Dixie, a CCG with artwork by Eric Hotz that used rules very similar to his block wargames. The finished game was published by Columbia Games.

Three sets of cards, each based on one ACW battle, were published in 1994:

1. "First Bull Run": The complete set has 200 cards. Each booster pack contains a random assortment of 60 of those cards (30 Union, 30 Confederates).
2. "Shiloh": The second, and largest set issued, with 400 cards.
3. "Gettysburg": This has 250 cards, but unlike the first two sets, the 60-card booster packs are asymmetrical, having 36 Union and 24 Confederate cards. Also, unlike the other two battles, "Gettysburg" features infantry brigades, not regiments, and artillery battalions.

== Reception ==
In Issue 16 of Richard Berg's Review of Games, Richard Berg liked the artwork of Eric Hotz, saying, "What helps Dixie a lot is that it is a very handsome product, from the attractive box to the sturdy cards. Hotz's art, while not exactly going to cause anyone at MOMA to come 'a callin', is evocative and colorful." Berg liked the gameplay, calling it "delightfully simple, although it takes rather longer to play than the 30-60 minutes the box promises." Berg concluded, "While Dixie does not demand tremendous tactical insight, mostly as movement and combat is fairly limited by the three section/line arrangement, there is enough going on that good play can defeat bad play."

In Issue 17.5 of Shadis, Matthew Lee and Jim Pinto discussed the "Bull Run" game. Lee commented "Simple rules and easy to understand gameplay allows players to play within the first half hour of opening the box. The artwork is cleanly drawn for the most part." However, Lee also pointed out, "Dice are used to determine the outcome of battles and morale checks for wounded troops, which leaves players at the mercy of the random dice rolls." Pinto replied, "The Civil War theme is new to the card collecting genre" but noted that with only 200 cards in the "Bull Run" collection, there was not much incentive to purchase more cards. Lee concluded, "Game design suggests a non-collectable card set would have been better. The simple gameplay and few rules involved, along with the small amount of cards available in the set cause the replayability of the game to be low." Pinto concluded, "The Battle of Bull Run is not the most famous, nor the most interesting of the Civil War battles."

In the November 1995 edition of Dragon (issue 223), Rick Swan noted the rules were "simple but ingenious". Swan concluded with a positive recommendation, saying, "Yes it's history, but it's fun history."

In the February 1996 edition of Arcane (Issue 3), Steve Faragher liked the quality of the cards, noting, "The cards themselves are good, sporting reasonable line drawings (with authentic uniforms, natch) on well-laminated thick card. The only problem with them is that once bent, they tend to stay that way." Regarding gameplay, Faragher commented, "It makes for a surprisingly enjoyable recreation of the intense and violent action of the Civil War. From a very simple card layout, some quite intricate tactics can be used." Faragher concluded by giving Dixie an average rating of 7 out of 10, saying, "it's a fun game that offers many an hour of pleasant (if perhaps only mildly exciting) entertainment. The game can be played straight from the starter deck and added to at your leisure, which is a good thing. On the other hand, it doesn't really offer the huge variety of options that a game such as Magic: The Gathering does."
