= Kriegspiel (chess) =

Chess variant rules

Position: d4 white pawn, f4 white bishop, b3 white bishop, c3 white knight, f3 white knight, a2 white pawn, b2 white pawn, f2 white pawn, g2 white pawn, h2 white pawn, a1 white rook, d1 white queen, e1 white rook, g1 white king
A game in progress; position as seen by White
- Years active: Since 1899
- Genres: Board game Chess variant
- Players: 2, plus an umpire
- Setup time: ~1 min
- Playing time: 30–90 min
- Skills: Strategy, tactics, memory
- Synonyms: blind chess Screen Chess; War-Chess; Commando Chess

Kriegspiel is a chess variant invented by Henry Michael Temple in 1899 and based upon the original Kriegsspiel (German for war game) developed by Georg von Reiswitz in 1812. In this game, each player can see their own pieces but not those of their opponent. For this reason, it is necessary to have a third person (or computer) act as an umpire, with full information about the progress of the game. Players attempt to move on their turns, and the umpire declares their attempts 'legal' or 'illegal'. If the move is illegal, the player tries again; if it is legal, that move stands. Each player is given information about checks and captures. They may also ask the umpire if there are any legal captures with a pawn. Since the position of the opponent's pieces is unknown, Kriegspiel is a game of imperfect information.

On the Internet Chess Club, Kriegspiel is called Wild 16.

Kriegspiel is similar to Dark chess.

== Rules ==
There are several different rulesets for Kriegspiel. The rules offered on the Chess Variant Pages are as follows.

The game is played with three boards, one for each player; the third is for the umpire (and spectators). Each opponent knows the exact position of just their own pieces, and does not know where the opponent's pieces are (but can keep track of how many there are). Only the umpire knows the position of the game. The game proceeds in the following way:

The umpire announces:

- "White [or Black] to move".
- "Pawn gone", when a pawn is captured. The square of the capture is announced, e.g. "Pawn gone on d4", or "Pawn captured on d4". (En passant captures are specifically announced as such, e.g. "Black has taken en passant on f3.")
- "Piece gone", when a piece is captured. The square of the capture is announced.
- "No", when the attempted move is illegal, given the opponent's position. For example: moving the king into check; moving a queen, rook, bishop, or pawn through squares occupied by the opponent's pieces; advancing a pawn into a square occupied by the opponent's pieces; moving a piece under an absolute pin.
- "Hell no" (or "Impossible" or "Nonsense"), when the attempted move is always illegal regardless of the opponent's position. For example, moving a bishop as if it were a knight.
- "Check on the vertical".
- "Check on the horizontal".
- "Check on the long diagonal" (the longer of the two diagonals, from the king's point of view).
- "Check on the short diagonal".
- "Check by a knight".
- "Checkmate", "stalemate", "draw by repetition", "draw by insufficient force", "50-move draw".

Pawn promotions are not announced. The precise location of the checking piece is not announced (although it may be deduced).

To avoid wasting time with many illegal pawn capture attempts, players may ask the umpire "Are there any pawn captures?" or just "Any?" If there are no legal pawn captures, the umpire answers "No." Otherwise, the umpire answers "Try!" Asking "Any?" and receiving a positive answer obligates the asking player to then attempt a pawn capture: if this capture is unsuccessful, the asking player may then try any other move, pawn capture or not. En passant pawn tries are announced, but not the fact that they are en passant captures. Asking "Any?" when a player has no pawns left is treated as an illegal move and answered "Hell no" (or "Impossible", "Nonsense").

Illegal move attempts are not announced to the opponent.

== Kriegspiel problems ==
Jacques Rotenberg
The Problemist 1976

Position: f6 white bishop, d3 white knight, a2 white rook, h2 black pawn, f1 white king, h1 black king

Kriegspiel, mate in 8
Black has a dark-square bishop on an unknown square.

Kriegspiel is sometimes used in chess problems. In these, usual variations introduced by different black moves are replaced by variations introduced by different announcements.

An example of a Kriegspiel problem is shown. White must checkmate Black in 8 moves, no matter where the black bishop initially is (it is somewhere on dark squares) and no matter what Black plays. (In a real Kriegspiel game, Black would not see White's moves, but for a problem in which White is to force a win, one must assume the worst-case scenario in which Black guesses correctly on each move.) For example, 1.Ra1?? is a draw by stalemate if the black bishop was initially on a1. 1.Nf2 Bxf2 2.Kxf2 (or Rxf2) is stalemate as well. So, White should not move either the knight or the bishop, because either might capture the black bishop by accident. For the same reason, the white rook should move only to light squares – but only half of the light squares are reachable without visiting a dark square along the way. Additionally, White should avoid placing his pieces on the a7–g1 diagonal prematurely because the invisible black bishop could be guarding that diagonal and capture the white pieces upon entering it, leading to a draw. The same applies to the e1–h4 diagonal.

The solution is the following: White tries to play 1.Rg2.

- If this move is not possible (umpire says No), then the black bishop must be on b2, d2 or f2. In this case White can instead play 1.N(x)f2#.
- If the move is possible, it is made and then Black moves the bishop. White still does not know where the bishop is.

White continues with 2.Rg8.

- If not possible, then black bishop is on g3, g5 or g7. White plays 2.Be5. If Black now plays 2...Bxe5, 3.Nf2#. Otherwise (any move by Black) 3.Nf2+ Bxf2 4.Rxh2#.
- If 2.Rg8 was possible, White continues 3.Rh8. (This is safe – the black bishop cannot be on h8 to be captured, because it was not on g7 on the previous turn.) 4.Rh5 and 5.Rb5.
- If 5.Rb5 was possible, White continues 6.Rb1 7.Nf2+ Bxf2 8.Kxf2#.
- If 5.Rb5 was not possible, then 5.Rh3 (the black bishop must be on c5, e5 or g5 at this moment) 6.Be5 (this is safe because before 6.Be5 the black bishop had to make a move from either c5, e5 or g5, thus cannot be on e5 at this moment) 7.Nf2+ Bxf2 8.Rxh2#.
- If 4.Rh5 or 6.Rb1 (after 5.Rb5) are blocked (umpire says No to these moves), then the black bishop is not guarding f2 at that particular moment so White can immediately play Nf2# instead.

== Rule variations ==
- Edward Nathan Frankenstein suggested in 1903 a variation of the game where one player sees the board and another plays Kriegspiel. To make the game fair, the "sighted" player starts with fewer pieces. Frankenstein proposed two variants:
  - Pickle pot: The player who sees the board plays with king, queen, one bishop, and pawns; a total of 11 pieces.
  - One-eye: The player who sees the board plays with king, two rooks, one bishop, and pawns; a total of 12 pieces.

In both versions, it should be announced which bishop is used (on c-file or f-file).

- Semi-kriegspiel: The game is similar to these variations. The "sighted" side has only king and queen, which can be placed on any legal square before the beginning of the game. Suggested by David Silverman (1971).
- Modern kriegspiel: After each move, the player calls seven squares, which must be opened by umpire. Otherwise the rules are as in usual kriegspiel. By Bruce Trone (1986).
- Combining Crazyhouse with Kriegspiel yields Crazyhouse Kriegspiel (or CrazyKrieg for short).
- In shogi, the game analogous to kriegspiel is called tsuitate shogi (Japanese: 衝立将棋).
- Kriegspiel at the RAND Corporation Years ago, a version of kriegspiel-chess was avidly played among staff members of RAND Corporation. Two separate boards were fully set-up having a partition between which prevented each player from seeing his opponent's board. An umpire sat astride the partition and only announced illegal moves, captures and checks. To expedite play, an umpire could also announce pawn-tries and each player's very first move.

== See also ==
- Dark chess
- Fog of war
