= Napoleon (board game) =

1974 Napoleonic board wargame

Box cover of original Gamma Two edition, 1974

Napoleon, subtitled "The Waterloo Campaign, 1815", is a strategic-level block wargame published by Gamma Two Games in 1974 that simulates the Battle of Waterloo. A number of versions of the game have been produced by Avalon Hill and Columbia Games.

== Description ==
Instead of cardboard counters, military units are represented by square blocks. The blocks are marked on one side by the unit designation; at the start of the game, these face away from the opposing player so that their exact designation is unknown, simulating the "fog of war."

With three armies in play (French, British & allies, and Prussian) the game can be played by either two or three players. The main board shows the area of the battle. When units come into contact, the combat is moved to a smaller board for resolution.

=== Components ===
The number of blocks has varied from edition to edition:

- 1st & 2nd editions: 48 blocks
- 3rd edition: 84 blocks plus separate blocks for Blücher, Napoleon and Wellington
- 4th edition: 56 blocks

The game also has two mapboards and a rule book.

=== Gameplay ===
The game uses an alternating system of turns where the French move and fire, representing the morning of the battle; followed by a British and Prussian turn, representing mid-day; and the French have the third turn, representing the evening.

=== Movement ===
The map does not have a traditional hex grid but instead uses areas and towns connected by a network of roads. Movement along major roads is faster than on minor roads or across bridges. Units must be concentrated into groups, and each player can only move two groups per turn.

=== Combat ===
All units start with their block turned so that their highest combat value (CV) is at 12 o'clock. The French player forms their blocks into three columns, and then the British/Prussian player does the same. Both players then lay down their blocks so that the units and current CVs are revealed. Each column will fight the column in line with it. The combat sequence is:

- Defender retreat (optional)
- Defender may add one unit from reserve to any column
- Defender fires: The player adds up the CVs of all the units in the column, and rolls a number of dice equal to the sum of the CVs. For each 6 rolled, all the units in the opposing column reduce their CV by 1 (rotating the block so that the new reduced CV is now at 12 o'clock.) If any unit reaches a CV of 0, it is eliminated.

The Attacker then goes through these same phases. This sequence of play is repeated until one army is eliminated, or one player decides to retreat. If a player retreats, the non-retreating army's reserve units triple their CV and fire one final volley.

Gamma Two's second 1974 version with cover art based on painting Napoleon Crossing the Alps by Jacques-Louis David. Avalon Hill used this cover art as well for 1977 edition

== Publication history ==
In 1972, Tom Dalgliesh co-founded Gamma Two Games and designed the first block wargame, Quebec 1759. That game was a success, and Dalgliesh designed War of 1812 in 1973, and Napoleon: The Waterloo Campaign, 1815 in 1974.

These three games were the first block wargames, where units are represented by wooden or plastic blocks rather than the more traditional miniature soldiers or die-cut cardboard counters.

Gamma Two immediately re-issued the game later in 1974 that used cover art based on the famous painting Napoleon Crossing the Alps by Jacques-Louis David.

Gamma Two sold the rights to Napoleon to Avalon Hill, which produced a second edition of the game in 1977 using the same cover art.

After Avalon Hill's demise, Gamma Two Games — by then Columbia Games — took back the license and produced a third edition in 1994 and a fourth edition in 2013.

== Reception ==
In Issue 32 of the British wargaming magazine Perfidious Albion, Charles Vasey commented, "This is a very nice game, which while not lacking in chrome, achieves considerable elegance in the way the simple mechanics generate splendidly painful interactions and dilemmas." Vasey called the system of staggered reinforcement of battles by nearby troops "ingenious", and also noted that allowing the French player to send forces all over the board (as opposed to only coming up the main road from Paris) "offers the French player wide choices." Vasey did see a few issues with the game, especially the arbitrary movement restriction of groups of units per turn, which he felt was "unrealistic and might kill interest a after a large number of games." Vasey also noted the lack of effect that terrain had on the battle, pointing out that this removed historicity from the game.

In the 1980 book The Complete Book of Wargames, game designer Jon Freeman commented "Napoleon is a fresh experience for the land-combat enthusiast. Although it doesn't resemble a simulation very much, it is a challenging game that can be fun to play." He noted that luck plays a part in the game, saying, "The vagaries of the dice produce scrambling, tension filled battles in which a decisive defeat can be turned into victory in an amazingly short time." Freeman gave this game an Overall Evaluation of "Good to Very Good", concluding, "The real emphasis is on concentrating sufficient force to overcome any freak occurrence. It's a refreshing break from the rigors and eyestrain of more conventional treatments."

In Issue 24 of Fire & Movement, Bill Haggart conceded that "If this [game] sounds like Risk more than simulation gaming, that is correct in many ways; Napoleon is that simple. Nevertheless, Napoleon does simulate certain aspects pof Napoleonic warfare better than any other game." Haggart concluded, "The game system forces the players to think in terms of 'space-time,' that is, envisage a series of marches culminating in a battle at a point where the enemy can neither win nor afford to retreat."

In Issue 13 of Paper Wars, Jonathan Price noted, "Unlike other wargames, Napoleon rarely plays alike twice. With the ability to establish one's own initial deployment and the myriad of moves available from this, each game plays fresh almost every time."

In Issue 52 of Moves, Ian Chadwick wrote, "It is good for a few quick games, and the outcome is hard to predict since the dice play such a large part in combat. It is a lot of fun to play every now and then, though continuous play becomes tedious and you ache for more substance." Chadwick gave the game an "A" for playability, a "C-" for historical accuracy and a "B" for component quality, concluding, "This is the best of the three similar games produced by Gamma Two and the most balanced of the lot. It is a good way to break reluctant friends into the hobby."

== Other reviews and commentary ==
- Panzerfaust #64
- Panzerfaust & Campaign #71 and #72
- The Canadian Wargaming Journal, Issue 37 (Fall 1993)
- The Wargamer Vol. 2, Issue 19 (July 2003 - review of Gamma Two Games' 1st edition)
- The Wargamer Vol. 2, Issue 29 (Winter 2009 - review of Columbia Games' 3rd edition)
- Casus Belli #76
