= Hammer of the Scots (board game) =

2002 board game

- Designers: Jerry Taylor and Tom Dalgliesh
- Publishers: Columbia Games
- Players: 2
- Setup time: 2 minutes
- Playing time: 120-240 minutes
- Chance: Medium
- Age range: 10 and up
- Skills: Strategic thought

Hammer of the Scots is a board game designed in 2002 by Jerry Taylor and Tom Dalgliesh and published by Columbia Games. It chronicles the Wars of Scottish Independence through roughly the time period portrayed in the film Braveheart.

== Description ==
Hammer of the Scots is a block wargame. The units are represented by wooden blocks with identifying markings on only one side. These blocks are stood up so that only the controlling player can see the identifiers, with the opposing player only seeing a blank back. This helps simulate the "fog of war".

== Publication history ==
Hammer of the Scots was designed by Jerry Taylor and Tom Dalgliesh and published by Columbia Games in 2002.

== Reception ==
Hammer of the Scots won the 2003 International Gamers Award. It was a nominee for the 2002 Charles S. Roberts Awards for Best Pre-World War II Boardgame. Gav Thorpe comments: "Hammer has simple rules and therefore its strength lies in the complex strategies and tactics that arise from these basic foundations." The Wargamer wrote: "Hammer of the Scots is an elegant example on how games need not be complex to be historically accurate and still fun to play."
