= Dark chess =

Chess variant

Position: a8 black cross, b8 black cross, c8 black cross, d8 black cross, e8 black cross, f8 black cross, h8 black cross, a7 black cross, b7 black cross, c7 black knight, d7 black cross, e7 black cross, f7 black cross, h7 black cross, a6 black cross, b6 black cross, d6 black pawn, f6 black pawn, a5 black cross, b5 black cross, f5 white pawn, h5 black cross, a4 black pawn, b4 black pawn, d4 white pawn, e4 white knight, f4 white bishop, d3 black cross, f3 black cross, h3 white pawn, a2 white pawn, b2 white pawn, h2 white queen, a1 white king, c1 white rook, g1 white rook

A game of Dark chess in progress from the point of view of White. The crosses indicate squares that cannot be seen. White can see which pieces are on a4 and b4 because White's pawns would normally be able to move there. (In some versions of Dark chess, a4 and b4 would be dark, since pawns do not move the same way they capture; but White would be able to infer that there are unknown enemy pieces there because otherwise White's pawns would be able to move there.)

Dark chess (also known as Fog of War chess) is a chess variant with incomplete information, similar to Kriegspiel. It was invented by Jens Bæk Nielsen and Torben Osted in 1989. A player does not see the entire board – only their own pieces and the squares that they can legally move to.

== Rules ==
The goal of this chess variant is not to checkmate the king, but to capture it. A player is not told if their king is in check. Failing to move out of check, or moving into check, are both legal, and can obviously result in a capture and loss of the game.

Each player views a different version of the board, on which they can only see their own pieces, and the squares where these pieces can legally move, as well as any opponent pieces on those squares (which must therefore be capturable). It is indicated to the player which squares are hidden, so a hidden square can never be confused with a visible empty square. As an example, it is always clear when an enemy piece is directly in front of a pawn, because that square will be hidden (as capturing it is not a legal move for the pawn to make).

En passant capture is allowed; the threatened pawn and the square it moved through are both visible to the capturing player, but only until the end of the turn. Unlike standard chess, castling is allowed out of check, into check, and through the positions attacked by enemy pieces.

This chess variant is best played on online chess servers. In September 2020, Dark chess was the most popular variant on Chess.com. For playing over-the-board, three chess sets and a referee are needed, just as in Kriegspiel.

There are some minor differences in the rules on different servers:

- SchemingMind: the player does not see what is in front of their pawns, but knows if the position is occupied or not.
- Chess.com (known as "Fog of War chess"); the player does not see what is in front of their pawns, but knows if the position is occupied or not; pawn promotions remain unknown for the opponent. Before November 5, 2021 when a pawn could be taken en passant, the pawn was not visible, but the en passant square was lit up.

== Variations ==
Generally, because basic Dark chess rules are universal with respect to its "parent" classical variant, any 2-player chess variant may be played "in dark". SchemingMind provides some of the variations.

- Dark chess (checkmate) – standard rules of check apply (a player is notified when its king is in check, and the king cannot move into check). The goal in this variation is the same as in standard chess — to checkmate the king.
- Dark chess (check) – a player is notified when the king is in check, but the king can remain in check after a move. The goal in this variation is the same as in standard dark chess – to capture the king.
- Dark crazyhouse – combination of crazyhouse and dark chess.
- Dark suicide – combination of suicide and dark chess.
- Sun Tzu chess – combination of Double Fischer Random Chess (like Chess960, but with different positions for White and Black), crazyhouse and dark chess. Pieces can be dropped onto any possible square on the board (like crazyhouse). This chess variant was invented in 2005 by John Kipling Lewis.
- Lao Tzu chess – like Sun Tzu, but pieces can only be dropped on seen squares. Also invented in 2005 by John Kipling Lewis.
- Dark Omega chess – combination of Omega Chess and dark chess.
- Dark Seirawan chess – combination of Seirawan chess and dark chess.

== Gameplay ==
Dark chess has a strong strategic flavor. Planning and strategy, as well as some psychological reasoning, are very important; tactics and move searching are not as important as in standard chess.

In this variant, a king should be carefully protected from very dangerous checks by invisible pieces; castling is essential, as the pawns and rook protect the king from invisible pieces. For a queen the most dangerous pieces are knights, which can attack it without becoming visible.

== Computer play ==
Fog of War chess is a game of imperfect information. Chess engines built for standard chess assume complete knowledge of the board, so they do not apply directly. Beyond the calculation used in standard chess, strong play also requires reasoning about information gathering, the opponent's knowledge, and signaling.

In 2025, Brian Hu Zhang and Tuomas Sandholm presented Obscuro, which they describe as the first program to reach superhuman strength at Fog of War chess. It pairs the Stockfish evaluation function with new search techniques for imperfect-information games and runs by real-time search on consumer hardware. In a 20-game match against the top-rated player on the chess.com Fog of War leaderboard (rated 2318), whom the authors identify as the strongest human player, Obscuro won 16 games and lost 4. It had also won 834 of 1,000 games against the authors' own earlier program, until then the strongest for the variant.

== See also ==
- Fog of war
- List of chess variants
