= Monster Derby =

Monster Derby is a 1994 board game published by Gamesmiths.

== Gameplay ==
Monster Derby is a game in which fantasy monsters race across a modular terrain course, with unpredictable gameplay and a humorous premise. Instead of controlling a single monster, players secretly predict the finishing order of all monsters before the race begins. Throughout the game, they take turns moving different monsters, creating strategic tension as they try to influence outcomes without revealing their predictions. The game's mechanics are simple and intuitive. Movement is balanced—each monster must be moved once before any can be moved again—so players often find themselves advancing monsters they would rather hold back. The game is replayable due to its varied terrain and the shifting dynamics of monster movement. The game includes a wide variety of monsters.

== Publication history ==
Monster Derby was designed by Jeff Siadek and published by Gamesmiths.

== Reception ==
Pyramid magazine reviewed Monster Derby for and stated that "Monster Derby is one of those rare games that creates laughter every time it's played. Not just most of the time, but every time. This is partly because the game is so different each time, partly because the rules are so easy as to become invisible, but mostly because the setting is just plain silly and fun."

== Reviews ==
- Ludism: Board Games That Will Get You High
- Spieletest
