= Jerry Taylor =

American public policy activist (born 1963)

- Born: Jerome Cogburn Taylor; August 2, 1963 (age 62)

Jerome Cogburn Taylor (born August 2, 1963) is an American environmental activist, policy analyst, and game designer. Taylor cofounded the Niskanen Center, a Washington, D.C.–based think tank that, among other things, advocates for market environmentalism and the adoption of a carbon tax system to combat global warming.

== Early life and education ==
Taylor attended the University of Iowa as a political science major. As a student, Taylor became an editor of the Hawkeye Review, a conservative student newspaper that served as an alternative to the Daily Iowan, and founded "Students for Traditional American Freedoms", a conservative activist group.

== Career ==
Before founding the Niskanen Center in 2014, Taylor was a senior fellow at the Cato Institute, where he previously espoused a skeptical position on environmental issues. Taylor's case is a prominent example of a former climate-change denier who came to embrace policies to address climate change after researching the scientific consensus behind man-made global warming. During the 1990s and 2000s Taylor made regular media appearances as a global warming denier, including on Penn and Teller's show Bullshit as well as a special edition of the John Stossel show devoted to attacking climate science. After being challenged by Joe Romm to fact-check sources, Taylor changed his prior beliefs because "the scientific evidence became stronger and stronger over time."

On September 6, 2021, Taylor resigned from the Niskanen Institute. He had been placed on administrative leave by the Institute a few days earlier after the board became aware of him being charged with domestic violence against his wife. The charges were subsequently dismissed.

He is also a board game designer who has released three wargames, Hammer of the Scots, Crusader Rex, and Richard III.

== Personal life ==
Taylor's brother, James Taylor, is president at the Heartland Institute which opposes addressing climate change.

== See also ==
- The Power of Big Oil
