= War of 1812 (board game) =

1973 board game

1st edition cover, 1973

War of 1812, subtitled in the first edition "La Guerre de 1812", is a board wargame published in 1973 by Gamma Two Games, (now Columbia Games), that simulates the War of 1812.

== Description ==
War of 1812 is a two-player game in which one player controls the British, Canadian and Tecumseh's confederacy forces in British North America, and the other player controls the American forces. Like its predecessor, Quebec 1759, this game uses wooden blocks set on edge, with unit information and current strength facing towards the owning player and hidden from the opposing player. The game is divided into three years (1812 to 1814), with ten turns per year.

=== Components ===
- mounted map of Northeast North America
- 40 wooden block counters
- rulebook
- six-sided dice

=== Setup ===
The British player draws ten land units at random, the American player draws 12. Units must be deployed to cover every friendly town and city worth two or more victory points. Each player also receives three naval units. If the British player captures Detroit, the player receives a block counter representing a strong unit of Shawnee.

=== Movement ===
Rather than a hex grid, the map simply features routes between towns and cities. Units can move along one route per turn. Naval units are needed to transport land units across the Great Lakes.

=== Combat ===
When units engage in combat, each player adds up the number of strength points involved and rolls that many dice. Each six that is rolled reduces the enemy strength by one point. Following each roll, both players have the option to retire from combat or continue. When an enemy town is captured, it must be garrisoned by at least one unit.

=== Victory conditions ===
Victory points are gained by taking and garrisoning enemy towns, each of which has a stated victory point value. If one player builds a ten-point advantage, the game is immediately over. Otherwise, the game lasts 30 turns (3 years), and the victor is the player with the most victory points.

== Publication history ==
In 1973, shortly after graduating from university in Vancouver, Canada, Tom Dalgliesh formed Gamma Two Games with Steve Brewster and Lance Gutteridge, and the three designed their first "block game", Quebec 1759. When it became apparent that the company would need more capital in order to publish the game, Brewster left. The following year, Dalgliesh and Gutteridge designed and published War of 1812.

The market for board wargames was limited, and in 1974 Gamma Two switched to more lucrative family board games. However, War of 1812 still remains in print to the present day, even following Gamma Two's name change to Columbia Games and a move to the United States.

== Reception ==
In Issue 3 of Games International, Mike Siggins thought this was a game "that will appeal as a basic game for a beginner or as a quick, light hearted time-filler for the more hardened boardgamer." He found the components "appealing", and the rules were "extremely clear." He concluded by giving the game an above average rating of 4 stars out of 5, saying, "This is a fine game offering excellent value for money and if the [soon to be published] EastFront successor is as good or better it will be very interesting indeed."

Game designer Gilbert Collins thought War of 1812 was "a great game", but "didn't have enough historical flavor [...] Where was General Brock, the great Indian leader Tecumseh, the Battle of Lake Erie, the Rocket's Red Glare, the Battle of Lundy's Lane?" Despite this, Collins wrote, "It’s a tribute to its designer that it is still in print thirty-nine years later."

== Reviews ==
- Graustark #296

== Other recognition ==
A copy of War of 1812 is held in the collection of the University of Toronto Library (item 971.034 W2532).
