= Block wargame =

Tabletop game genre

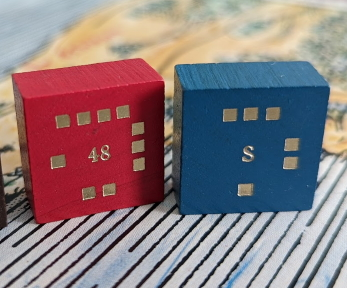
Two embossed wooden blocks from the first block wargame, Quebec 1759 (1972). Combat strength step reductions are displayed around the perimeters

A block wargame is a board wargame that represents military units using wooden blocks instead of cardboard counters or metal/plastic miniatures.

== Description ==
A block wargame uses wooden blocks to represent units. These blocks are typically square, have a labeled and an unlabeled side, and are generally thick enough that they can be placed on their side with the labeled side facing the owning player. Details about the unit (for instance, its identity as well as its attack, defense and movement scores) can then be seen easily by the owning player, while the opposing player will be left unsure of the exact nature of piece; while he can see where his rival's forces are, the fog of war is emulated by preserving the secrecy of the type and quality of the troops.

Often, block pieces display the main information in the center with a series of numbers (or pips) around the edge, so that the current strength of the unit can be shown in a "step-reduction" system (where a unit's strength is reduced step-by-step, as it takes damage during combat.) When the unit is undamaged, the largest number will be displayed at 12 o'clock. When the unit is damaged, the player turns it counterclockwise so that the next largest number is at 12 o'clock, with the number of pips at the top of block indicating its current strength. This continues until the unit's strength reaches zero, whereupon it is removed from play.

Alternatively, some block wargames require the player to remove the block representing the damaged unit from the board and replace it with a block with a lower strength.

== History ==
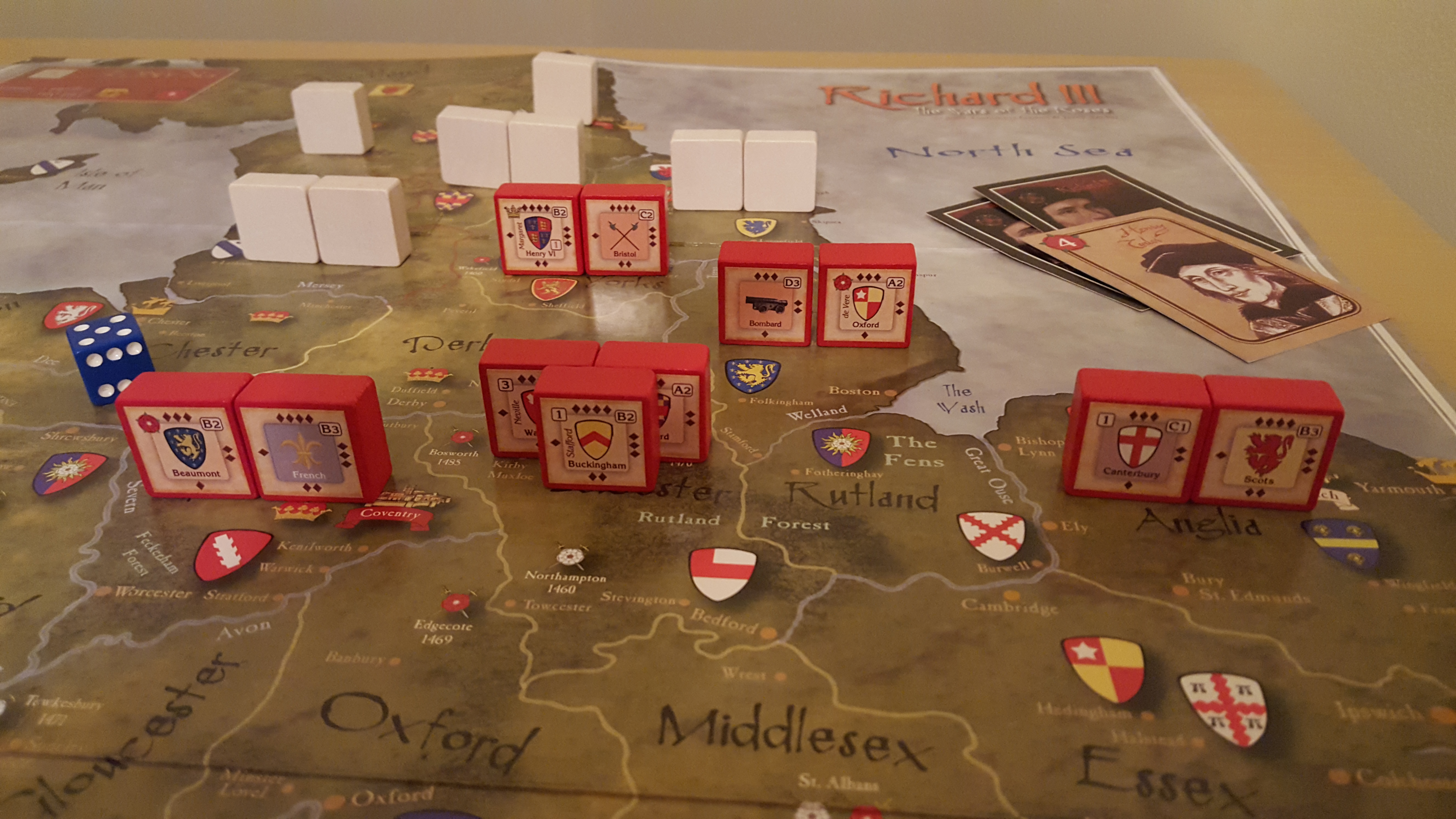
Columbia Games' Richard III demonstrating the fog of war element in play.

The initial idea of pieces that are visible to only one of two players traces back to the 1908 introduction of the game L'Attaque, the first version of Stratego. Early Stratego pieces were cardboard but were replaced by wood after World War II. (Today Stratego pieces are plastic.) However Stratego was not a direct inspiration for block wargames.

In 1972, Lance Gutteridge of Gamma Two Games originally planned on using six-sided dice to represent pieces and to provide for step reduction in combat strength. The high cost of dice led him to decide to instead use embossed wooden blocks showing 2, 3 or 4 steps in combat strength. The first such block wargame was Quebec 1759, depicting the campaign surrounding the Battle of the Plains of Abraham. Gamma Two Games later produced the block wargames War of 1812, simulating the war of that name, and Napoleon, simulating the campaign leading up to the Battle of Waterloo. In 1982, Gamma Two changed its name to Columbia Games.

Through the 1980s and 1990s Columbia Games was practically the sole publisher of block wargames. Their releases during this time included Rommel in the Desert, covering World War II's North Africa campaign; EastFront and its sequels, covering the European theater of World War II at the corps level; and Bobby Lee and Sam Grant, covering the Western theater of the American Civil War. The only significant change was to replace the relatively expensive embossed wooden blocks used in the old Gamma Two Games with plain plastic blocks. Each game then comes with a sheet of stickers to be affixed to the blocks.

== Today ==
Block wargames are enjoying a minor resurgence. Columbia Games' Hammer of the Scots by designer Jerry Taylor has been well received. His next title, Crusader Rex also fared well by many. Jerry Taylor recently released another block game based on the War of the Roses. GMT Games entered the block wargame market in 2003 with the release of Europe Engulfed, a simulation of the entire ETO. A sister game, Asia Engulfed, was released in 2007, using blocks to represent fleets as well as ground forces.

GMT also released a block wargame series called Commands and Colors: Ancients which met with wide approval. Note that this series of games does not fall under the tradition definition of "block wargame" as the units have identifying marks on both sides of the blocks, eliminating the fog of war aspect of most Block Wargames. Simmons Games has published the innovative Bonaparte at Marengo, which was nominated for a 2005 award for Best Historical Simulation by Games Magazine; the game features unique long blocks, reminiscent of the symbols used on battle maps.

Since 2011, VentoNuovo Games has modernized the block wargames sector with the use of new logical algorithms and the creation of ultra-detailed topographic maps. With 14 published titles, it is today the most active company in the sector.

== Reception ==
In the inaugural issue of Command, Bill Stone called the idea of using blocks "not a bad idea, but too clumsy for use in games with high piece density."
