= Quebec 1759 (block wargame) =

Board wargame published in 1972

Cover of 1st edition, 1972

Quebec 1759 is a board wargame published in 1972 by Gamma Two Games (now Columbia Games) that simulates the Battle of the Plains of Abraham outside the walls of Quebec in 1759. The game uses wooden blocks set on their edge rather than the more traditional cardboard counters, unique for a wargame in 1972.

== Background ==
In 1759, as part of the French and Indian War, British general James Wolfe, using British soldiers and elements of the Royal Navy, attempted to conquer the citadel of Quebec, which was defended by French forces under the command of General Louis-Joseph de Montcalm. The Battle of the Plains of Abraham was decisive, but resulted in the deaths of both generals.

Embossed wooden blocks used in 1972 edition: Royal Navy, British unit, French unit. The latter two show Combat Value step reductions around perimeter

== Description ==
La Grande Armée is a two-player game in which one player plays General Wolfe and his British forces, while the other player plays General Montcalm and his French forces. Instead of cardboard counters, the units are represented by small wooden blocks that stand on their side with the unit information facing away from the opposing player. Thus the opponent does not know what the unit or its strength is until it is engaged in combat.

=== Components ===
Rather than using the cardboard counters normally associated with board wargames of the time, Quebec 1759 used 50 wooden blocks, becoming the first of the "Block Wargame" genre. The game includes:

- 32" x 11" mounted map of the St. Lawrence River near Quebec City, divided into ten land zones connected by roads and two river zones
- 25 red and 25 blue embossed wooden blocks (In later editions, these have been replaced by plastic blocks and stickers)
- rules booklet
- historical commentary booklet
- player charts and aids
- four six-sided dice

=== Gameplay ===
The British set up all their land units on the Ile d'Orleans, and all their ships in the Bason. The French player may deploy any number of units in any of the other land zones.

=== Movement ===
Each player can shift as many blocks as desired from one area to an adjacent area. The British player can cross water via ships, one army unit per ship. Each turn, both players write down their moves and then reveal them simultaneously. If opposing units end up in the same zone, combat results.

==== Combat ====
All units start with their block turned so that their highest combat value (CV) is at 12 o'clock. The French player forms their blocks into three columns, and then the British player does the same. Both players then lay down their blocks so that the units and current CVs are revealed. Each column will fight the column in line with it. The combat sequence is:

- Defender retreat (optional)
- Defender may add one unit from reserve to any column
- Defender fires: The player adds up the CVs of all the units in the column, and rolls a number of dice equal to the sum of the CVs. For each 6 rolled, all the units in the opposing column reduce their CV by 1 (rotating the block so that the new reduced CV is now at 12 o'clock.) If any unit reaches a CV of 0, it is eliminated.

The Attacker then goes through these same phases. This sequence of play is repeated until one army is eliminated, or one player decides to retreat. If a player retreats, the non-retreating army's reserve units triple their CV and fire one final volley.

If units have just disembarked from a ship, the opposing army doubles their CV for the first round of play.

=== Victory conditions ===
The game always lasts 16 turns. At the end of the 16th turn, the British win if they are in possession of the Heights of Abraham zone AND have 20 CV anywhere on the board. The French win if the British CV total falls below 20 anytime during the game, or if the British are not in possession of the Abraham zone at the end of Turn 16.

== Publication history ==
In 1972, after Scottish immigrant Tom Dalgliesh graduated from Simon Fraser University in Vancouver, Canada, he and two friends he had met in the university chess club, Lance Gutteridge and Steve Brewster, started up Gamma Two Games and published Quebec 1759. The game would eventually sell 20,000 copies, mainly through department store sales. In 1983 Gamma Two changed its name to Columbia Games and moved across the border to Blaine, Washington, where it continued to sell Quebec 1759, updating the box cover several times, most lately in 2025, but leaving the rules unchanged. Fifty years after Quebec 1759's original publication, Columbia continues to sell the game, although the embossed wooden blocks have been replaced by blank plastic blocks, with unit stickers included in the game box to be applied to the blocks by the players.

== Reception ==
In Issue 22 of the UK magazine Games & Puzzles, John Humphries thought that this game "is simple to play and has a fine balance between luck and skill and can be great fun." He also noted, "Although simple to play, interesting strategy and tactics can be employed. However, the best laid plans can be foiled by ill fortune with the dice." Humphries concluded by giving the game an above-average rating of 5 out of 6, saying that this game "should appeal to non-wargamers as a gentle introduction to the art or science, and to ardent war-gamers as light relief." Two years later, Games & Puzzles called Quebec 1759 "A fairly simple campaign war game but very much in the tradition of the more complex serious war games for which it might well whet a recipient's appetite." The review also complimented the production values, calling it "a beautifully produced game", and concluding "It makes up in playability what it loses in realism or complexity." Two issues later, Terry Donnelly noted that "the very simplicity of it enables one to focus on the strategic and historical aspects without wasting mental energy on the framework of the game." Donnelly also appreciated the brevity of the game, pointing out that, "it can be played in less than an hour and thus is considerably more versatile in company. Its simplicity and visual appeal also make it possible to find opponents among people who would never submit to a game of Anzio or PanzerBlitz." Donnelly concluded with a positive recommendation, saying, "The game has a very nice balance of strategy and tactics, of skill and chance, and of realism and fun."

Games included Quebec 1759 in their "Top 100 Games" three times:

- In 1980, the editors wrote, "Generals Montcalm and Wolfe meet to decide the fate of North America in this fast-moving military strategy game. Players move handsome wooden pieces in large groups around the St. Lawrence area, resolving combat with a simple system. It can be played several times in an evening."
- In 1985, the editors commented "Even nonwargamers will enjoy this simple but intriguing reenactment of the fateful encounter between Montcalm and Wolfe."
- In 1986, the editors noted that "In this fast, unusual-looking wargame, you can re-enact the Battle of Quebec without having to learn any difficult rules."

In the 1977 book The Comprehensive Guide to Board Wargaming, Nicholas Palmer noted this game was "drastically different from usual designs," and he admired the "long, attractive map." He concluded, "Makes an interesting change, but out of the mainstream of board wargames."

Writing for Yorkton This Week, Calvin Daniels complimented the "beautiful map reflective of the period". He liked the block game system, since it "adds depth to a game such as Quebec 1759 without a lot of bookkeeping, keeping game time manageable." He concluded, "When you add factors such as component quality, the excellent block mechanic, and relatively short game time (about an hour), and then add in its Canadian connection, Quebec 1759 is a great addition to a gaming shelf. The ability to try and change the outcome of the famous battle is just too much fun to pass up."

In the inaugural issue of Command, Bill Stone called the idea of using blocks "not a bad idea, but too clumsy for use in games with high piece density."

In A Player's Guide to Table Games, John Jackson commented that this game "demonstrates that a game can be strategic without sacrificing tactics, that it can be deep without being complicated, and that it can recapture with considerable accuracy the flavor of a real battle without recourse to thirty pages of rules." Jackson concluded, "Easy to learn, challenging, not too long (an hour or less), fun — what more could you ask?"

In the 1980 book The Complete Book of Wargames, game designer Jon Freeman commented, "This is an exciting game with little insight into history other than seeing approximately what happened. The system really works well here (arguably better than the sibling games 1812 and Napoleon), and play is fast and furious." Freeman gave this game an Overall Evaluation of "Very Good", concluding, "There's considerable bluff and bravado and a generally good time for all."

== Other reviews and commentary ==
- Panzerfaust #59
- Casus Belli #45 (June 1988)
