= Tom Dalgliesh =

American game designer

- Occupation: Game designer

Tom Dalgliesh is the owner of Columbia Games and a designer of many wargames and fantasy role-playing materials.

== Biography ==
Dalgliesh began his career in games by playing poker while working as a midshipman serving in the British Merchant Navy, before he emigrated to Canada in 1967.

Dalgliesh, Steve Brewster, and Lance Gutteridge formed the game company Gamma Two Games in 1972, which became Columbia Games in 1982. Brewster left in the mid-1970s and Gutteridge left in the mid-1980s, leaving the company entirely to Dalgliesh. Dalgliesh designed Quebec 1759, War of 1812, Napoleon, Slapshot, Klondike, Smoker's Wild, Bobby Lee, Sam Grant, Dixie, Eagles, Victory, Pacific Victory, and Liberty. Dalgliesh co-designed Wizard Kings with his son Grant Dalgliesh, EastFront with Craig Besinque, Hammer of the Scots, Crusader Rex, and Richard III with Jerry Taylor, and Sam Grant, and Shenandoah with Gary Selkirk.

Dalgliesh also entered into a partnership with N. Robin Crossby to publish a fantasy game called Hârn. Dalgliesh followed what he called a "Rolls Royce [sic] business strategy" for Columbia (with the intention to produce "quality product with limited appeal but loyal following"), and had to defend the reputation of Columbia repeatedly over the higher price of the Hârn books. Dalgliesh's work on the Hârn system includes the sourcebooks Kanday (1986), Kaldor (1986), Azadmere (1986), Melderyn (1987), and Pilots' Almanac (1988). Dalgliesh's company Columbia Games published the original work in 1983, and it has remained continuously in print by that company since then. After a disagreement, this partnership ended and Crossby continued to develop the game without the input of Delgliesh or Columbia Games.

Dalgliesh chose to move Columbia Games from Canada to Washington state in 1994; Crossby chose not to move with the company to the United States and afterward ceased production of material to be published by Columbia.

Dalgliesh's War of 1812 in Strategy & Tactics magazine from Decision Games won the 2001 Charles S. Roberts Award for Best Magazine Game. His Hammer of the Scots board game won in the category of best historical simulation in the 2004 Games 100 "Top 100 Games of the Year" contest. He was chosen by vote as a "famous game designer" to be featured as the king of clubs in Flying Buffalo's 2014 Famous Game Designers Playing Card Deck.

== Personal life ==
Dalgliesh now lives in the state of Washington, just south of the Canada-US border, and sails as a hobby.
