= EastFront =

1991 board game

1st edition cover art by Eric Hotz

EastFront: The War in Russia: 1941–45 is a board wargame published by Columbia Games in 1991 that is simulation of the conflict between Germany and the Soviet Union during World War II.

== Background ==
In September 1941, German forces launched a surprise attack against the Soviet Union (Operation Barbarossa) and made large inroads into Soviet territory. The offensive eventually bogged down as Soviet defenses stiffened. In the fall of 1943, Soviet forces counterattacked along a broad front, and German forces began a long retreat back to Germany.

== Description ==
EastFront is a two-player wargame that uses wooden blocks instead of the traditional die-cut cardboard counters used in other wargames. Because the wooden blocks can be set on their edge with identifying information facing away from the opposing player, opponents have limited knowledge about the forces that they are about to engage. The unit's current strength rating is displayed on the unit's face at the 12 o'clock position of the block, with step reductions at 3 o'clock, 6 o'clock, and 9 o'clock.

=== Components ===
The game box contains:

- 22" x 34" cardstock hex grid map
- 120 wooden blocks (military units) and 60 cardboard markers
- 44-page rule book
- four 6-sided dice

=== Scenarios ===
The game comes with eight scenarios, each covering approximately six months, beginning with Operation Barbarossa in Fall 1941, and ending with the Russian drive on Berlin in Winter 1944. Turns cover about two weeks of game time. The scenarios can be played separately or linked together to form a single campaign game. There is also a short introductory scenario, "Operation Edelweiss", designed to acquaint players with the rules.

=== Gameplay ===
Each game sequence starts with a "production phase", followed by two "I go, You go" player turns covering a fortnight, and then another two player turns covering another fortnight.

==== Movement ====
The active player activates the Headquarters units of their choice. This allows all units within the command radius of their Headquarters to move, using their rated movement under the weather conditions.

==== Combat ====
When units move into the same hex as opposing units, combat results. The players roll a number of dice equal to the units' strength ratings, and the units score a hit for each 6 rolled. If a unit is designated as having double firepower, it hits on a 5 or a 6. A successful hit reduces the strength of the defending unit by 1 – the owning player of the affected unit turns the wooden block by 90 degrees so that the reduced strength of the unit is now at 12 o'clock.

== Publication history ==
In 1974, Columbia Games founder Tom Dalgliesh designed Napoléon: The Waterloo Campaign, 1815 using wooden blocks instead of die-cut counters. Reaction was very favorable, and Columbia continued to produce "block games". One of those was EastFront, designed by Tom Dalgliesh and Craig Besinque, with cover art by Eric Hotz, and published in 1991. The following year, Columbia released Computer EastFront, a computer adaptation of the game for Microsoft Windows. Either two players can play head-to-head via a modem connection, the internet, or with an exchange of play-by-email move files; or a single player can control both sides as a solitaire game. (There is no option for player versus computer.)

Also in 1992, Columbia released WestFront, covering combat between the Allies and Germany on the western front, and in 1995, Columbia published EuroFront, enabling players to combine EastFront and WestFront into one massive wargame covering the entire European theatre.

In 2006, Columbia published a second edition of EastFront, WestFront, and EuroFront. EastFront II featured new cover art by David Pentland, and a substantial enlargement of the map area, using two 22" x 34" maps.

== Reception ==
In Issue 44 of The Canadian Wargaming Journal, Larz Hitchcock commented that "the game has remained very playable and overall fairly well balanced."

Michael C. Neubauer, in the Chicago Tribune, said the use of wooden blocks "creates the fog of war and an anxiety that is so often missing from war games in which all information is completely (and unrealistically) accessible." He concluded that the game was "a recommended buy for anyone interested in the subject."

Robert E. Waters, writing for Armchair General, had been warned about this game's complexity, but wrote "It was a pleasant surprise at just how simple this game was. [...] there’s no doubt that even the casual wargamer can quickly absorb and apply these concepts." However, Waters found the steep price tag was going to be a barrier to the more casual gamer. Despite this, he concluded, "it’s really one of the best Russian campaign games out there."

== Reviews ==
- Casus Belli #66

== Awards ==
The first edition of EastFront won several awards:

- Origins Award for "Best Modern-Day Boardgame of 1991
- James F. Dunnigan Award for "Best Playability & Design of 1991"
- Charles S. Roberts Award for "Best World War II Board Game of 1991"

The game was also a finalist for the Charles S. Roberts Award for "Best Wargaming Graphics of 1991."
