= Hârn =

Tabletop role-playing game

Hârn is a campaign setting for fantasy role-playing games, designed by N. Robin Crossby, and published by Columbia Games in 1983.

== Real world history ==
The island of Hârn was first described in 1983, in the Hârn campaign set from Columbia Games. It contains a folio with a general overview, with background, history, and religion of the island of Hârn along with the small Hârndex encyclopaedia, and a map. Shannon Appelcline has stated that "Hârn was broadly based on Norman England, with some fantasy elements appearing through dwarves, elves and orcs. It was low magic and [...] tried to create a genuinely real setting, based on careful research and consideration."

First published in 1986, the role-playing rules set HârnMaster was developed specifically for use with the setting.

In 1998 Crossby founded Kelestia Productions (KP), an electronic publishing e-company. KP and Columbia Games now independently produce printed and online materials for use with Hârn-based role-playing campaigns and fiction.

== Setting ==
Hârn is an island off the western coast of the region of Venârivè (the northwestern part of the continent of Lýthia) on the planet Kèthîra, but as Hârn has traditionally been the focus of the setting, many people refer to the world as Hârn or HârnWorld. Hârn is notable for several reasons:

- It has no 'evil' versus 'good' aspect that dominates many other FRPGs.
- It has a high level of detail and internal consistency. A large number of individual cities, fortifications, towns, manors and adventure locations have been described down to the names of the peasant families residing there. In its immense detail it rivals other game worlds known for their depth, such as Tekumel.
- It is also notable for its high level of realism and a concomitant low level of magic. Its societies are, for the most part, modeled closely on Earth during the Middle Ages (specifically, that of Norman Britain). Nonetheless, it has many of the standard trappings of fantasy, such as elves, dwarves, orcs, wizards, etc. Many of these have a unique Hârnic spin.
- The written history and events of Hârn are current up to a specific point in time (midnight on the first day of the year 720), and there is no intention of "advancing" the official timeline beyond this point. The individual game masters control the history and events that occur after this point.

The island of Hârn has seven human kingdoms and two kingdoms ruled by other species. In alphabetical order, these are:

- Azadmere is the home of the Khuzdul, the Hârnic dwarves.
- Chybisa is viewed as a struggling independent monarchy or a breakaway county of Kaldor.
- Evael is located along the southern coast and is the forest home of the reclusive Sindarian, the Hârnic elves.
- Kaldor is a feudal kingdom with a weak king. Located at the hub of four trade routes, it is a power in the east. It is perhaps the most detailed of all of the kingdoms.
- Kanday is a stolid, chivalric kingdom situated in the western part of the island of Hârn.
- Melderyn is the most ancient kingdom on Hârn, reputedly founded by wizards. It is located in the southeastern part of the island and claims a monopoly on trade with the Lythian continent.
- The northern land of Orbaal was once a collection of peaceful princedoms inhabited by the Jarin people (analogues of the British Celts) until it was conquered by the Ivinians (analogous to the Vikings). Now the Jarin are brutally suppressed, but some plot rebellion.
- Rethem is widely viewed as the "evil kingdom" but this is because its rulers value might and merit over birth and privilege (or, possibly, because its largest town was the base for a crusade by the church of the death-god Morgath). It is a kingdom born of war and beset by enemies on all sides.
- Tharda rose from the ashes of the former Corani Empire (as did Kanday and Rethem) and is the island's only non-monarchist state; its patron-client social structure is superficially similar to that of Roman Republic. Petty corruption and patronage are rife. The Republic is very ambitious in its territorial claims.

The island is also home to over a dozen human "barbarian" tribal nations and many bands of Hârnic orcs, known as gârgún.

Hârn is situated in a network of seven linked parallel worlds known collectively as Keléstia. The seven linked worlds in the family are:

- Kèthîra, the world that the island of Hârn is located, is at the center, or crossroads, of the seven linked worlds;
- Terra (or Earth);
- Yàsháin, a high-magic world which is the afterlife of Kèthîra;
- Midgaad, a parallel of Tolkien's Middle-earth;
- Blessed Realm, a parallel of the land of the same name in Tolkien's works;
- Losenor;
- Sherem, a world of shadow and silence;

In addition to the island of Hârn itself, products have been released covering the nearby regions of Shôrkýnè (a large feudal kingdom with a weak king) and Ivínia (an analogue of Scandinavia complete with fjords, Vikings, and a religion similar to that of the old Norse).

Other publications detail other areas including:

- the island kingdom of Chélemby, a mixed-Ivínian trading state (an analogue of the medieval Scandinavian trading state of Visby).
- the Hârbáaler kingdom of Lédenheim.
- the region of Venârivè (an area roughly equivalent to Europe, the Mediterranean, and the Middle-East).

== Reception ==
In the September 1983 edition of Dragon (Issue 77), Roger E. Moore liked the Hârn campaign setting. He admired the map, which he called, "beautiful. If you are a fan of fantasy cartography, the map makes a wonderful addition to one’s collection, having lots of legible detail and a well worked out ecological system and geography." Moore was also quite impressed with the booklet called the Harndex that listed all sorts of interesting information on people and places. He noted some similarities to the work of J.R.R. Tolkien, but pointed out that gamemasters could easily expunge that material if they wished. He concluded by recommending Hârn to "experienced referees who don’t mind using a largely prefabricated universe with a few minor alterations to suit their own campaign tastes... State of the art? It could be better, but it is very good."

In the March 1986 edition of Dragon (Issue 107), Eric Pass reviewed some of the supplementary material that had been published, namely the Cities of Hârn supplement, Encyclopedia Harnica #1-#13 and the regional module Ivinia. Pass liked all of them, saying, "All of these products are richly detailed and fully consistent. The only complaint I with this material is the [high] prices." He concluded that "This material is a savior for the hard-pressed GM whose players expect and demand detailed playing environments and backgrounds. All of the supplements contain well-constructed, consistent, interesting information that will take hours to absorb. Keep a notebook by your side as you read, because you’ll get all sorts of ideas for play."

In the May 1996 edition of Dragon (Issue 229), Rick Swan reviewed the re-released and revised Harn World boxed set. Swan stated that it "emphasizes culture and economics at the expense of magic and monsters, making it less appealing to hack ’n’slashers than to veterans who take their games seriously." He conceded that the rules system was very complex: "Unwieldy? Perhaps. To call Harn World ambitious is like calling the Grand Canyon a large hole." But Swan recommended the Harn World system to experienced players, saying, "If you’ve outgrown dungeon crawls, you might be ready to jump in."

In his 2023 book Monsters, Aliens, and Holes in the Ground, RPG historian Stu Horvath noted, "All of this material is methodical and internally consistent. Nothing else in the mid '80s, and a good deal after, right up to now, comes close to providing the amount of detail in Hârn. Depth and breadth. There are like a million Forgotten Realms books, and it is still no contest."

== Community ==
Columbia published most of the canon material about Hârn in the early 1980s; at that point (around the time the first edition of the Harnmaster rules was published) the interval between new products lengthened and some scheduled products were never completed (such as the Trierzon and Azeryan regional modules). The setting was sustained throughout the 1990s and early 2000s by fan-created material, popularly called "fanon." The high quality and consistency of the fanon products, as well as the interactivity of message fora such as HarnList and HârnForum have kept the setting alive.

Hârnic fanon, although independently written, is notable for its goal of staying consistent with the hundreds of pages of canon material spread over more than twenty years of publication. In many instances high quality art was produced and professional grade layout and design was done to make the material look similar to products produced by the publishers. There are points of confusion regarding the sanctioning and format of fanon. Both Columbia Games and Kelestia have different fanon guidelines.
