= Eric Hotz =

Artist

Eric Hotz is a graphic artist and illustrator.

== Early life and education ==
Hotz was born in Burnaby, British Columbia, Canada and studied at Simon Fraser University, Langara College, and Capilano College, mainly studying archaeology, art history, fine arts and commercial art.

== Career ==
Hotz worked for First Encounter Magazine (DELF) from 1983 to 1984, for Columbia Games Inc. from 1984 to 2000, and was the in-house illustrator, production editor, and cartographer. His work included interior color, black line art, map work, and cover art, for Columbia's fantasy role-playing world Hârn. He also produced board game map art for Columbia's board wargames including Rommel In The Desert, EastFront, WestFront, 1812, Bobby Lee, Sam Grant, and many other titles.

Hotz did the design and art for the role-playing game High Colonies (1988) for Waterford Publishing House Ltd. In 1992, he started working freelance for Columbia Games, and his work included art for the card game Dixie and Eagles, of which he illustrated over 1,000 cards within a year and a half.

Hotz eventually also worked freelance for companies/publishers like: TSR, Inc. (Dungeons & Dragons), Wizards of the Coast (Talislanta and Dungeons & Dragons), White Wolf Publishing (Vampire: The Dark Ages and Werewolf: The Apocalypse), Atlas Games, Avalon Hill, and many other RPG/Game publishers.

Hotz also worked for himself, creating Whitewash City, a large set of PDF Wild West cardstock buildings he researched and designed from historical sources, many from actual surviving Old West buildings. He also created Roman Seas, recreating authentic Roman warships and merchant ships in PDF format for paper construction.

In 2005, he founded his own company, Hotz ArtWorks, and also began a line of silk-screened felt game mats from his studio in Canada.

Hotz was the co-author of the Online comic strip, Larry Leadhead from 2000 through September 2012. From 2012 to 2019, Hotz also worked in the educational field as a creative director for educational teaching companies.

Starting in 2020, Hotz had his first solo art show at the MAC art gallery in Mission, BC, Canada, where he featured paintings and illustrations on natural history subjects. From 2020 to 2023 Hotz showed his work in over 14 art shows, winning several awards for his paintings, including a third-place award at the Federation Gallery (Federation Of Canadian Artists) in Vancouver, BC, Canada in October 2023. On May 27th, 2024, Hotz won "First Place" in the "2024 Landscape Exhibition" at the Federation Gallery (Federation of Canadian Artists) in Vancouver, BC, Canada. In a follow-up exhibition, on September 13th, 2024, Hotz won "First Place" in the "2024 Beautiful BC Artist Spotlight Presented By The Nature Trust of BC" at the Federation Gallery (Federation Of Canadian Artists) in Vancouver, BC, Canada, and won "Third Place" on November 19th, 2024, in the "2024 Water Exhibition" at the Federation Gallery (Federation Of Canadian Artists) in Vancouver, BC, Canada. On May 12th, 2025, Hotz won an "Honourable Mention" award in the "2025 Landscape Exhibition" at the Federation Gallery (Federation of Canadian Artists) in Vancouver, BC, Canada.

== Reception ==
In his 2023 book Monsters, Aliens, and Holes in the Ground, RPG historian Stu Horvath reviewed Hârn by Columbia Games, and noted, "The art is a significant contributor to the world's sense of cohesion, a secret truth of RPG world building ... Eric Hotz provided just about every illustration for every Hârn product from 1984 to 2000, creating a remarkably consistent visual representation of the world through sepia toned drawings that alternate between gritty realism and a flattened, faux medieval style — a clear forerunner of the single artist approach to campaign settings that TSR would adopt in the '90s. Most RPGs focus on epic clashes, but Hotz routinely favored domestic scenes and depictions of every-day objects that do so much to breathe life into the world."
