= Columbia Games =

Role-playing game company

- Type: Role-playing, block and card game publisher
- Industry: Role-playing games, board games
- Founded: 1970; 56 years ago
- Headquarters: Blaine, Washington, U.S.,
- Key people: Tom Dalgliesh, Grant Dalgliesh
- Products: wargames, card games, Harn, HarnMaster
- Website: www.columbiagames.com

Columbia Games is one of the oldest manufacturers of board wargames, and has also produced the Hârn role-playing game as well as various card games and collectible card games. Their wargames are notable for using small wooden or plastic blocks instead of the more conventional cardboard counters. The company, originally titled Gamma Two Games, started in Vancouver, Canada, but after ten years changed its name to Columbia Games, and eventually moved to Blaine, Washington. It is currently run by Grant Dalgliesh son of the founder Tom Dalgliesh.

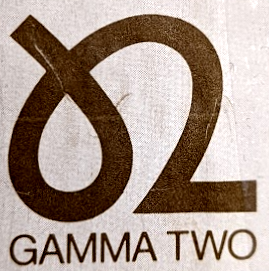
Original logo of Gamma Two Games, 1972

== Gamma Two Games ==
In 1971, Tom Dalgliesh, Lance Gutteridge and Steve Brewster all graduated from Simon Fraser University in Vancouver, and decided to start a Canadian games company called Gamma Two Games. They published their first game in 1972, the block wargame titled Quebec 1759. Brewster left the company soon after its formation, and was replaced by Ron Gibson.

The company produced two more wargames, War of 1812 in 1973, and Napoléon: The Waterloo Campaign, 1815 in 1974.

Although Quebec 1759 eventually sold over 20,000 copies, the next two titles were not as successful, and the business partners realized there was not much of a market in Canada for board wargames. Starting in 1975, they switched to more family-oriented games such as Airline (1975), Klondike (1975), Supermoney (1978), Smokers Wild (1978), Foreign Exchange (1978), Maneuver (1979), and Score! Soccer Game (1980).

== Columbia Games ==
In 1982, the partners changed the company name to Columbia Games. The following year, Columbia entered the role-playing games market with Hârn, designed by N. Robin Crossby. In the mid-1980s, both Gutteridge and Gibson left the company, leaving Dalgliesh as the sole owner. In 1986, Dalgliesh moved the company just across the American border to Blaine, Washington, where the company could do an efficient mail order business to the much larger American market without the expense of cross-border customs and duties.

The company is still based in Blaine, and Dalgliesh's son Grant is now a member of the company.

The company produces three main types of games:

- Block wargames
- Role-playing games
- Collectible card games (CCGs) and card games

== Block wargames ==
Gamma Two's first game, Quebec 1759, consisted of a board with a map, dice and plastic blocks with stickers on them.

Columbia's list of block games includes:

- Quebec 1759, simulating the Battle of the Plains of Abraham during the French and Indian War
- War of 1812 (1973), a game based on the War of 1812
- Napoléon: The Waterloo Campaign, 1815 (1974)
- Rommel in the Desert (1982)
- EastFront — the entire Eastern Front of World War II (First edition 1991, and Second Edition 2006)
- WestFront: The War in Europe, 1943-45 (1992)
- Bobby Lee: The Civil War in Virginia 1861-1865 (1993)
- MedFront: War in North Africa 1940-43 (1994)
- Eurofront: War in Europe, 1936-45 (First edition 1995, Second Edition 2006)
- Sam Grant: The Civil War in the West 1862-1864 (1997)
- Victory: The Blocks of War (1998), a generic World War II strategic, combined arms game
- Wizard Kings (2000), — fantasy armies and creatures warring at the strategic level
- Pacific Victory: War in the Pacific 1941-45 (First edition 2000, Second edition 2018)
- Hammer of the Scots (2002) — English invasions of Scotland
- Liberty: The American Revolution 1775-83 (2003)
- Gettysburg: Badges of Courage (2004) American Civil War
- Crusader Rex (2005) — the 3rd Crusade.
- Athens & Sparta (2007) — the Peloponnesian War
- Texas Glory (2008), — Texan War of Independence, including the Battle of the Alamo
- Richard III: The Wars of the Roses (2009)
- Shiloh: April Glory (2010)
- Julius Caesar: Caesar, Pompey, and the Roman Civil War (2010)
- Shenandoah: Jackson's Valley Campaign (2011)
- Borodino: Napoleon in Russia, 1812 (2012)
- The Last Spike (2015) — completing the First transcontinental railroad
- Victory in Europe (2015) — the European Theater of World War II
- Combat Infantry: WestFront 1944-45 (2017) and Combat Infantry: EastFront 1941-43 (2019) — platoon tactics during World War II
- Alliance: Multiplayer Napoleonic Wargame (2025)

== Role-playing games ==
In 1983, Columbia published Hârn, a low-magic fantasy role-playing game campaign setting created by Robin Crossby. The Hârn product line is compatible with Hârn products produced by Kelestia Productions (Crossby's own company) and is supported by additional material produced by the game's fans.

It publishes a set of supplemental materials called HârnQuest. Each issue is approximately 32 pages and includes articles about Hârnic kingdoms, cities, castles, history, creatures, and other gaming topics. New Hârn Atlas maps are also sent under this subscription as they are released.

Columbia also published the Lionheart supplement in 1987.

== Card games ==
In the late 1990s, the company began producing collectible card games based upon military themes for the American Civil War (such as Dixie) and the Napoleonic Wars (Eagles: Waterloo).

Slapshot is a card game that focuses on managing a hockey team. Players trade, take, draw new team members and attempt to challenge opponents when they feel their opponents are weak. It is not necessary to know much about hockey to play.
