= Star Fleet Battle Manual =

1977 Star Trek miniatures game

Cover of the 1977 release of the Star Fleet Battle Manual.

Star Fleet Battle Manual is a 1977 miniatures game published by Gamescience. It was designed by Lou Zocchi and Michael Scott Kurtick. It was based on elements from the Star Fleet Technical Manual and licensed from the author, Franz Joseph Schnaubelt. Gamescience also released several plastic and metal miniatures based on the ships used in the game.

== Gameplay ==
Star Fleet Battle Manual is a miniatures game where the players each control one or more starships, playable on any large flat surface. Besides the contents of the book, players also needed a 20-sided die, string or fishing line at least five foot in length, a washer and the capability to mark up the starship logs with grease pencils. The designer notes stated that Star Fleet Battle Manual was compatible with their 1973 game Alien Space Battle Manual.

== Available Ships ==
There are eight different classes of starships available for the game with logs for record keeping. Instructions were provided on the removal of the silhouettes from the book and preparation for the play.

- Heavy Cruiser (the Constitution-class starship from the Technical Manual)
- Scout (the Hermes-class starship from the Technical Manual)
- Destroyer (the Saladin-class starship from the Technical Manual)
- Dreadnought (the Federation-class starship from the Technical Manual)
- T-Type Patrol Ship (the Tholian vessel seen from the Star Trek episode The Tholian Web)
- R-Type Warbird (the Romulan Bird-of-Prey vessel seen from the Star Trek episode Balance of Terror)
- Transport/Tug (the Ptolemy-class starship from the Technical Manual)
- K-Type or R-Type Battle Cruiser (the Klingon D-7 class starship, also used by the Romulans, as seen in various episodes of Star Trek)

== Reception ==
Denis Loubet reviewed Star Fleet Battle Manual in The Space Gamer No. 42. Loubet commented that "I might have enjoyed it more if I had never played Star Fleet Battles. I'm spoiled. But the Star Fleet Battle Manual is a worthy precursor to that game, and should not be ignored."
