= Flying Tigers (game) =

1969 boardgame

Gamescience edition, 1969

Flying Tigers is a board wargame published by Gamescience in 1969 that simulates aerial combat over China by the Flying Tigers during World War II.

== Background ==
After the Japanese invasion of China in 1936, Claire Lee Chennault solicited aid in the form of an air squadron from the American government. The result was the Flying Tigers, an ostensibly Chinese air squadron of Curtis P-40B Warhawk aircraft, but under American command and control.

== Contents ==
Flying Tigers is a game based on General Chennault's airborne forces against the Japanese invading forces from December 1941 to July 1943. In addition to historical scenarios, the game includes a "what if?" scenario against Japanese naval aircraft.

== Publication history ==
Lou Zocchi began designing aerial combat games with Eagle Day: The Battle of Britain in 1968 and Twelve O'Clock High in 1969 (later published by Avalon Hill as Luftwaffe). Zocchi's third aerial combat game was Flying Tigers, published by Gamescience in 1969. A second edition was published by Third Millennia in 1973.

== Reception ==
In the 1975 book A Player's Guide to Table Games, John Jackson said that in comparison to Lou Zocchi's earlier aerial combat games, "While it is generally a less involved game, Flying Tigers does include an admixture of air tactics lacking in [Zocchi's] other two games."

In The Guide to Simulations/Games for Education and Training, Bruce Bigelow called Flying Tigers "a strange mixture", noting that the game involves air combat, but also tries to show the Japanese advance across Burma, which mainly involved land combat. Bigelow also noted that due to a printing error in the 1973 Third Millennia edition, over half of the hundred counters had to be corrected by hand. Bigelow concluded, "The game is not at all faithful to the campaign, but its tactical aspect is a fair simulation."

== Other reviews and commentary ==
- Fire & Movement 76
