= Star Patrol Mission Master Pack =

Tabletop role-playing game supplement

Star Patrol Mission Master Pack is a 1981 role-playing game supplement published for Star Patrol by Terra Games Company.

== Contents ==
Star Patrol Mission Master Pack includes three double-sided cardstock reference sheets displaying combat tables, as well as six each of character sheets, star chart sheets, small-hex sheets and square-grid mapping sheets, and a one-page adventure scenario.

== Publication history ==
The Mission Master accessory was also included in the 1982 edition of Star Patrol published by Gamescience.

== Reception ==
William A. Barton reviewed Star Patrol Mission Master Pack in The Space Gamer No. 49. Barton commented that "If you're a Star Patrol Mission Master [...] and the price doesn't deter you, you might still find the Mission Master Pack a useful purchase."
