= Zorphwar =

Space-based play-by-mail game

- Designers: Mike Shefler
- Publishers: Zorph Enterprises
- Years active: 1980 to 1985
- Genres: science fiction, play-by-mail, wargame
- Languages: English
- Systems: computer
- Players: 8
- Playing time: Fixed
- Materials required: Instructions, order sheets, turn results, paper, pencil
- Media type: Play-by-mail or email

Zorphwar is a closed-end play-by-mail game that was published in 1980. The game was designed by Mike Shefler and published under Zorph Enterprises. Shefler coded the game beginning in 1974 and drew from multiple sources in game design including magazine articles and other games. In the game, eight players constructed space fleets and battled on a 256 × 256 grid map. Players scored points per enemy ship destroyed, with the highest total winning the game. Zorphwar received fair reviews in various gaming magazines in the early 1980s, with reviewers noting it as a challenging game.

== History and development ==
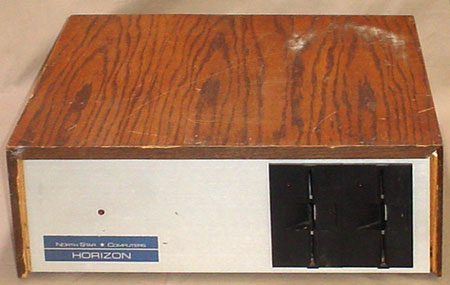
A NorthStar Horizon computer of the type used by the game's publisher.

Mike Shefler, the game designer, drew inspiration for Zorphwar from an early Star Trek computer game. He became an avid player of this challenging game after observing gameplay on a nearby terminal at the University of Pittsburgh in 1974. Deciding to improve on it, he coded a computer game over the next couple of years. The game's title came from an article of the same name in a 1979 issue of The Magazine of Fantasy & Science Fiction, which also inspired Shefler to publish Zorphwar as an original space wargame. (Note: Shefler noted that he obtained permission to use the name from the article's author.)

The game drew from multiple sources. These include the Doomsday Torpedo which came from the article providing the title. Movement was intended as an improvement on Flying Buffalo's game Raumkrieg. The boardgame Alien Space inspired various weapons.

Shefler ran the game on a "North Star Horizon computer with 64K of memory, 2 mini-floppy disk drives (single density), an LA36 Decwriter Printer", and a cathode-ray tube projector. Due to the lack of a playtest, the first game involved various growing pains with associated adjustments to the rules and program. In the September–October 1985 issue of Paper Mayhem, Zorph Enterprises announced the closure of the game due to lack of players. 18 full games had been played. The publisher stated that Zorphwar II was under development.

== Gameplay ==
Zorphwar was a game in which players had a base ship-factory allowing them to construct ships of varying sizes. This computer-moderated tactical space game comprised eight players leading customizable fleets of ships on a 256 × 256 grid map to destroy opposing ships. Players scored points per enemy ship destroyed, with the highest total winning the game.

Ship types included: Scouts, Escorts, Cutters, Lasers, Harriers, Kamikazes, Repulsors, Juggernauts, and Base Ships, which varied in Cost, Energy, Acceleration, Phasors, Tubes, and special weapons available.

== Reception ==
Sam Moorer reviewed Zorphwar in The Space Gamer No. 45. Moorer commented that "Despite its flaws and imbalances the fast pace and brisk combat gives the biggest bang for the buck in PBM today. But it's not for the role-players or those who prefer complex games with diplomatic maneuvers."

A.D. Young reviewed the game in the Summer 1984 issue of Flagship. He found the game challenging to win, noting "a combination of mobility and exotic weaponry. [Zorphwar] has a highly maneuverable and dynamically realistic movement system which is played on the surface of a toroid (donut)".

A reviewer in the November–December 1983 issue of PBM Universal described the game as challenging and "the most tactically demanding design on the market, requiring much analytical skill and hours at the calculator".

== See also ==
- List of play-by-mail games

== Bibliography ==
- Editors (September–October 1985). "Gameline – News and Items". Paper Mayhem. No. 14. p. 24.
- Editors (November–December 1983). "Gamealog". PBM Universal. No. 1. p. 32.
- Moorer, Sam (November 1981). "Capsule Reviews". The Space Gamer. No. 45. Steve Jackson Games. p. 35.
- Shefler, Mike (1981). "The Origins of Zorphwar". Nuts & Bolts of Gaming. Vol. 1, no. 6. p. 4.
- Young, A.D. (Summer 1984). "How to Fail at Zorphwar: Losing Maneuvers and Terrible Strategies". Flagship. No. 3 (UK ed.). pp. 14–16.
