= The Battle of Britain (board wargame) =

Board game

1st edition box cover

The Battle of Britain is a board wargame published by Gamescience in 1968 that is a simulation of the Battle of Britain during World War II.

== Background ==
In July 1940, Germany began aerial attacks on British airfields, cities and infrastructure in an attempt to gain air superiority in advance of an amphibious invasion (Operation Sealion). The Germans were not able to gain air superiority due to the efforts of The Few, and by the fall of 1940, Hitler had turned his attention to an invasion of the Soviet Union.

== Description ==
The Battle of Britain is a 2–4 player game in which each player controls an airplane or group of airplanes.

=== Components ===
The game box includes:

- 20" x 26" hex grid map scaled at 2 mi (3.2 km) per hex
- 138 die-cut cardboard counters
- 4 plastic-coated game cards that can be marked with crayons
- "Improved Beginner's Game" rules
- 25-page "Command Manual" rulebook (advanced rules)
- "Helpful Suggestions" sheet
- two crayons
- a six-sided die

In addition to the "Improved Beginners" rules and the "Command Manual" of advanced rules, the game also includes a set of basic rules. In the first edition, these are printed on the back of the box. In the second edition, these are printed on a sheet of paper enclosed in the game box.

== Publication history ==
While Lou Zocchi was serving in the U.S. military in Japan in the mid-1960s, he started to collect books about the Battle of Britain. Because there was no wargame on the market at that time about the Battle of Britain (or air combat), Zocchi decided to design a wargame. He sent a copy to Chris Wagner, then the editor of Strategy & Tactics, for evaluation. Wagner liked the game and put Zocchi in touch with Phil Orbanes of Gamescience. After Zocchi had copies of the game printed for $2,000, Orbanes took them to the 1968 Chicago Hobby Show, where Renwal Models made an offer to buy the Gamescience business as well as the game. Using the Gamescience imprint, Renwal published the game in 1968. A number of ambiguities in the rules were discovered, and a set of errata were published. Then a second revised edition in a smaller box was published. All together Renwal printed 25,000 copies of the game, but were only able to sell 1500 of them. In 1971, Renwal sold the remaining copies back to Zocchi as well as the Gamescience trademark, and then went out of business.

Zocchi produced several expansion kits that contained more aircraft and plotting maps.

== Reception ==
In Issue 7 of the UK magazine Games & Puzzles, Don Turnbull compared The Battle of Britain to two other air combat games, Luftwaffe and Schweinfurt, and called The Battle of Britain "the 'dirtiest' game, in terms of game mechanics, but the subject is close to the heart of the true English patriot."

In his 1977 book The Comprehensive Guide to Board Wargaming, Nicholas Palmer noted the three complexity levels, "one aimed at children and said to take under an hour." He definitely thought The Battle of Britain was a better game than Eagle Day: The Battle of Britain, but he suggested that Their Finest Hour, published by Game Designer's Workshop in 1976, better represented the operational aspects of the battle.

In Issue 71 of Moves, Joseph Miranda admitted that several more complex air combat games had been published after The Battle of Britain but called it "in many ways the most innovative. It looked at the features which made air warfare unique, rather than trying to graft on concepts from land wargames." He concluded, "All in all, Battle of Britain was a most comprehensive — and playable — look at air strategy."

In a retrospective review in Issue 5 of Simulacrum (1999), Joe Scolari called it "truly one of the grandfathers of operational air combat boardgaming." Scolari admitted that the game "has been eclipsed in nearly every category" and concluded that "Today the game is primarily of interest as a collector's curio. It serves as a reminder of just how far the state of the art has (and has not) advanced in thirty years."

In Issue 72 of Fire & Movement, Chris Perleberg called the game "clumsy." He noted that "Tracking all the unit strengths and take-off/landing times slows things up. Each turn takes a long time to plan and set up, making for serious delays which kills any excitement the game can provide." He concluded that "It takes some dedication to play."

In The Guide to Simulations/Games for Education and Training, Martin Campion questions the historical accuracy of the game, pointing out that it "contains much information about the battle, but its total impression of the battle is erroneous. [...] It forces the German player to select targets that never occurred to the German command, allows the British player to abandon defense of the area where the battle was actually fought, and allows the German player to sustain casualties that are totally unrealistic."

== Other reviews and commentary ==
- Strategy & Tactics No. 13, #15 & No. 16
- Fire & Movement #71 & #74
