= Eagle Day: The Battle of Britain =

Board wargame

Title bar on the rulebook cover

Eagle Day: The Battle of Britain is a board wargame published by Histo Games in 1973 that simulates the Battle of Britain. Reviewers noted its marked similarity to previously published wargames The Battle of Britain (Gamescience, 1968), and Luftwaffe (Avalon Hill, 1971), but found Eagle Day to be inferior to both.

== Description ==
Eagle Day is a relatively simple two-player wargame in which one player controls German bombers, and the other player controls British fighters. The hex grid map shows the southeast area of England and the coast of France. Various airplanes are represented by 142 die-cut counters. In order to simplify the game, record keeping is completely eliminated; rather than tracking the "health" and fuel supply of individual airplanes, all airplanes of a given type share the same "health" and the same amount of fuel; thus when one airplane of a given type is destroyed or runs out of fuel, all the others of the same type simultaneously suffer the same fate.

The game lasts three weeks, during which players are given ten missions. During the missions, each turn represents ten minutes of game time. The German player wins by accumulating Victory Points for bombing British airfields. The British player wins by preventing this.

An optional rule allows the game to be extended by two weeks.

== Publication history ==
In the late 1960s, Lou Zocchi designed two aerial combat games, The Battle of Britain (Gamescience, 1969), and Twelve O'Clock High (Poultron Press, 1969, later published by Avalon Hill as Luftwaffe). In 1973, Laurence Rusiecki designed an aerial combat game with similar albeit simplified rules titled Eagle Day that was published as a ziplock bag game by Histo Games.

== Reception ==
Eagle Day was not well-received by players or critics. In a 1976 poll conducted by Simulations Publications Inc. to determine the most popular board wargames in North America, Eagle Day placed a very poor 144th out of 202 games.

In his 1977 book The Comprehensive Guide to Board Wargaming, Nick Palmer recommended that players skip Eagle Day and instead try either Lou Zocchi's The Battle of Britain or Their Finest Hour by Game Designers' Workshop.

In Issue 8 of Simulacrum, Joe Scoleri explored the relationship between Eagle Day and Lou Zocchi's previously published The Battle of Britain by comparing their rulebooks and Combat Results Tables; he found "some telling similarities." But he felt that Eagle Day's complete elimination of Zocchi's record-keeping was an "ill-conceived" oversimplification that rendered the game unplayable. Scoleri concluded "Eagle Day gets my vote for the worst wargame based on the [Battle of Britain] campaign. Steer clear of this game unless you absolutely must have every Battle of Britain game produced."

== Other reviews and commentary ==
- Fire & Movement #72
