= Novelty item =

Object specifically designed to serve no practical purpose

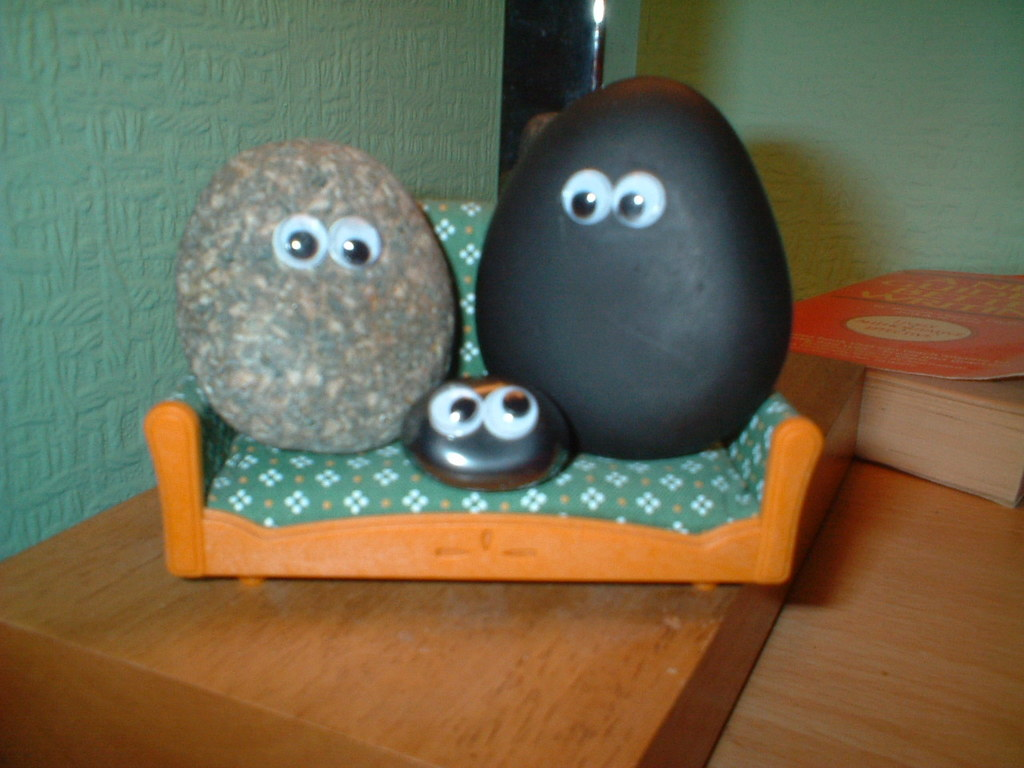
Pet Rocks with googly eyes, a novelty item popularized during the 1970s

A novelty item is an object which is specifically designed to serve no practical purpose, and is sold for its uniqueness, humor, or simply as something new (hence "novelty", or newness). The term also applies to practical items with fanciful or nonfunctional additions, such as novelty aprons, slippers, or toilet paper. The term is normally applied to small objects, and is generally not used to describe larger items such as roadside attractions. Items may have an advertising or promotional purpose, or be a souvenir.

== Usage ==
This term covers a range of small manufactured goods, such as collectables, gadgets and executive toys. Novelty items are generally devices that do not primarily have a practical function. Toys for adults are often classed as novelties. Some products have a brief period as a novelty item when they are actually new, only to become an established, commonly used product, such as the Hula Hoop or the Frisbee.

Others may have an educational element, such as a Crookes radiometer, Newton's cradle, or drinking bird.

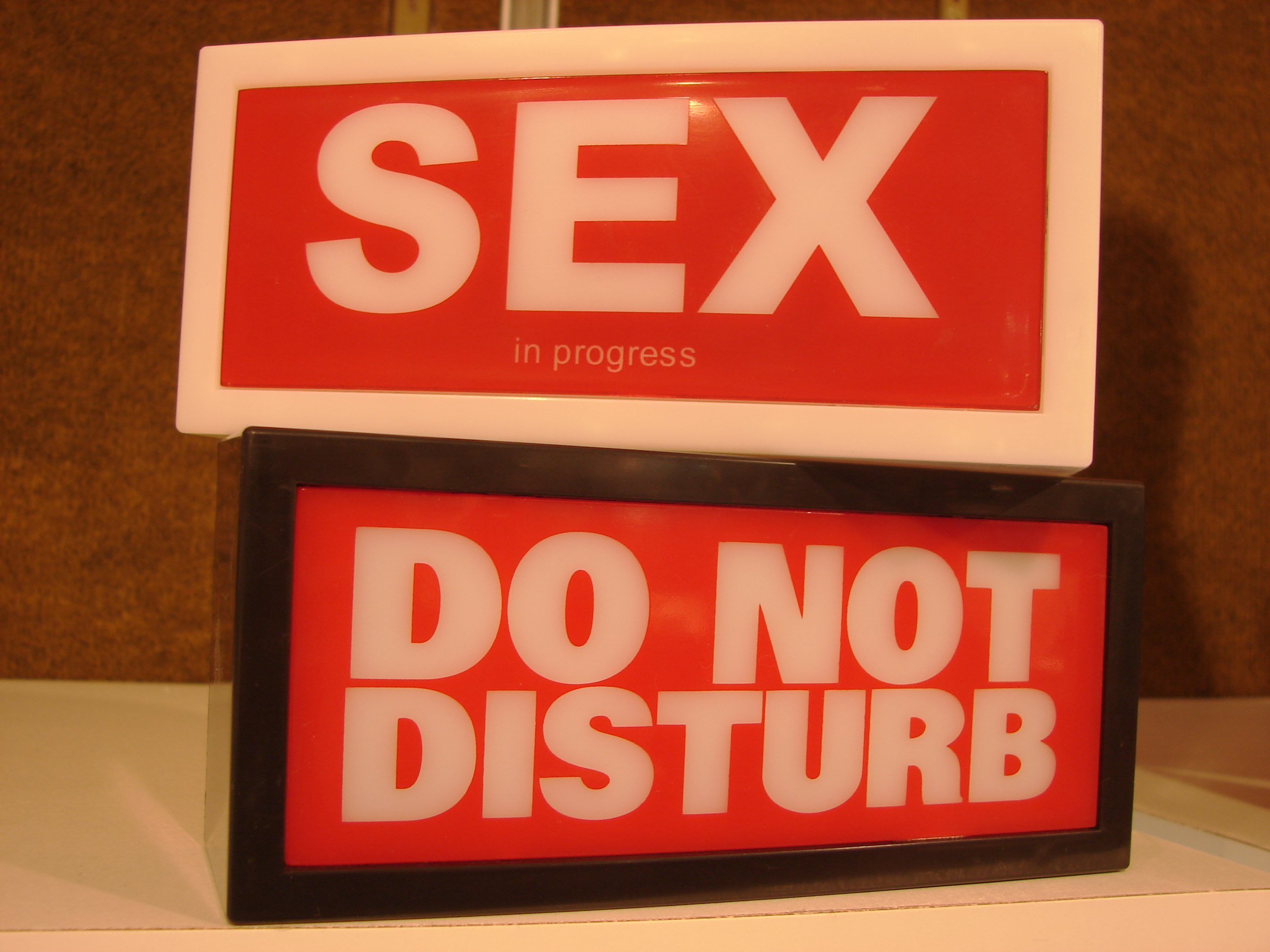
Humorous novelty signs

Sex toys are often described as novelty items (varying from this definition, as they do serve a practical purpose), and some products sold in sex shops may not have any practical sexual function, if operating primarily as a humorous gift, such as sex dice. Some food products may be considered novelty items, especially when first introduced, such as deep-fried Mars bars.

== History ==
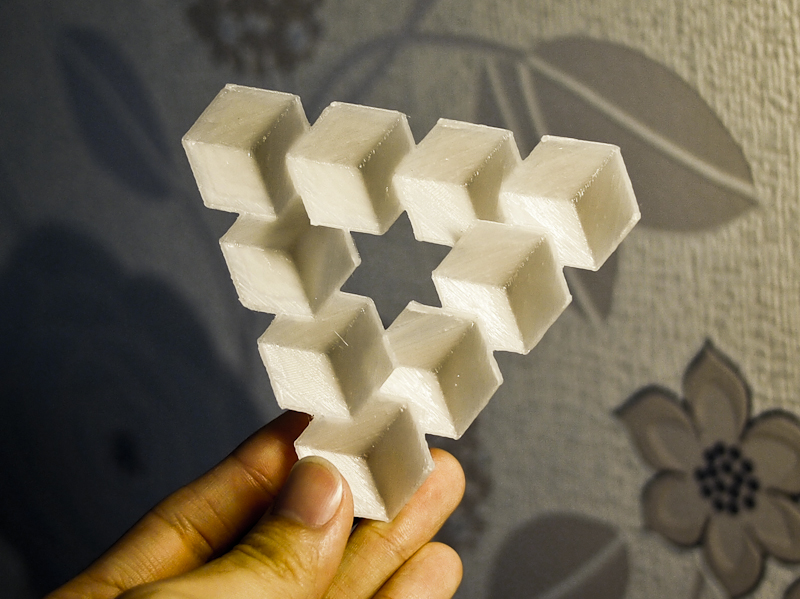
A 3D printed Penrose triangle

The French mathematician and astronomer Pierre Hérigone (1580–1643) describes a novelty item that was a camera obscura in the form of a goblet. Hérigone's device was constructed so that the user could spy on others while taking a drink. Its 45-degree mirror had a stylized opening for the lens and the lid bore a magnifying lens at the top.

Lenticular printing was developed in the 1940s, and is used extensively in the production of novelty items. Paper clothing, which has some practical purpose, was briefly novel in the United States in the 1960s.

One of the more popular novelty items in recent history was the singing Big Mouth Billy Bass, manufactured by Gemmy Industries. It is estimated that over 20 million original pieces were sold in 12 months during 2000 and 2001. According to The New York Times, Elizabeth II displayed a Big Mouth Billy Bass on the grand piano of Balmoral Castle.

Novelty items based on mathematical objects, such as Klein bottles and Penrose triangles, have been manufactured. Models of Möbius strips are sometimes made in place of regular bands, such as rings.

== See also ==
- Bric-à-brac
- Bunny slippers
- Chindōgu, Japanese neologism for an "unuseless" invention
- Ephemera
- Notion (accessory)
- Practical joke device
- Souvenir
- Tchotchke
