= Space Patrol =

Space Patrol has been the title of several science fiction works:

- Space Patrol (1950 TV series), a 1950s American television series with a concurrent radio series version
- Space Patrol (1962 TV series), a 1962 British puppet television series, shown in the United States under the title Planet Patrol
- Space Patrol Luluco, a 2016 Japanese anime television series
- "Space Patrol", one of The Simpsons shorts
- Forbidden Planet (1956) featured a starship operated by the Space Patrol
- Fireball XL5 (1962 TV series) is based around operations of the "World Space Patrol"
- Raumpatrouille, a 1966 German 7-part space opera, known as Space Patrol in English
- Several of Robert A. Heinlein's books and stories in the 1940s and 1950s featured a Space Patrol, first appearing in "Solution Unsatisfactory"
- The original title of the 1977 Gamescience role-playing game Star Patrol
