= Zocchihedron =

100-sided die invented by Lou Zocchi

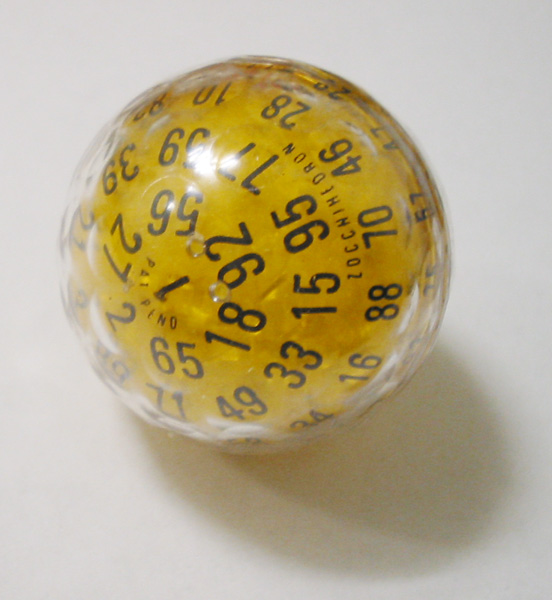
The Zocchihedron is approximately 1.5 inches (38 mm) in diameter.

Zocchihedron is the trademark of a 100-sided die invented by Lou Zocchi, which debuted in 1985. Unlike other polyhedral dice, it takes the appearance of a ball with 100 flattened spots. It is sometimes called "Zocchi's Golfball".

Zocchihedra are designed to provide percentage rolls in games, particularly in role-playing games. It is an alternative to the percentile die, which is used in conjunction with the d10 die.

== History ==
It took three years for Zocchi to design his die, and three more years to get it into production. Since its introduction, Zocchi has improved the design of the Zocchihedron, filling it with teardrop-shaped free-falling weights to make it settle more swiftly when rolled.

The Zocchihedron II is a further improved model, and has another filler.

== Probability distribution of rolls ==
A test published in White Dwarf magazine concluded that the frequency distribution of the Zocchihedron was substantially uneven. Jason Mills noticed that some numbers were spaced closer together than others, and suspected that this non-uniform placement would cause some numbers to predictably come up more than others. Mills performed 5,164 rolls and the results confirmed these suspicions; some numbers came up significantly more than others. Most notably, rolls of more than 93 or less than 8 were significantly rarer than middling results. Not coincidentally, these numbers were all spaced closer together near the "poles" of the die, as opposed to numbers near the "equator" that are more widely spaced. Similarly, the game magazine Gateways tested the Zocchihedron and found that if rolled on a hard surface such as a table, it tended to roll along the equator of the die, heavily favoring the numbers along the equator. However, "With a soft surface to roll on, the weights inside the die bring it to a quick stop and allow the die to pass the Chi-Square testing for even distribution."

After these results were published, the numbering on the Zocchihedron was redesigned with higher and lower numbers placed more evenly across all parts of the die. While numbers spaced closely together near the "poles" still come up less often, the numbers that are placed in these areas are more evenly distributed between 1 and 100, instead of consisting mainly of very high and very low numbers.

== Patents ==
The aesthetic appearance of the Zocchihedron was protected by United States design patent D303,553, which expired on 19 September 2003. The original patent did not include mention of any internal braking mechanism. There was never a utility patent for the original Zocchihedron, although United States patent 6,926,276 may have protected the braking mechanism of the Zocchihedron II. That patent expired on 9 August 2025 and applied only to "spherical dice" containing "multi sized and irregularly shaped particles".
