= Hazard (Judges Guild) =

Hazard is a 1980 role-playing game supplement for Superhero: 2044 published by Judges Guild.

== Plot summary ==
Hazard is a map of the area of the Pacific Ocean around Inguria Island, stretching from China and Japan in the north, Indonesia in the west, the southwestern coastal areas of North America with a new subcontinent in the east, and finally Australia in the south.

== Reception ==
William A. Barton reviewed Hazard in The Space Gamer No. 48. Barton commented that "those of you who haven't given up on Superhero 2044 for other, more playable, superhero role-playing systems will find much of interest and use in Hazard."
