= Strike Team Alpha =

Board game

Strike Team Alpha is a 1978 board game published by Gamescience.

== Gameplay ==
Strike Team Alpha is a game in which tactical infantry warfare is simulated between three enemy factions in the 22nd and 23rd centuries.

== Reception ==
Patrick V. Reyes reviewed Strike Team Alpha in The Space Gamer No. 33. Reyes commented that "On a scale of one to ten, I'd give Strike Team Alpha an 8.6 for an overall rating. I feel it's a good game for the experience board-gamer who wants to try miniatures. The only problem is the price."
