= MiG Killers =

Board game published in 1977

Cover of rulebook

MiG Killers is a board game published by Gamescience in 1977 that simulates combat between jet aircraft from 1945 to 1977.

== Description ==
MiG Killers is a board wargame of aerial combat for two players in which each player controls a jet fighter. The game comes with 40 historical scenarios that pair fighter aircraft equipped with technology representative of a particular era. The capabilities of each of the 57 aircraft in the game are listed on aircraft data cards. Players use control logs to track their maneuvers, weaponry and damage.

In the Basic game, each aircraft has a turn mode that dictates how quickly it can turn. In the Advanced game, each aircraft is limited by the number of G-forces the aircraft frame (and the pilot) can take. This in turn has an effect on the speed of the aircraft coming out of a turn, and whether its speed falls below its stall speed.

Due to the need to track variables and the many optional and advanced rules, the game has been characterized as "not a game for beginners," although Jon Freeman noted that in comparison to the much more complex Air War released by Simulations Publications Inc. (SPI) the same year, MiG Killers was "far more playable."

== Publication history ==
MiG Killers was designed by Michael Scott Kurtick and Rockland Russo, and was published by Gamescience in 1977. A supplement, MiG Killers Expansion Kit, was published the same year and included two more scenarios and larger aircraft data cards, although no new aircraft. Gamescience promoted a further expansion called Air Strike that would introduce air-to-ground combat, but the expansion was never published.

== Reception ==
In Issue 27 of Dragon, David Munch called this "probably the best single air warfare game available." He pointed to the use of G-force rather than turn mode as the single best rule of any then-current aerial combat game, noting that "Modern air combat is a contest not of capabilities, but of limitations. The pilot and plane which can make the best use of the differences in their limitations as compared to the opponent’s limitations will be the winner." He did find holes in the rules, commenting, "the rules are not as well written as they might be and they will require some thought to be learned." He also questioned why all of the counters used the same colors, making it hard to distinguish friend from enemy on the mapsheet. Despite this, he concluded, "At present, MiG Killers is the best air game around. It is much more advanced than any competitors and also much easier to play."

Writing for Adventure Gaming, J.D. Webster noted that his initial first impression of the game was very poor, due to the amateurish quality of the components, but added, "I made the discovery that MiG Killers was FUN! Hard to believe, considering my initial impression of this third world, poorly printed product." Webster questioned some of the abstractions done to keep the game simple, saying, "it seems that the missile combat system was simplified and glossed over to a large extent. [...] radar lock-ons automatically succeed and missiles have an unlimited range. This abstraction will ruffle the feathers of air warfare purists like myself but it keeps the game simple." Webster concluded, "if you limit the players to scenarios that involve only guns or the older tail-chasing IR missiles, then MiG Killers begins to shine. It's fast, fun and you get to see a lot of maneuvering." He did note that "Some players will object to the bookkeeping required, and realism nuts will balk at some of the abstractions in the combat rules."

In the 1980 book The Complete Book of Wargames, game designer Jon Freeman thought that MiG Killers "may be the best tactical jet-combat game going. More than any of the others, its clever mechanics capture the essence of plane-to-plane combat in the modern era." However, he found the rules an issue, saying, "The rules could stand proofreading — if not rewriting — and some of the explanations lack lucidity." Despite these issue, he concluded by giving the game an Overall Evaluation of "Good".

Twenty-five years after its publication, Joe Scoleri wrote in Issue 17 of Simulacrum that MiG Killers was "A promising game system that could have done quite well with some additional rules polishing and an improved presentation." He found the components hopelessly amateurish, pointing out the poorly die-cut counters that were all the same color. He also noted that the intervening years had not been kind to aerial combat games of the 1970s, saying, "As with other air combat boardgames of the seventies, MiG Killers is mostly a collector's item." He concluded, "The game does offer a somewhat unique perspective on jet air combat, and dedicated air gamers may enjoy the 'beer and pretzels' change of pace it offers. Just make sure to use counters out of another game — any game — as they are sure to be better than what originally came with MiG Killers!"

== Reviews ==
- Fire & Movement #18
