= Lou Zocchi =

American dice manufacturer (1935–2026)

Louis Zocchi
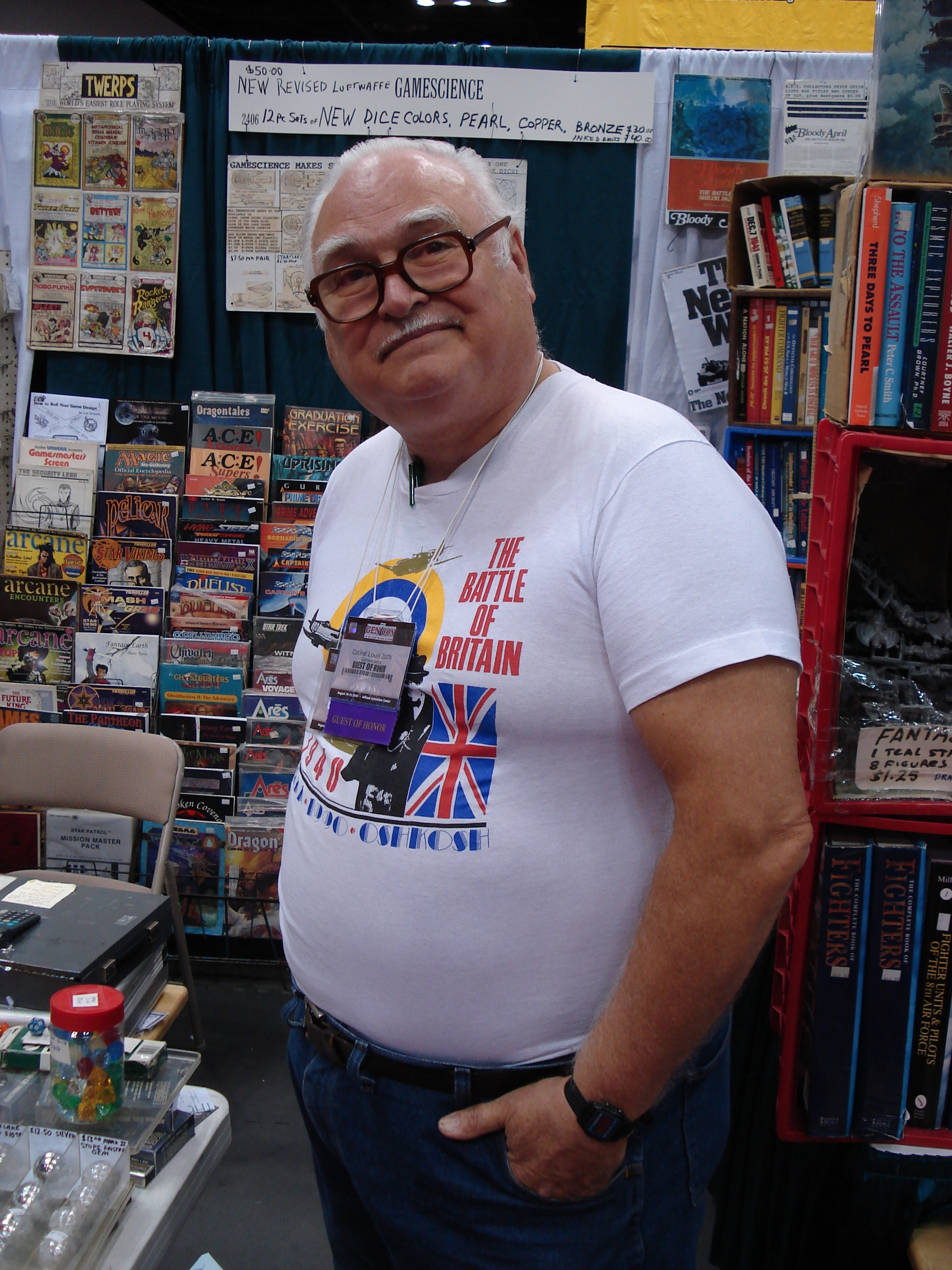
- Zocchi at his Gamescience booth at Gen Con Indy 2007
- Born: Louis Joseph Zocchi; February 16, 1935; Chicago, Illinois, U.S.
- Died: April 15, 2026 (aged 91); Mapleton, Utah
- Occupation: Dice manufacturer

Louis Joseph Zocchi (February 16, 1935 – April 15, 2026) was an American gaming hobbyist, game distributor and publisher, and maker and seller of polyhedral game dice. In 1986, he was elected to the Charles Roberts Awards Hall of Fame.

== Early life ==
Lou Zocchi was born in Chicago, the eldest child of Louis Alexander Zocchi, a machinist and engraver, and Martha Adam. Lou was fascinated by his father's precision craftmanship, and became obsessed with mathematical accuracy. Following his parents' divorce, Lou, his brother James and his sister Diane moved to Maywood, Illinois with his mother, where Lou graduated from Proviso High School in 1954.

== Military ==
After high school, Zocchi enlisted with the United States Air Force and served for 21 years, attaining the rank of Technical Sergeant, specializing as an Air Traffic Controller. His military career took him to Nebraska, Japan, New Mexico, California, and Korea. His final assignment was as instructor at the Air Traffic Control School at Keesler AFB in Mississippi. Following his retirement in 1975, Zocchi stayed in Mississippi, and continued to serve, first with the Mississippi State Guard, and then the Alabama State Defense Force., eventually reaching the rank of Brigadier General in 2021.

== Games ==
During his air force career, Zocchi became interested in wargaming, and in 1964, he became one of the first editors of Avalon Hill's house magazine, The General. He was also a regular contributor during its first 11 years of publication. He playtested such early Avalon Hill wargames as Bismarck, Afrika Korps, Jutland, Stalingrad, was well as a number of games by other publishers.

Zocchi set up Zocchi Distribution, becoming the first American distributor to sell nothing but adventure games.

Zocchi also started to design games, including Luftwaffe, The Battle of Britain, Alien Space, Flying Tigers, Hardtack, and Battle Wagon Salvo. He also designed and published the Star Fleet Battle Manual (1977) miniatures rules, which he licensed from Franz Joseph. In 1979, Zocchi's friend Stephen Cole licensed the rights from Joseph to publish the Star Fleet Battles game.

With the rise of fantasy role-playing games in the mid-1970s, Zocchi contributed to the series of books by Guidon Games that began in 1971 with Chainmail. Zocchi also produced the superhero RPG Superhero: 2044 in 1977.

Zocchi also distributed the Wee Warriors line after 1977. Zocchi helped Judges Guild with their financial difficulties in the early 1980s by paying them $350 every time they gave him the rights to reprint their out-of-print supplements.

In February 1998, Mike Hurdle of Holly Springs, Mississippi purchased Zocchi Distribution.

== Dice ==
Popular role-playing games such as Dungeons & Dragons used polyhedral dice, and Zocchi became interested in the design and manufacture of them. Most dice, according to Zocchi, did not roll accurately because of flawed manufacturing processes, causing them to favor certain numbers. Zocchi believed that this was because major dice manufacturers smoothed out the straight edges of their dice in machines much like rock tumblers. The result was that the dice, even if they were originally molded evenly, became uneven and unbalanced. Zocchi demonstrated the imperfections of these dice with statistical results and with photographs of uneven die edges, faces and vertices.

Zocchi decided to manufacture perfectly accurate dice with sharp edges, and founded a company, Gamescience, to produce them. He also invented and produced several "non-standard" dice including a 3-sided die, a 5-sided die, a 14-sided die, a 16-sided die, and a 24-sided die.

=== Zocchihedron ===
Zocchi also invented a 100-sided die, dubbed the Zocchihedron. However in January 1987, White Dwarf published a letter from Jason Mills of Manchester, who shared the statistical results of 5164 rolls that proved that numbers 1–10 and 91–100 were less likely to be rolled. This was because when Zocchi numbered the die, he clustered these numbers at the north and south poles of the die, where the faces were slightly different sizes than the faces around the equator of the die. Similarly, the game magazine Gateways tested the Zocchihedron and found that if rolled on a hard surface such as a table, it tended to roll along the equator of the die, heavily favoring the numbers along the equator. However, "With a soft surface to roll on, the weights inside the die bring it to a quick stop and allow the die to pass the Chi-Square testing for even distribution." As soon as the articles came out, Zocchi adjusted the numbering on the die to ensure that numbers were randomly scattered around the die rather than being clustered together. This revision prevented the bias against very high and very low numbers.

The original die had been white with black lettering. To differentiate between older, uncorrected dice and the newer "truer" dice, Zocchi manufactured new Zocchihedrons in a variety of other colors.

== How to $ell Your Wargame Design ==
As game designer Stephen V. Cole noted, Zocchi ran a seminar every year at Gen Con on "starting a game company and selling your wargame design." In 1975, Zocchi distilled this into a 16-page booklet, How to $ell Your Wargame Design that he self-published. The book included a list of game publishers, as well as various publishing goods and services for the person wanting to self-publish a game.

=== Reception ===
In Issue 35 of The Space Gamer (January 1981), American game designer Steve Jackson noted the book's largest drawback was that it verged on being out of date: "Most of the basic advice is still sound, but many of the names on those lists are certainly obsolete. And don't take the copyright advice. The laws have changed since Lou wrote this book." Jackson also warned that the result would not be pretty, since Zocchi was advising self-publishers how to save money. "It tells you how to do a cheap-looking job without spending every cent you own." Despite this, Jackson concluded, "On the whole, I recommend this book highly. I wish I'd seen it a year ago. If you ever intend to see a design professionally, order this one."

== Recognition ==
In 1987, Zocchi was inducted into the Academy of Adventure Gaming's Hall of Fame, and into the Academy of Adventure Gaming Arts & Design Hall of Fame.

In 2009, Zocchi was honored as a "famous game designer" by being featured as the king of clubs in Flying Buffalo's Famous Game Designer Trading Cards deck.

In 2022, Zocchi received the E. Gary Gygax Lifetime Achievement Award for his "significant contributions over [his] lifetime to the industry."

== Personal life and death ==
Zocchi married Elisa Scott in 1959, and they raised a family of four children. At the time of his death, he had eight grandchildren and seven great-grandchildren.

Early in Zocchi's life, his mother had given up her youngest infant daughter Joan for adoption, and the family lost touch with her. In 2012, Joan contacted Zocchi and the two were reunited.

Zocchi was a talented musician, able to play ukulele, violin, viola, trombone, trumpet, guitar, and electric bass. In 1971, he won first place in the Air Force World Wide Talent Contest by playing the song “Exodus” on a musical saw. He also was a magician and ventriloquist, performing with his dummy Woody Knotts.. For five decades, he played jazz piano, drums and bass fiddle with various jazz societies in Biloxi and New Orleans.

In 2022, age 87, Zocchi moved from Mississippi to Mapleton, Utah to be closer to his children and their families. Zocchi died on April 15, 2026, at the age of 91.
