= Superhero: 2044 =

Tabletop superhero role-playing game

Superhero: 2044 is a role-playing game first published by its designer Donald Saxman in 1977 and republished by Lou Zocchi later that year.

== Description ==
Superhero: 2044 is a superhero science fiction system set in 2044, with background material on the future world and rules for character creation, combat, movement and scenario design. The second edition of the game includes rules for solo play.

The game takes place in the year 2044 following a global holocaust, on the island of Inguria off the west coast of the United States, which has become a significant center of civilization. The game includes maps of both the island and its city. Due to radiation exposure, some humans gained superhuman powers. The three basic types of ability are the "ubermensch", with enhanced physical combat abilities; the "unique", with the extraordinary abilities due to a beneficial mutation; and the "toolmaster", who is an expert in technology.

== Characters ==
Player characters are designed using 140 points that get divided between seven characteristics: vigor, stamina, charisma, endurance, mentality, ego and dexterity. The player adjusts these scores based on character type and a personal bonus is added based on what the character is specialized in.

== Gameplay ==
Play involves two parts: face-to-face scenarios between characters, and the activities of the rest of the week. The scenarios give scores for activities such as crime prevention, location, getting leads, convictions and successfully avoiding damage to people and property. In the other part of play, each player fills out a weekly planning sheet listing when their character is spending time patrolling, resting, training or researching.

== Publication history ==
Superhero: 2044 was designed and published by Donald Saxman in 1977, with art by Mick Cagle, as a 32-page book with a black and white cover. A second edition was published the same year by Lou Zocchi as a ring-bound 50-page book, with a color cover.

Superhero 2044 is the earliest example of a professionally produced superhero role-playing game. Judges Guild published Hazard, the game's only published adventure.

== Reception ==
Eamon Bloomfield reviewed Superhero: 2044 for White Dwarf #9 (Oct/Nov 1978), giving it an overall score of 6 out of 10, and concludes his review by stating, "The rules are well worked out and cover most eventualities with clear examples. On the other hand this is not a game for maths and table-shy GMs as everything is down to modified probabilities with the usual resultant working out to do. As with most such games setting up requires some time but at least here the world is already designed. Overall good fun and realistic and a welcome addition to any role playing fan's collection. Certainly as a postal game it has a great future. It might even convert quite readily to a computer based programme in a similar way to 'Starweb'."

In his 1991 book Heroic Worlds: A History and Guide to Role-Playing Games, Lawrence Schick described the game as "Ground-breaking", although he called the rules "primitive".

In the 1980 book The Complete Book of Wargames, game designer Jon Freeman was disappointed in this game calling it "neither as plausible as En Garde! nor as exciting as Dungeons & Dragons." He further noted that "While the rules are quite detailed in many respects, they are not particularly clear or well organized. In fact, except for some marvelous illustrations, the whole thing is rather sloppily put together." Freeman gave this game an Overall Evaluation of "Fair", concluding, "It's unique, though, and comics fanatics who are already knowledgeable role-playing gamers could have fun with it."

== Reviews ==
- The Playboy Winner's Guide to Board Games
