= Alien Space Battle Manual =

Board wargame

Alien Space is a science fiction board wargame published by Gamescience in 1973 that simulates space combat as seen in the Star Trek television show.

== Gameplay ==
Alien Space is a two-player game in which each player chooses one of eight different ships and engages in space combat. Each ship has a secret weapon that the other player is unaware of until it is used. There is no map. Instead, ship counters are placed on any flat surface, and the physical distance between the counters is measured for movement and combat effects.

== Publication history ==
In 1972, Lou Zocchi designed and released Star Trek Battle Manual, a space combat game based on the Star Trek television show that featured an illustration of the iconic USS Enterprise on the cover. However, Zocchi did not have a license from the trademark holder Paramount Pictures; when Paramount objected, Zocchi was forced to recall all unsold copies of the game. Zocchi revised the rules to omit all references to Star Trek, increased the number of ship models from 3 to 8, and released Alien Space Battle Manual through his publishing company Gamescience in 1973.

Several years later, Zocchi identified a loophole in Paramount's trademark and successfully acquired a license through Franz Josef Designs to utilize Star Trek ship designs and certain Star Trek races, including the Klingons. Zocchi proceeded to revise the rules of the game Alien Space Battle and rebranded it as the Star Fleet Battle Manual, which was released in 1977.

== Reception ==
In Issue 3 of The Space Gamer, Steve West was impressed with the game, commenting "The game is quite fun [...] It is played with pure skill, no die rolling involved."

In the inaugural issue of Ares Magazine, Greg Costikyan was not overly enthusiastic but admitted "Alien Space is not for the hard-core simulations freak, but it's certainly a pleasant way to kill an afternoon." He concluded by giving the game an average rating of 6 out of 9.

In his 1977 book The Comprehensive Guide to Board Wargaming, Nicholas Palmer commented that even without overt reference to Star Trek, Alien Space was still a "small Star Trek-based game." Palmer liked the surprise element of the game, since each ship had "surprise secret weapons unknown to the other players."

In Issue 44 of Strategy & Tactics, game designer Sid Sackson thought this game had many "unique weapons systems ... [and] imaginative concepts" but warned that the game had to be played "on the floor of a fairly large room."

== Other reviews and commentary ==
=== 1972 edition ===
- Panzerfaust #53 and #61

=== 1977 edition ===
- Campaign #81
- Games & Puzzles #69
