= Star Patrol =

Tabletop role-playing game

Star Patrol (originally known as Space Patrol) is a science fiction role-playing game published by Gamescience in 1977.

== Description ==
Star Patrol is a science-fiction space-adventure role-playing system. In the initial release, Space Patrol, the brief rules cover character creation and abilities, psionics, alien creatures, gravity, and combat with superscientific weapons.

In the revised edition retitled Star Patrol, character creation has been expanded to include the ability to generate an alien character from one of 32 races, the choice of professions such as soldier, engineer, scientist, astronaut, trader, rogue/thief, and spy/diplomat, a choice of 25 skills, as well as the possibility of adding cybernetic body parts and psionic abilities. The game also includes monsters, starship design and combat, and statistics for weapons ranging from a simple dagger to a heavy blaster. Five introductory miniscenarios are included.

In the second edition of Star Patrol, statistics for starships taken from other fictional sources such as Star Trek's USS Enterprise are included.

== Publication history ==
Space Patrol was designed by Michael Scott Kurtick and Rockland Russo, and published by Gamescience in 1977 as a 32-page book. The game was revised, expanded and re-released as Star Patrol in 1980 as a boxed set containing a 68-page book, a large deck plan for a small "Pioneer" class startship, a large hex grid sheet, cardstock miniatures, and dice.

In 1981, Gamescience released the supplementary Star Patrol Mission Master Pack that contained reference sheets for combat. A second edition of Star Patrol was published in 1982.

== Reception ==
In the 1980 book The Complete Book of Wargames, game designer Jon Freeman reviewed the original Space Patrol, and although he liked the light-hearted approach, he noted "there is a clear implication that Space Patrol is supposed to be something other than just a combat system — and it isn't. Scenario generation consists of five short paragraphs of broad suggestions. The creation of entire worlds is relegated to one very brief table. There is little provision for experience and none whatsoever for spaceships, alien cultures, general background, daily existence, or plain ordinary motivation." Freeman gave this game an Overall Evaluation of "Good (as a combat system); Poor (as a game system)", concluding, "as the basis of a campaign, you could do as well with the game of Monopoly."

Steve List reviewed Star Patrol for Different Worlds magazine and stated that "Taken altogether, SP is flawed by incompleteness and an attempt to include everything the designers have read and enjoyed in SF. It is not a game for inexperienced players or those who require well-defined rules. Rules tinkerers could grow to love it, and given the attempt to embrace everything under the stars in it, it could be a good sourcebook for other games. Those people who want a good sit-down-and-play set of rules would be better off looking elsewhere."

In The Space Gamer No. 47, William A. Barton noted that the original Space Patrol had been one of the earliest science fiction role-playing games, but was essentially just a system of character generation and a combat system, and had been rapidly out-classed by more complete and professional games such as Traveller. However, he found that the new Star Patrol "is, in effect, a whole new system ... a complete game system, incorporating, improving and expanding upon the old and adding a space travel and combat system, star system and planet generation tables and several sample scenarios." Barton did note some flaws — the rules were a bit vague in places and some charts and tables were unclear. But Barton concluded, "Overall, Star Patrol is a valid alternative to Traveller. Relatively complete – and playable."

Eric Goldberg reviewed Star Patrol in Ares Magazine #11 and was disappointed, commenting, "Star Patrol is a failure as a game, largely because of its incompleteness. The designers display flashes of brilliance and a talent for elegant development, but much too infrequently to make this a useable game. It is an excellent collection of ideas for sf role-playing, and I would recommend it highly to someone interested in an accessory for Traveller, Space Opera, or Universe."

In the February 1982 edition of Dragon, Bill Fawcett questioned the reason for placing a powerful ship like the USS Enterprise into a game beside the player's small Pioneer-class ship. And although Fawcett found the rules "clearly written", he noted the lack of an index. Despite these issues, he concluded, "If you are interested in SF gaming, you will probably want a copy of these rules."

== Other reviews and commentary ==
- Moves #37, p17 (as "Space Patrol")
- The Playboy Winner's Guide to Board Games
- The Guide to simulations/games for education and training
