= Dice =

Marked objects for finding random numbers

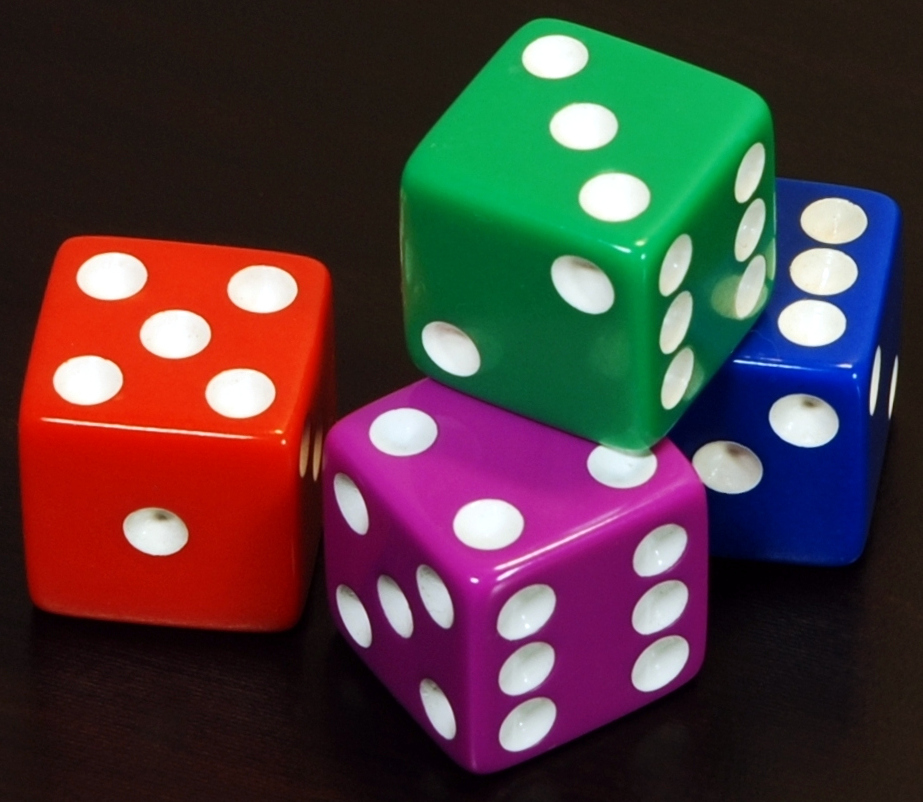
Four traditional dice showing all six different sides

Dice of different sizes being thrown in slow motion

A die (plural: dice, sometimes also used as singular) is a small, throwable object with marked sides that can rest in multiple positions. Dice are used for generating random values, commonly as part of tabletop games, including dice games, board games, role-playing games, and games of chance.

A traditional die is a cube with each of its six faces marked with a different number of dots (pips) from 1 to 6. When thrown or rolled, the die comes to rest showing a random integer from one to six on its upper surface, with each value being equally likely. Dice may also have other polyhedral or irregular shapes, may have faces marked with numerals or symbols instead of pips and may have their numbers carved out from the material of the dice instead of marked on it. Loaded dice are specifically designed or modified to favor some results over others, for cheating or entertainment purposes.

== History ==
Dice have been used since before recorded history, and their origin is uncertain. It is hypothesized that dice developed from the practice of fortune-telling with the talus of hoofed animals, colloquially known as knucklebones. Native Americans of the Great Plains region are speculated to have used dice since at least 12,000 years ago (approximately 10000 BCE). The Ancient Egyptian game of senet (played before 3000 BCE and up to the 2nd century CE) was played with flat two-sided throwsticks that indicated the number of squares a player could move, and thus functioned as a form of dice. Possibly the oldest known dice were excavated as part of a backgammon-like game set at the Burnt City, an archeological site in south-eastern Iran, estimated to be from between 2800 and 2500 BCE. Bone dice from Skara Brae, Scotland have been dated to 3100–2400 BCE. Excavations from graves at Mohenjo-daro, an Indus Valley civilization settlement, unearthed terracotta dice dating to 2500–1900 BCE, including at least one die whose opposite sides all add up to seven, as in modern dice.

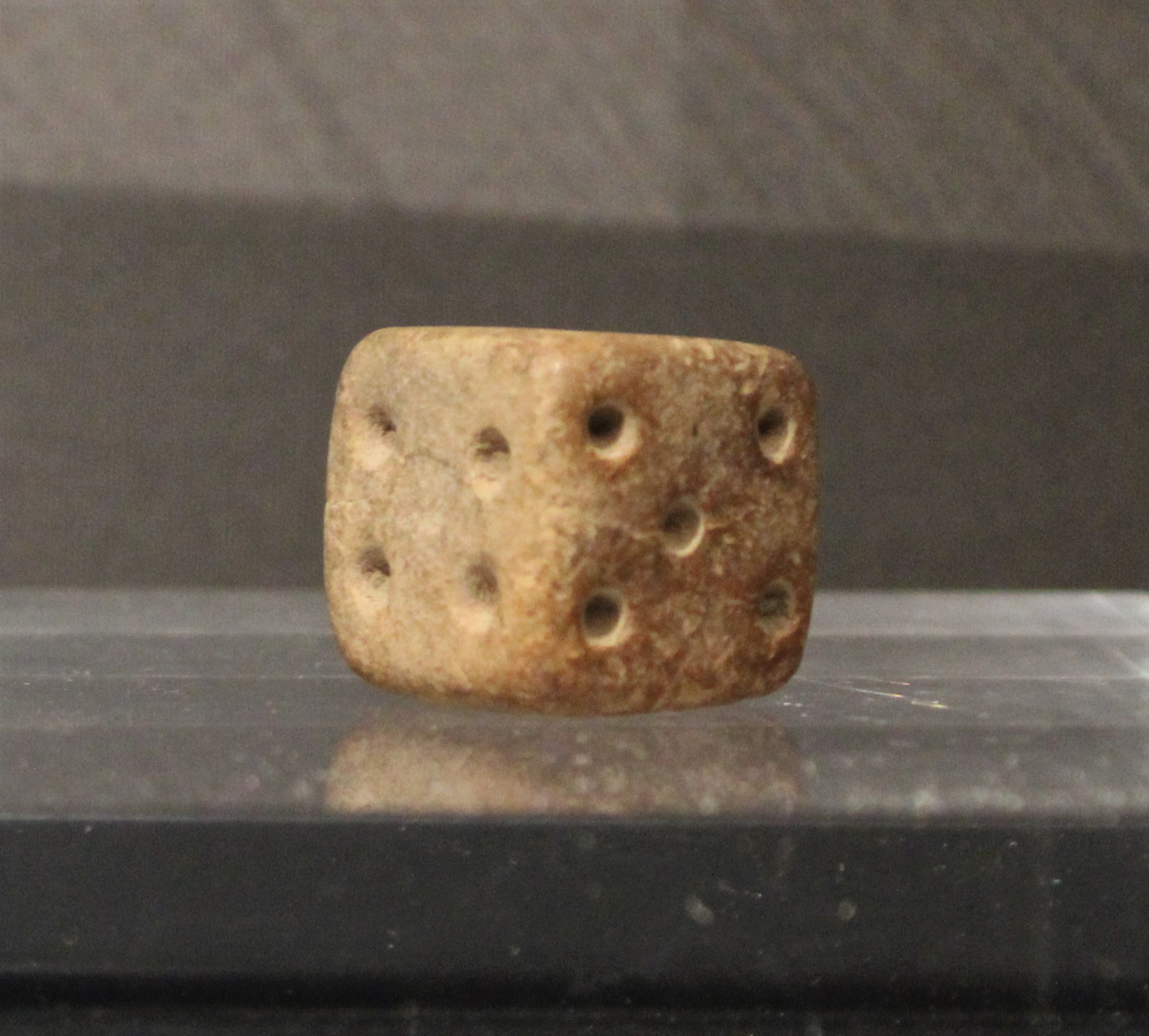
Terracotta die from Mohenjo-daro, c. 2600–1900 BCE

Games involving dice are mentioned in the ancient Indian Rigveda, Atharvaveda, Mahabharata and the Buddhist games list. Knucklebones was a game of skill played in ancient Greece; a derivative form had the four sides of the bones assigned different values, like modern dice.

Although gambling was illegal, many Romans were passionate gamblers who enjoyed dicing, which was known as aleam ludere ("to play at dice"). There were two sizes of Roman dice. Tali were large dice inscribed with one, three, four, and six pips on four sides. Tesserae were smaller dice with sides numbered from one to six. Twenty-sided dice date back to the 2nd century CE and from Ptolemaic Egypt as early as the 2nd century BCE.

Dominoes and playing cards originated in China as developments from dice. The transition from dice to playing cards occurred in China around the Tang dynasty (618–907 CE), and coincides with the technological transition from rolls of manuscripts to block printed books. In Japan, dice were used to play a popular game called sugoroku. There are two types of sugoroku. Ban-sugoroku is similar to backgammon and dates to the Heian period (794–1185 CE), while e-sugoroku is a racing game.

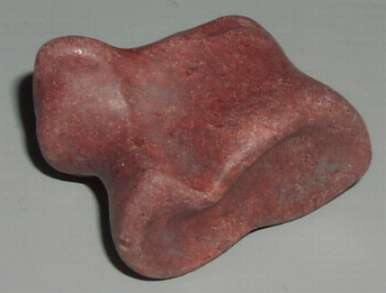
Knucklebones die, made of soapstone

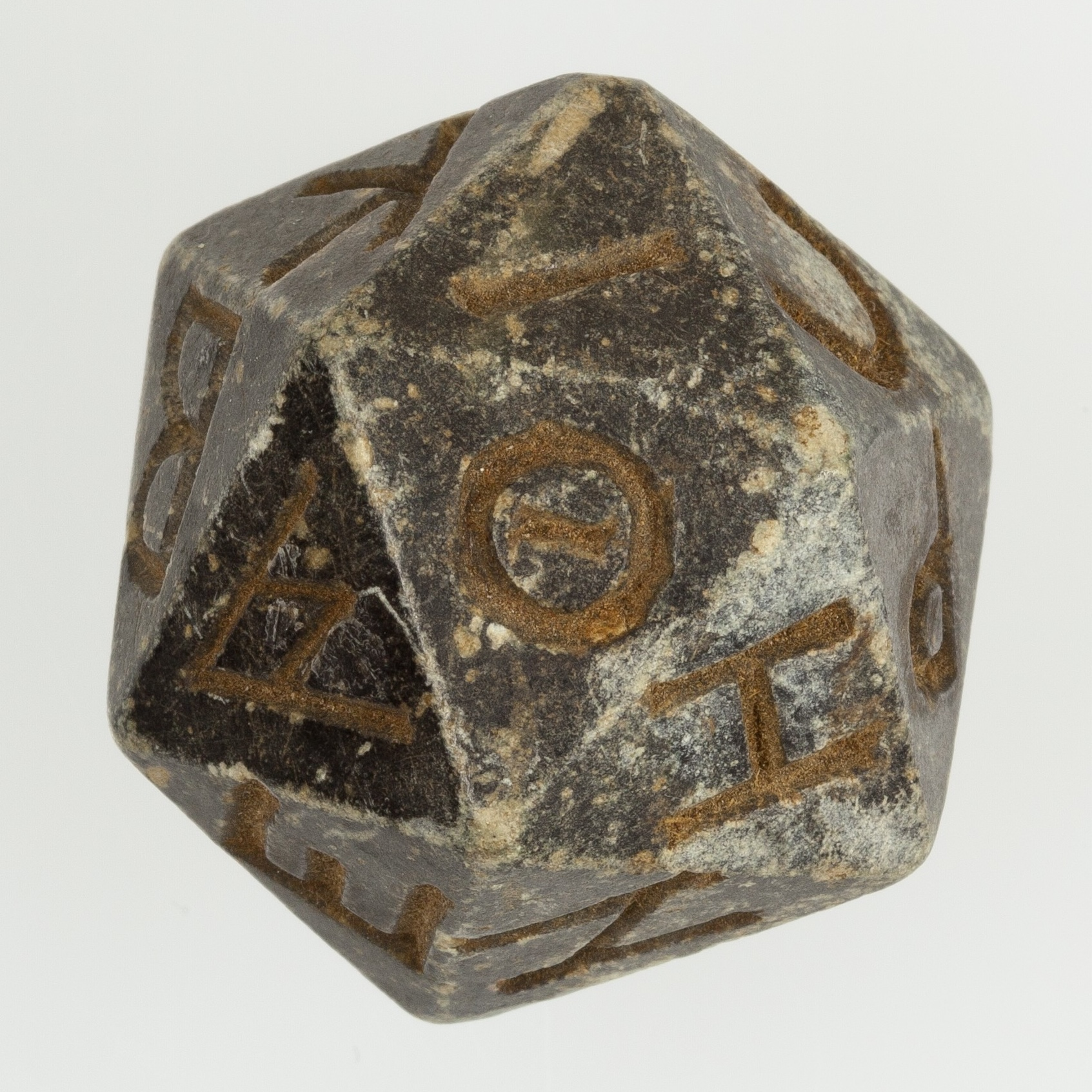
Twenty-sided serpentinite die from Ptolemaic Egypt

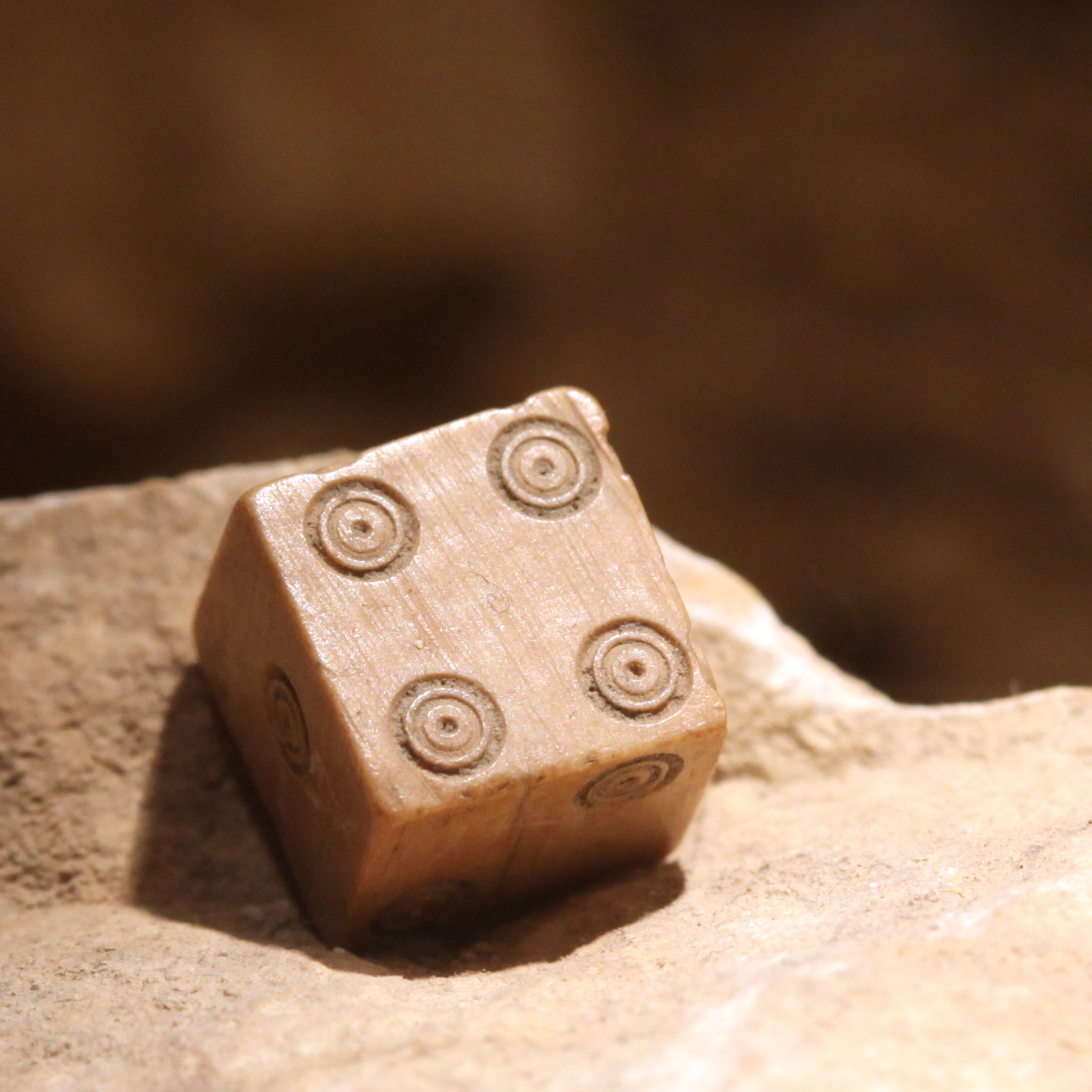
Roman die

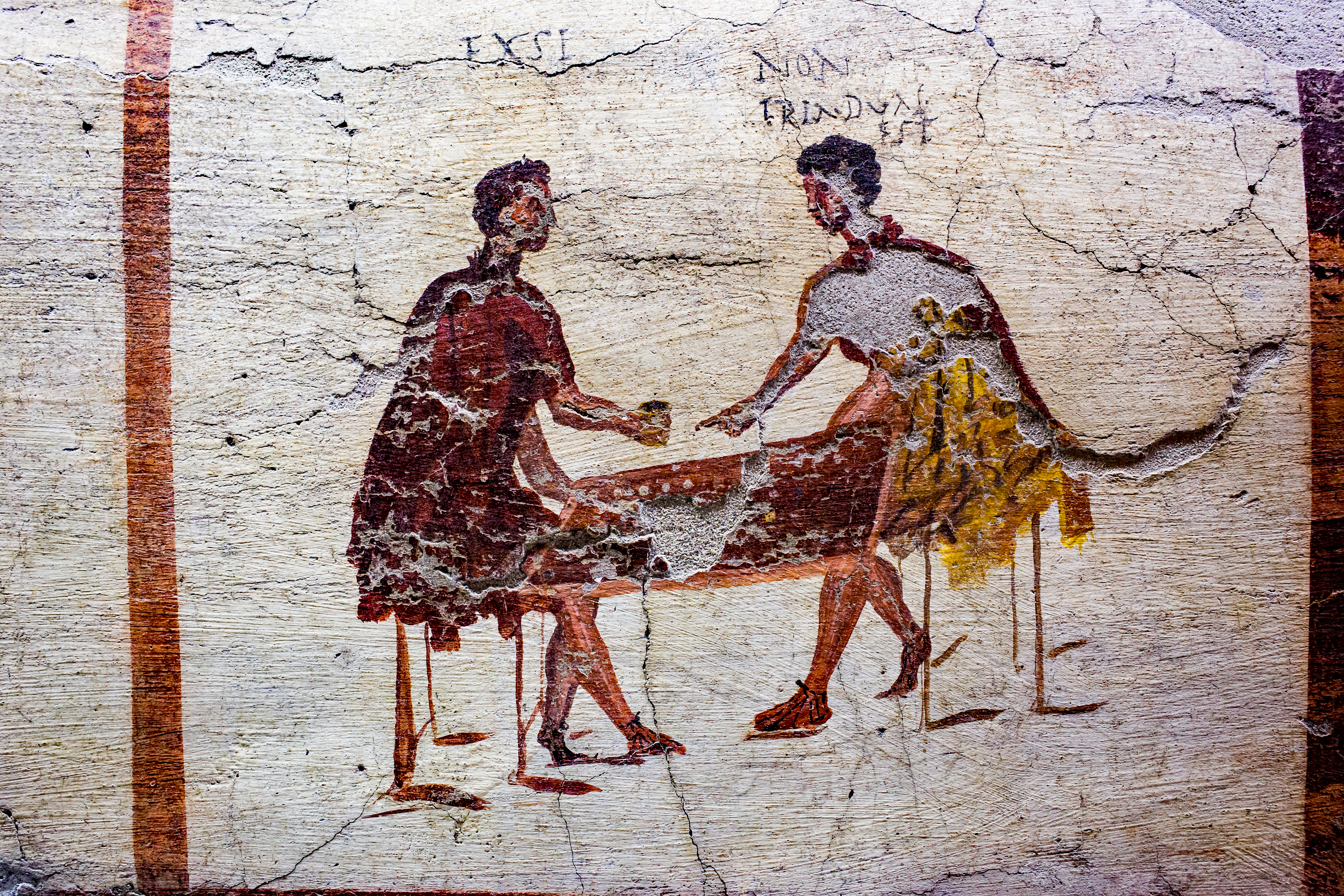
Roman wall painting showing two dice-players, Pompeii, 1st century
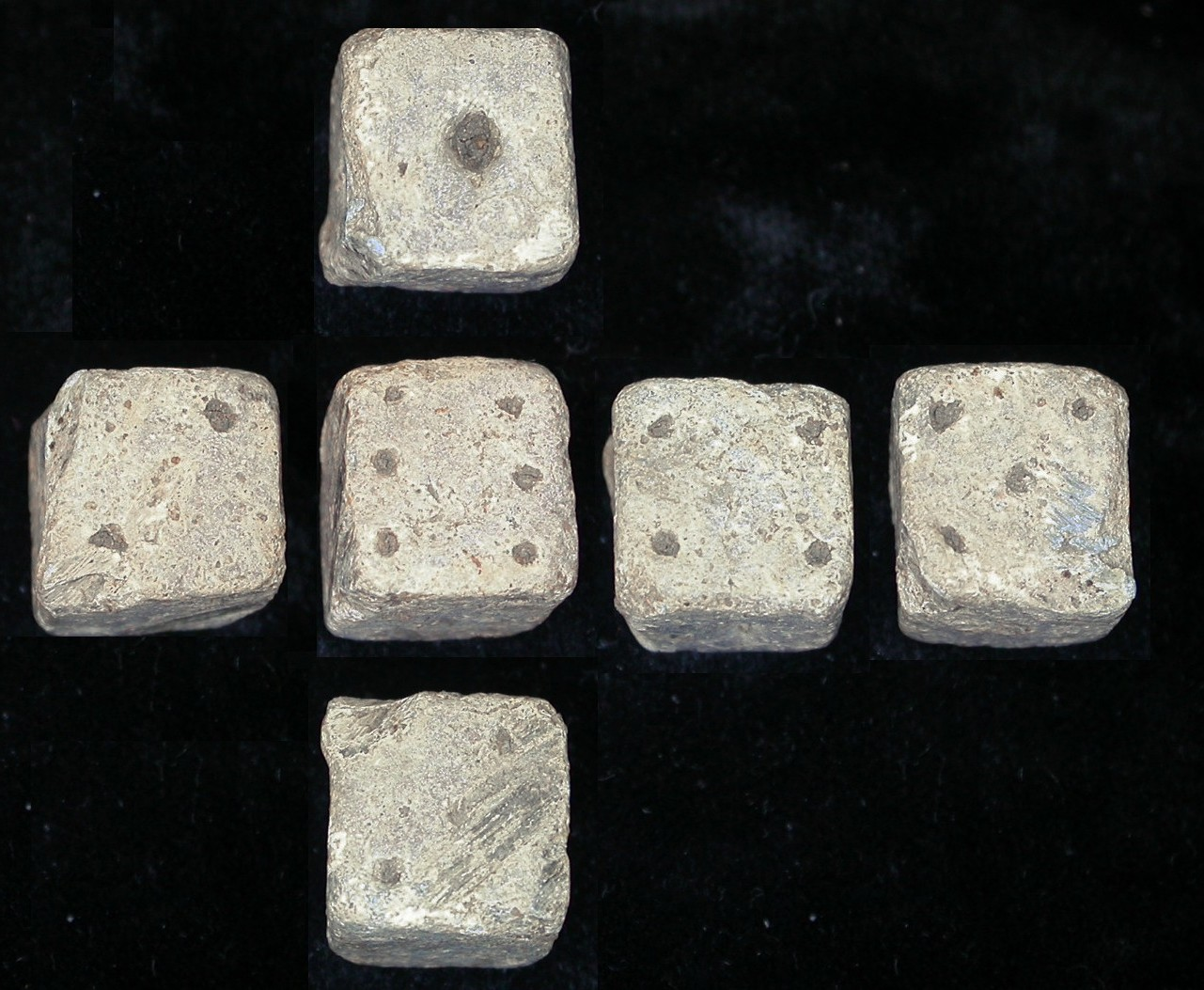
Composite image of all sides of a 12 mm (1/2 in) Roman die, found in Leicestershire, England

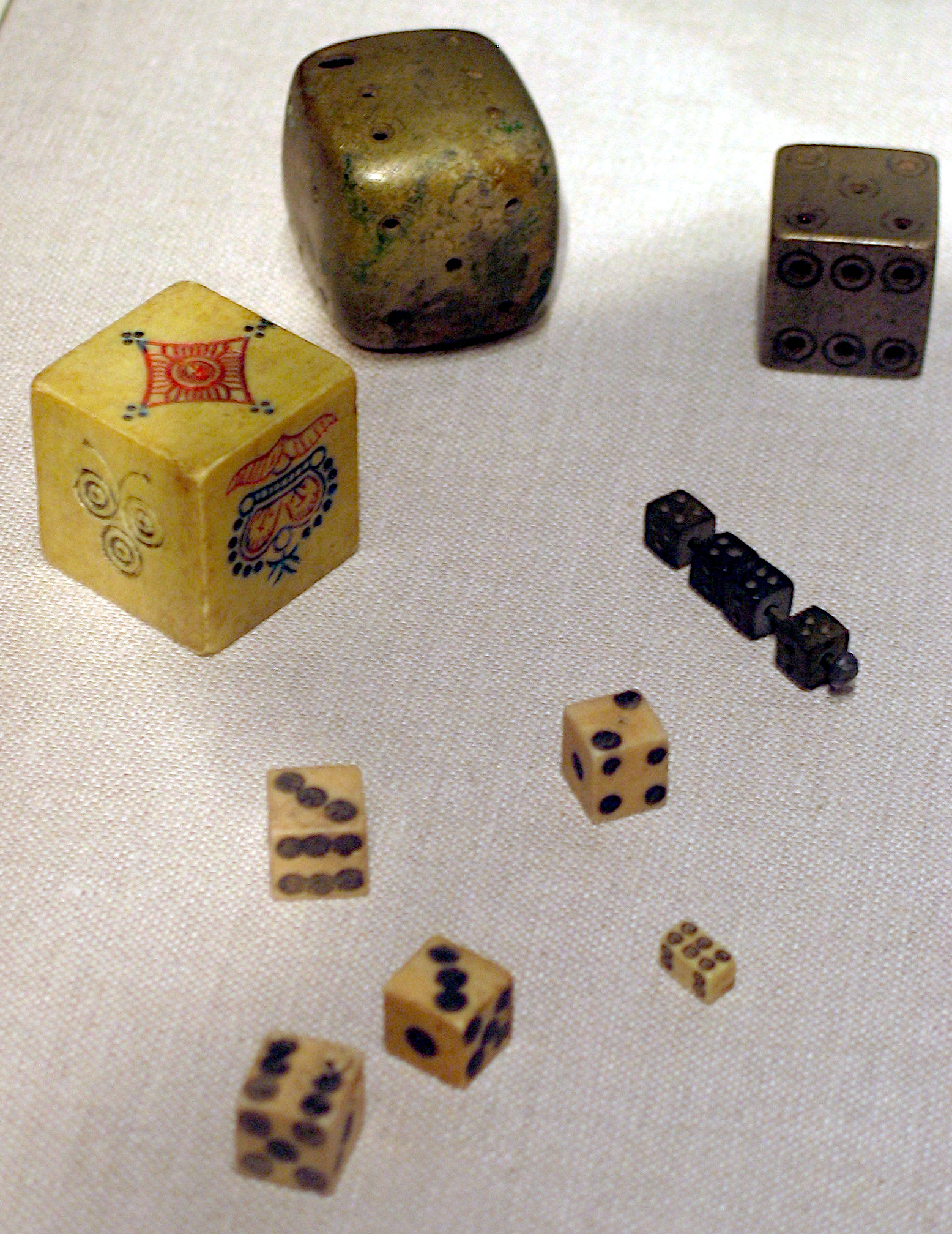
A collection of historical dice from various regions of Asia

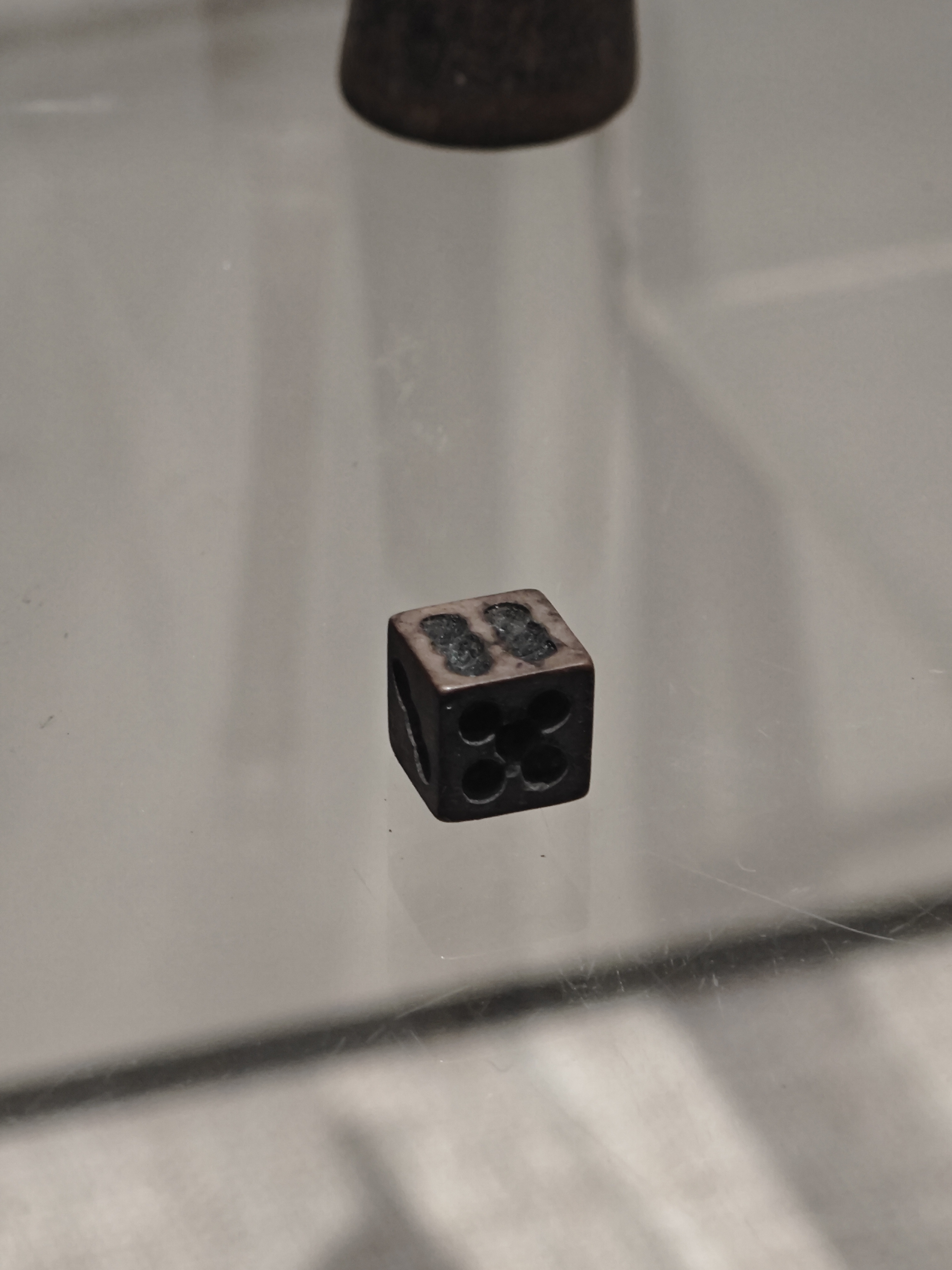
Chinese dice from Late Yuan Dynasty to early Qing Dynasty in Jiangyin Museum, China.

== Etymology and terms ==
The word die comes from Old French dé; from Latin datum "something which is given or played".

While the terms ace, deuce, trey, cater, cinque and sice are generally obsolete, with the names of the numbers preferred, they are still used by some professional gamblers to designate different sides of the dice. Ace is from the Latin as, meaning "a unit"; the others are 2 to 6 in Old French.

When rolling two dice, certain combinations have slang names. The term snake eyes is a roll of one pip on each die. The Online Etymology Dictionary traces use of the term as far back as 1919.

The US term boxcars, also known as midnight, is a roll of six pips on each die. The pair of six pips resembles a pair of boxcars on a freight train. Many rolls have names in the game of craps.

== Use ==
Dice are thrown onto a surface either from the hand or from a container designed for this (such as a cup, tray, or tower). The face (or corner, in cases such as tetrahedral dice, or edge, for odd-numbered long dice) of the die that is uppermost when it comes to rest provides the value of the throw.

Although the result of a die roll could be predicted by handling it in a strictly controlled way, it is not typically the case and the symmetry of the die is broken when it is thrown, effectively yielding a random number.

== Construction ==
Chirality of dice: Faces may be placed counterclockwise (top) or clockwise.

=== Arrangement ===
Common dice are small cubes, most often 1.6 cm (0.63 in) across, whose faces are numbered from one to six, usually by patterns of round dots called pips. (While the use of Arabic numerals is occasionally seen, such dice are less common.)

Opposite sides of a modern die traditionally add up to seven, requiring the one, two, and three faces to share a vertex. The faces of a die may be placed clockwise or counterclockwise about this vertex. If the one, two, and three faces run counterclockwise, the die is called "right-handed". If those faces run clockwise, the die is called "left-handed". Western dice are normally right-handed, and Chinese dice are normally left-handed.

Typical facets showing the more compact pip arrangement of an Asian-style die (top) vs. a Western-style die (bottom)

The pips on standard six-sided dice are arranged in specific patterns as shown. Asian style dice bear similar patterns to Western ones, but the pips are closer to the center of the face; in addition, the pips are differently sized on Asian style dice, and the pips are colored red on the one and four sides. The red fours may be of Indian origin.

=== Manufacturing ===
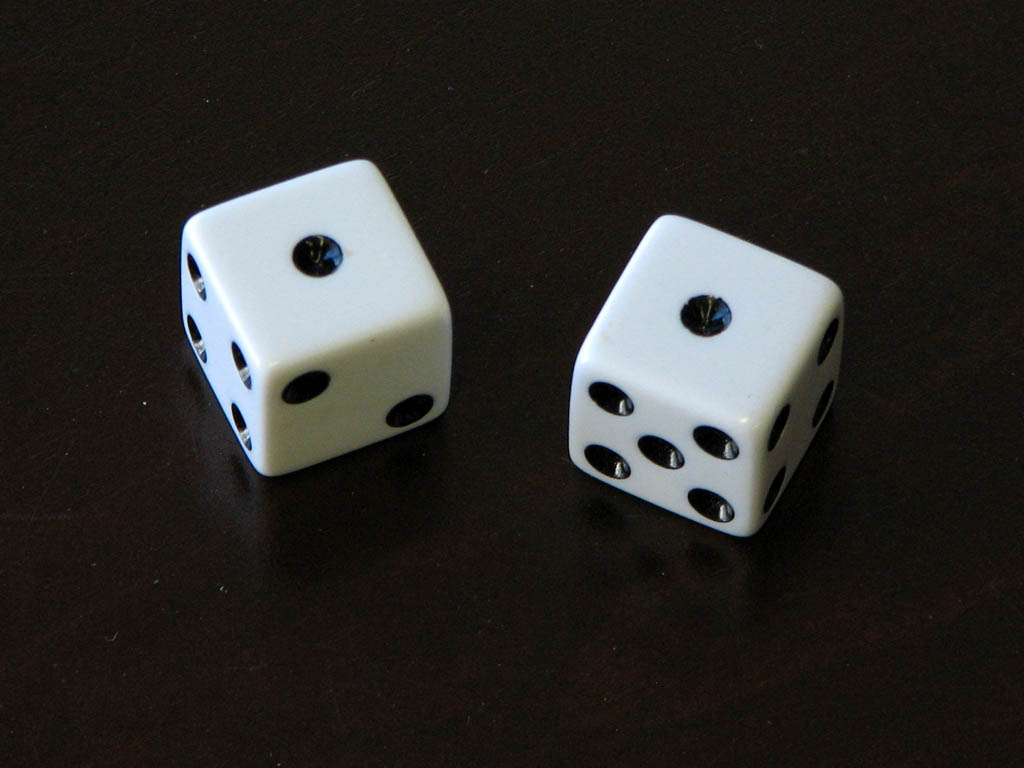
Typical western non-precision dice use opaque plastic and have recessed pips.

In general, dice are classified as either precision or non-precision. Precision dice (also known as perfect or gambling house dice) are used in casinos, while non-precision dice (also known as drugstore or candystore dice) are sold with social and board games. These types are easily distinguished with visual and tactile differences; precision dice generally are larger, translucent, and have flush markings, sharp corners and edges, while non-precision dice generally are smaller, opaque, and have recessed markings, rounded corners and edges.

Non-precision dice are manufactured via the plastic injection molding process, often made of polymethyl methacrylate (PMMA). The pips or numbers on the die are a part of the mold. Different pigments can be added to the dice to make them opaque or transparent, or multiple pigments may be added to make the dice speckled or marbled.

The coloring for numbering is achieved by submerging the die entirely in paint, which is allowed to dry. The die is then polished via a tumble finishing process similar to rock polishing. The abrasive agent scrapes off all of the paint except for the indents of the numbering. A finer abrasive is then used to polish the die. This process also produces the smoother, rounded edges on the dice.

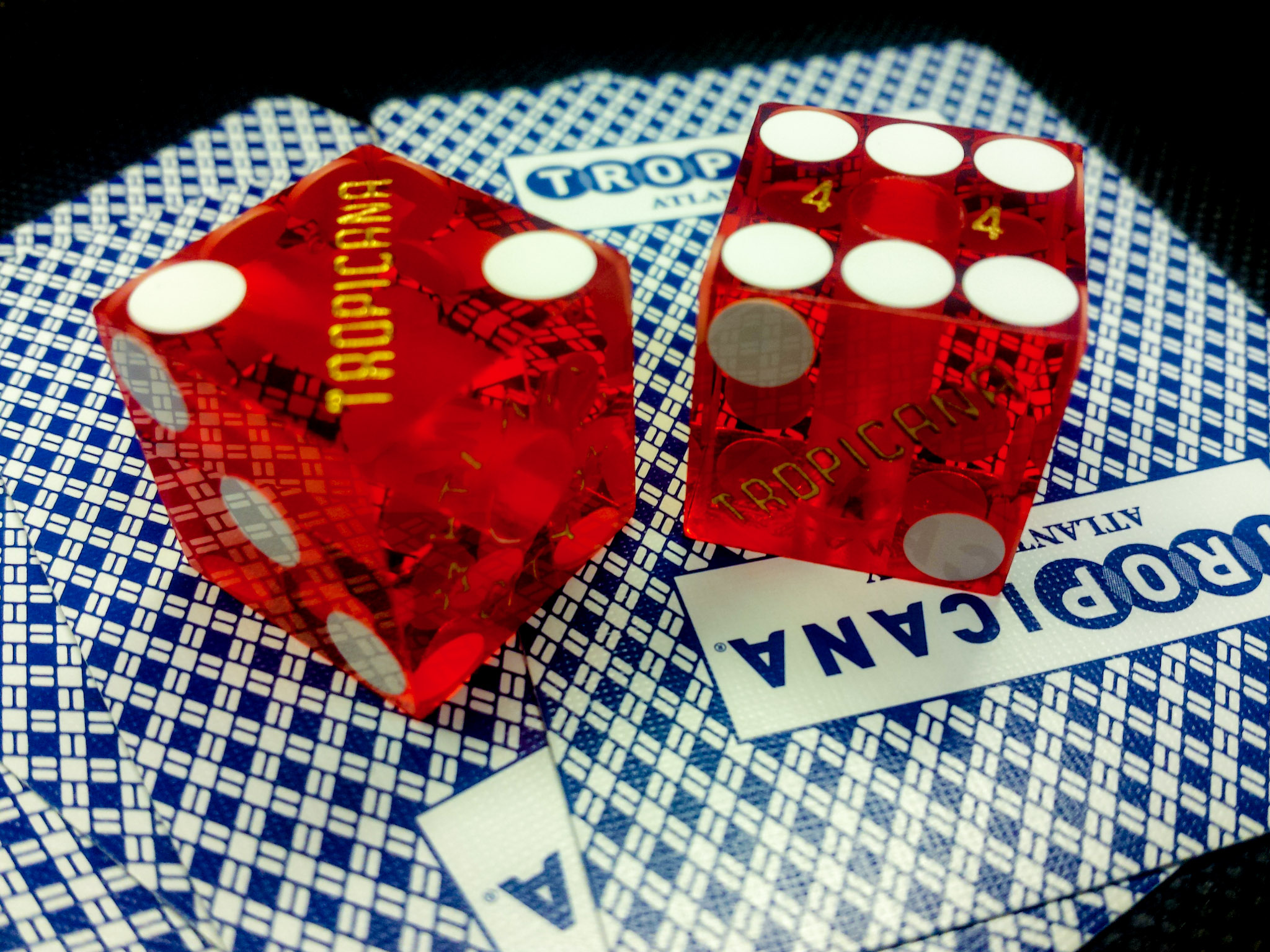
These canceled precision dice from Tropicana Atlantic City are made from translucent red cellulose acetate and flush pips.

Precision dice are generally made from bars of extruded cellulose acetate, sawed to the proper length to ensure that each face is as square as practical, generally with edges 3/4 ± 1/5000 in (19.0500 ± 0.0051 mm) in length, with pips drilled 17 ± 4 mils (0.43 ± 0.10 mm) deep and filled with opaque paint or epoxy that matches the density of cellulose, ensuring the dice remain balanced. The dice are buffed and polished to a gloss or sand finish after the pips are set, and the edges usually are left sharp, also called square or razor edge, although beveled or rounded edges, if performed evenly and consistently for each edge, are acceptable. Precision casino dice are transparent or translucent. This makes it difficult to incorporate internal weights that could bias the roll. To discourage cheating by dice substitution, each die carries a serial number and the casino's logo or name. Local regulations and the intended game may affect the allowable dimensions and tolerances; for example, New Jersey specifies the maximum size of a die is 0.775 in (19.7 mm) on a side, except for the dice used in pai gow, which range from 0.637–0.643 in (16.2–16.3 mm) on a side.

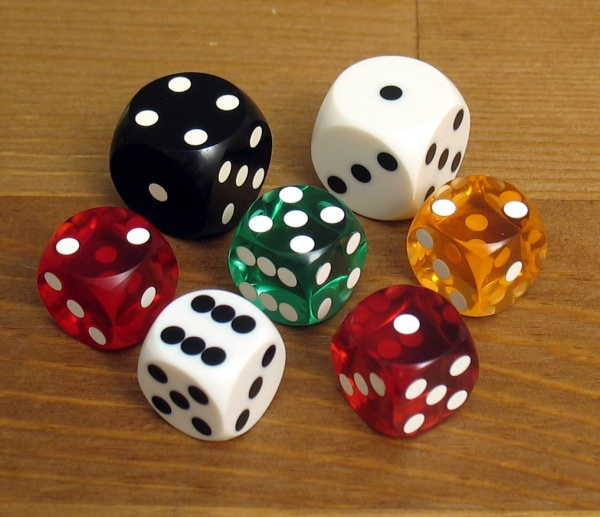
Precision backgammon dice also share the flush-pip construction, but tend to be smaller with heavily rounded corners.

Precision backgammon dice are made the same way and also feature pips flush with the surface of each face; they tend to be slightly smaller and have rounded corners and edges, to allow better movement inside the dice cup and stop forceful rolls from damaging the playing surface.

=== Unicode representation ===
Symbol	⚀	⚁	⚂	⚃	⚄	⚅	🎲
Unicode	U+2680	U+2681	U+2682	U+2683	U+2684	U+2685	U+1F3B2
Decimal	&#9856;	&#9857;	&#9858;	&#9859;	&#9860;	&#9861;	&#127922;

Using Unicode characters, the faces can be shown in text using the range U+2680 to U+2685 or using decimal &#9856; to &#9861;, and the emoji using U+1F3B2 or &#127922; from the Miscellaneous Symbols and Pictographs block.

=== Loaded dice ===
A loaded, weighted, cheat, or crooked die is one that has been tampered with so that it lands with a specific side facing upward more often or less often than a fair die would. There are several methods for making loaded dice, including rounded faces, off-square faces, and weights. Casinos and gambling halls frequently use transparent cellulose acetate dice, as tampering is easier to detect than with opaque dice.

== Variants ==
=== Polyhedral dice ===
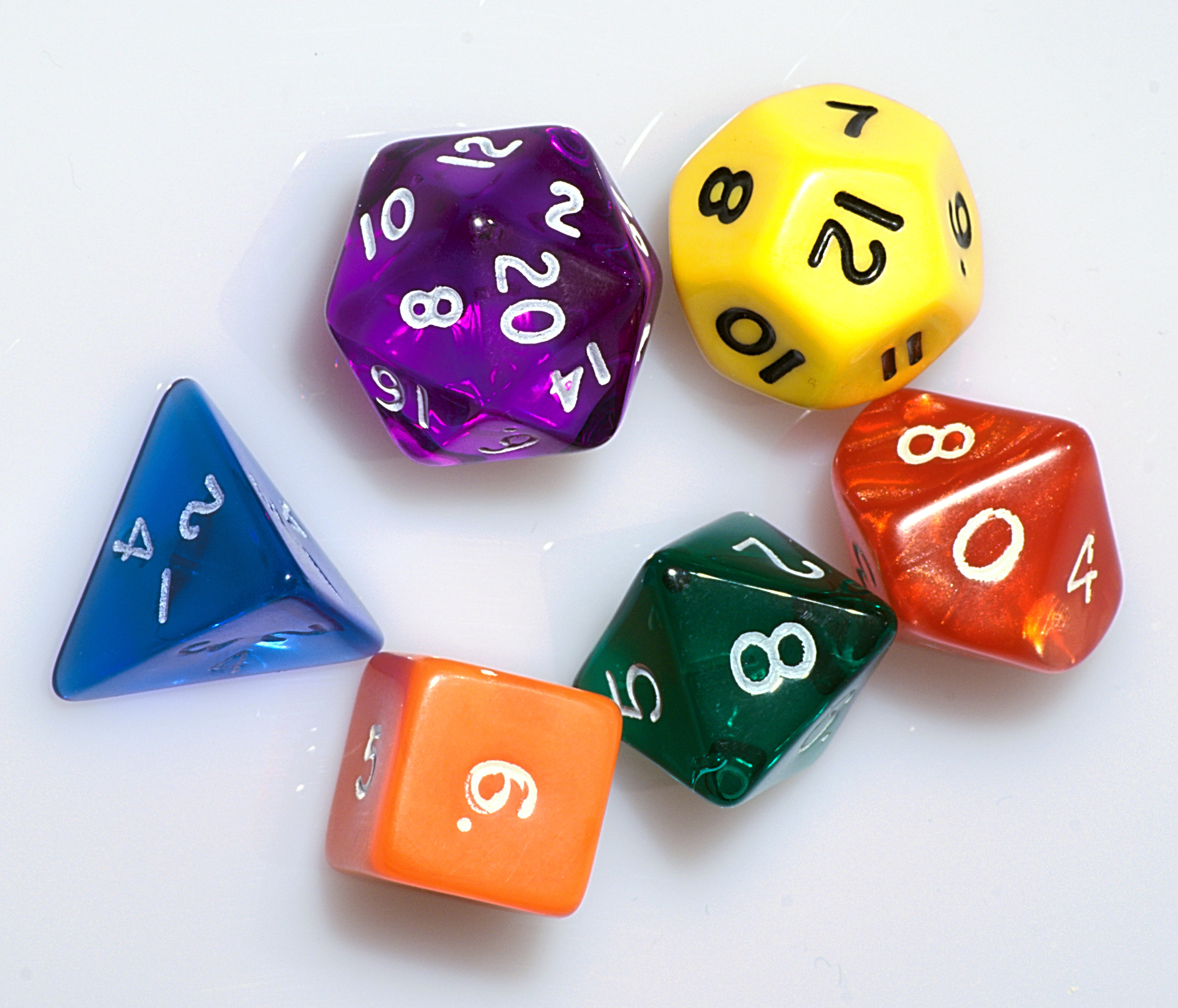
A typical set of polyhedral dice in various colors. They consist of the five Platonic solids, along with a ten-sided die that is also used for generating percentages.

Various shapes such as two-sided or four-sided dice are documented in archaeological findings; for example, from Ancient Egypt and the Middle East. While the cubical six-sided die became the most common type in many parts of the world, other shapes were always known, like 20-sided dice in Ptolemaic and Roman times.

The modern tradition of using sets of polyhedral dice started around the end of the 1960s when non-cubical dice became popular among players of wargames, and since have been employed extensively in role-playing games and trading card games. Dice using both the numerals 6 and 9, which are reciprocally symmetric through rotation, typically distinguish them with a dot or underline.

Some twenty-sided dice have a different arrangement used for the purpose of keeping track of an integer that counts down, such as health points. These spindown dice are arranged such that adjacent integers appear on adjacent faces, allowing the user to easily find the next lower number. They are commonly used with collectible card games.

==== Common variations ====
Dice are often sold in sets, matching in color, of six different shapes. Five of the dice are shaped like the Platonic solids, whose faces are regular polygons. Aside from the cube, the other four Platonic solids have 4, 8, 12, and 20 faces, allowing for those number ranges to be generated. The only other common non-cubical die is the 10-sided die, a pentagonal trapezohedron die, whose faces are ten kites, each with two different edge lengths, three different angles, and two different kinds of vertices.

Unlike other common dice, a four-sided (tetrahedral) die does not have a side that faces upward when it is at rest on a surface, so it must be read in a different way. On some four-sided dice, each face features multiple numbers, with the same number printed near each vertex on all sides. In this case, the number around the vertex pointing up is used. Alternatively, the numbers on a tetrahedral die can be placed at the middle of the edges, in which case the numbers around the base are used.

Normally, the faces on a die are placed so that opposite faces add up to one more than the number of faces. (This is not possible with 4-sided dice and dice with an odd number of faces.) Some dice, such as those with 10 sides, are usually numbered sequentially beginning with 0, in which case the opposite faces add to one less than the number of faces.

Using these dice in various ways, games can closely approximate a variety of probability distributions. The percentile dice system is used to produce a uniform distribution of random percentages, and summing the values of multiple dice produces approximations to normal distributions.

Faces/ sides	Shape		Notes
4	Tetrahedron	Tetrahedron	Each face has three numbers, arranged such that the upright number, placed either near the vertex or near the opposite edge, is the same on all three visible faces. The upright numbers represent the value of the roll.
6	Cube	Cube	The most common variation of die. The sum of the numbers on opposite faces is 7.
8	Octahedron	Octahedron	Each face is triangular and the die resembles two square pyramids attached base-to-base. Usually, the sum of the opposite faces is 9.
10	Pentagonal trapezohedron	Pentagonal trapezohedron	Each face is a kite. The die has two sharp corners, where five kites meet, and ten blunter corners, where three kites meet. Often, all odd numbered faces converge at one sharp corner, and the even ones at the other. The 10-sided die is usually numbered 0–9, though the 0 can also be read as a 10.
12	Dodecahedron	Dodecahedron	Each face is a regular pentagon. The sum of the numbers on opposite faces is usually 13.
20	Icosahedron	Icosahedron	Faces are equilateral triangles. Icosahedra have been found dating to Roman/Ptolemaic times, but it is not known if they were used as gaming dice. Modern dice with 20 sides are sometimes numbered 0–9 twice as an alternative to 10-sided dice. The sum of the numbers on opposite faces is 21 if numbered 1–20.

==== Rarer variations ====
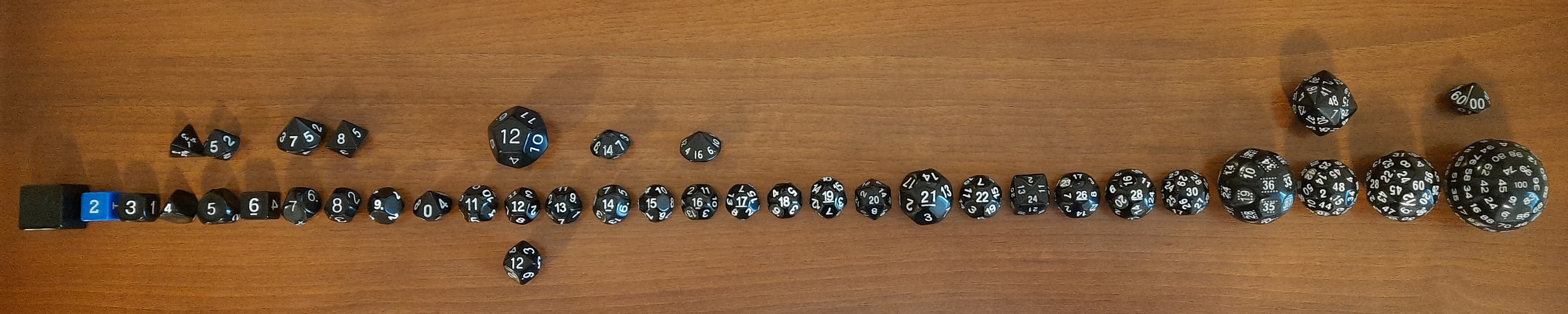
Dice collection: D2...D22, D24, D26, D28, D30, D36, D48, D50, D60 and D100

"Uniform fair dice" are dice where all faces have an equal probability of outcome due to the symmetry of the die as it is face-transitive. In addition to the Platonic solids, these theoretically include:

- Catalan solids, the duals of the 13 Archimedean solids: 12, 24, 30, 48, 60, 120 sides
- Trapezohedra, the duals of the infinite set of antiprisms, with kite faces: any even number not divisible by 4 (so that a facet faces up), starting from 6
- Bipyramids, the duals of the infinite set of prisms, with triangle faces: any multiple of 4 (so that a facet faces up), starting from 8
- Disphenoids, an infinite set of tetrahedra made from congruent non-regular triangles: 4 sides. This is a less symmetric tetrahedron than the Platonic tetrahedron but still sufficiently symmetrical to be face-transitive. Similarly, pyritohedra and tetartoids are less symmetrical but still face-transitive dodecahedra: 12 sides.

Two other types of polyhedra are technically not face-transitive but are still fair dice due to symmetry:

- antiprisms: the basis of barrel dice
- prisms: the basis of long dice and teetotums

Long dice and teetotums can, in principle, be made with any number of faces, including odd numbers. Long dice are based on the infinite set of prisms. All the rectangular faces are mutually face-transitive, so they are equally probable. The two ends of the prism may be rounded or capped with a pyramid, designed so that the die cannot rest on those faces. 4-sided long dice are easier to roll than tetrahedra and are used in the traditional board games dayakattai and daldøs.

Faces/ sides	Shape	Image	Notes
1	Möbius strip or sphere		Most commonly a joke die, this is either a sphere with a 1 marked on it or shaped like a Möbius strip. It entirely defies the aforementioned use of a die.
2	Flat cylinder or flat prism		A coin flip. Some coins with 1 marked on one side and 2 on the other are available, but most simply use a common coin. (See also Binary lot.)
3	Rounded-off triangular prism		A long die intended to be rolled lengthwise. When the die is rolled, one edge (rather than a side) appears facing upward. On either side of each edge the same number is printed (from 1 to 3). The numbers on either side of the up-facing edge are read as the result of the die roll.
4	Capped 4-sided long die		A long die intended to be rolled lengthwise. It cannot stand on end as the ends are capped.
5
5	Triangular prism		A prism thin enough to land either on its "edge" or "face". When landing on an edge, the result is displayed by digits (2–4) close to the prism's top edge - similar to a 4-sided die. The triangular faces are labeled with the digits 1 and 5.
5	Capped 5-sided long die		Five-faced long die for the Korean Game of Dignitaries; notches indicating values are cut into the edges, since in an odd-faced long die these land uppermost.
6	Capped 6-sided long die		Two six-faced long dice are used to simulate the activity of scoring runs and taking wickets in the game of cricket. Originally played with labeled six-sided pencils, and often referred to as pencil cricket.
7	Pentagonal prism		Similar in constitution to the 5-sided die. Seven-sided dice are used in a seven-player variant of backgammon. Seven-sided dice are described in the 13th century Libro de los juegos as having been invented by Alfonso X in order to speed up play in chess variants.
7	Truncated sphere		A truncated sphere with seven landing positions.
9	Truncated sphere		A truncated sphere with nine landing positions.
10	Decahedron		A ten-sided die made by truncating two opposite vertices of an octahedron.
11	Truncated sphere		A truncated sphere with eleven landing positions.
12	Rhombic dodecahedron		Each face is a rhombus.
13	Truncated sphere		A truncated sphere with thirteen landing positions.
14	Heptagonal trapezohedron		Each face is a kite.
14	Truncated octahedron		A truncated octahedron. Each face is either a square or a hexagon.
14	Truncated sphere		A truncated sphere with fourteen landing positions. The design is based on the cuboctahedron.
15	Truncated sphere		A truncated sphere with fifteen landing positions.
16	Octagonal bipyramid		Each face is an isosceles triangle.
17	Truncated sphere		A truncated sphere with seventeen landing positions.
18	Rounded rhombicuboctahedron		Eighteen faces are squares. The eight triangular faces are rounded and cannot be landed on.
19	Truncated sphere		A truncated sphere with nineteen landing positions.
21	Truncated sphere		A truncated sphere with twenty-one landing positions.
22	Truncated sphere		A truncated sphere with twenty-two landing positions.
23	Truncated sphere		A truncated sphere with twenty-three landing positions.
24	Triakis octahedron		Each face is an isosceles triangle.
24	Tetrakis hexahedron		Each face is an isosceles triangle.
24	Deltoidal icositetrahedron		Each face is a kite.
24	Pseudo-deltoidal icositetrahedron		Each face is a kite.
24	Pentagonal icositetrahedron		Each face is an irregular pentagon.
25	Truncated sphere		A truncated sphere with twenty-five landing positions.
26	Truncated sphere		A truncated sphere with twenty-six landing positions.
27	Truncated sphere	A truncated Sphere.	A truncated sphere with twenty-seven landing positions.
28	Truncated sphere		A truncated sphere with twenty-eight landing positions.
30	Rhombic triacontahedron		Each face is a rhombus.
32	Truncated sphere		A truncated sphere with thirty-two landing positions. The design is similar to that of a truncated icosahedron.
34	Heptadecagonal trapezohedron		Each face is a kite.
36	Truncated sphere		A truncated sphere with thirty-six landing positions. Rows of spots are present above and below each number 1 through 36 so that this die can be used to roll two six-sided dice simultaneously.
48	Disdyakis dodecahedron		Each face is a scalene triangle.
50	Icosipentagonal trapezohedron		Each face is a kite.
60	Deltoidal hexecontahedron		Each face is a kite.
60	Pentakis dodecahedron		Each face is an isosceles triangle.
60	Pentagonal hexecontahedron		Each face is an irregular pentagon.
60	Triakis icosahedron		Each face is an isosceles triangle.
100	Zocchihedron		A sphere containing another sphere with 100 facets flattened into it. Note that this design is not isohedral; it does not function as a uniform fair die as some results are more likely than others.
120	Disdyakis triacontahedron		Each face is a scalene triangle.

=== Non-numeric dice ===
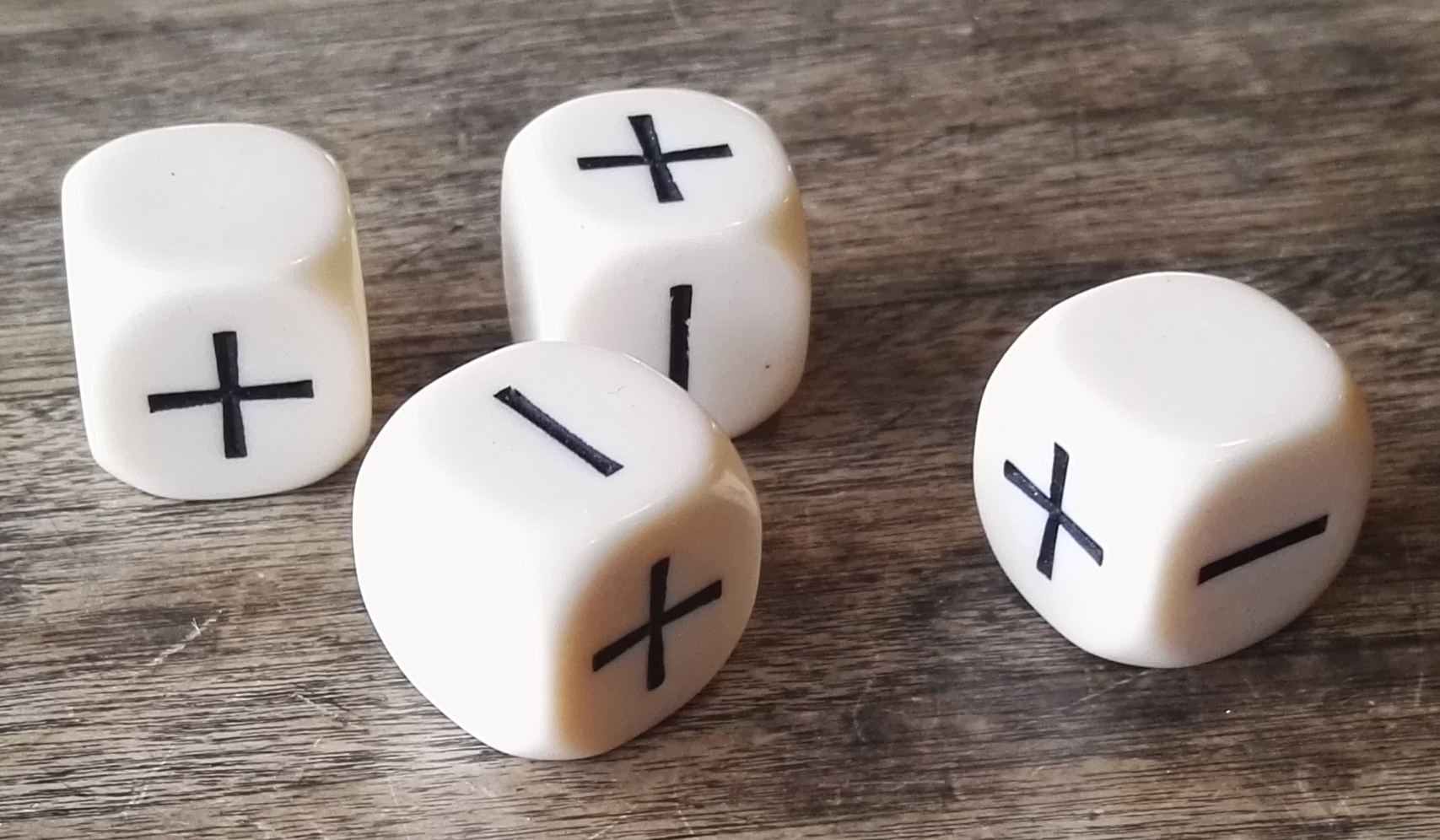
A set of Fudge dice

The faces of most dice are labelled using sequences of whole numbers, usually starting at one, expressed with either pips or digits. However, there are some applications that require results other than numbers. Examples include letters for Boggle, directions for Warhammer, Fudge dice, playing card symbols for poker dice, and instructions for sexual acts using sex dice.

=== Alternatively-numbered dice ===
Dice may have numbers that do not form a counting sequence starting at one. One variation on the standard die is known as the "average" die. These are six-sided dice with sides numbered 2, 3, 3, 4, 4, and 5, which have the same arithmetic mean as a standard die (3.5 for a single die, 7 for a pair of dice), but have a narrower range of possible values (2 through 5 for one, 4 through 10 for a pair). They are used in some table-top wargames, where a narrower range of numbers is required. Other numbered variations include Sicherman dice and intransitive dice.

=== Spherical dice ===
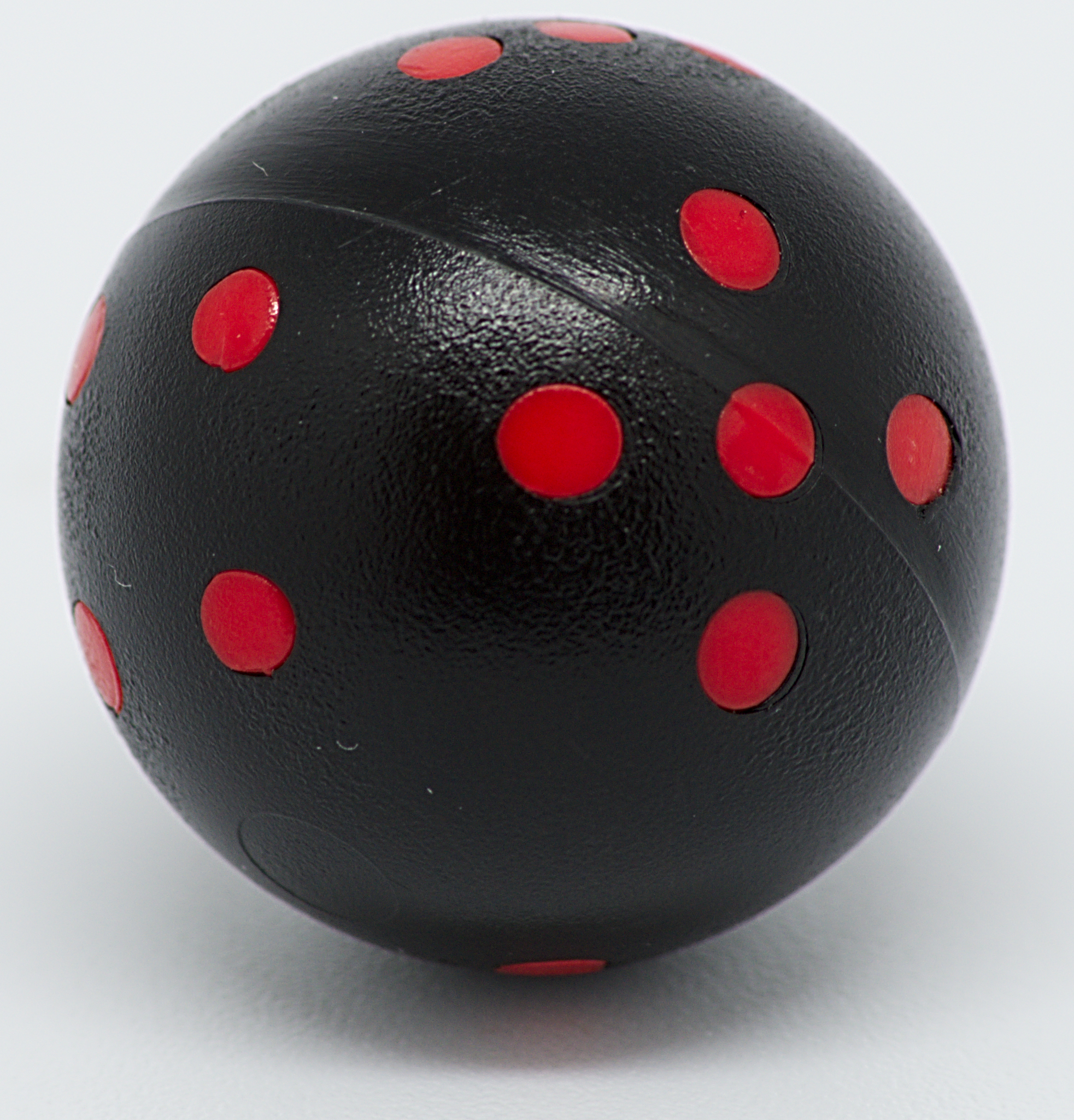
A spherical die

A die can be constructed in the shape of a sphere, with the addition of an internal cavity in the shape of the dual polyhedron of the desired die shape and an internal weight. The weight settles into one of the points of the internal cavity, causing it to settle with one of the numbers uppermost. For instance, a sphere with an octahedral cavity and a small internal weight settles with one of the 6 points of the cavity held downward by the weight.

== Applications ==
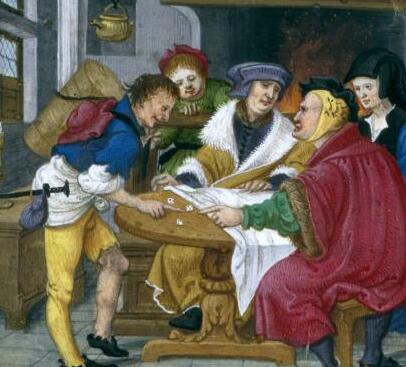
Playing Dice by Master Jean de Mauléon (c. 1520)

One typical contemporary dice game is craps, where two dice are thrown simultaneously and wagers are made on the total value of the two dice. Dice are frequently used to introduce randomness into board games, where they are often used to decide the distance through which a piece can move along the board (as in backgammon and Monopoly).

Many board games use dice to randomize how far pieces move or to settle conflicts. Typically, this has meant that rolling higher numbers is better. Some games, such as Axis & Allies, have inverted this system by making the lower values more potent. In the modern age, a few games and game designers have approached dice in a different way by making each side of the die similarly valuable. In Castles of Burgundy, players spend their dice to take actions based on the die's value. In this game, a 6 is not better than a 1, or vice versa. In Quarriors (and its descendant, Dice Masters), different sides of the dice can offer completely different abilities. Several sides often give resources while others grant the player useful actions.

Dice can be used for divination and using dice for such a purpose is called cleromancy. A pair of common dice is usual, though other forms of polyhedra can be used. Tibetan Buddhists sometimes use this method of divination. It is highly likely that the Pythagoreans used the Platonic solids as dice. They referred to such dice as "the dice of the gods" and they sought to understand the universe through an understanding of geometry in polyhedra.

Astrological dice are a specialized set of three 12-sided dice for divination; the first die represents the planets, the Sun, the Moon, and the nodes of the Moon, the second die represents the 12 zodiac signs, and the third represents the 12 houses. A specialized icosahedron die provides the answers of the Magic 8 Ball, conventionally used to provide answers to yes-or-no questions.

Dice can be used to generate random numbers for use in passwords and cryptography applications. The Electronic Frontier Foundation describes a method by which dice can be used to generate passphrases. Diceware is a method recommended for generating secure but memorable passphrases, by repeatedly rolling five dice and picking the corresponding word from a pre-generated list.

Thrown or simulated dice are sometimes used to generate specific probability distributions, which are fundamental to probability theory. For example, rolling a single six-sided die yields a uniform distribution, where each face from 1 to 6 has an equal chance of appearing. However, when rolling two dice and summing the results, the probability distribution shifts, as some sums (like 7) become more likely than others (like 2 or 12). These distributions can model real-world scenarios or mathematical constructs, making dice a practical tool for teaching and exploring concepts in probability theory.

=== Notation ===
In many gaming contexts, especially tabletop role-playing games, shorthand notations are used to differentiate between different types of dice. The most commonly used notation, considered the standard, is written as nds. In this expression, s is the number of sides on each die, while n is the number of dice to be rolled and added together; when only a single die is called for, the n is customarily omitted. As an illustration, the d20 (twenty-sided die) is to Dungeons & Dragons what the d6 (six-sided die) is to many board games. Monopoly uses 2d6 rolls (the total value of two six-sided dice) to determine player movement.

The notation also allows for adding or subtracting a constant amount c to the roll. When an amount is added, the notation is nds+c. For example, "3d6+4" instructs the player to roll three six-sided dice, calculate the total, and add four to it. When an amount is to be subtracted, the notation is nds−c. Thus, "3d6−4" instructs the player to subtract four from the total value of three six-sided dice. The notation nds−L is also sometimes used, with the modifier "L" (or less commonly "H") representing the lowest amount (or highest amount) of each roll combined. For instance, 4d6−L instructs the player to sum up the total of four six-sided dice and subtract the lowest value. If the result of a modified dice roll is negative, it is often taken to be zero or one; for instance, when the dice roll determines the amount of damage to a creature.

=== Role-playing dice sets and percentile dice ===
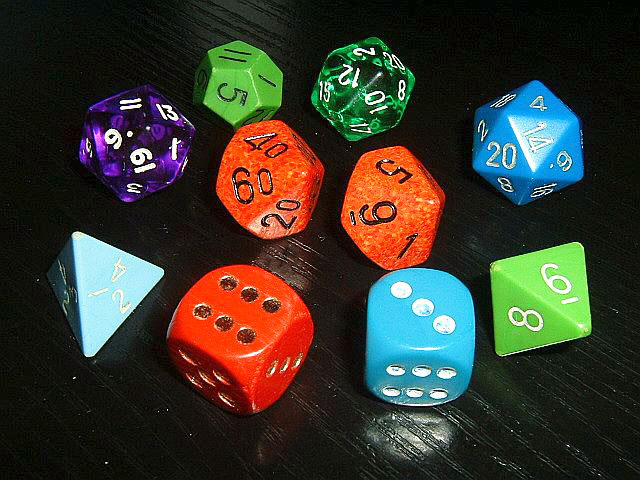
Typical role-playing dice, showing a variety of colors and styles. Note the older hand-inked green 12-sided die (showing an 11), manufactured before pre-inked dice were common. Many players collect or acquire a large number of mixed and unmatching dice.

Polyhedral dice are commonly used in role-playing games. The fantasy role-playing game Dungeons & Dragons (D&D) is largely credited with popularizing dice in such games. Some games use only one type, like Exalted, which uses only ten-sided dice. Others use numerous types for different game purposes, such as D&D, which makes use of all common polyhedral dice. Dice are usually used to determine the outcome of events. Games typically determine results either as a total on one or more dice above or below a fixed number, or a certain number of rolls above a certain number on one or more dice. Due to circumstances or character skill, the initial roll may have a number added to or subtracted from the final result, or have the player roll extra or fewer dice. To keep track of rolls easily, dice notation is frequently used.

A role-playing dice set typically comprises seven dice: one each of d4, d6, d8, d12 and d20, and two d10s, one labeled from 0 to 9 and the other labeled in tens from 00 to 90. These last two, taken together, are called percentile dice. In standard dice notation, a roll of percentile dice can be expressed as "d100", although "d%" is also seen. A d100 roll is typically performed like a 2d10 roll, using both decahedral dice together. Adding the numbers shown gives a random number from 0 to 99 – although 0+00 is typically read as 100, for consistency with other dice notation.

The zocchihedron was invented as an alternative to percentile dice. Unlike percentile dice, the zocchihedron is a true d100 die, though no single die of 100 sides can be as consistently fair.

== See also ==
- Astragalomancy – Form of divination
- Crown and Anchor – Dice game
- d20 System – Role-playing game system
- Dice pool – Role-playing game mechanic
- Dreidel – Four-sided spinning top used on Hanukkah
- Fuzzy dice – Automobile decoration
- Musikalisches Würfelspiel – Musical dice games used to randomly generate music
- Die throw (review) – Method of review often used in Norway
- Intransitive dice – Game variations and descriptions of intransitive dice and their behaviour
- Quincunx – Pattern of five points, four in a square or rectangle and a fifth at its center
- Random number generation – Creating a sequence of numbers that cannot be predicted
- Teetotum – Spinning lot, generating random outcomes
- Urim and Thummim – Objects used for divination in the early Abrahamic religions
