= Sex dice =

Dice game encouraging sexual activities

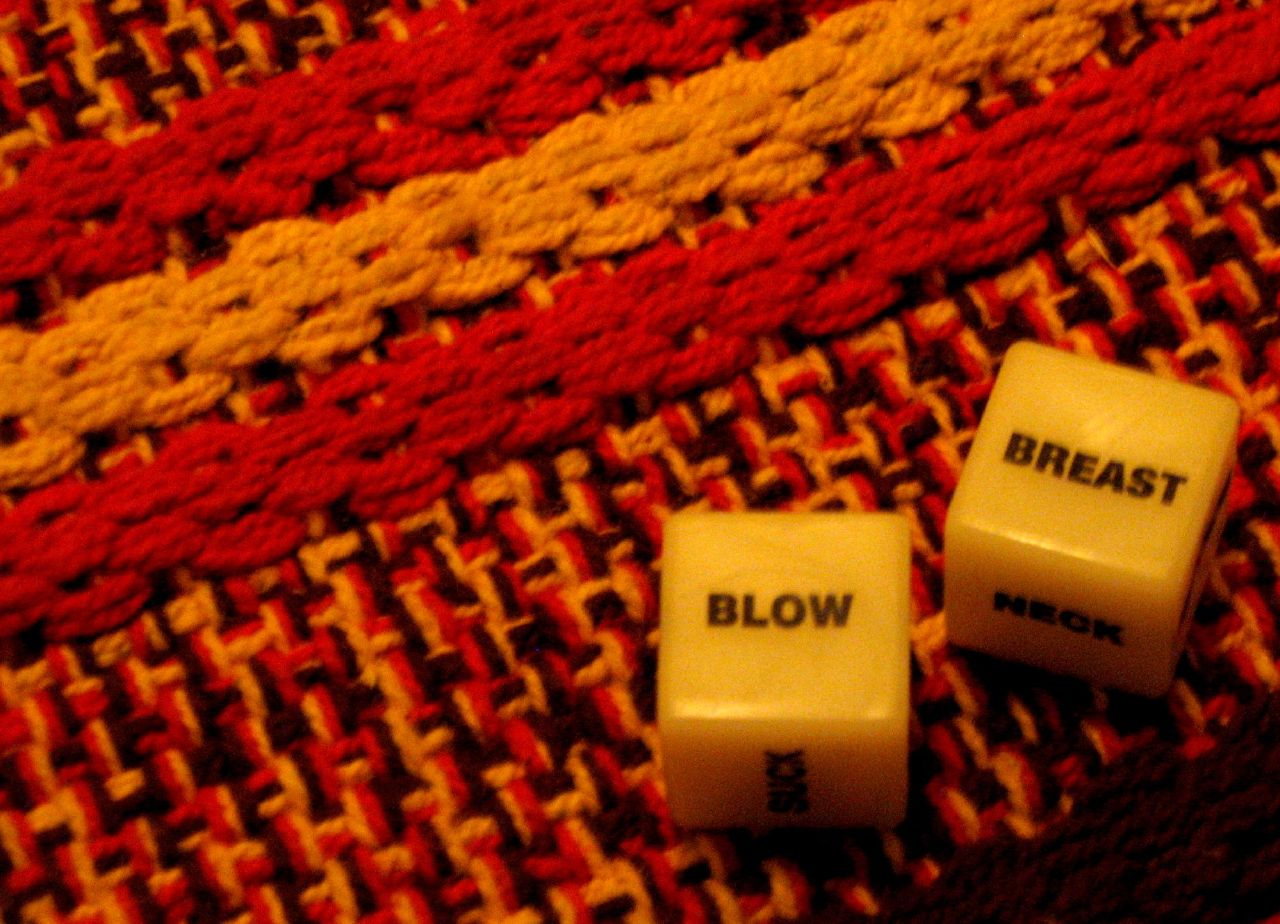
Following the game rules, this roll would instruct a player to "blow" a stream of air upon their partner's "breast".

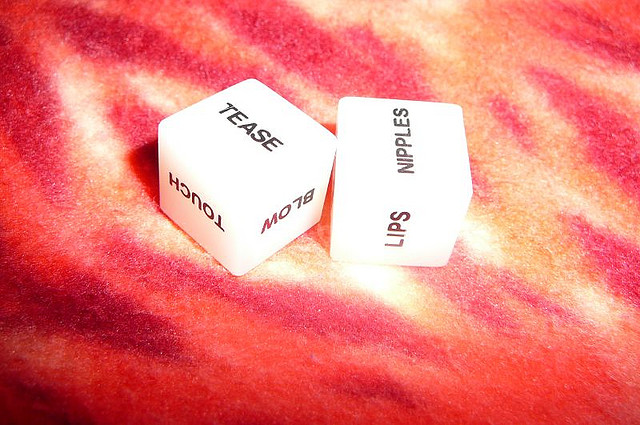
Sex dice showing "Tease Nipples"

Sex dice is a dice game intended to heighten the sexual atmosphere and promote foreplay. Instead of numbers, each face on the dice contains the name of a body part; the body part that faces up when the die is rolled must then be given sexual attention.

== History ==
According to a 1999 SPIN magazine article, the game was especially popular among American teenagers.

In 2020 dice were controversially featured in a tool kit distributed to secondary school students by an LGBT charity in the United Kingdom.

== Reviews ==
The Daily Princetonian suggests rolling sex dice to "break the ice and extend [one's] foreplay." The University Daily Kansan advises a roll of the sex dice for those who are not particularly limber (and therefore cannot try "new and inventive position[s]") as a means to "bring variety to [one's] bedroom romps."

A commercially available version, also called Foreplay Dice, consists of two dice, one with body parts and the other with activities; a roll of the dice will determine which action is to be applied to which body part.
