= Luftwaffe (board wargame) =

WW2 strategic air combat wargame

Cover art by Charles Harbaugh, 1971

Luftwaffe, subtitled "The Game of Aerial Combat Over Germany 1943-45", is a board wargame originally published by Poultron Press in 1969 under a different title, then subsequently sold to Avalon Hill, who republished it in 1971. The game is an operational simulation of the American bombing campaign against Germany during World War II.

== Description ==
Luftwaffe is a two-player operational wargame in which one player controls American bomber and fighter groups, and the other controls German air defenses.

=== Components ===
The game box includes:

- 22" x 24" mounted hex grid map scaled at 20 mi (32 km) per hex
- 180 die-cut counters
- rulebook
- historical analysis book
- various charts and player aids
- six-sided die
- pad of target selection forms

=== Gameplay ===
The Basic game (twenty turns) represents one air raid, and is designed to teach the game. Once players are familiar with the game, the Advanced and Tournament rules require up to ten separate raids representing a three-month bombing campaign, as well as more rules for increased realism.

== Publication history ==
In the late 1960s, Avalon Hill dominated the board wargame market, producing on average, one game per year with well-produced but expensive components. At the newly founded wargame publisher Poultroon Press (later Simulations Publications Inc.), Jim Dunnigan and his design team decided to go in the opposite direction, marketing a number of very cheaply made "test games" to prove that producing many games a year could also be a viable business model. These test games featured typewritten pages with hand-drawn maps and graphics and thin paper counter sheets, packaged in a plain manila envelope. The sixteenth game in this "Test Series" was a strategic bombing game designed by Lou Zocchi and titled Twelve O'Clock High. Shortly after it was published by Poultroon in 1969, Avalon Hill purchased the rights to the game. Retitled Luftwaffe: The Game of Aerial Combat Over Germany 1943-45, the game was repackaged as a boxed set with upgraded components and attractive cover art by Charles Harbaugh. It was released in 1971, and a second edition with some rules revisions was released the following year.

The game proved to be a reliable seller over the next decade. According the Avalon Hill's company history, written in 1980, "Although it never really stood the hobby on its ear in the manner of a Panzerblitz [a popular Avalon Hill game], it remains a consistently good seller to this day — testimony to the importance of a dynamic title and box cover."

After the demise of Avalon Hill, Decision Games acquired the rights to the game and Joseph Miranda revised the rules. The new edition, titled Luftwaffe: Aerial Combat – Germany 1943-45, was released in 2007 with artwork by Nicolás Eskubi and Joe Youst.

== Reception ==
In Issue 3 of the UK magazine Games & Puzzles, (July 1972), game designer Don Turnbull called it "a much needed air campaign game." He admitted that "Some players say the game is too long, others that it is too simple; however the majority, according to my investigations, praise it." Several issues later, Turnbull warned players about the game's length, saying, "The Tournament version consists of 10 quarters, each consisting of 20 turns. It cannot, therefore, be played in one evening, or even two or three."

In A Player's Guide to Table Games, John Jackson noted that "The Allies have an advantage even in the short version of Luftwaffe, and to stop them, the Germans must hit the bomber formations hard and often." Jackson found the Combat Results Table (CRT) "too unpredictable", and proposed a revision that used two six-sided dice to produce a bell curve of probabilities.

In a 1976 poll conducted by Avalon Hill to determine its most popular games, Luftwaffe placed 12th out of 25 games.

In his 1977 book The Comprehensive Guide to Board Wargaming, Nicholas Palmer noted that "This attractively packaged game is unusual in that it features the American strategic air war against Germany, whereas most air games are tactical." Palmer warned the German player that "The major constraint on all fighters is fuel, and some of the best defending aircraft need constant landings for re-tanking." He concluded that "Play balance is doubtful, with an apparent Allied edge in several versions, but using the right optional rules can cure this."

In the 1980 book The Complete Book of Wargames, game designer Jon Freeman commented, "Luftwaffe is the best game of its kind; it's also very nearly the only game of its kind." He noted that the game had issues, saying, "Aside from being somewhat unbalanced, the game's biggest flaws concern realism." Freeman gave this game an Overall Evaluation of "Good", concluding, "Despite such quibbles, it's a playable and challenging game."

Wargame Academy felt that "The abstracted nature of combat, damage, and time detracted from long time appeal." The Academy also questioned game balance, suggesting that "The 20 turn basic game is favored to the Germans and is best played with two sequential games playing each side with the player successfully bombing the greater number of targets."

In The Guide to Simulations/Games for Education and Training, Martin Campion pointed out that "Luftwaffe contains some doubtful historical information — that bombing aircraft factories was highly effective, for example."

== Other recognition ==
Copies of Luftwaffe are held in the collections of:

- the Strong National Museum of Play (object 112.6956).
- the Imperial War Museum (object EPH 2944).

== Other reviews and commentary ==
- Battleplan #2
- Fire & Movement #72
- Jeux & Stratégie #10
- Games & Puzzles #56
- The Playboy Winner's Guide to Board Games
