= Gamescience =

American game company

- Type: Private
- Industry: Game publisher, game supplies
- Predecessor: Gamescience Corp.
- Founded: 1974; 52 years ago
- Founder: Lou Zocchi
- Headquarters: Bardstown, KY, United States
- Website: gamescience.com

Gamescience is an American game company that produces role-playing games and game supplements.

== History ==
Gamescience Corp. was started by Phillip E. Orbanes in 1965. In that year, the company published the wargame Vietnam which was reviewed in issue #4 of Strategy and Tactics (S&T) magazine. In 1967 the company published another wargame which Orbanes designed called Confrontation, which was reviewed in S&T issue #6. In 1968, the company published the wargame, The Battle of Britain designed by Lou Zocchi, which was reviewed in S&T #13. The company was sold before Orbanes left college.

Gamescience was founded by Lou Zocchi.

Gamescience published the board game The Battle of Britain (1968), the wargames MiG Killers (1977), and Strike Team Alpha (1978), and the role-playing games Star Patrol (1977; originally called Space Patrol), Superhero: 2044 (1977), the second edition of Empire of the Petal Throne (1984), and TWERPS (1987).

Gamescience also produces dice, including several types of nonstandard dice.
