= List of systemless fantasy role-playing game supplements =

This is a list of tabletop fantasy role-playing game supplements published by various companies. Many of these books were unlicensed publications intended to be used with Dungeons & Dragons or other game systems, and many were designed to be "generic" or "universal", or to be adapted to any fantasy role-playing game system. This list is organized by publisher.

== Game supplements by publisher ==
=== Adventurer's Guild ===
- Adventurer's Guild Bestiary (1987)
- Adventurer's Guild Sage's Tome (1987)
- Adventurer's Guild Tome (1987)
- Adventurer's Guild Bounty Hunters' Handbook (1988)

=== American Games ===
- The Proportional Combat System (1987)

=== Angstrum ===
- The Spells of Aldernon (1988)
- More Spells from Aldernon

=== Attack International Wargaming ===
- The Infernax of Spells, Necromancy, and Black Magic (1978)
- Tower of Elbrith (1979)

=== Attack Wargaming Company ===
- Thieve's Quarter (1980)

=== Bad Dog Publications ===
- Fluffy Quest (1984)

=== Balboa Games ===
- Instant Bad Guys (1977)
- The Complete Warlock (1978)
- The Monkey God's Curse (1979)
- Warlock's Tower (1979)
- The Warlock Menagerie (1980)

=== Bard Games ===
Bard Games published:

- The Compleat Adventurer (1983)
- The Compleat Alchemist (1983)
- The Compleat Spell Caster (1983)

=== Bearhug Publications ===
- The Compleat Trove (1979)

=== Calypso Systems Inc ===
- Evil-Colored Green (1986)
- The Temple of Cheelaka (1986)
- Society of the Green (1987)

=== Canadex Games ===
- Player Character Records (1981)

=== Chaosium ===
Edited by Steve Perrin and Jeff Pimper, All the Worlds' Monsters is a fantasy game supplement that lists many monsters from the campaigns of Dungeon Masters across the US, none of which had been published for Dungeons & Dragons (D&D) before and most of which were original creations. There are three volumes, and the first volume predates the 1977 Advanced Dungeons & Dragons Monster Manual by several months.

They also published Authentic Thaumaturgy (1978), and the Thieves' World supplement in 1981 with the Thieves' World Companion in 1986.

=== Chaotic Intellect Products ===
- No Honour in Sathporte (1983)

=== The Companions ===
Cover of Fantasy Furnishings

- Companion Pieces: Fantasy Furnishing (1982): A set of black and white stickers illustrating pieces of furniture and other items commonly found in fantasy role-playing game settings, designed to be used with miniature figurines and floor plans commonly used in games of the time. Lewis Pulsipher from The Space Gamer questioned the need for these stickers, saying, "They are, of course, better than nothing for adding precision and a visual aspect to your descriptions and battle set-ups; but, on the other hand, a decent amateur artist could produce usable drawings nearly as aesthetically pleasing as these." Pulsipher concluded, "This kind of thing is certainly not necessary to fantasy gaming, but it is competently produced for those who value the idea."
- The Curse on Hareth (1982)
- Brotherhood of the Bolt (1983)
- Gems for Death (1983)
- Places of Mystery I - Chilling Chambers (1983)
- Places of Mystery II - Alluring Alcoves (1983)
- Places of Mystery III - Sylvan Settings (1983)
- Plague of Terror (1983)
- Streets of Gems (1983)
- Treasure Troves I - Cards of Power (1983)
- Places of Mystery IV - Highroad (1984)
- Sacrifices to the Orc Lord (1984)

=== Conflict Simulations of Australia ===
- Bad Moon (1987)

=== Creations Unlimited ===
According to Shannon Appelcline, although the adventures of the Maze of Zayene series "were unforgiving 'gauntlets' of the type that Kuntz enjoyed, they were somewhat unusual for the time because they had a political veneer laid out upon them – centering on a plot to assassinate a king. They also feature the evil wizard Zayene, who Kuntz intended to be a recurring villain, constantly returning to bedevil players." The adventures were all published in 1987 and included Prisoners of the Maze, Dimensions of Flight, Tower Chaos, and The Eight Kings.

Creations Unlimited also published:

- City of Brass (1987)
- Garden of the Plantmaster (1987)

=== Days of Yore ===
- Hexpressions, released in 1981, provides a large rubber stamp patterned with seven hex shapes, each one 5/8ths of an inch across, intended as a tool to create "instant" hex maps as role-playing aids. Reviewer Steve Jackson commented that the stamp produced "sloppy-looking maps" but provided versatility through the use of different colors, concluding: "An interesting gimmick! The stamp itself is well made and looks as though it will last a long time. I'll leave it to you whether you need it."

=== Daystar West Media Productions ===
DayStar West Media published:

- Rahasia (1979)
- Pharaoh (1980)

=== Del Enterprises ===
- The F.R.P. Character Card (1979)

=== Dimension Six ===
- Character Record Sheets (1980)
- The Compleat Fantasist (1980)
- The Dungeon (1980)
- Furioso (1980)
- Mountain of Mystery (1980)
- The Temple to Athena (1980)
- Nine Doctrines of Darkness (1981)
- Town of Jourdan (1981)

=== Dragon Tree Press ===
- The Dragon Tree Spell Book (1981)
- The Handbook of Traps and Tricks (1981)
- Monster File Number One (1981)
- Stones of the Selt (1981)
- Amazon Mutual Wants You!: Volume One (1982)
- Book of Artifacts (1982)
- The Book of Plots 1 (1982)
- Desert Plots: Amazon Mutual 2 (1983)
- The Delian Book of the Dead (1986)
- The Monsterous Civilizations of Delos (1986)
- Beyond the Sacred Table (1987)

=== DunDraCon Inc ===
DunDraCon published

- City Modules (1978)
- Referee Map Modules: Set No. 1 (1978)
- Artifact Cards Set No. 1 (1979).

=== Dungeon Quest Publications ===
- Domain of Xantree (1989)
- Six Gems of Xantree (1989)

=== Entertainment Concepts Inc ===
- Bavenlon, Danger in the Dark Forest (1983)
- High Ranger Guard (1983)
- Long Live the King (1983)
- The Mystery of Wizard's Island (1983)
- The Plateau: Capital of Evil (1983)
- Search for the Crystal Sword (1983)
- Search for the Lost City (1983)
- Society of Sorcery (1983)
- The Village of Peddler's Ferry (1983)
- The World of Silverdawn (1983)

=== Fantasy Art Enterprises ===
- Booty and the Beasts (1979)
- Geomorphic Mini Dungeon Modules (1979)
- The Necromican (1979)
- New Magical and Technological Items Cards (1979)

=== Fantasy Enterprises ===
- The Book of Treasure (1980)

=== Fantasy Factory ===
- Overland Encounters, First Through Fourth Levels (1979)
- Overland Encounters, Fifth Through Eight Levels (1979)
- Underground Encounters, First Through Fourth Levels (1979)
- Deepdelve (1980)
- Catapult Run was published by Canadian publisher Fantasy Factory in 1984.

=== Fantasy Unlimited ===
- Mountain Rain Tribe (1983)
- The American Indian (1983)

=== Far Reaches ===
- Roshia's Gauntlet (Code of the Rats) (1991)

=== FASA Corp ===
FASA published:

- The Blue Camel (1982)
- Traitor (1982)
- The Spirit Stones (1983)
- Dark Assassin (1984)

=== Flying Buffalo ===
Blade/Flying Buffalo began publishing the "Catalyst" series of fantasy role-playing game supplements in 1981 with Grimtooth's Traps.

=== Fugitive Games ===
- Creature Creation (1986)

=== Gamelords ===
Gamelords published:

- The Compleat Tavern (1981).
- The Phantastical Phantasmagorical Montie Haul Dungeon (1982)

=== Gamemaster Guides ===
- Heaven and Hell (1982)

=== Games Publications ===
- The Solo Dungeon (1978)

=== Games Workshop ===
British company Games Workshop published play aids including the pad of Character Sheets (1978), Hex Sheets (1978), and Dungeon Floor Plans (1979).

Games Workshop also published:

- Caverns of the Dead: Dungeon Planner Set 1 (1984)
- Nightmare in Blackmarsh: Dungeon Planner Set 2 (1984)
- In Search of New Gods (1986)
- The Awakening (1986)
- Rod of Seraillian (1987).

=== Gamescience ===
Gamescience published:

- The Book of Monsters (1978, 2nd edition)
- Fantasy Adventurer Character Sheets (1980)
- Fantasy Gamer's Compendium (1983)

=== Gargoyles & Gorgons ===
- The Piracy of Su Fang Choi (1983)

=== Genesis Gaming Products ===
- The Tavern (1983)

=== Grenadier Models ===
Grenadier Models published Cloudland (1984).

=== Group One Games ===
- Ironhoof Highlands (1981)

=== Horizon International ===
- Island Campaign (1983)
- Witchery in Elcaro (1983)

=== Icarus Games ===
- The Quest (1984)

=== Infinity Limited ===
- The Black Vial (1982)
- The Dungeon of King Lout (1982)

=== Integrated Games ===
- The Halls of the Dwarven Kings (1984)
- The Lost Shrine of Kasar-Khan (1985)
- The Watchers of the Sacred Flame (1986)
- The Feathered Priests (1986)

=== International Dungeon Designs Ltd ===
- Escape from the Minotaur's Lair (1981)

=== International Gamers Association ===
- Manual of Aurania (1977)
- Wizard's Aide (1977)

=== Judges Guild ===
Judges Guild was founded by co-founder Bob Bledsaw, along with partner Bill Owen, who travelled to Lake Geneva, Wisconsin to visit the headquarters of Tactical Studies Rules (TSR), publishers of Dungeons & Dragons, on July 17, 1976. Bledsaw and Owen had hoped to convince TSR to publish some of the materials they used in their D&D campaigns, as well as Owen's rules for a game set during the American Civil War. While at TSR, they met with D&D co-creator Dave Arneson, who gave Bledsaw and Owen verbal approval to produce some supplemental game materials (known as "play aids") for both Dungeons & Dragons and Advanced Dungeons & Dragons (AD&D). At that time, TSR's only published play aids for D&D were the Dungeon Geomorphs, and the general feeling at TSR was that no one would be interested in supplemental materials.

=== Labyrinth Games ===
- The Imliv River Valley (1983)

=== Little Soldier Games ===
Little Soldier Games published:

- The Book of Demons (1976)
- The Book of Monsters (1976)
- The Book of Sorcery (1977)

=== Loremasters ===
- The Book of Swords and Other Magical Weapons (1982)
- Character Cards (1982)
- Character Chronicles (1982)
- Citadel of Dragonkind (1982)
- City of Whiteford (1982)
- Temple of the Bizucar (1982)
- Abode of the Aesir (1983)

=== Mallama Press ===
- Critter Fantastical (1977)

=== Martian Game Modules ===
- T.H.E. Non-Player Character (1978)
- T.H.E. Fighter (1979)

=== Master's Lab ===
- Character Data Sheet (1980)
- Experience Record Sheet (1980)
- Last Will and Testament (1980)
- Magical Items and Spell Data Sheet (1980)
- Melee/Time Sheet (1980)
- Passport (1980)

=== Mayfair Games ===
As a veteran role-playing gamer, Bill Fawcett decided to get Mayfair Games into the RPG field, and the company began its Role Aids game line by publishing Beastmaker Mountain (1982).

They also published:

- Betrayal at Bogwater (1988)
- The Haunt (1988)
- The Raiders of Ironrock (1988)
- Wraith of Derric's Deep (1988)
- Briarwood Castle (1989)
- The Calandia Guidebook (1989)
- Deception at Dasa (1989)

=== Melsonian Arts Council ===
- Fungi of the Far Realms

=== Midkemia Press ===
Midkemia Press published:

- Carse (1980)
- Cities (1980)
- The Black Tower (1981)
- Tulan of the Isles (1981)
- Jonril: Gateway to the Sunken Lands (1982)
- Heart of the Sunken Lands (1983)

=== MMI ===
- Fortress Magoloth (1984)
- The Guardian (1984)

=== Morningstar Publishing Co ===
- Skinwalkers & Shapeshifters (1980)
- Sol - The World of Galendor (1981)

=== Naois Publications ===
- Rashangar - The World of Galendor (1981)

=== New Infinities Productions ===
New Infinities Productions published:

- The Abduction of Good King Despot (1987)
- Aesheba: Greek Africa (1987)
- The Convert (1987)
- Town of Baldemar (1987)

=== Nomad Enterprises ===
- Character References Sheets (1982)
- Spellbook Sheets (1982)

=== North Pole Publications ===
- The Tome of Mighty Magic (1982)
- The Serpent Islands (1983)

=== Northern Sages ===
- Starstone (1982)

=== P.J.'s Pier ===
- U.G.S. Fantasy Universal Game Screen (1990)

=== Pandora's Treasures ===
- Apothecary on the Street of Dreams (1990)

=== Phoenix Games ===
Phoenix Games published:

- The Book of Shamans (1978)
- The Book of Treasure (1978)
- The Lost Abbey of Calthonwey (1979)

=== Playing Board Products ===
- Adventure Roster (1979)
- The Adventurers' Cauldron (1979)
- Basic Character File (1979)
- Monster Roster (1979)
- Secondary Character File (1979)
- The Spellcaster's Bible (1979)

=== Quicksilver Fantasies ===
- Carnival in Windemere (1981)
- Crystal's Pleasure Palace (1981)
- The Freak Show (1981)
- Tails of the Expected (1981)
- Journey from Rigour (1982)
- Message from Heartbreak Mountain (1982)
- Quest of the Roan Hart (1983)
- Search for the Treasures of Term (1983)

=== Ragnarok Enterprises ===
- Weres - The Accursed (1980)
- Adventures from the Abyss, issues 1-22 (1983)

=== Reilly Associates ===
- Town Plans
- Dungeon Traps (1980)
- Son of Dungeon Traps (1980)
- Dungeon Trap Handbook (1981)
- Enchanted Treasures (1981)
- Player Character Chronicle (1981)
- Journey to the Cloud Castle (1983)

=== Role-Players ===
- The Enchanted Book (1987)
- Encounter Book (1987)

=== Sage Lore Productions ===
- City Shops (1989)
- Fantasy Campaign Package (1989)
- Dungeon Masters Survival Kit (1990)
- The Handbook of Arcane Artifacts (1990)
- R'nokks Spell Books (1990)
- Small Town Shops (1990)

=== SoftSide Publications ===
- The Quest for the Arm of St. Elsinore (1981)

=== Spellbinder Games ===
- Castle Thrax (1985)

=== Strange Acorn Games ===
- Wyrdworld 1: Wintersfarne (1987)
- Wyrdworld 2: Wordesley (1987)

=== Task Force Games ===
Task Force Games published:

- The Hole Devler's Catalog (1987)
- Central Casting: Heroes of Legend (1988).
- Lejentia Campaigns Book One: Skully's Harbor (1989)
- Lejentia Campaigns Book 2: Fort Bevits (1989)
- Lejentia Stanza Adventure Pack (1989)
- Central Casting: Dungeons (1993)

=== Tor Books ===
Tor Books published The Willow Sourcebook (1988).

=== Turtle Press ===
Weapons is a compendium of virtually every edged or impact melee weapon used in any medieval or primitive culture. Weapons is an indexed sourcebook describing hundreds of different melee weapons, each illustrated. Weapons are covered in six sections: Swords, Knives, Hafted Weapons, Spears, Pole Arms, and Miscellaneous. Weapons was written by Matthew Balent and published in 1981 by Turtle Press, and was later revised and included in The Compendium of Weapons, Armour & Castles. Matthew Balent was one of a few future Palladium Books writers who Kevin Siembieda met through the Detroit Gaming Center. At the time, Balent was working on a reference book that could be used in fantasy roleplaying games. Balent was a Library Sciences graduate, and had the skill and knowledge required to pick through hundreds of books to create a general overview of medieval armor and armaments. The Palladium Book of Weapons & Armor (1981) was the first of several books Balent compiled for Palladium. Lewis Pulsipher reviewed Weapons in The Space Gamer No. 43. Pulsipher commented that "In my view there is no need to add weapons to those already in most FRPG; but if you must, you'll need to look them up in a good source to get some detail. Ten times as much information about a tenth as many weapons, presented more professionally, would have been much more useful. In short, Weapons is virtually useless."

=== Underworld Publishing ===
- Lore of the Crypt Book I: Magic Treasures (1991)
- Lore of the Crypt Book II: Monsters and NPCs (1991)
- Lore of the Crypt Book III: Spells (1991)
- Lore of the Crypt Book IV: New Rules, Races, and Classes (1991)
- Lore of the Crypt Book V: Adventures (1991)

=== Varanae ===
- Trap Manual (1979)
- The Monstrum 1 (1980)
- Dragons (1981)

=== Wee Warriors ===
Wee Warriors published:

- The Character Archaic (1975)
- Palace of the Vampire Queen (1976)
- The Dwarven Glory (1977)
- Misty Isles (1977)

=== White Rose Publishing ===
- Medieval France (1994)

=== Wilmark Dynasty ===
- Chivalry Lives (1980)
- Roomscapes (1980)
- The Burgundy Pit (1981)
- Escape from Shadowland (1981)
- Journey to the Center of the Circle (1981)
- The Lake of Purity (1981)

=== World of Vision Enterprises ===
- The Temple of Andar (1989)

=== Zeppelin Publications ===
- Order of St. Talis (1979)

== See also ==
- List of Dungeons & Dragons modules
- List of Dungeons & Dragons adventures
