= Wyrdworld =

Wyrdworld or Wyrd World may refer to:

- Wyrd World 1: Wintersfarne, a role-playing game
- Wyrdworld 2: Wordesley, a role-playing game
