= Long Live the King (adventure) =

Tabletop role-playing game adventure

- Designers: Bill Peschel
- Publishers: Entertainment Concepts Inc.
- Publication: 1983
- Genres: Fantasy

Long Live the King is an adventure published by Entertainment Concepts Inc. (ECI) in 1983 that uses the rules of the fantasy role-playing play-by-mail (PBM) game Silverdawn.

== Plot summary ==
The old and childless king of Dana has died under mysterious circumstances. Not only do the player characters have to investigate the king's death, they must also maneuver through layers of court intrigue as the seven barons of the kingdom jostle for power in the succession struggle.

The adventure was written for the World of Silverdawn, and uses the rules system developed for the PBM game Silverdawn.

== Publication history ==
In 1981, Jim Dutton developed a PBM game, Silverdawn, and founded ECI in order to publish it. In the first two years of the game, 2500 gamers played Silverdawn, and Dutton decided to branch out by producing individual adventures set in what was called the World of Silverdawn. In all, six modules were published, including The Village of Peddler's Ferry and Long Live the King. The latter was written by Bill Peschel and published by ECI in 1983 as a 16-page book.

== Reception ==
In Issue 31 of Abyss, Jon Schuller called this "a curious and rather interesting scenario/module." Schuller felt "the basic ideas here are quite good, and the background and situations are set up rather nicely too." However, Schuller questioned whether the brief 16-page module contained enough to do justice to the plot, noting, "it is a bit weak on development of specific situations and events ... [it] is essentially the bones of an excellent minicampaign, which, with some elaboration, could be excellent." Schuller pointed out that the adventure was "underdeveloped to the point that there is a bit of the burden on the gamemaster to add information and elaborate on the material provided." Schuller concluded, "The format of presentation and the ideas are excellent, but to realize the potential of the module the GM will have to do a fair amount of advance preparation."
