= Tulan of the Isles =

Tabletop role-playing game supplement

Tulan of the Isles is a universal fantasy role-playing game supplement published by Midkemia Press in 1981, later reprinted by Chaosium in 1987, that describes a medieval city environment.

== Publication history ==
Following the 1976 publication of City State of the Invincible Overlord by Judges Guild, an overview of a medieval city that could be adapted to any role-playing game system, Midkemia Press created a similar work, The City of Carse in 1980. Midkemia then followed up the next year with Tulan of the Isles, a 54-page typewritten softcover book by Raymond Feist, Stephen Abrams, April Abrams, and William Dunn.

In the 2014 book Designers & Dragons: The '70s, author Shannon Appelcline said of the city books produced by Midkemia, "It's these urban settings – all located within the First Midkemian Campaign – that are the best-remembered publication from Midkemia Press' brief years of publication."

After Midkemia ceased publication, Chaosium was able to licensed the Midkemia supplements under their "Universal Supplement Series" brand in an attempt to bring back the idea of publishing generic supplements that could be used with other games. While Midkemia's original books were typewritten and featured simple line drawing illustrations, Chaosium's reprints were professionally typeset softcover books with glossy covers, featuring professional artwork, and revised and expanded contents. This resulted in a third edition of the supplement Cities (1986), a third edition of Carse (1986), and a 64-page second edition of Tulan of the Isles.

== Contents ==
Tulan of the Isles describes the city of Tulan, which lies in the same area as the city of Carse. Unlike Carse, which is a free port city, Tulan is ruled by the Baron of Carse. The book provides detailed information about the buildings of the city and their inhabitants, as well as background on the local politics, and provides a fold-out map of the town and blueprints of some of the buildings. The lands immediately outside the city are also described, including the nearby village of Hoxley.

The book also describes what a typical party of adventurers would do upon entering the city, and provides a random encounter table with basic story hooks.

== Reception ==
In the July 1981 edition of The Space Gamer (No. 41), William A. Barton gave the first edition by Midkemia Press a thumbs up, saying "Tulan of the Isles will undoubtedly enhance any fantasy role-playing game with which it is used. Unless you abhor 'instant cities', it deserves a place in your fantasy library."

In the August 1988 edition of Dragon (Issue #136), Jim Bambra compared Chaosium's reprints of Tulan of the Isles and Carse to Mayfair Games' recent reprint of City-State of the Invincible Overlord, and gave Tulan the highest rating, saying, "Of the detailed building-by-building urban settings under consideration this month... Tulan of the Isles is easily the best of the three."
