= Knights of the Round Table (disambiguation) =

The Knights of the Round Table are the order of knights associated with King Arthur in the Arthurian legend.

Knights of the Round Table may also refer to:

- Knights of the Round Table (film), a 1953 British film based on the Arthurian legend
- Knights of the Round Table (role-playing game), a 1976 role-playing game based on the Arthurian legend

== See also ==
- Round Table
- Knights of the Round
