= The Nine Doctrines of Darkness =

Role-playing game supplement

The Nine Doctrines of Darkness is a fantasy role-playing game adventure and setting published by Dimension Six in 1980.

== Description ==
The Nine Doctrines of Darkness is a "generic" adventure (one that was not designed for a specific game system such as Dungeons & Dragons or Tunnels & Trolls) that the gamemaster must adapt to a specific game system. The majority of this book outlines a fantasy setting in a country called Opar and notable characters who inhabit it. A short adventure involves a book of arcane knowledge that disappeared and then reappeared as a possession of a good king of the elves.

== Publication history ==
Dimension Six, based in Englewood, California, appeared in 1980 and published a number of products that year for fantasy role-playing including Furioso, Mountain of Mystery, The Temple to Athena, and The Nine Doctrines of Darkness. The latter was a typewritten 24-page saddle-stapled softcover book designed by Randy Fraser, with artwork by Carol Knight.

The following year, Dimension Six published a sequel, The Nine Doctrines of Darkness: The Second Adventure, also written by Randy Fraser, with interior art by Quang Ho and cover art by William Temple Davis. Dimension Six only published one more product, Town of Joudan (1981) before disappearing.

== Reception ==
Some reviewers noted that this adventure was more of an adventure setting than a complete adventure, and the gamemaster would need to do a fair amount of work to develop it before it could be used. The low production values such a typewritten pages and amateur artwork were also noted.

In the September 1980 issue of The Space Gamer (Issue No. 31), Aaron Allston did not think it was worth the effort, saying, "All in all, this adventure seemed to be a campaign-sized set of ideas, not wholly developed, and not really worth the cost."

In the February 1981 edition of Dragon (Issue 46), Tony Watson mentioned the rather amateurish production values: "The book [is] printed in typewriter-size print... As a general rule the artwork is acceptable, but varies greatly in quality and craftsmanship. Several maps are included, of varying clarity and usefulness... The printing, art, etc., varies greatly." Watson also commented on the incompleteness of its ideas, saying, "The Nine Doctrines of Darkness is less of an adventure than a detailed landscape peopled with interesting characters. It begins with a well written background and then spends most of the remaining space giving the history, abilities, and probable behavior of a wide variety of character types." Watson also noted that because it was a generic adventure, the gamemaster would have to spend a fair amount of work adapting it to whichever game system was being used to run the adventure. He concluded, "If you buy [this adventure], you will be buying ideas. Many of the ideas are very good and if you value such, either for use as a module or to include in your campaign, you should be pleased by the purchase."
