= Catapult Run =

Role-playing game

Cover of first edition (1984)

Catapult Run, subtitled "A Race of Epic Proportions", is a fantasy role-playing game adventure published by Fantasy Factory in 1984.

== Plot summary ==
The adventure is set in the World of Cypher. Thematically similar to the contemporaneous movie The Cannonball Run (1981), the player characters are participating in a five-team race held only once every seven years. To win, the characters must traverse 600 miles of wilderness, overcoming geographical obstacles, combat with the other teams, and ravenous monsters, in order to be the first to reach the City of Cypher and place a crystal orb in the crown of King Kornilian. Although spellcasting is allowed during the race, no teleportation magic can be used.

== Publication history ==
Cover of second edition (1984)

Catapult Run was designed by Joe Thwaites, Chris Abbott, and Ian Hartshorn, with interior art by Colin Nordel and Ken Broad, cover art by Jeff Lowe, Chris Abbott, and Colin Nordel, and cartography by Stephen Mortimer. The appendix includes weather conditions for each day of the race, pre-generated characters, and optional overland movement rules. Both editions were published by Canadian publisher Fantasy Factory in 1984.

The adventure is played using the rules of Advanced Dungeons & Dragons published by TSR, Inc. Fantasy Factory, a Canadian publisher based in Brampton, Ontario, had no connection to TSR, and its use of the AD&D rules was unlicensed. The first sentence of the introduction to this adventure claimed "This is the first in a group of modules, each of which can be played on its own or as part of the series", but no further adventures were ever published.

=== First edition ===
The first edition (1984) is a 44-page saddle-stapled digest-sized softcover book that has a simple grey and red cover with a black & white illustration. The inside front cover has a pocket that holds a 28-page map booklet, an errata sheet and an 8-page illustration booklet.

=== Second edition ===
The second edition (also 1984) is a 32-page saddle-stapled softcover book featuring a much more professional four-colour bi-fold cover.

== Reception ==
In the June 1985 edition of Space Gamer (Issue No. 74), Allen Varney called the writing "clear and professional", but thought the art was "bad or dull, or both." Varney found the various encounters to be "complete and sometimes imaginative", and the new rules for drowning and overland travel "intelligent". But Varney was ambivalent about this adventure, saying, "I think most adventurers would want a more coherent approach. The race is a flimsy device for stringing together a batch of completely unrelated encounters." He concluded, "Catapult Run is a respectable product, but it lacks imagination, replay value – the race is run once every seven years – and a useful story line. Whether it might have been improved had TSR authorized and supervised its production is problematic. Anyway, it's okay for a first effort."

== Reviews ==
- Abyss, Issue 36 (Winter 1985)
- Alarums & Excursions, Issue 503 (September 2017)
