= Monstrum 1 =

Monstrum 1 is a 1980 role-playing game supplement published by Varanae.

== Contents ==
Monstrum 1 is a supplement in which 100 fully illustrated high‑level monsters are contained, with art on one side and game stats on the other so the gamemaster can show players the picture without revealing the statistics.

== Publication history ==
The Monstrum 1 was written by David Graves, Felder, and Boudin and published by Varanae in 1980 as a 108-page book, with a revised 2nd edition published in 1987 by Varanae/Role-Players.

== Reviews ==
- Abyss #40 (Spring, 1987)
