= GURPS Mysteries =

Tabletop role-playing game sourcebook

- Designers: Lisa J. Steele
- Publishers: Steve Jackson Games
- Publication: 2005
- Genres: Mystery
- Systems: GURPS fourth edition

GURPS Mysteries is a source book for the GURPS Role-playing game written by criminal defense attorney and game designer Lisa J. Steele.

== Contents ==
GURPS Mysteries covers the mystery genre by describing a crime and the motivation behind it to its detection via explaining its clues and witnesses. Several crimes are described, including arson, blackmail, burglary, and kidnapping, but homicide or murder is the book's focus. GURPS Mysteries covers eras from Ancient Rome and the Middle Ages to modern times and the far future with some coverage of the paranormal as well. The book includes a complete chapter devoted to the low-tech mystery and the low-tech investigator. It addresses some of the issues of roleplaying the historical mystery scenario, from the need for the sleuth to have status if he is to be free to investigate to the players being too aware, both in terms of the genre and technology.

The book covers creating and running mystery based adventures and campaigns, crime scenes, and advanced rules for questioning and interrogating NPCs.

== Publication history ==
Steve Jackson Games released the fourth edition genre book GURPS Mysteries in 2005 initially as an e-book, and later adding a print-on-demand version, through its online PDF store, e23. The book's author is a criminal defense attorney.

== Reception ==
Matthew Pook reviewed GURPS Mysteries for Pyramid magazine #10 (August 2009). He comments that "this book serves as an invaluable guide to the genre".

== See also ==
- List of GURPS books
