= The Temple to Athena =

Tabletop role-playing game adventure

The Temple to Athena is a fantasy role-playing game adventure published by Dimension Six in 1980.

== Contents ==
The Temple to Athena is a "generic" adventure (one that was not designed for a specific game system such as Advanced Dungeons & Dragons or Tunnels & Trolls) set at a temple in the middle of a large swamp. Although it can be played as a stand-alone adventure, it can also be treated as the direct sequel to another Dimension Six adventure, Mountain of Mystery. In this case, the player characters are teleported from the Mountain of Mystery setting directly to the temple in this adventure.

The adventure involves a series of quests that the adventurers agree to do for various groups and characters they meet on the way to the Temple to Athena.

== Publication history ==
Dimension Six, based in Englewood, California, appeared in 1980 and published a number of products that year for fantasy role-playing including Furioso, The Nine Doctrines of Darkness, and Mountain of Mystery. Later the same year, they also published a sequel to Mountain of Mystery, a 24-page saddle-stapled softcover book titled The Temple of Athena, designed by Ken Ritchart, with artwork by Michael Carroll, Ray Schelgunov, Jr., and Vandy Vandervort.

== Reception ==
Reviews were mixed, with all reviewers remarking on the amateurish typewritten pages and low productions values.

In the October 1980 edition of The Space Gamer (Issue No. 32), Lorin Rivers gave it a thumbs down: "All in all, a waste of [money]. Not recommended."

In the October–November edition of Different Worlds (Issue No. 10), Anders Swensen "found the actual adventure to be poorly done." He believed there was a germ of an idea in the adventure but "While it is possible to work up an adequately detailed adventure from the material in The Tenple to Athena, it would likely take as long as starting from scratch." He concluded, "If the level of [fantasy roleplaying] hobby aids is to be improved, the very bad must be remarked upon, and overall, The Temple of Athena is very bad, indeed."

In the February 1981 edition of Dragon (Issue 46), Tony Watson mentioned the low production values: "As a general rule the artwork is acceptable, but varies greatly in quality and craftsmanship. Several maps are included, of varying clarity and usefulness... The printing, art, etc., varies greatly." Watson also noted that because it was a generic adventure, it was "very general in spots. To make [this work] flexible enough for use with different systems, there have been a lot of minor details omitted that will have to be added before play begins." However, he concluded with a qualified recommendation, saying "There are several outstanding traps and rooms here, and the adventure is worth the price just for these."
