= The Dungeon of King Lout =

Tabletop fantasy role-playing game supplement

- Publishers: Infinity Limited
- Publication: 1982; 44 years ago
- Genres: Fantasy
- Systems: Generic

The Dungeon of King Lout is a 1982 fantasy role-playing game adventure published by Infinity Limited.

== Contents ==
The Dungeon of King Lout is an adventure of an underground journey to rescue an elven princess held prisoner by the evil King Lout. It contains three sequentially-linked adventures: "The Wicked Dungeon of King Lout", "The Monster's Lair" and "The Wizard's Chambers."

== Reception ==
In Issue 53 of The Space Gamer, J. David George commented that "As good as just about anything else on the market, The Dungeon of King Lout is fine if the GM doesn't mind fleshing out details and statistics. As is, though, most GMs could do as well on their own without much more effort. At [the price], it's not worth it."

Dave Nalle reviewed The Dungeon of King Lout for Different Worlds and stated that "This product is ridiculously overpriced, almost contentless, and an affront to my pride as a gamer. There is no reason why anyone would buy this. You can design your own random and unrealistic dungeon (if you want) in the same time it would take you to prepare The Dungeon of King Lout, and you would save [money]."

In Issue 20 of Abyss, Jon Schuller called this "totally unplayable, since in no cases is enough description given to even figure out what monsters, traps and magic items are ... Not only are all of the encounters totally unimaginative, the GM is expected to do all of the actual work, work which most people buy such scenarios to avoid doing." Schuller concluded, "The only reason to buy The Dungeon of King Lout is as an example of the worst FRP game aid ever designed."
