= Dragons (Varanae) =

Dragons is a 1981 role-playing game supplement published by Varanae.

== Contents ==
Dragons is a supplement in which fifty dragon types—ranging from the Air Dragon to the Zen Dragon—are presented in a bestiary format.

== Publication history ==
Dragons was written by David Graves with illustrations by Doug Philip, and published by Varanae in 1981 as a 100-page book, with a revised 2nd edition published in 1987 by Varanae/Role-Players.

== Reviews ==
- Abyss #40 (Spring, 1987)
