= Places of Mystery IV: Highroad =

Places of Mystery IV: Highroad is a 1984 role-playing game supplement published by The Companions.

== Contents ==
Places of Mystery IV: Highroad is a supplement in which a gamemaster's aid offers ten fully mapped roadside encounter sites—from a drawbridge to a sprites' grove—designed for use with 25mm miniatures.

== Publication history ==
Places of Mystery IV: Highroad was edited by Wm. John Wheeler and published by The Companions in 1984 as a 40-page book.

== Reviews ==
- Abyss #39 (Fall, 1986)
