= Furioso (Dimension Six) =

Furioso is a fantasy role-playing game adventure published by Dimension Six in 1980.

== Contents ==
Furioso is an adventure based on part of the epic Orlando Furioso by Ludovico Ariosto. An ancient and deadly weapon that had been lost is rediscovered. A way must be found to destroy it before it can be used by evil forces.

== Publication history ==
Davy Davis originally designed the role-playing scenario Furioso as a tournament adventure that was presented at Genghis Con II, a games convention in Denver, Colorado. The adventure was subsequently published in 1980 by new games company Dimension Six of Englewood, California that also published a number of other products that year including Mountain of Mystery, The Temple to Athena, and The Nine Doctrines of Darkness. Furioso was released as a typewritten 72-page saddle-stapled softcover book designed by Davy Davis, with artwork by Franz Sales Meyer, Alexander Speltz and Gustave Doré.

== Reception ==
In Issue 42 of The Space Gamer (August 1981), Aaron Allston was not very impressed with this product, finding it too predictable and saying "Players who appreciate adventures which lead their characters from obstacle to obstacle toward an inevitable end will probably enjoy this." He concluded with a thumbs down, writing, "DMs looking for another adventure to incorporate into their worlds, and world-builders who admire Orlando Furioso, should come up with something of their own."
