= Monster File Number One =

Tabletop role-playing game supplement

Monster File Number One is a 1981 role-playing game supplement published by The Dragon Tree.

== Contents ==
Monster File Number One is a set of 48 filing cards with game statistics for a fantasy monster printed on one side and an illustration of the monster on the other side.

== Reception ==
Lewis Pulsipher reviewed Monster File One in The Space Gamer No. 42. Pulsipher commented that "By 1974 standards this is a decent set - better than All the World's Monsters I, for example - but by 1981 standards the monsters do not show well. If the format appeals to you you might want to try this set or the planned Monster File Two. Otherwise, you'll have to decide if a few usable monsters are worth [the price]. I don't think so."
