= Castle Thrax =

Castle Thrax is a 1985 role-playing game adventure published by Spellbinders Games.

== Contents ==
Castle Thrax is an adventure in which a magic-filled castle is designed for cooperative group play using level 4-8 player characters without a gamemaster using self-contained rules.

== Publication history ==
Castle Thrax was written by Paul Burdick with art by Dave Billman and published by Spellbinders Games in 1985 as a 24-page book.

== Reviews ==
- Abyss #37
