= Lisa J. Steele =

American role-playing game designer

- Occupation: Game designer

Lisa J. Steele is an American game designer and an attorney.

== Career ==
=== Role-playing games ===
Lisa Steele is the author of:

- Fief
- Town
- Medieval France
- GURPS Cops
- GURPS Mysteries

She is also a contributing author to: Dark Ages: Europe and Spoils of War in White Wolf's Dark Ages: Vampire line.

- Vampire: The Dark Ages
- Worlds in Shadow in Evil Hat Production's Fate Core line
- Bubblegumshoe, a Gumshoe Teen Noir setting, published by Evil Hat in June 2016. Bubblegumshoe was the winner of the 2017 Gold ENnie for Best Family Game.

=== Attorney ===
Lisa Steele is also an attorney.

She is, or has been, a member of:

- Massachusetts Supreme Judicial Court Eyewitness Identification Standing Committee (2014 to date)
- Connecticut Legislature Judiciary Committee Eyewitness Identification Task Force (2011-2016)

She is the author of various legal articles including:

- The Defense Challenge to Fingerprints
- Trying Identification Cases
- Smile for the Security Camera

She is also the author of a book:

- The Defense Counsel Playbook for Eyewitness Identification Cases (NACDL Press, 2020)

Working as a criminal defense appellate attorney, Steele wrote to The Boston Globe in 1997 about problems she had encountered, urging the Massachusetts Legislature "to require all interrogations, Miranda warnings and waivers, and confessions to be video recorded from start to finish when conducted in the station house and audio recorded when feasible in other locations" after the police from Newton, Massachusetts failed to record a defendant interview soon after the incident at the heart of the Louise Woodward case. Steele again wrote to The Boston Globe in 2002 about the unreliability of eyewitness testimonies, after viewing The Neil Miller Story, a film about a convict who was acquitted of rape through DNA evidence after serving years in prison convicted through eyewitness testimony for a crime he did not commit.

Steele works for Steele & Associates in Shrewsbury, Massachusetts, and specializes in appeals where she represents criminal defendants who cannot afford a lawyer. She practices in Massachusetts and Connecticut.

Steele's first success in eyewitness identification was State v. Ledbetter, 275 Conn. 534 (2005), which established a jury instruction to be given when police do not follow specific precautions in an identification procedure.

Twelve years later, Steele represented Brady Guilbert in the unsuccessful challenge before the Connecticut Supreme Court of his conviction for a shooting and two murders in October 2004; despite minimal physical evidence to connect Guilbert with the shootings, after the judge disallowed the defense from calling an associate clinical professor of psychiatry who was an expert on eyewitness identifications from testifying on how stress can alter memory of events, and Guilbert was convicted of murder, capital felony and first-degree assault and given a life sentence. Although the Court upheld Guilbert's conviction, in State v. Guilbert, 306 Conn. 218 (2012), Steele commented that the Court's later 2012 ruling was "wonderful" and "an endorsement of science" that criminal defense attorneys would be permitted to present experts testimony at trial about the unreliability of witness accounts .
