= Towns of the Outlands =

Tabletop role-playing game supplement

Towns of the Outlands is a 1981 role-playing game supplement published by Midkemia Press.

== Authors ==
Richard A. Edwards, Wesley M. Divin, Russell Young. All of Olympia, WA, and members of the Olympia Simulation Gaming Association in the early 1980s when this book was written. They attended its release at Origins ‘81 in San Mateo, CA.

== Contents ==
Towns of the Outlands includes: QUM-AL-NASHIR, a desert oasis designed by Wesley M. Divin. WINTER CREEK, a smuggler’s cove designed by Russell Young. BIRKA, a northern trading center designed by Richard A. Edwards. OSWESTRY, a tribal hill fort designed by Richard A. Edwards. MORRISON’S ROADHOUSE, a woodland crossroad by Wesley M. Divin. GOLDCREST, a mining town by Russell Young.

With a wide variety of environments, The six town settings were designed to be individually set into any fantasy world setting.

Midkemia Press and author Raymond Feist, who edited Towns of the Outlands, also set these towns into their world of Midkemia.

Each town includes a detailed map and index.

== Publication history ==
Towns of the Outlands is the fourth supplement focusing on cities published by Midkemia Press.

== Reception ==
Anders Swenson reviewed Towns of the Outlands for Different Worlds magazine and stated that "The reader may get the impression that I liked this game aid - it is very useful and has many well-done points. I was particularly pleased to find a compendium of small towns - because these are poorly represented in the FRP literature. I think that Towns of the Outlands is an excellent buy for any GM who runs an outdoor or overland game."

Rudy Kraft reviewed Towns of the Outlands in The Space Gamer No. 45. Kraft commented that "This is an excellent product and I highly recommend it to any FRP game master."

== Translations ==
Towns of the Outlands was published as ‘’Jenseits der Hügel’’ in German in 1988 by Verlag für Fantasy- und Science Fiction-Spiele.
