= Heart of the Sunken Lands =

Tabletop role-playing game supplement

Heart of the Sunken Lands is a 1983 role-playing game supplement published by Midkemia Press.

== Contents ==
Heart of the Sunken Lands is a supplement in which the expansive exploration of a wilderness campaign is blended with the treasure-seeking drive of a dungeon crawl. This is a scenario book that is set in the Midkemia world, which ties into the existing lore of the world, including cities like Carse, Tulin, and Jonril, and references the Wizard novel by Raymond Feist. The Sunken Lands contain magical flora and fauna with commercial value, prompting expeditions from Jonril in search of rare goods. Gameplay relies on die-roll-driven tables to generate terrain and encounters, filling in a blank player map as exploration progresses. The gamemaster uses a pre-determined terrain map while managing travel time, encounter frequency, and player interactions with randomly determined events. Encounters span a wide range, including humans, monsters, exotic animals, and resources. The scenario book includes a log sheet to aid encounter tracking and integrates fixed locations into the larger random generation system.

The scenario unfolds in a wilderness teeming with magic, where monsters guard substantial wealth. The Sunken Lands and their inhabitants are randomly generated from detailed tables as the player characters explore, filling in a mostly blank map as they progress. The scenario is set in the world of Midkemia and connects to the sourcebook Jonril: Gateway to the Sunken Lands.

== Publication history ==
Heart of the Sunken Lands was written by Rudy Kraft and published by Midkemia Press in 1983 as 78-page book with a map.

Shannon Appelcline commented that "With full-color covers and external designers, Midkemia Press looked like it was poised to become a real mover in the RPG field. Instead, the company published only two more books, Jonril: Gateway to the Sunken Lands [...] and Heart of the Sunken Lands (1983), both of which were also produced to the same higher standards as the revised Cities. The last book was by Rudy Kraft - best known for his work on RuneQuest supplements like Snake Pipe Hollow (1979) and Griffin Mountain (1981). It did for the wilderness what Cities did for urban settings. A GM could now consult tables, sub-tables, and sub-sub-tables to generate wilderness encounters; players even got to fill in a map as they explored the Sunken Lands." Midkema returned to publication in 1997 through the internet, allowing them to make their original books available once more: "they sold their remaining stock, which consisted of those final books printed with two-color covers: Cities second edition, Jonril, and Heart of the Sunken Lands. The last two sold out quickly, but Midkemia was selling Cities until 2010.

== Reception ==
Anders Swenson reviewed Heart of the Sunken Lands for Different Worlds magazine and stated that "Heart of the Sunken Lands is perhaps the ultimate expansion of the random overland adventure from early D&D. This game will not appeal to all of the gamemasters who useother Midkemia modules, especially the cities. It is a good buy for the Midkemia completist, and for those gamemasters who definitely prefer the table-oriented random overland adventure."
