= Mountain of Mystery =

Tabletop role-playing game adventure

Mountain of Mystery is a role-playing game adventure published by Dimension Six in 1980.

== Contents ==
Mountain of Mystery is a "generic" adventure (one that was not designed for a specific game system such as Advanced Dungeons & Dragons or Tunnels & Trolls) set in a dungeon. The player characters investigate a long-abandoned stronghold that is now inhabited by a variety of monsters.

It can be run as a stand-alone adventure, or it can also be treated as the direct prequel to another Dimension Six adventure, The Temple to Athena. If this is the case, then at the end of this adventure, the player characters are teleported to the temple setting of the sequel.

== Publication history ==
Dimension Six, based in Englewood, California, appeared in 1980 and published a number of products that year for fantasy role-playing including Furioso, The Nine Doctrines of Darkness, and Mountain of Mystery. The latter is a typewritten 24-page saddle-stapled softcover book designed by Ken Richart, with artwork by Carol Knight, Michael Carroll, and Vandy Vandervort.

Dimension Six also published a sequel to Mountain of Mystery the same year, The Temple to Athena.

== Reception ==
Reviews were mixed, with all reviewers remarking on the low-budget typewritten pages, amateur artwork and low production values.

In the September 1980 edition of The Space Gamer, Aaron Allston was not impressed, and thought the work of converting this generic adventure to a specific game system such as AD&D was not worth the effort: "All the conversion-ease claims might be overlooked if this were an imaginative or fun dungeon. It isn't. [...] In all, a very missable adventure."

In the February 1981 edition of Dragon (Issue 46), Tony Watson mentioned the low production values: "As a general rule the artwork is acceptable, but varies greatly in quality and craftsmanship. Several maps are included, of varying clarity and usefulness... The printing, art, etc., varies greatly." Watson also noted that because it was a generic adventure, it was "very general in spots. To make [this work] flexible enough for use with different systems, there have been a lot of minor details omitted that will have to be added before play begins." He also noted a lack of detail that would have to be added by the gamemaster, and some inconsistency. He concluded with a qualified recommendation, saying "There are some very good ideas", but warned of a lot of work that would be needed to be done before play could begin: "If you buy [this] adventure, you will be buying ideas. Many of the ideas are very good and if you value such, either for use as a module or to include in your campaign, you should be pleased by the purchase.
