= Town of Baldemar =

Town of Baldemar is a 1987 system generic role-playing game supplement published by New Infinities Productions.

== Contents ==
Town of Baldemar is a supplement in which a campaign setting centers on a medieval river town, featuring detailed locations, numerous characters, and a system for tracking local politics.

== Publication history ==
Town of Baldemar was written by Robert J. Blake and published by New Infinities Productions Inc. in 1987 as a 96-page book with a color map.

== Reviews ==
- Abyss #41 (Winter, 1987)
- Papyrus (Issue 9 - 1993)
- Computer and Video Games
