= The Tome of Mighty Magic =

Fantasy role-playing game supplement

- Cover art by Frank Paul Scalfano, Jr.
- Designers: Craig Addison; Douglas E. Bohlman; James A. Dees; Michael A. Pouyadou; Paula Rae Pouyadou; Doug Price; David Speight; Roger Walker; Michael D. Woodard; Linda Woodard
- Illustrators: Frank Paul Scalfano, Jr.
- Publishers: North Pole Publications
- Publication: 1982
- Genres: Fantasy

The Tome of Mighty Magic is a supplement published by North Pole Publications in 1982 as an aid to fantasy role-playing games, particularly Dungeons & Dragons.

== Contents ==
The Tome of Mighty Magic presents more than 270 magic spells from 1st to 20th level. Although the content is unlicensed, the formatting is identical to that used by TSR in their contemporaneous D&D publications.

== Publication history ==
After the fantasy role-playing game D&D was published by TSR in 1974, other publishers created material compatible with TSR's game. By 1980, TSR was trying to tamp down this unlicensed material through threatened litigation, and many small publishers exited the market. One of the last unlicensed publications of this period was The Tome of Mighty Magic, designed by Craig Addison, Douglas E. Bohlman, James A. Dees, Michael A. Pouyadou, Paula Rae Pouyadou, Doug Price, David Speight, Roger Walker, Michael D. Woodard, Linda Woodard, and Dean Yoas, and was published by North Pole Publications in 1982 as a 108-page book with cover art by Frank Paul Scalfano, Jr.

In 1992, Lou Zocchi's company Gamescience acquired the rights to the book and republished it.

Shannon Appelcline commented "A few more RPG books appeared during Gamescience's final period of new roleplaying activity. They included Lou Zocchi's Book of Tables (1988), a corrected Fantasy Gamer's Compendium (1990), and an unofficial AD&D accessory, The Tome of Mighty Magic (1992) — the last previously printed by North Pole Productions (1982), a tiny Alabama publisher from the final days of the original D&D boom. Though these books showed that Gamescience was still occasionally publishing new RPG books in the late '80s and early '90s, they were relatively minor to the overall history of the company."

== Reception ==
In Issue 24 of Abyss, Carl Jones was unsure of the efficacy of this material, noting, "There is a lot of material in small type in the booklet, but the usefulness of most of it is questionable." Jones pointed out that many of the spells duplicated or were very similar to material previously published by both TSR and unlicensed publishers of the late 1970s. Jones concluded, "for those who need new magical ideas desperately, The Tome of Mighty Magic might have some value, although the usefulness of the contents to anyone is rather low for the price ... this is one to be bought only with caution and after considering its value to you."
