= The Book of Demons =

Role-playing game supplement

Cover art of original edition by Bob Charrette, 1976

The Book of Demons is a supplement published by Little Soldier Games in 1976 for fantasy role-playing games.

== Contents ==
The Book of Demons is a supplement containing rules for demon conjuration, and includes descriptions for 85 demons.

== Publication history ==
Little Soldier Games had been founded in 1975 by Ed Konstant and David Perez. After an abortive attempt at a role-playing game based on J.R.R. Tolkien's The Lord of the Rings and an Arthurian role-playing game called Knights of the Round Table, Konstant and Perez decided to supply third-party supplements for the new role-playing game Dungeons & Dragons. They used Phil Edgren, who owned a bookstore around the corner from their shop, to write the text for their first book, The Book of Monsters; they then asked Edgren to write a second book, The Book of Demons. The illustrations and cover art were done by Bob Charrette.

In 1978, Phoenix Games bought Little Soldier Games, and signed over the rights to the Little Soldier back-catalogue to Gamescience after Gamescience paid the printing costs for Phoenix's first two products. Gamescience later included The Book of Demons in the 1990 compilation The Fantasy Gamer's Compendium.

Shannon Appelcline said that Dungeons & Dragons was the clear market leader among about a dozen RPGs available by early 1977, by which time "third parties had begun supplementing the game, with the most notable early supplements including Wee Warrior's The Character Archaic (1975) and Palace of the Vampire Queen (1976), Little Soldier's The Book of Monsters (1976) and The Book of Demons (1976), and Judges Guild's City State of the Invincible Overlord (1976+) and Dungeon Tac Reference Cards (1976). It would be 1977 or 1978 before "generic fantasy" supplements intended for D&D really started to proliferate". Appelcline added that TSR was publishing rules expansion supplements in the early days of D&D which "included new classes, new spells, new artifacts, and generally new rules — and almost none of the third-party publishers were duplicating them. Little Soldier did present some black magic rules in The Book of Demons, but that was a rare and much more focused exception."

Appelcline also said that Gamescience bought the back catalog of Little Soldier Games in 1978, "which included several board games and a half-dozen 'generic' fantasy supplements of very early pedigree. (Little Soldier had published them starting in 1976.) Gamescience expanded its roleplaying line almost immediately with reprints of Little Soldier's Book of Demons (1978) and Book of Monsters (1978). Zocchi had originally planned to publish more, but the rest of the Little Soldier FRP books would have to wait until all six appeared as part of The Fantasy Gamer's Compendium (1983)."

== Reception ==
Lew Pulsipher reviewed The Book of Demons for White Dwarf #5, and stated that "Book of Demons may be worthwhile if you like new character classes and permit Chaotic characters in your campaign. I should also point out that the Black Magician class probably won't work in crossover play because the referee won't have sufficient control over what occurs."

Mark Barrowcliffe wrote in The Elfish Gene that he 'spent hours trying to fit [it] into Dungeons and Dragons - the main problem being that, when you're being charged down by a Minotaur, you don't really have time to whip out the chalk, draw a pentagram on the floor and project yourself into a trance in order to summon the spirits of the night.'
