= The Book of Monsters =

Role-playing game supplement

- Illustrators: Bob Charrette
- Writers: Phil Edgren
- Publishers: Little Soldier Games
- Publication: 1976
- Genres: Role-playing

The Book of Monsters is a supplement for fantasy role-playing games published by Little Soldier Games in 1976.

== Contents ==
The Book of Monsters is a supplement which details 124 monsters of myth and legend from around the world.

== Publication history ==
Little Soldier Games had been founded in 1975 by Ed Konstant and David Perez. After an abortive attempt at a role-playing game based on J.R.R. Tolkien's The Lord of the Rings and an Arthurian role-playing game called Knights of the Round Table, Konstant and Perez decided to supply third-party supplements for the new role-playing game Dungeons & Dragons. They called upon Phil Edgren, who owned a bookstore around the corner from their shop, to write the text to a bestiary of mythical monsters. The result was The Book of Monsters, a digest-sized 44-page book published in 1976 that was the first fantasy bestiary, predating TSR's Monster Manual by a year. The illustrations and cover art were done by Bob Charrette.

In 1978, Phoenix Games bought Little Soldier Games, and signed over the rights to the Little Soldier back-catalogue to Gamescience after Gamescience paid the printing costs for Phoenix's first two products. Gamescience quickly republished a 16-page edition of The Book of Monsters under their banner. They later included it in the 1990 compilation The Fantasy Gamer's Compendium.

In his book Designers & Dragons, game historian Shannon Appelcline commented that "Little Soldier had also gotten into the roleplaying field with a series of generic fantasy-roleplaying supplements, the first of which was The Book of Monsters (1976) a description of 124 monsters by mythological scholar Phil Edgren. Edgren would end up being Little Soldier's most prolific author."

Shannon Appelcline noted that Dungeons & Dragons was the clear market leader among about a dozen RPGs available by early 1977, by which time "third parties had begun supplementing the game, with the most notable early supplements including Wee Warrior's The Character Archaic (1975) and Palace of the Vampire Queen (1976), Little Soldier's The Book of Monsters (1976) and The Book of Demons (1976), and Judges Guild's City State of the Invincible Overlord (1976+) and Dungeon Tac Reference Cards (1976). It would be 1977 or 1978 before "generic fantasy" supplements intended for D&D really started to proliferate, but even then, most would fit into the categories defined by these early publishers: accessories (like The Character Archaic), adventures (like Palace), monsters manuals (like Little Soldier's Books), and setting books (like City State)."

Appelcline also mentioned that Gamescience bought the back catalog of Little Soldier Games in 1978, "which included several board games and a half-dozen "generic" fantasy supplements of very early pedigree. (Little Soldier had published them starting in 1976.) Gamescience expanded its roleplaying line almost immediately with reprints of Little Soldier's Book of Demons (1978) and Book of Monsters (1978). Zocchi had originally planned to publish more, but the rest of the Little Soldier FRP books would have to wait until all six appeared as part of The Fantasy Gamer's Compendium (1983)."

== Reception ==
In the February–March 1978 edition of White Dwarf (Issue #5), Lew Pulsipher did not recommend The Book of Monsters, stating "Book of Monsters really isn't worth it, particularly since much of the information is available in decent libraries in encyclopedias of mythology and folklore."

== Reviews ==
- The Playboy Winner's Guide to Board Games
