= Journey to the Center of the Circle =

Tabletop role-playing game supplement

Journey to the Center of the Circle is a 1981 fantasy role-playing game adventure published by Wilmark Dynasty.

== Contents ==
Journey to the Center of the Circle is an adventure in which the player characters respond to a request for assistance from a renowned shrine of Good.

== Reception ==
Lewis Pulsipher reviewed Journey to the Center of the Circle in The Space Gamer No. 49. Pulsipher commented that "With some tough editing, this module might have been worth publication in a magazine as an example of an unusual approach to FRP. But as a separate module it is as overpriced as Burgundy Pit, and is otherwise not equal to the Pit's modest standard. Unless you're really sold on the idea of halls of testing, save your money."

Ken Rolston reviewed Journey to the Center of the Circle for Different Worlds magazine and stated that "This scenario does give good value; I particularly recommend it because it is an example of a different kind of adventure, prepared by a designer with an original and appealing approach to FRP gaming."
