= The Book of Sorcery =

Tabletop role-playing game supplement

- Illustrators: Bob Charrette
- Writers: Dan Bress, Ed Konstant
- Publishers: Little Soldier Games
- Publication: 1977
- Genres: Role-playing

The Book of Sorcery is a supplement for fantasy role-playing games published by Little Soldier Games in 1977.

== Contents ==
The Book of Sorcery is a supplement presenting rules for spell-casting and incantations for use with spells, as well as new artifacts and magic items.

== Publication history ==
Little Soldier Games was founded in 1975 by Ed Konstant and David Perez. After an abortive attempt at a role-playing game based on J.R.R. Tolkien's The Lord of the Rings and an Arthurian role-playing game called Knights of the Round Table, Konstant and Perez decided to supply third-party supplements for the new role-playing game Dungeons & Dragons. After publishing The Book of Monsters and The Book of Demons in 1976, they released The Book of Sorcery in 1977. It was a digest-sized 44-page book, written by Dan Bress and Ed Konstant. The illustrations and cover art were done by Bob Charrette.

In 1978, Phoenix Games bought Little Soldier Games, and signed over the rights to the Little Soldier back-catalogue to Gamescience after Gamescience paid the printing costs for Phoenix's first two products. Gamescience later included The Book of Sorcery in the 1990 compilation The Fantasy Gamer's Compendium.

== Reception ==
Lew Pulsipher reviewed The Book of Sorcery for White Dwarf #5, and stated that "Book of Sorcery is much too short for [the price]."
