= Plague of Terror =

Tabletop role-playing game adventure

Plague of Terror is a generic role-playing game adventure published by The Companions in 1983, the second in the five-part "Islandia Campaign" series.

== Plot summary ==
The adventure is set in the village of Wentworth, where the player characters find themselves involved in preventing a plot to depose the current baron and break with the King. In terms of game system, the adventure is generic, and can be adapted for any role-playing system such as Dungeons & Dragons or RuneQuest.

== Publication history ==
Peter L. Rice and Wm. John Wheeler, through their company The Companions, had previously published the first adventure in the five-part "Islandia Campaign", The Curse on Hareth (1982).

Plague of Terror, published in 1983, was the second part, a 56-page book with a center-bound color map written by Rice and Wheeler with additional material by Terry Ashbury, Chip Kestenbaum, and Lenard Lakofka, with illustrations by John Carlson, Mary Coman, David J. Hutchins, Kevin Pfusch, Patrick Rowland, and Wm. John Wheeler.

Three more adventures in the Islandia campaign followed in 1983: Brotherhood of the Bolt, Streets of Gems, and Gems for Death.

== Reception ==
In Issue 23 of Imagine, Mike Dean pointed out that because of the adventure's complexity and the necessity of adapting it to a role-playing system, it "will provide your group with many sessions of play, but only if you are prepared to put in the necessary time and work for conversion and full understanding of the plots running through each of them."

In the September 1983 edition of Dragon (#77), Roger E. Moore was not a fan, stating that "Plague of Terror is plagued by some terrible problems." He found the number of plots and sub-plot excessive, and too tightly interwoven for inexperienced gamemasters to easily sort through. He also found the use of "torture, child abuse, sexual assault, sadistic vengeance, and other such activities" to be gratuitous. He concluded with a recommendation to give this a miss, saying, "I cannot recommend this module for inexperienced role-players, for referees who like to do their own creative thinking in role-playing NPCs and setting up scenarios, or for those who feel uncomfortable with violence, torture, etc., etc."
