= The Spellcaster's Bible =

Tabletop role-playing game supplement

The Spellcaster's Bible is a 1979 role-playing game supplement published by The Playing Board.

== Contents ==
The Spellcaster's Bible is a sourcebook with 160 spells intended to be used for any fantasy role-playing game in which characters have experience levels and classes.

== Reception ==
Ron Shigeta reviewed The Spellcaster's Bible in The Space Gamer No. 31. Shigeta commented that "The Spellcaster's Bible appears to be another example of a product that has been released without thorough playtesting or thought, and is with few exceptions, not very useful."
