= Fluffy Quest =

Fluffy Quest is a 1984 role-playing game adventure published by Bad Dog Publications.

== Plot summary ==
Fluffy Quest is an adventure in which a whimsical, parody-style fantasy role-playing adventure designed for five to six players centers on rescuing Fluffy, the mayor's daughter's beloved dog, with the promise of a reward—humorously, another puppy. Player characters lose their standard magical abilities and instead gain access to a revised, animal-themed magic system. Artifacts include "Elvis Boots" and spells such as "magic mouse" and "wall of frogs", and encounters include a tea-sipping pink dragon, giant were-turtles, and the chaotic Three Stooges. The fate of Fluffy is uncertain and comically grim—she might be baked into a pie, held for ransom by the Phantom, or transformed into a monstrous creature.

== Publication history ==
Fluffy Quest was written by Rick Reid and published by Bad Dog Publications in 1984 as a 32-page book.

== Reception ==
Adventurer magazine reviewed Fluffy Quest and stated that "If Fluffy Quest is ever imported into this country, it would be a good buy for [less], but with the dollar price [higher], I doubt whether it will ever hit the shelves."

== Reviews ==
- Polyhedron #29
