= Amazon Mutual Wants You!: Volume One =

Role-playing game adventure

Amazon Mutual Wants You!: Volume One is a 1982 role-playing game adventure published by Dragon Tree Press.

== Contents ==
Amazon Mutual Wants You!: Volume One consists of four adventures in which the player characters are hired to recover the bodies of other adventurers who died in their own adventures, so that they can be resurrected by Amazon Mutual Life Insurance.

== Reception ==
Lewis Pulsipher reviewed Amazon Mutual Wants You!: Volume One in The Space Gamer No. 50. Pulsipher commented that "Virtually all modules from such manufacturers as TSR, Gamelords, and Midkemia are better buys for [the price] than Amazon Mutual."
