= Little Soldier Games =

Role-playing game publisher

Little Soldier Games was an American game company that produced role-playing games and game supplements.

== History ==
In 1975, Ed Konstant and David Perez opened a game store in Rockville, Maryland called The Little Soldier. Konstant and Perez also founded publishing company Little Soldier Games to capitalize on a burgeoning interest in both J.R.R. Tolkien's The Lord of the Rings, and the role-playing game Dungeons & Dragons that had just been published by TSR the previous year.

Their first product was a fantasy wargame called The Ringbearer, based on The Lord of the Rings. Little Soldier quickly received a cease and desist letter from United Artists, at the time the owner of the American rights to LotR.

Konstant and Perez then switched to Arthurian legend, publishing the role-playing game Knights of the Round Table in 1976.

The same year, Little Soldier Games also began producing third-party material for Dungeons & Dragons, releasing the first fantasy role-playing bestiary, The Book of Monsters, a 40-page compendium of 100 monsters that predated TSR's Monster Manual by a year. Phil Edgren, who owned a bookstore around the corner from The Little Soldier and who had some knowledge of mythical creatures, wrote the text of the book. The illustrations and cover art were done by Bob Charrette.

This was quickly followed by The Book of Demons (1976), The Book of Sorcery (1977), and The Book of Mystery (1978).

In 1978, Phil Edgren and Dan Bress founded Phoenix Games, and brought Little Soldier Games under the company banner. Using the Little Soldier imprint, Phoenix produced The Book of Shamans (1978), and the Book of Treasure (1978).

The new company also released a couple of new products, The Book of Fantasy Miniatures and Elementary, Watson. Gamescience paid for the printing costs of both products in exchange for the rights to the entire Little Soldier Games back-catalogue, and quickly republished condensed versions of all six books under their banner.

Phoenix Games went out of business in 1981, and with it went the Little Soldier Game imprint.

In 1990, Gamescience included the contents of all six The Book of... volumes in The Fantasy Gamers Compendium.
