= Brotherhood of the Bolt =

- Author: Wm. John Wheeler, Peter L. Rice
- Language: English
- Genre: Fantasy, RPG
- Publisher: The Companions
- Publication date: 1983
- Publication place: United States of America
- Pages: 40

Brotherhood of the Bolt is a generic fantasy horror role-playing game supplement published in 1983 by The Companions, the third in the five-part "Islandia Campaign" series.

== Plot summary ==
A wizard of the evil Brotherhood of the Bolt, Morlach the Malicious, plans to break into the Barrow of Shaltor Plain in order to find something that will either allow him to become a powerful lich, or to rise to power in the locality.

Several scenarios are detailed that a game-master can develop into a series of adventures. Plots include including an expedition to a tomb and an attempt to enter a guarded castle undetected.

The book also includes new traps, monsters and detailed histories and descriptions of non-player characters.

The scenarios are not keyed to any particular role-playing game system, so the game-master must choose a game system and adapt the material to it.

== Publication history ==
Peter L. Rice and Wm. John Wheeler, through their company The Companions, had previously published two adventures in the "Islandia Brotherhood Campaign", The Curse on Hareth (1982), and Plague of Terror (1983). Brotherhood of the Bolt was the third in this series, a 40-page book with three maps published in 1983, written by Rice and Wheeler with additional material by Ray Estabrook, Donna McKinnon, William R. Mohler, Matthew Needham, and Dennis O'Brien. The artwork was by Rice and Wheeler as well as John Carlson, Tom Cobb, Mary Coman, David J. Hutchins, Kevin LaChance, Matthew Needham, and Eric Pfusch.

Later in 1983, Rice and Wheeler followed this book with two more adventures in the Islandia Campaign series: Streets of Gems and Gems for Death.

== Reception ==
Ken Rolston reviewed this product twice in the pages of Dragon:

- In the January 1984 edition (Issue #81), Rolston admitted that the scenarios were not the most original, nor were the production values and writing style the most professional. But he thought that "the novelty and virtue of the supplement lies not in the dramatic situations, but in their organization... The layout and organization displays a command of advanced technique and enlightened awareness of GM needs." However, Rolston did point out that because the adventures were not designed for a specific game system, each gamemaster would have to "spend substantial time and effort in preparing Brotherhood of the Bolt for play." But Rolston concluded, "Nonetheless, given the quality of the presentation and fantasy atmosphere, and the relatively small cast of NPCs who must be adapted, the GM’s investment will be well repaid."
- In the July 1988 edition (Issue #135), Rolston called Brotherhood of the Bolt "excellent", but noted that the book was out of print.

In Issue 23 of Imagine, Mike Dean pointed out that because of the adventure's complexity and the necessity of adapting it to a role-playing system, it "will provide your group with many sessions of play, but only if you are prepared to put in the necessary time and work for conversion and full understanding of the plots running through each of them."

Ken Rolston reviewed Brotherhood of the Bolt in White Wolf #40 (1994) and stated that "In Brotherhood of the Bolt, everything is described in this detail, so important bits aren't clumsily telegraphed to players. The piquant charm of dangerous exploration retains its delicious suspense and uncertain mystery."
