= The Dragon Tree Spell Book =

Role-playing game supplement

The Dragon Tree Spell Book is a 1981 fantasy role-playing game supplement published by Dragon Tree Press.

== Contents ==
The Dragon Tree Spell Book is a supplement presenting 224 spells, intended for use with fantasy role-playing games including Dungeons & Dragons.

== Reception ==
Lewis Pulsipher reviewed The Dragon Tree Spell Book in The Space Gamer No. 47. Pulsipher commented that "The other spell compendium I've seen, Spell Law [...] includes eight times as many spells as Spell Book, but many of those are simple variations. Spell Book may be more compatible with AD&D, but less with other FRPG than Spell Law. In view of the competition, Spell Book would be worth [somewhat less than its price], but [its price] is a little steep unless you're a spell collector of connoisseur."
