= Fungi of the Far Realms =

Role-playing game supplement

- Cover art by Shuyi Zhang
- Designers: Alex Clements
- Illustrators: Shuyi Zhang
- Publishers: Melsonian Arts Council
- Publication: 2019
- Genres: Fantasy role-playing

Fungi of the Far Realms is a fantasy role-playing game supplement released by the indie publisher Melsonian Arts Council in 2019 that describes a variety of fantastical fungi supposedly found in an imaginary world.

== Description ==
Fungi of the Far Realms describes over 200 fictional varieties of fungus that could be used in a fantasy role-playing game. The book is supposedly a reprint of a book by mycologist E. Q. Wintergarden, with watercolor illustrations. Each fungus is described in terms of habitat, appearance, taste, and aroma, with further descriptions of possible effects after ingestion. Some are poisonous, or act as an aphrodisiac or a hallucinogen. Some have multiple effects, such as the Psygoblin Mushroom, which causes psychic powers in goblins for 8 hours, and then causes a fatal brain aneurysm. (In all other races, the only effect is the fatal brain aneurysm.)

The book is rules agnostic, allowing the fungi it to be adapted to any role-playing game.

== Publication history ==
In 2019, Alex Clements and Shuyi Zhang used Kickstarter to crowdsource enough money to publish Fungi of the Far Realms. The resultant 240-page hardcover book, with text by Clements and artwork by Zhang, was published by Melsonian Arts Council in 2019.

== Reception ==
Michael Barnes commented, "It's a fictional piece of naturalism, but also a fecund spore-log of ideas and concepts that might inspire you to introduce mysterious, magical, and potentially deadly mushrooms into your game." Barnes noted that although it has very focused content, "Don't be fooled into thinking that a sourcebook this specific and focused isn’t useful – you might be surprised at the inspiration and creativity this guide offers." Barnes concluded, "I love the singular focus and commitment to an idea that Fungi of the Far Realms offers. ... there is solid usability here. It's one of the most unique RPG tomes I own, and I treasure it for that."

In his 2023 book Monsters, Aliens, and Holes in the Ground, RPG historian Stu Horvath commented "It's unlikely that a player will use this book in every session of a fantasy game." Horvath did point out that using this book could result in "a richer, deeper experience in one foraging-centric session." Horvath concluded, "The book is highly specialized material, but ... these fine details often make a game session memorable or otherwise special."
