= More Spells from Aldernon =

More Spells from Aldernon is a role-playing supplement published by Angstrum, Ink.

== Contents ==
More Spells from Aldernon is a supplement in which magic spells are presented for fantasy role-playing games.

== Publication history ==
More Spells from Aldernon is the second release in a series of unofficial small-press books by Anthony Arment about spells.

== Reception ==
More Spells from Aldernon was reviewed in White Wolf Inphobia #53 (March, 1995), rating it a 2 out of 5 and stated that "it is not much of a value considering its production quality. The contents are useful, so if you're a person who gets all the spell books you can, pick this up."
