= Player Character Records =

Tabletop role-playing game supplement

Player Character Records is a 1981 role-playing game supplement published by Canadex Games.

== Contents ==
Player Character Records consists of ten 11" x 17" character sheets intended for use with fantasy role-playing games.

== Reception ==
Lewis Pulsipher reviewed Player Character Records in The Space Gamer No. 44. Pulsipher commented that "These are poorly conceived and poorly executed; save your money."
