= The Village of Peddler's Ferry =

Role-playing game supplement

- Cover art by Raymond Maddox
- Designers: Bill Peschel
- Illustrators: Raymond Maddox
- Publishers: Entertainment Concepts Inc.
- Publication: 1983
- Genres: Fantasy

The Village of Peddler's Ferry is a role-playing game supplement published by Entertainment Concepts Inc. (ECI) in 1983 for use with either the fantasy play by mail (PBM) game Silverdawn, or the fantasy role-playing game Dungeons & Dragons.

== Contents ==
The Village of Peddler's Ferry describes a small border town built at the confluence of two rivers. Some notable personalities and places are described in detail.

== Publication history ==
In 1981, Jim Dutton designed the play-by-mail (PBM) game Silverdawn and founded Entertainment Concepts Inc. in order to publish it. In 1983, ECI released Village of Peddler's Ferry, a 12-page book designed by Bill Peschel with art by Raymond Maddox.

== Reception ==
In Issue 26 of Abyss (September 1983), Dave Nalle called it "essentially a passive village background with non-player characters and major spots described in a simple and direct format ... It is well crafted but neither unusual or particularly inspired." Nalle concluded, "This is certainly an item worth looking over, but don't rush out and buy it unless you think you'll need it."

In Issue 17 of Sorcerer's Apprentice, Michael Stackpole thought the book "reads easily but is a tad thin — even for $3." Stackpole also found the lack of detail frustrating, writing, "It tends to provide background for a campaign, and perhaps the lack of explicit detail will make it easier to use in ongoing campaigns, but I would still prefer a little bit more in the way of detailed adventures drawn from the descriptions presented." Stackpole concluded, "for the price, a Gamemaster can afford to take the time to add detailed scenarios for actual play.They're worth a look."
