= Gems for Death =

Role-playing game adventure

Cover art, 1983

Gems for Death is a generic role-playing game adventure published by The Companions in 1983, the final installment in the five-part "Islandia Campaign" series.

== Plot summary ==
Gems for Death is set in the archipelago of Islandia, where mysterious ships are kidnapping children. The player characters must find and rescue the children and put an end to the strange cult that is behind the kidnappings. The plot is divided into three mini-scenarios, and non-player characters are described in detail. In terms of game system, the adventure is generic, and must be adapted for a role-playing system such as Dungeons & Dragons or RuneQuest.

== Publication history ==
Peter L. Rice and Wm. John Wheeler, through their company The Companions, had previously published four adventures in the "Islandia Campaign": The Curse on Hareth (1982), Plague of Terror (1983), Brotherhood of the Bolt (1983), and Streets of Gems (1983).

Gems for Death was the fifth and final part of the Islandia series, a direct sequel to the previous adventure, Streets of Gems. The 48-page book with a center-bound color map was written by Rice and Wheeler with William R. Mohler and published in 1983.

== Reception ==
In the July 1985 edition of Dragon (Issue #99), Arlen P. Walker called this adventure "the model of organization", noting how the description of each room is divided into how long the characters spend inspecting it: Entrance (cursory glance), Rapid Glance, Detailed Look, Brief Search, and Thorough Search. Walker commented that this approach "can make the game seem more realistic." He also liked the organized descriptions of non-player characters, including a section called "Rationale" that gives the gamemaster enough background information "to accurately portray actions and reactions." Walker also admired the two timelines included in the adventure, which outline what will happen if the players do not take any action, and what will happen as the players begin to take action. As Walker noted, "the villains in this module are not simply waiting for the characters to arrive before doing anything. They have hopes and plans of their own. They were causing trouble before the player characters arrived, and they will continue doing so in an attempt to fulfill those plans." Walker also lauded the opening encounter, which he did not describe to avoid spoilers, but called "undoubtedly the strongest opening encounter I have ever seen." He did warn that this was a thinking person's adventure, saying, "If your players are accustomed to a great deal of (dice) roll-playing rather than (character) role-playing, this module might cause problems." He concluded with a strong recommendation: "This one's very good, folks. Don't miss it."
