= Lore of the Crypt Book V: Adventures =

Lore of the Crypt Book V: Adventures is a 1991 role-playing supplement published by Underworld Publishing.

== Contents ==
Lore of the Crypt Book V: Adventures is a supplement in which a campaign setting is presented along with two adventures and three small ideas for adventures.

== Reception ==
Keith H. Eisenbeis reviewed Lore of the Crypt Book V: Adventures in White Wolf #31 (May/June, 1992), rating it a 3 out of 5 and stated that "Both adventures offer many excellent ideas, guidelines and suggestions on which to base a full campaign and suggest many mini-adventures along the way to fill out the quests."
