= The Necromican =

The Necromican is a 1979 role-playing game supplement published by Fantasy Art Enterprises.

== Contents ==
The Necromican is a supplement in which a collection of 132 spells is introduced, designed for use in fantasy role-playing systems.

The Necromican is a spellbook supplement designed to provide an array of unconventional magical spells. The book offers a diverse selection of magical effects tailored for a wide range of character classes—including Mages, Clerics, Druids, Illusionists, and more. Some spells lean toward the eccentric, but the majority are crafted with applications that encourage tactical ingenuity, and the book offers spells that can be repurposed or reinterpreted in unexpected ways. It also includes illustrations that help visualize spell effects and areas of impact.

== Publication history ==
The Necromican was written by Erol Otus, Mathias Genser, and Paul Reiche III and published by Fantasy Art Enterprises in 1979 as a digest-sized 60-page book. They designed this supplement as well as Booty and the Beasts while they were still in high school.

Shannon Appelcline commented how "Otus didn't work on Hargrave's books after The Arduin Grimoire (and his art was removed from later printings of that first book), but he did go on to co-author two of his own Arduin-influenced 'generic fantasy' RPG supplements, Booty and the Beasts (1979) and The Necromican (1979), both published by super small press Fantasy Art Enterprises. This company was located in the hills north of the UC Berkeley campus, continuing to highlight the gaming and creativity of the San Francisco Bay Area in the late '70s. Most consider Fantasy Art's books even more gonzo than Arduin itself."

== Reception ==
Clayton Miner reviewed The Necromican for Pegasus magazine and stated that "This is definitely a product that judge and players will find interesting and somewhat amusing. The long term value of new material in a world makes this item well worth the purchase price."

Lawrence Schick commented that "Many are quite bizarre and/or humorous, for example, 'Rotate Body Parts,' which 'causes the target's body parts to change position in a random fashion.' We need more spells like this."

== Reviews ==
- Different Worlds (Issue 8 - Jun 1980)
