= Cities: A Gamemaster's Guide to Encounters and Other Rules For Fantasy Games =

Role-playing game supplement

Cities
- 1st edition, 1979
- Author: Stephen Abrams; Jon Everson
- Genre: Fantasy role-playing
- Publisher: Midkemia Press
- Publication date: 1979

Cities is a fantasy role-playing game supplement that was first published by Midkemia Press in 1979. The supplement was designed to be used with any role-playing game system, and provides information about using urban center as part of adventures. Midkemia published a second edition in 1980, Chaosium published a third edition in 1986, and Avalon Hill published a fourth edition in 1988 for the RuneQuest role-playing game. The various editions received positive reviews in game periodicals including The Space Gamer, Different Worlds, Dragon, White Dwarf, Casus Belli, and Games International.

== Description ==
Cities is a role-playing supplement that is "generic" in nature — that is, it is not designed for any specific role-playing game system. Two editions of the book were published by Midkemia Press, in 1979 and 1983; Chaosium published a third edition in 1986 titled Cities: Create and Explore Your Own Fantasy Communities.

The book provides information about urban centres — villages, towns and cities — that can be used by a gamemaster to design an adventure or campaign.

=== 1st & 2nd (Midkemia) editions ===
These editions were written by Stephen Abrams, April Abrams, and Jon Everson, and are divided into several sections. The first is "Encounters", a table of 28 encounters that might befall a party of adventurers — the town watch, an aristocrat, pilgrims, etc. Each encounter also has several specific events that can be used as story hooks to draw the characters into an adventure. For example, "Characters see a slaver beating a slave."

The second section, "Cities, Towns and Villages: Building Your Own", provides details on how the gamemaster can design either a small village of up to 400 people, or —using a different system — how to design a town or city. These include details of the open market or bazaar, and typical businesses and shops that would be found, in three economic stratas: wealthy, merchant and poor. There are also descriptions of several specialized urban centres such as a fishing village.

The third section, "City Catch-up Tables", is a series of tables to randomly determine how a character spends his or her time when not involved in an adventure, including employment status and earnings, savings and weekly costs. There are also tables to indicate whether an unusual event has happened to the character such as illness, being accused of a crime, or offending someone.

The appendices provide a variety of tables and charts that cover a number of subjects, including information a selection of inns and taverns, stables, and occupational backgrounds.

=== 3rd (Chaosium) edition ===
The third edition was written by Stephen Abrams and Jon Everson, and follows a structure similar to the first two editions. The first section is still "Encounters", although the number and type of encounters has been expanded.

The second section, "Populating Villages, Towns and Cities", is a set of charts and guidelines for randomly developing an urban area with shops and residences.

The third section, "Character Catch-up", serves the same purpose as the first two editions.

=== 4th (Avalon Hill) edition ===
The fourth edition was published by Avalon Hill as RuneQuest Cities in 1988 for the RuneQuest role-playing game.

== Publication history ==
Cities was written by Stephen Abrams and Jon Everson, and was published by Midkemia Press in 1979 as 72-page book. The second edition was published in 1980 with a two-color cover and again in 1982 with a color cover, and the third edition was published in 1986 by Chaosium as a 64-page book.

== Reception ==
In the November 1980 edition of The Space Gamer (No. 33), Richard A. Edwards thought the first edition was "a great addition to any game master's library of fantasy playing aids."

In the October–November 1982 edition of Different Worlds (Issue 25), Greg Stafford and Anders Swenson reviewed the second edition of the supplement and gave the book a strong recommendation, saying, "This is a key volume for any gamemaster who is seriously interested in city gaming."

In the August 1983 edition of Dragon (Issue 76), Ken Rolston had words of praise for Midkemia's second edition, commenting, "I recommend that all campaign gamemasters examine Midkemia's products; they will be pleasantly surprised by the lucidity of the presentation and the wealth of information and ideas they will find for town-based FRP gaming." Three years later, in the August 1987 edition issue, Ken Rolston called the third edition "an essential reference for any GM interested in FRPG medieval villages, towns and cities."

In Issue 83 of White Dwarf, Graeme Davis gave the supplement high praise, saying, "Renders the whole concept of the city scenario obsolete; here is a whole system which generates city adventures ad infinitum."

In the Spring 1987 edition of Abyss, Dave Nalle commented, "I have good and bad feelings about Cities. As a rule I'd rather see GMs given intelligent guidelines ... which they could adapt for the design of their own, well-planned and original city, yet I realize that many GMs may not have the time to invest in that sort of work." Nalle concluded, "Cities is a valuable resource which makes the use of random material much more palatable because of the high quality of thought which went into it."

In the July–August 1987 edition of Space Gamer/Fantasy Gamer (Issue No. 81), Jeff Albanese thought that Chaosium's third edition of this book was an improvement over the first two editions, saying, "All in all, Cities is wonderfully done, and you should go out and get it. The saying, 'The third time's a charm' certainly applies to this work!"

In the April 1987 edition of Casus Belli (Issue 37), Pierre Lejoyeux especially liked the random encounter tables, saying, "This chapter is full of ideas that the imagination of GMs can crystallize into adventures."

In Issue 3 of Games International, John Scott was disappointed, writing, "Frankly, my initial interest in the ideas behind this book faded very rapidly. A good referee won't need this material. A bad referee will certainly abuse it." Scott concluded by giving this a rating of 3 1/2 out of 5, stating, "If you do feel tempted to buy, insist on having a look between the covers for yourself – that should help you to make your own mind up quite quickly." Several issues later, Scott and Paul Mason agreed that the book "consists almost entirely of random encounter tables including all the diverse character types that one would expect to find in a traditional fantasy city, and also the kind of scene player characters observe (fire, public execution, drunks fighting), or the bizarre things which might befall them (chamber pot emptied onto character, finding an item, losing an item)." Scott and Mason concluded, "If you have only planned a small amount of detail for a city in your world, and you require some random tables to stimulate your ideas in play, then this book might provide you with some assistance. However, books of random encounter tables are just books of random encounter tables - don't expect imaginative genius."

In his 2023 book Monsters, Aliens, and Holes in the Ground, RPG historian Stu Horvath noted, "These rapid-fire, but often inconsequential encounters, create the illusion of a metropolitan churn, where player characters are but a handful out of thousands of inhabitants, all with their own agendas. A series of rolls opens many avenues for emergent storytelling ... The players are walking down the street, and already, they're trapped in the best kind of chaos that keeps compounding the longer they're out."

In a review of the Chaosium version of Cities in Black Gate, Jeffrey Talanian said "There are some exceptional city supplements out there, and this is one of the finest, in my opinion. So many seeds for further shenanigans! It's excellent [...] I think Chaosium did a great job with this book. It's a really useful resource for city play, full of the sort of randomness and unpredictability one would come to expect in an urban fantasy setting."
