= Search for the Crystal Sword =

Role-playing game supplement

Search for the Crystal Sword is a 1982 role-playing game adventure published by Entertainment Concepts.

== Plot summary ==
Search for the Crystal Sword is a fantasy adventure for any role-playing game, in which the players and their rivals compete to find the crystal sword and determine its ownership.

== Reception ==
Thearin R. Wendel reviewed Search for the Crystal Sword in The Space Gamer No. 62. Wendel commented that "This module has very few weak points. If you like working and adding to any module, you will appreciate this adventure."
