= No Honour in Sathporte =

Role-playing game supplement

No Honour in Sathporte is an adventure published by Chaotic Intellect Products in 1983 for the fantasy role-playing game Advanced Dungeons & Dragons.

== Description ==
The player characters, who reside in the town of Sathporte, are hired by the wife of a merchant to retrieve her son, who has run away to join the local thieves' guild. The players must infiltrate the thieves' complex, find the son, and return with him even if he objects. Not all is as it seems, and the players will be confronted with unexpected twists in the plot as they proceed.

Although not licensed by TSR, the adventure is designed to be used with the rules from TSR's Advanced Dungeons & Dragons game. A number of aids are printed, including some maps of rooms scaled 1"=5' that can be cut out and used with miniature figurines, and seven pages of blank character sheets.

== Publication history ==
No Honour in Sathporte, published by Chaotic Intellect Products (U.K.) in 1983, was written by Christopher Read, with artwork by Stephen Ball, Liz Martin, and Pete Sharpe, as a 28-page book enclosed in a cardstock liner. Relevant maps for the gamemaster are printed on the reverse of the liner.

Chaotic Intellect Products planned to release a guide to the town and its important non-player characters as well as more adventures set in the town, but no further products were ever published.

== Reception ==
In the March 1984 edition of Imagine (Issue 12), Doug Cowie did note there was a lack of introductory information for the gamemaster, and thought the layout "could be a bit slicker". But overall, he liked the adventure, stating, "Chaotic Intellect have put together a good product in Sathporte. The adventure is interesting and challenging, and the various play aids provided show some originality as well as being useful."
