= The Dungeon Trap Handbook =

Role-playing game supplement

The Dungeon Trap Handbook is a 1981 fantasy role-playing game supplement published by Reilly Associates.

== Contents ==
The Dungeon Trap Handbook is a publication of 38 tables that can be used for randomly generating traps.

== Reception ==
Lewis Pulsipher reviewed The Dungeon Trap Handbook in The Space Gamer No. 47. Pulsipher commented that "These tables are okay, showing commendable attention to detail, but they are in no way outstanding. They would have made a decent article in a magazine inclined to the nuts-and-bolts of role-playing games. But [the price] for less than 5,000 words is outrageous."
