= Medieval France (White Rose Publishing) =

Role-playing game supplement

Medieval France is a 1994 role-playing game supplement published by White Rose Publishing.

== Contents ==
Medieval France is a supplement in which a detailed and historically grounded medieval setting is presented. The book delves into the realities of medieval life—starving peasants, political intrigue, and the social structures that shaped everyday existence. The book opens with a geographical overview, followed by a history of France from the fall of Rome to 1500 A.D., highlighting key events, power struggles, and crusades. It then explores feudal society in depth, offering accounts of daily life, trade practices, student riots, religious persecution, and the roles of women and Jewish communities. Warfare and tournaments are also covered with realism. A section on legends brings in folklore from the Charlemagne Cycle to tales of werewolves and lost cities. The most substantial portion is the Locations section, which divides France into regions, each with maps and detailed entries on towns and cities—Paris alone receives seven pages and a double-page map. The book concludes with practical tools: timelines, pronunciation guides, name lists, weights and measures, and a bibliography. With no system-specific statistics, the material is adaptable to any RPG framework.

== Publication history ==
Medieval France was designed by Lisa J. Steele and published by White Rose Publishing as a 286-page sourcebook.

Steele has been a criminal defense attorney and author with an interest in medieval history, leading her to author the White Rose Publishing sourcebooks Fief and Medieval France.

== Reception ==
Ken & Jo Walton reviewed Medieval France for Pyramid magazine and stated that "A word of warning - if you're expecting a glossily packaged product, you'll be disappointed. The book is simply bound in colored card (though the bird's-eye-view drawing of medieval Paris is rather striking). The interior illustrations (mostly of historical buildings) are adequate, but not always very well reproduced. Where this book wins is on the quality of the writing, the depth of coverage of the subject, and the sheer quantity of material present."
