= Briarwood Castle =

Role-playing game supplement

Briarwood Castle is a 1989 role-playing game supplement published by Mayfair Games.

== Contents ==
Briarwood Castle is a supplement in which castle plans and details of the inhabitants are provided.

== Publication history ==
Briarwood Castle was written by Jeff R. Leason and Thomas R. Cook, with a cover by Robert Gould, and illustrations by Jerry O'Malley, and was published by Mayfair Games in 1989 as a boxed set with a 40-page booklet and a 24-page booklet, and two maps.

== Reception ==
Ian Marsh reviewed Briarwood Castle for Games International magazine, and gave it 2 stars out of 5, and stated that "Briarwood Castle will probably be used once in a campaign and then forgotten [...] But for referees who are in need of a castle to fill out a bit of their campaign world it will at least save the time it takes to design their own castle."
