= Lore of the Crypt Book II: Monsters and NPCs =

1991 role-playing supplement

Lore of the Crypt Book II: Monsters and NPCs is a 1991 role-playing supplement published by Underworld Publishing.

== Contents ==
Lore of the Crypt Book II: Monsters and NPCs is a supplement in which more than 30 new monsters are presented, along with information on how to create new monsters.

== Reception ==
Keith H. Eisenbeis reviewed Lore of the Crypt Book II: Monsters and NPCs in White Wolf #31 (May/June, 1992), rating it a 3 out of 5 and stated that "The monsters can be easily incorporated into any game system and range from the very weak to the immensely powerful. The NPCs are well-detailed and are useful as they each represent distinctive personalities which present many adventure hooks for the characters to pursue."
