= The Curse on Hareth =

Role-playing game supplement

The Curse on Hareth is a generic role-playing game adventure published by The Companions in 1982, the first in the five-part "Islandia Campaign" series.

== Plot summary ==
The adventure, designed for beginning players, is set in the village of Hareth, and involves several mini-scenarios, including a roaming band of thieves, a forgotten shrine, a wizard's abandoned mansion, and an old keep. In terms of game system, the adventure is generic, and must be adapted to the rules of a role-playing system such as Dungeons & Dragons or RuneQuest.

== Publication history ==
The Curse on Hareth was the first adventure in the five-part "Islandia Campaign" created by Peter L. Rice and Wm. John Wheeler through their company The Companions. Rather than a bound book, the adventure was published in 1982 as 74 loose-leaf three-hole sheets contained between two cardstock sheets, with two folded 11" x 16" sheets and one 17" x 22" color map, with illustrations by David J. Hutchins, Kevin McKeen, Diane Moran, Peter L. Rice, Beth Ann Warner, and Wm. John Wheeler, and cartography by Tom Cobb, Peter L. Rice, Patrick Rowland, and Wm. John Wheeler.

The four other Islandia Campaign adventures that followed were all published in 1983: Plague of Terror, Brotherhood of the Bolt, Streets of Gems, and Gems for Death.

== Reception ==
In Issue 62 of The Space Gamer, Kelly Grimes thought the adventure was both good value, and good for beginning players, saying, "All things considered, it is well worth the price, especially for a beginning group of characters, although any group should find it enjoyable."

In the February 1985 issue of Imagine (Issue 23), Mike Dean warned that because the adventure was complex and would require adaptation to a role-playing system, "these modules will provide your group with many sessions of play, but only if you are prepared to put in the necessary time and work for conversion and full understanding of the plots running through each of them."

== Reviews ==
- Sorcerer's Apprentice #16
