= The Quest (supplement) =

Role-playing game supplement

The Quest is a 1984 fantasy role-playing game supplement published by Icarus Games.

== Contents ==
The Quest is a book dealing with the design of heroic quest adventures for fantasy roleplaying games.

== Reception ==
David Dunham reviewed The Quest in Space Gamer No. 71. Dunham commented that "This is a unique book; I know of no other which assists in scenario design. It covers its subject matter well. While by its very nature its use is limited, I recommend it as a good way to bring serious quests into an FRP campaign."
