= The Handbook of Traps and Tricks =

Tabletop role-playing game supplement

The Handbook of Traps and Tricks is a 1981 role-playing game supplement published by Dragon Tree Press.

== Contents ==
The Handbook of Traps and Tricks is a compendium of traps mostly intended to be used with dungeons.

== Reception ==
Aaron Allston reviewed The Handbook of Traps and Tricks in The Space Gamer No. 43. Allston commented that "A good supplement - but wait for the price to go down."

== Reviews ==
- Casus Belli #84 (Dec 1994)
