= Lore of the Crypt Book III: Spells =

Lore of the Crypt Book III: Spells is a 1991 role-playing supplement published by Underworld Publishing.

== Contents ==
Lore of the Crypt Book III: Spells is a supplement in which 123 spells of various levels are presented.

== Reception ==
Keith H. Eisenbeis reviewed Lore of the Crypt Book III: Spells in White Wolf #31 (May/June, 1992), rating it a 3 out of 5 and stated that "The spell descriptions are a bit vague in some areas, lacking clear information about range and area of effect [...] A very few spells may be a bit unbalanced as need to be introduced into a campaign with care as they have permanent or far-reaching effects."
