= Deception at Dasa =

1989 role-playing game adventure

Deception at Dasa is a 1989 role-playing game adventure published by Mayfair Games.

== Plot summary ==
Deception at Dasa is a supplement in which the opponent is a demigod and the player characters will need a powerful artifact to defeat him.

== Publication history ==
Deception at Dasa was written by Terry Randall, with a cover by Robert Gould, and illustrations by Jerry O'Malley, and was published by Mayfair Games in 1989 as a boxed set with two 32-page booklets, a map, and a large color map.

== Reception ==
Ian Marsh reviewed Deception at Dasa for Games International magazine, and gave it 2 stars out of 5, and stated that "For those players and referees [...] that are satisfied with the usual fare provided by Invincible Overlord, the snippets of information will probably help build the series into a usable campaign. But at what cost ... ?"
