= Midkemia Press =

Role-playing game company

Midkemia Press is an American game company that produced fantasy role-playing game supplements in the early 1980s. Today it exists as a rights holder for its principal campaign setting, the land of Midkemia.

== History ==
In the mid-1970s, Conan La Motte was a student at the University of California at San Diego and a member of the Triton Game Club at the university. In 1975 La Motte shared a copy of the new fantasy role-playing game Dungeons & Dragons with the other wargamers, and while it was well-received, La Motte thought a campaign setting was needed and soon produced The Tome of Mid-Kimia, a small booklet that defined the "Land of Darkening Shadows", described some adventures, and copied some tables from the original D&D rules.

The gamers soon started to make their own house rules for the campaign setting of Midkemia, and these were published in a small book titled The Tome of Midkemia. In 1976, two members of the group, Steve Abrams and Jon Everson, collected all of the house rules and details of Midkemia into the First Midkemia Campaign. About this time, Raymond Feist joined the group.

As part of the on-going campaign, La Motte and Everson created a complete city for play, and other gamers in the group followed suit.

Abrams and Everson decided in 1979 that the time was right to market some of their role-playing material. They originally called the company Abrams & Everson, but after getting permission of La Motte to use the term "Midkemia", they formed Midkemia Press. Their first product was Cities, a book for "creating a city experience through nested random tables." The book proved popular, and has remained in print for over 40 years.

Artwork was provided by Mary Coman, Richard Spahl, April Apperson and Raymond Feist, and they were all brought into the company as partners.

Midkemia's second product was The City of Carse, principally written by Feist. The company went on to publish several more role-playing supplements, but Feist eventually left the company after his novels set in Midkemia became bestsellers.

In the wake of the slump in RPG sales in 1983, Midkemia Press stopped publishing, but has remained a rights holder for Midkemia game products, which they share with Feist.

In 1993, Midkemia licensed the computer RPG Betrayal at Krondor, which was named Best Game of the Year by Computer Gaming World.

To present day, Midkemia remains in business, and sells PDF copies of their works via their website.

== Publications ==
- Cities: A Gamemaster's Guide to Encounters and Other Rules For Fantasy Games (1979)
- The City of Carse (1980)
- Tulan of the Isles (1981)
- Thieves' World (1981)
- Jonril: Gateway to the Sunken Lands (1982)
- Towns of the Outlands (1981)
- The Black Tower (1981)
- Heart of the Sunken Lands (1983)
- The Village of Hoxely (in Sorcerer's Apprentice #17) (1983)
