= Places of Mystery II: Alluring Alcoves =

Tabletop role-playing game supplement

Places of Mystery II: Alluring Alcoves is a supplement published by The Companions in 1984 for use with fantasy role-playing games.

== Contents ==
Places of Mystery II: Alluring Alcoves is a supplement which provides detailed descriptions of indoor settings that can be used by gamemasters to supplement their role-playing adventures. Ten rooms are described, from the mundane (jail cell, garderobe) to the exotic (great chamber, treasury). Floor plans scaled for 25 mm miniatures are provided for the larger rooms. The book also includes descriptions of several traps and guardian monsters. Alluring Alcoves does not use the rules for any particular role-playing game such as Dungeons & Dragons or RuneQuest, leaving the gamemaster free to use the material with any role-playing game.

== Publication history ==
In 1983, The Companions, a games company in Bath, Maine, published the first of four supplements describing various settings for role-playing games, Places of Mystery I: Chilling Chambers. The following year, The Companions published a sequel, Places of Mystery II: Alluring Alcoves, that contains a cardstock folder holding 28 loose-leaf three-hole punched pages and several 17" x 11" maps, designed by Lew DeRoche, David Hutchins, Patricia Hutchinson, Dennis O'Brien, Peter L. Rice and Wm. John Wheeler. Two more supplements in the series followed: Places of Mystery III: Sylvan Settings (1985), and Places of Mystery IV: Highroad.

== Reception ==
In Issue 23 of Imagine, Mike Dean reviewed the first three supplements in the Places of Mystery series, and preferred Places of Mystery III: Sylvan Settings, saying, "Of the three sets, the third is probably the best and most useful, but much of the material in sets I and II is equally so, especially for the novice GM."
