= Silverdawn =

Fantasy play-by-mail game

- Designers: Jim Dutton
- Publishers: Entertainment Concepts, Inc.
- Years active: 1981 to unknown
- Genres: role playing, play-by-mail
- Languages: English
- Systems: Human-moderated
- Players: No limit
- Playing time: Open-ended (no limit)
- Materials required: Instructions, order sheets, turn results, paper, pencil
- Media type: Play-by-mail

Silverdawn is a fantasy role-playing play-by-mail game (PBM) that was published and moderated by Entertainment Concepts, Inc. (ECI) in 1981.

== Description ==
The setting was the world of Nyarna, and the adventure began in Valapar, "capital city of the Golden Empire". . In the human-moderated, open-ended game, players generated characters, choosing from four classes: cleric, fighter, ranger, and thief, from different races (including one called Haffers, apparently a cross between a human and halfling) and with various attributes. Magic users of four types were also available and part of game setup involved selecting spells and weapons.It was a solitaire game, with no interaction with other players. Although the game system assumed players will be "champions of Good", the flexible order sheet enabled players to pursue the opposite, which some players did.

Players submitted up to three pages of text per turn to the gamemaster and received a turn result as 1–3 pages of narrative prose describing the result with Gamemaster Notes for attribute changes and other communications. In 1985, costs for a single character setup were $5.00 with $3.00 per turn.

== Publication history ==
Jim Dutton designed Silverdawn and founded ECI in order to publish it. ECI began advertising Silverdawn in July 1981 and gameplay started four months later. Silverdawn was the company's first game (followed by Star Trek, the Correspondence Adventure in October 1982).

== Other adventures ==
In 1983, ECI released a mini-setting, The Village of Peddler's Ferry, that could either be used with the Silverdawn game system, or with the rules for Dungeons & Dragons. Critic Dave Nalle called it "essentially a passive village background with non-player characters and major sports described in a simple and direct format ... It is well crafted but neither unusual or particularly inspired." After its release, ECI founder Jim Dutton reported that the company would be releasing four more modules: The Village of North Landing, Long Live the King, The Crystal Domes and Wizards Island. However, only Long Live the King and Wizard's Island were released.

== Reception ==
In the October–November 1983 issue of Fantasy Gamer W.G. Armintrout concluded that the game was "the best commercial RPG in the play-by-mail field that I'm aware of. The game works smoothly. The adventures are fun. The game mastering is fair. ECI is reliable and dependable. I had fun with the game. I recommend it".

In the January–February 1985 issue of Paper Mayhem, John W. Kelley Jr. stated that the personally-written turn translated to significant work for a reasonable price, noting that the game was "broad in scope, flexible to the whims of individual players, and about as realistic as fantasy is supposed to get". Kelley found fault in a tendency of the company to keep characters alive, even after a lethal adventuring event, and also noted the relatively longer turnaround times for turns and waning newsletter with turns, for example, resulting from the publisher's success and expansion, which detracted from the excitement of the game. Kelley concluded, "All problems aside, though, Silverdawn is a game worth playing at least once."

== See also ==
- List of play-by-mail games

== Bibliography ==
- Armintrout, W. G. (Oct–Nov 1983). "Featured Review: Silverdawn". Fantasy Gamer. No. 2. pp. 11–13.
- Dutton, Jim (Oct–Nov 1983). "Company Report: Entertainment Concepts, Inc". Fantasy Gamer. No. 2. p. 12.
- Entertainment Concepts Inc. (August 1982). "Silverdawn". Space Gamer. No. 54. p. 40.
- Kelly Jr., John W. (Jan–Feb 1985). "Silverdawn: A Review". Paper Mayhem. No. 10. pp. 27–28.
- Loth, John Kevin (March–April 1986). "A PBM Primer". Paper Mayhem. No. 17. p. 42.
