= Aesheba: Greek Africa =

1987 tabletop game supplement

Aesheba: Greek Africa is a 1987 tabletop game supplement published by New Infinities Productions.

== Contents ==
Aesheba: Greek Africa is a supplement in which a campaign setting depicts Africa through the lens of ancient Greek knowledge and mythology, detailing Greek colonies, native African kingdoms, untamed wilderness regions, and rules for African-style magic.

== Publication history ==
AEsheba: Greek Africa was written by Robert J. Blake, Frank Mentzer, and Jeff O'Hare, with a cover by David Cherry and published by New Infinities Productions Inc., in 1987 as a 96-page book with a large color map.

== Reviews ==
- GM #1
- Papyrus (Issue 9 - 1993)
- Computer and Video Games

== See also ==
- Card game
- Board game
