= The Plateau: Capital of Evil =

Role-playing game adventure

The Plateau: Capital of Evil is a 1982 role-playing game adventure published by Entertainment Concepts.

== Contents ==
The Plateau: Capital of Evil is an adventure in which the player characters must stop an unknown evil.

== Reception ==
Thearin R. Wendel reviewed The Plateau Capital of Evil in The Space Gamer No. 62. Wendel commented that "I think it is a very worthwhile adventure for the GM who doesn't mind creating his own NPCs, magical item strength, and monsters."
