= Places of Mystery III: Sylvan Settings =

Tabletop role-playing game supplement

- Publishers: The Companions
- Publication: 1985
- Genres: Role-playing

Places of Mystery III: Sylvan Settings is a supplement published by The Companions in 1985 for use with fantasy role-playing games.

== Contents ==
Places of Mystery III: Sylvan Settings describes detailed outdoor settings such as a Viking burial longship, a ring of sacrificial oak trees, and a marsh, each of which can be used by gamemasters to supplement their role-playing adventures. Each area is accompanied by a map scaled for 25 mm miniatures. The book also includes descriptions of several traps and poisons. Sylvan Settings does not use the rules for any particular role-playing game such as Dungeons & Dragons or RuneQuest, leaving the gamemaster free to use the material with any role-playing game.

== Publication history ==
In 1983, The Companions, a games company in Bath, Maine, published the first of four supplements describing various settings for role-playing games, Places of Mystery I: Chilling Chambers. This was followed by Places of Mystery II: Alluring Alcoves in 1984, and Places of Mystery III: Sylvan Settings in 1985, a 32-page saddle-stapled softcover book designed by Terry DeRoche, Larry Hamilton, Chris Hewish, Patrick Hills, Mike Lawson, Edward Nutter, Dennis O'Brien, Scott Ramsay, Peter L. Rice, Gig Weeks, Bud Wellington, and Wm. John Wheeler, with illustrations by John J. Leavitt, Peter L. Rice, and Patrick Rowland. One more supplement in the series followed in 1986, Places of Mystery IV: Highroad.

== Reception ==
In Issue 23 of Imagine, Mike Dean reviewed the first three supplements in the Places of Mystery series, and preferred Places of Mystery III: Sylvan Settings, saying, "Of the three sets, the third is probably the best and most useful, but much of the material in sets I and II is equally so, especially for the novice GM."
