= Lore of the Crypt Book I: Magic Treasures =

Lore of the Crypt Book I: Magic Treasures is a 1991 role-playing supplement published by Underworld Publishing.

== Contents ==
Lore of the Crypt Book I: Magic Treasures is a supplement in which more than 250 magic items are described.

== Reception ==
Keith H. Eisenbeis reviewed Lore of the Crypt Book I: Magic Treasures in White Wolf #31 (May/June, 1992), rating it a 3 out of 5 and stated that "Many of the magic items included here are variations on items from a variety of game systems, but some interesting original ones are also presented. These items can be used by the gamemaster to add a bit of the unknown to a campaign in which the players seem to know more about the magic items than he does."
