= Lore of the Crypt Book IV: New Rules, Races, and Classes =

Lore of the Crypt Book IV: New Rules, Races, and Classes is a 1991 role-playing supplement published by Underworld Publishing.

== Contents ==
Lore of the Crypt Book IV: New Rules, Races, and Classes is a supplement in which many new suggestions are included to improve gameplay.

== Reception ==
Keith H. Eisenbeis reviewed Lore of the Crypt Book IV: New Rules, Races, and Classes in White Wolf #31 (May/June, 1992), rating it a 3 out of 5 and stated that "Perhaps the most ambitious of these possible rules additions is the inclusion of a spell point or mana system for the casting of spells."
