= Roshia's Gauntlet (Code of the Rats) =

Roshia's Gauntlet (Code of the Rats) is a 1991 role-playing adventure published by Far Reaches.

== Plot summary ==
Roshia's Gauntlet (Code of the Rats) is an adventure in which the player characters must deal with tricks and traps in a dungeon as a test against a sorceress.

== Publication history ==
Roshia's Gauntlet (Code of the Rats) was the first game supplement published by small publisher Far Reaches.

== Reception ==
Stewart Wieck reviewed Roshia's Gauntlet (Code of the Rats) in White Wolf #28 (Aug./Sept., 1991), rating it a 2 out of 5 and stated that "Though a dungeon-crawl of the worst kind, this product will appeal to gamers who still enjoy the old style D&D modules that require players to reason out the means to circumvent traps. The product even has a loose cover with a map of the dungeon on the inside. While the kinds of tricks and traps are varied, this product is a far cry from the kind of material that will win Far Reaches a place among the successful (or at least surviving) small game companies."
