= Stones of the Selt =

Role-playing game supplement

Stones of the Selt is a 1981 role-playing game adventure published by Dragon Tree Press.

== Contents ==
Stones of the Selt is the first of a planned series of five modules, each describing the islands located in the Epxae Islands campaign.

== Reception ==
Lewis Pulsipher reviewed Stones of the Selt in The Space Gamer No. 45. Pulsipher commented that "All in all, I can't recommend it, but if you see it in a shop you might take a look."
