= The Black Tower (Midkemia Press) =

Tabletop role-playing game adventure

The Black Tower is a 1981 fantasy role-playing game supplement published by Midkemia Press.

== Contents ==
The Black Tower is an adventure in which a castle is haunted by monsters and a horrifyingly transformed wizard who raided and captured the castle a century ago until they were defeated by the magic used by the defenders.

== Reception ==
Anders Swenson reviewed The Black Tower for Different Worlds magazine and stated that "The Black Tower is a full-sized 44 page book with a four-page dungeon map. The price is right and the adventure is a good buy."

Ronald Pehr reviewed The Black Tower in The Space Gamer No. 46. Pehr commented that "The Black Tower's drawbacks are certainly no more flagrant than those found in other game aids, and it is as much fun as similar adventure scenarios published by other companies. If you play D&D, and like 'dungeon-runs' with the accent on high-powered combat, you'll enjoy The Black Tower."
