= Adventurers' Guild Bounty Hunters' Handbook =

1988 role-playing game supplement

- Illustrators: Mike Bjornson
- Writers: Brett Dougherty, Todd Dougherty
- Publishers: Adventurers' Guild
- Publication: 1988
- Genres: Role-playing

Adventurers' Guild Bounty Hunters' Handbook is a supplement for fantasy role-playing games published by Adventurers' Guild in 1988.

== Contents ==
Adventurers' Guild Bounty Hunters' Handbook is a supplement for playing bounty hunter characters, and provides details of 20 wanted criminals.

== Publication history ==
Adventurers' Guild Bounty Hunters' Handbook was written by Brett Dougherty and Todd Dougherty, with artwork by Mike Bjornson, and was published by Adventurers' Guild in 1988 as a 48-page book.

== Reception ==
Stewart Wieck, the editor-in-chief of White Wolf magazine observed in 1988 that: "The supplement would have been more interesting if villains for a variety of levels had been presented, but many of the characters are very interesting. Several own new or unique magic items and each is given a monetary and experience value".
