= Places of Mystery I: Chilling Chambers =

Tabletop role-playing game supplement

Cover art by Patrick Rowland, 1983

Places of Mystery I: Chilling Chambers is a supplement published by The Companions in 1983 for fantasy role-playing games.

== Contents ==
Places of Mystery I: Chilling Chambers is a supplement descripting various indoor settings that can be used by gamemasters to supplement their role-playing adventures. Ten rooms are described, from the mundane (kitchen, army barracks) to the exotic (alchemist's lab, jail). Floor plans scaled for 25 mm miniatures are provided for each room. The book also includes descriptions of six traps and four poisons. Chilling Chambers does not use the rules for any particular role-playing game such as Dungeons & Dragons or RuneQuest, leaving the gamemaster free to use the material with any role-playing game.

== Publication history ==
In 1983, The Companions, a games company in Bath, Maine, published the first of four supplements describing various settings for role-playing games. Places of Mystery I: Chilling Chambers contains a cardstock folder cover backed with two maps that holds 24 loose-leaf pages. It was designed by Reid Climo, Matt Hawkins, Patricia Hutchinson, Dennis O'Brien, John Parvin, Peter L. Rice, and Bud Wellington, and edited by Wm. John Wheeler. Patrick Rowland provided the illustrations and cartography. Three more supplements in the series followed: Places of Mystery II: Alluring Alcoves (1984), Places of Mystery III: Sylvan Settings (1985), and Places of Mystery IV: Highroad.

== Reception ==
Anders Swenson reviewed Places of Mystery 1: Chilling Chambers for Different Worlds magazine and stated that "Chilling Chambers is a well-executed new concept in fantasy role-playing game aids. While many gamemasters who normally use published scenarios may be put off by having to actually construct a scenario just to use this product, experienced gamemasters certainly know by now that any commercial scenario needs more or less the same sort of preparation before it can be used for maximum effect in a campaign. For its price especially, this is a good buy."

In Issue 23 of Imagine, Mike Dean reviewed the first three supplements in the Places of Mystery series, and preferred Places of Mystery III: Sylvan Settings, saying, "Of the three sets, the third is probably the best and most useful, but much of the material in sets I and II is equally so, especially for the novice GM."
