= Enchanted Treasures =

Role-playing game supplement

Enchanted Treasures is a 1981 fantasy role-playing game supplement published by Reilly Associates.

== Contents ==
Enchanted Treasures is a supplement which describes 36 magic items intended to be used in fantasy role-playing games.

== Reception ==
Lewis Pulsipher reviewed Enchanted Treasures in The Space Gamer No. 47. Pulsipher commented that "7,000 words for [that price]? No FRP supplemental material is that good. Enchanted Treasures would have been an excellent 4-5 page magazine article (with proper editing), but 4-5 pages is a small fraction of a [...] magazine. It's terribly overpriced."
