= The Adventurers' Guild Bestiary =

Role-playing game supplement

- Illustrators: Mike Bjornson
- Writers: Brett Dougherty, Todd Dougherty
- Publishers: Adventurers' Guild
- Publication: 1987
- Genres: Role-playing

The Adventurers' Guild Bestiary is a supplement for fantasy role-playing games published by Adventurers' Guild in 1987.

== Contents ==
The Adventurers' Guild Bestiary is a supplement of fantasy role-playing game descriptions for 60 monsters of European myth and legend, intended to be used for high-level characters.

== Publication history ==
The Adventurers' Guild Bestiary was written by Brett Dougherty and Todd Dougherty, with art by Mike Bjornson, and was published by Adventurers' Guild in 1987 as a 16-page book.

== Reception ==
Stewart Wieck, the editor-in-chief of White Wolf Magazine, noted in 1988 that "While nicely formatted, the book doesn't present any especially unique creatures". He also noted that the creatures have fairly concise descriptions, but are noteworthy as they come from "actual mythologies".
