= Central Casting: Dungeons =

Central Casting: Dungeons is a 1993 role-playing supplement published by Task Force Games.

== Contents ==
Central Casting: Dungeons is a supplement in which assistance is provided for building dungeons.

== Publication history ==
Shannon Appelcline noted that after Task Force Games stepped back from role-playing game production, "They did publish a few more of Paul Jaquays Central Casting character books (1991) and even tried to expand the line into a franchise with Robert Sassone's Central Casting: Dungeons (1993) - a random dungeon generation book - but by the time the latter was published, the company had decided to dramatically change what they were producing for the roleplaying market."

== Reception ==
Rich Warren reviewed Central Casting: Dungeons in White Wolf #49 (Nov., 1994), rating it a 2.5 out of 5 and stated that "Central Casting's Dungeons does an adequate job of creating random dungeons. I recommend that you throw out the random bit and pick and choose ideas. Keep in mind, though, that you have 192 pages to look through. Also, publishing a supplement that creates long strings of combat-oriented encounters seems out of touch with the recent trend in story-driven games. Even the book's jokes and mood portray a Paleolithic style of gaming."

== Reviews ==
- Valkyrie #1 (Sept., 1994)
