= Skinwalkers & Shapeshifters =

Skinwalkers & Shapeshifters is a 1980 role-playing game supplement published by Morningstar Publishing.

== Contents ==
Skinwalkers & Shapeshifters is a supplement in which an overview of lycanthropy is offered, exploring the lore of were-creatures across the globe, and examining totemism practices. The book also includes guidance for painting werewolf miniatures.

Skinwalkers and Shapeshifters is a reference for players and gamemasters that includes real-world mythological lore and game mechanics relevant to lycanthropic characters, introducing various were-creature types, options for handling transformation, and a new Shapeshifter character class.

== Publication history ==
Skinwalkers & Shapeshifters was written by C.A. Hundtermark and Marjorie Jannotta and published by Morningstar Publishing Co. in 1980 as a digest-sized 72-page book.

== Reception ==
Clayton Miner reviewed Skinwalkers and Shapeshifters: A Guide to Lycanthropy for Players, Dungeon Master, and the Curious for Pegasus magazine and stated that "All in all, Skinwalkers and Shapeshifters is an interesting, informative, and well thought out product which should be of interest and be of much use to both players and Judges."
