= Streets of Gems =

Tabletop role-playing game adventure

Streets of Gems is a generic role-playing game adventure published by The Companions in 1983, the fourth in the five-part "Islandia Campaign" series.

== Plot summary ==
Streets of Gems is set in the port of Sontra, where the adventurers are attacked by a press gang before being drawn into several other plots including uncovering the trafficking of people being used as human sacrifices. The adventure is divided into three mini-scenarios, and includes detailed descriptions of non-player characters. In terms of game system, the adventure is generic, and can be adapted for any role-playing system such as Dungeons & Dragons or RuneQuest.

== Publication history ==
Peter L. Rice and Wm. John Wheeler, through their company The Companions, had previously published three adventures in the "Islandia Campaign": The Curse on Hareth (1982), Plague of Terror (1983), and Brotherhood of the Bolt (1983).

Street of Gems, published in 1983, was the fourth in the Islandia series, a 52-page book with a center-bound color map written by Rice and Wheeler with additional material by Terry Ashbury, Bill Gillman, Paul Theriault, and Gig Weeks, with illustrations by John Carlson, Mary Coman, Hannah Hinchman, Peter L. Rice, and Patrick Rowland.

The fifth and final adventure in the Islandia campaign, Gems for Death, was published in 1983.

== Reception ==
In Issue 23 of Imagine, Mike Dean pointed out that because of the adventure's complexity and the necessity of adapting it to a role-playing system, it "will provide your group with many sessions of play, but only if you are prepared to put in the necessary time and work for conversion and full understanding of the plots running through each of them."
