= The Adventurers' Guild Tome =

Role-playing game supplement

- Illustrators: Mike Bjornson
- Writers: Brett Dougherty
- Publishers: Adventurers' Guild
- Publication: 1987
- Genres: Role-playing

The Adventurers' Guild Tome is a supplement for fantasy role-playing games published by Adventurers' Guild in 1987.

== Contents ==
The Adventurers' Guild Tome is a sourcebook containing depictions of more than 300 various non-player characters, 1000 names for fantasy characters, and 100 diagrams for types of weapons and armor to scale.

== Publication history ==
The Adventurers' Guild Tome was written by Brett Dougherty, with art by Mike Bjornson, and was published by Adventurers' Guild in 1987 as a 44-page book.

== Reception ==
Stewart Wieck, the editor-in-chief of White Wolf Magazine, stated in 1988 that, although of "lesser quality, the character pictures could be used as visuals to help players focus on the fact that they are talking to an actual person, not a faceless bystander." He also observed that, "If you have trouble naming characters, then the list will do you good. The diagrams are interesting and apparently historically accurate.
