= Creature Creation =

Creature Creation is a 1986 role-playing game supplement published by Fugative Games.

== Contents ==
Creature Creation is a supplement in which a creature-generation system is designed for use with the company's Worldshaker world-building framework, and enables gamemasters to create semi-random monsters, plants, and organisms for any RPG setting. The publisher claims the system can produce virtually anything.

== Publication history ==
Creature Creation was published by Fugitive Games (U.K.) in 1986 as a booklet.

== Reception ==
Ste Dillon reviewed Creature Creation for Adventurer magazine and stated that "This product is a must for anyone who enjoyed Eon games' Quirks just for the sake of creating weird and wonderful life-forms, or for any GM wanting to personalize his campaign."
