= The Compleat Fantasist =

Tabletop role-playing game supplement

The Compleat Fantasist is a 1980 role-playing game supplement published by Dimension Six.

== Contents ==
The Compleat Fantasist is a play aid which provides guidelines on how to convert characters from each of the major fantasy role-playing game systems of the day to each other, including Advanced Dungeons & Dragons, RuneQuest, Tunnels & Trolls, and Arduin Grimoire.

== Reception ==
Ronald Mark Pehr reviewed The Compleat Fantasist in The Space Gamer No. 32. Pehr commented that "The charts, and a few of the words of wisdom, would have made a useful pamphlet [...] or a magazine article. If all that was promised for future volumes - magic, weapons, character classes - had been included, it might have been worth its price. As is, Compleat Fantasist gives far too little for that price."

Eric Goldberg reviewed The Compleat Fantasist in Ares Magazine #7 and commented that "The FRP playing aid market is replete with shoddy product, as many companies seek to cash in on the current craze. The Compleat Fantasist is one of the dregs of this field."
