= Starstone =

Fantasy role-playing game adventure

- Publishers: Northern Sages
- Publication: 1982
- Genres: Role-playing

Starstone is a fantasy role-playing adventure published by Northern Sages in 1982. Supposedly a "universal" adventure that could be used with any role-playing system, Starstone was an effort to create an unlicensed Dungeons & Dragons adventure.

== Description ==
Starstone is a fantasy campaign setting that the publisher claimed could be used with any set of role-playing rules such as Dungeons & Dragons or RuneQuest. Reviewer Robert Hulston disagreed, calling this claim "a thinly veiled disguise, for Starstone seems to have been designed primarily for use with the D&D game universe."

The book is divided into an introductory adventure and two scenarios that are all set in Starstone County, a troubled region that includes multiple villages, a dungeon inhabited by goblins, a mine run by dwarves, and the lair of a dragon.

=== Introduction: "Strange Goings on at Longbottom Down" ===
The adventurers are hired as caravan guards, but due to a broken bridge, the caravan is forced to divert to the village of Longbottom Down. The next morning, the caravan owner is missing, and the adventurers must find him.

=== Chapter 1: "Sardkirk" ===
The adventurers, having proven their worth, are hired to investigate disappearances near the village of Sardkirk. They find the main threat to be goblins in the nearby caverns of Broch.

=== Chapter 2: "Dolgold" ===
The adventurers investigate the rise of deadly rivalries in the village of Dolgold. Although the adventurers find ways to calm the troubles, their investigations also reveal clues as to the true cause of the troubles in Starstone County, which were to be the plot of the adventures published in the next installment, Ristenby Town.

== Publication history ==
In 1982, Paul Vernon wrote a fantasy role-playing scenario set in Starstone County called "Troubles at Embertrees" that was published in White Dwarf. Vernon followed up by writing two more adventures set in the same region, which were published as Starstone, a 40-page book with a removable map sheet that was released in the U.K. in 1982 by Northern Sages (U.K.) with a print run of three thousand copies. Artwork was by John Everett, Diane Hadfield, and Barrie Morton.

Although the adventures in Starstone were supposedly a lead-in to Vernon's next product, Ristenby Town, the sequel was never published.

== Reception ==
In the April 1983 edition of White Dwarf (Issue #40), Daniel Collerton admired the product, calling the scenarios "beautifully detailed and structured with background history, politics, family relationships and economics all given in addition to the usual monsters." Collerton's only quibble was that "its very completeness means that it requires several readings to grasp fully." He concluded by giving it an excellent overall rating of 9 out of 10, saying, "For those who prefer a coherent, highly detailed medieval milieu for their campaigns, Starstone could hardly be bettered. Even for those who don't like such a background, it still represents excellent value for the money merely as an example of meticulous campaign design. Very highly recommended."

In the July 1983 edition of Imagine (Issue #4), Robert Hulston thought highly of the product, saying, "Starstone will provide entertainment for many evenings, is exceptional value for money... and is highly recommended."

In the May 1985 edition of Dragon (Issue #97), Eric Pass was impressed with the amount of detail provided in the adventures, commenting, "Each is packed with enough information that the NPCs in the scenario know less about themselves that the reader does." He called the introductory adventure "excellent," saying that "it should be used as an example of creativeness within credulity." However, Pass did criticize the introduction for moving the players to the town of Ristenby, when information about that town was only to be published in the next installment of adventures. Nonetheless, he highly recommended the book, saying, "Starstone is one of the best-detailed modules I have examined. If you have the time and the inclination to sample superior module design, buy it."
