= Jonril: Gateway to the Sunken Lands =

Tabletop role-playing game supplement

Jonril: Gateway to the Sunken Lands is a 1982 fantasy role-playing game supplement published by Midkemia Press.

== Contents ==
Jonril: Gateway to the Sunken Lands details a large city designed to be compatible with fantasy role-playing games, which is inhabited by a variety of different characters.

== Reception ==
Kelly Grimes reviewed Jonril: Gateway to the Sunken Lands in The Space Gamer No. 61. Grimes commented that "Jonril is a very worthwhile setup. It is well put together, and can be used without too much pregame planning. It's well worth the money."

Anders Swenson reviewed Jonril: Gateway to the Sunken Lands for Different Worlds magazine and stated that "Jonril is a well-done, workmanlike adventure aid. it provides a complex, realistic city adequate to most role-playing needs I've come across. The authors have outdone themselves in weaving a net of relationships between the major inhabitants of Jonril. The town is well laid-out, and the businesses are realistically selected, placed, and described."
