= Wyrdworld 2: Wordesley =

Role-playing game supplement

- Writers: Marcus Streets
- Publishers: Strange Acorn Games
- Publication: 1987
- Genres: Role-playing

Wyrdworld 2: Wordesley is a generic fantasy role-playing game adventure published by Strange Acorn Games in 1987.

== Plot summary ==
Wyrdworld 2: Wordesley is an adventure in which the player characters in the town of Wordesley investigate an idol which has been stolen, as well as an evil cult. Rather than using a specific set of role-playing rules, this adventure is generic, and includes notes on how to convert it to popular RPGs of the time such as Advanced Dungeons & Dragons, RuneQuest, and Rolemaster.

== Publication history ==
In 1987, Strange Acorn Games published the first in what they hoped would be a series of RPG adventures, Wyrd World 1: Wintersfarne. They quickly followed this up the same year with Wyrdworld 2: Wordesley, a 32-page book by Marcus Streets. A further two adventures, Wyrdworld 3: West Haven and Wyrdworld 4: Whitewood, were planned, but were never published.

== Reception ==
In the May 1987 edition of White Dwarf (Issue #89), Graeme Davis thought the production values of this adventure maintained the solid if unspectacular fanzine quality of its predecessor, Wintersfarne. He likewise thought the computer-generated cartography "perfectly adequate." He did warn that because the adventure was generic, the gamemaster "will have to do a certain amount of preparation." He concluded with a positive recommendation, saying "Not one for the hack-and-slay brigade, but like Wintersfarne, worth a look if you happen to like thoughtful investigative adventures with the accent on roleplaying and problem solving rather than all-action dungeon bashes."
