= The City of Carse =

Tabletop role-playing game supplement

The City of Carse is a fantasy role-playing game supplement published by Midkemia Press in 1980.

== Publication history ==
The City of Carse was written by Stephen and April Abrams, with additional material by Lynn Willis. It is not designed for a specific role-playing game, so that the gamemaster can adapt it to any role-playing system.

Three editions were published:

- The first two editions, published by Midkemia Press, were both 79 typewritten pages in length.
- The third edition, published by Chaosium in 1986, had the title shortened to simply Carse. This edition was reduced from 79 to 56 pages, but due to the change from typewritten pages to a professionally typeset layout, it actually contained more material than the first two editions. A large full color map was included as well.

== Contents ==
The book details Carse, a free port city within the kingdom of Midkemia. Detailed descriptions of every building in the city are listed, including three temples dedicated to different religions. Notable inhabitants of each building are also described.

A random encounter table is included, as well as many maps and building floor plans.

== Reception ==
In the January 1986 edition of The Space Gamer No. 35, Elisabeth Barrington called the third edition published by Chaosium "One of the finest play aids I have come across. Recommended to any gamer who requires a medieval-styled city."

Robert Neville reviewed Carse for White Dwarf #84, and stated that "on the whole Carse is competently done, neatly-produced and well worthy of your attention if a well-detailed city is what you are after."

In the August 1988 edition of Dragon (Issue #136), Jim Bambra thought the layout of the 3rd edition was "easy to use, with each part of the city being presented as an area map annotated with each building’s function." Bambra found the descriptions to be a bit skimpy, commenting that "a more thorough integration of the background into the descriptions of the city would give Carse a more dynamic flavor." He also thought that the random encounters table needed more solid story hooks, saying, "These encounters, while containing colorful NPCs, give few hints as to how the NPCs are likely to react to the PCs, and it is left up to the GM to decide how to use any encountered character. More staging tips would have gone a long way toward making these encounters more vibrant." Despite the lack of detail, he concluded that the book paints "a picture of a believable fantasy city... If more attention had been paid to describing the atmosphere of the city and if tips on how to bring it to life were provided, Carse would be a very good pack. As it stands, Carse provides a good starting point for GMs willing to add the needed work to bring the city to life."

== Reviews ==
- Casus Belli #37 (April 1987)
