= The Burgundy Pit =

Tabletop role-playing game adventure

The Burgundy Pit is a 1981 fantasy role-playing game adventure published by Wilmark Dynasty.

== Contents ==
The Burgundy Pit is an adventure in which an illusionist hires the player characters to retrieve a magic item from a dungeon, after finding the location of an old enemy.

== Reception ==
Lewis Pulsipher reviewed The Burgundy Pit in The Space Gamer No. 48. Pulsipher commented that "The module is grossly overpriced. There is not much here, nor is the semi-professional nature of the production an excuse for astronomical price."
