= All the Worlds' Monsters =

Tabletop role-playing game supplement

- Volume 1 cover by George Barr.
- Designers: Steve Perrin; Jeff Pimper
- Publishers: Chaosium
- Publication: 1977 Volume 1; 1979 Volume 2; 1980 Volume 3
- Genres: Fantasy
- Systems: Dungeons & Dragons

All the Worlds' Monsters is a series of fantasy role-playing game supplements published by Chaosium from 1977 to 1980. They were republished in PDF format in 2016.

== Contents ==
Edited by Steve Perrin and Jeff Pimper, All the Worlds' Monsters is a fantasy game supplement that lists many monsters from the campaigns of Dungeon Masters across the US, none of which had been published for Dungeons & Dragons (D&D) before and most of which were original creations. There are three volumes, and the first volume predates the Advanced Dungeons & Dragons Monster Manual by several months:

- All the Worlds' Monsters - red booklet, 265 monstrous and dangerous creatures.
- All the Worlds' Monsters, Volume Two - blue booklet, 243 creatures from literature, fantasy, and nightmare.
- All the Worlds' Monsters, Volume III - yellow booklet, with details and game statistics for about 300 new monsters.

The PDFs contain additionally:

- Volume Two A conversion article by Ken St. Andre for Tunnels & Trolls, and The Perrin Conventions.
- Volume III An all-series index, and a RuneQuest stats conversion essay by Steve Perrin

== Reception ==
Clara Glowe reviewed All the Worlds' Monsters in The Space Gamer No. 14. Glowe commented that "about one of every six monsters is, or should be classified as dumb" but that "I still recommend this book. It will be a valuable aid to novice and expert alike."

Don Turnbull reviewed All the Worlds' Monsters for White Dwarf #5, and stated that "I would prefer the editors to have been a lot more discriminating - either they could have included fewer monsters [...] or filled the gaps with more worthwhile beasts from whatever source. In aiming for quantity I think they have sacrificed a degree of quality."

Don Turnbull reviewed All the Worlds' Monsters Volume II for White Dwarf #12, giving it an overall rating of 5 out of 10, and stated that "my conclusion is very much the same as for volume I. I with the editors had been a little more discriminating, ruthlessly chopping out the uninteresting and the 'randomly-generated' monster and perhaps lowering the price of the final version. But they have included more interesting monsters than did volume I and on the whole I can give this collection a marginally better recommendation."

Steve Jackson reviewed All the Worlds' Monsters, Volume III in The Space Gamer No. 29. Jackson commented that "Not the best-done monster book in the world [...] and a bit high-priced. If you liked previous volumes of All the Worlds' Monsters, you'll love this; it's more of the same. Otherwise, recommended mainly for diehard D&D people, or RuneQuest fans who want to populate their world with some rather silly creatures."
