= Wyrd World 1: Wintersfarne =

Role-playing game supplement

- Designers: Marcus Streets
- Illustrators: Shelagh Lewis
- Publishers: Strange Acorn Games
- Publication: 1987
- Genres: Role-playing

Wyrd World 1: Wintersfarne is a generic fantasy role-playing game (RPG) adventure published by Strange Acorn Games in 1987.

== Plot summary ==
Wyrd World 1: Wintersfarne is an adventure in which the player characters must discover why cattle and the people who guard them have been vanishing from the island town of Wintersfarne. Local rumours ascribe the disappearances to rustlers, bandits, or even a long-dead wizard.

== Publication history ==
Wyrd World 1: Wintersfarne was designed by Marcus Streets, with artwork by Shelagh Lewins, and was published by the British company Strange Acorn Games in 1987 as a 32-page book. Rather than using a specific set of role-playing rules, this adventure is generic, and includes notes on how to convert it to popular RPGs of the time such as Advanced Dungeons & Dragons, RuneQuest, and Rolemaster. This was the first adventure in a series that Strange Acorn planned to publish, all set in towns or villages starting with the letter "W": Wyrdworld 2: Wordesley, Wyrdworld 3: West Haven and Wyrdworld 4: Whitewood. However, only Wordesley was released.

== Reception ==
In the March 1987 edition of White Dwarf (Issue #87), Graeme Davis thought the production quality was good, up to "the standards that might be expected of a quality fanzine; the type is legible, the computer-drawn maps are plain but functional, and the interior art is quite reasonable." He also thought the plot was "novel and interesting," and he also thought "the adventure is based on thought and role-playing rather than mindless mayhem." He did warn that the adventure would need "careful preparation — the more so because it is systemless." Davis concluded that "Wintersfarne is an interesting adventure, and will be enjoyed by players who prefer thought, investigation and roleplaying to hack-and-slay [...] Within their limitations Strange Acorn Games have done very well. The next two in the series, Wordesely and West Haven, will be worth looking out for if they maintain the standards set by Wintersfarne."
