= Knights of the Round Table (role-playing game) =

Tabletop game

Knights of the Round Table is a role-playing game published by Little Soldier Games in 1976.

== Description ==
Knights of the Round Table is set in Arthur's Camelot. The combat system is simple and uses cards (included).

== Publication history ==
Knights of the Round Table was designed by Phil Edgren, with art by Bob Charette, and was published by Little Soldier Games in 1976 as a 64-page digest-sized book.

== Reception ==
Lew Pulsipher reviewed Knights of the Round Table for White Dwarf #6, and stated that "This is a relaxing change from the tac-nukes, lasers, and superhypnosis of D&D. Probably the skill level which can be imposed in Knights of the Round Table is not high, but the same is true of many other role-playing games. Speed and simplicity are sufficient compensation."

Lawrence Schick describes the game as a "Primitive early system".
