= Englewood, California =

Unincorporated community in California, United States

Englewood
- Unincorporated community
- Location in California Englewood (the United States)
- Coordinates: 40°23′48″N 123°56′20″W
- Country: United States
- State: California
- County: Humboldt
- Elevation: 364 ft (111 m)

Englewood (formerly Englevale) is an unincorporated community in Humboldt County, California, United States. It is located 0.5 miles (0.8 km) east-southeast of Redcrest, at an elevation of 364 feet (111 m). In 2009, the area was the site of a few homes and a derelict Eel River Sawmills mill.

Englewood post office was opened in 1880 "on the Davis place 7 miles from Camp Grant," with Henry D. Davis as postmaster. It operated from 1880 to 1891. The Englevale post office operated from 1893 to 1894.

H.S. Shaw was editor of the Englewood Star newspaper "some years before" 1888.

In August 1888, H.H. Niebur wrote in a newspaper article that he and his family had traveled, while "on a pleasure trip," from Phillipsville to Englewood, a distance of 22 miles, "mostly through redwoods, with very little oak, either white or red," passing over the mouth of the South Fork of the Eel River at then to the Englewood prairie. In the latter, they found the post office and a hotel kept by Mr. and Mrs. H. Davis "and a farm owned by Mr. Sears."
