= Abyss (magazine) =

Gaming magazine

- Abyss #22, art by Mike Cranford
- Editor: Dave Nalle
- Categories: Role-playing game
- Frequency: Bi-Monthly; Quarterly
- Founded: 1979
- Final issue: 1984
- Company: Ragnarok Games
- Country: US
- Based in: Washington, D.C.
- Language: English

Abyss was a gaming magazine first published in 1979, edited by Dave Nalle and published by Ragnarok Games. It was headquartered in Washington, D.C. and was published until 1984.

== Contents ==
Abyss was a bimonthly zine-type magazine focusing on fantasy role-playing games including New Ysgarth Rules (also published by Ragnarok Games) and Dungeons & Dragons. Each issue was twenty offset pages in length, with a reported circulation of about 175. Regular content included new fantasy monsters, character classes, magic items and spells; opinion pieces; and in every other issue, a mini-adventure. Later, the frequency of Abyss was switched to quarterly.

== Reception ==
In the June 1981 edition of Dragon, Dave Nalle reviewed his own magazine, saying, "The main weakness of Abyss is a tendency in some articles to deal with subjects which are too complex or too specific to be fitted well into any campaign. It also deals with some material which might not interest every reader."

In the July 1981 edition of The Space Gamer (Issue No. 41), Ronald Pehr commented on the difference between the magazine's stated desire to expand to new roleplaying games, and its actual content. "The publishers are creative, doing their best on an obviously minuscule budget, but it is difficult to recommend a magazine which won't please the majority of gamers. Abyss is trying to expand coverage of the gaming field, but to date most of the writers have limited themselves to D&D or New Ysgarth Rules."

Bill Pixley reviewed Abyss 17 for Pegasus magazine and stated that "The magazine is an excellent one, and I would heartily recommend subscribing to it for the useful and interesting information it presents."

In Issue 17 of Sorcerer's Apprentice, Michael Stackpole commented "It provides a forum for interesting short articles and scenarios that has shifted its focus recently, from being a magazine concerned with D&D supplemental material, to a magazine offering articles and scenarios suitable for use or translation into other games."
