= 1980 Origins Award winners =

List of award winners

The following are the winners of the 7th annual (1980) Origins Award, presented at Origins 1981:

== Charles Roberts Awards ==
Category	Winner	Company	Designer(s)
Best Pre-20th Century Game of 1980	Empires of the Middle Ages	SPI	
Best 20th Century Game of 1980	Crescendo of Doom	Avalon Hill	
Best Fantasy or Science Fiction Game of 1980	Azhanti High Lightning	GDW	
Best Computer Game of 1980	Temple of Apshai	Automated Simulations	
Best Initial Release of a Boardgame of 1980	Streets of Stalingrad	Phoenix	
Best Professional Magazine Covering Boardgames of 1980	Fire & Movement	Baron Publishing	
Best Amateur Magazine Covering the Hobby in General of 1980	HMS Review		
Gamers choice of 1980	Ace of Aces	Nova Games	

== The H. G. Wells Awards ==
Category	Winner	Company	Designer(s)
Best Historical Figure Series of 1980	Condotierre	Ral Partha	
Best Fantasy or Science Fiction Figure Series of 1980	Personalities	Ral Partha	
Best Vehicular Model Series of 1980	Micro Armor	GHQ	
Best Miniatures Rules of 1980	TacForce	GDW	
Best Roleplaying Rules of 1980	DragonQuest	SPI	
Best Roleplaying Adventure of 1980	Twilight Peaks	GDW	
Best Magazine Covering Miniatures of 1980	The Courier		
Best Magazine Covering Roleplaying of 1980	Journal of the Travellers Aid Society	GDW	
All Time Best Pre-Napoleonic Gunpowder Miniatures Rules of 1980	Renaissance Rules	WRG	
All Time Best Air Combat Miniatures Rules of 1980	Basic/Advanced Fighter	Lou Zocchi	

== Adventure Gaming Hall of Fame Inductee ==
- E. Gary Gygax
