= The Demon Pits of Caeldo =

The Demon Pits of Caeldo is a 1983 role-playing game adventure published by Gamelords for Thieves' Guild.

== Plot summary ==
The Demon Pits of Caeldo is an adventure in which mid-level player characters explore an abandoned castle as well the dungeons beneath it that are haunted by demons.

== Publication history ==
The Demon Pits of Caeldo was written by Kerry Lloyd and published by Gamelords in 1983 as 28-page book.

Shannon Appelcline explained that the company Phoenix Games "was where new RPG author Kerry Lloyd got his first book published, a 'generic fantasy' adventure called The Mines of Keridav (1979). He had a sequel, The Demon Pits of Caeldo, ready to go but Phoenix Games disappeared before the latter could be published." Appecline notes that Lloyd founded his own company Gamelords soon after, and that by 1983 "Notable books in these last years included: Haven: Secrets of the Labyrinth (1983), the long-delayed second supplement detailing the massive city; The Mines of Keridav (1983), a Thieves' Guild reprint of Kerry Lloyd's original publication; and The Demon Pits of Caeldo (1983), the never-printed adventure promised by Phoenix four years previous."
