= Haven: Secrets of the Labyrinth =

Role-playing game supplement

Haven: Secrets of the Labyrinth is a 1983 role-playing game supplement published by Gamelords for Thieves' Guild.

== Contents ==
Haven: Secrets of the Labyrinth is a supplement in which a campaign setting details the thieves' guilds of Haven City, with a particular focus on the Black Hand guild. As a sequel to Haven: The Free City, it also explores thieves' markets, mercenaries, major non-player characters, and provides guidelines for haggling.

== Publication history ==
Haven: Secrets of the Labyrinth was written by Janet Trautvetter, Kerry Lloyd, Kevin Hardwick, and Richard Meyer, and was published by Gamelords in 1983 as an 80-page book with 20 pages of cardstock map pieces.

Shannon Appelcline explained how by 1983 at Gamelords, "Notable books in these last years included: Haven: Secrets of the Labyrinth (1983), the long-delayed second supplement detailing the massive city; The Mines of Keridav (1983), a Thieves' Guild reprint of Kerry Lloyd's original publication; and The Demon Pits of Caeldo (1983), the never-printed adventure promised by Phoenix four years previous."

== Reviews ==
- Dragon #84 (Apr 1984)
