= Thieves' Guild 4 =

Fantasy role-playing game supplement

Thieves' Guild IV
- Designers: Richard Meyer; Kerry Lloyd
- Publishers: Gamelords
- Publication: 1981
- Genres: Fantasy RPG
- Parent games: Thieves' Guild

Thieves' Guild 4 is the third in a series of supplements published by Gamelords in 1981 for the fantasy role-playing game Thieves' Guild.

== Contents ==
Thieves' Guild 4 contains adventure scenarios for thief player characters who can choose to be either part of the city thieves' guild or the Black Hand splinter group. Two scenarios are included. One involves a cat burglary, while the other is about armed robbery. The scenarios both require information-gathering skills. New rules for perceptiveness and for how to follow and not be followed by other characters are included.

== Publication history ==
Gamelords published the fantasy role-playing game in 1980, and the produced a number of supplements for it that included scenarios and expanded rules. The third in this series of supplements was Thieves' Guild 4, designed by Richard Meyer and Kerry Lloyd, released in 1981.

== Reception ==
In Issue 46 of The Space Gamer (December 1981), Lewis Pulsipher commented "If thieves are your favorite character, you should subscribe to Thieves Guild." Pulsipher

Pulsipher also reviewed Thieves' Guild IV for White Dwarf #31, noting, ""Gamelords's products are not for everyone, but a boon to the minority of FRPers at whom they are aimed." Pulsipher concluded by giving this product a rating of 8 out of 10.

In Issue 17 of Abyss (February 1982), Dave Nalle commented, "At $5.95, the cost is not really too high compared with the rest of the market, and the material is unusually logical, if only moderately exciting."

John T. Sapienza, Jr. reviewed Thieves' Guild 4, Thieves' Guild 5, and Thieves' Guild VI for Different Worlds and stated that "even if you are not particularly interested in thieves for role-playing, the Thieves' Guild line is worth looking at for ideas."
