= Dwarven Halls =

Dwarven Halls is a 1985 role-playing game supplement published by Fantasy Games Unlimited for Swordbearer.

== Contents ==
Dwarven Halls is a supplement in which a campaign setting explores Valt Aszen, a rugged mountainous region inhabited by dwarves and humans. It provides an in-depth look at dwarven society, detailing a typical dwarven clan, the structure of their stronghold, and includes several short adventure scenarios.

== Publication history ==
Dwarven Halls was written by Arnold Hendrick with art by Liz Danforth and was published by Fantasy Games Unlimited in 1985 as a 48-page book.

== Reviews ==
- Papyrus (Issue 5 - 1991)
