= Prince of Thieves '81 =

Role-playing game scenarios

Prince of Thieves '81 is a 1981 role-playing game supplement published by Gamelords for Thieves' Guild.

== Contents ==
Prince of Thieves '81 is three adventure scenarios that were previously used in competition sponsored by Gamelords at several summer game conventions.

== Reception ==
Lewis Pulsipher reviewed Prince of Thieves '81 in The Space Gamer No. 47. Pulsipher commented that "If you liked the earlier Thieves' Guild material you'll like this, and at [the price] it may be one of the better values of the series. But if you want to try this kind of thing for the first time, get Thieves' Guild I so that you'll understand the rules."
