= Thieves' Guild 2 =

Tabletop role-playing game supplement

- Publishers: Gamelords
- Publication: 1980
- Genres: Role-playing
- Parent games: Thieves' Guild

Thieves' Guild 2 is a 1980 role-playing game supplement published by Gamelords for Thieves' Guild.

== Contents ==
Thieves' Guild 2 is the second supplement in a series of fantasy role-playing rules and adventure scenarios designed for thief characters.

== Reception ==
John T. Sapienza, Jr. reviewed Thieves' Guild, Thieves' Guild II, and Thieves' Guild III for Different Worlds magazine and stated that "their first three installments of the TG series prove they can maintain a high level of quality. Their scenarios are well planned and well conceived, and their game rules work."

Lewis Pulsipher reviewed Thieves' Guild II in The Space Gamer No. 43. Pulsipher commented that "At this price I suggest you look at a copy before you decide whether to buy it. It is a useful addition to TG, but certainly not indispensable."

Lewis Pulsipher reviewed Thieves' Guild II for White Dwarf #31, giving it an overall rating of 7 out of 10, and stated that "Gamelords's products are not for everyone, but a boon to the minority of FRPers at whom they are aimed."

== Reviews ==
- Dragon #54 (Oct 1981)
