= N. Robin Crossby =

Canadian role-playing game designer

N Robin Crossby
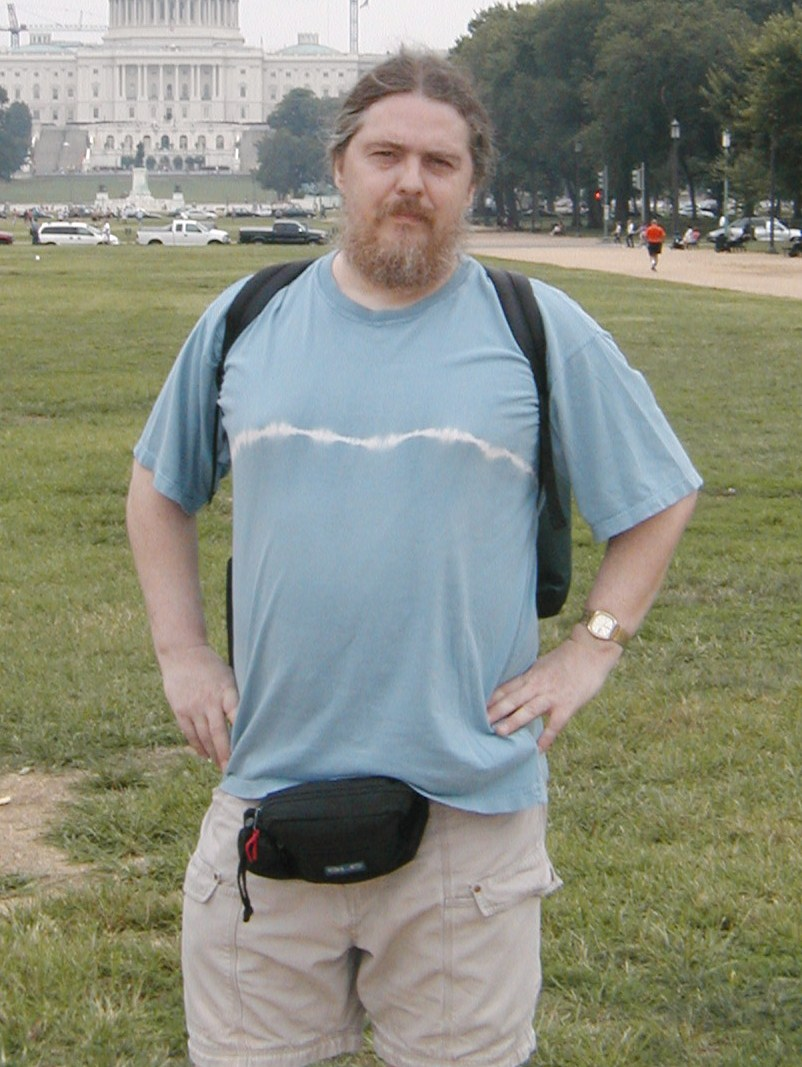
- Robin Crossby
- Born: 18 May 1954; London, England
- Died: 23 July 2008 (aged 54); Port Coquitlam, British Columbia, Canada
- Occupations: Writer, game designer
- Spouse: Sharon MacLeod
- Children: 3
- Writing career
- Period: 1980–2008

N. Robin Crossby (18 May 1954 – 23 July 2008) was the creator of the Hârn fantasy setting and the HârnMaster role-playing game system, as well as dozens of other related works describing the world of Hârn.

== Early life ==
N. Robin Crossby was born of Anglo-Welsh parents in 1954 in London, England, the third of four children. His early hobbies included slot car racing, a fascination with dinosaurs and the drawing of fictional maps. His early education took place at William Ellis School in London. The roots of Hârn can probably be traced back to his early role-playing experiments with his brother and sister in the early 1960s, which involved a hand-drawn map and a personal history of the lost continent of Atlantis.

Crossby's family emigrated to Canada in 1968, settling in the Vancouver, British Columbia suburb of Coquitlam. He attended Centennial High School. Between 1974 and 1980 Crossby was involved in dozens of projects, only some of which came to fruition. After graduating high school both he and his future wife Sharon went to work assembling circuit boards at Crossby Electronics. This company was owned by his father, Victor Crossby. They did a great deal of GlenAyre Electronics’ contract work during the 1970s and were responsible for the bulk of circuitry installed at the former BC Hydro tower located on Burnaby Mountain. Crossby was employed there until about 1980. He attended Douglas College from 1974 to 1976, graduating with an associate degree in Philosophy.

=== College years ===
During his tenure at Douglas College he began dabbling in graphic design, creating many logos and posters for various Douglas College clubs under the name Hexagon Graphics. Hexagon was still around decades later, its largest project being a logo design for Maple Ridge-based company Maple Meadows Glass in approximately 1995.

After graduating Douglas College he transferred to Simon Fraser University, where he co-founded SPLUD, the Society for the Protection of Large Unpleasant Dragons. SPLUD was a boardgame club that held meetings in the SFU Rotunda. Some of the games played there were designed earlier by Crossby with names like Power and Resource. After encountering Dungeons & Dragons, he started on early precursors of Hârn.

== Career ==
Crossby started detailing his original fantasy world of Kethira in 1977. Near the end of the 1970s, Robin started calling his gaming system Hârn and began shopping it with publishers. In 1980, Robin made first contact with the gaming company that would later become Columbia Games

Robin signed his first contract with the Vancouver-based gaming company in 1983. Throughout that year CGI published a series of booklets called the Encyclopedia Hârnica, consisting of the history and background of several regions of the island of Hârn. These were followed in the next three years by the Kingdom Modules, a re-release of much of the same material in a more condensed format. Also in the early 1980s, Columbia Games released the Hârn Regional Module, which included a massive, full-colour map that attracted many reluctant players to the system. The Hârn Regional Module was later rereleased as HârnWorld.

=== Harn ===
Like many popular role-playing environments of the time, Hârn took place in a quasi-medieval setting, on the world of Kèthîra in what could be described in another reality, but described in detail many factors that other systems often neglected. One section of HârnWorld, for instance, laid out a complex model for generating weather patterns that affected the entire planet. Hârn was unusual at its outset for having no defined system to support the story – many early players used Dungeons & Dragons rules systems or RuneQuest models to actually play Hârn campaigns. It wasn't until 1986 that Columbia Games released Hârn's companion rule system, HârnMaster I, which was a leap forward in RPG design in that it calculated the probabilities of various battle, exploration and magic scenarios in a far greater degree of detail than any existing system of the time. The level of detail involved in both modules and statistics made it intimidating for more faint-hearted players. Hârn meta-material was available in the form of CGI's HârnQuest Magazine, released four times annually, which is still published today. At one time Hârn fandom also had a thriving mailing list called HârnLine, also known as the Duffleboard for its moderator Rob Duff.

In 1996 CGI came out with HârnMaster Core (known colloquially as HârnMaster II), printed in full-colour on cardstock in a binder that theoretically allowed the system to expand with future modules. The modules included in the new HârnMaster Core series were also printed with the more popular D20 statistics, a different points system that simplified Hârn's extremely detailed points system and brought out resentment in veteran Hârn players who preferred the HârnMaster I rules. CGI argued that this would bring in a new generation of players, but Hârn fandom has boasted about the same number of players since approximately 1990. HârnMaster II also retailed for nearly US$50, which for the time was extremely expensive.

Columbia Games moved to Washington state, and Crossby stopped writing new material for the company in 1994; fans began more and more to add expansions they created (called "fanon") as no more official material was being produced for the setting, and Crossby also began working on his own version of Hârn.

=== International Publishing and Conflict with Columbia Games ===
In 1998, Robin and CGI were contacted by Auran Games, an Australian video game company interested in developing a Hârnic Internet role-playing game. Robin signed his second contract with CGI that same year. Over the next three years Auran paid for four trips to Australia including one where he was accompanied by his wife, as well as a business associate Tom Dalgliesh and his wife Penny. But tensions had been rising between Robin and Columbia Games, which had moved to Washington state for tax purposes in 1999. Robin had grown unhappy with the direction being taken with the Hârn product line and had begun self-publishing his own modules under the name Kelestia Productions in 1997. These modules and rulebooks diverged from CGI's releases as of the HârnMaster I series. Robin released both digital products in PDF format through Hyperbooks.com and print products which were produced in Burnaby and shipped in large volume from his home with the help of his eldest daughter Arien. During this period he published nearly half a dozen products, including his own extension of the basic rules called HârnMaster Gold. HMG was not only a new version of the Hârn universe, but a guide to campaigning with the Hârn world in any gaming system without compromising on the level of detail.

CGI and Robin worked together alongside Auran until 2000 when the Auran project was cancelled by Electronics Arts, the games proposed publisher, before it was fully completed. It was one of a number of games cancelled by Electronic Arts at the time due to budget cutbacks. Over the next three years there arose more conflicts between Robin and CGI over licensing and unpaid royalties, which led to Robin formally dissolving his contract with Columbia Games in 2003. Columbia games continued to produce Hârn products in defiance of the contract dissolution up until Crossby's death and beyond.

The present-day Kelestia Productions website was founded in approximately 2006 and began selling digital copies of modules under the name Hârn Canon, to differentiate it from the products still being sold by Columbia Games. These modules were created not only by Robin but by his fans; by this period Robin was actively encouraging the input of his fanbase to create new material. The Chélemby City (publication title: Chélemby: City of the Sea Kings) module was produced as a group effort between Robin and many contributors and fans, including his long-time friend Rob Duff. Kelestia Productions was incorporated in October 2008, and since his death in July 2008, the company has published modules and products under the guidance of his heirs and estate-appointed project heads Jeremy Baker (a New Zealander) and Ken Snellings (an American).

Though the dispute between Kelestia Productions and Columbia Games has never been completely resolved, Kelestia Productions has sold electronic-format modules since c. 2006. After Robin's death in 2008 his intellectual property rights passed on to his eldest daughter Arien. The trademark for the name “Hârn” was formally granted to Arien Crossby by the Canadian Intellectual Property Office in September 2009, and Kelestia Productions is not currently pursuing the American trademark, but continues to produce module content and other products independently.

== Personal life ==
Not long after arriving in Canada he met his future spouse, Sharon MacLeod, a close friend of his sister. They were married in 1987, and have three children.

Crossby was similarly attracted to the arts; he was an accomplished guitar player and composer who often performed at family gatherings. He was also an amateur playwright, and between Douglas College and SFU Robin, his future wife Sharon, his sister Sue and their friends operated a small community theatre company called Threshold Theatre out of the James Cowan Theatre in Burnaby.

In early 2006, Robin was diagnosed with liposarcoma of the bowel, a cancer arising in fat cells. Throughout his illness he continued his work, and the last map completed by Crossby was a map of the entire Harnic world. Many also applauded Crossby for keeping a sharp and witty blog on the Kelestia website during the course of his illness. Despite surgery and chemotherapy, he died two years later on 23 July 2008, in a hospice in Port Coquitlam, British Columbia.
