= Thieves' Guild 7 =

Thieves' Guild 7 is a 1982 role-playing game supplement published by Gamelords for Thieves' Guild.

== Contents ==
Thieves' Guild 7 is a supplement in which detailed rules are included for inborn talents, covering skills in crafts, animals, weapons, magic, damage resistance, and psi powers. The book also expands on lock-picking and trap mechanics. It features two scenarios: "The Smithy of Vultar", a burglary of a dwarf smith's forge to retrieve an enchanted sword, and "The Claw of Frithnath", where players must identify and steal a powerful magic item from a caravan while navigating rival factions. The supplement introduces a structured timetable for gamemasters to create encounters.

Thieves' Guild 7 features two adventure scenarios: "The Smithy of Vultar", in which cat-burglars infiltrate a dwarf's magic weapons forge, and "The Claw of Frithnath", where armed robbers must identify which caravan member possesses a valuable magic item. The supplement also introduces detailed rules for lock-picking.

== Publication history ==
Thieves' Guild 7 was written by Kerry Lloyd, Richard Meyer, Janet Trautvetter, Hal McKinney, Keith Holzapfel and Walter H. Hunt, and was published by Gamelords in 1982 as a 48-page book.

== Reception ==
John T. Sapienza, Jr. reviewed Thieves' Guild 7, Thieves' Guild 8, Thieves' Guild 9, and Thieves' Guild 10 for Different Worlds magazine and stated that "These four volumes illustrate the quality of Gamelords' products. They concentrate on personality and variety to supply the gamemaster with role-playing tools to enrich a campaign, whether or not that campaign uses the Gamelords' world of Haven and whether or not that campaign emphasizes thieving for most of its activity. Most of the scenario ideas do not depend on the existence of a thieves guild - and indeed any party of adventurers could undertake many of the offered outdoor scenarios, although the burglary scenarios do require specialized thieving skills to succeed. The Thieves' Guild series is worth using as an aid in any fantasy campaign."
