= Within the Tyrant's Demesne =

Role-playing games supplement

Within the Tyrant's Demesne is a 1983 role-playing game supplement for Thieves' Guild published by Gamelords. Its principal author was future science fiction writer Walter H. Hunt, along with Richard Meyer and Robert Traynor.

== Contents ==
Within the Tyrant's Demesne is an adventure in a society under the reign of an evil count. It was originally intended for the Land Beyond the Mountains line using The Fantasy Trip system under license from Metagaming, but was retooled for independent release when Metagaming folded in 1983.

== Publication history ==
Within the Tyrant's Demesne was written by Walter Hunt and Richard Meyer, with Kerry Lloyd and Robert Traynor, and was published by Gamelords in 1983 as a 48-page book.

== Reception ==
Chris Hunter reviewed Within the Tyrant's Demesne for Imagine magazine, and stated that " The complexity of who is helping/ fighting whom and why, means that if the module is to be used in anything like the intended detail a large wall chart of what's going on is essential. My only criticism is that the whole thing could have been laid out a little more clearly."

Rick Swan reviewed Within the Tyrant's Demesne in Space Gamer No. 73. Swan commented that "The setting is heavily political and may be too dry for some, but clever touches abound - I especially liked the 'Weepons' shop operated by an enterprising insect (who's all business)."
