= Wraith Overlord: Terror Beneath the City State =

Role-playing game supplement

Wraith Overlord: Terror Beneath the City State is a 1981 fantasy role-playing game supplement published by Judges Guild for any role-playing game.

== Contents ==
Wraith Overlord: Terror Beneath the City State is a fantasy role-playing game supplement which details the underground areas associated with the City State of the Invincible Overlord.

== Reception ==
Lewis Pulsipher reviewed Wraith Overlord: Terror Beneath the City State in The Space Gamer No. 51. Pulsipher commented that "If you use City State you'll probably want this package. Otherwise you can probably find something more suitable to spend [money] for, though this is, by Judges Guild standards, good material."
