= Fantasy Squares Grid Sheets and Mapers Aid Template =

Fantasy Squares Grid Sheets and Mapers Aid Template is a 1981 role-playing game supplement published by Harry's House.

== Contents ==
Fantasy Squares Grid Sheets and Mapers Aid Template contains the Mapper's Aid template, which is a hard plastic 5" x 3 3/4" sheet with holes cut into it to assist in drawing symbols using a fine point pen or pencil.

== Reception ==
Lewis Pulsipher reviewed Fantasy Squares Grid Sheets and Mapers Aid Template in The Space Gamer No. 48. Pulsipher commented that "Unless you intend to show off your maps as works of art, I don't see the need for this precision. Almost anyone can draw a perfectly adequate circle, star, whatever quicker than he can use a template to help him draw one. The direction cross is particularly useless except for show. For maps-as-'art' the template would be quite valuable."
