= Thieves' Guild VI =

Thieves' Guild VI is a 1982 role-playing game supplement published by Gamelords for Thieves' Guild.

== Contents ==
Thieves' Guild VI is a supplement in which maritime adventures are introduced to the game system, prioritizing role-playing over technical accuracy in ship handling. A brief magic system introduction is tucked within the ship combat rules, offering an incremental spell system that requires additional development by the gamemaster. The main scenario takes place in the Biracean Sea, featuring a detailed map and descriptions of seafaring nations. Ships serve as self-contained piracy scenarios, with information on cargo, crews, and potential interactions. Major personalities are only briefly sketched, leaving gamemasters to flesh them out.

Thieves' Guild VI contains rules for trading at sea, combat between ships, and piracy, and presents a brief overview of a campaign setting as well as details for 30 ships and their crews.

== Publication history ==
Thieves' Guild VI was written by Kerry Lloyd and Richard Meyer with Larry Richardson and published by Gamelords in 1982 as a 64-page book.

== Reception ==
John T. Sapienza Jr. reviewed Thieves' Guild IV, Thieves' Guild V, and Thieves' Guild VI for Different Worlds magazine and stated that "even if you are not particularly interested in thieves for role-playing, the Thieves' Guild line is worth looking at for ideas."

== Reviews ==
- Papyrus (Issue 7 – 1992)
