= Dwarfstar Games =

Dwarfstar Games was a division of Heritage Models that published microgame-sized fantasy and science fiction board wargames in the early 1980s. They typically came with 12"x14" fold-out cardstock mapboards and 154 thin die-cut counters. The demise of its parent company also meant the end for Dwarfstar.

Game	Designer	Date
Barbarian Prince	Arnold Hendrick	1981
Demonlord	Arnold Hendrick	1981
Outpost Gamma	Howard Barasch	1981
Star Viking	Arnold Hendrick	1981
Dragon Rage	Lewis Pulsipher	1982
Goblin	Howard Barasch	1982
Grav Armor	Arnold Hendrick	1982
Star Smuggler	B. Dennis Sustare	1982

Dragon Rage was reissued in a much larger format, with an additional board and scenarios, by Flatlined Games (Belgium) in 2011.

== Reception ==
Steve List reviewed the first four games from Dwarfstar Games in Ares Magazine #12 and commented that "one is outstanding, one quite good and the others somewhat underwhelming. But [for the price] they are not too much of an investment."

In a retrospective in Black Gate, John ONeill said "As a business, the Dwarfstar line wasn't a success. Unlike Metagaming and Task Force, who released dozens of titles over the years, they produced only eight games between 1981-82. But from a creative perspective, they were a magnificent hit."
