= Thieves' Guild (role-playing game) =

Tabletop fantasy role-playing game

Thieves' Guild is a fantasy role-playing game published by Gamelords in 1980.

== Description ==
Thieves' Guild is a fantasy system that originated as supplementary rules for thief-type characters and grew into a fairly complex system of its own. Emphasis is on outlaw characters with stealth and dexterity skills. There are 60 noncombat skills, each with four levels of mastery; there are no magic skills for characters. The "Basic Character Creation" book (32 pages) describes characters and character creation, abilities, skills, training, and equipment. The "Thieves' Guild" book (two parts, 40 and 32 pages) covers thieving skills, combat, experience, thieves' guilds, medieval justice, and a number of sample miniscenarios that introduce the GM to running adventures for bandit and thief characters.

== Publication history ==
Thieves' Guild was designed by Richard Meyer, Kerry Lloyd, and Michael Watkins, and was published in 1980 by Gamelords as a package of 128 loose-leaf hole-punched pages. The second edition featured a cover by David Martin and was published by Gamelords in 1984 as a boxed set including a 40-page book, and two 32-page books, and a sample character sheet.

== Publications ==
- Thieves' Guild 2 (1980)
- Thieves' Guild 3: The Duke's Dress Ball (1980)
- The Free City of Haven (1981)
- Prince of Thieves '81 (1981)
- Thieves' Guild 4 (1981)
- Thieves' Guild 5 (1981)
- Thieves' Guild 6 (1982)
- Thieves' Guild 7 (1982)
- City of the Sacred Flame (1983)
- The Demon Pits of Caeldo (1983)
- Haven: Secrets of the Labyrinth (1983)
- Lair of the Freebooters (1983)
- The Mines of Keridav (1983)
- Thieves' Guild 8 (1983)
- Thieves' Guild 9: Escape From the Ashwood Mines (1983)
- Within the Tyrant's Demesne (1983)
- Thieves' Guild 10: Bandit Gangs and Caravans (1984)

== Reception ==
John T. Sapienza, Jr. reviewed Thieves' Guild, Thieves' Guild II, and Thieves' Guild III for Different Worlds magazine and stated that "their first three installments of the TG series prove they can maintain a high level of quality. Their scenarios are well planned and well conceived, and their game rules work."

Lewis Pulsipher reviewed Thieves' Guild in The Space Gamer No. 43. Pulsipher commented that "As a separate game TG is reasonably interesting, but few veteran gamers will want to change from their own rules, and few novices would understand it. As a set of scenarios and rule suggestions, TG is better than much Judges Guild material, and even at [the price] it offers as much for your dollar as the 'official' modules published by the major companies, provided you are interested in thieves and you don't mind poor printing. In fact, if you like thieves, or want to give them more scope in your game, buy TG before you buy any other supplement."

Lewis Pulsipher reviewed Thieves' Guild for White Dwarf #31, giving it an overall rating of 9 out of 10, and stated that "Gamelords's products are not for everyone, but a boon to the minority of FRPers at whom they are aimed."

In Issue 14 of Abyss, Dave Nalle noted "The art is awful, but the material itself is quite good ... though the rule system which they develop in the series is an uninspired D&D variant." Nalle concluded, "On the whole, the series is not bad."

Rick Swan reviewed the 1984 revised version of Thieves' Guild in Space Gamer No. 73. Swan commented that "If more effort had gone into developing Thieves' Guild as a supplement instead of a complete system, it'd be worth the asking price. As it stands, thieves on a budget are advised to save their money."

K.L. Campbell reviewed Thieves' Guild for Different Worlds magazine and stated that "On the whole, this is an above-average system, even with its drawbacks. It offers many opportunities for thieves to actually role-play, which is a fine and splendid thing. Seriously, this game is a must for anyone who allows a thief or thief-like class in any game system. Thieves used to be a bore to play at times, but no more. The possibilities are practically endless. . ."

In his 1990 book The Complete Guide to Role-Playing Games, game critic Rick Swan was disappointed, commenting, "though the premise is interesting, the execution is so convoluted that it's bound to discourage all but the most dedicated players." Despite this, Swan liked the combat system's "solid rules covering back-stabbing, strangulation, and other useful attack options for lawless character. Swan also liked the segment covering the medieval justice system. But Swan concluded by giving the game a poor rating of only 2 out of 4, saying, "the lack of magic, monsters, and other elements common to fantasy settings severely limits the game's appeal."

== Other reviews ==
- Dragon #54
