= HârnWorld =

Tabletop role-playing game supplement

Cover art by Eric Hotz, 1990

HârnWorld, subtitled "A Real Fantasy World", is a fantasy role-playing game setting published by Columbia Games in 1990, an expanded revision of the Hârn Regional Module published in 1983. Although Columbia also published the HârnMaster role-playing rules system, this product contains information only, no rules or statistics, and can be adapted to any role-playing system.

== Contents ==
Harnworld is a role-playing game campaign set on the fictional planet Kethira, and focussed mainly on Hârn, an island about three times the size of Great Britain, as well as Lythia, the world's largest continent. Broadly based on Norman England, it is a low-fantasy setting with minimal magic and no mythical "monsters"; some sense of fantasy is provided by the inclusion of dwarves, elves and orcs.

The set includes:

- "Hârnworld", an 80-page book containing a general overview of the region of Hârn, the continent of Lythia and the planet Kethira, including historical background, religion, economics and culture.
- "Hârndex": a 72-page encyclopedia containing indexed information about the island.
- a 22" x 34" colour map of the island
- a plastic binder to hold the contents

Like the original Hârn Regional Module, this edition does not include a role-playing game rules system. Although the setting could be used with the HârnMaster rules system published by Columbia, gamemasters could also adapt the Hârn campaign setting to another rules system of the time such as Advanced Dungeons & Dragons or RuneQuest.

== Publication history ==
The Hârn Regional Module published by Columbia Games in 1983 was the first product about Hârn. In 1990, Columbia Games published a revised and expanded second edition titled HârnWorld that also includes information from the Lythia Continent Module.

HârnWorld was written by N. Robin Crossby, Tom Dalgliesh, and Edwin King, with additional contributions by Brad Carter, Brian Clemens, Rob Duff, Mike Dwyer, John Frazer, Doug Gillanders, John Greer, Stephen Hinchcliffe, David Kowan, Sharon MacLeod, Simon Matthews, Brad Murray, Gene Siegel, and Garry Steinhilber. Cartography was by Crossby, Ron Gibson, Richard Porter, and Eric Hotz; Hotz also created the interior art and the cover.

== Reception ==
Lisa Stevens reviewed HârnWorld in White Wolf #22 (Aug./Sept., 1990), rating it a 4 out of 5 and stated that "Overall, Hârn is the best campaign world I have come across in my years of gaming and my recommendation is unreserved. With the exception of the missing character generation section, the 2nd edition is a marked improvement. In the past, Columbia Game's products have been rather pricey, scaring off potential customers, but you get what you pay for and HârnWorld is excellent."

In the May 1996 edition of Dragon (Issue 229), Rick Swan called the full-colour map "gorgeous" and the artwork "evocative." He noted that "Harn World emphasizes culture and economics at the expense of magic and monsters, making it less appealing to hack'n'slashers than to veterans who take their games seriously." Swan also admitted the amount of information here was overwhelming, but concluded, "Unwieldy? Perhaps. To call Harn World ambitious is like calling the Grand Canyon a large hole. But if you've outgrown dungeon crawls, you might be ready to jump in."
