= Thieves' Guild 5 =

Role-playing game supplement

Thieves' Guild 5 is a 1981 role-playing game supplement published by Gamelords for Thieves' Guild.

== Contents ==
Thieves' Guild 5 is a supplement in which new mechanics for shield and armor calculations are presented to streamline gameplay. It includes a whimsical "Temple Looting Scenarios and Tomb Robbing Adventures" module, featuring an illusionist's tomb filled with deceptive but non-lethal illusions — except for a final deadly trap. The second module, "Assassination Scenarios and Espionage Adventures", tasks players with infiltrating an orc stronghold to assassinate their leader and destabilize the faction. Given the difficulty of disguising as orcs, players must navigate language barriers, cultural differences, and castle defenses while engaging with detailed orcish personalities. The module also sets up long-term political consequences for the Thieves' Guild setting.

Thieves' Guild 5 includes two scenarios: "The Illusionist's Tomb", which focuses on tomb-robbers, and "The Radisha Must Die", which involves the player characters being hired to assassinate an orcish religious leader. It also contains new rules for using armor and shields.

== Publication history ==
Thieves' Guild 5 was written by Janet Trautvetter and Kerry Lloyd and published by Gamelords in 1981 as a 48-page book. A 2nd edition was published in 1982 with a color cover.

== Reception ==
John T. Sapienza Jr. reviewed Thieves' Guild IV, Thieves' Guild V, and Thieves' Guild VI for Different Worlds magazine and stated that "even if you are not particularly interested in thieves for role-playing, the Thieves' Guild line is worth looking at for ideas."
