= Lair of the Freebooters =

Tabletop role-playing game adventure

- Designers: Janet Trautvetter; Kerry Lloyd; Kevin Hardwick
- Publishers: Gamelords
- Publication: 1983
- Genres: Fantasy

Lair of the Freebooters is a adventure published by Gamelords in 1983 for the fantasy role-playing game Thieves' Guild.

== Contents ==
Lair of the Freebooters is a supplement which depicts an adventure setting which is always under threat from piracy. The book includes a number of scenarios and encounters that can be used by a gamemaster in a campaign.

== Publication history ==
In 1980, Gamelords published the role-playing system Thieves' Guild, a role-playing system and campaign world that was mainly for player characters who were thieves and rogues. Gamelords published over a dozen supplements and adventures for this system, including 1983's Lair of the Freebooters, a 48-page book written by Janet Trautvetter, Kerry Lloyd, and Kevin Hardwick.

== Reception ==
In Issue 30 of Abyss (Summer 1984), Jon Schuller called this "a rather well put-together aid, giving the background of a region inhabited by pirates." Schuller warned that the information was set up in a completely different manner than more well-known adventures published by TSR, writing "it really is a better way of design, allowing for a lot of latitude and flexible options for the gamemaster, however, it requires initiative and imagination on [the GM's] part to make the background come alive." Schuller concluded, "While the topic is not that new or exciting, the presentation and development are nice, and I can easily recommend it to players who have outgrown TSR's standard fare but are still playing D&D or a variant."

In Issue 23 of the British RPG magazine Imagine, Chris Hunter commented "I have no great desire to bring pirates into my AD&D games but if you do, LotF plus [Thieves Guild 6] for ship to ship combat rules etc are a good place to start."

In Issue 73 of Space Gamer, Rick Swan noted, "Although it's well-presented, roleplayers who've been around awhile have probably run across much of this elsewhere and will find more of the same here. Those with an insatiable taste for the high seas, however, will want to check out the sections on ship weaponry, naval tactics, and crew skills."
