= Thieves' Guild 8 =

Tabletop role-playing game supplement

Thieves' Guild 8 is a supplement published by Gamelords in 1983 for the fantasy role-playing game Thieves' Guild. It is the eighth of ten books in the series.

== Contents ==
In the Thieves' Guild fantasy role-playing game, players take on the roles of thieves in an underworld of crime. In a series of supplements, Gamelords presented several adventures and extra rules. Thieves Guild 8 contains additional rules for ranged weapons, further explanations, and adventure hooks for

- highwaymen
- cat burglars
- various types of armed robberies
- temple looters and tomb robbers
- pickpockets and cutpurses
- assassins
- pirates

Two adventures are included:

- The adventurers must rescue a kidnapped bride
- In Part 1 of "Secret of the Crystal Mountains," the players enter the haunted Eregin Forest, seeking a treasure of glowing crystals. (Continued in Thieves' Guild 9: Escape From the Ashwood Mines).

== Publication history ==
Gamelords first published Thieves' Guild in 1980. Over the next four years, they released nine more supplements, including Thieves' Guild 8 in 1983, a 32-page softcover book written by Kerry Lloyd, Alfred Hipkins, and Janet Trautvetter, with artwork by Becky Harding, Denis Loubet, Wallace Miller, Larry Shade, Hannah M. G. Shapero, John Statema, and Janet Trautvetter.

== Reception ==
Chris Hunter reviewed Thieves' Guild 8 and Thieves' Guild 9: Escape From the Ashwood Mines for Imagine magazine and stated, "The scenarios are all very good though some need a little extra work to flesh them out."

John T. Sapienza Jr. reviewed Thieves' Guild 7, Thieves' Guild 8, Thieves' Guild 9, and Thieves' Guild 10 for Different Worlds magazine and stated that "These four volumes illustrate the quality of Gamelords' products. They concentrate on personality and variety to supply the gamemaster with role-playing tools to enrich a campaign, whether or not that campaign uses the Gamelords' world of Haven and whether or not that campaign emphasizes thieving for most of its activity. Most of the scenario ideas do not depend on the existence of a thieves guild - and indeed any party of adventurers could undertake many of the offered outdoor scenarios, although the burglary scenarios do require specialized thieving skills to succeed. The Thieves' Guild series is worth using as an aid in any fantasy campaign."
