= Thieves' Guild 10: Bandit Gangs and Caravans =

Thieves' Guild 10: Bandit Gangs and Caravans is a 1984 role-playing game supplement published by Gamelords for Thieves' Guild.

== Contents ==
Thieves' Guild 10: Bandit Gangs and Caravans is a supplement in which the focus is on caravan robbery, providing rules for assembling and running both caravans and bandit gangs, along with mass combat mechanics. The supplement includes a burglary scenario where players must steal a valuable ruby from a merchant who refused to pay protection money. Success requires infiltration, deception, and strategic use of rumors about key figures in the merchant's household.

Thieves' Guild 10 provides rules for caravan creation and cargo management, introduces mass combat mechanics, and includes a scenario for cat-burglar characters titled "The Lesson".

== Publication history ==
Thieves' Guild 10: Bandit Gangs and Caravans was written by Kerry Lloyd, Richard Meyer, John Fonda, and Jane Trautvetter, with a cover by Mark Rogers, and published by Gamelords in 1984 as a 36-page book.

Shannon Appelcline explained how "From the start, Thieves' Guild was planned as a periodical, available by subscription [...] each new supplement continued to expand the original ruleset. In the end there would be 10, running up to Thieves' Guild 10: Bandit Ganes and Caravans (1984)."

== Reception ==
John T. Sapienza, Jr. reviewed Thieves' Guild 7, Thieves' Guild 8, Thieves' Guild 9, and Thieves' Guild 10 for Different Worlds magazine and stated that "These four volumes illustrate the quality of Gamelords' products. They concentrate on personality and variety to supply the gamemaster with role-playing tools to enrich a campaign, whether or not that campaign uses the Gamelords' world of Haven and whether or not that campaign emphasizes thieving for most of its activity. Most of the scenario ideas do not depend on the existence of a thieves guild - and indeed any party of adventurers could undertake many of the offered outdoor scenarios, although the burglary scenarios do require specialized thieving skills to succeed. The Thieves' Guild series is worth using as an aid in any fantasy campaign."

== Reviews ==
- Dragon #97
