= Thieves' Guild 3: The Duke's Dress Ball =

Tabletop role-playing game supplement

- Publishers: Gamelords
- Publication: 1980
- Genres: Role-playing
- Parent games: Thieves' Guild

Thieves' Guild 3: The Duke's Dress Ball is a 1980 role-playing game supplement published by Gamelords for Thieves' Guild.

== Contents ==
Thieves' Guild 3: The Duke's Dress Ball is a supplement which includes expansions to the rules for lockpicking and pickpocketing, and presents a pair of adventure scenarios, "The Tower of Tsitsiconus" and "The Duke's Dress Ball".

== Reception ==
John T. Sapienza, Jr. reviewed Thieves' Guild, Thieves' Guild II, and Thieves' Guild III for Different Worlds magazine and stated that "their first three installments of the TG series prove they can maintain a high level of quality. Their scenarios are well planned and well conceived, and their game rules work."

Mike Kardos reviewed Thieves' Guild III in The Space Gamer No. 44. Kardos commented that "I recommend Thieves' Guild III to all who enjoy playing Thieves' Guild. Gamelords Ltd. has created another excellent product. It is making itself a great reputation for quality."

Lewis Pulsipher reviewed Thieves' Guild III for White Dwarf #31, giving it an overall rating of 7 out of 10, and stated that "Gamelords's products are not for everyone, but a boon to the minority of FRPers at whom they are aimed."

== Reviews ==
- Dragon #54 (Oct 1981)
