= Arnold Hendrick =

Game designer

Arnold J. Hendrick (1951 – 25 May 2020) was an American designer and developer of role-playing games (RPGs), board games and video games. He is best-known for the single-player video RPG Darklands.

== Early life ==
Hendrick started to play with toy armies while in primary school, designing combat rules for them. In high school, he played board wargames published by Avalon Hill, then switched to tabletop RPGs such as Dungeons and Dragons and Traveller in the mid-1970s. He credited his interest in gaming in leading to a bachelor's degree in history.

== Tabletop games ==
Hendrick began his creative career by developing board games. His first game was a historical board wargame created by Ed Smith for Avalon Hill, released as Trireme in 1971.

Hendrick became the publishing director at Heritage Games in 1979, to coordinate non-miniatures production and design designing RPGs and board games. He designed the game Knights and Magick (1980) for Heritage. Hendrick also designed the 1980 fantasy games Caverns of Doom, and Crypt of the Sorcerer. He created several games for the Dwarfstar Games division such as Barbarian Prince (1981), Demonlord (1981), Star Viking (1982), and Grav Armor (1982). He designed Swordbearer (1982) with Dennis Sustare, a full role-playing game published by Heritage. Hendrick and David Helber designed The Tavern (1983), a set of dungeon floor plans intended to be published by Heritage, but wound up being the sole product published by the Genesis Gaming Products division of World Wide Wargames after Heritage went out of business.

== Video games ==
Just as console video games hit the market in 1983, Jennell Jaquays hired Hendrick to work at Coleco Industries. Hendrick worked at Coleco as Senior Game Designer, and when Coleco imploded during the video game crash of 1983, Hendrick moved to Microprose in 1986 to work as a game designer. His credits at Microprose include Gunship, F-19 Stealth Fighter, and Silent Service II. He worked with Sid Meier on the Commodore 64 versions of Sid Meier's Pirates! doing documentation and scenario design, and also on Red Storm Rising. Hendrick collaborated with Meier on 15 different games. Hendrick collaborated with Lawrence Schick on Sword of the Samurai. Henrdick was the chief designer of the 1989 tank simulation M1 Tank Platoon. Hendrick was responsible for the cartridge games section at MicroProse, and in the early 1990s he was involved in moving away from 16-bit game systems towards 32-bit and 64-bit game systems.

It was at Microprose that he designed his best-known game, Darklands. The MS-DOS video game took three years and $3 million to develop — a large amount of money at the time — and the result was a unique and ground-breaking program that was plagued by glitches and bugs. As Andy Chalk noted in PC Gamer, "It wasn't a hit, largely because it was wracked with bugs at release, but featured remarkably deep systems and attention to detail, and genuinely unique, 'realistic' game world: a mythologized version of the 15th-century Holy Roman Empire, in which the creatures and dangers that people of the era believed were real actually are." Critics who could look past the game's glitches called Darklands "one of the best multicharacter FRPGs we've had the delight to play" and "surpass[es] the complexity and historical accuracy seen in any other contemporary computer game." Darklands was a finalist for PC Games' Best Role-playing Game of 1992 (losing to Wizardry VII), and won the 1992 "PC Special Achievement Award" from Game Players magazine. Decades later, Darklands continued to be an inspiration for game development. Todd Howard cited the game as an influence on Bethesda Softworks' popular fantasy role-playing series The Elder Scrolls. Darklands was a direct inspiration for Obsidian Entertainment's 2022 role-playing game Pentiment. In 1995 Al Giovetti of The Computer Show interviewed Hendrick and two other Microprose employees about the creation and play of Darklands just two years after its release. Giovetti names Hendrick the designer and Hendrick describes detailed aspects of the game.

In 1995, Hendrick moved to Interactive Magic, where he was involved in growing and leading the design staff. He also helped to develop American Civil War: From Sumter to Appomattox. In 2000, he went to Electronic Arts/Kesmai Studios to develop Air Warrior. He later worked for Forterra Systems. Hendrick moved to the Seattle area to work for The Amazing Society, where he was a Principal Designer on the first Marvel MMORPG MMORG Super Hero Squad Online (2011). In 2013, he was a key hire for Area 52 Games Star Wars MMOG based on his experience He became a freelance consultant in 2016.

== Awards ==
At the 1982 Origins Awards, Barbarian Prince, the board game created by Hendricks, won the Charles S. Roberts Award in the category "Best Fantasy Board Game of 1981".

In 2006, almost twenty years after its release, GameSpot included Darklands on their list of "The Greatest Games of All Time".
