= Spacefarers Guide to Planets: Sector Two - Rourkes Diadem =

Role-playing game supplement

Spacefarers Guide to Planets: Sector Two - Rourkes Diadem is a 1979 role-playing game supplement published by Phoenix Games.

== Contents ==
Spacefarers Guide to Planets: Sector Two - Rourkes Diadem is a supplement presenting pre-generated, fully described planets intended for use in science fiction role-playing game campaigns.

== Reception ==
William A. Barton reviewed Spacefarers Guide to Planets: Sector Two - Rourkes Diadem in The Space Gamer No. 33. Barton commented that "I see no reason not to add Spacefarers Guide to Planets: Sector Two - Rourkes Diadem to your SF role-playing collection, along with its companion volume – unless your problem is agoraphobia, and the universe's big enough for you as is."
