= Valley of the Four Winds =

Fantasy board game

Valley of the Four Winds is a fantasy board game published by Games Workshop in 1980 that is based on a serialized story that appeared in White Dwarf.

== Description ==
Valley of the Four Winds is a two-player board game where one player attempts to occupy the city of Farrondil and the other player tries to save it. The evil player has an invading army of skeletons and various monsters controlled by a giant bell. To destroy the giant bell and end the invasion, the good player must attempt to fend off the skeletons while sending a hero in search of a relic. The hero must then take the relic to a good wizard to activate it, while avoiding monsters such as a wind demon and an evil wizard. All of this must be accomplished before the skeleton army reaches the city. The evil player wins by successfully occupying the city, the good player by destroying the bell.

=== Components ===
The box contains

- mounted hex grid map in two sections
- 100 die-cut counters
- rule booklet
- story booklet containing reprint of the Rowland Flynn novella "Valley of the Four Winds"

== Publication history ==
In 1978, the British miniature figurine company Minifigs produced an extensive line of 25 mm fantasy figures designed by Dick Higgs under the name "Valley of the Four Winds." Simultaneously, White Dwarf published a serialized novella titled "Valley of the Four Winds" by Rowland Flynn in Issues 8–12. In 1980, Games Workshop published Valley of the Four Winds, a board game designed by Lewis Pulsipher that was based on the Flynn novella and the miniatures.

== Reception ==
In Issue 37 of The Space Gamer (March 1981), David Ladyman noted that "Valley of the Four Winds suffers from being a British import" due to its higher price in the U.S., but concluded "If you enjoyed the short story, by all means buy the game."

In the April–May 1981 issue of White Dwarf (#24), Alan Paull was impressed by the game, saying, "Lewis Pulsipher has designed a game which is simple enough for the novice to tackle, and yet sufficiently demanding to offer a challenge to the experienced fantasy gamer. Information needed by the players is quickly and easily available. It is an ambitious project, successfully executed, and makes a very enjoyable fantasy game." He concluded by giving the game an above-average rating of 9 out of 10.

In Issue 33 of Phoenix (September–October 1981), Roger Musson was impressed by the quality of the components, especially since this was one of the first four games produced by Games Workshop. He called the rules booklet "the most astonishing part of the game. It is, believe it or not, clear throughout. It seems to have been proofread properly." In fact, Musson said the game show signs of being "fully developed and play-tested before being released." He found the game "entertaining". He concluded, "The great variety of courses that the game can take is what gives it interest. On this account alone it deserves some success."

== Reviews ==
- Games #42
- 1984 Games 100
- Jeux & Stratégie #11 (as "La vallée des quatre vents")
