= The Free City of Haven =

Role-playing game supplement

Cover of the first edition

The Free City of Haven is a campaign setting published by Gamelords in 1981 that can be used with any role-playing game rules, including Gamelords's own fantasy role-playing game Thieves' Guild.

== Contents ==
The Free City of Haven is a campaign setting that details the fictional city of Haven with a population of 80,000. The book includes seven chapters that cover each of the seven boroughs of the city, as well as providing sixty random street encounters, in-depth descriptions of 300 notable people, an overview of the city and detailed information on businesses and twenty-five scenarios. Eleven maps of various neighborhoods are also included.

== Publication history ==
The Free City of Haven was published by Gamelords in 1981 as a 128-page loose-leaf book, the first of three volumes that were scheduled to be published about Haven. The second volume, Haven: Secrets of the Labyrinth, was released in 1983, but the third volume was not published before Gamelords went out of business in 1985.

The Free City of Haven was re-issued as a boxed set re-titled Haven: The Free City in 1984.

== Reception ==
In the November 1981 edition of The Space Gamer (No. 45), Lewis Pulsipher commented that "I can't decide for you whether this is what you need. But it's a damn good job."

John T. Sapienza, Jr reviewed The Free City of Haven for Different Worlds magazine and stated that "The Free City of Haven is a city in the ancient meaning of the word rather than the modern english meaning - a populace who live together, rather than the buildings and roads that make up their place of home and work. As a book of maps, it is a useful game aid. As a scenario pack, it is of far higher quality than you might guess from a casual inspection, unless you are already familiar with the fine Theives' Guild series. If you are looking for a game aid in creating a city for your fantasy role-playing campaign you certainly should look at this one."

In the June 1982 edition of Dragon (#62), Arlen Walker was excited by the breadth of information provided, saying, "Moreso than any city I’ve ever played in, Haven is alive. Its inhabitants are not mere NPC’s, but real people, with lives, plans, and secrets of their own. Its business establishments are completely detailed, from hours of operation to regular customers, from the personality of the owner to where he keeps his cashbox." However, Walker did have a problem with where all of this information was found. "The statistics are all bunched in an appendix, with no clues therein as to where the detailed descriptions for each character are located in the main text." Walker also had a problem with the maps, or rather the lack of them, pointing out that the box promises "a complete package"; but upon opening the box, he discovered that the eleven included maps only covered about a third of the city, and that buyers would have to wait for two more future products from Gamelords to get the other maps. "If Gamelords intended to produce two more volumes of Haven when this one was written, why didn’t the company inform prospective buyers of that?" Looking beyond these objections, Walker concluded with a recommendation, saying, "The Free City of Haven is indeed 'the best'".

In the June–July 1982 edition of White Dwarf (Issue #31), Lew Pulsipher noted that although there was a lot of material included, "there are few maps of individual buildings, and many buildings are unaccounted for, not surprising in a city this size." Pulsipher believed this was a supplement that would appeal to players interested in role-playing rather than combat, saying, "The place is designed for hard-core role-players, fans of improvisational theatre who enjoy a long chat with an NPC as much as they enjoy a fight", and he warned that for that reason, "the referee should be experienced and patient." Pulsipher gave the supplement an above average rating of 9 out of 10.

In the March–April 1985 edition of Space Gamer (No. 73), Rick Swan reviewed the 1984 boxed set, and commented that "It's an excellent design, and the enthusiasm the designers brought to the project is evident throughout. If the characters occasionally lapse into stereotypes and if the scenarios occasionally seem overly familiar . . . given the size and scope of Haven, such flaws are easy to forgive."

In the October 1988 edition of Games International, Paul Mason disliked that only the first third of material about this campaign setting appeared in The Free City of Haven, noting that players would have to purchase the second volume to get another third of the material, and that the final volume had never been published, leaving the city setting incomplete. Mason called it "the stupidity of putting out an incomplete product in the hope that sales of the first few (mainly unusable parts) will enable the publishers to produce the rest." Mason liked what material had been provided, commenting, "characters tend to be described in some detail, and most of the plots in the frequent scenario suggestions revolve around something other than dungeon adventures. Some of these are quite convoluted, and are good examples of the kind of political intrigues that can embroil the players within a fully developed city." Mason concluded, "On balance, though, the poor production values and inconsistent format ... make this one to pick up if you find it going cheap, but not one to hunt out."

In his 1990 book The Complete Guide to Role-Playing Games, game critic Rick Swan called this "Grim and gritty ... a meticulously detailed city." Swan was particularly impressed by the character descriptions, "fully integrated into a rigid social system, ripe with possibilities for creative referees." Swan concluded by giving this a rating of 3 out of 4, saying, "The material is somewhat easier to digest than that of the similarly serious Harn, making Haven the best of the generic settings for hard-core role-players."

In a retrospective review of The Free City of Haven in Black Gate, John ONeill said "once you got past the cheap packaging, The Free City of Haven delivers all kinds of wonders. The zip-lock bag came with a huge, fold-out color map of the city, sectioned off into boroughs with names like the Outlands, Commons, and North Corridor — and a dangerous nest of curving streets in the slums called the Labyrinth."
