= Minifigs (company) =

Manufacturer of metal miniatures

- Industry: Miniature wargaming
- Genre: Scale models
- Headquarters: Southampton (1974–2009); Nottingham (2009–present)
- Products: Metal miniature figures

Minifigs was a British manufacturer of metal miniatures. The company started as a small manufacturer of historical figures for wargames, but following the rise of Dungeons & Dragons and other table-top fantasy role-playing games in the mid-1970s, it became a principal manufacturer of fantasy miniatures for some time. After being sold to Caliver Books, the company name was changed to Miniature Figurines.

== History ==
In 1964, an avid British wargamer in Southampton, Neville Dickinson, started casting his own 15 mm historical soldier miniatures for his games. Shortly afterwards, Dick Higgs met Dickinson and offered to design figures that Dickinson could then cast and sell. The two soon created Minifigs, and in 1967, Dickinson and Higgs opened their own shop and were soon doing mail order business to American wargamers. This led to the opening of Minifigs America in Pine Plains, New York in 1973.

In 1974, Dave Higgs joined the team as a designer, and created several lines of 25 mm figures for the Hundred Years War, the English Civil War, and Napoleonic armies. In the mid-1970s, after the publication of Dungeons & Dragons and other fantasy role-playing games, Dick Higgs created several ranges of fantasy figures to meet a burgeoning demand. Minifigs also acquired the official license to create 25 mm fantasy figures for Dungeons & Dragons., as well as figures for TSR's World of Greyhawk, and Valley of the Four Winds figures for Games Workshop.

By the early 1980s, demand for Minifigs products was falling, and John Rankin, writing for The Space Gamer, reported that "Minifigs America, once the monster of the midway in this business, has also had cash flow problems. The less-than-spectacular showing of their single-pack fantasy figures and hard times for the parent British company have made times rough. As if that weren't enough, Minifigs' TSR license (World of Greyhawk) probably won't be renewed. While Minifigs remains a prolific producer of historical figures, the fantasy market is what currently drives this industry, and Minifigs' steady loss of share is disturbing." Minifigs recovered by acquiring a UK license to create and sell fantasy figures from Ral Partha Enterprises.

In the 1990s, Minifigs returned to its original business of historical wargaming figures. In 1997, Dickinson retired and Dave Higgs took control of the company, launching a 12 mm World War II range the following year, as well as a modern range of figures covering various armed forces around the world.

In 2009, Caliver Books, publisher of military history, bought Minifigs, changed the name to Miniature Figurines and moved production from Southampton to Nottingham.

== Reception ==
In the April 1975 issue of Airfix Magazine, Bruce Quarrie complimented a new range of ancient military horses and ponies, commenting, "All the new horses are in the correct proportions recently adopted by Minifigs, and each is in itself a work of art ... The only real complaint we have is that the Moorish ponies look more like hairy horses." Quarrie did not like the new science fiction line, "most of which defy description though some look rather like Coco the Clown on a bad day. These figures are all rather crudely executed and do little justice to the fine detail of which Minifigs have proved themselves capable." However Quarrie called a new line of American Revolution figures "undoubtedly amongst this firm's best yet, with some remarkably delicate undercuts and details such as straps and other accountrements. Every figure is cast in a notably realistic stance, though some lend themselves more to the diorama than the wargames table." In the December 1976 issue, Quarrie complimented Minifigs on a new line of ancient figures, calling them "quite superb, without a doubt vastly superior to anything Minifigs have ever done before. Cut by a new designer, the traditional Minifigs 'Harry Secombe' chubbiness is practically gone, and the overall detail and individual character is excellent ... it strikes us that Minifigs should perhaps let [the new designer] have a go at improving several of their other ranges." Quarrie was also impressed by a new Napoleonic line, writing, "these too have a far greater air of individual personality than previously. Similarly, their horse mouldings continue to improve, although they still tend to be rather narrow-shouldered and broad in the posterior."

In Issue 48 of The Space Gamer, Spalding Boldrick called the production quality of Minifigs "variable", noting, "The quality of casting is always first rate, and detailing is always clean and crisp, but the style and imagination of the figures varies so much from line to line that it's almost as if they were being produced by different companies. For example, I've always found their old 'Official D&D' fine to be dull and unimaginative, but their 'Valley of the Four Winds' series is excellent in both imagination and execution. The Greyhawk series is somewhere in between, but largely quite good." Boldrick concluded, "One drawback to almost all Minifigs figures: everybody tends to look alike, as though the entire world suffered from a high degree of inbreeding."

In a retrospective review in Warning Order, Matt Irsik recalled, "Although not quite Lord of the Rings sanctioned figures, Minifigs were the closest thing. For years and years no D&D gaming group went forward without using Minifgs miniatures for orcs, kobolds, knights, and many other things. They were a great deal money-wise, readily available, and back then there weren't too many other choices ... Great for back then, but they haven't stood the test of time."
