= Swordbearer (role-playing game) =

1982 game

Original Heritage USA edition, cover art by Dennis Loubet

Swordbearer is a fantasy role-playing game published by Heritage Games in 1982, and then republished by Fantasy Games Unlimited (FGU) in 1985. The game featured a number of original innovations, but despite good critical reception, it failed to find an audience under either publisher.

== Contents ==
Swordbearer is a fantasy game system with concepts that were new to fantasy role-playing games of the time.

=== Spheres ===
Unlike the popular role-playing games of the time Dungeons & Dragons and RuneQuest, characters in Swordbearer have no classes or professions, instead learning whatever skills are appropriate from six different "spheres" of skills. A character that specializes in a Sphere can learn related skills more quickly.

=== Status ===
There is no money in Swordbearer. Instead, everyone has a Social Status ranked from 1 (slaves and indentured servants) to 17 or higher (nobility). A character with a certain status can obtain any item of the same status. For example, a character with Status 7 is assumed to have the wherewithal to obtain any Status 7 item. If a Status 5 character finds a Status 9 item, the character's Social Status rises to 9.

=== Magic ===
The rules suggest for new players that magic can be set aside at the start of the game and then added as they gain experience in role-playing. Magic is done with "nodes", aligned to various elemental or spiritual forces. Each node's power can be linked to a specific spell. The elemental forces are somewhat similar to the Chinese Five Elements theory, with Crystal, Light/Dark, Wood, Metal, Fire, Water and Wind. Spiritual types are Vitriolic, Phlegmatic, Choleric and Melancholic. (Unlike other role-playing games of the time, clerics and priests have no special "divine magic" abilities.)

However, a number of calculations are needed to apply magic. For example, once the character has located and identified the appropriate node of energy, and aligned the node to a spell, then the character must see if their attempt to cast the spell is successful by consulting the alignment equation: ([5 x current power of aligned mode] - [25 x strength of node to be aligned] + 75).

=== Terrain ===
Terrain in Swordbearer is important. For example, there are differences in the ease or difficulty of wading through or boating on various types of watercourses, and maps feature nine classes of terrain and vegetation from desert through to jungle.

=== Other innovations ===
- Encumbrance, usually a matter of calculating the weight of everything the character is carrying in other role-playing games of the time, is drastically simplified: Every character can possess a maximum of 10 "items", although the definition of an "item" is loose: an "item" could be a retainer, a castle plus all its attendants, etc.
- There are a very large number of playable character races: in addition to the usual elves, dwarves, humans, etc. used in other fantasy role-playing games of the time, Swordbearer also includes dragons, centaurs, gargoyles, as well as original races like bunrabs (humanoid rabbits) and moonspiders (intelligent arachnids).
- Combat initiative is determined by skill. Every weapon has both an Accuracy and Speed skill; attacks are carried out in descending order by Speed skill.

The "Characters" and "Fighting" book (48 pages) includes character creation, skills, equipment, and combat. The "Elemental Magic" and "Spirit Magic" book (32 pages) describes the magic system in detail. The "Racial Index" and "Gamemaster's Guide" book (48 pages) covers intelligent races, monsters, and how to run the game.

== Publication history ==
Swordbearer was created by B. Dennis Sustare with contributions from Arnold Hendrick, and was published by Heritage USA in 1982 as a digest-sized boxed set with cover art by Dennis Loubet and interior art by David Helber. The game did not sell well.

In 1985, FGU purchased the rights to Swordbearer, and also picked up the old stock of the game from Heritage, which FGU's Scott Bizar felt should be a necessary part of the deal. FGU then republished the game in the same format with new cover art by Bill Willingham; later that year, FGU published a second edition as a full-sized boxed set containing two books (one 60 pages and one 32 pages).

FGU published one supplement, Dwarven Halls, detailing the dwarves and other inhabitants of a long valley, which is designed to be transplanted into any campaign setting.

Sales of the FGU edition of Swordbearer also languished and it eventually went out of print with no further supplements published.

== Reception ==
In Issue 71 of Dragon (March 1983), Ken Rolston reviewed the Heritage USA edition and called the game rules "intelligent, logical, and full of sensible advice ... a thought-provoking and imagination-stirring fantasy role-playing game." Rolston thought the best part of the rules were "a self-consistent magic system with an appealing atmosphere of ritual and drama, an unusually detailed character generation system, and the finest advice, common sense, and experienced wisdom on gamesmastering ever collected under one cover." Writing in 1983, Rolston foresaw that Heritage USA would have difficulty making headway against industry giants like Dungeons & Dragons and RuneQuest. He suggested that aggressive marketing of the game was needed, and believed that the small digest-sized box "is a poor step in that direction" although the low price of only $10 was attractive. Rolston also believed that further scenarios and supplements "of superior quality" should immediately be made available to aid in marketing.

Ken Rolston reviewed Swordbearer for Different Worlds magazine and stated that "If Heritage were to publish some first-class support materials for Swordbearer - some well-written scenarios, particularly - gamers might begin to consider adopting Swordbearer as their campaign system. Unless there is some evidence that the publisher is going to support the product with the same high quality of supplements as are available for D&D, RQ, and T&T, it is unlikely that they will risk switching over to the new system, in spite of the obvious qualities of Swordbearer. In the meantime, anyone who plays FRP games will find this game well worth the [...] price tag."

In his 1990 book The Complete Guide to Role-Playing Games, game critic Rick Swan called this "Swords and sorcery for grad students ... a sophisticated alternative for those bored with Advanced Dungeons & Dragons and RuneQuest." Although Swan liked some of the innovations around skills and magic, "In the end, Swordbearer's complexity overwhelms its clever ideas. The simplest combat engagements can take ages to complete, and even modest mathematical errors ... can produce wildly inaccurate results." Swan concluded by giving the game a rating of 2.5 out of 4, saying, "The material is clearly presented, and referee hints abound, but the amount of effort required to master the game mechanics make Swordbearer virtually unplayable."
