= Britannia (board game) =

Strategy board game

- Box art for Britannia Second Edition
- Publication: 1986
- Genres: strategy

Britannia is a strategy board game, first released and published in 1986 by Gibsons Games in the United Kingdom, and The Avalon Hill Game Company in 1987 in the United States, and most recently updated in late 2008 as a re-release of the 2005 edition, produced by Fantasy Flight Games. It broadly depicts the wars in, and migrations to, the island of Great Britain in the centuries from the Roman invasions to the Norman Conquest.

Britannia was selected among the anthology Hobby Games: The 100 Best and is ranked by members of the Board Game Geek site in the top 350 of over 10,000 ranked games. Britannia has spawned a subgenre of wargames characterized by epic time scales with players taking the part of multiple tribes or nations over the course of the game.

== Components ==
- a rulebook
- a board depicting a map of the island of Britain
- 251 unit markers in red, blue, yellow and green representing infantry, cavalry, leaders, Roman forts and Saxon Burhs.
- 17 nation cards with information about each nation
- 175 victory point tokens in denominations of 1, 5 and 25
- 16 population markers
- one sword-shaped game round marker
- five white, six-sided combat dice

== Gameplay ==
The game laid out

Britannia is a three-to-five player game that takes about four hours to complete. Primary rules are for four players using the counter colours, but there are variant scenarios for three and five players, as well as a three-player shorter game and several short two-player scenarios. Each player controls several nations.

The game begins with one army in each area of Britain, with each part of the island occupied by different nations: the Belgae, Welsh, Brigantes, Caledonians (representing the distinctive Broch culture) and Picts. A force of Romans begin in the English Channel and are the first nation to move. Through their superior fighting power and mobility the Romans will come to dominate most of the board, but eventually the Roman Empire will withdraw their forces from Britain completely, leaving behind just the scattered Romano-British. Meanwhile, throughout the game, further nations arrive from across the seas: the Irish and Scots, and later the Dubliners, from the west; the Norsemen from the north; the Saxons, Angles, Danes and Norwegians from the east; the Jutes and Normans from the south. All of these nations will compete with each other, as well as the existing nations, for turf. Some nations will be destroyed, and the recurring theme in Britannia is that nations will rise and fall. However all nations will make their contribution to a player's Victory Point total and eventual victory or defeat.

At the end of the game all four players will have the possibility to become the King of England through their control of Harold the Saxon, William of Normandy, Harald Hardrada and Svein Estrithson. It is possible that no nation will be king if all four of these leaders have been killed or if they lack the required number of regions. However this in itself will not determine who will win the game.

Nations take their turns in strict order, each taking one turn in each Game Round.

Each nation's turn has five phases.

Population Increase Phase
In this phase nations other than the Romans count the territory they hold and may be able to add new armies to the board through natural increase of population.
Movement Phase
In this phase a nation may move none, some or all of its pieces on the board. Distances are generally limited, but some nations may be able to move pieces along the coasts using boats. Also new forces arriving from across the sea will be able to land. Roman and cavalry forces can move further than infantry, as can forces with leaders.
Battles/Retreats Phase
Where a nation has moved forces into an area held by another nation a battle will occur. Once all movement is complete battles are resolved with the aid of dice. Battles are conducted in rounds and forces of both sides may retreat after each round. The ability of nations to retreat and fight another day is a major part of the flavour of gameplay.
Raider Withdrawal Phase
Some nations have designated Game Rounds called Raiding Turns which allow their forces to remain at sea, or return to the sea after making an attack on the land. These forces will return in later Game Rounds.
Overpopulation Phase
At the end of their turn if a nation other than the Romans has more armies than twice the number of areas held, the excess armies are removed due to overpopulation.

A nation is made up of several different playing pieces:

Army
These represent the fighting forces of the nation, as well as possessing some characteristics of population.
Leader
These have no combat strength in themselves, but increase the combat strength of all forces they are with. Named leaders appear on various Game Rounds for specific nations throughout the game.
Fort
These represent Roman Forts. The Romans build a fort in each area they conquer. These fight as normal armies and may not move. The Romans must protect their forts, as they can only score on Round V for areas that contain an undestroyed fort. If a fort is destroyed it is turned over onto its destroyed side, to show that the Romans failed to protect that area. Forts may not be rebuilt.
Burh
These represent Saxons fortified settlements or Burhs. These may be built if the Saxons hold less than a set limit of areas on certain Rounds, and help the Saxons build up their strength for resisting the expansion of the Danelaw late in the game.

The player whose nations have achieved the highest Victory Point total at the end of the game is the winner. Nations can score Victory Points on any Game Round, such as for eliminating certain opposing pieces or temporarily capturing certain areas, but will mostly score for holding different areas of Britain during the Scoring Rounds of Round V, VII, X, XIII and XVI. Also nations can score additional points by achieving Bretwalda or King of England. Nations all have their own Victory Point objectives listed on their Nation cards, and each player colour will accumulate Victory Points at different rates through the game. This means that at any given moment who is actually winning will not be immediately obvious. Experienced players develop an idea of what typical scores are at different stages of a game and so will be able to tell what is really going on.

An ideal game ends with a close finish with several players still being able to win, and the outcome resting on one battle or roll of the dice.

== Development history ==
This game was created by Lewis Pulsipher in 1983 under the working title of Invasions. It was first published by Gibsons Games as Britannia from 1986 in the United Kingdom in two slightly different versions after development by Roger Heyworth. A German-language version was released by Welt der Spiele and the game was later republished in the United States by Avalon Hill. The game developed a devoted following across the world, generating variants and additions. One of the most popular additions was the 'Oh Danny Boy' By Jim Lawler, which included a variant for the First Edition rules. The rules included Isle of Man (part of England) and 4 Irish areas, an extra leader 'Brian Boru' was also an option.

In 2003, after a long break from board game work and having regained the publishing rights, Lewis Pulsipher announced he would be extensively revising the game, a great deal of player input contributed to the revision, which not only tidied up the rules, but also brought in a number of new features. Consequently, the newest version published by Fantasy Flight Games is sometimes known as Britannia Second Edition, or Britannia II. This version was first published in 2005, and when the first print run sold out a reprint was produced in 2008, incorporating all official errata and corrections, as well as new language versions in German, French, Spanish and Hungarian. The Fantasy Flight version went out of print in mid-2012.

A new edition, including two new, shorter games (one diceless) using new boards has been developed by Pulsipher, the designer. This was published in 2020 by PSC Games. It includes a two-player 'Duel Britannia' game.

Pulsipher is said to be working on 'Epic Britannia', an extension to include the Isle of Man and six areas in Ireland. Other possible options include extra Welsh leaders and Danish Burhs.

== Changes between versions ==
At each stage of development and publication of Britannia changes were made to the rules of the game, as well as to the scenario and materials:

Map
On the hand-drawn map in the original Invasions prototype there was just one Mercia area, and several areas had different names, such as Somerset, which would later be Avalon, and Berkshire, which would later become Downlands. The Gibsons version introduced North and South Mercia, and rearranged the connection of areas around the Pennines, while changing marshy Somerset into lowlands and lowland Berkshire into highlands. This map, painted in dark shades of green and blue, was retained for later versions until the Fantasy Flight Games (FFG) version, which slightly changed the Pennines area again and cleared up the sea area connections in the Skye region. The Avalon Hill mapboard incorporated the Turn Record Chart down each side of the board. In previous versions the events of the game were listed on a card for each of the four players. The onboard Timeline was reimplemented by FFG, and their artwork for the land changed to predominantly yellow, with a rather enlarged map compared to previous versions.
Colours
The original prototype used Blue, Red, Green and Yellow for the different player pieces. The first Gibsons version had Purple, Brown, Red and Blue, with the Brown pieces becoming Black in their later version and in the Welt der Spiele version. Avalon Hill changed these counters to Green. This led to players of the different versions calling this coalition 'BBG' or Brown-Black-Green. FFG then changed the Purple counters to Yellow.
Scenario
In the prototype the Irish were allied to the Romans, and this was changed to the Irish joining the Red coalition in the Gibsons version, and all subsequent versions. For the non-standard games every version had slight changes to which nations were controlled by which player. Gibsons introduced a short game. Small changes were made to many of the forces arriving in the game between the prototype and the Gibsons version, and later for FFG's version, which also added more leaders. In FFG's version Round V became a Victory Point counting turn instead of Turn 4. The FFG version also includes several two-player games and a changed version of the short game.
Rules
In 1983 the Invasions prototype was submitted by Lewis Pulsipher to Gibsons for evaluation and testing, and most development work was done by Roger Heyworth without referring back to the designer. This had been Pulsipher's last design before effectively retiring from game design. This led to a number of areas being confused and not entirely in line with the designer's intention. By 2004 when Pulsipher first saw the published version of Britannia being played at a convention he was surprised by some of the tactics that were allowed by the rules, especially in terms of their historicity. One major area of change between the intention of the prototype and the Gibsons and Avalon Hill versions was how raiding worked. In these games raiders could 'hang around forever' at sea without committing to landing. These and other areas in the rules were cleared up with the advent of the FFG version, reducing the need for players to clarify rules amongst themselves, as had been the case during the period between the Avalon Hill and FFG versions. The 2008 version removed any lingering detailed issues with the 2005 version, including the nation turn order listed on the map.
New concepts
FFG's Britannia II has introduced the new concepts of Roman Roads and Roman Reinforcements, Belgae submission and the Boudiccan Rebellion, and a four kings ending instead of three, with the addition of Svein Estrithsson. Britannia II also includes rules for players to bid amongst themselves to take particular sides in an auction, in part to address any perceived imbalance between the colours.

== Reimplementation ==
The game Maharaja, also published by Avalon Hill, reimplemented the same system, on the Indian subcontinent.

Other published designs using systems developed from the Britannia pattern with additional complexity include Hispania, covering the Iberian Peninsula and Italia, covering Italy.

== List of leaders ==
- Angles: Ida, Oswiu, Offa
- Belgae: Boudicca
- Brigantes: Urien
- Danes: Ivar & Halfdan (as one leader), Cnut, Svein Estrithsson
- Dubliners: Olaf Guthfrithson
- Normans: William
- Norwegians: Harald Hardrada
- Norsemen: Ketil Flatnose
- Romano-British: Arthur
- Saxons: Aelle, Egbert, Alfred, Edgar, Harold
- Scots: Fergus Mor Mac Erc

== List of areas ==
=== England ===
- Avalon
- Bernicia
- Cheshire
- Cumbria
- Downlands
- Essex
- Galloway
- Hwicce
- Kent
- Lindsey
- Lothian
- March
- Norfolk
- North Mercia
- Pennines
- South Mercia
- Suffolk
- Sussex
- Wessex
- York

=== Scotland ===
- Alban
- Caithness
- Dalriada
- Dunedin
- Hebrides
- Mar
- Moray
- Orkneys
- Skye
- Strathclyde

=== Wales ===
- Clwyd
- Cornwall
- Devon
- Dyfed
- Gwent
- Gwynedd
- Powys

=== Seas ===
- Icelandic Sea
- North Sea
- Frisian Sea
- English Channel
- Atlantic Ocean
- Irish Sea

== Reviews ==
- Casus Belli #45 (June 1988)
- Perfidious Albion #71 (p2-4)
