= The Tavern (accessory) =

Role-playing game supplement

The Tavern is a 1983 role-playing game supplement published by Genesis Gaming Products.

== Contents ==
The Tavern is a supplement in which a modular play aid is designed for medieval or fantasy role-playing games. The product includes three large color cardstock sheets depicting a fully furnished inn—complete with rooms, benches, and a courtyard—and an eight-page booklet detailing the tavern's layout, staff, and patrons. While most furniture is fixed in place, some items like barrels and chests are movable, and the map sections can be rearranged or selectively used to suit different scenarios. The booklet provides character descriptions and scenario ideas in a generic format compatible with systems like D&D, The Fantasy Trip, and RuneQuest.

The Tavern provides a detailed depiction of a typical medieval tavern. It includes cardstock map sheets scaled for 25mm miniatures, which can be arranged in various configurations to suit different layouts. The set also offers suggestions for scenarios.

== Publication history ==
The Tavern was written by Arnold Hendrick and David Helber, with art by Helber and Tom Maxwell and published by Genesis Gaming Products in 1983 as an 8-page booklet with three large color cardstock sheets.

The Tavern was originally developed by Heritage before its closure.

Shannon Appelcline noted that "Genesis Gaming Products - a division of World Wide Wargames (3W) - picked up the Dwarfstar Games, but their sole production ended up being a 'dungeon floor,' Arnold Hendrick and David Helber's The Tavern (1983)."

== Reception ==
Steve Jackson reviewed The Tavern for Fantasy Gamer magazine and stated that "All in all, a nice little addition to any campaign with a medieval or rustic setting."
