= Spacefarers Guide to Alien Monsters =

Role-playing game supplement

Spacefarers Guide to Alien Monsters is a 1979 role-playing game supplement published by Phoenix Games.

== Contents ==
Spacefarers Guide to Alien Monsters is a supplement which includes 350 different creatures, and many detailed animal and plant encounters for science-fiction role-playing games.

== Reception ==
William A. Barton reviewed Spacefarers Guide to Alien Monsters in The Space Gamer No. 34. Barton commented that "If [...] you don't mind the work involved - or your imagination's running a bit dry this week - Spacefarers Guide to Alien Monsters could easily prove to be a fruitful addition to your SF role-playing campaign."

== Reviews ==
- Dragon #34 (Feb., 1980)
