= Star Smuggler =

1982 board game

Star Smuggler is a 1982 board game published by Heritage/Dwarfstar.

== Gameplay ==
Star Smuggler is a game for one in which the player is Duke Springer, who accumulates his fortune by trading any goods and services he can acquire using his starship in the ten-system Pavonis Sector to pay off his debt.

== Reception ==
Steve List reviewed Star Smuggler in The Space Gamer No. 60. List commented that "It is an interesting, if not altogether successful, attempt at creating a one-player RPG. My qualified recommendation is to give it a look. You just might like it."

== Reviews ==
- Dragon #66
