= Grav Armor =

Board game

Cover art by Bob Depew, 1982

Grav Armor is a science fiction tank combat board game published by Heritage Models in 1982.

== Description ==
Grav Armor is a two-player science-fiction tank wargame designed by Arnold Hendrick, with graphic design by David Helber, with Tom Maxwell, and cover art by Bob Depew. It was published by Heritage Models as part of their Dwarfstar Games line.

The microgame comes in a small box and includes

- six 4"x7" full-color geomorphic maps
- 154 counters in three colors, most representing either ten vehicles or 100 infantry, others representing fighters, tanks, cities and forts
- two six-sided dice
- an information sheet
- 24-page book containing rules and scenarios

The maps display five different colors of terrain, but these can represent anything demanded by the scenario. For example, in one scenario, blue hexes could represent water, in the next scenario they could be snowy tundra or rough terrain. The six maps can be combined to provide many different configurations. A hex represents 50 kilometres.

== Gameplay ==
One player represents the forces of the Lerlam Empire, while the other plays the rebels of the Panumatic League.

=== Electronic warfare (EW) ===
Unlike other wargames that require "line of sight" (LOS) before a unit can fire on another unit, in Grav Armor, a unit can fire if its Electronic Warfare (EW) rating is higher than the terrain rating through which the defending unit is moving, and the target is within range.

=== Movement and firing ===
Unlike many wargames where the first player both moves and fires before the second player's turn, in Grav Armor, the first player moves one unit at a time, but the second player fires anytime during the first player's movement where the firing unit's EW can detect the moving target, and the target is within range. If the second player decides to fire, the first player ceases to move the unit, and the combat is resolved. If the unit survives, the first player continues to move the unit.

Once all the first player's units have been moved, the players switch roles, the second player moving units, while the first player fires.

=== Combat resolution ===
To resolve combat, the Combat Result Table (CRT) is used. The total of the target's defense value, EW rating and terrain value are subtracted from the sum of the attacker's EW, attack factor and weapon bonuses (if any). Two dice are thrown, and the total of the dice (2–12) is cross-referenced on the CRT against the attacker/target difference (-10 to +10). The result is either "Hit" or "Miss". Only one hit is needed to destroy anything except infantry and forts. A hit on an infantry unit disrupts it for one move; cities can take partial damage before being destroyed.

The victory conditions vary from scenario to scenario.

== Reception ==
In the September 1982 edition of The Space Gamer (No. 55), John Rankin commented that "Despite [its] glitches, the game works, and it works well. There's more than enough detail to satisfy the simulation freak, and yet the mechanics are so streamlined that with practice the battle flows very smoothly. The armored united have personality and their diversity, combined with terrain and other variables, makes for a totally new game with every play. It's a big game in a small package and this translates to excellent value for the money."

In the May 1983 edition of Dragon (Issue #73), Tony Watson liked the quality of the components, calling them "attractive and of good quality." He also thought the wide variety of units and the versatility of the geomorphic maps were a strong point. Although he found the scenarios were "interesting tactical situations and are reasonably well-balanced," he noted that "one of the weak points of the game is its lack of context; exactly who the two sides are, and why these battles are important is glossed over." Despite this, he believed that players would be able to design new scenarios or even an entire campaign fairly easily. Watson concluded, "Grav Armor is not a particularly innovative game, but it is certainly solid, well thought out, and quite playable... Grav Armor is certainly a worthy addition to the genre, and is recommended for those interested in futuristic tank games."

== Awards ==
At the 1983 Origins Awards, Grav Armor was a finalist for the Charles S. Roberts Award for Best Science Fiction Board Game of 1982.
