= The Mines of Keridav =

Tabletop role-playing game adventure

The Mines of Keridav is a 1979 fantasy role-playing game adventure published by Phoenix Games.

== Plot summary ==
The Mines of Keridav is an adventure in which the player characters journey through the valley of Tiraval as they try to save the Princess who was captured by the evil wizard Keridav; the adventure is intended for use with nearly any fantasy role-playing system, such as Chivalry & Sorcery, RuneQuest, and Dungeons & Dragons.

== Publication history ==
The Mines of Keridav was written by Kerry Lloyd, with a cover by Bob Charrette, and was published by Phoenix Games in 1979 as a 24-page book; a second edition was published by Gamelords in 1983 as a 28-page book including statistics for Thieves' Guild.

Kerry Lloyd wrote his first published work, the "generic fantasy" adventure The Mines of Keridav (1979), which was published through Maryland game company Phoenix Games. In 1983, Gamelords reprinted The Mines of Keridav for their Thieves' Guild role-playing game.

== Reception ==
Richard A. Edwards reviewed The Mines of Keridav in The Space Gamer No. 33. Edwards commented that "The Mines of Keridav is a step forward. No longer must other FRP systems adapt D&D-oriented material to theirs. The heavy emphasis on the above-ground adventure is a real bonus over the now-prolific use of underground room to room scenarios. This is a real bonus to any game master's library of adventures."

Larry DiTillio reviewed The Mines of Keridav for Different Worlds magazine and stated that "The module [...] offers possibilities for expansion and would be fairly simple to integrate into a campaign, though I think its better use is as a starting point for a new campaign of beginning role-players. It offers very little for veterans of fantasy role-playing and my recommendation to the hard core is pass. If you are a new gamemaster and want an easy-to-run module with lots of outlets for role-playing, plunk your bucks down, ignore the cover and the maps, and buy The Mines of Keridav."
