= Dragonriders of Pern (picture book game) =

Dragonriders of Pern is a 1984 picture book game published by Nova.

== Gameplay ==
Dragonriders of Pern is a picture-book game with a similar design to Ace of Aces, in this case involving 115 numbered full-page illustrations portraying wingmates trying to burn Thread as in the Dragonriders of Pern novels.

== Reception ==
Lester W. Smith reviewed Dragonriders of Pern in The Space Gamer No. 75. Smith commented that "I found Dragonriders of Pern to be my second-favorite set in the picture-book series, just behind the Handy Rotary planes, and recommend it to anyone, diehard McCaffrey fan or not. At [the price] it may not be a bargain, but it is a good value for the money."

== Reviews ==
- Isaac Asimov's Science Fiction Magazine
- Asimov's Science Fiction v9 n8 (1985 08)
- Jeux & Stratégie #44 (as "Vous Etes Le Maitre du Dragon")
