= Demonlord (board game) =

Board game

Demonlord is a two-player board game published in 1981 by Dwarfstar Games, a division of Heritage Models.

== Gameplay ==
Demonlord, designed by Arnold Hendrick, is a game of conquest in which one player plays as the Demon Empire, and the other opposes them as the Alliance of Hosar.

The game components of the boxed set are:

- a 12" x 14" hex map printed on heavy cardstock
- 154 counters
- a 24-page rulebook

Each turn is composed of five phases:

1. Unit Movement
2. Invocation
3. Battles
4. Sieges
5. Alliances

Players maneuver their armies across the map. The travel speed of each unit varies depending on the type of unit and the type of terrain. Combat occurs when two armies occupy the same hex. The involved counters are removed from the map and lined up against each other in two lines of battle. Leaders can be stacked with army units, using their spells to try to break the morale of their enemies. Three factors determine victory: missile fire, melee value and morale. If either missile fire or melee hits the target, the defender must make a morale check. A roll lower than the morale check means the unit is untouched. Matching the morale of the unit means the unit is captured. (Players can trade captured units.) Failing the moral check destroys the unit.

Two other unusual features include that terrain affects the conduct of a battle, and it is possible to hold units in reserve. For example, if a battle is fought on a plain, then a larger number of units can be engaged than if fought in the forest or mountains. A smaller number of units fighting on terrain favoring defense could do much better than on open terrain. A set of four units might have to engage a dozen enemy units simultaneously if attacked on a plain, but could engage only four at a time on defensive terrain. The attacker could decide which four units to send to the front first, holding the rest in reserve.

Attackers can also besiege castles and walled cities, choosing either to surround and invest (less costly but slower), or assault the walls (fast but deadly).

Both sides can try to convince one or more of the five neutral countries on the map to come to their aid. Each player gains victory points for controlling more fortresses than the opponent, holding enemy cities, winning battles and having fewer allies than the other player.

Victory is achieved by either conquering the opponent's capital city, or by reaching a given number of victory points, which varies from scenario to scenario.

== Reception ==
In the December 1981 edition of The Space Gamer (Issue No. 46), Aaron Allston liked the game's good value, commenting, "Demonlord is quite a buy. I recommend it."

In the January 1982 edition of Ares (Issue 12), Steve List thought the game was good but not great: "Demonlord is not an overwhelming game, but is well put together and plays nicely. It naturally shares some ideas with other fantasy army games, but has many original elements that distinguish it; it is well worth looking into."

In the March 1982 edition of Dragon (Issue 59), Tony Watson thought the game lived up to its subtitle, "The Epic Game of Sorcery and Conquest." Watson found the game components well-made and attractive, the combat system was "intelligent", and the game had a high replay value. Given its cost of only $5, Watson thought the game excellent value, saying, "I was quite pleased with the game; it’s fun to play, colorful and filled with interesting little nuances."
