= Crypt of the Sorcerer (miniatures game) =

Miniatures game published by Heritage Models

Crypt of the Sorcerer is a miniatures game published by Heritage Models.

== Gameplay ==
Crypt of the Sorcerer is a kit for fantasy miniatures gaming, including miniatures of four adventurers and four monsters in lead, paints with painting tips, and an adventure scenario.

== Publication history ==
Crypt of the Sorcerer was designed by Arnold Hendrick and published in 1980 by Heritage Models.

== Reception ==
Jay Rudin reviewed Crypt of the Sorcerer in The Space Gamer No. 30. Rudin commented that "It comes down to eight miniatures and two hours' worth of gaming—total. There's nothing criminal about it except you can get much better for less money. It might be helpful for beginners, but if you're enough of a gamer to be reading The Space Gamer, you don't need it."
