= Traveller Adventure 3: Twilight's Peak =

Science-fiction role-playing game supplement

Traveller Adventure 3
Twilight's Peak
- Publishers: Game Designers' Workshop
- Publication: 1980; 46 years ago
- Genres: Science fiction
- Systems: Classic Traveller

Traveller Adventure 3: Twilight's Peak is a 1980 role-playing game adventure for Traveller published by Game Designers' Workshop.

== Plot summary ==
Twilight's Peak is an adventure in which the player characters seek the lost Twilight's Peak drug convoy, and discover the secrets of the long-dead Ancients.

== Reception ==
William A. Barton reviewed Twilight's Peak in The Space Gamer No. 34. Barton commented that "If there are any serious flaws to be found in Twilight's Peak, this reviewer was unable to locate them. It is the best adventure thus far created for Traveller. Don't pass this one up - not even for a cargo hold of advanced powered battle armor."

Andy Slack reviewed Twilight's Peak for White Dwarf #24, giving it an overall rating of 10 out of 10, and stated that "In conclusion, I can only say: This is how Traveller should be. Buy it."

Twilight's Peak was awarded the H.G. Wells Award for "Best Roleplaying Adventure of 1980".

== Reviews ==
- Analog Science Fiction and Fact

== See also ==
- Classic Traveller adventures
