= Calandia Guidebook =

Role-playing game supplement

Cover art by Robert Gould

Calandia Guidebook is a fantasy role-playing game supplement published by Mayfair Games in 1989 for the City State of the Invincible Overlord campaign setting.

== Contents ==
Calandia Guidebook is a supplement in which background information is provided for exploring Calandia, the world that contains the City State of the Invincible Overlord.

The boxed set contains three booklets:

- "The Calandia Guidebook" (40 pages) that covers Calandia's cosmology, history, culture, government, and economy.
- "Religion in Calandia" (24 pages) gives details of 22 gods and demigods and their worshipers.
- "Calandian Dictionary" (32 pages) explains the Calandian language.

== Publication history ==
Following the publication of Dungeons & Dragons by TSR in 1974, Judges Guild published City State of the Invincible Overlord, a large and detailed look at the dwarven fortress and town of Thunderhold set in the land of Calandia. Designed for use with the rules of D&D, it was the first published fantasy role-playing game city setting.

The product proved popular, and Judges Guild became a major player in the early role-playing game market. However, as the role-playing games industry moved to professional typesetting, full color art, and slick and hardcovered material in the early 1980s, Judges Guild was slow to adapt, and their AD&D license with TSR lapsed in 1982. Judges Guild ceased publication in 1985, but licensed a City State of the Invincible Overlord line to Mayfair Games from 1987 to 1989.

Mayfair completely revised the City State setting, and published several supplements during this period, including Calandia Guidebook, a boxed set designed by Terry Randall, with cover art by Robert Gould and interior art by Jerry O'Malley. It was published by Mayfair in 1989.

Changes that Mayfair made to the original City State setting were not well received, and the company dropped the City State line in 1989.

== Reception ==
In Issue 5 of the British magazine Games International, Paul Mason found it failed to break new ground, stating, "The Calandia series provides a traditional D&D style background with pleasant presentation. Unfortunately there's absolutely nothing special about it." Mason concluded by giving the product a poor rating of 2 out of 5.
