= Thieves' Guild 9: Escape From the Ashwood Mines =

Tabletop role-playing game supplement

- Cover art by Denis Loubet
- Designers: Robert Traynor, Alfred Hipkins
- Illustrators: Denis Loubet; Becky Harding; Wallace Miller; Larry Shade; Hannah M. G. Shapero; John Statema; Janet Trautvetter
- Publishers: Gamelords
- Publication: 1983
- Genres: Fantasy

Thieves' Guild 9: Escape From the Ashwood Mines is a supplement published by Gamelords in 1983 for the fantasy role-playing game Thieves' Guild. It is the ninth of ten books in the series.

== Contents ==
In the Thieves' Guild fantasy role-playing game, players take on the roles of thieves in an underworld of crime. In a series of supplements, Gamelords presented a number of adventures as well as extra rules. Thieves' Guild 9 is a sourcebook containing new rules for "Armed Robbery" and "Abduction/Escape", as well as two adventures related to these new rules:

- The adventurers must rescue a foreign nobleman, who has been framed for murder and sentenced to the mines. This scenario was used as the flagship for Gamelords' final "Prince of Thieves" tournament in 1984.
- Part 2 of "Secret of the Crystal Mountains": The players continue to seek a treasure of glowing crystals. (Part 1 was in the previously published sourcebook Thieves' Guild 8.)

== Publication history ==
Gamelords first published Thieves' Guild in 1980. Over the next four years, they released nine more supplements, including 1983's Thieves' Guild 9: Escape From the Ashwood Mines, a 32-page softcover book that was written by Robert Traynor and Alfred Hipkins, with cover art by Denis Loubet, and interior artwork by Becky Harding, Wallace Miller, Larry Shade, Hannah M. G. Shapero, John Statema, and Janet Trautvetter.

== Reception ==
In Issue 30 of Abyss (Summer 1984), John Schuller liked the "excellent" material, but warned that the material was "better suited for the experienced and flexible gamemaster rather than the novice." He also pointed out that this material was heavily linked to previously published material, "and unless you have some of the predecessors, some of the general background will be missing, as these adventures continue situations and set-ups from the earlier issues in the series." Schuller concluded, "In general I'd recommend the whole series for those interested in more imaginative concepts of thieving."

John T. Sapienza, Jr. reviewed Thieves' Guild 7, Thieves' Guild 8, Thieves' Guild 9, and Thieves' Guild 10 for Different Worlds and commented "These four volumes illustrate the quality of Gamelords' products. They concentrate on personality and variety to supply the gamemaster with role-playing tools to enrich a campaign, whether or not that campaign uses the Gamelords' world of Haven and whether or not that campaign emphasizes thieving for most of its activity. Most of the scenario ideas do not depend on the existence of a thieves guild – and indeed any party of adventurers could undertake many of the offered outdoor scenarios, although the burglary scenarios do require specialized thieving skills to succeed. The Thieves' Guild series is worth using as an aid in any fantasy campaign."

Chris Hunter reviewed both Thieves' Guild 8 and Thieves' Guild 9 for the British RPG magazine Imagine, and stated that "The scenarios are all very good though some need a little extra work to flesh them out."
