= Hârn (campaign set) =

Tabletop fantasy role-playing game supplement

Regional Module
- Designers: N. Robin Crossby
- Publishers: Columbia Games inc.
- Publication: 1983; 43 years ago
- Genres: Fantasy
- Systems: Generic

Hârn Regional Module is a role-playing game supplement published by Columbia Games in 1983 that introduced the fictional island setting of Hârn. Columbia has subsequently published many supplements that increase the depth of detail about the island and its environs.

== Contents ==
Hârn Regional Module is the first product about Hârn, an island on the planet Kethira about triple the area of Great Britain. The contents of the folio include

- "Hârnview", a 32-page book containing a general overview the island's background, history, religion, economics and culture.
- "Hârndex": a 64-page encyclopedia containing indexed information about the island.
- a 22" x 34" colour map of the island

Hârn is a low-fantasy setting with a minimum of magic, based largely on Norman England, with the addition of some fantasy elements provided by dwarves, elves and orcs.

The information in this folio does not include any kind of role-playing game rules system. Instead, gamemasters of the time were expected to adapt the Hârn world to an existing rules system such as Advanced Dungeons & Dragons or RuneQuest. Columbia Games would later produce HârnMaster, a rules system specifically designed for use with the Hârn setting.

== Publication history ==
In the 1970s, the Canadian game publisher Gamma Two Games was known for board wargames such as Quebec 1759 and family board games such as Klondike. In 1982, the company changed its name to Columbia Games and moved across the border into the United States. A year later, Columbia Games entered the fantasy role-playing game market with Hârn Regional Module, written by N. Robin Crossby, who also drew the map that appears on the cover. A second edition was published in 1985 as a boxed set.

After customers demanded a specific set of role-playing game rules, Columbia produced HârnMaster in 1986. Over the next 30 years, Columbia produced dozens of sourcebooks about Hârn that explored regional characteristics, culture, economics, and religion in greater detail.

== Reception ==
In the September 1983 edition of Dragon (Issue 77), Roger E. Moore was impressed by the enclosed map, calling it "beautiful. If you are a fan of fantasy cartography, the map makes a wonderful addition to one's collection." Due to the lack of ready-made adventures or adventure hooks, Moore recommended the game system for experienced gamemasters "who don't mind using a largely pre-fabricated universe", but warned "It is not a good idea to purchase Harn if you like to extensively alter game material unless you don't mind spending money." He concluded with a recommendation, saying, "Harn should be more than sufficient for most gaming needs [...] It could be better, but it is very good."

Steve Jackson reviewed Hârn for Fantasy Gamer magazine and stated that "Who should buy Harn? Certainly not the novice gamer; this is advanced material, requiring expertise with some chosen system. Harn is for the experienced referee or gaming group that is ready to start a new campaign, It is not "source material" that can easily be taken apart and worked into an existing adventure, To enjoy Harn, you will have to send your characters there, or start a whole new campaign with Harnian folk, If that idea appeals to you, you will probably get many hours of play from Harn."

Morgan Woodward reviewed Hârn for Different Worlds magazine and stated that "The attractiveness of the Harn cover is a winner, and the excellent product within is a long-awaited dream for gamemasters and players alike. I hope that Crossby and friends will produce the Lythia map and other promised Harn playaids, and that other companies will take the hint that among gamers there is a huge hunger for quality work such as Harn. Enjoy."

In the August 1984 edition of White Dwarf (Issue #56), Simon Farrell thought that Hârn "is a useful aid to almost any fantasy role-playing game," but he warned players that there was little information about non-human characters, the setting had very little magic, and statistics for non-player characters were not included. For those reasons, he gave it a below-average overall rating of 6 out of 10.

In his 1990 book The Complete Guide to Role-Playing Games, game critic Rick Swan noted that "Of all the generic settings (including City State of the Invincible Overlord, Haven, and Thieves' World) Harn is the least frivolous and most ambitious." Swan thought the major advantage Harn had over its competitors was that it was "supplemented by dozens of sourcebooks." Swan concluded by giving this product a rating of 3 out of 4, saying "Players expecting a surplus of magic and monsters will be disappointed, but those looking for serious, intelligent adventures can find plenty of them in Harn."
