= Ace of Aces: Wingleader =

Board game published in 1988 by Nova Game Designs

Ace of Aces: Wingleader is a board game published in 1988 by Nova Game Designs.

== Contents ==
Wingleader is a game in which the game system from Ace of Aces is modified to the World War II era.

== Reception ==
Lee Brimmicombe-Wood reviewed Wingleader for Games International magazine, and gave it 4 stars out of 5, and stated that "for those wishing some quick, fun entertainment that is accessible to novice and non-gamers, I can wholeheartedly recommend this one. Chocks Away!"

== Reviews ==
- Fire & Movement #72
- "The Year's Best Games" in Games #101
