= Spacefarers Guide to Alien Races =

Role-playing game supplement

Spacefarers Guide to Alien Races is a 1979 role-playing game supplement published by Phoenix Games.

== Contents ==
Spacefarers Guide to Alien Races details 100 different alien races that can be used for creating characters in science fiction role-playing games.

== Reception ==
William A. Barton reviewed Spacefarers Guide to Alien Races in The Space Gamer No. 33. Barton commented that "If a myriad of alien races from which to choose a character for your next SF role-playing session is your cup of zgwortz, Spacefarers Guide to Alien Races should easily suit you as well as a tentacle does your typical BEM."
