= City State of the Invincible Overlord =

Role-playing game supplement

- Publishers: Judges Guild
- Publication: 1976
- Genres: Role-playing
- Parent games: Dungeons & Dragons

City State of the Invincible Overlord is a fantasy role-playing game supplement originally published by Judges Guild in 1976. It was the first published fantasy role-playing game city setting, designed for use with Dungeons & Dragons (D&D), and officially approved for use with D&D from 1976 through 1983. It was later republished under license by Necromancer Games.

== Development and release ==
Bob Bledsaw and Bill Owen founded Judges Guild in 1976 to sell subscriptions to gamemasters, and began work on a large map inspired by Bledsaw's own Dungeons & Dragons campaign, as a product to make sales. They finished a city map just in time for Gen Con IX (1976). However, because they were not registered vendors, they sat at a card table decorated with a banner but were not allowed to have any maps with them. When they sold a map, they had to take the buyer out to their car in the parking lot and get a map out of the car trunk. At the same convention, they also sold subscriptions for packets of information about the city state. In late 1977, all of the subscription packets were gathered together in a package titled City State of the Invincible Overlord.

A cumulative sales listing shows that City State of the Invincible Overlord sold over 40,000 units by 1981.

City State of the Invincible Overlord launched Judges Guild as a company, and was the centerpiece of Wilderlands of High Fantasy, the first licensed and published Dungeons & Dragons campaign setting.

After ceasing publication, Judges Guild licensed a City State of the Invincible Overlord line to Mayfair Games from 1987 to 1989.

Bob Bledsaw led Judges Guild back to the internet in early 1999 to sell Judges Guild products that had been long warehoused, including a new printing of City State of the Invincible Overlord (1999).

Judges Guild announced a partnership with Necromancer Games in June 2002, who began releasing products by Judges Guild in 2003, including large collectors' editions of City State of the Invincible Overlord (2004) and Wilderlands of High Fantasy (2005).

=== Editions ===
The City-State has gone through several editions:

- Judges Guild: Campaign Installment I (1976), 16-page booklet (D&D)
- Judges Guild: Guide to the City State (1977), 56-page booklet (D&D)
- Judges Guild: Revised City State of the Invincible Overlord (1978–1980, three printings), 80-page book.(D&D)
- Judges Guild: Revised City State of the Invincible Overlord (1981–1983, three printings), 96-page book. (1983 edition had "Approved for use with D&D" removed from cover)
- Mayfair Games: Revised City State of the Invincible Overlord (1987) and published a supplement, Calandia Guidebook in 1989.
- Judges Guild: Reprinted edition of 1981-83 edition of Revised City State of the Invincible Overlord (1999), 96-page book (D&D)
- Necromancer Games: City State of the Invincible Overlord (2004), 288-page hardcover book (revised d20)

== Contents ==
The City State of the Invincible Overlord setting presented a single city, the dwarven fortress and town of Thunderhold, designed to be both as a base for campaigning, as well as a seed for city-based adventures. A second product, Wraith Overlord, explored the city's subterranean cellars, sewers and catacombs.

The Judges Guild editions published from 1976 to 1983 contained an overview of the city, and contained a large 34" x 44" four-page map of the town. Other resources in the book included descriptions of notable inhabitants of the town, a table of random encounters, and a list of rumors that the gamemaster could incorporate into the game.

The Mayfair Games edition (1987) came as a boxed set that included a four-page introduction, an 80-page Map & Population book, a 32-page Background & Encounter book, a large full-color map with the city on the front and an island campaign setting on the reverse, a large Players' Map, a 16-page adventure book, four 8-page Race Guides, and two plastic overlay sheets for city and wilderness travel.

The Necromancer Games edition (2004) was a reprint of the 1983 edition with an updated booty list.

== Reception ==
In the October-November 1977 edition of White Dwarf (Issue #3), Don Turnbull gave a thumbs up to the 1977 Judges Guild edition, saying, "The result is something of a triumph, a labour of love (and considerable headache) for the designer and coordinator. It should be welcome in any fantasy gamer's collection."

Patrick Amory reviewed City State of the Invincible Overlord for Different Worlds magazine and stated that "the City-State generally deserves the praise it gets and is well-worth the money".

In the August 1988 edition of Dragon (Issue #136), Jim Bambra was impressed with the production values of the 1987 Mayfair edition, calling it "an impressive looking package." Bambra was disappointed by the contents compared to the original Judges Guild editions, saying, "Gone are the winding alleys and jumbled buildings, now replaced by a pretty but unconvincing suburban playground. Buildings stand in their own spacious grounds, making the city look like nothing more than a sprawling village enclosed by stout stone walls. No longer are there alleys to get mugged in after dark. Gone are the overcrowded streets. This city is a town-planner’s dream. As such, it is hardly the stuff of a bustling fantasy city." He did enjoy the Background & Encounter Book, which he found to be "vibrant and exciting", but found that "As it stands, the city exists on its own, with its background seemingly tacked on as an afterthought." He concluded with a firm thumbs down, saying, "The revised City-State of the Invincible Overlord set is a good example of how not to go about designing a city. It lacks a cohesive feel, and any atmosphere the City-State may have had is lost in a mass of individual location descriptions. Ten years ago, this would have been acceptable; today, it's lackluster and boring. Instead of rectifying the faults of the original, Mayfair has amplified them."

In the October 1988 issue of Games International, game designer Ian Marsh called the original publication "typical of the products of the time ... Role-players, however, have become more advanced since then, and the charming simplicity of the original City-State of the Invincible Overlord is no longer stimulating enough for rewarding games play." However, Marsh was not pleased with the new Mayfair edition, saying that it "offers very little that is new, but without having the same character as the original ... It suffers from the same problem that afflicted its predecessor, one which is vital to solve if the encounters are to be different from simple fights: it lacks detail." Marsh also felt that the many tables that provided random monsters "that for some reason pop up in a back alley" was not enough to build an adventure with. "Characters in a city need adventures that embroil them in the running of that city, at whatever level they are suited to be at. This is where City State's detailing could be improved." Marsh concluded, "The information that the referee is provided with isn't helpful and will require some tinkering to make the characters fit in with his own world, if he has one, or will just seem odd in terms of the City State campaign."

Writing about the same time in Issue 9 of the games magazine Gateways, Patricia Travis concurred with Marsh, commenting about the Mayfair edition, "sadly, the city seems to have shrunk since I first took a team through it ... Entire neighborhoods have been wiped out, including the old temple district. The twisted and strange layout of the hundreds of streets in the old edition have given way to an orderly arrangement of attractive buildings ... The 'new' City-State is less than one half the size of the old one, and that loss is what makes it difficult to accept it as a revision." Travis concluded, "Mayfair has taken a huge and complex gaming city and edited it down to a manageable, somewhat bland town. It is neater, cleaner, graphically pleasing, and easier to negotiate. But it has lost the mystery, the sheer impressiveness, and the magic of the old."

In his 1990 book The Complete Guide to Role-Playing Games, game designer Rick Swan noted, "The problems with City State are common to all generic supplements; namely, it takes a fair amount of work from the referee to adapt the material to a specific game system, and there are some obvious continuity problems when abruptly dropping a setting this detailed into an existing campaign world." Nonetheless, Swan concluded with a positive recommendation, saying, "for referees in the market for this type of generic material, City State of the Invincible Overlord is a great buy".

In his 2023 book Monsters, Aliens, and Holes in the Ground, RPG historian Stu Horvath noted, "the emphasis of the material is on making the city-state fun and interesting. Plausibility is never a consideration, and that's the source of much of the charm ... The intricate presentation of the city is unprecedented for the time."
