= Dana Lombardy =

- Occupation: Game designer

Dana Lombardy is a game designer who has worked primarily on board games.

== Career ==
Dana Lombardy designed the award-winning Streets of Stalingrad board wargame, published in 1979 with three separate editions since its first release. He is also known for his appearances on various television shows, including multiple episodes of the History Channel's Tales of the Gun. Lombardy has contributed as an editor, cartographer, graphic artist, and designer to many books, games, and magazines. For some board games such as 4th Reich, he served as both designer and graphic artist. He served as publisher of Napoleon Journal from 1996 to 2000.

Lombardy contributed the "On Gaming" column to Analog Science Fiction and Fact from January 1983 to April 1986; this was simultaneous with his contributing the "Gaming" column to Asimov's Science Fiction from January 1983 to April 1986, both of which were then continued by Matthew Costello.
