= Ace of Aces (picture book game) =

Aerial combat picture book game

- Cover of 1st edition showing typical illustration from picture book
- Designers: Alfred Leonardi
- Publishers: Gameshop/Nova Game Designs
- Publication: 1980
- Genres: WWI aerial combat

Ace of Aces is a two-player combat picture book game designed by Alfred Leonardi and first published in 1980 by Gameshop (later Nova Game Designs).

== Gameplay ==
Each set includes a pair of small books, one for each player (generally marked 'German' and 'Allied'). These are like gamebooks in that instead of reading through them, a person is 'at' one particular page, and the book represents a World War I fighter. Each player turns to the same page number in his book; the illustration on that page shows the view from the cockpit of his airplane, looking at the opponent. Along the bottom of the page is a series of maneuvers that can be performed, with page numbers listed under them (while the page numbers are different with each page, the maneuvers are constant).

Each player selects a maneuver. Both players then announce the corresponding numbers. Each player turns to the page number announced by the opponent, looks up his own maneuver there, and turns to the page number listed under it. After both players have done this, they are on the same (new) page, looking at new views of each other. The process is repeated until one player has maneuvered his opponent into the sights of his guns and can shoot him down.

The maneuvers in both books are the same, with each set representing a range of aircraft with similar handling characteristics. Different sets are completely compatible with each other and can be used together, as long as opposing books are selected.

The maneuvers map onto a hex board, meaning that players were able to use figures on such a board to represent their current positions relative to each other.

Additionally, a single player can in essence "fly solo" by picking up a single book and executing maneuvers. The result is not unlike using the aircraft pictured in the book's pages as a fixed, non-moving spatial reference point. This provides a way for newcomers to the game to get a feel for what each maneuver does, and hence a reasonably quick way to get up to a competitive level of play against opponents.

Gameplay could further be customized by using an included sheet of rules which provided for "intermediate" and "advanced" games. These games added factors such as altitude difference, ammunition supply, wind speed, and jammed guns to the basic game (which assumed the guns always worked and had an endless supply of ammunition, and that the players would fly at the same altitude throughout in still air).

The game was popular and simple to learn, and it could be played anywhere as no table is required.

== Expansions ==
- Handy Rotary Series (1980)
- Powerhouse Series (1981)
- Flying Machines (1983)
- Balloon Buster (1985)
- Handy Rotary Deluxe Edition (1986)
- Wingleader (1988)
- Jet Eagles (1990)

== Other games ==
Ace of Aces was the first of its type creating a new genre of gaming. Bounty Hunter used much the same format for an old west gunfight (only one set was released, Shootout at the Saloon). Dragonriders of Pern used the Ace of Aces format in a contest to stop Threadfall. Alfred Leonardi designed the Lost Worlds combat book game system which is sometimes mistakenly described as using the Ace of Aces system. Joe Dever used this style for his Combat Heroes fantasy setting books.

In 1989, West End Games released a set of books with the title Starfighter Battle Book: X-wing vs. TIE Interceptor, using the Ace of Aces format; even the shooting pages are the same.

== Reception ==
In Issue 47 of the British wargaming magazine Perfidious Albion, Charles Vasey called this, "a really innovative system that shows just how far our air wargames have got to go to be anything like pilot role-players ... the vast number of possible permutations make this a great advance over board-games." Vasey concluded, "Fast, demanding and skillful, its high price (it will be over £10) is, for once, reasonable."

Nick Schuessler reviewed Ace of Aces in The Space Gamer No. 45. Schuessler commented that "enjoy trying to figure out how this little paper computer always gets you back to the same page with the right pictures showing."

In Issue 34 of Phoenix, D. Aldridge noted the relatively high cost of the game in the UK – nearly £10 – but admitted: "you do get a greater sense of involvement than you do from shoving counters around a board." He concluded that the game was worth the price, saying, "the game plays quickly, can be taught to anyone in a couple of minutes in the basic version, and it does seem to impart something of the feel of WWI aerial combat."

In 1999, Pyramid magazine named Ace of Aces as one of the "Millennium's Best Games". According to that magazine the game is "nothing more than a hex-based single-unit wargame, [but] what made Ace of Aces great was the presentation. By completely hiding the actual mechanics of the game in the flipbooks, it didn't feel like a wargame."

== Reviews ==
- Adventure Gaming #2

== Awards ==
- At the 1981 Origins Awards, Ace of Aces won the Charles S. Roberts Award for "Gamers Choice of 1980".
- At the 1993 Origins Awards, Ace of Aces was inducted into the Product Hall of Fame.

== Reprint project ==
The game is long out of print, but in June 2012 a Kickstarter project was initiated to reprint the game, with the permission and cooperation of the game's designer. The project was successful and the game was republished in January 2014.

In February 2024 a successful Kickstarter project to update the graphics and release a new set of books was launched. (Sadly, on July 14 2025 the Kickstarter project team passed along the news that Alfred Leonardi had died .)
