= Dragon Rage (board game) =

Fantasy board game

Dragon Rage is a 1982 board game published by Heritage/Dwarfstar.

== Gameplay ==
Dragon Rage is a game in which monsters such as Dragons, Giants, Goblins and Orcs seek revenge against a walled city for their destruction of Dragon eggs.

== Reception ==
Matthew J. Costello reviewed Dragon Rage in The Space Gamer No. 63. Costello commented that "Dragon Rage is a worthwhile game. to some extent, I felt like I was playing out a tactical skirmish from Chaosium's Dragon Pass, Rage is an intriguing game, drawing you back for another go and it's a quick setup. One can only bemoan the passing of Heritage and the Dwarfstar line of games."
