= Encyclopedia Hârnica =

1980s monthly fantasy RPG game supplement

Encyclopedia Hârnica was a monthly periodical that was published by Columbia Games in 1984–1985 on a subscription basis to supplement the fantasy game world of Hârn and its associated role-playing game, HârnMaster.

== Description ==
First issue, 1984

Encyclopedia Hârnica is a series of sixteen booklets that provides supplemental information about the Hârn game world.

Each issue covers a variety of topics:

1. The city of Adzamere; Lake Arain and the Kingdom of Azadmere; The history, culture, religion and economics of the Khudzul
2. The ruins of Anisha; The Tashal region in the Kingdom of Kaldor; Harnic codes, crimes, and punishments
3. The Royal Castle of Olokand and the Olokand region in the Kingdom of Kaldor; Manorial economics and fief management
4. Trobridge Inn; Hutop region in the Kingdom of Kaldor; A gamemaster’s guide to the galaxy
5. The ruined city of Lothrim; Gardiren region in the Kingdom of Kaldor; A comprehensive list of Harnic prices
6. Kiban region in the Kingdom of Kaldor; The enigmatic Godstones
7. A star gazers' guide to the heavens; Qualdris region in the Kingdom of Kaldor; The rules of Lythian Armor
8. History, politics and clans of Kaldor; Minarsas region in the Kingdom of Kaldor; Prophesy and destiny in the night sky
9. Ancient Sindarin fortress and prison of Bejist; Plants and potions, formulas and uses; The cruel and unpredictable Pagaelen people
10. The Royal Castle of Burzyn; Chybisa: History, politics and clans
11. The enigmatic Earthmaster site of Telumar; Ilme, meredragons of Limen Marsh; The shy and secretive Bujoc people
12. The elven port of Ulfshaven; Eleshavel, the hidden heart of the elven kingdom; Sindarin, the immortal elves of the Shava Forest
13. The Viking Kingdom of Orbaal; Geldeheim, the Royal Castle of Orbaal
14. Noron's Keep; Gedan, the Lodge of a Thousand Souls; The Anoa, nomadic barbarians of the Anoth Valley; The Taelda, forest dwellers of Nuthela
15. Leriel, Jarin Castle in Southwestern Orbaal; The human Jarin, their culture and history; The Ymodi, wild hillmen of Himod; The Yelgri, Harnic Harpies
16. Zerhun, Khuzdul Castle in the Kingdom of Azadmere; Habe, Jarin Keep in the Kingdom of Azadmere

== Publication history ==
Each new Encyclopedia Hârnica booklet appeared monthly beginning in 1984. Each was usually 24 pages, although Issue #10 was 20 pages. Publication ended in 1985 after Issue #16.

In Spring 1987, Columbia Games began publication of a similar journal, Hârnlore. This periodical was published quarterly in 1987 and 1988, twice in 1990, and twice in 1992, ceasing publication after Issue #11.

== Reception ==
Steve Jackson reviewed Encyclopedia Hârnica for Fantasy Gamer magazine and stated that "If you liked the original Harn, you will probably want these supplements, Otherwise, otherwise."

In the August 1984 edition of White Dwarf (Issue #56), Simon Farrell noted that in the first three issues of Encyclopedia Hârnica, the editors invited feedback and ideas for future articles from subscribers; Farrell speculated that, given the monthly nature of the periodical, if this feedback was quickly used to create articles for a four-week turnaround, "we can expect to see a decline in quality as time goes on."

In the May-June 1985 edition of Space Gamer (No. 74), Allen Varney reviewed issues #3-11 and gave a thumbs up to Encyclopedia Hârnica, saying, "The detail is copious, the range impressive – not to say forbidding."

In the March 1986 edition of Dragon (Issue 107), Eric W. Pass said the periodical contained "An excellent variety of useful articles." He especially admired the "solid game-playing topics" on Harnic laws, manor economics, Harnic astrology and herb lore.

In Issue 38 of Abyss, Eric Olson liked the featured articles of each issue, especially the "Atlas Harnica", but noted that it "was not without flaws." He thought the overall price of the yearly subscription ($60) was too high. He also thought many of the regional maps would not be of use to the average gamemaster. Despite this Olson concluded, "All things considered, Encyclopedia Harnica is definitely worth looking into, although I would recommend that those of you who don't own World of Harn pick and choose issues, as they are expensive if you aren't planning to use the whole background."
