= Phoenix Games =

American role playing game publisher

Phoenix Games was an American game company that produced role-playing games and game supplements.

== History ==
Phoenix Games was located in Rockville, Maryland. Phoenix Games began as a partnership between Dan Bress and Phil Edgren, and was a successor to the company Little Soldier Games, to which Bress and Edgren had both contributed before that company closed. Ed Konstant of Little Soldier Games designed some products for Phoenix Games, such as The Book of Fantasy Miniatures (1978) and the deduction game Elementary Watson (1978) which was financed by Gamescience in exchange for rights to the back catalog for Little Soldier Games. A few transitional supplements were published between the companies, such as The Book of Shamans (1978) using the Little Soldier Games label, as a division of Phoenix Games. Phoenix Games continued publishing the fantasy role-playing game supplements that Little Soldier Games had started, and expanded into science-fiction role-playing game supplements. Phoenix Games published the first role-playing game work by Kerry Lloyd, the fantasy adventure The Mines of Keridav (1979). Phoenix Games also published the fantasy role-playing game supplements The Book of Shamans by Ed Lipsett and The Book of Treasure by Phil Edgren in 1978, and the fantasy adventure The Lost Abbey of Calthonwey by R. Norman Carter in 1979. Phoenix Games also published Ed Lipsett's series of science-fiction role-playing game supplements Spacefarer's Guide to Planets: Sector One (1978), Spacefarer's Guide to Planets: Sector Two (1979), Spacefarer's Guide to Alien Monsters (1979), and Spacefarer's Guide to Alien Races (1979). These supplements by Lipsett led to his Star Quest (1983) game, the first non-licensed original tabletop role-playing game published in Japan.

The second edition of the role-playing game Bushido was published by Phoenix Games in 1980; Phoenix Games was also preparing to publish Paul Hume and Bob Charrette's Aftermath! (1981), but as the company went defunct, Fantasy Games Unlimited reprinted Bushido in 1981, and stickered their logo over the Phoenix Games logo on the boxes for Aftermath!.

Phoenix Games had a booth at GenCon XII in 1979 to sell their science fiction and fantasy RPG products as well as create interest in their upcoming game Streets of Stalingrad, with a columnist from Dragon stating noting the game "purports to be 12 separate games in one, which would make the seemingly steep price much more reasonable". Dana Lombardy's Streets of Stalingrad by Phoenix Games won the 1980 Charles S. Roberts Award for Best Initial Release Wargame. In the February 1981 issue of Dragon, another columnist noted that Phoenix Games "invested a very great deal in its massive Dana Lombardy-John Hill design Streets of Stalingrad", sparking rumors that the company would go out of business. Game reviewer Ian Chadwick called it "one of the most impressive games the industry has ever produced", noting that Streets of Stalingrad would quickly be unavailable at stores because the game suffered from low financing and the closing of "the short-lived Phoenix Games". Phoenix Games was one of the companies that freelance game designer Perry Moore sold his designs to, but the company went out of business after releasing Streets of Stalingrad, and before they were able to print any of the designs from Perry. Kerry Lloyd wrote a sequel to The Mines of Keridav called The Demon Pits of Caeldo, but Phoenix Games went out of business before it could be published, so Lloyd started the gaming company Gamelords.

Megalomania was voted 3rd place at the Crash Readers' Awards 1987 in the category "Best EPM game".
