= Streets of Stalingrad =

1979 WWII board game

- Box cover of original 1979 edition
- Designers: Dana Lombardy
- Publishers: Phoenix Games
- Publication: 1979

Streets of Stalingrad is a 1979 board wargame published by Phoenix Games that simulates World War II urban combat during the Battle of Stalingrad.

== Background ==
At the start Germany's invasion of the Soviet Union, Operation Barbarossa, Stalingrad (now Volgograd) was the largest industrial center of the Soviet Union and an important transport hub on the Volga River; controlling Stalingrad meant gaining access to the oil fields of the Caucasus and having supreme authority over the Volga River. The city was therefore one of Germany's key objectives, and one that the Soviet Union could not afford to lose.

== Gameplay ==
Streets of Stalingrad is a game for two players, one of whom takes control of German forces, while the other controls Soviet forces. The scale of the game is tactical platoon, simulating building-to-building fighting in the streets of Stalingrad in late 1942. The game comes with twelve scenarios and two large hex grid maps that cover the city of Stalingrad.

Cover of 3rd edition with artwork by Rodger B. MacGowan

== Publication history ==
Dana Lombardy designed Streets of Stalingrad, which was published in 1979 by Phoenix Games. It was republished as a free pull-out game in the September–October 1980 issue of Fire & Movement.

In 1982, Lombardy revised the game, which was released by Nova Game Designs as Battle for the Factories. In 2003, Art Lupinacci again revised the game, which was published by L2 Design Group as Streets of Stalingrad, Third Edition with cover art by Rodger B. MacGowan.

== Reception ==
In Issue 47 of the British wargaming magazine Perfidious Albion, Charles Vasey remarked, "The rules are not difficult, being upgraded Battle for Hue onto which all that detail can be grafted." Vasey concluded by warning, "physically impressive, lots of consideration in the aids used, but not the game for the tyro."

Nick Schuessler reviewed Streets of Stalingrad in The Space Gamer No. 28. Schuessler commented that "city fighting has never been done that well. SOS is no worse than previous efforts, and should get marks for a good try."

== Awards ==
At the 1980 Charles S. Roberts Awards, Streets of Stalingrad won in the category of "Best Initial Release".

== Other reviews and commentary ==
- Strategy & Tactics #80
- Casus Belli #4 (June 1981)
- Perfidious Albion #48 (October 1980) p.10-12
