= Star Viking =

Board game

Star Viking is a 1981 board game published by Heritage Models.

== Gameplay ==
Star Viking is a game in which one player controls the Federate force tasked with protecting a cluster of star systems, while the other player is the Star Vikings looking to raid the provinces.

== Reception ==
Steve Jackson reviewed Star Viking in The Space Gamer No. 46. Jackson commented that "I give Star Viking an qualified recommendation. It would almost be worth the price foe the maps and counters alone! If you like the idea of plunder in outer space, you should probably pick this game up... but you may want to rewrite a lot of the rules to suit yourself. If Heritage had to 'borrow' so heavily from H. Beam Piper's [Space Viking], it's too bad they couldn't have done it justice."

Steve List reviewed Star Viking in Ares Magazine #12 and commented that "Star Viking as a game approaches Imperium (to which it bears a resemblance) in excellent as a game of strategic space opera."

== Reviews ==
- Dragon #57
