= Lewis Pulsipher =

American game designer

- Occupations: Game designer, author, retired college instructor
- Writing career
- Period: 1969 to 1983, 2004 to the Present
- Notable work: Britannia
- Website: pulsiphergames.com

Lewis Errol Pulsipher, often credited as Lew Pulsipher, is an American teacher, game designer, and author, whose subject is role-playing games, board games, card games, and video games. He has designed half a dozen published board games, written more than 150 articles about games, contributed to several books about games, and presented at game conventions and conferences.

== Early life ==
Pulsipher graduated from Albion College in 1973, and earned a Ph.D. in military and diplomatic history from Duke University (1981). He discovered strategic gaming with early Avalon Hill wargames. In college, he designed many Diplomacy variants.

== Career ==
While living in England in the late 1970s, he wrote magazine articles about Dungeons & Dragons (D&D), and other role-playing games. At one time or another, he was a contributing editor to Dragon, White Dwarf, and The Space Gamer as well as a columnist for Imagine. He also contributed monsters to TSR's original Fiend Folio, including the Elemental Princes of Evil, giant bat, denzelian, and poltergeist.He published what may have been the first science fiction and fantasy game magazine, Supernova (later sold to Flying Buffalo Inc.), as well as other non-commercial magazines. He made presentations at game conventions as early as Origins 82.

He also designed several games published mostly in the 1980s. He is the designer of Dragon Rage, Valley of the Four Winds, and Swords & Wizardry. His game Britannia, was described in an Armchair General review as "one of the great titles in the world of games", and is the progenitor of a series of similar games. He received the 1987 Charles S. Roberts Award Nomination, Best Pre-World War II Boardgame, Britannia for this game.

He taught college-level computer networking, Web development, and game design in North Carolina. He was the first person in the North Carolina Community College System to teach game design classes, in fall 2004. Pulsipher now teaches video game related subjects online through Udemy, writes for Game Developer and GameCareerGuide, and continues to design board and card games.

== Selected bibliography ==
=== Games ===
- Pulsipher, Lewis (1978), Diplomacy Games and Variants, Strategy Games LTD
- Swords & Wizardry, Gibsons Games, 1980
- Valley of the Four Winds, Games Workshop, 1980
- Dragon Rage, Dwarfstar Games, 1980 (not to be confused with the PlayStation 2 game Dragon Rage). The title is back in print by Flatlined Games since 2011.
- Britannia, Gibsons Games, 1986. Later editions in the USA (1987), Germany (1991); revised version USA (2006), France, Germany, Spain, and Hungary (2008)
- Sea Kings, Worthington Publishing, 2015
- Stalingrad Besieged, Worthington Publishing, 2019

=== Video games ===
- Lew Pulsipher's Doomstar, Large Visible Machine, 2016, Steam

==== Book ====
- Game Design: How to Create Video and Tabletop Games, Start to Finish. McFarland & Co., Publishers. 2012. ISBN 978-0-7864-6952-9.

=== Articles and book contributions ===
- Dragon (various articles)
- White Dwarf (various articles)
- The General Magazine (various articles)
- Pulsipher, Lewis (2007). "Stalingrad". In Lowder, James (ed.). Hobby Games: The 100 Best. Green Ronin Publishing. ISBN 978-1-932442-96-0.
- Pulsipher, Lewis (2007). "Blokus". In Lowder, James (ed.). Hobby Games: The 100 Best. Green Ronin Publishing. ISBN 978-1-932442-96-0.
- Pulsipher, Lewis (2010). "The Three-Player Problem". Tabletop Game Design. ETC Press. (Forthcoming)
