= Kerry Lloyd =

American role-playing game designer

- Born: September 29, 1941
- Died: August 27, 1988 (aged 46)
- Occupation: Game designer

Kerry David Miles Lloyd (September 29, 1941 – August 27, 1988) was a game designer who worked primarily on role-playing games.

== Career ==
Kerry Lloyd wrote his first published work, the fantasy role-playing game adventure The Mines of Keridav (1979), which was published through Maryland game company Phoenix Games. Phoenix Games went out of business before publishing the sequel The Demon Pits of Caeldo, so Lloyd formed the game company Gamelords in Gaithersburg, Maryland with friends Richard Meyer, Janet Trautvetter, and Michael Watkins. Lloyd co-designed the role-playing game Thieves' Guild with Meyer and Watkins, which was published in 1980 by Gamelords. Gamelords reprinted The Mines of Keridav in 1983 and finally published The Demon Pits of Caeldo in that same year as well.

Kerry Lloyd died on August 27, 1988.
