= List of Avalon Hill games =

Avalon Hill has published games as an independent developer and publisher, through its subsidiary Victory Games, its video game divisions, and later as a brand of Hasbro.

== Original Avalon Hill ==
Some of these were originally developed independently and repackaged/republished by Avalon Hill. The games came in two formats: the earlier games were traditional flat-box packaging, and a later series introduced bookcase compact format packaging.

| Name | Year | Notes |
|---|---|---|
| 1776 | 1974 | American Revolution |
| 1830 | 1986 | |
| 1914 | 1968 | World War I |
| Acquire | 1976 | formerly published by 3M;^{p5,12} republished by Hasbro/WOTC's AH |
| Adel Verpflichtet | 1991 | |
| Advanced Squad Leader | 1985 | Follow-on game to Squad Leader; republished by Multi-Man Publishing |
| Advanced Third Reich | 1992 | |
| Afrika Korps | 1964, 1965, 1977 | |
| Age of Renaissance | 1996 | later published by Eurogames/Jeux Descartes |
| Air Assault on Crete | 1978 | |
| Air Baron | 1996 | |
| Air Empire | 1961 | |
| Air Force | 1980 | First published by Battleline Publications in 1976 |
| Alexander the Great | 1975 | First published in 1971 by Guidon Games |
| Alpha Omega | 1980 | First published by Battleline Publications in 1977 |
| Amoeba Wars | 1981 | |
| Anzio | 1969, 1971, 1974, 1978 | |
| Arab-Israeli Wars | 1977 | |
| Assassin | 1993 | |
| Atlantic Storm | 1997 | |
| Attack Sub | 1991 | |
| B-17, Queen of the Skies | 1983 | |
| Bali | 1980 | |
| Banzai | 1984 | An Up Front expansion |
| Baseball Strategy | 1962 | privately published by Tom Shaw in 1959^{7} |
| Basketball Strategy | 1973 | |
| Battle for Italy | 1983 | |
| Battle of the Bulge | 1965, 1991 | |
| Beat Inflation | 1975 | |
| Bismarck | 1962, 1979 | Sinking of the Bismarck |
| Bitter Woods: the Battle of the Bulge | 1998 | |
| Black Spy | 1981 | |
| Blackbeard | 1991 | |
| Blitzkrieg | 1965 | |
| Book of Lists | 1979 | |
| Bowl Bound | 1978 | College football |
| Breakout: Normandy | 1993 | |
| Britannia | 1986 | First published by Gibsons Games |
| Bureaucracy | 1981 | |
| Business Strategy | 1973 | |
| C&O/B&O | 1969 | "The Game of Railroading" |
| Caesar | 1976 | Caesar at Alesia |
| Caesar's Legions | 1975 | |
| Candidate | 1991 | |
| Chancellorsville | 1961, 1974 | A war game simulating the battle of Chancellorsville in the American Civil War. |
| Challenge Golf at Pebble Beach | 1976 | formerly published by 3M |
| Circus Maximus | 1980 | Chariot racing in the spirit of Ben Hur |
| Civil War | 1961 | |
| Civilization | 1982 | |
| Advanced Civilization | 1991 | |
| Class Struggle | 1982 | |
| Clear for Action | 1984 | |
| The Collector | 1977 | |
| Conquistador | 1983 | First published by SPI in 1976 |
| D-Day | 1961, 1965, 1971, 1977, 1991 | |
| Dark Emperor | 1985 | |
| Devil's Den | 1985 | |
| Diplomacy | 1961, 1977 | First published by Games Research in 1961 |
| Dispatcher | 1958 | A game simulating the challenges of running trains on a railroad. |
| Doll House Game | 1963 | |
| Down With the King | 1981 | |
| The Dr. Ruth Game of Good Sex | 1985 | A Baltimore distributor said: "I'm going to have to compare this to Trivial Pursuit. The orders overshadow anything we've had in our company's 100-year history." |
| Dragon Pass | 1984 | Under Chaosium licence, who first published the game in 1975 under the title White Bear and Red Moon |
| Dragonhunt | 1982 | |
| Dune | 1979 | |
| Dauntless | 1981 | formerly Battleline; uses Air Force game system |
| Elric | 1984 | Under Chaosium license, who first published the game in 1978 |
| Empire of the Rising Sun | 1995 | |
| Empires in Arms | 1986 | First published by Australian Design Group in 1983 |
| Enemy in Sight | 1981 | |
| Executive Decision | 1981 | formerly published by 3M |
| Facts in Five | 1976 | formerly published by 3M |
| Feudal | 1976 | formerly published by 3M |
| Firepower | 1984 | |
| Flat Top | 1981 | First published by Battleline in 1977 |
| Flight Leader | 1986 | |
| Football Strategy | 1960 | privately published by Tom Shaw in 1959^{7} |
| Foreign Exchange | 1979 | |
| Fortress Europa | 1980 | First published by Jedko Games in 1978 |
| Frederick the Great | 1982 | First published by SPI in 1975 |
| Fredericksburg | 1982 | A war game simulating the battle of Fredericksburg in the American Civil War. |
| Freedom in the Galaxy | 1981 | Originally published by SPI |
| Fury in the West | 1979 | First published by Battleline Publications in 1977 |
| The Game of Dilemmas | 1982 | |
| The Game of France, 1940 | 1972 | First published by SPI in 1971 |
| The Game of Inventions | 1984 | |
| Game of Slang | 1981 | |
| Game of Trivia | 1981 | |
| Gangsters | 1992 | |
| Guerilla | 1994 | |
| Geronimo | 1995 | |
| Gettysburg | 1958, 1961, 1964, 1977, 1988, 1989 | The 1958 Gettysburg was Avalon Hill's first game to market (not Tactics or Tactics II). |
| Gladiator | 1981 | |
| Gold! | 1981 | |
| Greed | 1986 | |
| Guadalcanal | 1966 | Land Combat |
| Guadalcanal | 1992 | Naval Combat |
| Guns of August | 1981 | |
| Gunslinger | 1983 | |
| Hannibal: Rome vs. Carthage | 1996 | |
| Hexagony | 1980 | |
| History of the World | 1993 | |
| Hitler's War | 1984 | First published by Metagaming Concepts in 1981 |
| Hundred Days Battles | 1983 | |
| IDF (Israeli Defense Force) | 1993 | |
| Image | 1979 | |
| Imagination | 1963 | pre-school children's line, revised in 1969^{p7} |
| Insolvency | 1990 | |
| Intern | 1979 | |
| Journeys of St. Paul | 1968 | |
| Jutland | 1967, 1974 | |
| Kampfgruppe Peiper I | 1993 | ASL historical module |
| Kampfgruppe Peiper II | 1996 | ASL historical module |
| Kingmaker | 1974 | |
| Knights of the Air | 1987 | |
| Kremlin | 1988 | |
| Kriegspiel | 1970 | |
| Le Mans | 1961 | |
| Legend of Robin Hood | 1980 | First published by Operational Studies Group in 1979 |
| Little Round Top | 1982 | First published as The 20th Maine by Operational Studies Group in 1979 |
| London's Burning | 1996 | |
| The Longest Day | 1980 | |
| Lords of Creation | 1983 | Role-playing game |
| Luftwaffe | 1971 | |
| Machiavelli | 1980 | |
| Management | 1961 | |
| Magic Realm | 1978 | |
| Maharaja | 1994 | |
| MBT | 1989 | |
| Merchant of Venus | 1988 | |
| Midway | 1964, 1991 | 2 player game of the Battle of Midway; 1964 version uses squares; 1991 version uses hexes. |
| Monsters Ravage America | 1998 | |
| Moonstar | 1981 | |
| Mustangs | 1991 | |
| Mystic Wood | 1980 | licensed from designer & published in UK by Gibson Games and Ariel |
| | Napoleon | 1977 |
| Napoleon at Bay | 1983 | |
| Napoleon's Battles | 1989 | |
| Naval War | 1983 | First published by Battleline in 1979 |
| New World | 1990 | |
| Nieuchess | 1961 | |
| OD | 1985 | |
| Oh Wah Ree | 1976 | formerly published by 3M |
| On To Richmond | 1998 | |
| Origins of World War II | 1971 | |
| Outdoor Survival | 1972 | |
| Panzer Armee Afrika | 1982 | First published by SPI in 1973 |
| PanzerBlitz | 1970 | |
| Panzergruppe Guderian | 1984 | First published by SPI in 1976 |
| Panzerkrieg | 1983 | Originally published by OSG |
| Panzer Leader | 1974 | |
| Past Lives | 1988 | |
| Patton's Best | 1987 | |
| Paydirt | 1979 | American football |
| Pennant Race | 1983 | Baseball |
| Perilous Lands | 1985 | A Powers & Perils adventure, published as a BookCase Game |
| The Peter Principle | 1981 | |
| Platoon | 1986 | |
| Pogs | 1995 | public domain |
| Point of Law | 1979 | formerly published by 3M |
| Powers & Perils | 1983 | Role-playing game |
| Pro Golf | 1982 | |
| Raid on St. Nazaire | 1987 | |
| Rail Baron | 1977 | |
| Regatta | 1979 | formerly published by 3M |
| Republic of Rome | 1990 | |
| Richthofen's War | 1972 | World War I aerial combat |
| Risque | 1985 | |
| Road Kill | 1993 | |
| Roads to Gettysburg | 1994 | |
| RuneQuest | 1984 | roleplaying game, 3rd Edition under license from Chaosium |
| The Russian Campaign | 1977 | First published by Jedko Games in 1974 |
| Russian Front | 1985 | |
| Samurai | 1980 | |
| Shakespeare | 1970 | |
| Slapshot | 1982 | An ice hockey board game |
| Sleuth | 1981 | formerly published by 3M |
| Source of the Nile | 1979 | African exploration |
| Speed Circuit | 1971, 1977 | formerly published by 3M |
| Spices of the World | 1988 | |
| Squad Leader | 1977 | WWII tactical combat |
| Cross of Iron | 1978 | Squad Leader Module |
| Crescendo of Doom | 1979 | Squad Leader Module |
| GI: Anvil of Victory | 1982 | Squad Leader Module |
| Squander | 1965 | |
| Stalingrad | 1963, 1974 | |
| Starship Troopers | 1976, 1997 | |
| Statis Pro Baseball | 1978 | Updated player cards each year until 1992 |
| Statis Pro Basketball | 1978 | Updated player cards each year until 1992 |
| Statis Pro Football | 1978 | Updated player cards each year until 1992 |
| Stellar Conquest | 1984 | From Metagaming Concepts |
| Stocks and Bonds | 1978 | formerly published by 3M |
| Stock Market | 1970 | |
| Stock Market Guru | 1997 | |
| Stonewall Jackson's Way | 1992 | |
| Stonewall in the Valley | 1995 | |
| Stonewall's Last Battle | 1996 | |
| Storm Over Arnhem | 1981 | |
| Struggle of Nations | 1982 | |
| Submarine | 1978 | First published by Battleline Publications in 1976 |
| Successors | 1997 | |
| Superstar Baseball | 1978 | |
| Tac Air | 1988 | NATO vs. Warsaw Pact Air/Land doctrine |
| Tactics | 1952, 1983 | 1952 version was published by "The Avalon Game Company" (1952-1958), an unincorporated garage mail-order business that was incorporated as Avalon Hill in 1958 |
| Tactics II | 1958, 1961, 1972 | |
| Tales from the Floating Vagabond | 1991 | Role playing |
| Third Reich | 1974, 1981 | WWII grand strategy |
| Advanced Third Reich | 1992 | |
| Thunder at Cassino | 1987 | |
| Titan | 1982 | Fantasy monster combat |
| Titan: the Arena | 1997 | |
| Tobruk | 1975 | |
| Tower of the Dead | 1984 | A Powers & Perils adventure |
| Trireme | 1979 | First published by Decalset in 1971 and Battleline Publications in 1978 |
| Trucks, Trains, Boats & Planes | 1963 | pre-school children's line^{p7} |
| Tuf | 1969 | |
| Tuf*Abet | 1969 | |
| Turning Point: Stalingrad | 1989 | Area movement simulation of the Battle of Stalingrad. |
| TV Wars | 1987 | |
| TwixT | 1976 | formerly published by 3M^{p5,12} |
| Tyranno Ex | 1990 | |
| U-Boat | 1959, 1961 | A game simulating the struggle of U-boat to escape a destroyer attack. |
| UFO | 1978 | |
| Up Front | 1983 | A World War II card-based wargame |
| USAC Auto Racing | 1979 | Originally published by Midwest Research in 1971. Simulation of the Indianapolis 500. Updated driver cards on even-numbered years through 1986. |
| Venture | 1983 | formerly published by 3M |
| Verdict | 1959 | |
| Verdict II | 1961 | |
| Victory in the Pacific | 1977 | Pacific War |
| War and Peace | 1980 | |
| War at Sea | 1976 | First published by Jedko Games in 1975 |
| War at Sea II | 1980 | |
| Waterloo | 1962 | |
| The Wedding Game | 1990 | |
| What Time Is It? | 1963 | pre-school children's line^{p7} |
| Win, Place & Show | 1966 | Horse racing simulation |
| Wizards | 1982 | |
| Wizard's Quest | 1979 | |
| Wooden Ships and Iron Men | 1975 | Naval combat 1776 to 1814 |
| Word Power | 1967 | |
| Wrasslin | 1990 | Pro wrestling simulation |
| Yanks | 1987 | ASL core module |
| Year of the Lord | 1968 | |
| Yellowstone | 1985 | |

== Victory Games ==
| Name | Year | Description |
|---|---|---|
| 1809 | 1984 | |
| 2nd Fleet | 1986 | |
| 3rd Fleet | 1990 | |
| 5th Fleet | 1989 | |
| 6th Fleet | 1985 | |
| 7th Fleet | 1987 | |
| A Nightmare on Elm Street | 1987 | |
| Across 5 Aprils | 1992 | |
| Aegean Strike | 1986 | |
| Ambush! | 1983 | A single player man-to-man wargame set in World War II France |
| Battle Hymn | 1986 | |
| Carrier | 1990 | |
| Central America | 1987 | |
| The Civil War 1861–1865 | 1983 | |
| Cold War | 1984 | |
| Desert Shield | 1990 | A Gulf Strike Expansion Module, two printings in 1990 |
| Flashpoint Golan | 1991 | |
| France 1944: The Allied Crusade in Europe | 1986 | |
| Gulf Strike | 1983 | updated 1988, new box art 1990 |
| Hell's Highway | 1983 | |
| James Bond 007 | 1983 | |
| The Korean War | 1986 | |
| Lee vs. Grant | 1988 | |
| Mosby's Raiders | 1985 | |
| NATO: The Next War in Europe | 1983 | |
| Omaha Beachhead | 1987 | |
| Open Fire | 1987 | |
| Pacific War | 1985 | |
| Panzer Command | 1984 | |
| Pax Britannica | 1985 | |
| The Peloponnesian War | 1991 | |
| Shell Shock! | 1990 | |
| Theater Analysis Model | 1983 | |
| Tokyo Express | 1988 | |
| Vietnam: 1965-1975 | 1984 | |

== Video games ==
| Name | Year | Description |
|---|---|---|
| 1830: Railroads & Robber Barons | 1995 | Adaptation of the Avalon Hill board game, 1830. |
| 5th Fleet | 1994 | |
| Achtung Spitfire! | 1997 | |
| Andromeda Conquest | 1982 | |
| Avalon Hill's Advanced Civilization | 1995 | |
| B-1 Nuclear Bomber | 1981 | |
| Beast War | 1985 | Science fiction action-strategy game. |
| Cave Wars | 1996 | |
| Computer Acquire | 1983 | Adaptation of the Avalon Hill Board Game, Acquire. 1983 version was for Atari 400/800, Apple II/II Plus, Pet 2001 and TRS-80. DOS version was released 1989 as IBM version. |
| Computer Football Strategy | 1983 | |
| Conflict 2500 | 1980 | Player's warships seek and destroy invading berserkers |
| Controller | 1982 | Air traffic control simulation |
| Death Trap | 1995 | |
| Defiance | 1998 | Under Visceral Productions |
| D-Day: America Invades | 1995 | |
| Dnieper River Line | 1982 | |
| Dreadnoughts | 1984 | |
| Empire of the Overmind | 1981 | |
| Flight Commander 2 | 1994 | early release by Avalon Hill Software, AH's second foray into video games |
| Galaxy | 1981 | Originally Galactic Empires, by Tom Cleaver |
| GFS Sorceress | 1982 | |
| History of the World | 1997 | |
| Incunabula | 1984 | |
| Kingmaker | 1994 | |
| Legionnaire | 1982 | |
| London Blitz | | |
| Lords of Karma | 1980 | |
| Midway Campaign | 1980 | |
| North Atlantic Convoy Raider | 1980 | |
| Nukewar | 1980 | |
| Operation Crusader | 1994 | |
| Over the Reich | 1996 | |
| Out of Control | 1997 | |
| Planet Miners | 1980 | |
| Ripper! | | |
| Shuttle Orbiter | | |
| Super Sunday | 1986 | |
| Space Station Zulu | 1982 | |
| Spitfire 40 | 1986 | Originally released by Mirrorsoft in 1985 |
| Telengard | 1982 | |
| TAC (Tactical Armor Command) | 1983 | |
| T.G.I.F | 1983 | |
| Third Reich | 1996 | |
| Under Fire | 1985 | |
| VC | 1982 | |
| Voyager I | 1982 | |
| Wall Ball | 1982 | |
| Wooden Ship & Iron Men | 1996 | |
| World at War: Stalingrad | 1995 | |

== Hasbro Avalon Hill ==
Some of these were originally developed independently and repackaged/republished by AH. Those marked re-issue were also previously published by AH before Hasbro bought the company.

| Name | Year | Description |
|---|---|---|
| Acquire | 1999 | re-issue |
| Axis and Allies | 2003 | Revised edition; Milton Bradley originally |
| Axis and Allies: Battle of the Bulge | 2006 | |
| Axis and Allies: D-Day | 2004 | |
| Axis and Allies: Europe | 1999 | |
| Axis and Allies Miniatures | 2005 | |
| Axis and Allies: Pacific | 2001 | |
| Battle Cry | 2000 | |
| Betrayal at Baldur's Gate | 2017 | |
| Betrayal at House on the Hill | 2004 | |
| Betrayal at Mystery Mansion | 2020 | |
| Cosmic Encounter | 2000 | Originally by Eon Games |
| Diplomacy | 1999 | Re-issue |
| The Great Dalmuti | 2005 | Originally by Wizards of the Coast |
| Guillotine | 2005 | Originally by Wizards of the Coast |
| HeroQuest | 2021 | Reprint of 1989, Revised again in 2023 |
| History of the World | 2001 | Re-issue |
| Ikusa | 1986 | |
| Monsters Menace America | 2005 | Re-development of Monsters Ravage America |
| Nexus Ops | 2005 | |
| Risk 2210 A.D. | 2001 | Risk variant |
| Risk Godstorm | 2004 | Risk variant |
| RoboRally | 2005 | Original game by Wizards of the Coast |
| Rocketville | 2006 | |
| Stratego: Legends | 1999 | Stratego variant |
| Star Wars - The Queen's Gambit | 2000 | |
| Sword and Skull | 2005 | |
| Vegas Showdown | 2005 | |
