= Football strategy =

Football strategy can refer to the strategy of any of the sports referred to as football.

See:

- Association football tactics and skills
- American football strategy
- Computer Football Strategy, a Commodore 64 computer game by Avalon Hill
