= Desert War =

Desert War may refer to:

- Desert warfare
- Desert War (horse), an Australian Thoroughbred racehorse
- North African Campaign, during the Second World War
- The Desert War, in Egypt and Libya during the Second World War
- Western Desert Campaign, in Egypt and Libya during the Second World War
- Desert War: Tactical Warfare in North Africa, a 1973 board wargame simulating the North African Campaign of WWII
- Desert War (game), a 1989 supplement for the game Up Front
