= Paydirt =

Paydirt or Pay dirt, in the field of mining, refers to dirt, rock, or other raw materials which contains (or may contain) profitable quantities of ore or other valuable materials. By analogy it may also refer to any profitable enterprise.

The term may also refer to:

- Pay Dirt, a 1916 American silent drama film directed by Henry King
- Paydirt (game), a two-player board game simulating American football
- Paydirt (Marvel Comics), a character in the Marvel Comics Universe
- Paydirt Pete, the mascot of the University of Texas at El Paso
- The international name of There Goes the Neighborhood, a 1992 American comedy film
- Paydirt (film), a 2020 American crime thriller film starring Val Kilmer
