= Guadalcanal (disambiguation) =

Guadalcanal is an island in the Solomon Islands

Guadalcanal may also refer to:

== Places ==
- Guadalcanal, Seville, a town in Andalusia in Spain
- Guadalcanal Province, a province in the Solomon Islands

== Military terms ==
- Guadalcanal campaign, a World War II military campaign fought on and around Guadalcanal
- USS Guadalcanal (CVE-60), a World War II escort carrier
- USS Guadalcanal (LPH-7), an amphibious assault ship
- Guadalcanal (1992 game), a board wargame by Avalon Hill
