= Blitzkrieg (board game) =

1965 board wargame

Cover of 1st edition, 1965

Blitzkrieg is a strategic-level wargame published by Avalon Hill in 1965 that simulates a non-historical attack by one major power against another using the blitzkrieg strategy. It was the first commercial wargame that did not simulate an actual historical battle, and with almost 400 counters, it was a precursor to the "monster" wargames of the 1970s featuring more than a thousand counters.

== Description ==
Blitzkrieg is a two-player wargame simulating military technology used at the end of World War II. The game uses a large hex grid map of a fictional continent dominated by the major powers "Big Red" and "Great Blue", with several neutral countries separating them.

Blitzkrieg was innovative in several respects, including being the first commercial wargame to offer partial eliminations as a combat result, and also the first that did not simulate a specific historical battle. Game historian Harry Lowood noted that "Players intrigued by the unprecedented array of military options in the game noticed the potential for experimentation, and a few articles proposing optional rules and other variants appeared in The General along with dozens of strategy articles." Lowood also noted that Jim Dunnigan and Redmond A. Simonsen of rival game company Simulations Publications Inc. used Blitzkrieg as a "starting point" for their new Blitzkrieg Module System series, which ultimately produced eighteen modules, constructed so that "players could use some or all of them, also picking and choosing physical components from Blitzkrieg."

=== Components ===
The original 1965 edition contained:

- 390 die-cut counters (189 Blue counters plus 6 blank, 187 Red counters plus 8 blank)
- 44" x 22" hex grid game board featuring several different types of terrain (clear, forest, mountains, desert)
- Basic rule book
- Advanced/Tournament rule book
- 6-sided die
- Order of Appearance sheets
- Time Record sheet
- Game attrition tables

=== Setup ===
Great Blue places "Turn 1" units on any hexes within its borders. Big Red then does the same.

=== Gameplay ===
Each turn, Great Blue goes first, adding any units from the Order of Appearance sheet to the map before moving units and engaging in combat. Once Great Blue has moved all units desired, Big Red has the same opportunity to place reinforcements and move.

Terrain and Movement: Plain terrain has a movement cost of 1. Armor may not enter forest hexes. All units entering a mountain hex must stop upon entering and wait for the next turn to continue moving at a rate of 1 mountain hex per turn. Defenders in mountain terrain double their defensive value.

Zone of Control: Every unit has a zone of control in the hexes adjacent to it — enemy units that enter the zone of control must stop and engage in combat.

Combat: The ratio of attackers to defenders is determined, a die is rolled and the result is seen on the Attrition Table. This can vary from a draw to a forced retreat, or partial or complete elimination.

Players can stack units in the same hex up to a combined combat value of 12. Stacked counters move at the rate of the slowest counter in the stack.

=== Victory conditions ===
The Basic game lasts for 15 turns, and a player wins by fulfilling one of these victory conditions:

- eliminating all opposing units
- occupying all cities in the opposing player's home country for one complete turn
- holding more than 25 cities by the 15th turn

If neither player is able to meet any of the victory conditions by the end of the 15th turn, the game ends in a draw.

The Tournament game has no time limits, so only the first two victory conditions are valid, and the game cannot end in a draw unless by mutual consent.

== Publication history ==
Blitzkrieg was designed by Larry Pinsky and Thomas Shaw, and was released by Avalon Hill in 1965. The game was a bestseller for the company, and paved the way for "monster" wargames of more than 1,000 counters.

Ten years after its original publication, Dave Roberts revised the rules and Avalon Hill published a second edition in 1975 that used all of the original components of the 1965 edition except for a revised rulebook and Attrition Table. By that time, the innovations of the original edition had inspired a new generation of monster wargames, and Blitzkrieg, even with revised rules, was seen as outmoded. As a result, the second edition did not become the bestseller that the 1965 edition had been.

== SPI's Bliztkrieg Module System ==
In 1969, the newly founded wargame publisher Simulations Publications Inc. (SPI) introduced the Blitzkrieg Module System set of modules for Blitzkrieg that allowed players to add combinations of new rules to explore new ways to play the game. These rules included the use of navies, armies for the small neutral countries, railways, production, weather and guerillas. Although SPI provided the new rules, as well as more counters and revised charts, players still needed to buy a copy of Avalon Hill's original Blitzkrieg in order to use SPI's modules. As Nicholas Palmer noted, this was a "unique example of one leading company building on the game of another."

== Reception ==
In his 1977 book The Comprehensive Guide to Board Wargaming, Nicholas Palmer called the game an "Ambitious attempt to incorporate every aspect of modern warfare in an abstract context does not quite come off; both sides very similar [forces], and most players steer the game into boring wars of attrition." Palmer did note that if both players were aggressive, "the game comes alive with a bang."

In The Playboy Winner's Guide to Board Games, game designer Jon Freeman didn't think Blitzkrieg was very good, commenting, "Politicians who try to be all things to all people tend to be as slippery and hard to pin down as Proteus, and games similarly designed give me that old Wizard of Oz feeling — that beneath the shifting facade is nothing of substance."

In The Guide to Simulations/Games for Education and Training, Martin Campion pointed out that although the game was based upon strategies used during World War II, "Its result is more like that of World War I [...] because the two opponents are equal in power and weapons. So it is a lengthy game of attrition which is quite likely to be given up before it is concluded."

In a retrospective review in The General, Robert Harmon recalled that Blitzkrieg "opened the floodgates to a host of land wargames of increasing complexity and originality." Harmon thought that Blitzkrieg still offered the player increased opportunities for imaginative play, saying, "The wargamer has freedom of action over a continental areas, with fewer restrictions that War and Peace or Third Reich."

The website Unplugged Games Cafe thought that despite its age, Blitzkrieg has much to offer, saying, "It is still a good two player game and there is enough variation so it won't get stale. It has a WWII or early cold war feel to it."

Wargamer Academy calls it "a good introductory game and also challenging in the advanced and optional rule forms. Despite its lack of correlation to an actual battle/campaign, this was a best seller."

== Other recognition ==
A copy of Blitzkrieg is held in the collection of the Strong National Museum of Play (object 112.6283).

== Other reviews and commentary ==
- Panzerfaust and Campaign No. 72 (Mar–Apr 1976)
