= Midway (1964 game) =

- Game box cover Cover art for Midway
- Players: 2+
- Setup time: 15 minutes
- Playing time: 2 to 4 hours
- Chance: Medium
- Age range: 10 and up
- Skills: Planning, Intuition, Surprise

Midway is a board wargame published by Avalon Hill in 1964 that simulates the Battle of Midway during World War II.

== Background ==
Six months after the attack on Pearl Harbor, Japan looked to extend its defensive perimeter by attacking and occupying the U.S. base on Midway Atoll. To do this, the Japanese navy sent a strong fleet of four aircraft carriers, two battleships and a variety of smaller craft, hoping to lure the American fleet into a trap. Unbeknownst to the Japanese, cryptographers had broken their fleet code and knew about the attack. Both forces sent aircraft to scout for the enemy fleet's position, but it was American airplanes that found the Japanese fleet first. In a series of devastating torpedo and dive bomb attacks, American airplanes sunk all four aircraft carriers and a heavy cruiser, suffering a loss of one aircraft carrier themselves. It was a pivotal battle in the Pacific war, causing losses Japan would not be able to replace, and giving momentum and confidence to the Americans.

== Description ==
Midway is a board wargame for 2 players (or more than 2 players divided into teams) that simulates the battle at the individual ship and squadron level.

Initiative in the game rests on the shoulders of the Japanese player, who must successfully invade the island of Midway with the heavy cruiser Atago within the time frame of the game. The American player seeks to prevent the Japanese player from successfully invading Midway. Both players also score points toward victory by sinking their opponent's ships.

=== Components ===
The game box includes:

- 22" x 34" mounted battle map
- 22" x 34" mounted search map and divider screen, set up so that neither player can see their opponent's side.
- 120 counters representing individual ships and squadrons of planes. Each ship has two counters, a 1/2-inch counter to fit the squares of the search board and a larger one for the rectangular grid of the battle board. The 1/2-inch airplane counters represent three types of aircraft: dive bombers, torpedo bombers, and fighters.
- 24-page rulebook
- pad of hit record sheets

=== Gameplay ===
The game starts at 0500 on June 4, 1942, and ends at 1700 on June 6, after 34 turns. Each turn represents 2 hours of game time.

The two boards used are the search board and the battle board. The bulk of the game takes place on the search board with battles being resolved on the battle board. The search board consists of two identical boards separated by a divider allowing the players to see their own fleet's location and movements, while the opponent's operations remain hidden. The search board is divided into large square areas which are each further divided into nine smaller square zones. The battle board consists of long rectangular spaces to fit the large ship counters provided for the battle phases of the game.

The game has two distinct segments, Search and Battle.

==== Search ====
In the search segment, players send out search planes (these are abstract planes and not represented by any counters) to search areas of the sea for the enemy fleet. If the areas searched contain enemy ships, the ships' owner must inform his opponent of the exact zone within the area and types of ships found there.

After the search has been conducted, players can now send out combat squadrons to attack enemy ships. For each zone in which ships and enemy planes are present, a battle is conducted on the battle board.

After all battles are resolved, the squadrons return to their carriers to undergo a turn of refitting.

==== Battle ====
When planes locate and attack an enemy fleet, the air-sea battle is resolved on the battle board. The owner of the ships first places his ships on the battle board as desired within rule-driven requirements for spacing between ships. The attacker then places his planes around the ships to indicate which squadrons are attacking which ships. Dive bombers must be placed on top of the ship being attacked, and torpedo bombers must be placed in the space either to port or starboard of the ship being attacked.

The defender then indicates which ships will direct their fire against which squadrons(known as "screening"). Each ship may screen against any squadron within a two space range and is not limited to screening against squadrons attacking itself. Then through comparison of various factors printed on the counters, and the roll of the die, hits are recorded, and losses are taken against the ships and attacking squadrons.

After one round of battle the ships and planes are removed from the board, and additional battles in other zones are resolved as required.

=== Victory conditions ===
- The American player receives a varying number of victory points for sinking each Japanese ship, and 1 victory point for every turn after 0500 June 5 that the Japanese player does not occupy Midway Island.
- The Japanese player receives a varying number of victory points for sinking each American ship, and 15 points for occupying Midway Island before the end of the game.

The player with the most victory points is the winner.

== Publication history ==
For a battle where much depended on searching for the opponent, game designers Lindsley Schutz and Larry Pinsky designed Midway with a double-blind hidden movement and search system. They used as a technical consultant C. Wade McCluskey, U.S. Navy Rear Admiral (Ret.), who had been air group commander on the USS Enterprise during the Battle of Midway, and had been credited by Admiral Nimitz with playing a pivotal role in the battle. The game was published by Avalon Hill in 1964. Eight years later, when company director Tom Shaw was looking to eliminate a game from Avalon Hill's line-up, only an intervention by Don Greenwood saved Midway. (The axe fell on 1914 instead.) Midway remained part of Avalon Hill's line of games through the 1980s.

In 1980, Avalon Hill released Midway Campaign, a videogame for various home computer platforms that was based to some extent on the board game. The videogame was a finalist for the Charles S. Roberts Award for "Best Computer Game of 1980".

In 1991, a revised "Smithsonian" edition of the board game was released to coincide with the 50th anniversary of the Attack on Pearl Harbor.

== Reception ==
In Issue 8 of Games & Puzzles, Don Turnbull noted "What little surface action there is can best be summed up in the word 'imprecise'. Which is a polite way of saying unsatisfactory from the naval point of view." Turnbull concluded, "For players who like a reasonably simple naval/air game, Midway is quite a good buy, but don't expect too much from it."

In his 1977 book The Comprehensive Guide to Board Wargaming, Nicholas Palmer felt that the game, already 12 years old at the time he was writing, was "still played by people interested in the context." He noted, "The game is often tense and exciting, although realism is limited and the Japanese have a definite edge in the usual game (this an be corrected by varying search capacities.)

Bill Thompson, writing for the Wargame Academy, felt the game's "greatest strength is its simplicity and is ideal for introducing wargaming to new players." Thompson didn't feel that the 1991 Smithsonian edition was an improvement, saying, "Despite up to date graphics, standardized rulebook format and inclusion of much historical material as a modern introductory game, [the 1991 edition] seems more complex and not an actual improvement over the original."

In The Guide to Simulations/Games for Education and Training, Martin Campion noted, "This is a very realistic game except perhaps for the excessively large number of casualties suffered by attacking aircraft." In terms of using the game as an educational aid, Campion wrote, "In a classroom situation, the awkward search board rules could be replaced by the activities of an umpire."

== Other reviews and commentary ==
- Battleplan #3, #6 & #7
- Boardgamer #3
- Fire & Movement #12, #65 & #67
- Strategy & Tactics #29, #38 & #65
- The Wargamer Vol 1 #9 & Vol 1 #12
- Casus Belli #14 (April 1983)
- 1982 Games 100 in Games
