= Computer Stocks & Bonds =

1982 video game

- Publisher: Avalon Hill
- Platforms: Apple II, Atari 8-bit, Commodore 64, CP/M, MS-DOS, PET, TRS-80, VIC-20
- Release: 1982
- Genre: Simulation

Computer Stocks & Bonds is a video game published in 1982 by The Avalon Hill Game Company. It was released for the Apple II, Atari 8-bit computers, VIC-20, Commodore 64, IBM PC, and the CP/M-based Heath/Zenith Z-90 and Z-100. It is an adaptation of the 3M bookshelf game Stocks & Bonds, which was originally released in 1964.

== Gameplay ==
Computer Stocks & Bonds is a game in which the stock market is simulated. Players have ten turns, each representing one year, to invest in securities (the eponymous stocks and bonds) with differing risks and yields. The securities' market prices fluctuate annually. The player who accumulates the most wealth by the end of the tenth year is declared the winner.

== Reception ==
Bob Proctor reviewed the game for Computer Gaming World, and stated that "Plausible reasons are given for very large gains and losses but these are after the fact: winning is largely a matter of luck. Two factors make this game unique: it is the only one of the four available for computers other than the Apple and it is the only one which needs only 32K of RAM (instead of 48K)."
