= Victory in the Pacific =

1977 WWII board wargame

- Designers: Richard Hamblen
- Publishers: Avalon Hill
- Publication: 1977
- Genres: Board wargame
- Players: 2
- Age range: 12 and up

Victory in the Pacific (VITP) is a board wargame published by the Avalon Hill game company in 1977 that simulates the War in the Pacific during World War II.

== Gameplay ==
Victory in the Pacific is a two-player wargame that deals with the Pacific Theater of Operations of World War II. The rules are based on the game system first used in Avalon Hill's previously published game War at Sea (1976). The game takes 8 turns, each representing four to six months, except for the 1st turn which covers only December 1941. Games typically last about 5 hours. Playing pieces represent armies, air forces, and capital ships (aircraft carriers, battleships, battlecruisers, heavy cruisers, and light cruisers) of the United States Navy, Royal Navy, Dutch Navy, and Imperial Japanese Navy, and are given numerical ratings for gunnery, armor, speed, and airstrike power.

The board divides the Pacific Ocean into 13 sea zones. Each turn players commit their ship, air, and amphibious units to particular zones, and then (if there are opposing forces in the same area) a battle is fought in each zone, until one player retreats or is eliminated. Points of control (POC) are earned based on how many zones a player controls in that turn. Certain areas are worth more to one or both players than others. For example, the Japanese (IJN) player receives 3 POC for controlling Indonesia or the Japanese Islands, but only 1 for controlling the North Pacific. The Allied (USN) player receives only 1 POC for Indonesia, but 3 for the Hawaiian Islands.

One of the most basic strategic decisions in the game is which ships to use as "patrollers" and which to use as "raiders". Patrollers are deployed first, then land-based air, then amphibious units, and then raiders. So, saving ships for use as raiders allows a player to see a much more developed situation before committing ships, as well as allowing them to travel farther across the map. However, raiding ships do not count for "control" of an area as patrolling ships (and all land-based air flotillas) do, so some ships usually must be committed early to gain key POC—or to cut off enemy sea access because on the next turn, enemy ships will not be able to move through a controlled area although they may move into one.

Each side receives reinforcements throughout the game approximately coinciding to when the specific ships either became battle-ready in the actual war, or in the case of some Allied ships, were transferred in from the Atlantic theater. The IJN receives most of its ships at the beginning of the game, with only a few reinforcements, while the United States gets multiple additional vessels each turn. At the beginning of Turn 6 the Allied player receives massive US carrier reinforcements which shift the fleet balance dramatically and force the Japanese into a defensive posture. However, in the first 5 turns the IJN's larger fleet usually runs up a large POC advantage which even the USN's newly enlarged fleet may be hard-pressed to overcome in only 3 turns. This is somewhat mitigated because the Allied player (because the USA broke the Japanese code) gets to move second in every phase, e.g. he can wait to see where the Japanese raiders are placed before placing his own raiders, and in battle he can see the results of Japanese attacks before allocating his own fire.

This second-move advantage for the Allied is a large advantage for beginners. However, in expert play the Japanese are considered to have the advantage, because with experience players learn to use the threat of the more powerful IJN fleet very aggressively, dictating the Allied moves somewhat and offsetting much of the disadvantage of moving first. If the IJN can force a major battle, his larger fleet can more afford attrition, so Japan can afford to move into dangerous situations and trade ships 1 for 1, often even 2 for 3. Because of this, players usually bid POC for the IJN side to balance the game.

== Tournaments ==
Victory in the Pacific is still played in many competitive tournaments today, including the World Boardgaming Championships, PrezCon, MillenniumCon, VITP Midwest Open, and PBEM on gameaholics all for decades running, and still maintains AREA Ratings for players as well.

== Reception ==
In The Guide to Simulations/Games for Education and Training, Martin Campion called this game "very abstract but still shows a lot about the strategy of the Pacific War." Commenting on its use as an educational aid, Campion said, "Players can learn about the relationship of sea, air, and land forces in the Pacific, about the importance and the limits of land-based aircraft, about the great mobility of carrier forces. Combat is sometimes a bit tedious. In a classroom, each side ought to be played by a small committee. The abstraction of the game would make it difficult to divide up commands."

In the 1980 book The Complete Book of Wargames, game designer Jon Freeman commented that the game "is an enjoyable game to play — partly because of the very pleasing, high-quality game components, and partly because the game mechanics work so well. Although hardly realistic, it is challenging." Freeman noted the slight imbalance of the game, saying "the Japanese, unless extremely lucky, will usually lose — but not by much — and this slight inequality could be corrected by giving the Japanese an extra victory point or two per turn." Freeman concluded by giving the game an Overall Evaluation of "Very Good", saying, "Despite its abstract treatment, the game is quite popular."

In The Best of Board Wargaming (1980), Nick Palmer described War At Sea and its sister Victory In The Pacific as "excellent introductory fare to entice newcomers into the hobby" with the latter having a mere six pages of rules. He criticised the mechanism whereby damaged ships “sprout wings” (albeit affected by the ship’s individual speed factor) and return to port as “the most outrageous element in a pair of games with scanty claims to realism”. However, the games offer “light relief and fast movement” although they can also be played as “deadly serious contests of logic and mathematics”; the games are “primarily for beginners or statisticians, but also quite good as an occasional change from weightier things”. He gave VITP a very high rating for excitement (80%) but a very low 20% for realism.

== Awards ==
At the 1978 Origins Awards, Victory in the Pacific won the Charles S. Roberts Award in the category "Best Strategic Game of 1977".

== Other recognition ==
A copy of Victory in the Pacific is held in the collection of the Strong National Museum of Play (object 117.941), a gift of Darwin Bromley and Peter Bromley.

== Other reviews and commentary ==
- Casus Belli #16 (Aug 1983)
- 1983 Games 100
