= Blitzkrieg Module System =

Series of expansion modules

Cover of "flatpack" boxed edition, 1970

Blitzkrieg Module System is a series of expansion modules published by Simulations Publications Inc. (SPI) in 1969 that are designed to be used with the Avalon Hill board wargame Blitzkrieg.

== Description ==
Blitzkrieg was a popular non-historical board wargame published by Avalon Hill in 1965. Four years later, Jim Dunnigan and Redmond A. Simonsen, the co-founders of the new rival wargame company SPI, designed a series of 16 modules of new rules for Blitzkrieg. These allowed players to mix and match any combination of new and old rules in order to explore new ways to play the game. These rules included the use of navies, railways, air forces, the arming of the small neutral countries, production, weather and guerrillas.

Although SPI provided the new rules, as well as more counters and revised charts, most unusually, players still needed to buy a copy of Avalon Hill's original Blitzkrieg in order to use SPI's modules. As Nicholas Palmer noted, this was a "unique example of one leading company building on the game of another." In the 2016 book Zones of Control: Perspectives on Wargaming, Henry Lowood noted that "Players were thus given access to the [game] engine itself, mixing rules in any combination they chose with the rules of the original game."

== Publication history ==
Blitzkrieg Module System was originally published in Strategy & Tactics #9 as a pull-out game with paper counters that had to be glued to cardboard. SPI then released it as a boxed set with die-cut cardboard counters, first in a white box with a red stripe highlighting the title, then in 1979 as a "flatpack" boxed set.

== Reception ==
In Issue 30 of Albion, Charles Appleby found that the various modules only pin-pointed problems that he felt were not being addressed by the games industry, lack of simultaneous movement being the most important. Problems specific to this game included issues with the point system used to "buy" units; Appleby felt that "Even at the start, the forces are not by any means as equal as one could envisage possible." He concluded on an upbeat note though, saying, "Modular Blitzkrieg in my opinion marks the end of a generation of games. [...] The game is well worth getting purely for reference for any would-be designer."

In his 1977 book The Comprehensive Guide to Board Wargaming, Nicholas Palmer commented "Any attrition tendency in the original game is removed, and the result is widely felt to be an improvement, though naturally more complex."

In The Playboy Winner's Guide to Board Games, game designer Jon Freeman noted that "fans of Blitzkrieg's width-for-the-sake-of-width approach — with its extra-large board, land, sea, and air movement, and hundreds of counters, of a dozen types — will probably appreciate the Blitzkrieg Module System, which adds armies to the neutral countries and still more options to the rules. But most people will find better ways to spend their money."

Henry Lowood wrote, "SPI's Module System revisited Blitzkrieg not to improve Avalon Hill's game, but to morph it into a different, open system."

== Other reviews and commentary ==
- Strategy & Tactics Guide to Conflict Simulation Games, Periodicals, and Publications in Print #2
- Wargamer's Collector's Journal #7
