= Midway (1991 game) =

- Players: 2+
- Setup time: 15 minutes
- Playing time: 2 to 4 hours
- Chance: Medium
- Age range: 10 and up
- Skills: Planning, Intuition, Surprise

Midway is a board wargame published Avalon Hill in 1991 as a revision of a 1964 edition that simulates the Battle of Midway from World War II.

The onus of gameplay rests on the Japanese player who must attempt to bring forces to bear upon Midway Island. The United States player, though possessing a smaller force, has no geographical constraints placed on their naval forces.

== Components ==
=== Search Boards ===
The bulk of the game is played out on duplicate boards, one per player, with full knowledge of friendly forces but limited knowledge of the opponent's. Knowledge of opposing forces is gained by air and sea reconnaissance. Unlike the 1964 version, the search boards use hexagonal spaces to remove questions of corner adjacency.

=== Battle Boards ===
Air-surface and surface-surface battles are held on boards representing a small patch of open ocean. Unit deployments are made at the start of each battle.

=== Counters ===
Double-sided cardboard counters with dimensions between 1/2" and 3/4" represent combat aircraft squadrons, aerial reconnaissance squadrons, capital ships, and surface escort squadrons. Additional counters are used for record keeping, particularly damage and suspected enemy locations.

== Gameplay ==
=== Aircraft Availability ===
At most, aircraft are available every other turn. After completing a mission, they must spend one turn refueling and rearming before they can be used again. However, aircraft being fueled on an aircraft carrier pose an extreme fire hazard if the carrier is attacked, a vulnerability reflected by the rules.

=== Search ===
While not required, aerial reconnaissance is usually necessary for victory. Dedicated reconnaissance squadrons (and combat squadrons, if necessary) fly circuitous routes across the search board. The controlling player may ask his opponent if ships are present in any space flown over. However, asking about every space flown over tends to reveal to the opponent where the plane originated from. Once ships are encountered, the controlling player may elect to spend extra fuel to refine the search results. Depending on success, the opponent may report simply that "ships are present", that "[up to double the actual number of ships] are present", or potentially an exact number of ships by class are present.

=== Battle ===
Readied combat air units may be dispatched against any target in range, even if no information beyond "ships are present" is known. At the start of a battle, the opponent's true force is revealed; however, the attacker may not elect to bring reinforcements or flee with his current force. Game mechanics encourage historic tactics such as fighter cover and multiple-direction assaults. Units may sustain six levels of damage before destruction; however, damage can occur at rates beyond one level of damage per attack.

=== Multiplayer ===
While designed primarily for two players, Midway is an excellent candidate for an umpired multiplayer game. For example, a four-player game might divide the United States forces into the historical Task Forces 16 and 17 while the Japanese forces could separate between the carrier group and the surface invasion force. In these games, the individual search boards are complete only for the forces under an individual player's control. Communication between allied players is limited (and subject to interception) and possibilities for confusion of friendly and opposing forces exist. The umpire serves to mediate all exchange of information and conduct all dice rolls in such games.

== Publication history ==
For a battle where much depended on searching for the opponent, game designers Lindsley Schutz and Larry Pinsky designed Midway with a double-blind hidden movement and search system. They used as a technical consultant C. Wade McCluskey, U.S. Navy Rear Admiral (Ret.), who had been air group commander on the USS Enterprise during the Battle of Midway, and had been credited by Admiral Nimitz with playing a pivotal role in the battle. The game was published by Avalon Hill in 1964.

Twenty-seven years later, in 1991, as part of the Smithsonian American History Series, Avalon Hill released a revised edition to coincide with the 50th anniversary of the attack on Pearl Harbor.

== Reception ==
Bill Thompson, writing for the Wargame Academy, felt the game's "greatest strength is its simplicity and is ideal for introducing wargaming to new players." Thompson didn't feel that the 1991 Smithsonian edition was an improvement over the original 1964 edition, saying, "Despite up to date graphics, standardized rulebook format and inclusion of much historical material as a modern introductory game, [the 1991 edition] seems more complex and not an actual improvement over the original."
