= Bowl Bound =

Board game

Bowl Bound was a board game originally marketed in 1973 by Time Inc., owner of Sports Illustrated Magazine. It was part of a line of sports games sold under the SI umbrella. In 1978, rights to the games and time-limited use of the "Sports Illustrated Game" banner were sold to Baltimore-based Avalon Hill.

The game allowed 32 select NCAA I-A teams from 1960 to 1970, including a few Ivy League squads, to be pitted against one other. For each team, statistical grids based on actual, specific team strengths balanced nine offensive plays against six defensive formations. There were weighted probabilities were expressed by offensive (216 outcomes) and defensive (36 outcomes) dice rolls for simplified but statistically informed results.

Two additional team sets of 20 teams apiece, dating between 1940 through 1978 and 1979 through 1988 respectively, were sold before the rise of computerized sports led to the game's discontinuation in the 1990s.

Updated Bowl Bound charts for the most recently completed seasons (1966-2009) are available at maysfootball.com. Updated charts are also available for Paydirt.

An NFL version, Paydirt, was marketed annually by Avalon Hill for decades.
