= USAC Auto Racing =

USAC Auto Racing is a 1979 board game published by Avalon Hill.

== Gameplay ==
USAC Auto Racing is a game in which the Indianapolis 500 is simulated with a statistical replay system. The game features a large circuit with multiple lanes on straights and corners, and includes 33 plastic race cars, each associated with a driver card. These cards contain statistics, photos of real racers, and a dice-based system for movement and risk. Players can choose different driving strategies—Charging, Normal, or Backing Off—with varying risks. Additional dice rolls determine potential hazards and damage when entering the pits.

== Reception ==
USAC Auto Racing was reviewed in Perfidious Albion #38 (April 1979) which stated that "The game is statistically good, but not too hot on gameability. It fulfils all its promises and will be enjoyed by followers of the US circuit. Each year will see a new stack of player cards being produced. It does have a neat time-trial method."
