= Monsters Menace America =

Board game

- Publication: 2005
- Players: 2-4
- Setup time: 5 minutes
- Playing time: 90 minutes
- Chance: Dice, Cards
- Age range: 12 and up

Monsters Menace America is a 2005 light-strategy board game produced by Avalon Hill, a subsidiary of Wizards of the Coast. The game design is by J.C. Connors and Ben Knight.

Monsters Menace America is a redevelopment of Monsters Ravage America, a game published by Avalon Hill shortly before they were acquired by Hasbro in 1998. This new edition streamlined some rules and drastically improved the aesthetics of the game by adding plastic monsters and military units.

Like the original version, players are B-Movie monsters who rampage across America, destroying cities, mutating at radioactive sites, and stomping on military bases and famous landmarks. In addition to the monsters, each player also controls a branch of the U.S. armed forces with which they can attack other players. The game ends with a final fight called the "Monster Challenge" where all the surviving monsters fight it out to determine the king.

The six monsters included in the game are Gargantis, Konk, Megaclaw, Tomanagi, Toxicor, and Zorb. Each of these represents a famous B-Movie archetype and possesses a special ability that distinguishes it from its fellow monsters. These abilities range from Konk's expertise at smashing fighter jets to Tomanagi's prowess in sea-based combat.

== Reviews ==
- Rue Morgue #66
- Syfy
