= The Stock Market Game =

- Designers: Thomas N. Shaw
- Illustrators: Jean Baer; Shaw Baer
- Publishers: Avalon Hill
- Publication: April 1, 1970; 55 years ago
- Genres: Economic game; Strategy game
- Players: 1–12
- Playing time: 60 minutes

The Stock Market Game is an economic strategy game involving negotiation designed by Thomas N. Shaw and published in 1970 by Avalon Hill. Players buy and sell five different stocks and bonds of fluctuating prices within timed rounds to ultimately become the richest player.

== Gameplay ==
The Stock Market Game is played on a board with three charts – the Quote Board detailing share prices, a Turns Chart recording the number of turns played, and a Trading Post listing the five securities that can be bought or sold – and a deck of Market Trend Cards. Market Trend Cards are either Bull (increased), Bear (decreased), or Mixed, and have different price changes depending on the net difference of shares bought and sold. One player acts as the broker, processing transactions between players and the bank.

Each round, players simultaneously have one minute to decide which shares each want to buy and sell, done by placing markers on the Trading Post next to the security. An egg timer included with the game is used to time each round. Following this, the broker completes all the purchases and sales indicated with markers by paying cash to or taking cash from each player accordingly. Lastly, a Market Trend Card is drawn, which alters share prices based on the amount bought and sold. Play continues using the new prices.

There are twelve rounds and the winner is the player with the most money by the end.

=== Alternate versions ===
The Stock Market Game includes four different versions, three of which are variations on the most basic ruleset, known as "Game I". "Game II" allows players to buy on margin and sell short, buy risky stock at a discount using warrants, and convert preferred assets into a blue chip stock. "Game III" or "Solitaire" is a single-player version which pits a player against the public. "Game IV" or "1929" simulates the Wall Street crash of 1929 based on the Dow Jones averages of the time.

== Reception ==
Writing for Issue 50 of Games & Puzzles, Steve Jackson criticized its lack of economic realism and its reliance on luck-based gameplay, concluding that "all in all, the whole thing is a bit tedious – I can't understand why the game has survived so long." Don Turnbull, in his gaming magazine Albion, described The Stock Market Game as "an intriguing little game and excellent play value," praising its simple rules and different versions. In The Playboy Winner's Guide to Board Games, Jon Freeman heavily compared the game to Stocks & Bonds, also stating that "[The Stock Market Game] at times allows players too great a control over the total market" and strongly criticizing the 1929 "crash" version for its lack of historical understanding. Writing for Issue 4 of Moves, Martin Campion described the game as "undoubtedly the best of several stock market games I have seen," praising it for its strategy and many alternate rules and versions. Chicago Today called the game "an outstanding product of its times."

== Reviews ==
- The Guide to simulations/games for education and training
