= Voyager I (video game) =

1981 video game

- Publisher: Avalon Hill
- Designer: William D. Volk
- Programmer: William D. Volk
- Platforms: Apple II, Atari 8-bit. PET, TRS-80, TRS-80 Color Computer
- Release: 1981: Apple II; 1982: Atari

Voyager I: Sabotage of the Robot Ship is a computer game designed and programmed by William D. Volk, and published by the Microcomputer Games division of Avalon Hill. It was originally released for the Apple II in 1981, with later versions for the Atari 8-bit computers, TRS-80 Color Computer, TRS-80, and Commodore PET.

== Gameplay ==
Voyager I is a real-time science fiction game in which the player must prevent an alien ship from destroying Earth.

== Reception ==
Dave Jones reviewed the game for Computer Gaming World, and stated that "I feel that while the graphics of Voyager I are good the game design itself is too simplistic to hold the interest of the average computer game player for very long. If persistence is your "thing" you will find Voyager I interesting but those who enjoy employing strategies or arcade arcade skills will probably want to look elsewhere."

Bruce Berrien reviewed Voyager I in Space Gamer No. 67. Berrien commented that "the game is slow-moving and rather boring [...] Voyager I quickly becomes predictable."
