= Dreadnoughts (1984 video game) =

1984 strategy video game

- Publisher: Avalon Hill
- Platforms: Apple II, Commodore 64
- Release: 1984
- Genre: Strategy

Dreadnoughts is a strategy video game published in 1984 by Avalon Hill.

== Gameplay ==
Dreadnoughts is a game in which the player must use a German ship to evade the British squadron and disrupt Allied shipping in World War II.

== Reception ==
Johnny L. Wilson reviewed the game for Computer Gaming World, and stated that "there is much that is pleasing about the game. It is extremely enjoyable to play against the computer and truly experience (sometimes quite literally) the "fog" of war."
