= France 1944: The Allied Crusade in Europe =

1986 World War II wargame

France 1944
- Designers: Mark Herman
- Illustrators: Ted Koller; James Talbot
- Publishers: Victory Games
- Publication: 1986
- Genres: World War II

France 1944: The Allied Crusade in Europe is a World War II board wargame published by Victory Games in 1986 that simulates the combat in France and Germany following the breakout of Allied armies from Normandy following D-Day.

== Background ==
Following the Allied invasion of Normandy beaches on D-Day, German forces managed to bottle up the Allied advance out of the beachhead, using adept defenses and the bocage hedges of Norman farms to blunt Allied attacks. But in August, a British/Canadian attack and a simultaneous American attack caught the Germans in a pincer. Remaining German forces fled across France back to Germany as the Allies, with lengthening supply line issues, attempted to follow closely.

== Description ==
France 1944 is a board wargame for 2 players, where one player controls Allied forces, while the other controls German forces. It is not complex game — Vae Victis rated its complexity as only 2 on a scale of 5 — and is not a large game either, only having 130 counters, a 20-page rulebook and a single 80 x 54 cm hex grid map scaled at 30 kilometres (19 mi) per hex.

=== Gameplay ===
At the start of each turn, players purchase initiative counters (a maximum of 5 for the Allied player and 3 for the German player) using a limited number of Supply Points. The initiative counters for each player are put into a cup along with an Administrative Phase (AP) counter, and then a counter is pulled from the cup at random. The player whose counter is drawn can activate an HQ counter. The HQ counter indicates how many infantry and armored units it can command to move and attack, as well as its range of effect. Once the player is finished, another initiative counter is drawn from the cup. This cycle continues until all counters have been drawn. This marks the end of the game turn, which represents a month of time. The game ends after nine turns.

If the AP marker is drawn, both players can move reinforcements and replacements onto the map.

=== Victory conditions ===
The Allied player wins by capturing key towns in France as well as in Germany. The German player wins by preventing this.

== Publication history ==
After TSR suddenly took over Simulations Publications Inc. (SPI) in 1983, many of SPI's game designers left the company and joined Avalon Hill, which formed a special division, Victory Games, just for them. One of those designers, Mark Herman, created France 1944, which was published in 1986 with artwork by Ted Koller and James Talbot.

Herman brought out a revised "Designer Signature" edition, published by Compass Games in 2020. A linked Eastern Front game called "Russia 1944" has been promised.

== Reception ==
In Issue 39 of the French games magazine Casus Belli, Yves Jourdain was excited by this game, writing, "This isn't a wargame — it's a game of ping-pong! The game is incredibly fast-paced; actions and reactions follow one another at a breakneck speed, thanks to an extremely fluid game sequence." Jourdain agreed that the game was unbalanced in favor of the Allies, noting, "The German player will struggle to avoid — at the very least — a marginal Allied victory. An unbalanced game, you ask? Yes, of course; since that imbalance existed in reality, it was bound to be faithfully reflected in the simulation." Jourdain concluded, "It's beautifully designed and visually appealing, doesn't take up much space, and offers a fast, smooth gameplay experience. Bravo, we want more."

In Issue 41 of the French wargame magazine Vae Victis (September–October 2001), Jean-Philippe Liardet and Théophile Monnier compared World War II wargames that covered the war in France in 1944, and despite the fact that France 1944 was 15 years old, called it "The best game at this scale, despite its dated graphics." The pair noted, "The most entertaining rule involves players purchasing activation counters using their supply points; these are then drawn at random to determine who gets to act." Liardet and Monnier concluded by giving the game a rating of 4 out of 5.
