= Amoeba Wars =

Board game

Amoeba Wars is a 1981 board game published by Avalon Hill.

== Gameplay ==
Amoeba Wars is a science fiction game in which players must take control of Saestor, the former capital of the empire.

== Reception ==
Eric Goldberg reviewed Amoeba Wars in Ares Magazine #9 and commented that "As an investment, Amoeba Wars is a good risk, whether or not the reader groans and pardons the pun."

David Ladyman reviewed Amoeba Wars in The Space Gamer No. 42. Ladyman commented that "In general, I found the game uninteresting, but I can't necessarily say the same for you. I detect undercurrents of Risk and Cosmic Encounter in Amoeba Wars. Some of you will like the game, some won't."
