= Civilization (1980 board game) =

1980 strategy board game

- Civilization box cover Avalon Hill edition (1981) with cover art by Rodger B. MacGowan
- Other names: Civilisation
- Designers: Francis Tresham
- Publishers: Hartland Trefoil; Avalon Hill; Gibson Games
- Publication: 1980
- Genres: Board game
- Players: 2–7
- Setup time: 15 minutes
- Playing time: 3–12 hours
- Chance: Low
- Skills: Strategy game

Civilization is a board game published in the United Kingdom in 1980 by Hartland Trefoil and in the United States in 1981 by Avalon Hill. It simulates the rise of various Eastern Mediterranean civilizations through trading of commodities and purchase of attributes of civilization such as architecture, coinage, and agriculture.

== Gameplay ==
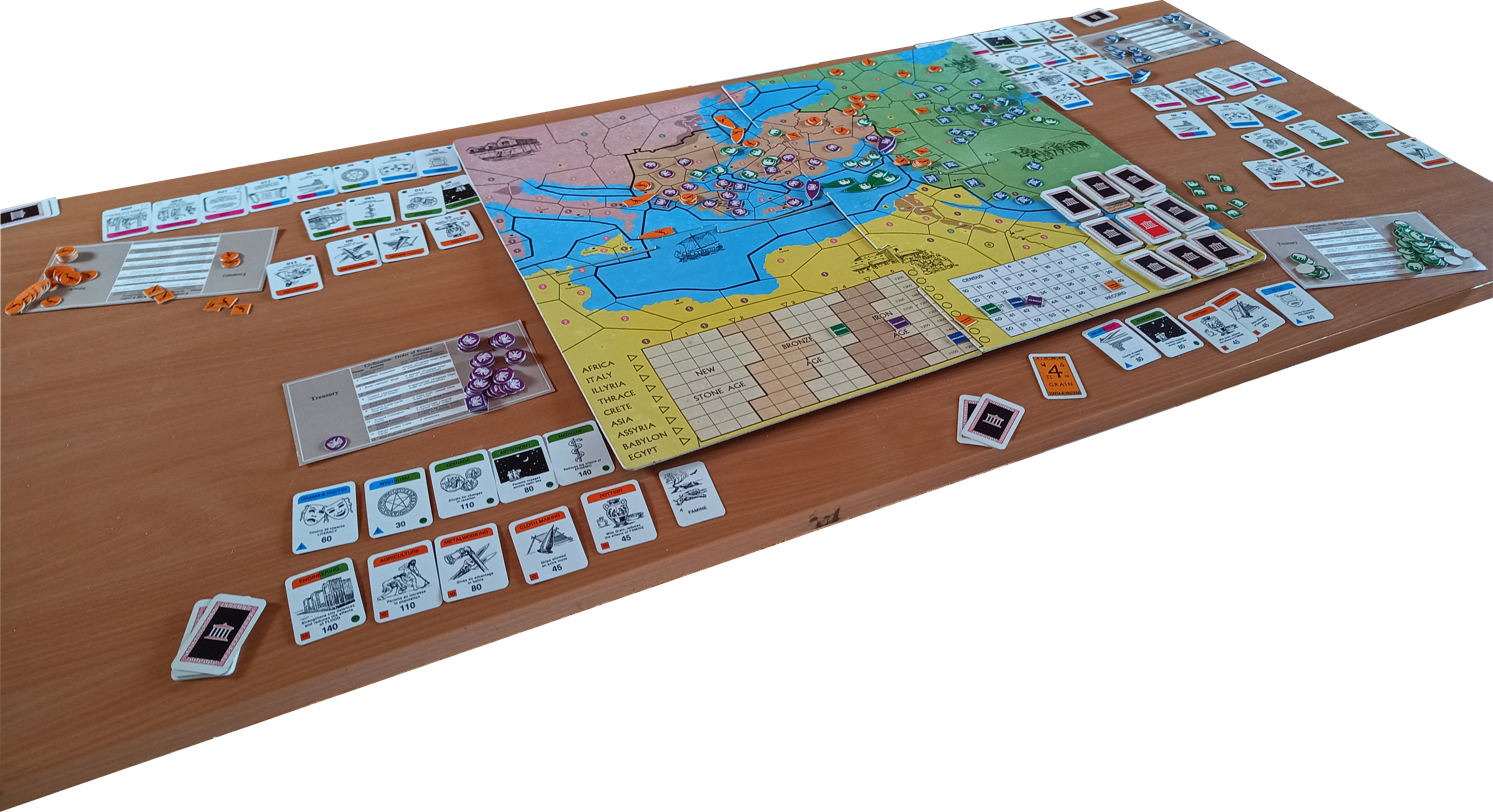
End of 6h 4-player game on Greece and Asia

Civilization is a board game for 2 to 7 players that is set in the Mediterranean basin. Each player controls one of nine historic civilizations such as Egypt, Babylon, or Crete. Each civilization starts in the Neolithic Age at 8000 BCE as hunter-gatherers with no attributes of civilization, and may reach the Iron Age. The players each attempt to expand while minimizing the effects of disasters and war. The map covers the Eastern Mediterranean area, and is divided into areas. Each area has a number from 1 to 5, indicating how many population counter is can support. Some areas have small squares, indicating a potential city site.

=== Population growth and city building ===
A game starts with each player placing a single population token on one of the starting areas of their civilization. For example, Crete must start on one of the two spaces on the island of Crete, while Egypt must start on one of the two spaces on the Nile Delta. The population doubles in the first few turns, and a player can convert excess population into cities by gathering six population tokens into an area with a settlement marker. Areas without a settlement marker require twelve counters to create a city. At the end of the city-building phase, players must remove unsupported excess population from each area.

=== Trade ===
Trade is how a civilization advances. Once population has grown and cities have been built, players start to receive commodities. There are eleven commodities in the game valued from 1 to 9, placed face-down in nine stacks. (The commodity cards of equal value, Hides and Ochre with a value of 1 each, and Papyrus and Iron with a value of 2, are shuffled together in their respective stacks). The commodities are: Hides/Ochre, Papyrus/Iron, Salt, Grain, Cloth, Bronze, Spices, Gems, and Gold.

At the end of population expansion and city building, each player gains one card from each commodity stack up to the number of cities owned. For example, a player with one city draws a single card from the Hides/Ochre stack. A player with three cities draws one card each from the Hides/Ochre, Papyrus/Iron and Salt stacks. Players can hold on to their Trade cards until they are ready to spend them, so it is possible for some of the commodity stacks to be empty at certain points in the game if one or more players are holding on to large numbers of certain commodities.

Once trade cards have been distributed, five minutes of trading starts. Each player can offer any other player a minimum of three of their cards unseen, and must tell the truth about one of the cards and how much all of the cards being offered are worth. Another player can respond in kind, offering to trade at least three cards, also telling the truth about one card and their total worth. Haggling is expected; once a deal has been reached, the players trade the offered cards face down and move on to their next trade.

The purpose of trading is to build up sets of the same commodity. One trade card is only worth its value, but having more of the same card increases the set's value by the formula Y squared x Z, where Y is the number of trade cards, and Z is the value of the commodity. For example, one grain card is worth 4 points, but two are worth 2x2x4 = 16 points, and three are worth 3x3x4 = 36 points. To remove math from the game, the values of sets are printed on each trade card. The power of building a complete set of one commodity can net substantial points. For example, collecting all four gems cards pays 4x4x8 = 128 points, while collecting all nine salt cards pays 9x9x3 = 243 points.

=== Calamities ===
Shuffled into all the decks of commodities except Hides/Ochre are various calamities such as Famine, Civil War and Flood. In commodities 2–5, the calamity cards have a red back, and are inflicted on the drawing player. The calamity cards in commodities stacks 6–9 look identical to commodity cards — if a player is dealt one or more of these when collecting commodity cards, the player has one trading session to attempt to surreptitiously trade them to another player. The player receiving a calamity in a trade has the calamity inflicted on them.

=== Civilization cards ===
After trading is complete and calamities are resolved, players can cash in their sets of commodity cards to purchase attributes of civilization. These are ranked from cards of low value such as Mysticism to cards of high rank such Democracy. Many cards such as agriculture, coinage, philosophy and medicine grant special abilities and give bonuses toward future civilization card purchases.

=== Victory conditions ===
Players track their progress on the Archaeological Succession Table (AST), which contains 15 spaces for each civilization. Each turn, all civilizations are moved forward one space, unless the next space contains a condition for advancement, such as having a certain a certain number of cities or owning a certain attribute of civilization such as Democracy. The first player to reach the 15th space on the AST is the winner.

== Publication history and expansions ==
Civilization was designed by Francis Tresham, and was published in the United Kingdom in 1980 by Hartland Trefoil and in the United States in 1981 by Avalon Hill.

The game sold well, and resulted in a number of expansions:

- Advanced Civilization (1991) contains simplified trading rules and gives every civilization the possibility to buy all civilization advances. It also adds more trading cards, civilization advances, calamities and rules for up to eight players.
- Trade Card Set (1982): Adds additional commodities such as timber, silver and ivory to reduce the frequency of calamities, reduce the risk for a shortage in low value trade cards, and increase the challenge of making large sets.
- Western Extension Map (1988): Extends the game board west of Italy to cover Gaul, parts of the Iberian peninsula, the British isles and northwest Africa.

In 1995, an unlicensed expansion titled Eastern Expansion Map was published in the Spanish magazine Alea #21 that added several new civilizations and covered the areas of Persia, the westernmost parts of the Indian subcontinent, and Arabia.

After Avalon Hill was taken over by Hasbro, the game went out of print. In 2018, it was republished by Gibsons Games.

== Adaptations and follow-ups ==
=== Avalon Hill video games ===
- Aed an MS-DOS computer game version of the board game titled Incunabula in 1984. Besides the main game, it includes two shorter variants, one eliminating trade and one that includes only trade.
- In 1995, Avalon Hill released another MS-DOS computer game Avalon Hill's Advanced Civilization, which used slightly modified rules from the Advanced Civilization expansion.

=== Sid Meier's Civilization and Civilization: Call to Power ===
The board game shares the name and the basic broad themes of expansion, development and conflict with the MicroProse video game Civilization by Sid Meier that came out in 1991. MicroProse did pay Avalon Hill a licensing fee for the name. Sid Meier's Civilization was followed by a long series of video games and board games as a major franchise of its own, later continued by Sid Meier's new company Firaxis Games.

In 1998, MicroProse filed a lawsuit against Activision, who licensed the rights to the board game and published their version as Civilization: Call to Power (inspired by MicroProse's own Civilization II), and Avalon Hill to secure the rights for using the name. The lawsuit was settled amicably in 2000, with Avalon Hill selling all rights to the Civilization franchise to MicroProse. MicroProse was acquired by Hasbro soon afterwards and a sequel to the Activision game was released as only just Call to Power II.

=== Age of Renaissaince ===
Avalon Hill's Age of Renaissance, published in 1996, uses a few features of Civilization, such as commodities (no longer collectible cards but territories) and the civilization advances (no longer cards but ticks in a check list). Age of Renaissance won the Origins Award for Best Pre-20th Century Board Game of 1996.

== Reception ==
=== Reviews ===
In Issue 1 of Adventure Gaming, Gerry Ball noted "Repeated playings of the game have revealed few glaring faults - a tribute to the thought and effort put into the game design. There appears to be few superfluous details, and so far only very occasional arguments over the interpretation of the rules have occurred." Despite the length of the game, Ball commented, "As there appears to be no short-cuts to success, the players' interest level is maintained throughout the game. It is difficult to become bored unless, of course, you habitually lose!" Ball concluded, "There are few board games I have played that have been such a joy to play and also as technically brilliant. These attributes rarely go hand-in-hand together."

In Issue 17 of the French games magazine Jeux & Stratégie, Michel Brassinne commented, "Magnificently presented, Civilization brings into play the various components of development and the complex interactions between them. Functioning simultaneously as a wargame, an economic game, and a game of alliances, it is also remarkably well-balanced." Brassinne concluded, "It is highly representative of the evolution taking place within simulation games; mastering a single field is no longer enough to emerge victorious. Strength and strategic acumen must be complemented by the measured approach of a skilled manager."

In Issue 30 of Games, R. Wayne Schmittberger commented, "Ambitious in scope and masterly in design, Civilization offers an exceptional blend of sophistication and simplicity that should make it a classic." At the end of 1982, Schmittberger placed Civilization in "Games Top 100 Games of 1982."

In the February 1983 edition of Dragon magazine (Issue #70), Tony Watson thought the game was ground-breaking, saying, "Once in a while, a new game comes out that proves that there is still plenty of virgin territory out there for game designers to explore and plenty of room for innovative and imaginative approaches to those subjects. Avalon Hill's release, Civilization, is just such a game." He concluded, "Civilization is a game that defies comparison with others [...] It's a fine value and is highly recommended."

In Issue 44 of the French games magazine Casus Belli, François Bienvenue and Joe Casus thoroughly analyzed the mechanics of the game, then concluded, "In short, Civilization is a refreshing, fluid, yet captivating game—simple, but far from simplistic—that is just as enjoyable for a newcomer as it is for a seasoned player."

In the January 1990 edition of Games International (Issue 12), Steve Jones examined the game at length and concluded, "Civilization is an excellent multi-player game for those who like long games which require considerable thought, concentration and decision making."

Civilization was chosen for inclusion in the 2007 book Hobby Games: The 100 Best. Steven Savile commented that designer Francis Tresham "created a thinking gamer's game, one that deserves to be played around a table with friends — especially the cheerfully scheming sort."

=== Awards ===
At the 1983 Origins Awards, Civilization was awarded the Charles S. Roberts Award for "Best Pre-20th Century Boardgame of 1982".

== Legacy ==
Civilization is widely considered to be one of the most influential games in the strategy genre, cited as foundational to both the grand strategy and 4X subgenres. The game is also first in incorporating a technology tree (or "tech tree"), a common feature in subsequent board and video games, which allows players to gain certain items and abilities only after particular other items are obtained.
