= Guadalcanal (1992 game) =

- Box art for Guadalcanal Cover art for Guadalcanal
- Players: 2+
- Setup time: 15 minutes
- Playing time: 2 to 4 hours
- Chance: Medium
- Age range: 10 and up
- Skills: Planning, Intuition, Surprise

Guadalcanal is a board wargame published by Avalon Hill as part of the Smithsonian American History Series. The game simulates World War II naval battles near the Solomon Islands and is primarily designed for two players. It uses the same game design as the Smithsonian edition of Midway.

Scenarios include the naval battles of the Coral Sea, Guadalcanal, and Santa Cruz. Land combat is abstracted out of the game.

== Components ==
=== Search Boards ===
The bulk of the game is played out on duplicate boards, one per player, with full knowledge of friendly forces but limited knowledge of the opponent's. Knowledge of opposing forces is gained by air and sea reconnaissance. Various zones required for deployment or victory conditions are noted on the search boards.

=== Battle Boards ===
Air-surface and surface-surface battles are held on boards representing a small patch of open ocean. Unit deployments are made at the start of each battle.

=== Counters ===
Double-sided cardboard counters with dimensions between 1/2" and 3/4" represent combat aircraft squadrons, aerial reconnaissance squadrons, capital ships, surface escort squadrons, and transports. Additional counters are used for record keeping, particularly damage and suspected enemy locations.

== Gameplay ==
=== Aircraft Availability ===
At most, aircraft are available every other turn. After completing a mission, they must spend one turn refuelling and rearming before they can be used again. However, aircraft being fuelled on an aircraft carrier pose an extreme fire hazard if the carrier is attacked, a vulnerability reflected by the rules. Readied aircraft on ground airstrips have no such drawback.

=== Searching ===
While not required, aerial reconnaissance is necessary for victory. Dedicated reconnaissance squadrons (and combat squadrons, if necessary) fly circuitous routes across the search board. The controlling player may ask his opponent if ships are present in any space flown over. However, asking about every space flown over tends to reveal to the opponent where the plane originated from. Once ships are encountered, the controlling player may elect to spend extra fuel to refine the search results. Depending on success, the opponent may report simply that "ships are present", that "[up to double the actual number of ships] are present", or potentially an exact number of ships by class are present.

=== Battle ===
Readied combat air units may be dispatched against any target in range, even if no information beyond "ships are present" is known. At the start of a battle, the opponent's true force is revealed; however, the attacker may not elect to bring reinforcements or flee with his current force. Game mechanics encourage historic tactics such as fighter cover and multiple-direction assaults. Units may sustain six levels of damage before destruction; however, damage can occur at rates beyond one level of damage per attack. Similarly, land bases may be bombarded.

=== Multiplayer ===
While designed primarily for two players, Guadalcanal is an excellent candidate for an umpired multiplayer game. Where possible, allied commanders should have their forces split along historical lines. In these games, the individual search boards are complete only for the forces under an individual player's control. Communication between allied players is limited (and subject to interception) and possibilities for confusion of friendly and opposing forces exist. The umpire serves to mediate all exchange of information and conduct all dice rolls in such games.

== Expansion ==
Avalon Hill's magazine The General published official expansion scenarios for Guadalcanal and Midway in Volume 28 Issue 5. "What-if" scenarios are posited for a 1941 carrier engagement off Wake Island and a Japanese assault on the Panama Canal. Both games, plus a counter insert sheet and search board set in the magazine, are required for play.

== Reviews ==
- Casus Belli #75
