= EuroHit =

Card game

EuroHit is a card game designed by Chris Baylis that was published by FCB & Associates in 1992. It was republished as Assassin by Avalon Hill in 1994.

== Gameplay ==
Cover art of EuroHit, 1992

The game has the following components:

- a 54-card Destination deck
- a 181-card deck (23 special cards, 13 hazards, 93 kilometre distance cards, 52 transport cards)
- 6 player tokens
- a map

The players act as hit men who are also tour guides for important dignitaries. As the tour guides travel across Europe, players either use or secretly pass the Hitman card to other players. Players score points by avoiding the Hit Man player when not the Hit Man, and by hitting other players' tourists while holding the Hit Man card.

There are four "machine gun" cards in the deck that must be placed faceup on the table as soon as they are drawn. When the fourth machine gun is drawn, the game immediately ends, and the player with the most points wins.

== Publication history ==
EuroHit was originally published in the UK in 1992. The game rights were purchased by Avalon Hill, which published the game with a modified ruleset under the title Assassin in North America in 1994.

== Reception ==
In the April 1994 edition of Dragon (Issue #204), Lester W. Smith reviewed the original EuroHit game. He criticized the quality of the physical components as "terrible", but thought the game itself was fun.

In Vol.29, No. 3 of The General, David Curry found Avalon Hill's rewrite of the rules left some ambiguities, sometimes stranded players between two cities, and provided too little interaction between the players. Curry suggested several rule changes to improve the game.
