= Maharaja (game) =

Maharaja is a 1994 board game published by Avalon Hill.

== Gameplay ==
Maharaja is a game in which a long, multi‑turn historical conquest game has shifting empires—each with distinct arrival times, goals, and regional feuds—expand, clash, and gradually weaken across India as players maneuver factions toward their scripted ambitions amid constant invasions and territorial struggle.

== Reception ==
Perfidious Albion felt that "The counters are really top-class, good illos with full colour and none of the GMT glare and clutter."

== Reviews ==
- Casus Belli #84
