= Napoleon's Battles =

1989 board game

Napoleon's Battles is a board game published in 1989 by Avalon Hill.

== Contents ==
Napoleon's Battles is a game in which two sets of 15mm scale counters are included with a miniatures rules system in three booklets.

== Reception ==
Mike Siggins reviewed Napoleon's Battles for Games International magazine, and gave it a rating of 5 out of 10, and stated that "quantity cannot replace quality and at the end of the day this is no more than a decidedly average set of miniatures rules with a few smart counters thrown in."

== Reviews ==
- Fire & Movement #74
