= Up Front (game) =

World War II card-based wargame

- Cover art by Rodger B. MacGowan
- Designers: Courtney Allen
- Illustrators: Rodger B. MacGowan
- Publishers: Avalon Hill; Wargame Vault
- Years active: 1983–present
- Genres: World War II
- Players: 2
- Playing time: 60+ minutes
- Website: Wargame Vault

Up Front, subtitled "The Squad Leader Card Game", is a card-based wargame published by Avalon Hill in 1983 that is based on the company's bestseller board wargame Squad Leader.

== Description ==
Up Front was intended as a card version of the successful Squad Leader franchise, but rather than the traditional hex grid map and cardboard counters, Up Front uses cards to define terrain, attack opportunities, and other factors. Locations of opponents are revealed as the game is played.

The game contains two different kinds of cards, Personality and Action. A Personality card depicts a single soldier and several statistics about him including his name, rank, and the weapon he is carrying. These are assigned by the scenario selected (scenarios lettered A-L were included in the base game) and arranged in groups by the players. The Action Deck contains different types of cards including terrain, movement, heroes, and many other game factors. These are shuffled and dealt to the players.

The game includes German, American, and Russian units along with their equipment. (Expansions added to the nationalities available for play.) Each nationality is given different capabilities including variations that impose different tactics for the players by limiting the options available to them.

== Publication history ==
In 1977, Avalon Hill published the tactical small-team board wargame Squad Leader, which became a bestseller for the company. Courtney Allen designed several scenarios for the game. Allen subsequently designed Up Front, which was published by Avalon Hill in 1983 with box cover artwork by Rodger B. MacGowan.

=== Expansions ===
Avalon Hill released two expansions:

- Banzai (1984), which included Japanese, British, and America Marine Corps forces along with rules for Jungle Terrain, Random Reinforcements, and Scenarios M-X.
- Desert War (1985), which included French, and Italian forces as well as rules for Desert Terrain.

== Reception ==
In Issue 53 of the British wargaming magazine Perfidious Albion, Charles Vasey commented, "The game is quick, pretty, but it will not appeal to quite the same audience as did Squad Leader. It is not a game for the player who likes to see what is going on at all times." Vasey concluded, "I enjoyed the game which lacked a lot of the chess elements found in Squad Leader, but this could simply because I am a lazy swine who prefers to hussle rather than to plan."

Up Front was chosen for inclusion in the 2007 book Hobby Games: The 100 Best. Game designer Sandy Petersen explained, "If you can find a copy of Up Front, and you like tactical combat at all, check it out. Or even if you just like card games. In either case, you won't be disappointed. This is a game that surpasses its flaws, and turns some of them into strengths."

== Awards ==
At the 1989 James F. Dunnigan Awards, Up Front was a finalist in the category "Playability and Design".

== Other reviews and commentary ==
- BattlePlan #1 and #8
- Vae Victis #122 and #126 (in French)
- Tactics #26
