= War and Peace (game) =

1980 Napoleonic board wargame

- Original 1980 edition: Detail from "The Battle of Waterloo, 18 June 1815" by 19th-century English painter Denis Dighton
- Designers: Mark McLaughlin
- Publishers: Avalon Hill
- Publication: 1980
- Genres: Napoleonic

War and Peace, subtitled Game of the Napoleonic Wars: 1805–1815, is a board wargame published by Avalon Hill in 1980 that simulates ten years of Napoleonic wars.

== Description ==
War and Peace is a multi-player strategic war game that simulates the Napoleonic Wars from 1805 to 1815 through ten separate scenarios.

=== Components ===
- 4-piece 16" x 44" hex grid map scaled at 40 mi (64 km) per hex
- 1000 counters
- 24-page rulebook
- two playing aid cards
- two 6-sided dice

=== Scenarios ===
The game is divided into nine scenarios:

1. Austerlitz, 1805: Napoleon must overwhelm Mack's forces at Ulm, then march on Vienna and defeat the Russo-Austrian forces.
2. Jena to Friedland, 1806–07: Napoleon must overwhelm the Prussian forces in Saxony, but must then conquer the whole of Prussia by the following summer – the Russians can win by holding Warsaw or Konigsberg.
3. Wagram, 1809: A resurgent Austria invades Bavaria in conjunction with a German rising and a British landing at Walcheren Island. Napoleon, returning from Spain, must defeat all these and march on Vienna again.
4. Napoleon in Russia, 1812: Napoleon invades Russia with vast forces.
5. The War of Liberation, 1813: For the first time Napoleon has to take on Russia, Prussia and Austria at the same time.
6. Napoleon at Bay, 1814: With the tiny remnants of his army, Napoleon tries to keep the Allies out of Paris.
7. Waterloo, 1815: Napoleon attempts to defeat Wellington and Bluecher near Brussels while other Allied forces prepare to invade France. It is almost impossible for the French to win, so the rules recommend that players play the scenario twice, swapping sides to see who survives longest.
8. The Peninsular War, 1808–1814: The French Marshals try to capture every city from Spanish and Portuguese militia and partisans, the latter aided by the small British Army under Wellington.
9. Spain: 1811–1814: As above, but concentrating on the latter part of the war, the Allied liberation of Spain
10. Grand Campaign Game covering the entire period of 1805 to 1815.

Several more scenarios were published in various issues of The General.

=== Gameplay ===
Each turn represents a month of real time

- French Turn
  - Attrition Phase: Forces suffer losses to disease and desertion. Attrition is worse in winter and in Russia and Spain/Portugal, and for larger stacks.
  - Alliance Phase: Diplomacy allows nations to ally with one another.
  - Reinforcement Phase
  - Movement Phase
  - Combat Phase
- Non-French Turn
  - Attrition Phase
  - Alliance Phase
  - Reinforcement Phase
  - Movement Phase
  - Combat Phase
- Advance the Turn Marker

=== Movement and Combat ===
The game is built around infantry strength points representing around 5,000 men. They may only move if carried by a leader. Infantry have a movement allowance of three, but may roll for one to three extra forced march movement points, with failure and attrition loss more likely if the player tries to obtain two or three extra MPs. French troops have a die roll modifier, making them almost certain to obtain a single extra MP.

Combat is between adjacent hexes and by odds ratio (1:1, 3:2 or 2:1). Two dice are rolled, adjusted for leadership (generals are rated from 0 to 2, with Napoleon and Wellington both rated 3), morale and the chits pulled on the optional tactical matrix. Troops in adjacent hexes may join in subsequent rounds of combat, and are more likely to do so with a high-rated leader. Napoleon may commit the Imperial Guard, increasing the morale of his entire army to 3 but requiring him to take his Guard as losses.

Cavalry strength points can move independently on the map (up to ten movement points), and a defeated force suffers an extra strength point in loss if it has fewer cavalry SPs than the victor.

Fortresses and smaller cities may be assaulted, with the defender's strength doubled. They may also be besieged, in which case the attacker rolls a die each turn, with the required number increasing each turn until it reaches a maximum of 5 (the number is also added to the defender's attrition die roll). Sieges can thus continue indefinitely but are statistically likely to last 3 or 4 months.

=== Supply ===
A unit must trace supply to a major city through a chain of friendly strength points up to 3 hexes long.

=== Reinforcements ===
In the scenarios players receive scripted reinforcements reflecting historical deployments.

In the campaign game major powers purchase units from their force pools with production points (France receives extra points if Napoleon is in Paris). Britain may grant production points to other powers to influence diplomacy die rolls. A neutral power is exempt from attrition, allowing a defeated power to take a break from the war for a few years to rebuild her army.

Britain and Russia may be required by die roll to remove forces to fight the War of 1812 against the United States, or the ongoing Russo-Turkish Wars.

When France is defeated for the first time (by the Allies capturing Paris), Napoleon goes into exile on Elba. He rolls a die each turn, which may result in him being killed while attempting to return or returning to power for a second time.

=== Naval Rules ===
These are used only in the campaign game and consist of blockades of ports and skirmishes per sea zone (Baltic, North Sea, Atlantic and Mediterranean). There is a separate chart to see what happens when fleets clash. There is one naval leader, Britain's Horatio Nelson.

== Publication history ==
War and Peace was designed by Mark McLaughlin and published by Avalon Hill in 1980 in a boxed set with cover art by Denis Dighton.

After the closing of Avalon Hill, the rights to the game were acquired by One Small Step Games, which reprinted it in 2020, with a redrawn map and counters, and new scenarios of the Italian Campaign of 1796–7, the Egyptian Campaign of 1798 and the Marengo Campaign of 1800.

== Reception ==
In Issue 45 of the British wargaming magazine Perfidious Albion, Charles Vasey commented, "A manoeuvre game but far from complex. Lots of flavour ... Not overly long, [a] departure from [Avalon Hill] items." In the following issue, Vasey, Peter Lee and Roger Sandell thoroughly analyzed the game and then discussed it. Lee commented, "My dissatisfaction lies with the withdrawal rules governing field battles. In my view, it is simply too easy for an enemy force to withdraw from a battle ... What about the cavalry superiority and the surrounding of the enemy? Here these rules seem to be heavily emasculated ... Finally, in the game it is possible for an unsupplied force to survive for many turns despite attrition." Vasey replied, "I do not think that rationalisation will hold water ... I think the supply rules are quite reasonable and accurate. The cavalry and surround rules seem reasonable too ... The problem comes in the battles. As you point out the result is precious like the real thing ... The whole situation makes one feel that the use of Frederick the Great's rules would help." Sandell added, " I have some reservations about the 1805-1815 game as a simulation ... The production rules give no indication of the way constant war and its effect on French manpower led to the wearing down of the Grand Armee from its peak of 1805-1809 .... A multi-player version of the 1805-1815 game is given but I do not really see this as having much appeal to those who relish the wheeling and dealing aspect of multi-player games." Vasey summarized for all three, writing, "It is not all things to all men, as with most Avalon Hill games the accent is always on the game ... The package has plenty of play value with its many scenarios."

In Issue 26 of Phoenix, David Mylie notes "If you prefer strategic games or are interested in the Napoleonic period, War and Peace is well worth investigation."

War and Peace was chosen for inclusion in the 2007 book Hobby Games: The 100 Best. Fantasy author R. A. Salvatore commented, "I've played them all and that's the one that had me lying in bed for hours and hours, working up multi-turn strategies for blasting my enemy's supply lines, or creating a back-alley run to Paris. That's the game, with its simple elegance yet multitude of tactics, that offered to me exactly the right amount of information to juggle. Neither overwhelming nor underwhelming, too hot nor too cold, too big nor too small, too soft nor too hard, War and Peace fit this duck's bill."

== Awards ==
At the 1981 Charles S. Roberts Awards, War and Peace was a finalist for "Best Pre-Twentieth Century Game of 1980."

== Other reviews ==
- Fire & Movement No. 25
- Boardgamer Vol. 8, No. 3
- Casus Belli No. 17 (Oct 1983)
- Moves #52, p11-12
