= Area movement =

Game mechanic used in board games

- Publication: 1981; 45 years ago

Area movement is a game mechanic used in a board game. While most parlor games and the like have 'areas' of the board to move in, the term is used (particularly in wargaming) for those boards that represent a geographical area, but do not use a regular grid (usually of hexes or squares).

Area movement is a common feature in lighter wargames and some mass-market games, such as Axis and Allies, War at Sea and Risk.

Area movement breaks the terrain up and presents them as regions or areas, which are usually assumed to be completely controlled by one side. As such, they may only be an abstract administrative region, but often have borders conforming to natural obstacles such as mountain ranges or rivers. Movement is generally regulated by the number of areas a unit may move at one time, and the fact that movement can only occur through connected (adjacent) areas.

A variation of this mechanic is point-to-point movement. In some cases this is just area movement with a central point and the legal paths defined, instead of defining the region, as in Napoleon. In others it is actually used where the means of movement is important as in A House Divided.

The only difference between these two forms of movement is the nature of their movements; where regular area movement is grid aligned and point-to-point is isometric.

The first more serious simulation game to feature this type of movement was Storm Over Arnhem released in 1981 by Avalon Hill. Games directly copying this system included Thunder at Cassino and Turning Point: Stalingrad, both also published by Avalon Hill. A more recent example is Monty's Gamble: Market Garden released in 2003 by Multi-Man Publishing.
