= The Civil War 1861–1865 =

1981 American Civil War board wargame

- Designers: Eric Lee Smith
- Publishers: Victory Games
- Publication: 1983
- Genres: American Civil War

The Civil War 1861–1865 is a board wargame published by Victory Games in 1983 that simulates the American Civil War.

== Description ==
The Civil War 1861–1865 is a board wargame for two players in which one player controls Union forces and the other player controls Confederate forces. Counters represent generic Strength Points (SPs) rather than actual regiments, although SPs may be grouped into the historic armies such as the Army of the Potomac and the Army of Northern Virginia. The main map covers the historical extent of the American Civil War as far as Texas, and there is also an extension map of the American southwest as far as New Mexico for use with the optional "Far West" rules.

=== Gameplay ===
The main map is divided into three Theaters: East, West, and Trans-Mississippi. Command Points (CPs) are needed to for most of the game's essential functions such as moving units, constructing fortifications, and adding naval units. At the start of the turn, the two players must each prioritize the three Theaters as Primary, Secondary and Tertiary. The Primary Theater will receive the most CPs, the Tertiary will receive the least. Each player rolls two dice to determine how many CPs go to each Theater.

The two players then roll dice for initiative, and the winning player must take a number of actions equal to the difference in the two players' dice rolls. These actions can include expending CPs, mustering reinforcements, or bringing new leaders into play. Once the player has used their available actions, the other player gets the same opportunity. The players then roll for initiative again, and play continues as before. This cycle continues until both players have used up all their CPs in all three Theaters. Once that happens, the game turn ends, representing two months of the war in the spring, summer and fall, and four months of the winter.

If the players' initiative dice rolls are tied, both player receive extra CPs and roll again. On the fourth tie in the same game turn, the game turn ends immediately, even if one or both players still have unspent CPs.

=== Leaders ===
Leaders represent historical officers, and are an important part of the game. For SPs that do not have a leader, it takes one CP to move each single SP. For SPs with a leader, the cost of moving multiple SPs can be considerably lower. Each leader has a rank from 1 to 4 stars, which determines how many SPs the leader can command:

- 1 star = 2 SPs (a division)
- 2 stars = 6 SPs (a corps)
- 3 stars = one army (which can hold any number of SPs)
- 4 stars = any number of armies

Each leader is rated for initiative, with more energetic leaders requiring fewer CPs to move the SPs under their command. In addition, each general is rated for seniority relative to others of his rank, for combat ability, and, for army commanders, ability to reroll combat die rolls; some inept generals have negative ratings for the latter two. The game also includes cavalry generals, and a few Northern admirals.

Leaders can be sacked, promoted, demoted or die in battle.

=== Combat ===
Combat - which is generally costly and indecisive - takes place when both sides have SPs in the same hex. Both players roll a die and consult the Combat Results Table for the result.

=== Naval units ===
The Union player receives a separate pool of Naval CPs and can use those to build ironclad warships and transports, both ocean-going and for use on rivers. In contrast, the Confederate player can only draw from the usual bank of CPs to either build river combat ships or pay for the use of ocean-going privateers.

=== Economics ===
The Confederacy must also contend with economic problems. The production value of its cities is added to the import value of its ports, reduced by a variable amount due to the Union blockade. If the Union captures Southern cities and ports, this lowers the Southern production of goods, resulting in higher production costs and reduced movement rates.

=== Optional "Far West" play ===
The optional second map of the American Southwest is used in conjunction with several optional rules that add a flavor of the Old West to the game, including Texas Rangers and the use of various Indian tribes, including the so-called civilised Indians of Kansas and Oklahoma, and sacking of small towns to undermine the Confederacy.

=== Scenarios ===
The game comes with scenarios for each year of the war from 1861 to 1864 and a 19-turn campaign game covering the entire war. Turns 1–3 are 1861, 4-8 are 1862, 9–13 are 1863, and 14–17 are 1864 up to the federal election which saw Abraham Lincoln reelected. If the Union has earned sufficient VPs at this point to continue the war, the Campaign game will go two more turns to April 1865, when final victory is determined.

=== Victory conditions ===
The player with the most Victory Points (VPs) at the end of the scenario or Campaign game is the winner.

- The Union earns VPs by:
  - occupying cities in neutral (the three border states of Missouri, Kentucky and West Virginia) and Confederate states
  - and receives bonus VPs if all the cities in a state are occupied by the Union at the end of a turn.
- Confederate: Earns VPs by
  - occupying cities in the neutral states.
  - each time the Command Point Table is used to grant both sides command points (when initiative dice rolls are tied)
  - raiding USA merchant shipping
  - capturing Washington DC

== Publication history ==
In 1982, role-playing game publisher TSR unexpectedly took over wargame publisher Simulations Publications Inc. (SPI). Many SPI game designers soon left the company and were picked up by Avalon Hill, who formed them into a special wargames division called Victory Games. One of these designers, Eric Lee Smith, (creator of SPI's The Alamo: Victory in Death, 1981) designed The Civil War 1861–1865, which was published by Victory Games in 1983, featuring cover art by Ted Koller.

== Reception ==
In Issue 53 of the British wargaming magazine Perfidious Albion, Charles Vasey felt there was a certain tension created by the design of the game, commenting, "the design appears some what forced, yet has not been allowed to solidify down to a few possibilities; it is contrived and unnatural in style yet is far from either in result; it is certainly unromantic and modernist yet can one criticise it for that, if such is the accurate account; my real criticism is that after much struggling and striving I query whether you achieve much more realism from Civil War than you do from A House Divided." Vasey concluded, "I enjoyed the game but did feel it lacked something to be a true simulation, possibly the thought processes that occur in an Operational Studies Group game which approximate to the real concerns of generals (where are the best forage areas, how far can I march that large force etc etc) instead of 'How many CPs have I in the tertiary theatre.' Be that as it may, the game is well worth playing and you may find it much more to your taste."

In Issue 36 of the French games magazine Casus Belli, Yves Jourdain commented "This simulation from Victory Games isn't exactly a new game, but it's still interesting because it covers the entire war, both in space and time, and it's a fairly large game." Jourdain noted "The Confederate player can only 'win' by doing better than in historical reality, which frankly will be very difficult for him. In fact, the key to the problem lies in the western sector and the Union player's more or less rapid control of the Mississippi. It is he, by the creator's own admission, who will find the most interesting part of the game, because on the Confederate side, you spend most of your time building defenses." Jourdain concluded, "The simplicity of the rules for movement, combat, and supply make this simulation very accessible, especially since it can be played solo or with six players. I therefore recommend this game to fans of strategic simulations looking for a change of scenery."

Don del Grande wrote, "This is the best of the Civil War games I have seen; then again, I happen to like non-simplistic games (A House Divided) and non-complex games (War Between the States). The only trouble is in finding a 6 foot by 3 foot table to put It on."

In a retrospective review for The Board Gaming Way,, Tom Thornsen called this "one of the classic games to cover the entire American Civil War."

== Awards ==
At the 1983 Charles S. Roberts Awards, The Civil War 1861-1865 was a finalist in the category "Best Pre-20th Century Game".

== Other reviews and commentary ==
- Fire & Movement #37
