= Advanced Civilization =

Board game

- Advanced Civilization box cover
- Players: 2-8
- Setup time: 15 minutes
- Playing time: 5-12 hours
- Chance: Low
- Skills: Tactics, Strategy, Diplomacy

Advanced Civilization is an expansion game for the board game Civilization, published in 1991 by Avalon Hill. Ownership of the original game is necessary to play. While Civilization is in print as of November 2019 (by Gibsons Games), Advanced Civilization is not, following the dissolution of the original Avalon Hill game company and sale of all rights to titles to Hasbro in 1998.

== Features ==
Advanced Civilization enhances the game as much as it expands it, clarifying rules and simplifying certain aspects of the game. New features include:

- Assigning points to position on the Archaeological Succession Table (AST), rather than void a player from winning who has fallen behind in development
- Unlimited Civilization cards, omitting the fight to acquire advances before other players
- Seven new commodities cards, making the ever-important trade phase far more exciting
- Four new calamity cards
- Introduction of non-tradeable calamities
- Eight new Civilization cards, including a new group: religion
- Simplified trade to speed the game up
- Rules for 8 players
- Rules for late-comers and those that leave early

== Gameplay ==
Gameplay is broadly similar to Civilization. Most phases of play have minor alterations which simplify or rebalance play, but are still similar to the original.

Some of the major differences are in trade cards and calamities. There are more types of resources, as well as additional calamities. Calamities cannot be discarded or held, and a player who holds a calamity after trading becomes its primary victim, which encourages players to trade tradable calamity cards. The rules for trading are also simplified: each player in a trade must still trade three or more cards, but must only honestly state the number of cards being offered and the name of two of the cards, but not the total point value of the cards.

One of the biggest changes is in determining the victor. Rather than being the first person to reach the end of the AST, victory is determined by points. The largest share of points typically comes from civilization cards, followed by position on the AST; other resources that earn points are cities in play, trade cards, and tokens in treasury.

== Video game ==
Avalon Hill created a video game version of this game, called Avalon Hill's Advanced Civilization. The rules are slightly modified from the board version to make it suitable for computer play.

== Reviews ==
- Casus Belli #68
