= Nukewar =

1980 video game

- Developer: Microcomputer Games
- Publishers: NA: Avalon Hill; JP: Kiya Overseas Industry
- Platforms: Apple II, Atari 8-bit, PET, TRS-80, FM-7, Commodore 64, VIC-20
- Release: Apple, Atari, PET, TRS-80; NA: 1980; FM-7; JP: 1982; C64, VIC-20; NA: 1983
- Genre: Strategy

Nukewar is a 1980 video game by Avalon Hill for the Apple II, Atari 8-bit computers, Commodore 64, Commodore PET, FM-7, TRS-80, and VIC-20.

== Gameplay ==
Nukewar is a game of global thermonuclear war represented by text and sprites on the screen.

== Reception ==
In 1996, Computer Gaming World declared Nukewar the 135th-best computer game ever released.
