= Tyranno Ex =

Board game

Tyranno Ex is a board game published by Avalon Hill in 1990.

== Gameplay ==
Tyranno Ex is a prehistoric strategy game.

== Reviews ==
- Strategy Plus #4
- Games #116
- Dragon #194
