= U-Boat (game) =

1959 naval board wargame

- Designers: Charles S. Roberts
- Publishers: Avalon Hill
- Publication: 1959
- Genres: WWII Naval Combat

U-Boat is a board wargame published by Avalon Hill in 1959 that simulates World War II combat between a destroyer and a U-boat.

== Description ==
U-Boat is a board wargame for 2 players in which one player controls an Allied destroyer armed with depth charges that is trying to defend a convoy against a marauding U-boat; the other player controls a German U-boats armed with torpedoes that is trying to either reach the convoy or sink the destroyer. The game is played on a rectangular square grid map that is 18 squares by 14 squares. One short edge of the map is marked "Convoy".

=== Setup ===
The metal miniature or cardboard counter representing the destroyer is placed at the edge of the map marked "Convoy", and the miniature or counter representing the U-boat is placed on the opposite edge. Each player secretly rolls three dice; the totals (from 3 to 18) represent the number of depth charges the destroyer has, and the number of torpedoes the submarine has.

=== Gameplay ===
The destroyer can move from 1 to 4 squares each turn. Its first move must always be into the square straight ahead of its bow. It can then turn 45° to the left or to the right (or continue to move in a straight line.) The submarine can be on the surface or at a depth of 100, 200, 300 or 400 feet, and can move one square while submerged. On each turn, the U-boat can change its depth by 100 feet, and can turn 45° or 90°. Even while submerged, the submarine remains on the map, since the destroyer can "see" it with sonar. At the end of each U-boat turn, the U-boat captain must declare at what depth the submarine is located.

==== Depth charge attack ====
When the destroyer ends its turn close to the submarine, the destroyer captain can declare it is attacking with depth charges on the next turn. On the U-boat's turn, the captain can use an emergency speed of 2. There is a sonar "blind spot" underneath and behind the destroyer, so if the U-boat moves under the destroyer on its turn, the U-boat is removed from the board and a template representing all "blind" squares underneath and behind the destroyer is placed on the board. At the end of the U-boat's turn, the U-boat captain writes down the submarine's location, depth and direction of motion. On the destroyer's turn, the destroyer captain moves and can choose up to three of the squares on the template to drop depth charges into, and announces at what depth the depth charges will explode. If the destroyer successfully drops a depth charge into the correct square and at the correct depth, the U-boat is destroyed. If the depth charge explodes in an adjacent space, the submarine is damaged and must come to the surface.

==== Torpedo attack ====
The submarine can use its torpedoes against the destroyer. These can only be fired while the U-boat is on the surface or at a depth of 100 feet. At the end of the U-boat's turn, the U-boat captain chooses any square of the board to target (except for the square immediately in front of the destroyer that the destroyer must move into at the start of its turn) and writes how many torpedoes are targeting that square. The U-boat captain then announces that torpedoes are running. On the destroyer's turn, if the destroyer moves into the square targeted by torpedoes, a die is rolled for each torpedo and on a 1 or a 2, the destroyer is sunk.

=== Victory conditions ===
If the U-Boat reaches the side of the board marked "Convoy" and has at least three torpedoes left, the U-boat wins the game. Otherwise, whoever sinks the other is the winner.

=== Multiplayer ===
The game can be played with up to three destroyers and three submarines on each side, and subsequently can be expanded from 2 up to 6 players.

== Publication history ==
In 1958, Charles S. Roberts founded Avalon Hill Games Company, and the sixth game he published was U-Boat, released in 1959. The original game came with miniature metal figurines for the ships and submarines. Several problems with rules were identified, and a new edition was released in 1961. Two years later, in 1963, the company replaced the metal miniatures with cardboard counters.

The game proved a reliable seller and the July 1966 issue of the Avalon Hill house magazine The General featured a readers' contest using the U-Boat rules.

The game continued to be published until 1972.

== Reception ==
The writer David McDaniel, under the pseudonym Ted Johnstone, wrote in Issue 5 of Mest about U-Boat, noting that "the game is fast and furious."

In the May 1980 edition of The Space Gamer, Nick Schuessler and Steve Jackson noted that U-Boat and other naval games of the 1960s "In some respects ... rehashed old ground; in other ways, they were early signals of design problems to come. The naval games were drawn from a miniature format once again. However, just as it was impossible to lift ground combat from miniatures in Gettysburg [Avalon Hill, 1961], it proved impossible with naval miniatures. These naval games deepened the cleavage between miniatures and boardgaming, providing wargaming with its first big controversy: What is the real difference between miniatures and boardgames?"

In the 2016 book Zones of Control: Perspectives on Wargaming, Henry Lowood pointed out that U-Boat was one of the last Avalon Hill games to use a square grid, after designer Charles S. Roberts visited the RAND Corporation think tank and noticed that they used a hexagonal grid for their professional wargames, which reduced the amount of diagonal distortion in the maps.

== Other reviews and commentary ==
- Potomac Magazine (Washington Post Sunday supplement), 24 October 1971
- Pursue & Destroy #4
