= Desert War (game) =

Desert War is a 1989 board game supplement published by Avalon Hill for Up Front.

== Gameplay ==
Desert War is a supplement in which French and Italian forces are added along with desert‑theater rules, giving each nationality a 30‑card roster of infantry, support weapons, and light armored vehicles that plug into the base game's hand‑management and morale systems.

== Reception ==
Perfidious Albion felt that "All In all a valuable little addition to Up Front and which all Up Fronters should aquire."
