= History of the World (video game) =

1997 video game

- Developer: Colorado Computer Creations
- Publisher: Eidos Interactive
- Release: 1997

History of the World is a 1997 computer board game developed by Colorado Computer Creations and published by Eidos Interactive. It is an adaptation of Avalon Hill's History of the World board game. It was distributed on CD-ROM compatible with Windows 3.1 and Windows 95. It included support for play-by-e-mail, multiple human players at one computer, and AI opponents with nine configurable settings.

== Reception ==
Reception

Review scores
Publication	Score
Computer Gaming World	3.5/5
GameSpot	25%
PC Gamer (US)	55%
Computer Games Strategy Plus	3.5/5
AllGame	3/5

History of the World was a commercial failure, with fewer than 10,000 copies sold by November 1998. This contributed to the sale and closure of Avalon Hill that year.

In Computer Gaming World, Bob Proctor wrote, "History of the World is both a good game and a disappointment." He praised its accurate reproduction of the original board game, but heavily criticized its multiplayer features, and called its lack of online play "inexcusable" for a multiplayer title in 1997. Conversely, Scott Udell of Computer Games Strategy Plus called it "a very solid game; for multiplayer it's excellent, and even for solo players it provides a mostly satisfying (and fast — usually under an hour) gaming experience." He particularly praised its play-by-email feature. However, Udell noted bugs within History of the World, and felt that the game's video sequences "range from weak to painful".

In a negative review, PC Gamer US's William R. Trotter wrote that History of the World "looks and feels dated", and that it "quickly becomes boring." He believed that the charm of the board game had been lost in translation, and called its full motion video "the ugliest I've ever seen." Trotter summarized, "It gives die-hard fans a chance to play online, and that's the only reason I can think of for buying it." In a highly negative review, GameSpot called it an example of a poor board game adaptation, citing its clunky and dated user interface, poor performance, low-quality map, and lack of internet play.
