= Stocks & Bonds =

1964 board game

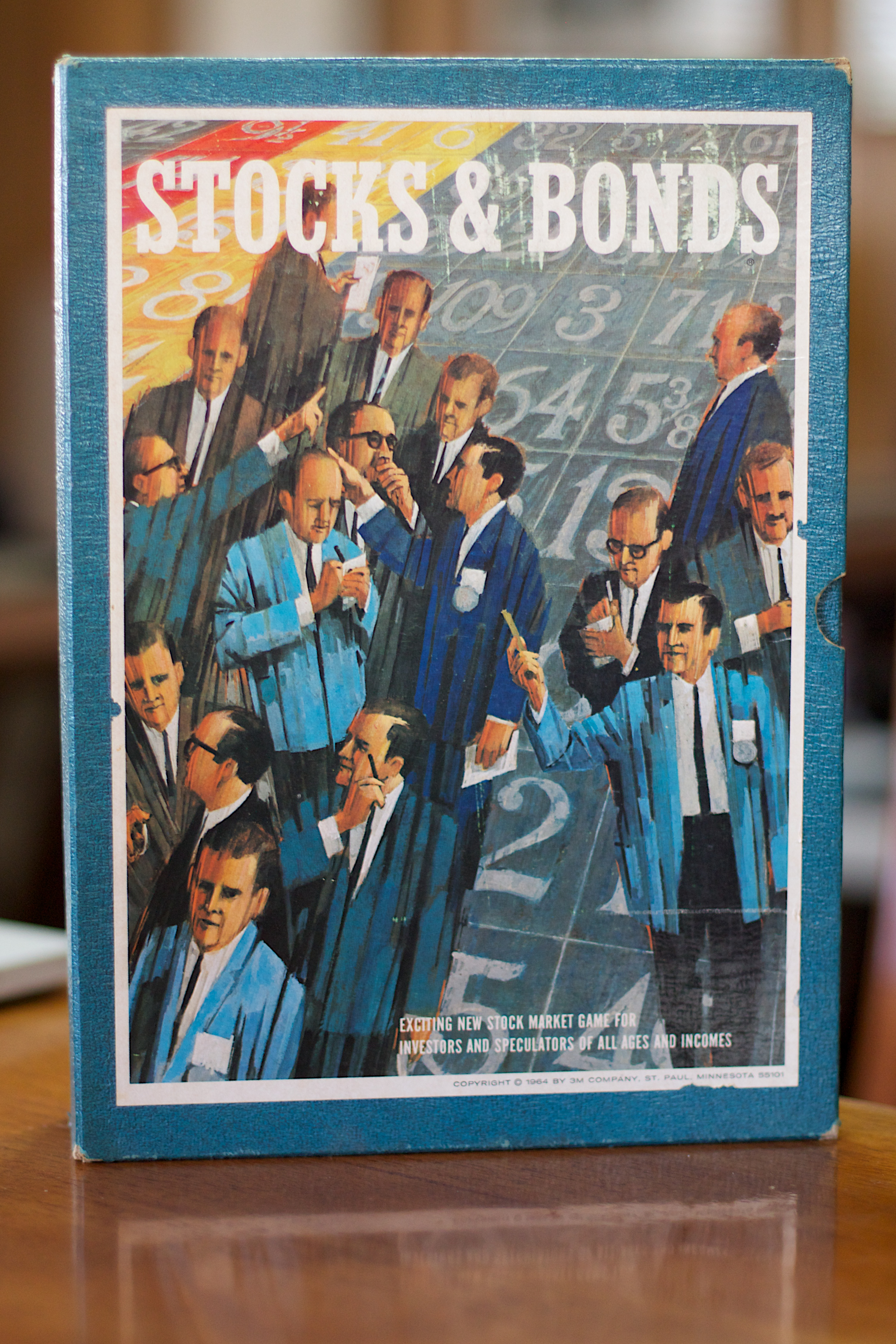
- Publishers: 3M; Avalon Hill
- Publication: 1964; 62 years ago
- Genres: Simulation game; Strategy game
- Players: 2-5
- Playing time: 60 minutes
- Age range: 12+

Stocks & Bonds is an economic strategy game published by 3M in 1964. The game is a simulation of the American stock market in which players buy and trade fictitious stocks to become the richest by the end of the game. A video game adaptation titled Computer Stocks & Bonds was released by Avalon Hill in 1982.

== Gameplay ==
Each round, players buy and sell the bonds or shares of ten different corporations and collect earnings from the previous round. At the start of each round, a card is drawn to determine whether the market is "Bull" (increasing) or "Bear" (decreasing). The value of each companies' share-values is determined each round by rolling a pair of dice and looking up the corresponding price fluctuation in either the Bear or Bull price tables. When the price of a stock reaches $150 or higher, the holders of the stock receive a second share for each they hold, the value of which are then halved.

There are ten rounds and the player with the most money at the end is the winner.

== Reception ==
Eric Solomon reviewed Stocks & Bonds for issue 43 of Games & Puzzles magazine, and criticized the game for its unoriginality and low realism. In The Playboy Winner's Guide to Board Games, Jon Freeman heavily compared the game to The Stock Market Game, preferring the fact that all transactions take place on paper but commenting that the rules can occasionally be ambiguous.

== Reviews ==
- The Guide to simulations/games for education and training
