= Dark Emperor =

Board game

Cover art by James Talbot, 1985

Dark Emperor is a fantasy combat board game published by Avalon Hill in 1985.

== Description ==
Dark Emperor is a two-player board game in which one player takes on the role of an evil necromancer and his vampires intent on claiming the wealth of Loslon, and the other player takes the part of the heroes trying to prevent this.

=== Components ===
The game has the following components:

- 16-page rulebook
- die-cut cardboard counters
- game board map of Loslon

=== Gameplay ===
All countries on the map begin as neutral. Both players try to recruit neutral countries to their cause, as well as three magical monsters, and six companies of mercenaries. If diplomacy fails, the Necromancer can use military force to conquer a country.

A player's kingdoms define total production of goods, which in turn defines how many soldiers can be supported.

=== Victory conditions ===
The Necromancer immediately wins if he conquers the Empire of Ahautsieron. The Kingdom immediately wins if the Necromancer is permanently slain by one of two magical weapons.

If neither side claims an immediate victory by the end of 14 turns, then the player with the most production from their kingdoms or conquered nations is the winner.

== Publication history ==
Dark Emperor was designed by Greg Costikyan, with artwork by James Talbot, and published by Avalon Hill in 1985.

== Reception ==
In the August 1986 edition of White Dwarf (Issue #80), Ashley Shepherd complimented the unusual map of Loslon, saying "The completely different geography of this world changes all your conceptions of how to fight." While he admired the rules for movement, diplomacy and magic, he didn't like the rules for reinforcement, noting that "there can be a lot of fiddly counting of hexes to determine taxes." He also thought that the Combat Table was "rather inflexible." Shepherd concluded "it works very well, facing players with real decisions of strategy, even if their battlefield tactics are at the whim of the dice."

In the December 1986 edition of Adventurer (Issue 5), Alex Bamford liked "Avalon's usual high quality of components," and thought the map "is what lifts this game out of the ordinary." He noted that "the rules of the game are well written, easy to understand and contain some excellent ideas." While Bamford found the game was "fascinating strategically," he didn't like the taxation game mechanics, which he called "a time consuming and fiddly business." He concluded with a strong recommendation, saying, "Dark Emperor is the most enjoyable and interesting two player game of Fantasy Warfare that I have seen in a long time. It is exciting, demanding, has lasting interest and very clear rules."

In a retrospective review of Dark Emperor in Black Gate, John ONeill said "Dark Emperor invites players to play either the Necromancer Padrech dar Choim, bane of all that lives, with his vampire host and his ability to raise the undead to do his bidding, or a human king, who must rally the kingdoms of the world to fight him. Typical for Avalon Hill the game components, including the map and counters, are beautiful, and if you’re an old-school gamer like me, they look extremely inviting when you open the box."

== Reviews ==
- Casus Belli #39 (Aug 1987)
- The V.I.P. of Gaming Magazine #5 (Sept./Oct., 1986)
- Isaac Asimov's Science Fiction Magazine v10 n9 (1986 09)
