= History of the World (board game) =

1991 board game

- Box of the 1993 Avalon Hill edition of History of the World
- Other names: Empire
- Designers: Gary Dicken; Steve Kendall; Phil Kendall
- Illustrators: Charles Jarboe; Steve Kendall; Jason Spiller; David Walker
- Publishers: List: Ragnar Brothers (1991); Compendium Games (1992); Welt der Spiele (1993); Gibsons Games (1993); Avalon Hill (1993); Hasbro (2001); Ragnar Brothers (2009); Z-Man Games (2018)
- Publication: 1991; 35 years ago
- Players: 3–6
- Playing time: 135–270 minutes
- Age range: 12+

History of the World (often abbreviated HotW) is a board game designed by Ragnar Brothers and originally published in 1991. It is played by up to six players across various epochs, each player playing a different empire every round to have the greatest score at the end of the game by conquering other players' regions of the board.

== History ==
The first edition of History of the World by Ragnar Brothers was released in 1991 and featured a hand-made cloth map instead of a board. It sold out in a few weeks, according to game designer Steve Kendall. Following this, alternative language editions were released by various publishers. In 1993, a new edition was published by Avalon Hill, who updated the visual design of the game and added a system of event card management. After Avalon Hill was purchased by Hasbro in the early 2000s, History of the World was re-released as a big box game. Ragnar Brothers released a revised version of the game, A Brief History of the World, in 2009. The most recent edition was released in 2018 by Z-Man Games.

== Gameplay ==
The game is played in seven rounds known as epochs (6 epochs in the 2009 edition, and 5 epochs in the 2018 edition), which correspond to different historical periods. At the beginning of every epoch, each player–starting with the player with the lowest score and ending with the player with the highest–draws an Empire Card and assumes the role of that empire for the round. Each empire has advantages and disadvantages based on the order in which it appears in an epoch as well as its starting location on the world map, number of armies, ability to access certain lands by sea, and whether or not it possesses a capital; empires without capitals are known as "Marauders" and gain an additional point when they reduce an opponent's structure.

During each empire's turn, its allocated units are placed on the board beginning from its capital or starting space and proceeding through contiguous areas and controlled seas or oceans. Occupation of empty territory is automatic, while dice-based combat rules are applied if a unit is placed in an area already occupied by another player's forces. If a player wins or ties a battle in a territory containing either a capitol, city, or monument, then the territory is "reduced" by turning it into a city (if it is a capitol) or removing it from the game (if it is a city or monument).

At the end of each player's turn, they are given a score based on how much control they have of regions of the board (known as "Areas") and how many capital, cities, and monuments they possess. The remains of players' empires never move again, but remain on the board for the rest of the game until they are conquered or destroyed by other empires. Players are also given "Greater Events" and "Lesser Events" cards at the beginning of the game, which can be used throughout to gain certain advantages.

== Reception ==
In 1994, the Avalon Hill edition of History of the World won the Origins Award for "Best Pre-20th Century Boardgame of 1993".

In Issue #78 of Casus Belli, Bruno Faidutti briefly reviewed the Avalon Hill edition, criticizing the graphic design for being plain and unappealing. This point was restated by Faidutti in a longer review for Issue #80, though he went on to praise the game for its method of distributing empires in each era and point system, as well as the additional number of pawns in the Avalon Hill edition compared to the Gibson Games edition.

In a review of the Hasbro re-release, The Wargamer called it "[...] a marvelous, energetic and extremely fun to play game that lets players of all ages and skill levels conquer the world."

In a review of the 2018 edition for ICv2, contributor William Niebling rated the game 5/5 stars and praised its updated graphics and component quality. He concluded that "Thanks to the updates, gameplay is brisk, decisions are meaningful, luck is a factor but not an overwhelming one, and everything feels well balanced." Matt Jarvis, writing for Tabletop Gaming, gave the 2018 edition a very positive review for its trimmed gameplay, component quality and design, and its "subver[sion of] the classic civilisation format," concluding that "Playful without feeling frivolous, History of the World is enormous fun."

The game's concept of scoring based on level of control in a region was cited by designer Jason Matthews as an influence on Twilight Struggle.

== See also ==
- History of the World (video game)
