= Avalon Hill's Advanced Civilization =

1995 video game

- Developer: Avalon Hill
- Publisher: Avalon Hill
- Producer: Donald Greenwood
- Designer: Jim Synoski
- Programmer: Jim Synoski
- Artist: Joe Amoral
- Composer: Eric Heberling
- Platform: MS-DOS
- Release: EU: 1995; NA: March 23, 1996
- Genre: Turn-based strategy
- Modes: Single-player, Multiplayer

Avalon Hill's Advanced Civilization is a computer edition of the Advanced Civilization board game (the Civilization board game including the expansion to that game called Advanced Civilization). Both the board and computer game portray the same basic concept: the players manage ancient Mediterranean civilizations in an effort to move them from the early Bronze Age to beyond the Iron Age. It was published in 1995, shortly before Avalon Hill was bought out by Hasbro in 1998.

== Gameplay ==
The gameplay involves a map of the Mediterranean Sea and surrounding lands, where each player controls one civilization chosen from a set of nine: Africa, Asia, Assyria, Babylon, Crete, Egypt, Illyria, Italy (also named Iberia) and Thrace. Players move population units across the board, taking over territories and competing with their opponents for the most sought after land.

Once the population reaches a sufficient size, the player can congregate the units into cities. These cities can later be attacked for valuable plunder and to deal a blow to the opponents' chances of winning. The primary source of damage to players' civilizations comes from calamities rather than warfare. Calamities are somewhat under players' control, and can be managed by purchase of appropriate tools.

Building cities allows the players' civilization to produce commodities such as iron, salt, wine, bronze and spices. For each city the player has, they may draw a card from a commodity card deck, numbered one through nine. Those who have the least cities draw first. The more commodities the players' civilization produces, the more valuable the types of commodities that can be produced. Hidden within each commodity deck are also one or two calamities, like earthquake, famine, barbarian hordes or civil war, each of which seriously damages the players' population and destroys their cities. All commodity and calamity cards have identical backs, for trading face down. Some calamities are not tradeable. Most tradeable calamities have consequences to other players and generally the player who traded the calamity is exempt from being chosen.

Once the players' civilization accumulates enough commodities, they can trade them with their opponents in order to corner the market on a particular commodity and increase its value. By creating sets of two or more of the same commodity, the value of the commodity increases since the set is worth the imprinted number (1 to 9) times the square of the number of cards the set consists of. To trade, the player offers someone three (or more) of their commodity cards in exchange for three (or more) of theirs. The player must trade the same number of cards. Notably, only two of the trade cards need to be true for a valid trade to take place, which often discourages trading more than three cards.

Once the player collects enough commodities, they can spend them to purchase tools, which range from pottery or astronomy to democracy or monotheism. By acquiring these tools, players' civilizations gain victory points. The tools also give each civilization particular advantages during the gameplay. Tools are divided into categories such as Science, Craft, and Civics. Purchasing a tool of one category normally entitles the player to a discount to further purchases in that category and often also entitles the player to a discount to the purchase of specific tools. Some tools have prerequisites for purchase.

By collecting useful tools and maintaining as many cities as possible on the board, the players' civilization advances through the ages. At the end of each turn, civilizations with enough cities and tools in the appropriate categories are allowed to advance along the turn track, the Archaeological Succession Table (AST). Different civilizations have slightly different entry requirements to the spaces on the AST. A civilization unfortunate enough to end the turn with no cities at all will go backwards on the AST. Once one or more players have reached the end of the AST (for which 2000 victory points and 5 cities are needed), the game ends and the winner is decided based on a calculation of victory points. The majority of victory points come from purchase of tools and progress along the AST. Cities and stock at the end of the game provide a minor boost to victory points, sometimes sufficient to decide a close-fought game.

== Reception ==
Reception

Review scores
Publication	Score
Computer Gaming World	3/5
PC Games	D

The game was commercially unsuccessful, and sold fewer than 20,000 units by April 1998.

Computer Gaming World's Bob Proctor wrote, "This game is perfect for those who play the board game, or for those who don't mind long, involving strategy play." While he found the game to be "a good translation of the original" in its single-player mode, he found its multiplayer options limited.
