= Guerilla (card game) =

Card-based wargame

- Cover art by Stephen Langmead
- Designers: Neal Schlaffer
- Illustrators: Stephen Langmead
- Publishers: Avalon Hill
- Publication: 1994
- Genres: Latin American insurgency

Guerilla [sic] is a card-based wargame published by Avalon Hill in 1994 that simulates the attempted overthrow of an unnamed South American government by rebels.

== Description ==
Guerilla is a card game for 3–6 players using a deck of 128 cards.

=== Set up ===
Eight cards are dealt to each player. Each players secretly draws a random Loyalty marker, which indicates if they'll be supporting Government or Rebel. If a player has a Complex card in their hand (TV station, barracks, etc.), the player must put it down on the table. Troop and leader cards have both Government and Rebel aspects.

Each player then sorts their cards into groups, provided no group contains more than one leader and three units, or one Complex, one unit and/or one leader. These are displayed face up in front of the player. Players then draw enough cards from the deck to bring their hand back up to eight.

=== Gameplay ===
Each player, on their turn, can take only two Actions that can include (in order):

1. Withdraw: Remove cards from the table and return them to hand, one Action per card.
2. Attack: Use one or both Actions to attack.
3. Deploy: Place new cards on the table, one Action per card.
4. Trade: The active player can trade cards in their hand with other players, costing one Action per card.
5. Discard/Repair: As many as 4 cards can be discarded from the player's hand and replaced with new cards from the deck, costing one Action. Damage to a Complex can be repaired at the cost of an Action and a die roll — the damage is reduced by half the die roll.
6. Draw new cards: Refill the hand back to eight cards, at the cost of an Action.

In addition to fighting other troops, players attempt to take and hold the Complexes, each of which have in-game advantages. For example, the Bridge allows withdrawal or deployment of a group without using an action; the ''Banco de Nationale allows an extra Action per turn.

=== Combat ===
To resolve combat, both the attacker and defender add up the strength of their units plus the Leader's strength plus a die roll. The losing side eliminates a number of units equal to the difference in the totals. For example, if the attacker's units had a combined strength of 10 plus a Leader Strength of 3 plus a die roll of 3 for a total 16, and the defender's units had a combined strength of 8 plus a Leader strength of 4 plus a die roll of 6 for a total of 18, the defender would win, and the attacker would lose 2 units (18 - 16 = 2).

=== Special cards ===
Players can use special yellow and black cards to enliven play. For example, an Assassin card can be used to try to kill an enemy leader, unless the affected player counters with a Bodyguard card. An Arms Cache card allows two attacks for a single Action point. The Revolution card forces any two opponents to switch their secret allegiance drawn at the start of the game to the opposite faction.

=== Victory conditions ===
Once all cards in the deck have been drawn, the game goes into sudden death. A Sudden Death tile is turned to "9". Play continues, but at the end of each player's turn, the player rolls a die. If it is equal to or greater than the Sudden Death tile, the game ends. If the die roll is less than the Sudden Death tile, the tile is turned to reduce it by 1, and play continues.

At the end of the game, the Rebel and Government factions add up their scores for enemy units eliminated plus complexes controlled. All players who supported the faction with the largest score keep their total individual score, while the players supporting the losing side have their scores halved — the highest individual score wins the game.

== Publication history ==
Guerilla was designed by Neal Schlaffer and published by Avalon Hill in 1994, with cover art by Stephen Langmead.

== Reception ==
In Issue 88 of the British wargaming magazine Perfidious Albion, Charles Vasey commented, "The style of Gerilla is very interactive with a lot of Chaos but always within the confines of surprisingly accurate simulation of counter-insurgency." Vasey didn't like the ability to switch sides, pointing out, "I still find the mystery faction loyalty (and changing loyalty) a bit gamey, but I suppose in the old coup-ridden Latin America it might make sense." Vasey also found issues with the excessive bookkeeping. Despite this, Vasey concluded, "In all a very good piece of work on achieving a good level of fun and simulation. It would be hard to better this with the standard game format."

In Issue 15 of Berg's Review of Games, Richard Berg called this "a game that doesn't aspire to being much more than an hour or two of fun. Within that ascetically minimalist approach, it manages to achieve much of what it sets out to accomplish." Berg pointed out, "Guerilla is basically beer-and-pretzels stuff ... Thrilling, incisive and illuminating it ain't. But that's not what Mr. Shlaffer intended. (At least one hopes that’s not what he intended.) He wants you to have an hour or two of fun and a few laughs. Guerilla provides those, and it provides them in fairly classy manner." Berg concluded by calling this "An unusual subject handled with some flair. Fun, if not overly involving."

In Issue 1 of Zone of Control, Rick Swan liked the quality of the components, and found the rulebook "a model of tight writing and sensible organization." Swan liked the game's speed, noting, "With no charts to check, no numbers to juggle and no convoluted systems to interpret, players can concentrate on their cards." Swan did warn that some players would hate the possibility of having their Loyalty changed mid-game. "Players who resist the idea of having the rug pulled out from under them should probably pass on Guerilla." Swan also pointed out that "Luck, in fact, plays a crucial role in Guerilla, too much, I'd guess, for those more attuned to chess than roulette." Swan concluded, "Guerilla is hardly a triumph of the intellect, and it won't be mistaken for a history lesson. But only a curmudgeon could complain about the play value. The streamlined turn sequence moves the game along at a brisk pace ... Guerilla's about as long as an episode of Mission: Impossible. And it's just as much fun."
