= Mustangs (game) =

Mustangs is a 1991 board game published by The Avalon Hill Game Company.

== Gameplay ==
Mustangs is a game in which an air‑combat game has differently rated aircraft maneuver, turn, and attack under strict speed and initiative limits, with performance differences shaping how each plane survives, strikes, or breaks away.

== Reception ==
Perfidious Albion felt that "I have mixed feelings about it [...] It is an entry-level game and one must bear this in mind before ripping it to shreds, and as such it works quite well indeed."

== Reviews ==
- Casus Belli #77
