= Patton's Best =

Patton's Best is a World War II solitaire wargame. It was designed by Bruce Shelley and published by Avalon Hill in 1987.

The game puts the player in command of an M4 Sherman tank belonging to George Patton's 4th Armoured Division in Northern Europe. The game is played on an abstract map which portrays hypothetical territory in Normandy, several tables and a depiction of the tank, on which the player puts cardboard counters to indicate the actions performed by each member of the crew, the kind of ammunition currently loaded in the main gun, the current state of hatches, turret and gun orientation, and other information.

A game is played in turns, each one corresponding to 15 minutes of real time: when random die rolls indicate that combat occurs the action switches to combat rounds, during which the player directs the actions of each crew member (driver, assistant driver, gunner, loader and commander himself) moving the tank and firing its weapons, while the randomly determined enemy reacts with actions determined by random die rolls influenced by what the player does. The player wins by earning victory points by knocking out enemy units and capturing enemy territory, and preventing the enemy doing so. After a game is over the player has a chance to improve his tank, switching to a later or improved model, and to improve the skills of his crew.

The game is quite detailed in terms of single-tank warfare simulation, including rules for machine guns, smoke deployment, target acquisition, enemy spotting and crew casualties.

== Reviews ==
- Casus Belli #43 (Feb 1988)
