= Lawrence Pinsky =

American physicist

Lawrence Pinsky is an American physicist specializing in relativistic heavy ion physics, and currently the John & Rebecca Moores Professor at the University of Houston.

Pinsky is also a licensed lawyer who deals in international patent law. He is one of the inventors of the board game Blitzkrieg. He also designed several World War II wargames.
