= Computer Football Strategy =

1983 video game

- Developer: Microcomputer Games
- Publisher: Avalon Hill
- Platforms: Atari 8-bit, Commodore 64, CP/M, TRS-80
- Release: Commodore 64: NA: 1983; EU: 1983
- Genre: Sports (football)
- Modes: Single-player; Multiplayer

Computer Football Strategy (also known as Football Strategy) is a 1983 sports video game that simulates the National Football League from a strategic point of view. It was developed for the Commodore 64 and the Atari 8-bit computers. Many retired professional football players have been noted to be content while recapturing their former heroics on this computer game.

== Gameplay ==

The basic choice of teams span from the 1966 Green Bay Packers (the winners of Super Bowl I) to the 1982 Washington Redskins (the winners of Super Bowl XVII - the most recent Super Bowl as of the game's release). The game uses a top-down perspective in order to properly simulate the football field. The game shows the football field as a small, thin strip divided into ten-yard lines. Four basic graphics (the blue players playing the role as the defense and the black players playing the role as the offense) are considered to be "simulated American football players." A notable criticism of the game is that having X's and O's would have been more realistic (because coaches use these in real-life football to write playbooks for the team players).

Twenty different plays can be called from the line of scrimmage with ten different outcomes depending on the defensive alignment. The display shows a minimal coverage of the action; with no movement by either the quarterback or the wide receivers. A complete lack of "hurry-up" offences means that each pass takes 15 seconds of game time to complete.

== Reception ==
Football Strategy was a runner up in the category of "Best Computer Sports Game" at the 4th annual Arkie Awards.
