= The War at Sea =

1975 WWII naval board wargame

- 1975 first edition, Jedko Games; Artwork is a stylized photograph of the sinking of the Bismarck
- Designers: John Edwards
- Publishers: Gametime Games
- Publication: 1975
- Genres: WWII naval

The War at Sea is a strategic World War II board wargame published by the Australian game publisher Jedko Games in 1975 that simulates naval warfare during the Battle of the Atlantic. A revised second edition was published by Avalon Hill in 1976, and a third edition was released by L2 Design Group in 2007.

== Description ==
The War at Sea is a board wargame in which one player controls Allied naval forces (Great Britain and Russia), and the other player controls Axis naval forces (Germany and Italy). United States starts as a neutral spectator, and both players have a chance to bring America to their side.

=== Components ===
The rules are covered in 3 pages. The mounted map board depicts the Atlantic Ocean and Mediterranean Sea, as well as a crude outline of parts of the coasts of the United States, Brazil, Europe and North Africa. The map is divided into six zones: North Atlantic, South Atlantic, North Sea, Baltic Sea, Mediterranean Sea and Barents Sea. There are nine naval bases — England, Leningrad, Russia and Malta for the Allies; and Germany, France and Italy for the Axis. The naval base in Brazil is neutral and can be used by either side as a refuge for one turn. The American naval base belongs to neither player at the start of the game; both players have a chance to bring the Americans to their side. (In the 2nd edition published by Avalon Hill, United States starts the game as part of the Allies.) Each naval base has a number that indicates its repair capability. For example, Germany and England can both repair 8 damage points per turn, while Italy can only repair 4 points and Leningrad can only repair 1 point.

117 counters represent fleets of capital ships, U-boat submarines, Allied convoys, and aircraft of the period. All the capital ship fleets are free to sail to any of the areas on the map, except the two Russian counters, which can never leave the Baltic, and most of the Italian counters, which cannot leave the Mediterranean. Each fleet and U-boat counter has three numbers representing its attack factor, its defence factor and its speed.

The French port is not available to the Axis until Turn 2, and the Russian ports do not become available to the Allies until Turn 3.

=== Movement ===
All ships start the turn in a friendly base. From there, each ship can be moved into a zone adjacent to the base. If the zone is "friendly" (controlled by the moving player), then the player can attempt to move the ship into a second zone. This requires a die roll. If the die roll is less than the ship's speed (indicated on the ship's counter), the move to the second zone succeeds. If the move fails, the ship must return to base for the remainder of the turn.

The Allied player always moves first, followed by the Axis player.

=== Combat ===
Combat happens when opposing fleets occupy the same zone, and is resolved by rolling a number of six-sided dice equal to the attack factors of the ships or submarines that the player has chosen to use against one target. If a 5 is rolled, the target is disabled, and must return to port at the end of the combat round. For each 6 rolled, the attacking player rolls one die again; the number rolled represents the damage that is inflicted on the target. When cumulative damage exceeds the target's defence factor, the ship is sunk.

Combat follows this sequence:

1. The Allied player targets any U-boats in the zone.
2. Both players resolve air attacks, which are revealed simultaneously. Aircraft from aircraft carriers must attack counters in the same zone (using the aircraft carrier's attack factor.) Land-based aircraft can attack up to three different targets in certain zones and in ports.
3. Both players resolve ship combat in the disputed zone, revealing which fleet and U-boat counters will be attacking which fleet counters simultaneously. After one round of combat, both players can choose to stay and fight another round, or can withdraw to a friendly port. The opposing player can pursue and try to inflict further damage on the withdrawing force without any return fire.

Convoys cannot be attacked until all other Allied surface ships in the same zone have been disabled or damaged.

If, at the end of combat, there are only ships of one player in a zone, that player controls the zone.

At the end of each turn, all ships return to a friendly or neutral base, and repairs up to the port's capability can be done.

=== Victory conditions ===
At the end of each turn, control of zones may or may not result in Victory Points. For example, if the Axis player controls the North Sea at the end of a turn, it is worth 3 Victory Points. However, the Allies gain no Victory Points for controlling the North Sea.

The Allies also gain Victory Points for safely delivering convoys to either England (1 point) or Russia (3 points).

At the end of the game, which lasts 8 turns, the player with the most Victory Points is the winner.

== Variations ==
Numerous variants were released by Avalon Hill in The General, Avalon Hill's house magazine.

== Publication history ==
The War at Sea was designed by John Edwards and published by the Australian game company Jedko Games in 1975. Two years later, Avalon Hill purchased the rights to the game, and after some revisions, published a second edition with the shortened title War at Sea. A year later, Avalon Hill used the same rules for a sequel, Victory in the Pacific. In 2007, L2 Design Group published a third edition.

== Tournaments ==
War at Sea has been played in many competitive tournaments, including the World Boardgaming Championships, PrezCon, and via play-by-email.

== Reception ==
In his 1977 book The Comprehensive Guide to Board Wargaming, Nick Palmer noted that the playing time of this game was only an hour, and called it "a pleasant little contest without being a full-fledged wargame in the more sophisticated sense." In his 1980 sequel, The Best of Board Wargaming, Palmer described War at Sea and its sister Victory In The Pacific as "excellent introductory fare to entice newcomers into the hobby" with the former having a mere four pages of rules. He criticised the mechanism whereby damaged ships “sprout wings” (albeit affected by the ship’s individual speed factor) and return to port as “the most outrageous element in a pair of games with scanty claims to realism”. However, the games offer “light relief and fast movement” although they can also be played as “deadly serious contests of logic and mathematics”; the games are “primarily for beginners or statisticians, but also quite good as an occasional change from weightier things”. He praised the “honesty in advertising” by which War At Sea admits that it is only loosely a “simulation” in that it is based on “historical data” about ship design and is intended as a fun introductory game. He gave the game a high rating for excitement (70%) but a derisory 5% for realism.

In Issue 36 of the British wargaming magazine Perfidious Albion, Myles Robertson noted the lack of historicity of the game, saying, "Any connection between War at Sea and historical reality is unintentional and purely coincidental. This does not mean to say, however, that the game is rubbish. Its is a fun game." Robertson concluded, "All in all a very enjoyable game ... it is good fun, something which is not found in too many games nowadays, and I would highly recommend it to all"

In the 1980 book The Complete Book of Wargames, game designer Jon Freeman called this "the simplest real wargame on the market and ideal for introducing newcomers to the hobby." Freeman concluded by giving the game an Overall Evaluation of "Good", saying, "Although it's no great shakes as a simulation, and the bane of adherents of the SPI school of realism-by-complexity, it's a pleasant little game."

In The Guide to Simulations/Games for Education and Training, Martin Campion commented on its use as an educational aid, saying, "In spite of its historical distortions and lack of realism, War at Sea is some help in seeing the situation in the Atlantic and shows why the British feared the small German Fleet." Unlike other critics, Campion did not think this was a good introduction to wargaming, pointing out that "its system is not even distantly related to the systems used in more complex games."

== Other reviews and commentary ==
- Casus Belli #16 (Aug 1983)
- Campaign #76 & #103
- Fire & Movement #62
- Panzerfaust #70
- Games & Puzzles #61
