= Frederick the Great (game) =

Board wargame

Strategy & Tactics #49, which contained the pull-out game Frederick the Great

Frederick the Great, subtitled "The Campaigns of The Soldier King 1756–1759", is a board wargame published by Simulations Publications Inc. (SPI) in 1975 that simulates several of the campaigns of Frederick the Great in Central Europe during the Seven Years' War. When SPI ran into financial difficulties, they sold the rights to the game to Avalon Hill, who produced a second edition in 1982.

== Description ==
Frederick the Great is a two-player game in which one player tries to recreate the successes Frederick the Great and his British-Hanoverian allies enjoyed despite fighting against numerically superior armies, and the other player controls the forces of the Coalition (Austria, France, Russia, Sweden, and the Holy Roman Empire.) The rules emphasize the importance of leadership and battlefield maneuvers. For instance, combat units cannot move without a leader.

=== Components ===
The original SPI ziplock bag edition of the game includes:

- 21" x 32" paper hex grid map scaled at 22 km (13.5 mi) per hex
- 200 die-cut counters
- rules booklet

The SPI boxed edition includes a small six-sided die. In the Avalon Hill edition, the number of counters is increased to 240, and the paper map has been replaced with a mounted map.

=== Gameplay ===
The player controlling Frederick's forces does the following phases (with the exception of the other player's "forced march" and Attrition phases):

- Reinforcement Phase
- Morale Recovery Phase
- Depot Creation Phase
- Phasing Player March Phase
- Non-phasing Player Forced March Phase
- Combat Phase
- Siege Resolution Phase
- Non-phasing Player Attrition Phase.

Then the Coalition player runs through the same phases — this completes one turn, which is one fortnight in game time.

=== Scenarios ===
The first (SPI) game comes with four scenarios, each representing one of Frederick's annual campaigns during the Seven Years' War:

- 1756: Invasion of Saxony (10 game turns)
- 1757: Invasion of Bohemia (18 turns)
- 1758: Invasion of Moravia (18 turns)
- 1759: The Defense of Berlin (18 turns)

Cover of Avalon Hill's 2nd edition, with cover art by Rodger B. MacGowan, 1982

The Avalon Hill edition added another three scenarios.

== Publication history ==
Frederick the Great was designed by Frank Davis and Edward Curran, with graphic design by Redmond A. Simonsen, and was published by SPI in 1975 as a pull-out game in Strategy & Tactics #49. SPI also released it packaged in a "flatpack" box. It was not a bestseller for SPI, failing to crack SPI's Top Ten Games list after it was published. In a 1977 poll conducted by SPI to determine the most popular wargames in North America, Frederick the Great only placed 119th of 202 games.

In 1981, SPI ran into financial problems, and sold several of their intellectual properties, including Frederick the Great, to Avalon Hill. Joe Balkoski redeveloped the game but made mainly cosmetic changes, such as giving the leader counters historical names instead of numbers. Balkoski also added three new scenarios to the game covering the 1760–1762 period. Avalon Hill released the revised edition in 1982 with new cover art by Rodger B. MacGowan.

== Reception ==
In the 1977 book The Comprehensive Guide to Board Wargaming, Nicholas Palmer noted some of the innovative features of the game: "Defenders hole out in fortresses and get besieged, leaders inspire the troops, and prisoners can be taken."

In the 1980 book The Best of Board Wargaming, Graham Buckell called this "a game where supply and maneuvre are more important than battle. Battles are used to punish an opponent's errors, assuming of course you have not underestimated his strength." However, Buckell did not like the high level of luck needed to win the game, pointing out that "Decisive battles can turn on one die-roll." He also found the 1756 campaign badly biased in favor of Frederick. Although he thought the others more balanced, he warned that "The results can be drastically affected by a thoughtless move."

In the 1980 book The Complete Book of Wargames, game designer Jon Freeman noted that "opinion [of wargamers] is quite divided on Frederick the Great. It is arguably one of the finest simulations on the market. However, since the object of the game is to avoid combat, most people find six to eight hours of that sort of thing quite boring." However, Freeman called the game "not only a superb battle of wits, but it is also an excellent evocation of eighteenth-century warfare." Freeman concluded by giving the game an Overall Evaluation of "Good", saying "While it is by no means to everyone's taste, those looking for enlightenment and its special kind of mind-boggling challenge need look no further."

In Issue 31 of Moves, Roy Schelper called this "a fascinating game that presents numerous challenges to both players." He called the graphics "both good and bad. The counters are bright and easy to read [...] the board, alas, is very drab." He warned players that "Frederick the Great is a harsh master. It will punish those who attempt to deny the history which it recreates, but to those who attend to its lessons, this game will offer new insights into one of the more incredible annals of military history."

In The Guide to Simulations/Games for Education and Training, Martin Campion called the game "remarkably faithful to the spirit and tempo of eighteenth-century warfare." With regards to classroom use, Campion suggested, "the sides can be easily split between more players, an action that will improve the simulation somewhat, especially if communication among allies is inhibited."

The French games magazine Jeux & Stratégie called the Avalon Hill edition "A highly comprehensive and classically designed wargame that invites seasoned enthusiasts to explore a turbulent period of history" and concluded "The only downside is that the map of Central Europe, covered in numbered hexagons, lacks color. Aside from this criticism, Frederick the Great is a game that will fully satisfy wargame enthusiasts."

In Issue 95 of Strategy & Tactics, Mark Acres reviewed the Avalon Hill edition, and found the new scenarios were all unbalanced in favor of the Coalition player. He further commented, "Even worse, the original victory conditions for all the scenarios have been changed, apparently in an effort to balance the three new ones." Despite this, Acres concluded, "Even so, FTG remains one of the classic games on the pre-modern era."

In Issue 90 of the British wargaming magazine Perfidious Albion, Neil Thomas commented that the game has a "Lovely flavour of the Age of Reason and its chesslike manoeuvre warfare. Perfect opportunity to try out the strategy of the central position."

In a retrospective review Issue 17 of Simulacrum written almost thirty years after the game's publication, Luc Olivier commented "For a game published in 1975, Frederick The Great was an innovative, very clean and clever game. The designer succeeded in capturing the feeling of 18th Century warfare in few rules." Olivier concluded, "The game fits well but has been criticized as too generic and lacking some country specific flavor. Nevertheless, it is a real classic still playable more than 25 years later."

== Other reviews and commentary ==
- JagdPanther #13
- Strategy & Tactics #49
- Fire & Movement #5 and #75
- The Wargamer Vol.1 #2, #3 and #17
- Paper Wars #40
- Pursue & Destroy Vol.1 #3
