= Paydirt (game) =

Board game

Paydirt is a two-player board game simulating American football.

== Gameplay ==
Each player selects a team that represents an actual NFL team from a specific season. For each team and each season, a Team Chart designed to reflect that team's strengths and weaknesses during that season is used to direct gameplay. Each "play" of the game consists of the players secretly choosing a type of play (run, short pass, long pass, etc.), rolling dice, and consulting the Team Charts to determine the result of the play.

== History ==
The game was originally published by Time Warner under the name "Sports Illustrated Pro Football". Avalon Hill later bought the game and renamed it Paydirt, marketing it with a college football version of the game called Bowl Bound. Avalon Hill hired Dr. Thomas R. Nicely, a statistician, to redevelop the mathematics of the gameplay.

Avalon Hill published Paydirt until 1995, but some enthusiasts have published Team Charts for subsequent seasons.

== Reviews ==
- The Playboy Winner's Guide to Board Games

== Sources ==
- http://www.datadrivenfootball.com/ - Team Charts for current NFL teams and freeware PC versions of Paydirt and BowlBound
- - Second generation paydirt charts and many free downloads dice
- Paydirt and Bowl Bound at britishempire.co.uk
- Post-1989 Team Charts
- Paydirt and Bowl Bound at BoardGameGeek
- http://www.nascarmodelkits.com/boardgames.html - Learn more about the history of these great football games.
