= Don Greenwood (game designer) =

American game designer

- Cover of The General (July–August 1972) showing its new editor Don Greenwood (on right) and game designer Randy Reed
- Occupations: Game designer; magazine editor
- Known for: Advanced Squad Leader; Outdoor Survival

Don Greenwood is an American board wargame designer and an editor of wargaming magazines.

== Early career ==
Don Greenwood became interested in board wargames in his teens, and became a member of a local chapter of a national wargaming group called SPECTRE.

In 1967, Greenwood started publishing his own wargame fanzine, Panzerfaust, and remained its editor for five years.

== Avalon Hill ==
In 1972, Greenwood joined the staff of Avalon Hill Game Company as Research & Design Director, as well as Editor of the company's house organ, The General. Greenwood was also responsible for resurrecting older games and revising the rules to produce a new edition. His first assignment was to rewrite Jim Dunnigan's rules for the unpublished game Outdoor Survival; once he was finished, the game became a perennial bestseller for Avalon Hill. Other games Greenwood produced new editions of included Anzio, Afrika Korps, and Caesar: Epic Battle of Alesia.

Greenwood helped to organize the first Origins Game Fair in Baltimore in 1975, and suggested calling the event "Origins" as a nod to Avalon Hill's creation of board wargaming. Greenwood also helped to organize the first Avaloncon, which morphed into the World Boardgaming Championships, and was president of the Boardgame Players Association.

== After Avalon Hill ==
In 1982, Greenwood left Avalon Hill but continued to work in the wargame industry, notably for GMT Games.

Don Greenwood's card from Famous Game Designer Trading Cards

== Awards ==
- 1980: Crescendo of Doom won a Charles S. Roberts Award in the category "Best Twentieth Century Game"
- 1990: The Republic of Rome won a James F. Dunnigan Award in the category "Playability and Design"
- 1991: Inducted into the Origins Award Hall of Fame
- 1994: Inducted into the Charles Roberts Awards Hall of Fame
- 2011: Honored as a "famous game designer" by being featured as the king of spades in Flying Buffalo's 1992 and 2011 Famous Game Designer Trading Cards.

== Games ==
Greenwood was the primary designer of these games:

=== Avalon Hill ===
- Outdoor Survival (1972)
- Basketball Strategy (1974)
- Speed Circuit (1977)
- Crescendo of Doom (1979)
- Book of Lists (1979)
- GI: Anvil of Victory (1982)
- Advanced Squad Leader and *Beyond Valor (1985)
- Streets of Fire (1985)
- Paratrooper (1986)
- Hedgerow Hell (1987)
- Yanks (1987)
- Turning Point: Stalingrad (1989)
- New World (1990)
- The Republic of Rome (1990)
- Gung Ho (1992)
- Breakout: Normandy (1992)
- Gangsters (1992)
- Road Kill (1993)
- Age of Renaissance (1996)
- Atlantic Storm (1997)

=== GMT Games ===
- Galaxy: The Dark Ages (2000)
- The Napoleonic Wars (2002)

While working for Avalon Hill, Greenwood significantly revised these already-published games:

- Alexander the Great
- Anzio
- Afrika Korps
- Blitzkrieg
- Business Strategy (a retitled revision of Management)
- Caesar: Epic Battle of Alesia
- Caesar's Legions
- Circus Maximus
- Cross of Iron
- D-Day
- Rise and Decline of the Third Reich
- The Russian Campaign
- Squad Leader
- Stalingrad
- UFO
- War at Sea
- Waterloo
- Win, Place & Show
