= Anzio (disambiguation) =

Anzio is a city in Italy

Anzio may also refer to:

- Anzio (film), a 1968 war film
- Anzio (game), a 1968 board wargame by Avalon Hill
- Anzio Beachhead, a 1969 board wargame by SPI
- Anzio 20mm rifle, an American anti-materiel rifle
- Battle of Anzio, part of the Italian Campaign of World War II
- USS Anzio, two ships of the United States Navy
