= Battle of the Atlantic (board game) =

1975 WWII naval board wargame

- Publishers: Taurus Games
- Publication: 1975
- Genres: World War II naval combat

Battle of the Atlantic, subtitled "The Epic Struggle of the Wolf Pack vs Convoy", is a board wargame published by Taurus Games in 1975 that simulates the Battle of the Atlantic during World War II.

== Description ==
Battle of the Atlantic is a two-player wargame in which one player controls Axis naval forces while the other player controls Allied naval forces and merchant convoys. The game comes with two 21" x 24" hex grid maps (one for each player), 250 die-cut counters, some information sheets and tables, and a 62-page rule book.

=== Gameplay ===
The two players plan each turn secretly, deploying their forces on separate maps. If contact is made (forces enter the same hex on the same turn) then combat is resolved abstractly using a table. Each turn represents one week.

There are a number of scenarios included with the game. In all of them, the Allied player receives victory points for supplies arriving in the UK in excess of the required amount, as well as for sinking German submarines; the Axis player earns victory points for sinking merchant ships. The scenarios are not independent of each other — the only initial set-up given is for the first scenario. In each subsequent scenario, the players use the forces that survived the previous scenario.

== Publication history ==
Battle of the Atlantic was published by Taurus Games, a game company based in Chicago that published a number of naval board wargames. Taurus introduced this game and two other (Raiders of the North and Undersea Warriors) at Origins I in the summer of 1975. The company had trouble fulfilling mail orders for their games, and quickly went out of business.

== Reception ==
In Issue 10–11 of Europa, Clifford Sayres was unhappy that the scenarios were not independent of each other, but noted "The map and counter artwork is somewhat crude, but adequate to the purpose." However, Sayres found the unindexed rulebook a complete disaster, commenting, "It is obvious that a great effort has gone into the game and research. However, the rules in their present state are a severe handicap to popularity except on the part of die-hard naval buffs who are willing to invest the time to decode the rules." Sayres concluded, "I rather suspect that, once unraveled, the game should play reasonably well ... I regret that I cannot recommend the game for the average gamer." In the same issue, Richard Mataka also found the rulebook an impediment to play, noting that it was "written in a narrative form and at times make no sense at all. Normally, when I write a review about something, I want to say something good about it. The problem is that I have not been able to find anything good. I have been reading the rule book off and on and I still haven't figured out whether there is a game." Mataka concluded, "Taurus, who everyone thought was ripping us off [for failure to ship games that had been ordered] finally came out with a product but it looks as though in the long run we are still being ripped off because I sure can't locate a game in that entire mess."

In Issue 7 of Wargamer's Information, Scott Cardinell reported "The length of game ranges from a couple of hours upward, and requires a lot of record keeping and occasionally requires a judge, thus making it impractical to play with fewer than four people." Cardinell concluded, "The game offers considerably less than what was hoped for."

In his 1977 book The Comprehensive Guide to Board Wargaming, Nick Palmer called this game "strategic" rather than tactical, and liked the large variety of forces available to both sides including "Condors and Luftwaffe raiders facing battleships, cruisers, carriers, escort carriers, frigates, destroyers and convoys." However, Palmer found the physical quality of the components to be "less good than usual in wargames."
