= StarSoldier =

Board wargame

1st edition box cover with artwork by Redmond A. Simonsen, 1977

StarSoldier is a science fiction board wargame published by Simulations Publications, Inc. (SPI) in 1977.

== Description ==
StarSoldier is a 2-player game in which one player controls invading aliens, and the other controls StarSoldiers defending the planet.

== Components ==
The game box holds:

- 22" x 34" paper hex grid map
- 400 counters
- rule book
- two Level Record Charts
- two six-sided dice

== Publication history ==
In 1974, SPI published StarForce: Alpha Centauri, the first mass market science fiction game. It sold very well, staying on SPI's Top Ten Bestseller list for four years. As a result, SPI created two spin-off games, Outreach in 1976 and StarSoldier in 1977. StarSoldier was designed by Tom Walczyk, with artwork by Redmond A. Simonsen. When both Outreach and StarSoldier proved popular, SPI packaged them and Star Force in one box as StarForce Trilogy.

StarSoldier debuted on SPI's monthly Top 10 list at No. 9 two months before its release due to pre-publication orders. When it was published in January 1977, it immediately rose to No. 1, and stayed on SPI's Top Ten list for the entire year, either on its own, or as part of the StarForce Trilogy.

Game historian Shannon Appelcline noted that "The Space Gamer #6 ( June/July 1976) [was] the first issue to offer up substantial articles on other publishers' games — including discussions of McEwan Miniatures' Starguard! (1974) and SPI's then-forthcoming StarSoldier (1977)."

== Reception ==
In Issue 6 of The Space Gamer, Amber ap Llychlyn did not like the rationale for the game, pointing out that in the game, civilians are put to sleep using a psychic field to avoid conflict, and thought this made soldiers, and therefore the entire game, unnecessary.

In Issue 32 of Moves, Phil Kosnett compared StarSoldier to Starship Troopers, published in 1976 by Avalon Hill. After a lengthy comparison, Kosnett concluded that "StarSoldier is an innovative game and Starship Troopers is not. Soldier is science fiction, and Troopers is just a 20th Century land game with funny silhouettes on the unit counters."

In Issue 18 of the British wargaming magazine, Perfidious Albion, Geoffrey Barnard thought that "The most interesting feature of the game is perhaps the system of Task Point Allocation ... the only real novelty of the game." Barnard also noted with interest the ability to link StarSoldierto Starforce, noting, "The possibility of Campaign games in conjunction with Starforce most definitely adds to the game's overall value."

In his 1977 book The Comprehensive Guide to Board Wargaming, Nicky Palmer noted that this game was "Tactical combat in the twenty-fifth century, featuring the future history of Starforce at an individual combat level."

In the 1980 book The Complete Book of Wargames, game designer Jon Freeman called this game similar in concept to two other SPI tactical wargames, Sniper! and Patrol. He noted "Games are fairly fluid as units flit from cover to cover, but most boil down to putting out an overwhelming offense while mainting an adequate defense — a combination few units can manage." Freeman gave this game an Overall Evaluation of "Good", concluding, "the game is usually a race to succeed before one side is devastated to the man."

== Other reviews and commentary ==
- Fire & Movement #7
- The Wargamer Vol.1 #3
- Strategist #342
- American Wargamer Vol.5, #1
- Ann Arbor Wargamer #4
- Games & Puzzles #69
