= Raiders of the North =

1975 WWII naval board wargame

- The large cardboard box in which the game was packaged
- Publishers: Taurus Games
- Publication: 1975
- Genres: World War II naval combat

Raiders of the North is a board wargame published by Taurus Games in 1975 that simulates the Battle of the Atlantic during World War II. Critics did not like the massive and poorly-organized rulebook.

== Description ==
Raiders of the North is a two-player wargame in which one player controls Axis naval forces while the other player controls Allied naval forces and merchant convoys. The game comes with two 21" x 24" hex grid maps of the North Atlantic (one for each player), 250 die-cut counters, some information sheets and tables, and a 194-page rule book.

=== Gameplay ===
The two players plan each turn secretly, deploying their forces on separate maps. If contact is made (forces enter the same hex on the same turn) then combat is resolved abstractly using a table. Each turn represents one week.

There are a number of scenarios included with the game. In all of them, the Allied player receives victory points for supplies arriving in the UK in excess of the required amount, as well as for sinking German submarines; the Axis player earns victory points for sinking merchant ships.

== Publication history ==
Raiders of the North was published by Taurus Games, a game company based in Chicago that published a number of naval board wargames. The company had been advertising this game in 1974 in trade magazines, but had been unable to fulfill orders. Taurus introduced this game and two others (Battle of the Atlantic and Undersea Warriors) at Origins I in the summer of 1975. Raiders of the North was sold in a large cardboard box with the game cover pasted on the front. Although Taurus had copies of the game for sale at Origins, they continued to have trouble fulfilling mail orders for their games afterwards, and quickly went out of business.

== Reception ==
In Issue 10–11 of Europa, Tom Oleson wrote "There has never been a rule book such as this, and I doubt if there will be one again soon. It is 194 pages long! It is obvious that this game is a labor of love, and for those not equally overwhelmed by passion for this particular 'saga', ruthless editing would have improved it considerably." Oleson concluded, "It may be that after one has digested this enormous and poorly organized mass of material, some of the scenarios may be playable with the amount of time and effort most wargamers enjoy devoting to a game, but until then, I can only recommend this game to fanatic devotees of the subject; for them, it should be extremely interesting." In the same issue, Richard Mataka also found the rulebook an impediment to play, noting that it was "written in a narrative form and at times makes no sense at all. Normally, when I write a review about something, I want to say something good about it. The problem is that I have not been able to find anything good. I have been reading the rule book off and on and I still haven't figured out whether there is a game." Mataka concluded, "Taurus, who everyone thought was ripping us off [for failure to ship games that had been ordered] finally came out with a product but it looks as though in the long run we are still being ripped off because I sure can't locate a game in that entire mess."

In Issue 7 of Wargamer's Information, Scott Cardinell reported "The length of game ranges from a couple of hours upward, and requires a lot of record keeping and occasionally requires a judge, thus making it impractical to play with fewer than four people." Cardinell concluded, "The game offers considerably less than what was hoped for."

In a 1976 poll conducted by Simulations Publications Inc. (SPI) to determine the most popular board wargames in North America, Raiders of the North placed a dismal 185th out of 202 games.

In his 1977 book The Comprehensive Guide to Board Wargaming, Nick Palmer found the physical quality of the game components poor, but liked the inclusion of specific rules for "torpedoes, destroyers, radar, submarines and fire control."
