= Boardgame Players Association =

The Boardgame Players Association is a non-profit corporation established to support the shared interests of board game players. The BPA is best known for hosting the World Boardgaming Championships.

In addition to its flagship event, the BPA also sponsors or co-sponsors the following annual events:

- Enlightentment – Held in Timonium, Maryland focusing on the Age of Renaissance game
- D-Day – Held in Timonium, Maryland focusing on the Breakout Normandy game
- Waterloo – Held in Timonium, Maryland focusing on the Napoleonic Wars game

The BPA also Play-By-eMail Tournaments for selected games, including:

- Breakout: Normandy
- Manifest Destiny
- Paths of Glory
- The Russian Campaign
- War at Sea
- Victory in the Pacific
- We the People
- For the People
- Empire of the Sun
- Wilderness War

The BPA formerly sponsored the following annual events:

- Euro Quest – Held in Timonium, Maryland focusing on a variety of European-style board games
- Winter Activation Meeting (WAM) – Held in Timonium, Maryland focusing on two-player historical card-driven games
