= Famous Game Designer Trading Cards =

Famous Game Designer Trading Cards are a series of trading cards first published by Flying Buffalo in 1992 that feature well-known game designers.

Front of 1st edition trading card for Frank Chadwick

== Contents ==
In 1992, Rick Loomis of Flying Buffalo put together a deck of low-budget trading cards featuring seven contemporary game designers who had been inducted into the GAMA Hall of Fame:

- himself
- Frank Chadwick
- Jim Dunnigan
- Steve Jackson (the American game designer)
- Marc Miller
- Redmond Simonsen
- Greg Stafford.

When asked how he had chosen the seven designers, Loomis replied, "This first batch was selected by taking the first seven who sent me a photo!"

The 2½" x 3½" cards were originally printed in black and white and packaged in a ziplock bag. The front features a photo of the game designer, year of induction into the GAMA Hall of Fame, hometown, best- and worst-designed games, the person's favorite game designed by someone else, and a quote from the individual. The back of the card lists the person's game design credits, and game design career path to date.

The first batch of card were released at the combined Gen Con/Origins game convention in 1992, but Loomis admitted profit was not the main motivation of the designers involved: "We don’t expect to make any money on these cards; we’re doing it mostly so we can show our parents that we really are 'famous.'"

Later editions of the first set were printed in color, and three more sets of cards were eventually released.

== Reviews ==
In the November 1992 edition of Dragon (Issue #187), Allen Varney, himself a game designer, called the idea "fun", and said, "Here is one more honor to which the rest of us can aspire."
