= The Battle of Eylau (board game) =

1979 Napoleonic board wargames

- Designers: Oscar DeWitt
- Illustrators: Redmond A. Simonsen
- Publishers: Simulations Publications Inc.
- Publication: 1979
- Genres: Napoleonic

The Battle of Eylau is a board wargames published in 1979 by Simulations Publications Inc. (SPI) as a free pull-out game in their house magazine Strategy & Tactics that simulates the Battle of Eylau in 1807.

== Background ==
During the War of the Fourth Coalition in the fall of 1806, Napoleon smashed the Prussian army at the Battle of Jena-Auerstadt, and spent the remainder of the year pursuing the scattered Prussians. In January 1807, the Russian Imperial Army under the command of General Levin August von Bennigsen took advantage of Napoleon's preoccupation to push west across Prussia. Napoleon reacted by moving to the north, hoping to prevent their retreat back to Russia. After Bennigsen's Cossacks captured a copy of Napoleon's orders, Bennigsen rapidly withdrew to the northeast to avoid being cut off. The French army of 45,000 pursued for several days and on 7 January 1807, they found 60,000 Russians drawn up for battle at the town of Eylau.

== Description ==
The Battle of Eylau is a two-player board wargame where one player controls French forces, and the other player controls Russian forces.

=== Gameplay ===
The game uses a set of rules developed for a previous SPI Napoleonic game, Napoleon at War:

- The French player moves all units desired, and engages in combat.
- The second player then has the same opportunity.

In addition, a weather rule attempts to simulate the harsh weather experienced during the battle: A die roll of 1–4 indicates no change to combat results, but on a 5, all retreats on the Combat Results Table (CRT) become eliminations. On a 6, all CRT results are reversed.

== Publication history ==
Issue 75 of Strategy & Tactics contained the free pull-out wargame The Battle of Eylau, a wargame designed by Omar DeWitt, with graphic design by Redmond A. Simonsen. After its publication, SPI combined Eylau with another Napoleonic game, The Battle of Dresden and published the two games as a boxed set, Napoleon's Art of War. The game failed to gain traction in the marketplace, and did not crack SPI's Top Ten Bestseller List.

== Reception ==
In the 1980 book The Best of Board Wargaming, Marcus Watney was not impressed, calling it "rather bland and uninteresting." Watney concluded by giving Eylau an Excitement grade of only 20%.

In Issue 27 of the British wargaming magazine Phoenix, Donald Mack liked two of Eylau's unique rules, especially the bad weather rule, saying, "These possibilities make things marvellously uncertain."

In Issue 53 of Moves, Ian Chadwick did not like the complete lack of morale check, noting "Without morale constraints, it's a bloody game. You will never see the Allies flee the field as they did in reality, due to crumbling morale and strength." Chadwick also pointed out that the heights on which the Russians had been entrenched did not appear on the map. Although he found Eylau "not bad to play", he didn't think it was a good historical simulation, and "will not reflect the event on the fields of Eylau without changes in both map and rules." Chadwick concluded by giving Eylau grades of B for playability and C for historical accuracy.
