= The Battle of Dresden (board game) =

1979 Napoleonic board wargames

- Designers: Bob Jervis
- Illustrators: Redmond A. Simonsen
- Publishers: Simulations Publications Inc.
- Publication: 1979
- Genres: Napoleonic

The Battle of Dresden is a board wargames published in 1979 by Simulations Publications Inc. (SPI) as a free pull-out game in their house magazine Strategy & Tactics that simulates the Battle of Dresden in 1813.

== Background ==
In 1813, Russian, Prussian and Austrian forces of the Sixth Coalition assaulted a French force securely entrenched behind the walls of Dresden. As the Allied forces began their attack, major reinforcements arrived led by Napoleon.

== Description ==
The Battle of Dresden is a two-player board wargame where one player controls French forces, and the other player controls the forces of the Sixth Coalition.

=== Gameplay ===
The game uses a set of rules developed for a previous SPI Napoleonic game, Napoleon at War:

- The French player moves all units desired, and engages in combat.
- The second player then has the same opportunity.

In addition. morale varies according to retreats and advances, and reserves are not allowed to enter the game until morale descends to a certain point.

== Publication history ==
Issue 75 of Strategy & Tactics contained the free pull-out wargame The Battle of Dresden, a wargame designed by Bob Jervis, with graphic design by Redmond A. Simonsen. After its publication, SPI combined Dresden with another Napoleonic game, The Battle of Eylau and published the two games as a boxed set, Napoleon's Art of War. The boxed set failed to gain traction in the marketplace, and did not crack SPI's Top Ten Bestseller List.

== Reception ==
In the 1980 book The Best of Board Wargaming, Marcus Watney called it a small game, "unpretentious and satisfying as far as they go ... an excellent game for the novice. The SPI rules are an encouraging model of clarity and ergonomics, and go a long way towards helping the newcomer enter the hobby with a minimum of distress!" Watney concluded by giving Dresden an Excitement grade of 40%, saying "Dresden is worth purchasing on its own merits."

In Issue 27 of the British wargaming magazine Phoenix, Donald Mack pointed to the reserve rule in Dresden and noted that it was open to abuse by the Allied player, who could manipulate it to gain an unfair and unhistorical advantage.

In Issue 53 of Moves, Ian Chadwick liked the morale and reserve rules in Dresden, saying, "These are nice touches and a welcome breath of fresh air in the [Napoleon at War] system." However, Chadwick did not like the game overall, calling it "a slow, slugging match, bloody and senseless, in which the Allied player batters his army against the walls of the city. Little fun, and despite redeeming characteristics in the rules, not a game to play more than once." Chadwick concluded by giving Dresden grades of C for playability and C for historical accuracy.
