= Russian campaign (disambiguation) =

Russian campaign is the military campaign that took place in 1812 when Napoleon Bonaparte's Grande Armée invaded the Russian Empire.

Russian campaign may also refer to:

- Eastern Front (World War II)
- The Russian Campaign, a strategic board wargame of World War II on the Eastern Front 1941–1945
