= Anzio Beachhead (wargame) =

1969 WWII board wargame

- Cover of Strategy & Tactics #134, containing the 1990 edition of the game
- Designers: Dave Williams
- Publishers: Simulations Publications Inc.
- Publication: 1969
- Genres: WWII

Anzio Beachhead is a board wargame published by Simulations Publications Inc. (SPI) in 1969 that simulates the Battle of Anzio during World War II, when American amphibious forces landed at Anzio, seeking to open a second front in Italy. The game was designed as a supplement to the larger and more complex game Anzio that had been published the previous year by industry rival Avalon Hill.

== Background ==
In June 1944, the northward Allied advance in Italy had ground to a halt as entrenched German defenders contested every ridge and river valley. In an effort to cut German supply lines, an American force under Major General John P. Lucas landed at Anzio, only 65 km (40 mi) south of Rome. However, Lucas failed to quickly break out of the beachhead, and German defenders were able to consolidate and counterattack.

== Description ==
Anzio Beachhead is a two-player operational wargame in which one player controls the Allied forces trying to break out of the beach, and the other player controls the German forces trying to contain and destroy the Allies before reinforcements can arrive.

=== Components ===
The game includes:

- 17" x 22" paper hex grid map scaled at 1,340 m (1,470 yd) per hex
- 100 die-cut counters
- 8-page rulebook

=== Gameplay ===
A game consists of only seven turns. Each turn has six impulses:

1. Allied units move their full value and attack
2. German units move half their movement value but cannot move into any Allied zone of control
3. Allied units move their full movement factor
4. German units move their full movement factor and attack
5. Allied units move half their movement factor but cannot enter any German zone of control
6. German units move their full movement factor

=== Victory Conditions ===
The German player must fulfill any one of three victory conditions by the end of the seventh turn in order to win:

1. Eliminate all Allied units
2. Have at least one unit in or adjacent to Anzio or Nettuno
3. Have at least twice as much combat strength on the board as the Americans AND occupy (or be the last to pass through) several specific objectives

The Allied player wins by preventing the German player from achieving any of these.

== Publication history ==
In the book Zones of Control, Henry Lowood pointed out that "Several titles in SPI's original Test Series revised, extended or applied game designs previously published by Avalon Hill," and held up Anzio Beachhead as a prime example. In 1968, freelance game designer Dave Williams created a large and complex wargame covering the entire Italian campaign of 1943–44 and sold it to Avalon Hill. The game company chose to title it Anzio even though the game did not specifically focus on the Battle of Anzio (and as game designer Don Turnbull and game critic Nick Palmer both pointed out, Anzio can be played without any landing at Anzio.) The following year, Williams designed a much smaller and simpler game that was specifically focused on the Anzio landing with the idea that this could be used as a supplement to the large Avalon Hill game. He sold it to SPI, who published it as Anzio Beachhead, a pull-out game in Issue 20 of Strategy & Tactics. The game featured art by Joyce Gusner, and graphic design by Redmond A. Simonsen.

The game was republished by SPI as a boxed set in 1973, in a plain white box with a red title ribbon. The game was then repackaged in a "flatpack" box with an integral counter tray.

After the demise of SPI, World Wide Wargames (3W) acquired the game license and a new edition was republished in Strategy & Tactics #134 in 1990 with art by Ted Koller.

== Reception ==
In Issue 23 of Albion, Don Turnbull liked the 6-impulse game system, calling it "very workable and realistic. It seems to duplicate well the 'attack, gain ground, reform, prepare for counter-attack' of actual action." He also liked the brevity of the 7-turn game, commenting, "There is a lot to be said for a good, brief game at the moment, with many games taking 6+ hours to complete." He concluded by calling it "An enjoyable and entertaining game. [...] We think most people will enjoy it, and recommend it." Two years later, Turnbull added "Short in play, yet with many interesting features and by no means easy to play well."

== Other reviews and commentary ==
- Panzerfaust #59
- Strategy & Tactics #134
- Fire & Movement #68
- The Wargamer Vol.2 #22
