= BattleFleet Mars =

Board wargame

Artwork by Redmond A. Simonsen, 1977

BattleFleet Mars, subtitled "Space Combat in the 21st Century", is a science fiction board wargame published by Simulations Publications, Inc. (SPI) in 1977 that simulates combat in the inner Solar System.

== Gameplay ==
BattleFleet Mars is a two-player game in which one player controls spaceships owned by rich Earth corporations that have made vast amounts of money from mining in the asteroid belt, and the other player controls spaceships used by miners on Mars and on asteroids who are seeking independence from Terran control. The planets and asteroids on the map change position as they orbit around the Sun, resulting in different distances between planets at various points during the game.

=== Components ===
The game box or ziplock bag comes with:

- 22" x 34" map of the inner Solar System (from Jupiter inwards. Four asteroids are depicted between the orbits of Mars and Jupiter.
- Tactical display
- 400 die-cut counters
- two time/distance measures
- rules booklet
- a pad of Battle Record sheets
- two six-sided dice

=== Movement ===
The map does not have a standard hex grid. Instead, distances are measured and a time for arrival (in turns) is applied.

=== Combat ===
Combat can either be resolved through a standard tactical resolution, or via a much simplified table.

=== Victory conditions ===
Victory is not achieved through military victories, but via morale. If one player, through gaining geographical objectives, winning battles and through the use of agents and propaganda, can push their opponent's morale to the point where the opponent's forces no longer have the will to fight, then the war is over.

== Publication history ==
BattleFleet Mars was designed by Brad Hessel and Redmond A. Simonsen, and Simonsen also supplied the graphics and cover art. SPI published in it March 1977, and the game stayed on SPI's Top Ten Bestseller list for six months.

== Reception ==
Reception was mixed, with some reviewers not in favor, and others liking it.

In Issue 12 of The Space Gamer, Howard Thompson was disappointed in BattleField Mars, saying, "the game disappointed me because it seemed to promise so much. It isn't a great game, just an average game that may have started out to be great."

In the next issue of The Space Gamer, Lynn David Wolpert was ambivalent, concluding, "I would say to take the game at face value. It has its good points and bad points, yet achieves the goals it sets upon itself."

In the inaugural issue of Ares, Eric Goldberg liked the game, pointing out that "Every time there is a battle, it may be resolved using the tactical game, or via a simplified strategic version." Goldberg concluded by giving the game an above-average rating of 8 out of 9, saying, "BattleFleet Mars remains one of the better science fiction games."

In Issue 11 of Phoenix, E.K. Merryweather warned "Not for those of you who like conventional games with front lines and the like." Merryweather concluded, "this game is great fun and well worth getting."

In the 1980 book The Complete Book of Wargames, game designer Jon Freeman was ambivalent, saying, "This is probably the best simulation of a war in space yet published, but despite its realism it doesn't work as a game. Although the rationale is well developed, there's too much complexity in the game for the interest it can sustain. Play is usually stopped by boredom, rather than by any conclusion." Freeman concluded by giving the game an Overall Evaluation of only "Fair", saying, "A lot of effort has gone into BattleFleet Mars, but playing it takes more work that the subject justifies."

== Other reviews and commentary ==
- Strategist #342
- The Wargamer Vol.1 #7
