= Anzio (game) =

1969 WWII board wargame

- 1st edition box cover, 1969
- Designers: 1969: Dave Williams; 1971: Tom Oleson; 1978: Don Greenwood
- Illustrators: Rodger B. MacGowan
- Publishers: Avalon Hill
- Publication: 1969, 1974, 1978, 1980
- Genres: WWII

Anzio is a board wargame published by the Avalon Hill game company first in 1969 and again in 1971, 1974, and 1978. The title is misleading as the game is not an operational-level treatment of the Battle of Anzio but is in fact a strategic level game covering the entire Italian theater of operations in World War II from the autumn of 1943 to the end of the war in Europe.

== Components ==
=== Map ===
The playing surface consists of two mounted mapboards placed end-to-end, with major terrain features including the mountains and rivers which in reality impeded the Allied advance. The heel and toe of Italy's southern regions are not shown.

=== Counters ===
Combat units are depicted in a wide variety of colors. Luftwaffe units (Luftwaffe men fighting as ground forces) are shown in a separate shade of blue, German Army (Heer) in grey, and Waffen SS units in black. U.S. forces (including a Brazilian division) are shown in yellow, while the cosmopolitan Eighth Army includes British, Canadian, Indian (red), Polish (pink), South African and New Zealand (pale blue) units, as well as a Greek and a Jewish brigade. There are also several Free French units (dark blue). Some U.S. and Free French forces are removed from the game in the summer of 1944 to take part in the Dragoon landings in the south of France.

The counters represent divisions, but the game also contains numerous extra counters for divisions to reduce in strength as they take combat losses or else break down into their component regiments.

Tom Oleson commented that the game's order of battle was proven accurate by later books.

== The game ==
The time frame of the game begins with amphibious landings of the U.S. Fifth Army, which may take place at Salerno as in reality, or else at any of another set of initial landing areas (the permissible size of force which may be landed varies for each area), while the British Eighth Army forces enter the map from southern Italy. The German player has a chance to build fortifications, which may well cause the line to solidify for some months across the narrowest part of Italy, i.e. the Gustav Line through Monte Cassino, which the Allies may eventually break with airstrikes. The Allied player also has the chance to conduct a second invasion (the Anzio landing in reality).

The rules allow for structured learning by including four levels of complexity (five if variants are also counted). There is also a matrix of victory conditions and variable game length, so players will be uncertain when the game will end, or who has "won" until it does so.

1980 edition with cover art by Rodger B. MacGowan

== Publication history ==
Anzio was designed by freelance designer Dave Williams and purchased by Avalon Hill, who published the game in 1969. The game sold poorly — the company history notes that "Anzio was loaded with innovation and its highly colorful and functional mapboard combined with step reduction combat should have made it an instant hit. Not so. The game was soon discontinued due to disappointing sales. Handicapped by an unattractive box and confusing rules, the game never got the play it deserved."

Although the game was discontinued in 1971, Tom Oleson redeveloped the game, and it was republished in 1974. Don Greenwood revised it again, and the third edition was released in 1978. A fourth edition, with new cover art by Rodger B. MacGowan, was released in 1980.

== Critical reception ==
The original game was criticized for poor box art and research; later versions received higher praise.

In Issue 4 of the UK magazine Games & Puzzles, (August 1972), game designer Don Turnbull called Anzio "perhaps the most popular of the complex games [available at that time]." In comparison to another complex Avalon Hill game, 1914, Turnbull thought Anzio "has a number of advantages over 1914 — the play mechanics are neater, the rules are clearer, and the player is given considerable scope for tactical ingenuity as well as strategic thought." Two issues later, Turnbull and Mike Nethercot expressed dismay that Avalon Hill had withdrawn this game from publication, commenting, "The Beginner's Game is an ideal introduction to games of this type. [...] Anzio is a MUST for wargames fans: it will be remembered when lesser games are forgotten." Turnbull and Nethercot concluded by giving the game a very good rating of 5 out of 6, saying, "We simply cannot understand why Avalon Hill have withdrawn this superb game from the grasp of enthusiasts."

In the June 1975 edition of Airfix Magazine, Bruce Quarrie found the rules to be "sensible, if overlong and improperly indexed." He was of two minds about the damage step reduction system, "a system with obvious attractions, but the disadvantage of up to six counters of varying strength for each unit. Hunting these out initially can take up to an hour." In the end, Quarrie advised gamers to not buy this product, saying, "we cannot recommend this game, since despite obvious care and effort, the designers were defeated by the geography and campaign. Italy is long and thin, the Germans can only establish an armoured line in the many suitable Apennine ranges and swamps and wait for the numerically superior Allies to batter at them turn after turn. Boring!"

In Issue 18 of the British wargaming magazine Perfidious Albion, Tom Oleson noted "The worst features of this game are a deceptively handsome map which could only have been drawn by someone who had no idea of wargames, as about 1/4 of the hexes have some ambiguity, and rules that would profit from simplification." Oleson noted that the basic game was unbalanced in favor of the German player, but "is one of the few I know of where sudden, unexpected stunning check-mates are possible."

In his 1977 book The Comprehensive Guide to Board Wargaming, Nicholas Palmer noted the long game times (3–9 hours), calling the game "Interesting, varied and challenging, but not for the impatient." In his 1980 sequel, The Best of Board Wargaming, Palmer included a review by Tom Oleson (the designer), who said, "the best feature of Anzio may not be apparent in one or two playings; this is the satisfying realism with which a multi-unit battle is simulated. It's hard to think of a comparable game which does it better" although "the worst aspects of the game are the inevitable long periods when, in faithful simulation of the campaign, little happens". "Paradoxically, the game's most admired feature — the colourful and handsome mapboard — is functionally its weakest point" because not only are Sicily and the heel and toe of Italy omitted, but there are some points of obscurity (e.g. roads which nick the corner of a hexagon). He also criticizes the crudeness with which the decisive Allied airstrikes, which in reality took place over a period of six to eight weeks in the spring of 1944, are simulated in a single turn (likened by some players to a thermonuclear attack on the German lines - although the resulting collapse of the German positions is accurate) and an anomaly whereby weak enemy units left near the front line can be destroyed in combat, thus generating extra exploitation movement for the victorious attacker. Palmer then commented that Oleson's review of his own game is "scrupulously fair" and added that the game takes time to play as it features high counter density in a small map area (he gives the game an "excitement" grade of only 50%). Palmer likened it to Rise and Decline of the Third Reich in that it deals out "terrible retribution for small oversights" and is thus best suited to specialist players who wish to develop expertise gradually.

== Other reviews and commentary ==
- Panzerfaust #56 (Nov-Dec 1972) and #66

== Variants ==
Although the published game can only be started in September 1943, alternative scenarios for the "Diadem" offensive (which broke through the Gustav Line in May 1944) and for the autumn 1944 assault on the Gothic Line (north of Florence) were published in the Avalon Hill "General" magazine. Extension maps covering Sicily and the heel and toe of Italy have also been created by enthusiasts.

== See also ==
- 8th Army (board game)
