= StarForce: Alpha Centauri =

1974 science fiction board wargame

Interstellar Conflict in the 25th Century
- Artwork by Redmond A. Simonsen
- Designers: Redmond A. Simonsen
- Publishers: SPI
- Publication: January 1, 1974; 52 years ago
- Years active: 1974 to 1982
- Genres: Board game, Wargame
- Players: 1 to 3
- Playing time: 4 hours
- Chance: some
- Materials required: pens and paper

StarForce: Alpha Centauri, subtitled "Interstellar Conflict in the 25th Century", is a science fiction board wargame published by Simulations Publications Inc. (SPI) in 1974. It was the first mass-market science fiction board wargame, and was a best-seller for SPI.

== Description ==
StarForce is a board game for 1–3 players using a map with 74 star systems in a sphere 40 light years in diameter, with Earth at the center. Ships are moved from place to place through telekinetic powers. If opposing ships end up in the same space, combat results.

The game has two sets of rules for Basic and Advanced games. The rules also include fifteen scenarios, including one for solo play. More scenarios were subsequently published in SPI's Moves.

=== Components ===
The game contains:

- 22"x34", mounted star map
- 200 die-cut cardboard playing pieces
- rules folder
- Simultaneous Movement Plotting Pad
- plastic storage tray

=== Mechanics ===
The game map represents a three-dimensional volume of space within 20 light years of Earth, with star positions based on astronomical data from the edition of the Gliese Catalogue of Nearby Stars available in 1974. Game pieces represent one StarGate, or single or multiple StarForces (squadrons of four TeleShips). Game turns represent 12 hours (strategic turns) or 1 hour (tactical turns).

The Basic Game restricts action to the just-described star map. Groups of StarForces maneuver on the map and, when they come into combat, battle through an abstract combat system; fixed StarGate units at given star systems both enhance movement ranges and assist in combat. All movement is pre-plotted and resolved simultaneously. Also, movement is "semi-hidden": the vertical positions of StarForces are not revealed to the opponent, nor are the actual numbers of StarForces in given hexes, until they are moved into positions where that information would need to be revealed to determine if combat takes place. Many scenarios are provided, based on conflicts in the background future history for the game; their victory conditions are based on neutralizing enemy StarGates and occupying star systems that are under contention.

The Advanced Game adds a small tactical maneuver map and rules for tactical combat. When enemy forces engage, they are transferred to the tactical map and maneuver, attack, and defend using a set number of action points per tactical turn. Unlike the Basic Game combat system, a successful attack does not destroy a StarForce, but transfers it to a random location on the strategic map.

In addition to the Basic and Advanced Game rules, many optional rules are provided for players who wish to experiment with them, including use of reserve forces that may be brought into battle after an engagement starts, decoy units ("FakerForces"), enhanced movement options with StarGates, and suggested procedures for doing away with plotted movement.

== Publication history ==
Starforce: Alpha Centauri, the first mass market science fiction wargame produced, was designed by Redmond A. Simonsen, who also did all the graphical design and artwork. The game was a bestseller for SPI, appearing on SPI's monthly Top 10 list 14 times. and resulted in two spin-off board games: Outreach (1976) and StarSoldier (1977).

== Reception ==
In the March 1975 edition of Airfix Magazine, Bruce Quarrie was ambivalent about the game, saying, "Generally it is a good game though not inspiring." He found that "The tactical display is cumbersome to use initially, but after a few games this passes — although some skilful alteration of the rules might by no means be a bad thing."

In Issue 3 of Perfidious Albion, Charles Vasey and Geoff Barnard traded comments about the game. Barnard noted, "I found this game much more interesting that I had imagined. My only real complaint was the fact that the suggested 'future history' that underlies the game and is the basis for the motive forces does not fit in with any of the [science fiction] that I have ever read, and is therefore difficult to accept." Vasey replied, "As I consider most SF theories to be weakly reasoned drivel, I found it less of a problem to 'accept' this theory of space travel over any other. I found the designer (Redmond Simonsen) has made a good job of building up his premises ... I found the tactical system rather long winded and cumbersome." They concluded, "Combat, both tactical and strategic, has many novel features and one needs to play the game several times to really get to grips with it."

In his 1977 book The Comprehensive Guide to Board Wargaming, Nicholas Palmer called StarForce "one of the most successful and widely played space games."

In Issue 8 of Phoenix, Stuart McGregor noted that "actual play is fairly complex, although experienced players should find no difficulties." He concluded by calling Starforce "a fascinating game and certainly worth getting."

In the inaugural issue of Ares Magazine (March 1980), Eric Goldberg gave a retrospective review of the game published six years earlier, and commented "Play can seem very stale at times, due to the peculiarities of the system. StarForce was the first mass market science fiction wargame, and holds up remarkably well." Goldberg concluded by giving the game an average rating of 6 out of 9.

In the 1980 book The Complete Book of Wargames, game designer Jon Freeman noted that long playing times caused by written movement plots were further exacerbated by the Advanced Game's combat system. Nevertheless, Freeman found that the uncertainty caused by the simultaneous movement system "creates an air of tension seldom realized in wargames." Freeman concluded by giving this game an Overall Evaluation of "Good."

== Awards ==
Starforce: Alpha Centauri was a finalist for the Charles S. Roberts Award for "Best Professional Game of 1974".

== Other reviews and commentary ==
- Strategy & Tactics #45
- Space Gamer #3
- American Wargamer Vol. 2, #12
- Pursue & Destroy Vol. 1, #4
- 1980 Games 100 in Games

== Cultural impact ==
The synthpop group The Human League took their name from one of the StarForce interstellar states.
