= Gangsters (board game) =

Gangsters is a board game about American organized crime syndicates

Cover art by George Parrish Jr., 1992

Gangsters is a board game about American organized crime syndicates in the 1920s that was published by Avalon Hill in 1992.

== Description ==
Gangsters is a game for 2–4 players in which players are members of a gang in Prohibition-era Chicago. In order to win, players amass money from extortion and other crimes, then buy properties and bribe cops.

=== Components ===
The game contains

- a 22" x 16" board
- 4 player aid cards
- die-cut cardboard counters and pawns
- 8-page rule book
- five different colored dice (black, red, green, blue, and white)
- 40 pieces of play currency in various denominations
- 1 movement pawn
- 1 squirt gun

=== Gameplay ===
Each turn, the active player may

- Buy a property (which then becomes the player's "Joint"), or may improve a previously purchased Joint, or may trade a Joint to another player.
- Bribe or move cops
- Move gang members
- Recruit new gang members
- Collect money earned by gang members
- Resolve any shootouts

=== Victory conditions ===
In the Basic Game, a player wins when the player's gang has at least one Racketeer, one Vamp, and one Thug, and the player has also met any one of three conditions:

- The player controls all properties of one color, or
- The player controls ten Joints, or
- The player has accumulated $10,000

=== Optional rules: 5-player game ===
A fifth player can join the game as the corrupt Police Commissioner, and can win the game by accumulating $10,000 and having control of one loyal Cop.

== Publication history ==
Gangsters was designed by Don Greenwood and published by Avalon Hill in 1992. The board was designed by Charles Kibler, the marker art by Dave Dobyski, and the box cover art by George Parrish Jr.

== Reviews ==
In the September 1993 edition of Dragon (Issue #197), Allen Varney commented, "I don’t like seeing criminals glamorized; that said, this design shows a charm and excitement independent of its subject. Don Greenwood has designed games for the Avalon Hill Game Company for about as long as I’ve breathed. Enjoy this tasty fruit of his long experience."
