= Age of Renaissance =

Board game

The Age of Renaissance game box

Age of Renaissance is a board game designed by Don Greenwood and Jared Scarborough and published by Avalon Hill in 1996. The game is for 3-6 players and the box claims that the game should take 2–6 hours to play, though as with any serious multiplayer strategy game, this can entirely depend on the players. Age of Renaissance is set in the European Renaissance historical era and is somewhat of a sequel to Civilization. In 1997, Age of Renaissance won the Origins Award for Best Pre-20th Century Board Game of 1996.

== Game play ==
In Age of Renaissance, each player takes the role of one of six commercial capitals of Europe: Venice, Genoa, Barcelona, London, Paris, and Hamburg. Initially each player controls one city, their capital. As the game progresses, each player's financial empire grows to a larger number of cities which provide income each turn. Each region where a city can be established also produces one of a number of different commodities: stone, wool, timber, grain, wine, cloth, metal, fur, silk, spice, gold, or ivory. Control of commodities doesn't do anything alone, but when a commodity card is played, every player with stakes in that commodity cashes in. Commodities and income from cities provide players with their two main sources of income. Players then use that money to buy counters to expand their empire, and to buy civilization advances that have various effects on the game.

There is a deck of cards that players draw from. Once the deck is depleted, a new batch of cards (and some of the used cards) are shuffled in and the game progresses to the second epoch. Once the deck is depleted again, more new cards (and again some of the used cards) are shuffled to form a new deck for the third epoch. Once the deck is depleted a third time, the game ends and the player with the highest score wins. Score is determined by adding up the values of a player's advances and cash, less a penalty for the "misery" of their people. The rules also suggest shorter versions of the game that end after either one or two epochs.

The game has many complexities and interesting rules that add to the gameplay. For instance, each player secretly bids for the number of units they want to control in a given turn. The player with the fewest units goes first, and the player with the most goes last. However, the rules for combat give a significant advantage in effectiveness to the players going early in a turn rather than later, leaving players with an interesting choice. Another noteworthy rule is the requirement that all diplomacy take place in the open at the table, thus not allowing any secret deals to be made and speeding up the game's pace slightly.

Strategically, it is critical in a game of Age of Renaissance to recognize the player in the lead. There are many cards that can significantly hurt a specific player, and these are best used to keep the leader(s) in check lest they run away with the game.

== Reviews ==
- Backstab Issue 02
- Casus Belli #101
