= Air Baron =

Board game

- Box art for Air Baron Cover art for Air Baron
- Players: 2-6
- Setup time: 10 minutes
- Playing time: 1 to 2 hours
- Chance: Medium
- Age range: 10 and up
- Skills: Money Management, Tactics

Air Baron is an economic strategy game published by Avalon Hill in 1996. Despite its family-oriented marketing, Air Baron plays far more like a wargame than a typical family money-driven game like Monopoly. Air Baron is for two to six players, adjusting the playable area and victory conditions accordingly.

== Gameplay ==
Air Baron challenges players to build an airline empire in the United States by amassing a plurality of market share and liquid assets.

Players seek to gain dominance or control of hubs in order to amass market share. Dominance of a hub is gained by controlling the majority of associated domestic spokes; it carries a moderate income potential and market share gain. Control of a hub is gained by controlling all of the associated domestic spokes; it doubles the income potential and market share gain of dominance.

Any uncontrolled domestic spoke may be purchased at face value. Takeovers of controlled spokes require a higher fee and an opposed dice roll versus the controlling player. Several factors contribute both positively and negatively to each player's dice total.

If, at the end of his turn, a player has a combined total of market share and cash equal to or greater than the victory margin, he wins.

=== Play order ===
At the start of each round, one color-coded chit per player is placed in a cup. The chits are drawn sequentially to determine the current order of play. While the order of play in an individual round is generally unimportant, the interval between turns for a single player is a significant consideration.

=== Starting cash on hand ===
Starting cash is determined by die roll. To offset the advantage of first play, each player receives cumulatively more money during the initial turn.

=== Income ===
Every purchased spoke, plus all hubs, have a unique chit placed in a cup. At the start of every turn, the player randomly draws two chits, paying the owner appropriately. Chits are replaced at the end of each round.

=== Additional purchases ===
Beyond the primary domestic spokes, players can also purchase foreign spokes and jumbo jets. Foreign spokes benefit opposed takeovers at the associated hubs. Jumbo jets provide similar bonuses on the domestic spoke where deployed, or they can be held in reserve for later use in an opposed takeover. Additionally, spokes with jumbos pay double the usual rate.

=== Offensive operations ===
Normally players are limited to one purchase or takeover attempt per turn. However, players can declare a state of Fare Wars that allow an indefinite number of domestic takeover attempts provided:

- The player has sufficient funds
- The player does not fail an attempt

While in Fare Wars, players receive an additional takeover dice roll bonus. Profits, however, are not earned while in Fare Wars. Since the state can only be entered or exited at the beginning of a player's turn, the randomized play order has a major impact on the potential for income loss.

=== Optional rules ===
Several optional rules, including strikes, crashes, government loans, and bidding, are provided as part of an advanced version. These rules may be added to the basic game collectively or individually as desired.

== Reception ==
Pyramid magazine reviewed Air Baron and stated that "the truth is that Air Baron is a fine game, every bit as good in its own way as the classic Rail Baron."
