= Napoleon's Art of War =

1979 collection of two Napoleonic board wargames

Napoleon's Art of War was a pull-out game in Strategy & Tactics #75. The cover art, which was also used on the game's boxed set, featured a black & white copy of the painting Vive L'Empereur by Jean Baptiste Édouard Detaille

Napoleon's Art of War is a collection of two board wargames published in 1979 by Simulations Publications Inc. (SPI) that simulate Napoleonic battles.

== Description ==
Napoleon's Art of War is two separate games packaged in the same box:

- Dresden: A simulation of the 1813 Battle of Dresden designed by Bob Jervis, in which the Allied Army of Bohemia, consisting of Russian, Prussian and Austrian forces, assaulted a French force securely entrenched behind the walls of Dresden. As they began their attack major reinforcements arrived led by Napoleon, who counter-attacked and won a clear victory.
- Eylau: A simulation of the 1807 Battle of Eylau designed by Omar DeWitt, in which Napoleon's French army won a costly victory over a Prussian-Russian force battles in a remote area of East Prussia (now Bagrationovsk in Russia) during a blinding snowstorm.

=== Gameplay ===
Both games use a set of rules developed for a previous SPI Napoleonic game, Napoleon at War. In addition, both games have some unique rules.

In Dresden

- Morale varies according to retreats and advances.
- Reserves are not allowed to enter the game until morale descends to a certain point.

In Eylau

- The Weather rule attempts to simulate the harsh weather experienced during the battle: A die roll of 1–4 indicates no change to combat results, but on a 5, all retreats on the Combat Results Table (CRT) become eliminations. On a 6, all CRT results are reversed.

== Publication history ==
Between 1975 and 1979, SPI published a large number of "quadrigames" — four thematically connected games packaged in the same box that used one set of rules. Napoleon's Art of War differed from the "quadrigame" format, having only two games in the same box. It was published as a free pull-out game in Issue 75 of SPI's house magazine Strategy & Tactics, and was also released as a boxed set. The game failed to gain traction in the marketplace, and did not crack SPI's Top Ten Bestseller List.

== Reception ==
In the 1980 book The Best of Board Wargaming, Marcus Watney commented, "These are small games, unpretentious and satisfying as far as they go. They are an excellent games for the novice [...] the SPI rules are an encouraging model of clarity and ergonomics, and go a long way towards helping the newcomer enter the hobby with a minimum of distress!" Watney thought Dresden, with its emphasis on morale, was the superior game, noting, "In comparison, Eylau is rather bland and uninteresting." Watney concluded by giving Dresden an Excitement grade of 40%, while Eylau only rated 20%, saying "Dresden is worth purchasing on its own merits, so Eylau should be looked on as an extra, and not judged too harshly."

In Issue 27 of the British wargaming magazine Phoenix, Donald Mack liked two of Eylau's unique rules, especially the bad weather rule, saying, "These possibilities make things marvellously uncertain." However, Mack pointed to the reserve rule in Dresden and noted that it was open to abuse by the Allied player, who could manipulate it to gain an unfair and unhistorical advantage.

In Issue 53 of Moves, Ian Chadwick liked the morale and reserve rules in Dresden, saying, "These are nice touches and a welcome breath of fresh air in the [Napoleon at War] system." However, Chadwick did not like the game overall, calling it "a slow, slugging match, bloody and senseless, in which the Allied player batters his army against the walls of the city. Little fun, and despite redeeming characteristics in the rules, not a game to play more than once." Reviewing Eylau, Chadwick did not like the complete lack of morale check, noting "Without morale constraints, it's a bloody game. You will never see the Allies flee the field as they did in reality, due to crumbling morale and strength." Chadwick also pointed out that the heights on which the Russians had been entrenched did not appear on the map. Although he found Eylau "not bad to play", he didn't think it was a good historical simulation, and "will not reflect the event on the fields of Eylau without changes in both map and rules." Chadwick concluded by giving Dresden grades of C for playability and C for historical accuracy, and Eylau grades of B for playability and C for historical accuracy.
