= Origins Awards =

Games award

The Origins Awards are American awards for outstanding work in the gaming industry. They are presented by the Game Manufacturers Association (GAMA) at the Origins Game Fair on an annual basis for games released in the preceding year. For example, the 1979 awards were given at the 1980 game fair. Award categories include board games, card games, tabletop role-playing games, strategy games, and game accessories.

== History ==
History of Categories

The Origins Awards were initially presented at the Origins Game Fair in five categories: Best Professional Game, Best Amateur Game, Best Professional Magazine, Best Amateur Magazine and Adventure Gaming Hall of Fame. Since the first ceremony, the game categories have widened to include Board games (Traditional, Historical and Abstract), Card games (Traditional and Trading), Miniature wargaming (Historical, Science Fiction and Fantasy), Role-playing games and play-by-mail games. There are additional categories for Graphic Design, for game expansions and accessories, and for game-related fiction. During the 1980s and 1990s, awards were also given to Computer games. Starting in 2003, the Origins Awards began a new category called the Vanguard Award, which honored highly innovative games.

Charles S. Roberts Awards

Originally, the Charles S. Roberts Awards and the Origins Awards were one and the same. Starting with the 1987 awards, the Charles S. Roberts were given separately, and they moved away from Origins entirely in 2000, leaving the Origins Awards as a completely separate system. In 1978, the awards also hosted the 1977 H. G. Wells awards for role-playing games and miniature wargaming.

== Hall of Fame ==
=== Members ===
- Aaron Allston
- Dave Arneson
- Richard Berg
- Jolly R. Blackburn
- Larry Bond
- Gerald Brom
- Darwin Bromley
- Bob Charrette
- Frank Chadwick
- Vlaada Chvátil
- Loren L. Coleman
- Greg Costikyan
- Liz Danforth
- James F. Dunnigan
- Larry Elmore
- Mike Elliott
- James Ernest
- Don Featherstone
- Nigel Findley
- Richard Garfield
- Don Greenwood
- Ed Greenwood
- Julie Guthrie
- E. Gary Gygax
- Tracy Hickman
- John Hill
- David Isby
- Steve Jackson (US)
- Jennell Jaquays
- Reiner Knizia
- Wolfgang Kramer
- Eric M. Lang
- Rick Loomis
- Rodger MacGowan
- Tom Meier
- Marc Miller
- Dennis Mize
- Alan R. Moon
- Sandy Petersen
- Michael Pondsmith
- Alex Randolph
- Charles Roberts
- Sid Sackson
- Duke Seifried
- Tom N. Shaw
- Redmond Simonsen
- Kenneth St. Andre
- Michael Stackpole
- Greg Stafford
- Lisa Stevens
- Klaus Teuber
- Don Turnbull
- Jonathan Tweet
- Jim Ward
- Margaret Weis
- Jordan Weisman
- Loren Wiseman
- Reinhold Wittig
- Erick Wujcik
- Lou Zocchi

=== Games and publications ===
- Ace of Aces
- Acquire
- Advanced Dungeons & Dragons *
- Amber Diceless Roleplaying
- Apples to Apples
- Axis & Allies
- Battletech Mechs & Vehicles
- Berg's Review of Games
- BoardGameGeek
- Call of Cthulhu
- Champions
- Chivalry & Sorcery
- Cosmic Encounter
- The Courier
- Diplomacy
- Dragon Magazine
- Dungeons & Dragons *
- Empire
- Fire & Movement Magazine
- GURPS
- Illuminati play-by-mail game
- Mage Knight
- Mage Knight Board Game
- Magic: The Gathering
- Middle-Earth Play-By-Mail
- Mythos
- Nuclear War
- Paranoia
- Risk
- The Settlers of Catan
- Squad Leader
- Star Fleet Battles
- Strategy & Tactics
- Traveller
- TwixT
- Vampire: The Masquerade
- Warhammer Fantasy Battle
- Warhammer 40,000
- Yahtzee

* - Dungeons & Dragons and Advanced Dungeons & Dragons were deemed different enough to be inducted on separate occasions.

== See also ==
- Charles S. Roberts Award
- Spiel des Jahres
- Diana Jones Award
- ENNIE Awards
- Indie Game Developer Network Award
- List of Game of the Year awards
