= Galaxy: The Dark Ages =

2000 card game by GMT Games

Galaxy: The Dark Ages is a 2000 card game published by GMT Games.

== Gameplay ==
Galaxy: The Dark Ages is a game in which eight alien races face a challenge to see which three will survive. It is the successor of Titan: The Arena.

== Reviews ==
- Pyramid
- Backstab
