= Speed Circuit =

Avalon Hill edition, 1977

Speed Circuit is a Formula I racing game published by 3M in 1971, and then republished by Avalon Hill in 1977.

== Description ==
Speed Circuit is a racing game for 2-6 players (with an option to add up to six more players). Drivers customize their cars and then race them on a variety of Formula I tracks.

=== Components ===
The Avalon Hill edition includes:

- four piece folding mounted 32" x 22" game board with three Formula I race courses ( Monaco, Monza and Watkins Glen.)
- six cars (metal in the original edition, plastic in subsequent printings)
- pad of player logs
- 4-page rulesheet
- six-sided die

=== Building cars ===
Each player starts with a car with a Start Speed of 40 mph, Acceleration and Deceleration of 20 mph, Top Speed of 140 mph, and 4 Wear Points. Each player has a pool of 5 points. Using a pool of 5 points, each player spends 0, 1 or 2 points on each of those categories, resulting in:

- Start Speed (40, 60 or 80 mph)
- Acceleration (20, 40 or 60 per turn)
- Deceleration (20, 40 or 60 per turn)
- Top Speed (140, 160 or 180 mph)
- Wear Points (4, 5 or 6)

=== Setup ===
The players select which of the three tracks to use, and how many laps each race will be. Start position is determined by start speed — the player with the highest start speed gets the inside lane front row start position. The second fastest start speed gets the middle lane front row, and so on. If two or more players have the identical start speed, their order is determined randomly.

=== Start ===
The players write down their speed for the first turn (their listed Start Speed) on their player log. A player can choose to increase their start speed by 20 mph, but risks stalling (rolling a 5 or a 6 on a die), which leaves them on the start line until the second turn. The driver can again try to increase start speed by 20 mph on the second turn, but a car that stalls two turns in a row is out of the race. The car in the lead moves first, moving 1 square ahead for every 20 mph of speed. The second car then moves, and so on. A car cannot voluntarily leave the track if its path is blocked by another car — a collision results instead.

=== Race ===
Once all players have had their first turn, each player secretly records their speed for the next turn, which can be the same as the previous turn, or increased in increments of 20 mph up to the maximum acceleration and Top Speed of the car, or decreased in increments of 20 mph up to the maximum deceleration of the car. Once again the lead car moves first, followed by each car in order. Once speeds have been revealed, cars must travel that speed, and cannot accelerate or decelerate to avoid a collision.

=== Accelerating and decelerating ===
To change the speed of the car, the player marks a new speed for the coming turn in accordance with the car's maximum acceleration and deceleration. The driver can exceed maximum acceleration by 20 mph, but risks engine damage. Similarly, the driver can exceed maximum deceleration by up to 80 mph, but depending by how much, may result in a loss of Wear Points, and may cause the car to "spin out" (come to a stop and be forced to start the next turn from a standing start).

=== Cornering ===
Speed limits are posted in corner spaces. In addition, a long arrow is drawn through each corner. Any car entering a space above the limit risks losing Wear Points, spinning out, or crashing out of the race. A car that follows an arrow through the corner from begeinning to end can take the corner at 20 mph above the speed limit without penalty.

=== Slipstreaming ===
If a car starts the turn behind another car, both are on a straightaway, and the trailing car is going the same speed or less than the lead car, then the driver of the trailing car can elect to slipstream. The trailing car adds 20 mph to its speed if the lead car is moving at 120 to 160 mph, and adds 40 mph if the lead car is travelling 180 mph.

=== Collisions ===
If a car collides with another car, the car causing the collision spins out and must start the next turn from a standing start. The car that was hit continues the race with no penalty.

=== Victory conditions ===
The first car to cross the finish line is the winner. If two cars cross the finish line on the same turn, the car that travelled the furthest past the finish line is the winner. If both cars travelled the same distance, then the car that crossed the line first is the winner.

== Publication history ==
Speed Circuit was originally designed and published by 3M in 1971.

Avalon Hill acquired the rights and Don Greenwood redeveloped the game before it was re-released in 1977 with six metal cars. Players could order six extra cars from Avalon Hill to enable games with up to twelve players, and could also order 15 additional tracks to supplement the three included in the game. Avalon Hill re-released the game in 1989, replacing the metal cars with plastic cars.

In 1991, the German game company Klee produced a German-language edition.

In 2016 UltraPro ran a Kickstarter to publish a revision of the game under the new title Championship Formula Racing. The new edition was subsequently published in 2017 and continues to be played in a number of Play-by-eMail and in-person events including new leagues based in Detroit and San Marino.

== Reception ==
Games included Speed Circuit in its top 100 games of 1986, saying, "The tricky part is predicting what other drivers will do while you look for openings in the pack. Luck plays almost no role in this test of racing skills on three famous tracks."

In Issue 6 of Games International, Pete Birks compared five of the most popular car racing games, and said of Speed Circuit that it "tries hardest to be realistic." Birks had several recommendation for best play, saying, "An entire article could be written on the optimal use of [corner] arrows (particularly on the nasty second and third bends on the Monaco track) but, put simply, use them when you can. Always look at least one turn ahead, and try to dominate the play. If you can get the inside line at a vital point in the game, the use of two wear points may be worthwhile." He also noted "A single error (often one down to guesswork when another player has a choice of speeds and you have to guess which one he will choose) can lose a player a game."

In A Player's Guide to Table Games, John Jackson noted, "The advantage lies with the faster, inside cars, but outguessing your opponents in the corners — deciding when to stay on the outside and keep your speed up, when to cut inside, and when to use your wear allowance — is a real challenge."

== Reviews ==
- Games and Puzzles
- Games & Puzzles #40
- 1980 Games 100 in Games
- 1981 Games 100 in Games
- 1982 Games 100 in Games
- Jeux & Stratégie #11
- The Playboy Winner's Guide to Board Games
