= Outreach (board game) =

Science fiction board game published in 1976

The Conquest of the Galaxy, 3000AD
- Cover art by Redmond A. Simonsen
- Designers: Irad Hardy
- Publishers: SPI
- Publication: January 1, 1976; 50 years ago
- Years active: 1976 to 1982
- Genres: Board game, Wargame
- Players: 1 to 4
- Playing time: 6 or more hours
- Chance: some
- Skills: Strategy
- Materials required: pens and paper

Outreach, subtitled "The Conquest of the Galaxy, 3000 AD", is a science fiction board wargame published by SPI in 1976 that simulates galactic empire building.

== Description ==
Outreach is a 1–4 player game in which each player represents a faction trying to rule the galaxy through the building of stargates and the resultant harvesting of resources, which enable expansion and the construction of more stargates.

Outreach is an example of the empire-building genre that in the early 1990s would come to be known as 4X ( "EXplore, EXpand, EXploit and EXterminate").

== Gameplay ==
Outreach is played in the game universe introduced in Starforce: Alpha Centauri, where starflight is achieved through telepathy (Note: In a fashion similar to Dune.) The game's fleets and stargates demonstrate massed sentient activity that powers movement.

The Outreach playfield consists of a hex map covering approximately 1/3 of the galaxy. Hexes on the majority of the map are of one of three types, differing in their stellar density and the types of resources. There are an additional two types of hexes in the galactic core. Each hex is about 1200 light years across, so different race's fleets can inhabit a single hex without meeting. Combat can only be achieved by first finding the opposing force, which is subject to a number of factors.

Fleets are represented by a single marker on the map, but contain multiple ships of three basic types. The details of the fleet makeup are recorded separately which adds a level of bookkeeping to the gameplay. Ship movement is effected by random events that may cause a fleet to "scatter" and be lost, so traveling long distances is very difficult until the player improves their tech level. There are a number of random events like these in the game, but they can be affected by the user spending their resources so the outcomes are rarely purely random.

As is the case of the related game, StarForce, the game ultimately proceeds by building StarGates, space stations that lay claim to a hex. These generate resources which are used to build tech levels, fleets and affect the outcome of the random events.

== Publication history ==
In 1974, SPI published Starforce: Alpha Centauri, the wargaming industry's first mass-market science fiction wargame, and it proved to be a big hit. In 1976, SPI attempted to repeat this success with Outreach, designed by Irad Hardy and using the same galactic setting as Starforce. Outreach also was popular, rising to #4 on SPI's Top Ten Bestseller list the month it was released, and staying in the Top Ten for the next six months.

== Reception ==
In his 1977 book The Comprehensive Guide to Board Wargaming, Nicholas Palmer noted that "various plausible scenarios feature, with an entertaining diplomacy rule whereby both players benefit if both vote for cooperation, but each may stand to gain from aggression, either as a surprise stab or a pre-emptive strike."

Lynn Willis reviewed Outreach in The Space Gamer No. 9. Willis concluded that "Outreach is highly playable and wildly variable. Counting time in centuries, it is logical, realistic [...] and evocative. The components are a very high quality."

In Issue 8 of Phoenix, Stuart McGregor thought "The play of the game is very simple." He also liked the use of Fate in the game, calling it "an interesting aspect of the game." However, he found the quality of printing on the die-cut counters "below normal SPI standards." Nonetheless McGregor concluded with a strong recommendation, saying, "I consider Outreach to be one of SPI's best games, and well worth the money."

Eric Goldberg reviewed Outreach in Ares Magazine #1, rating it a 6 out of 9. Goldberg commented that "Outreach has enough play value to entertain the first few times it is played, but then degenerates into a mathematical puzzle. Still, the ideas and general direction of the design allow the enterprising player to design a much better game."

In the 1980 book The Complete Book of Wargames, game designer Jon Freeman was ambivalent, saying, "The board is striking — almost dazzling, and the game is fun to play. But. It takes too long, particularly the multiplayer scenarios, which are potentially the most enjoyable. If the initial movement allotment were higher, the game would develop faster and be more like World II than World War I — but it isn't." He also noted that "As in nearly all games of this general sort, there is considerable bookkeeping involved, and it's easy to make errors that can get so compounded the final outcome is meaningless for all concerned." Freeman also thought the chance factor was too high. Freeman gave this game an Overall Evaluation of "Good", concluding, "Despite all that and some flat contradictions in the rules, this game can be a pleasant way to spend a Saturday — if you don't take your gaming too seriously."

== Other reviews and commentary ==
- Moves #26
- Games & Puzzles #69
