= Caesar (board game) =

Board game

1st edition rulebook by Robert Bradley, 1970

Caesar, subtitled "Epic Battle of Alesia", is a board wargame self-published as "Alesia" by Robert Bradley in 1970, and then republished by Avalon Hill in 1976. The game simulates the ancient Battle of Alesia.

== Background ==
In 52 BC, during the Gallic Wars, the Roman army of Julius Caesar besieged the Gauls' leader Vercingetorix in the oppidum (fortified settlement) of Alesia. However, the Romans themselves were besieged by a large force of Gauls,. The Romans, building a defensive wall to protect them, defeated the relief force and forced the surrender of Vercingetorix.

== Description ==
Caesar is a two-player wargame, in which one player controls the Romans besieging Alesia, the other player controls the Gauls trying to simultaneously break out of Alesia, and attack the Romans from without.

=== Components ===
- 28" x 33" mounted hex grid map
- 408 die-cut counters
- rule book

=== Gameplay ===
The basic concept of the game is the double siege, with Roman lines facing both inwards around Alesia, and outwards against Gallic relieving forces. The exact lines of the fortifications are preprinted on the game board; the Roman player starts by placing all the Roman counters, which may go anywhere outside Alesia, although there are advantages to placing them along the fortification lines. The Gallic player then places some counters inside Alesia, along with the counter representing Vercingetorix, and keeps the remainder offboard.

The game lasts a maximum of 24 turns, divided into two "Assault Periods" of 12 turns each, representing the two days of the battle. During each turn, the Gallic player moves on-board units, then the off-board units (showing the other player the locations but not the numbers of the units off-board), then resolves combat with adjacent Roman units. The Roman player then moves their units and resolves the resulting combat.

=== Victory conditions ===
The Gallic player wins if Vercingetorix escapes from Alesia and is moved off the board. However, if during the escape the Roman player is able to place a Roman unit adjacent to Vercingetorix, the Roman player wins.

Avalon Hill edition, cover art by Al Eckman, 1977

== Publication history ==
In 1970, Dr. Robert Bradley designed and self-published Alesia, a game about the Battle of Alesia. The game was quite large, with over 1000 counters and a map more than 4 ft (1.3 m) long. Richard Berg called its rules "less than polished." Bradley revised the game and released a second version in 1971 with a slightly smaller map. In 1973, Charles Pasco announced that he had purchased the rights to the game and would publish it under the name Thesis Games, but he was never able to bring the game to market, and eventually sold the rights to Avalon Hill. Donald Greenwood revised the rules, reduced the number of counters to 400, and reduced the size of the map even further. The result, Caesar: Epic Battle of Alesia, was released in 1977 with cover art by Al Eckman.

== Reception ==
In Issue 13 of Perfidious Albion, Charles Vasey and Geoff Barnard discussed this game. Barnard commented, "This is a real 'blood and guts' game in that the Gallic player has to throw everything into the attack with almost complete disregard for casualties, as they do not matter, and he has that much missile-fodder (or so it seems at the start). The game is, therefore, great fun for the Gaul even though his men can die like flies." Vasey replied, "Certainly not a game in the old tradition of Avalon Hill. The Romans are almost totally useless if it was not for their missile troops and the rule that allows them to automatically kill Gallic units surrounded by zones of control and attacked at 2:1 ... The victory conditions are sensible and the best player wins."

In his 1977 book The Comprehensive Guide to Board Wargaming, Nicky Palmer called the original amateur edition by Robert Bradley "much admired." He warned that despite the Gauls' huge advantage in numbers, "inspired leadership give the Romans a fair chance despite a 6–1 numerical inferiority." He concluded that the game was "moderately complex, with a rich variety of units." In his 1980 sequel, The Best of Board Wargaming, Palmer added "One of the most original games ever designed, with a strong flavour of the tactical situation facing Julius Caesar." He concluded by giving the game an excellent "excitement" grade of 90%, saying, "Even if the Gauls lose two to three hundred combat factors they may still win!"

In the 1980 book The Complete Book of Wargames, Jon Freeman called it "one of the few legends in wargaming" for its relatively simple rules that still result in a tense and suspenseful game.

In Issue 29 of Moves (October–November 1976), Richard Berg thought the quality of the components was average, but said they stood "second fiddle to the game itself, which is terrific." Berg liked that Roman troops cannot defend everywhere at once, and noted that because of that, "the game soon becomes a fierce struggle of sudden attacks and well-thought-out strategies." Although he noted some rule problems, he thought generally that "the rules are fairly clear, and the moderate complexity belies the problems confronting each player." He concluded with a strong recommendation, calling Caesar "an unusually exciting game, and one that can be played by 3 or 4 as easily as 2."

== Other reviews and commentary ==
- Boardgamer Vol.2 No. 3
- Campaign No. 76
- Fire & Movement No. 22
- Line of Departure No. 42
- Moves No. 48, p13-17
- Paper Wars No. 49
- The Wargamer Vol. 1 No. 2
- Panzerfaust and Campaign No. 76
