= Turning Point: Stalingrad =

1989 board wargame

- Designers: Don Greenwood
- Publishers: Avalon Hill
- Publication: 1989
- Genres: World War II

Turning Point: Stalingrad is a board wargame published by Avalon Hill in 1989 that simulates street-to-street fighting during the Battle of Stalingrad. The game is the third in a series of games using an innovative "Impulse Area" system.

== Background ==
At the start of Operation Barbarossa, Germany's invasion of the Soviet Union, Stalingrad (now Volgograd) was the largest industrial center of the Soviet Union and an important transport hub on the Volga River; controlling Stalingrad meant gaining access to the oil fields of the Caucasus and having supreme authority over the Volga. The city was therefore one of Germany's key objectives, and one that the Soviet Union could not afford to lose.

== Description ==
Turning Point: Stalingrad is a two-player game where one player controls German forces trying to take Stalingrad, and the other player controls Soviet defenders. The game system has been deliberately simplified, requiring only ten pages of rules. The game includes a 16" x 44" mounted map of a portion of Stalingrad, scaled at 1":500m (1:20,000). The map lacks the hex grid overlay common to most board wargames of the time. Instead, Stalingrad is divided into 74 different areas, color-coded for terrain. Also included are almost 400 double-sided counters.

=== Initiative versus "tactical advantage" ===
During each turn, one player will have initiative (they move first), while the other player will have "tactical advantage" (at any time, they can force a re-roll of all dice during a single combat, hoping to achieve a more favorable result). In doing so, the player must abide by the second set of dice rolls; and the players immediately trade tactical advantage and initiative. The German player by default starts each turn with initiative unless the Soviet player has ceded "tactical advantage" to the German player during a previous turn, in which case the Soviet player has initiative.

=== Gameplay ===
The player with initiative can move or fire one or more units in one area. The counters that were moved or fired are then flipped over to indicate they are "committed" for the rest of the turn. The reverse side of each counter does not show the unit's offensive strength or movement, only its defensive strength, which is reduced due to the unit's previous exertions. Once the active player is finished with that area, the second player gets the same opportunity to act. When play returns to the first player, the player cannot return to the first area, but must focus on another area.

Impulses alternate between the two players until both pass on the opportunity for further action, either because all of their counters are "committed", they have moved or fired at least one unit in every area, or for tactical reasons. This is the end of the game turn; the final action is that Close Combat occurs in all areas containing units of both sides, which continues until one side or the other is eliminated from the area. Each turn represents a day of game time, divided into daytime impulses and nighttime impulses. At the start of German impulses — which are numbered 1–12 during daytime and 3–12 during night — the German player rolls two dice. If the number is less than or equal to the impulse number, then if it is a day impulse, the day ends at the end of the German impulse, and becomes night; if it was a night impulse, then at the end of the German impulse, a new day (and a new game turn) dawns. Since the German victory conditions are contingent on gaining a certain number of areas by the end of the week, this sudden advance in time can squeeze the German player for time.

==== Day versus night ====
The Germans can only use aircraft by day, and German artillery loses effectiveness at night. During the night, Soviets units can infiltrate German-occupied areas without penalty.

==== Movement ====
Counters moved from the same area do not have to have the same destination. Moving into a unoccupied costs fewer Movement Points (MPs); moving into or adjacent to an area occupied by enemy units costs more MPs. Units that move into an enemy-occupied area must stop. Units that move cannot fire during the rest of this game turn.

==== Combat ====
Units in an area that do not move can fire at declared targets in the same area or adjacent areas. If there are both committed (turned over) counters and uncommitted counters in an area, the firing player must fire on one type or the other, but not both. Units that have fired cannot move for the rest of the game turn.

For every attack, each opponent rolls two dice, adds the result to the attack potential of the firing unit or the defense potential of the unit under fire, and adds some modifications. If the defender's total is higher, the shot has no effect. Otherwise, the difference between the two rolls represents the number of loss points inflicted on the defender. The defender can then choose between suffering these loss points in the form of a retreat or as actual losses. For example, a stack of three units suffering three losses could choose to retreat.

=== Special rules ===
There are a number of special rules that deal with supply, Soviet armor replacements from the Dzerhezinsky tractor works, rubble, artillery, the Luftwaffe and reinforcements.

=== Victory conditions ===
The German player is given a target number of areas to be captured by the end of the week. At the end of seven days, if the German player has captured more objectives than required, then they win the game. If less than the requirement, then the Soviet player wins. If the German player has just equaled the victory requirement, the game continues for another week.

=== Scenarios ===
The game comes with

- a short introductory scenario, designed to teach the rules
- a long campaign scenario, which can be divided into several short scenarios.

== Publication history ==
In 1981, game designer Courtney Allen wanted "to create a game where players could fully concentrate on the different strategies rather than learning long pages of rules and tables." The result was Storm Over Arnhem, published by Avalon Hill in 1981. The game with its simplified "Area Impulse" rules proved popular, and Avalon Hill published three more games using the same rules system: Thunder at Cassino, Breakout: Normandy, and Turning Point: Stalingrad. The latter was designed by Don Greenwood, and was published in 1989.

== Reception ==
In Issue 9 of the British games magazine Games International, Ellis Simpson praised the game components, calling the counter graphics "brilliantly clear and beyond reproach." Simpson admitted that with the potential end to each day via dice rolling, "[the game has] a huge luck factor. The test of the designer’s intention is whether or not this luck factor means that the game is simply about rolling dice. That is certainly not the case." Simpson concluded by giving the game a top rating of 5 out of 5, saying, "Of the year's wargame releases, this is my favourite and deserves to be yours too. Each playing is different, each turn within a game is different and no two games are ever going to be the same."

In Issue 65 of the French games magazine Casus Belli, Claude Esmein also found the components to be above average, writing, "The material contained in this (heavy) box is superb. The map, in particular, is a pure marvel." Esmain found the rules to be simple and easily understood.and concluded, "Turning Point: Stalingrad represents the culmination of the area-based game concept already encountered with Arnhem and Cassino; The natural boundary of the Volga River plays a large part in this success. A simple system full of uncertainty that renews the pleasure with each game, a tension that can be felt even solo, makes this game a must-play."

Games named Turning Point: Stalingrad as one of "The Year's Best Games of 1989", saying, "Turning Point: Stalingrad gives a fresh look and new treatment to this crucial battle in the Eastern Front. Instead of dividing the board into the usual hexagonal spaces, the game uses a point-to-point movement system, and the gameboard features an impressive view of the beleaguered streets and factories of the Russian city."

== Reviews ==
- Perfidious Albion #71 (p8-10)

== Awards ==
At the 1989 Charles S. Roberts Awards, Turning Point: Stalingrad was a finalist in the category "Best World War II Game".
