= 8th Army (board game) =

WWII board wargame

8th Army is a board wargame published by the British games company Attactix Adventure Games in 1982 that simulates the North African campaign during World War II.

== Background ==
Between December 1940 and January 1943, German-Italian forces fought for control of northwest Africa and the vital Suez Canal against Allied forces, notably the British Eighth Army.

== Description ==
8th Army is a 2-player wargame game in which one player controls Allied forces while the other player controls Axis forces. The various phases of the North African campaign from December 1940 to January 1943 are depicted.

The game has basic rules for beginners and more advanced rules for experienced players. While ground clashes occur on a large hex grid map, an additional mini-map simulates Mediterranean supply convoys and air movements.

The game is not complex and has been characterized as an introductory war game suitable for beginners.

== Publication history ==
Shaun Carter designed 8th Army and it was published by the British games company Attactix Adventure Games in 1982.

== Reception ==
In Issue 17 of the French games magazine Casus Belli, Frederic Blayo commented, "The game is balanced and fast, with an off-map movement system. Simple rules are illustrated with examples. Will not put off the beginner, but there are optional rules aimed at experienced players." Blayo concluded, "And above all, the presentation is very attractive and pleasant to play."

Norman Smith reviewed 8th Army for Games International magazine, and gave it 3 stars out of 5, and stated that "If you are interested in the wider aspects of land warfare by including the whole Mediterranean scene and the interrelationships between land, naval and air forces then 8th Army is a good buy."

== Other recognition ==
A copy of 8th Army is held in the "Ballam in John Johnson Collection" at the Bodleian Library.

== Other reviews and commentary ==
- Fire & Movement #40 & 43
- Games Review #8
