= Storm Over Arnhem =

1981 WWII board wargame

- Cover art by Rodger B. MacGowan
- Designers: Courtney Allen
- Illustrators: Rodger B. MacGowan
- Publishers: Avalon Hill
- Publication: 1981
- Genres: World War II

Storm Over Arnhem is a board wargame published by Avalon Hill in 1981 that simulates part of Operation Market Garden, the Allied attempt to seize a bridgehead over the Rhine River at Arnhem during World War II. The game, which features an innovative game system, won a Charles S. Roberts Award.

== Background ==
In August 1944, two months after the D-Day landings, the Allies finally broke out of the Normandy peninsula, and German forces rapidly retreated across the Netherlands and France towards the Rhine River, a natural defense. The Allies knew German troops would blow up the bridges across the Rhine once their forces had crossed. Operation Market Garden was a bold attempt by the Allies to circumvent this by landing elements of the British 1st Airborne Division behind German lines on the far side of the Rhine River at the Dutch town of Arnhem on 18 September 1944. The paratroops would then hold the Arnhem bridge for two days until the British XXX Corps broke through the German line and arrived to secure the bridge. Unfortunately the Allied planners had underestimated the strength of German forces guarding the road to Arnhem, and Allied forces were unable to penetrate the German line. This left the paratroops on their own to defend the bridgehead against a German battalion and two SS Panzer divisions.

== Description ==
Storm Over Arnhem is a two-player wargame in which one player controls British forces and the other player controls German forces. The game is not an operational overview of the entire Allied offensive, but a tactical game similar in size to a scenario of Squad Leader. The game system has been deliberately simplified, requiring only nine pages of rules.

At the start of the game, fifty counters of British paratroops are in control of about one-third of the town of Arnhem, awaiting counterattacks from 70 German counters. The British player tries to hold on to as much of the town as possible to the end of the game while minimizing losses; the German player tries to push the British back and take control of the town. There are no smaller scenarios, only the 8-turn main game to be played, each turn counting as either six hours of daylight or twelve hours of night.

The map of the town of Arnhem is not overlaid with the traditional hex grid used by other games of the period; instead, the town has been divided into small polygonal areas, and movement is made from area to area.

=== Set-up ===
An optional rule allows the players to make a secret bid on the right to play the British side. The winning bid is added to the German player's Victory Point total. For example, if the British player won with a bid of "4", the German player would start with 4 Victory Points. Negative bids — for example, "-2" — are allowed. If this was the successful bid, the German player would start the game with -2 Victory Points.

The British begin having control of twelve areas in the town — six on the perimeter, and six more centrally located. It is up to the British player to decide where to place units in these areas during initial set-up. Both players set up their initial forces secretly, the British player using the main map, and the German player using a smaller map. Once set up is complete, the German player moves their counters to the main map, and play begins.

Counters displaying obverse (colored background) and reverse (white)

=== Initiative versus "tactical advantage" ===
During each turn, one player will have initiative — the player moves first — while the other player will have "tactical advantage" — at any time, the player can force a re-roll of all dice during a single combat, hoping to achieve a more favorable result. In doing so, the player must abide by the second set of dice rolls; and the players immediately trade tactical advantage and initiative. The German player by default starts each turn with initiative unless the British player has ceded "tactical advantage" to the German player during a previous turn, in which case the British player would have initiative.

=== Gameplay ===
Each game turn begins with a random event, which could be unexpected reinforcements to either side, ammunition arriving for the British, etc.

The rest of the game turn is taken up by Movement and Combat, which are combined in the form of an indeterminate number of "impulses".

The player with initiative can move or fire one or more units in one area. The counters that were moved or fired are then flipped over to indicate they are "committed" for the rest of the turn. The reverse side of each counter does not show the unit's offensive strength or movement, only its defensive strength, which is usually reduced due to the unit's previous exertions. Once the active player is finished with that area, the second player gets the same opportunity to act. When play returns to the first player, the player cannot return to the first area, but must focus on another area.

Impulses alternate between the two players until both pass on the opportunity for further action, either because all of their counters are "committed", they have moved or fired at least one unit in every area, or for tactical reasons. This is the end of the game turn; the final action is that Close Combat occurs in all areas containing units of both sides, which continues until one side or the other is eliminated from the area. Victory Points gained by the German player during the turn are then added up, and play moves to the next game turn.

==== Movement ====
Counters moved from the same area do not have to have the same destination. Each unit uses one Movement Point (MP) to move into an unoccupied or friendly adjacent area, but 4 MPs to move into an area during daytime that already holds one or more enemy units. Usually, units that move into an enemy-occupied area must stop. Units that move cannot fire at this time.

==== Combat ====
Units in an area that do not move can fire at declared targets in the same area or adjacent areas. If there are both committed (turned over) counters and uncommitted counters in an area, the firing player must fire on one type or the other, but not both. German units that are eliminated are removed from the game, while British units have a chance to regroup. Units that have fired cannot move for the rest of the game turn.

For every attack, each opponent rolls two dice, adds the result to the attack potential of the firing unit or the defense potential of the unit under fire, and adds some modifications. If the defender's total is higher, the shot has no effect. Otherwise, the difference between the two rolls represents the number of loss points inflicted on the defender. The defender can then choose between suffering these loss points in the form of a retreat or as actual losses. For example, a stack of three units suffering three losses could choose to retreat.

=== Special rules ===
There are a number of special rules that deal with strategic movement zones, tanks and anti-tank units, artillery units and spotting, fire-setting by the Germans, and British ammunition shortages later in the game.

=== Victory conditions ===
Only the German player earns Victory Points:

- The German player earns Victory Points for occupying any of the six British perimeter areas by the end of Turn 3.
- From Turn 4 to Turn 8, the German player only earns Victory Points for holding any of the six inner British areas at the end of each turn.
- The German player earns no Victory Points scored for eliminating British units.

At the end of the game, the German player must have a score of at least 22 points to win — anything less than that is a British victory.

=== Variant scenario ===
The game comes with a number of counters that are not used in Storm Over Arnhem. Several months after the release of the game, a variant scenario titled "The Crossing" was published in The General (Volume 19 No.1) that included the unused counters in simulating the costly reconnaissance of the Arnhem bridge by the German 9th SS Panzer Division, which was repulsed by the British with heavy losses.

== Publication history ==
Game designer Courtney Allen, who created scenarios for Avalon Hill's Squad Leader, wanted to try something different, saying that he wanted "to create a game where players could fully concentrate on the different strategies rather than learning long pages of rules and tables." The result was Storm Over Arnhem, published by Avalon Hill in 1981 as a boxed set with cover art by Rodger B. MacGowan. The game with its simplified "Area Impulse" rules proved popular, and Avalon Hill published several more games using the same rules system including Thunder at Cassino, Turning Point: Stalingrad, and Breakout: Normandy.

In 1993, Avalon Hill republished Storm Over Arnhem packaged in a cardstock folio.

== Reception ==
In Issue 52 of the British wargaming magazine Perfidious Albion, Andrew Campbell and Geoffrey Barnard discussed Storm Over Arhem. Campbell remarked, "SoA is an easy to play, but quite realistic game. The move/fire system makes life easier in some respects but harder in others. The game flows well, but occasionally time is needed to think of what to do next ... The game provides quite a lot of excitement, [because] you are never sure of your opponents next move, and not always sure of committing units." Barnard replied, "On repeated playings with a number of opponents I have found this game to be a most impressive mix of play enjoyment and historical realism. Most of the former is in fact in the Move/fire sequence, as Andrew has suggested. Most of the latter is in fact hidden away in the structure of the game." Campbell concluded, "Overall, SoA is well worth playing again and is fairly quick, enjoyable and an exciting game." After pointing out some historical errors, Barnard concluded, "These points are relatively minor, and I do not think that they should detract from the overall game, which is excellent. It is probably historical enough, and is certainly fun enough."

Games named Storm Over Arnhem as one of their "Top 100 Games of 1982", saying, "The innovative 'staggered' movement and combat system in this atypical World War II simulation provides great depth of tactics without sacrificing playability." Games repeated this accolade a year later, naming Storm Over Arhem to their Top 100 of 1983.

In Issue 31 of The Wargamer, Jim Hind commented that "These eight turns will be packed with incident and excitement from start to finish. And the 3–4 hours you will spend playing it will be filled throughout with decisions pressing on you furiously, and above all, fast." Hind concluded, "[Designer] Courtney Allen's objective ... was to produce a players' game. By the yardstick of his intentions, I must report that Storm over Arnhem, in Montgomery's immortal words, is "90% successful."

In Issue 25 of the French games magazine Casus Belli, Frédéric Armand was disappointed that "While the game does feature three days of street fighting, the episodes involving the blockhouse [at the northern end of the bridge] and the ambush into which the SS reconnaissance battalion fell — brave moments from the film A Bridge Too Far, which inspired the game (just look at the box art) — are curiously absent." But otherwise, Armand enjoyed the game and concluded, "Storm Over Amhem is a game full of subtleties that can be played multiple times. It perfectly recreates the atmosphere of frustration and difficulty inherent in any urban combat. It's also a fast-paced game, and well-balanced." Nine years later, in Issue 79, Frank Stora reviewed the 1993 re-issue of the game and commented, "This game does not seek to compete with those that deal with the entire operation, since it is entirely devoted to a close-up of the fighting in Arnhem itself." Stora noted, "The 12 pages of rules, very clear, are not as quickly swallowed as one might think, because SoA is very different from the classic concepts of hexagons and zones of control." Stora concluded, "SoA's originality and appeal have earned it great success ... For those who aren't afraid of desperate causes (the task of the British paratroopers is truly daunting), this new edition is an opportunity to discover a highly original and undeniably effective game system at a low cost.

== Awards ==
At the 1982 Charles S. Roberts Awards, Storm Over Arnhem won in the category "Best 20th Century Boardgame of 1982".

== The General ==
Avalon Hill's house magazine The General published a series of articles on Storm Over Arnhem, including a variant to the game, as mentioned above. A two-part series replay was also printed.

- Volume 19, Number 1
  - "The Combatants of Arnhem" (contrasting approaches to Storm Over Arnhem)
  - "The Crossing" (variant rules)
  - Series replay
  - Design analysis
- Volume 19, Number 2
  - Series replay (part II)
- Volume 21, Number 1
  - "The Nieuwe Kade Gambit" (defensive set-up for the British)
- Volume 22, Number 3
  - "A Bridge Not Too Far" (British strategy for the variant)
- Volume 25, Number 3
  - "Prelude to the Storm Over Arnhem" (a historical perspective)
