= Counter (board wargames) =

Cardboard square representing a game item

Cardboard counters representing two units in the game Storm Over Arnhem. The two counters are double sided, and represent being "uncommitted" (left) or "committed" (right). The three numbers on uncommitted units are their attack, defence and movement scores, while committed units have a single "defence" score. The © symbol shows that the Bren carrier is a reinforcement unit.

A counter is usually a small cardboard square moved around on the map of a board wargame to represent relevant information or determine certain things. The first wargame based on cardboard counters was War Tactics or Can Great Britain Be Invaded? invented by Arthur Renals of Leicester in 1911. The first wargame bringing counters to a mass-market was Tactics, invented by Charles S. Roberts in 1952. Traditional wargames typically have hundreds of counters (The Russian Campaign, 225; GI: Anvil of Victory, 856; Terrible Swift Sword, 2,000). Squad Leader had counters of different sizes: 520 1/2-inch counters and 192 5/8-inch, with the different sizes used for different purposes.

Boardgame counters are often closely related to military map marking symbols, such as those seen in the NATO standard APP-6a, and often include a simplified APP-6a representation as part of the counter.

== Types ==
Smaller informational damage ("schaden") markers placed over unit counters in a wargame

- Representational counters, usually called "unit" counters, directly represent a unit, individual, vehicle, or weapon.
- Informational counters do not represent a specific type of character, unit, or weapon, but describe a state such as destroyed, immobilized, out of ammunition, captured, etc. These are sometimes called "markers", or "system counters" (for example, a counter used on a turn record track) as they aid in managing systemic elements of the game such as length.
- Chits are not directly representational or informational, but are used to determine things such as turn order. For example, in Air Baron, player-coded chits are drawn from a cup sequentially to determine the order of play.

== Variations ==
In microgames, counters were printed on one or more sheets of thick paper which the player had to cut for themselves rather than the die-cut cardboard sheets included with most board wargames. Dragon Magazine used to include counters printed on a cardstock centerfold for monthly games (especially by Tom Wham).

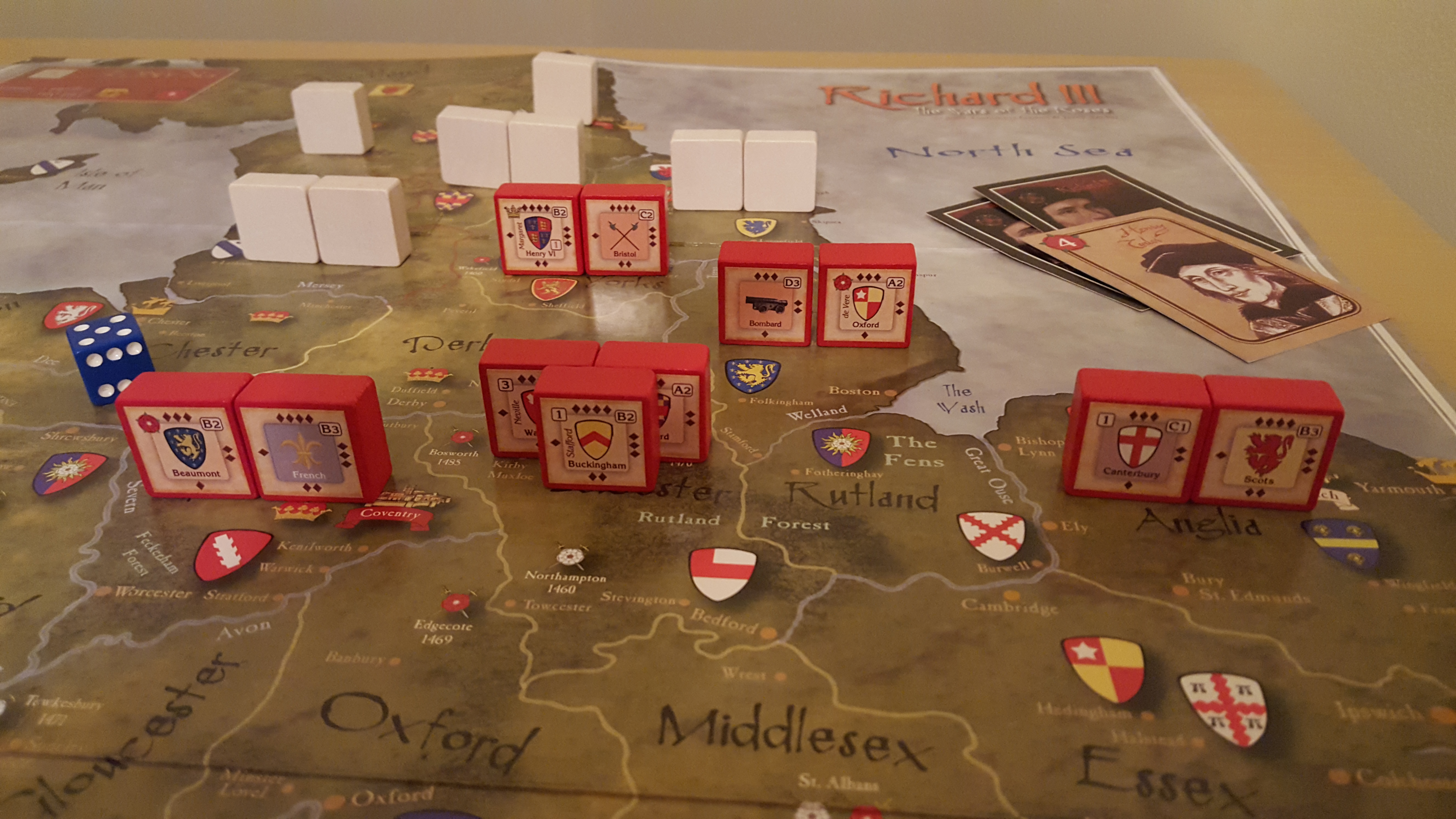
A set up of "Richard III", a block wargame

In block wargames, wooden blocks are used instead of cardboard as the counters to represent pieces, in order to emulate the fog of war (by placing the blocks upright to make the information visible to only one of the players). Often, when units take damage, the counter is rotated to signify the units new attack strength.

Although counters are typically square, some games use oblong rectangles as counters for individual ships, as in Flying Colors, or for land units in tactical-scale games when the designer wishes to emphasize the facing or linearity of the unit, as in the Great Battles of History series. Other variations are of course possible. The unit counters in Luftwaffe are circular, while one game covering the Eastern Front in World War II had hexagonal counters.
