= Titan: The Arena =

Card game

Titan: The Arena is a card game that was published by The Avalon Hill Game Company in 1993.

== Gameplay ==
Titan: The Arena is a game in which eight fantasy creatures compete in an arena.

== Publication history ==
It was republished by Fantasy Flight Games under the title Colossal Arena in 2004. A reimagination of the game was published in 2021 by Plan B Games under the title Equinox.

== Reception ==
The reviewer from Pyramid #29 (Jan./Feb., 1998) stated that "Titan - the Arena is a very good game".

== Reviews ==
- Dragon #243 (January 1998)
- Backstab #8
