= USS Anzio =

Two ships of the United States Navy have been named Anzio, in memory of the World War II landings at Anzio.

- USS Anzio (CVE-57), was an escort aircraft carrier originally commissioned as Coral Sea in August 1943, renamed Anzio in September 1944, and decommissioned in August 1946.
- USS Anzio (CG-68), was a guided missile cruiser commissioned in May 1992 and decommissioned in September 2022.
