= Outdoor Survival =

Board game

- Designers: Jim Dunnigan
- Publishers: Avalon Hill
- Publication: 1972
- Genres: Family

Outdoor Survival is a board game published by Avalon Hill in 1972 that simulates wilderness survival.

== Description ==
Outdoor Survival is a board game for 1 to 4 players (depending on the scenario chosen). The three-piece hex grid map covers 13,200 square miles of wilderness with a variety of terrain.

Each player has a set of six numbered counters that shows their character's current "life level", from full health (6) to immobile (1). In order to maintain a high life level, the character must find food and/or water each turn. Some hexes are special food sources, while hexes containing rivers and catch-basins are sources of water.

Movement in clear terrain and on trails is only 1 point per hex, but woods and desert cost 2 per hex, mountains and forests cost 3, and swamps cost 4 per hex. A character's direction of movement on the map is determined by a die roll:

- On a 1: The character moves in the direction chosen by another die roll, and will not be able to change direction.
- 2 or 3: The character must start in the direction determined by another die roll, but may change direction once during their movement, and then continue in the new direction in a straight line until their movement is finished.
- 4, 5, or 6: The character can choose any direction, but can only move in a straight line.

=== Scenarios ===
The game comes with four scenarios:

- "Lost": This is usually a solitaire scenario, although up to four can play. The character starts at the center of the board at full health and then tries to move off any edge of the board. If the health of the character degrades to "Immobile" before reaching the edge of the map, the player loses.
- "Survival": A race between 2–4 players from one edge of the board to the other. Food and water collection is a bit easier -- rather than having to end the turn on a source, the character can collect food or water by passing through that hex. Remaining on a food or water source for three turns returns that character to full health.
- "Search": Players race to find a lost person. The characters and the "lost" counter are randomly placed on the board. The character reaching the "lost" counter first is the winner.
- "Pursue": The players are divided equally into "escapees" and "guards", and are placed on the board randomly. The winner is either the first escapee to exit from any edge of the board, or the first guard to capture an escapee.

== Publication history ==
Outdoor Survival was designed by Jim Dunnigan, and published by Avalon Hill in 1972. It comes with three full-color interlocking, folding maps; some cards; and rules. The game became one of Avalon Hill's perennial bestsellers, with its success largely dependent on sales in outdoor gear stores, rather than traditional board game outlets.

== Legacy ==
Gary Gygax made use of Outdoor Survival in Dungeons & Dragons, even listing the game on the "Equipment" list in Volume I of the original 1974 edition of Dungeons & Dragons.

== Reception ==
Jon Freeman suggested that Outdoor Survival inspired several design choices used by Gary Gygax when creating the fantasy role-playing game Dungeons & Dragons, pointing out, "the game's 'life levels' seem to have inspired the experience levels used in D&D, and the wilderness mapboard was apparently used for overland adventures in early fantasy role-playing campaigns."

In Issue 13 of the French games magazine Jeux & Stratégie, Michel Brassinne suggested "Don't get as close as possible to a space containing water or food, since it is likely on the following turn that a die roll will force you to abruptly change direction, meaning (by evening) you still haven't restocked." Although Brassinne rated the game 8 out of 10 for presentation and clarity of rules, the game only elicited a rating of 1 heart out of 4 from Brassinne, who called it "A pleasant game, nothing more."

In a retrospective review of Outdoor Survival in Black Gate, John ONeill said "over time it became one of Avalon Hill's perennial bestsellers. Its success is attributed chiefly to the fact that it was sold outside regular channels — in outdoor equipment shops and the like — and because a whole generation of D&D players apparently thought of it as an essential component of any great wilderness adventure."
