= Undersea Warriors =

1975 WWII naval board wargame

Undersea Warriros
- Cover of the rulebook
- Publishers: Taurus Games
- Publication: 1975
- Genres: Naval combat

Undersea Warriors is a board wargame published by Taurus Games in 1975 that simulates combat between a submarine and a destroyer. Critics found the rulebook to be too long and badly organized.

== Description ==
Undersea Warriors is a two-player wargame in which one player controls a submarine, while the other controls a merchant convoy and destroyer escort. The game comes with two 19" x 24" square grid maps, one for each player, as well as plastic-coated diagrams of the submarine and destroyer, which are used for keeping track of damage. The rulebook is 144 pages, and contains technical information about submarines and antisubmarine warfare (ASW) from 1940 to 1960.

=== Gameplay ===
The players choose which era the submarine and destroyer are from: World War II, or early Cold War. The game is divided into ten "runs". The destroyer player sends a merchant convoy across the map while the destroyer searches for the submarine. The submarine player attempts to sink the merchant ships with torpedoes. The two players plan each turn for their vessels secretly, deploying each one on their separate maps. When the escort finds the submarine, a tactical one-on-one battle ensues. If the escort or the submarine is sunk, or the escort loses touch with the submarine, then a new convoy run is started.

The submarine player is awarded victory points for sinking merchant ships and destroyers, and the destroyer player is awarded victory points for sinking submarines. At the end of ten runs, whoever has accumulated the most points is the winner.

== Publication history ==
Undersea Warriors was created by Taurus Games, a game company based in Chicago that published a number of naval board wargames. The company advertised this game in wargame magazines in 1974 , but had difficulty fulfilling mail orders. Taurus demonstrated this game at Origins I in the summer of 1975, and had copies for sale. But following the game fair, they continued to have trouble fulfilling mail orders, and quickly went out of business.

== Reception ==
In Issue 10–11 of Europa, Tom Oleson wrote "The 144 pages of rules, historical commentary and designer's notes of UW is ... heavy going, because that is how we learn to play." Oleson was disappointed that only one-on-one combat was used, writing, "The use of single combatants is a limitation, since some of the more interesting ASW tactics are in coordinated efforts. Also, the aspects of coordinated (or at least simultaneous) sub attacks on the convoy and escorts are also not present." Although Oleson was impressed by the sheer body of research that had been done in order to provide technical notes on two decades of evolving submarine warfare, he questioned how accurate it could be. Oleson concluded, "I expect that naval buffs interested in ASW will be able to devise interesting games whether they bother to attempt to satisfy all of the intended rules or not. There is enough data and ideas to be able to play SOME type of ASW game. I cannot recommend [it to] the average gamer who wants to take this game out of the box and have at it with a brief rundown on the rules. In the same issue, Richard Mataka also found the rulebook an impediment to play, noting that it was "written in a narrative form and at times makes no sense at all. Normally, when I write a review about something, I want to say something good about it. The problem is that I have not been able to find anything good. I have been reading the rule book off and on and I still haven't figured out whether there is a game." Mataka concluded, "Taurus, who everyone thought was ripping us off [for failure to ship games that had been ordered] finally came out with a product but it looks as though in the long run we are still being ripped off because I sure can't locate a game in that entire mess."

In Issue 7 of Wargamer's Information, Scott Cardinell reported "The length of game ranges from a couple of hours upward, and requires a lot of record keeping and occasionally requires a judge, thus making it impractical to play with fewer than four people." Cardinell concluded, "The game offers considerably less than what was hoped for."
