= The Russian Campaign =

1974 WWII board wargame

Avalon Hill edition, 1977

The Russian Campaign is a strategic board wargame published by Jedko Games in 1974 that simulates combat on the Eastern Front during World War II. Avalon Hill bought the game in 1977 and produced several editions.

The unit scale is German Corps and Soviet Armies and roughly covers the Berlin to Gorki region (west to east) and Arkhangelsk to Grozny (north to south). A full campaign game covers the June 1941 to June 1945 period but numerous shorter scenarios are commonly played.

The system features a double-impulse movement system that simulates the German armored blitzkrieg into Western Russia, with mass breakthroughs and encirclements. The rules cover unit production with Russian "worker units" (which simulate both factories and fortifications in key cities), "Stuka" units representing German air strikes, partisans, rail movement, and weather rules. There are also several smaller scenarios detailing key periods during the campaign.

== Components ==
The game map represents the portions of the western Soviet Union and the Eastern European countries where the military campaign took place. It is overlaid by a hexgrid to standardize movement, and each hex is about 55 km across. Each turn of the game covers two months of the campaign, beginning with the German invasion on June 22, 1941. "The Russian Campaign" came in a color-printed cardboard box, with a fold-out, cardboard-backed game board (22" × 28"); Order of Battle cards giving the unit deployments for the German and Soviet players; a sheet of 225 chits, a set of rules, and a six-sided die.

The terrain types on the map include mountains, woods, swamp, rivers, and the Black and Baltic seacoasts. The map also includes significant cities, national boundaries, Soviet military district boundaries, as well as the major rail networks.

The die-cut cardboard counters are colored according to nationality, with field gray for German, light olive for German allies (Hungary, Romania, Italy and Finland with a letter indicating the nationality) and black for German SS units. Soviet tank corps and Guard armies (both infantry and tank) are printed in a lighter yellow than the Soviet cavalry and regular infantry (neither of which may move in the second impulse).

Each of the counters is printed with unit-specific information. This information includes the unit type, size, designation, combat factor, setup information and a movement factor. The unit type is indicated by a standard symbol, and the available types are Armor, Cavalry, Infantry, Mountain, Paratroop, and Panzer Grenadier (mechanized infantry). There are also markers for Soviet partisans and worker units, and for German Luftwaffe (air force) troops.

Most Soviet units, apart from those that set up in cities in the interior of the USSR, are set up in the Baltic, Western, Kiev (the strongest of the four) and Odessa Military Districts, within boundaries shown on the map. Several potential Soviet setups were published in the Avalon Hill "General" magazine. Most German forces set up in Germany (including occupied Poland), although some German forces set up in Romania.

Up to three of a player's corps, or two armies (or a corps and an army) can be stacked together at the end of a turn. Each of these unit counters has a zone of control, consisting of the up to six hexes surrounding its current location. As the units are moved about the map during game play, they must cease movement for the turn when they enter a zone of control of one of their opponent's units.

== Game play ==
A game of The Russian Campaign is normally played between two players, with one playing the side of Germany and its allies, and the other playing the side of the Soviet Union. The game is played in a series of turns, with the German player performing a sequence of actions followed by the Soviet player repeating the same sequence. After the German player has rolled to determine the weather, the game sequence proceeds as follows:

- Move your units
  - Position air units
  - Check for reinforcements, withdrawals, etc.
  - Railroad movement
- Attack enemy units
- Second Impulse - move units (if eligible) not in enemy zone of control
- Attack enemy units
  - Check if your units are out of supply

The Soviet player then repeats the same sequence.

=== Movement ===
Units are moved across the map by spending one or more of their movement allowance points to move from one hex to another hex. If a hex contains significant terrain, such as mountains, then movement ceases upon entry (except for mountain infantry). Movement is limited under certain weather conditions, determined by a die roll each turn. For example, "Mud" weather limits first impulse movement to 2 hexes for all units and prevents second impulse movement. Other weather types include "Light Mud" and "Snow," which halves all first impulse movement for all units and limits second impulse movement to one hex. Snow always occurs in January/February, but may also occur in November/December or (less likely) March/April.

The effect of weather rolls has a huge impact on the game, especially in 1941, when the German player might stymie his advance by rolling "Mud" in the autumn, yet also has a slim chance of rolling clear weather through to the end of the year (this is no longer possible in the L2 Edition), greatly increasing his chances of capturing Moscow. A common house rule to reduce the role of luck was to roll separately for each impulse, giving a slight advantage to the Soviet player who would know in advance what the weather for each impulse would be. Other proposals were aired in the "General" magazine, while the L2 edition uses a running die roll modifier in which bad weather makes good weather more likely in following turns, and (optionally) Soviet replacements are increased slightly in good weather and reduced in bad weather.

Soviet units are less mobile than German, as regular infantry are not eligible to move on the second impulse (German infantry may move 2 hexes in clear weather), and Soviet tank units may only move 2 hexes on the second impulse (German armor may move 4 hexes in clear weather).

=== Combat ===
If a unit ends its movement in a zone of control of the opponent's units, then those units must be attacked. (Not necessarily by every one of the player's units in the opponent's zone of control.) Each attack is performed separately by adding up the combat factors of the player's attacking units, then dividing by the combat factor of the opponent's units being attacked. This is then rounded down to a simple ratio, such as 2-to-1, 1-to-3, or 5-to-1. Higher odds improved the odds for a successful attack (typically you'd want odds of 3-to-1 or more to have better than 50% chance of success). Terrain features generally favored the defender by doubling their combat factor. Odds of 10-1 (or 7-1 plus a Stuka - see below) ensured an automatic victory, enabling the enemy unit to be removed straightaway from the game (and not eligible for replacement) during the movement phase and perhaps opening up a corridor that other friendly units might pass through.

The results of an attack are determined by rolling a six-sided die and then finding the result on the Combat results table. The results ranged from the attacking units being eliminated up to the defending units being eliminated or even surrendering (removed from the game altogether and may never be replaced). Between these extremes there are a range of intermediate results, including retreat by the attacker or defender, an exchange of losses, a combination of unit losses and a retreat, or "contact", meaning an unresolved outcome, and that the units simply remain adjacent to one another, with further combat being thus inevitable in the next turn or impulse.

=== Supply, air support and paratroops ===
Supply plays an important role during the game. Combat units must be able to trace a supply line to a friendly city or rail line (captured railway lines automatically convert to friendly control). Units out of supply have their combat rating halved. The first and second winters in Russia are particularly difficult for the German side, as supply is severely hindered during that period for units that are not close to a city.

German air supremacy early in the war - initially overwhelming but diminishing over time - is depicted by the use of "Stuka" units. In 1941 the German player receives three Stukas, or one in "Mud" turns (some players allowed the German player four Stukas in the opening turn), whereas in 1942 he receives two Stukas, or one in "Mud" turns, and in 1943 one Stuka in clear turns only. Stukas are never available in snow turns. Each Stuka must trace its air range to one of the three (North, Centre and South) German Army Group Headquarter counters. Adding a Stuka unit to a combat shifts the odds by 3 in the Germans' favor, i.e. a 2-1 becomes a 5-1 attack. The game also includes three optional Russian artillery units, each of which shifts the odds by 1, for use in the latter stages of the game, as well as a single German artillery unit available in 1942. The L2 version of the game allows the Russians to receive air support from "Sturmovik" units late in the game.

The Soviet player has three paratroop units, which may only drop during winter turns, and that must be dropped within range of the Soviet STAVKA headquarters unit. Paratroops are weak (combat factor of one, as opposed to three to eight or even ten for other units), but may be useful in cutting off German retreat. The Russian player also has three partisan counters, which may be deployed to cut railway lines, but that may not be deployed near an SS unit. The game also contains rudimentary rules for seaborne movement and invasions in the Black Sea and Baltic Sea.

Hitler and Stalin, who may only move by rail or seaborne movement, are also shown as counters in the game. Like STAVKA and the three German Army Group Headquarters, Hitler and Stalin are each assumed to have a combat strength of one.

=== Reinforcements and replacements ===
Each player has a schedule of reinforcements. Most German forces are present on the map to begin with, although some appear later in the game, including most of the SS corps. Italian units are removed in September 1943 at the point when the Western Allies are deemed to have landed in Italy. The German player also receives extra reinforcements at Warsaw and Bucharest when the Soviets draw near to these cities, or in the far north if Leningrad is captured by the Germans (representing Eduard Dietl's forces, which fought at Murmansk in reality). The USSR's forces are initially weak, but many new infantry armies are received in the autumn of 1941, and Guards Armies at regular intervals thereafter. The Soviet player starts the game with a three-factor worker unit in Moscow, and two-factor worker units in Leningrad, Kiev, Kharkov and Stalino (the latter three will probably be lost to German attacks), but receives nine more worker units (all but one of them single-factor) over the first year or so of the war.

The German player may replace one of each type of unit each year, although he may replace one panzer corps for each of the three oil wells on the map he controls—which means that unless he captures the two oil wells in the Caucasus he is limited to replacing one panzer corps for the oil well at Ploiești in Romania. All SS units may be replaced automatically.

The Soviet player receives replacement points each turn, one for each worker factor, and also (between January 1942 and January 1945) between one and six replacement points, determined by a die roll, of Allied aid via Murmansk - in the L2 edition this has now been fixed at three extra points per turn. Only one Russian tank (or Guards Tank) unit, and one Guards Infantry Army, may be replaced each turn. In 1943 the value of the Russian worker units (but not that of the Murmansk aid) is doubled, representing greater industrial mobilization and greater Allied Lend-Lease aid via Iran and Vladivostok.

Generally, the Germans have more powerful (at least in 1941) and more mobile units and are able to usually get more favorable odds in combat, but the Soviets are able to recreate their destroyed armies at a much faster rate and can thus afford the higher casualty rate that comes with the lower combat odds.

=== Victory conditions ===
The game's victory conditions have evolved slightly over the years. In the Avalon Hill version victory was obtained by capturing the enemy capital and eliminating the enemy leader counter, or by capturing all enemy cities (all but one in some versions, to prevent a defeated player avoiding defeat by holing up in Bucharest or Arkhangelsk). In the L2 version the German player wins by capturing Moscow and eliminating Stalin, or else by maintaining control of Berlin at the end of the game.

The game also contains "Sudden Death" victory conditions, by which each player may secretly select one of a menu of victory conditions that vary from year to year, and wins the game outright by controlling both his own and the enemy objective for that year. The idea is that this encourages a player to commit more resources than is objectively rational to a given objective, eg. the German offensive into the Caucasus in 1942, in the hope of winning an outright victory but risking catastrophic defeat in the event of failure. Under these rules, the game - if it followed the exact course of history - would end early in 1943 as the Soviet player would control both Stalingrad and the oil well at Maykop.

== Development history ==
- First Edition: Jedko Games, John Edwards, 1974. First issue had a flat box, and the undated map was in 2 flat sections, 50 x 30cm, using pale colors. A reissue in the same year came in a bookcase box, with identical rules, but a reformatted errata sheet glued to the rulebook, and with the map on 3 folded sections. The map was redrawn with terrain occupying the whole of the hexes, in bolder colors, and expanded 2 hexrows to the west and 1 to the east. It was also given a black border, so that the map consisted only of whole hexes, was dated 1974, and a new branch railway was added into the forest hex just south of Königsberg.
- Second Edition: Avalon Hill, Don Greenwood, 1977
- Third Edition: Avalon Hill, Richard Hamblen, 1978
- Fourth Edition: L2 Design Group, Tom Gregorio, 2003
- Southern Expansion: L2 Design Group, Art Lupinacci, 2004. An extension map covering the Caucasus and included additional rules and variants.
- Fifth Edition: Compass Games, 2021.

== Related games ==
In 1980 Avalon Hill also published "Fortress Europa", covering the Western Front from June 1944 to the end of the war. Although on a slightly smaller scale (divisions/brigades rather than corps/armies), the game was based on an essentially similar system to "The Russian Campaign", and indeed began with the German player setting up his divisions inside army districts along the French coast, similar to the Russian setup in Military Districts in "The Russian Campaign". "Paul Koenig's Fortress Europe", a revised version of "Fortress Europa", was published by Victory Point Games in 2016 and reprinted in 2017. A similar game covering the Italian campaign is under design. A "Designer Signature Edition" of the original "Fortress Europa" was published by Compass Games in 2019.

In the mid 1980s Avalon Hill also published "Russian Front", a game covering almost exactly the same topic as "The Russian Campaign", but with slightly more detail to the air war and very different combat mechanics. The game also looked very different as it featured a state of the art painted mapboard.

In 2004 L2 Design Group developed "Russia Besieged" based on the designer's experience with "The Russian Campaign". Similar in scale and scope, and openly acknowledging its debt to "The Russian Campaign", it adds additional chrome to the rules to provide additional realism to the simulation of this conflict. The game was republished by Compass Games in 2018.

== Reception ==
In a 1976 poll conducted by Simulations Publications Inc. to determine the most popular board wargames in North America, The Russian Campaign placed 128th out of 202 games.

In his 1977 book The Comprehensive Guide to Board Wargaming, Nicholas Palmer called this game "notable for lots of units, and a bloodthirsty [Combat Result Table]." He noted that Hitler and Stalin have their own counters "and the general effect is a lively 'fun' game rather than a deadly serious study of the war."

In The Guide to Simulations/Games for Education and Training, Martin Campion compared The Russian Campaign to rival games Barbarossa (SPI, 1969) and East Front (Excalibre Games, 1976), and concluded, "So far I am ranking this game third, but that is partly, I suspect, because I simply have not played it enough."

In the 1980 book The Complete Book of Wargames, game designer Jon Freeman questioned the historical accuracy of the game, saying "It's not really a simulation of World War II unless the players want it to be." He commented that "The systems in the game abstract most effects to a vast extent, but the end result, the feel for those effects, is most authentic. The Germans sweep through Russia during the early summers and cling desperately to their gains through the winters." Freeman gave this game an Overall Evaluation of "Very Good", concluding, "If you desire a simulation from which to study the unfolding of the invasion of Russia, The Russian Campaign is not it. But if you are looking for an effective and challenging reproduction of the campaign, with a multitude of options integrated into an extremely playable system for both face-to-face and solitaire gaming, you need look no further."

== Awards ==
- At the 1976 Origins Awards, The Russian Campaign won the Charles S. Roberts Award in the category "Best Strategic Game of 1975".
- The 4th edition published by L2 Design Group was a Charles S. Roberts Award finalist in two categories, "Best World War II Boardgame of 2003", and "Best Wargame Graphics of 2003."

== Reviews ==
- Casus Belli #12 (Dec 1982)
- Moves #36, p7-11
- Moves #50, p26
- Perfidious Albion #12 (December 1976) p.11
- Panzerfaust and Campaign #75

== See also ==
- Moscow '41
