= World Boardgaming Championships =

Boardgame convention

The World Boardgaming Championships (WBC) is a convention held annually since 1999 by the Boardgame Players Association. It was previously held in Lancaster, Pennsylvania, but moved to the Seven Springs Mountain Resort in 2016. It was last held from July 25 to August 2, 2026, at Seven Springs Mountain Resort near Pittsburgh, PA. This convention replaced Avaloncon, which had been run from 1991 to 1998 by Avalon Hill.

Each year, the convention pulls approximately 2,000 people from around the world to compete to be named champion of their favorite games. The 100 best-attended games from the previous convention (the “Century”) are scheduled, with additional games added by vote of BPA members and through sponsorships.

== See also ==
- Charles S. Roberts Award
