= Game Manufacturers Association =

Trade association

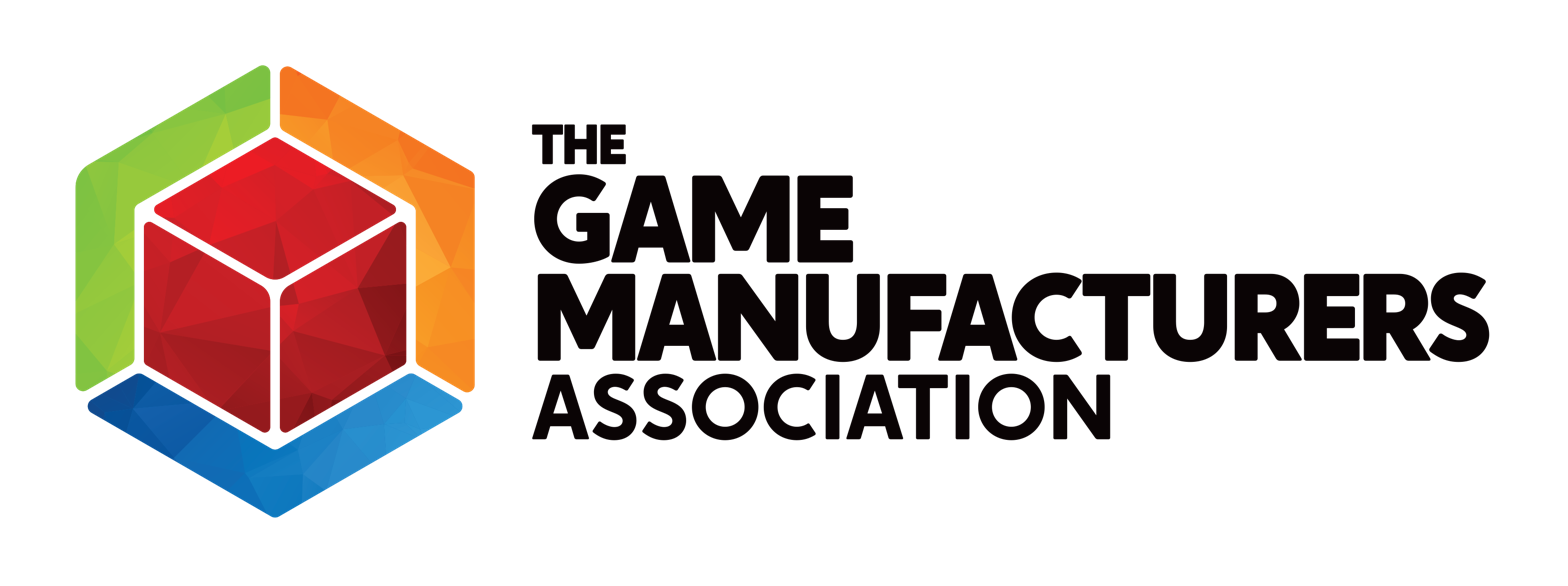
Logo of the Game Manufacturers Association.

The Game Manufacturers Association (GAMA) is a non-profit trade association based in Columbus, Ohio, dedicated to the advancement of the non-electronic social game industry – tabletop games, miniatures games, card games, collectable/tradeable card games, role-playing games, and live-action role playing games. Its members are game manufacturers, retailers, distributors, suppliers, conventions, clubs, and independent professionals related to the games industry.

The association was formed in 1977 to protect the interests of the Origins Game Fair, and was incorporated as a non-profit venture in 1982.

GAMA organizes two shows each year, GAMA EXPO held in different locations, scheduled to be held in Baltimore, MD from 2027-2032 – a professional trade show aimed at game industry professionals, and the Origins Game Fair in Columbus, Ohio – a 15,000+ person consumer show that is aimed at the game-playing public. In 2023, Origins Game Fair hosted 16,082 attendees and featured 330 exhibitors. Origins highest attendance was in 2019, when they had 20,642 attendees. The organization also has a presence at other conventions, partnering with companies to provide gaming events. For example, GAMA partnered with Six Sides of Gaming to provide celebrity Dungeons and Dragons events at Anime Central in 2023.

GAMA has a number of programs designed to advance hobby games as a business. GAMA provides business support programs, educational programs including monthly webinars, and industry advocacy including a Diversity, Equity, and Inclusion (DEI) initiative. The GAMA DEI Committee manages the Horizons Fellowship Program. As described on the organization's website, the program "is an eight-month accelerator for prospective and newly established tabletop game publishers and retail store owners" who are "members of historically underrepresented communities".

Each year the association recognizes excellence in the tabletop game industry with the annual Origins Awards. During the 2023 show, awards were given out in categories including Retail Game of the Year, Best Card Game, Best 2D Game Art, and three board game awards: Social Light Strategy, Strategy, and Thematic.

GAMA also produces several publications. Around the Table "is a quarterly publication organized by the Game Manufacturers Association to foster and support [the tabletop game] industry. Each issue [features] articles by thought leaders across the industry sharing their insights and experiences, previews of upcoming games, as well as practical tips and advice on how to create, promote and sell games." They also produce an annual Winter Wishlist guide for retailers highlighting new and evergreen product suggestions for retailers.
