= Origins Game Fair =

Annual gaming convention

- Genre: Gaming
- Venue: Greater Columbus Convention Center
- Location: Columbus, Ohio
- Country: United States
- Inaugurated: 1975
- Attendance: 20,642 uniques in 2019
- Organizer: Game Manufacturers Association
- Filing status: Non-profit
- Website: http://www.originsgamefair.com/

Origins Game Fair is an annual gaming convention that was first held in 1975. Since 1996, it has been held in Columbus, Ohio at the Greater Columbus Convention Center. Origins is run by the Game Manufacturers Association (GAMA). Origins was chartered to serve gaming in general, including wargaming and miniatures gaming.

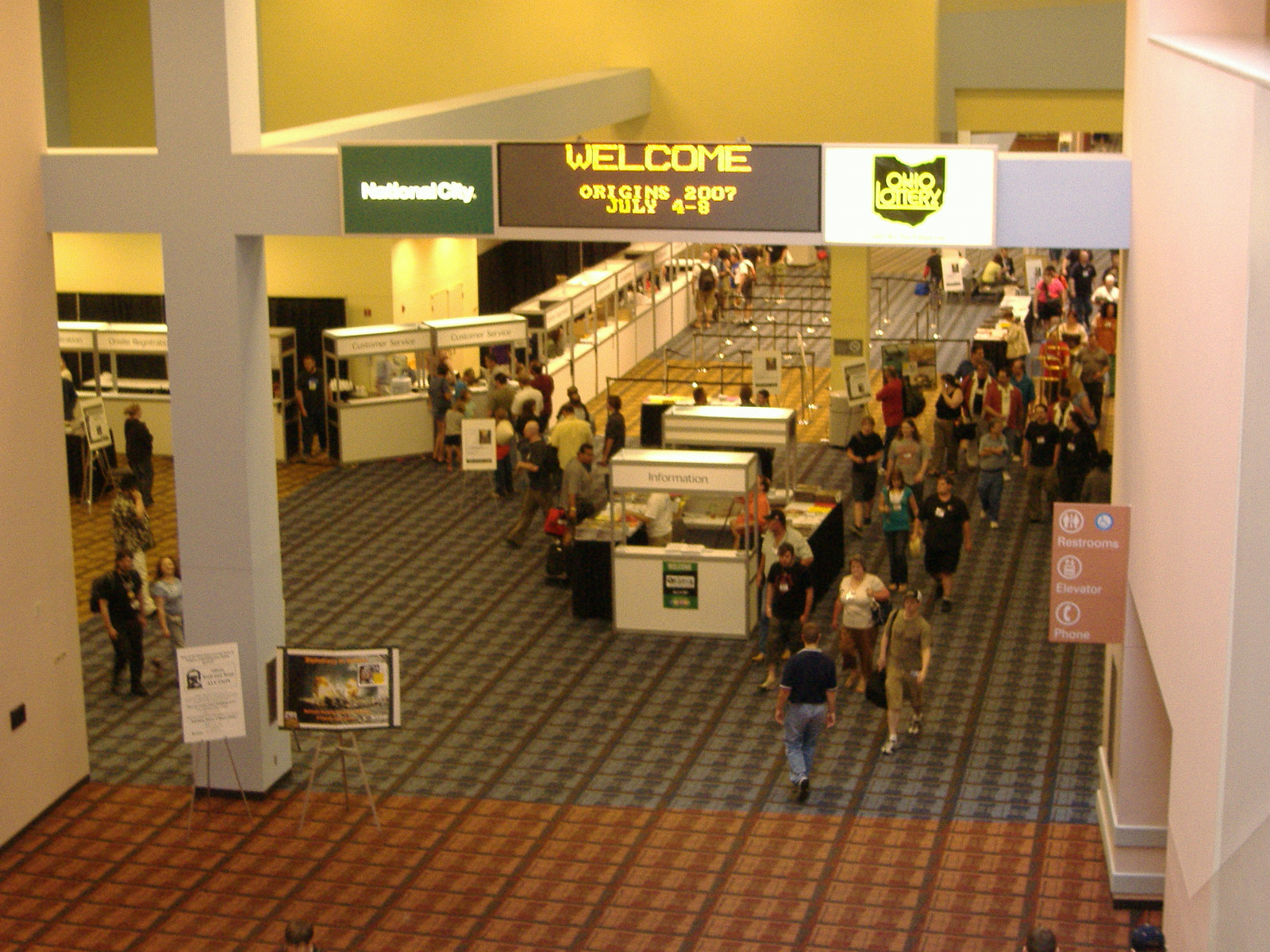
Registration area of Origins

Origins is the site of the annual Origins Awards ceremony. For many years, the Charles S. Roberts Awards for historical boardgames were presented at Origins, but these are now presented at the World Boardgaming Championships. Board games, trading card games, LARPs and role-playing games are also popular at Origins.

Origins Game Fair was formerly known as the Origins International Game Expo. The name was changed in the summer of 2007.

Origins typically has a theme each year, which affects some of the events and decorations like banners or art, and the Origins mascot will be depicted wearing an outfit related to the theme as well. The theme in 2012 was Time Travel. In 2014 it was Monster. 2014 was also the 40th Origins convention and, keeping with the Monster theme, they introduced the mascot Crit. In 2015 the theme was Space. In 2016 it was Robots. 2017 was Dragons. 2018 was Mystery. 2019 was Mythical. A survey was distributed online to help select the theme for the 2020 show. The options were: Scary Fun, Games Around the World, Adventure, Futuristic, and Top Secret. According to the 2019 Origins Sitebook, the theme for 2020 will be Games Around the World.

== History ==
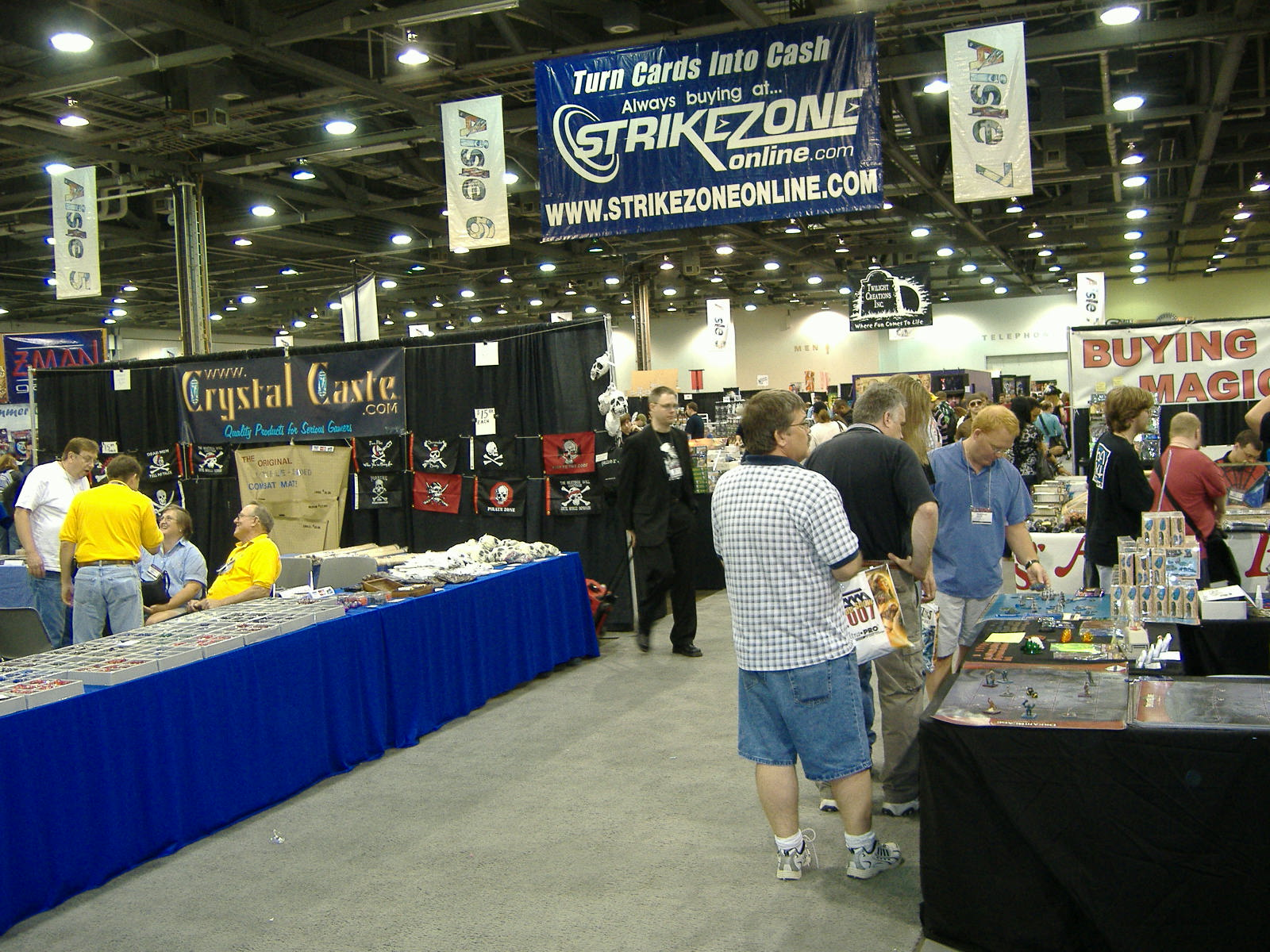
Exhibitor's Hall

Origins started in 1975 with a gathering of game players in Baltimore, Maryland. The Interest Group Baltimore, a local wargaming club, worked with the Baltimore-based Avalon Hill game company to put on the first show that year at Johns Hopkins University.

Avalon Hill produced the first commercial war games in 1958. In a nod to Baltimore's position as the home of Avalon Hill and the birthplace of the commercial wargame hobby, Don Greenwood, a game designer with Avalon Hill and founder of the convention, suggested calling the show "Origins". Over the next few years, both Avalon Hill and SPI (another wargame company) ran the show. As the show continued expanding, the Game Manufacturers Association assumed management in 1978. RuneQuest debuted as Chaosium's first RPG at the Origins convention in Ann Arbor, Michigan in July 1978.

In each of 1988 and 1992, Origins and Gen Con joined together to hold a single convention in Milwaukee.

In April 2020, due to the COVID-19 pandemic, it was announced that Origins would be postponed from its usual mid-June date to October 7–11. In its place, an event called Origins Online was to be held that would allow attendees to "demo and buy games and merchandise" and offer "streaming workshops and educational seminars with guest authors, artists and game designers, plus hundreds of games online that attendees can sign up to participate in."

In June, due to a lack of response by GAMA concerning Black Lives Matter and the George Floyd Protests, some members of the community who were intending to run or participate in Origins Online events stepped down, and others joined them in solidarity. Such a large number of people withdrew, it is speculated that Origins Online may not have been able to run without them. Regardless of the reason, Origins Online was cancelled completely, and GAMA offered to "match, dollar for dollar, any exhibitor, sponsor, advertiser, or vendor who donates the amounts they are owed for Origins Online to one of" several different black organizations. Soon after, the regular Origins convention was cancelled for 2020 as well, citing fears of a second wave of COVID-19. This would mark 2020 as the first year without an Origins convention since 1975.

ICv2 reported that Origins had "17,706 attendees" in June 2024 which was "up over 9% from 2023's attendance total, which was 16,082 people, but still down around 14% from the last pre-pandemic show in 2019, where Origins drew 20,642 people". Additionally in 2024, Origins "had 326 exhibitors, up for 2023's count of 305" and event totals went "from 6,135 to 6,528, up about 6%".

=== Venues ===
Year	Dates	Location
1975	July 25–27	Baltimore, Maryland
1976	July 23–25	Baltimore, Maryland
1977	July 22–24	Staten Island, New York
1978	July 13–16	Ann Arbor, Michigan
1979	June 22–24	Chester, Pennsylvania
1980	June 27–29	Chester, Pennsylvania
1981	July 3–5	San Mateo, California
1982	July 23–25	Baltimore, Maryland
1983	July 14–17	Detroit, Michigan
1984	July 5–8	Dallas, Texas
1985	June 27–30	Towson, Maryland
1986	July 3–6	Los Angeles, California
1987	July 2–5	Baltimore, Maryland
1988	August 18–21	Milwaukee, Wisconsin (with Gen Con)
1989	June 29 - July 2	Los Angeles, California
1990	June 28 - July 1	Atlanta, Georgia (with DragonCon)
1991	July 4–7	Baltimore, Maryland
1992	August 20–23	Milwaukee, Wisconsin (with Gen Con)
1993	July 13–16	Fort Worth, Texas
1994	July 7–10	San Jose, California
1995	July 13–16	Philadelphia, Pennsylvania

=== Columbus, Ohio ===
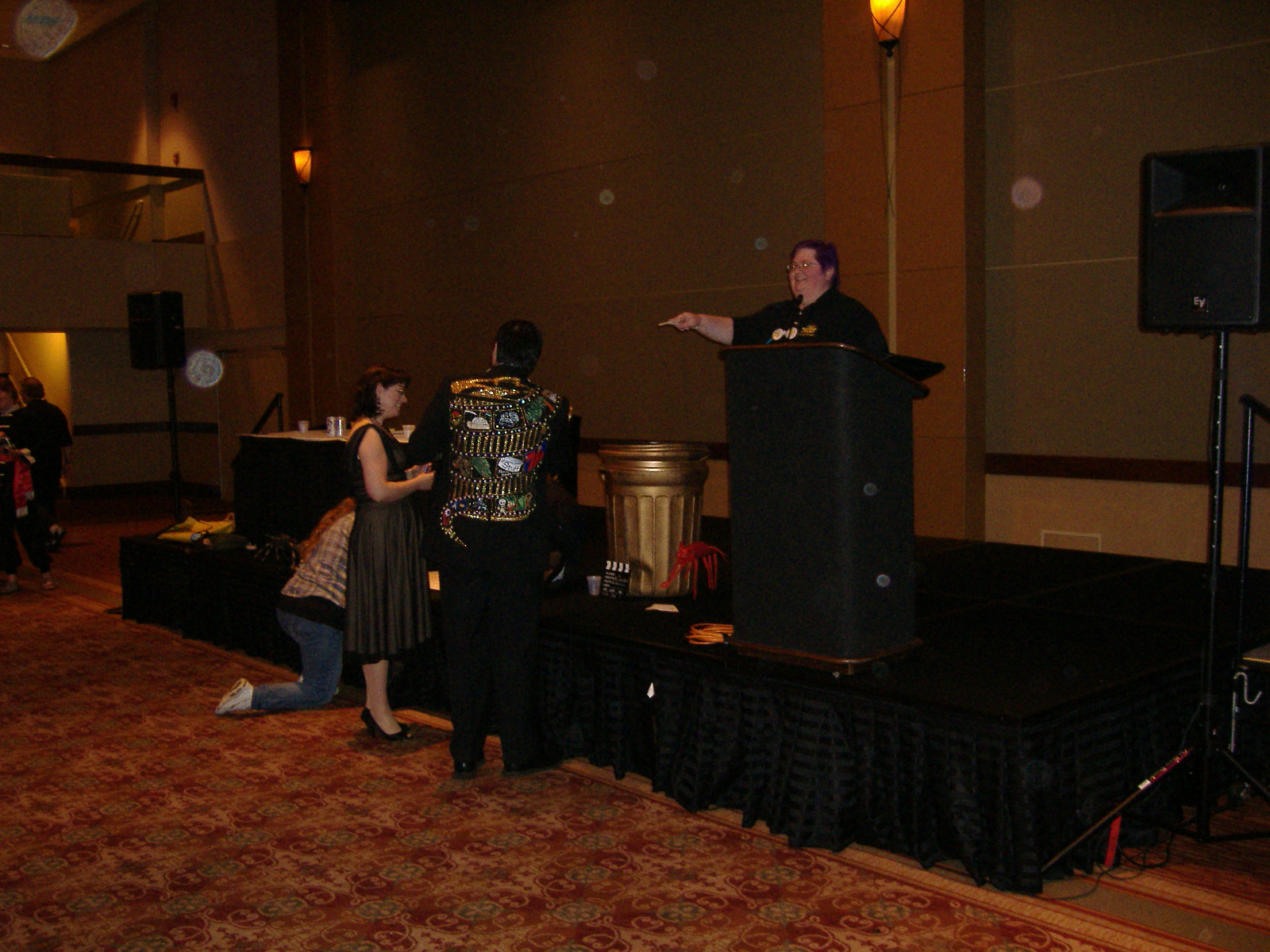
"Alan Smithee" (the man in the gaudy jacket) consulting with his helpers at the 2007 Smithee Awards at the Origins International Game Expo

Throughout the first twenty years of its life, Origins migrated from city to city, until in 1996, GAMA decided to anchor Origins in a single location. After considering a number of possibilities, GAMA chose Columbus, Ohio.

Year	Dates	Attendance (Unique)
1996	July 4–7	
1997	July 17–20	
1998	July 2–5	
1999	July 1–4	
2000	July 13–16	
2001	July 5–8	
2002	July 4–7	10,500 (approximate)
2003	June 26–29	12,600
2004	June 24–27	13,980
2005	June 30 - July 3	15,061
2006	June 29 - July 2	11,852
2007	July 5–8	11,104
2008	June 26–29	10,110
2009	June 25–28	10,030
2010	June 24–27	10,669
2011	June 22–26	11,502
2012	May 30 - June 3	11,332
2013	June 12 - June 16	11,573
2014	June 11 - June 15	12,902
2015	June 3 - June 7	15,938
2016	June 15 - June 19	15,480
2017	June 14 - June 18	17,001
2018	June 13 - June 17	18,648
2019	June 12 - June 16	20,642
2020	Cancelled	
2021	September 30 - October 3	10,476
2022	June 8 - June 12	11,689
2023	June 21 - June 25	16,082
2024	June 19 - June 23	17,706
2025	June 18 - June 22	19,171
2026	June 17 - June 21 (planned)	

== Controversies ==
Several reports of sexual harassment emerged after 2018 Origins Game Fair in Columbus, Ohio. After multiple first hand accounts were published on social media and Reddit, GAMA, released a public statement regarding the complaints and has since then updated its anti-harassment policies.

== See also ==
- Festival International des Jeux
- Gen Con
- Hellana Games - Festival of Games and History
- Lucca Comics & Games
- Spiel
- UK GamesExpo
