= Redmond A. Simonsen =

American board game designer (1942–2005)

- Simonsen posthumously honored as the King of Clubs in Flying Buffalo's Famous Game Designer Trading Cards, 2008
- Born: Redmond Aksel Simonsen; June 18, 1942; Inwood, Manhattan, U.S.
- Died: March 9, 2005 (aged 62); Garland, Texas, U.S.
- Resting place: Saint Johns Union Cemetery (Mount Pleasant, Pennsylvania)
- Writing career
- Genre: Wargames

Redmond Aksel Simonsen (June 18, 1942 – March 9, 2005) was an American graphic artist and game designer best known for his work at the board wargame company Simulations Publications, Inc. (SPI) in the 1970s and early 1980s. Simonsen was considered an innovator in game information graphics, and is credited with creating the term "game designer".

As art director at SPI Simonsen supervised the release of over 400 game titles, and had game design or development credit for over twenty games. In addition, he variously held positions of executive art editor and co-editor or executive editor for the SPI magazines Strategy & Tactics, MOVES and Ares. Simonsen was the Charles Roberts Awards Hall of Fame inductee for 1977. He was honored as a "famous game designer" by being featured as the king of clubs in Flying Buffalo's 2008 Famous Game Designers Playing Card Deck.

== Early life ==
Simonsen was born and raised in Inwood, Manhattan, the second son of Astri Nordlie Simonsen and August Emil Simonsen, an immigrant from Norway. His father was a high ironworker who died in a fall from a building; his mother then worked as a domestic and raised her three children August, Lois, and Redmond. Simonsen attended the Stuyvesant High School from 1956-1960. He served two tours in the United States Air Force, and was accepted for enrollment at Cooper Union, where he received a Bachelor of Fine Arts degree in 1964. Subsequent work as a graphic artist included designing the book jacket for Is Paris Burning? (1965), album covers for London Records, and KOOL cigarette advertisements. He also worked as a photographer, and sold pictures to TIME, Newsweek and The New York Times.

== Strategy & Tactics and SPI ==
Main articles: Strategy & Tactics and Simulation Publications, Inc.

Redmond Simonsen was the graphic designer on the wargaming hobby fanzine Strategy & Tactics. In 1969, the 'zine was sold by its founder/publisher Chris Wagner to James F. Dunnigan for $1. Although circulation was only around 1,000 copies, Dunnigan planned on using the magazine to promote new games he was designing. Later he wrote in The Complete Wargames Handbook:

Doing the magazine also brought graphic design ace Redmond Simonsen into SPI. I knew that the magazine, and the games, needed a professional look. Simonsen was a native New Yorker, and a wargamer in addition to being a highly talented artist. So I made him an offer he couldn't refuse: half the business (we later shared some of this with some of the original staff).

The format of Strategy & Tactics (S&T) was ambitiously changed to a bi-monthly magazine with a complete game inside every issue, along with an accompanying historical article. Dunigan created Simulations Publications, Inc. (SPI) in 1969, with Simonsen as his co-founder. Dunnigan and Simonsen's newly incorporated SPI began publish non-magazine games as well. At that time the main wargame publisher, Avalon Hill, released only one or two new games a year. The response was overwhelming. Simonsen wrote: "Via a program of advertising, S&Ts circulation began to build and sales of SPI games to its readers began to take on serious proportions." Combined with other factors such as a sophisticated computerized customer feedback system the company experienced exponential growth. By the mid-'70s SPI's revenues exceeded $2 million annually, with up to forty employees. Circulation of Strategy and Tactics steadily grew, eventually peaking at over 36,000 by 1980.

Simonsen acted as founding editor for SPI's Ares Magazine, a fantasy/science fiction game magazine following the same approach as Strategy & Tactics, until replaced during the TSR takeover.

Simonsen also wrote fictional backgrounds for various SPI games, notably for StarForce and Battlefleet Mars, often with humorous elements hidden in the text.

== Physical systems design ==
It was at SPI that Simonsen coined the term "physical systems design" to describe the application of graphic design concepts to board games. He defined it as follows:

I should perhaps explain what I mean by the term "physical system". The term is really my personal jargon for the graphic engineering of game elements. The more graphic engineering the artist can build into the game equipment and rules, the easier and more enjoyable becomes the play of the game.

In 1969 however, Simonsen's ability to implement such graphic engineering was limited by SPI's starting capital, which was only "a hundred dollars" borrowed from writer Al Nofi. Accordingly, production standards for their first series of games were comparatively low. While competitor Avalon Hill was owned by the printers Monarch Press, and thus was able to use professional production equipment, SPI was essentially producing game "kits". Designer Greg Costikyan wrote:

SPI's first games had been published with black-and-white maps, printed on paper. The counters for its games were printed on colored paper; buyers had to glue the paper to shirt cardboard, then cut the counters apart with an X-acto knife. Rules were printed on "bedsheets," large sheets of paper folded down to normal letter size, saving the cost of cutting, collating, and binding. And there had been neither box nor counter tray.

Increased revenue and experience led to progressive improvements in production quality, and Simonsen continuously refined the standards for game components. The playing boards ("maps") went from black-and-white to two-color and then full-color. Playing pieces ("counters") became professionally mounted and die-cut, eventually being printed on both sides in full-color. Simonsen now had the means to implement his physical system design concepts. Game designer John Prados recalled that "Redmond prided himself on making at least one graphical innovation each game."

The role of "game developer" was unknown in the games industry at the time. Simonsen invented the role as "A professional who was responsible for turning the designer's prototype into a 'camera-ready' product. Thus, he was responsible for managing playtests, editing and writing rules and play aids, preparing sketches and other graphical elements, and ensuring that the 'house style' was preserved across several games."

== After SPI ==
Marketing lapses as well as financial mismanagement led to declining real income for SPI, culminating in Dunnigan's ouster as company manager (replaced by original S&T founder Chris Wagner). However, with the economy in the midst of a recession, SPI was not able to make a recovery. In 1982 the company's assets were sold to TSR, Inc. Simonsen was fired from TSR on April 30, 1982.

Along with former SPI designer Brad Hessel, he founded Ares Development Corporation to produce video games. Simonsen had already successfully "ported" the board game The Wreck of the B.S.M. Pandora to the Apple II, creating one of the first real-time strategy games. A multi-game contract with Texas Instruments fell through when they pulled out of the home computer market in 1984.

Simonsen then moved to Richardson, Texas where, with Jerry Robinson, he co-founded Microbotics, manufacturers of peripherals for the Amiga platform of home computers. Around 1992 Microbotics closed and he retired from active work, becoming a gaming network moderator for BIX and other places. In 1993 Simonsen contributed to Master of Orion: The Official Strategy Guide (Prima Publishing, 1993), devising a naming-convention for ships. By 1998 he had retired completely and spent his time drawing, writing computer programs and science fiction short stories.

Simonsen suffered a heart attack in 2004 and two more in early 2005 which led to his hospitalization and death in Garland, Texas, on March 9, 2005, at the age of 62.

== Awards and honors ==
Three years after his death, Flying Buffalo featured Simonsen as the King of Clubs in the 2008 iteration of their Famous Game Designer Trading Cards.
