= Dauntless =

Dauntless may refer to:

== Military ==
- Douglas SBD Dauntless, a World War II American naval scout plane and dive bomber
- Operation Dauntess, a military operation part of Operation Courageous
- Operation Martlet (a.k.a. Operation Dauntless), part of a series of British attacks to capture the town of Caen and its environs from German forces

== Vessels ==
- Dauntless (steamboat), a 93-foot-long (28 m) steamer in the Puget Sound mosquito fleet
- HMS Dauntless, five ships and one shore establishment of the Royal Navy
- USCGC Dauntless (WMEC-624), a United States Coast Guard cutter
- USS Dauntless, three ships of the United States Navy
- Dauntless wooden yacht schooner built in 1866

=== Fictional ===
- Dauntless, a fictional sailboat in children's books by James Lennox Kerr
- Dauntless, a fictional starship in The Lost Fleet: Dauntless by John G. Hemry
- HMS Dauntless, a fictional ship-of-the-line from the 2003 American fantasy swashbuckler film Pirates of the Caribbean: The Curse of the Black Pearl
- USS Dauntless (NX-01-A), a fictional starship from the fourth season Star Trek: Voyager episode "Hope and Fear"

== Other ==
- Dauntless (board game), a board wargame simulating aerial combat in World War II
- Dauntless (video game), a free-to-play action role-playing video game
- Dauntless: The Battle of Midway, a 2019 American film, directed by Mike Phillips
- Dauntless, one of the five factions in the Divergent novel and film series
- Archibald Dauntless, a fictional hobo portrayed by Lily Tomlin in The Magic School Bus special A Magic School Bus Halloween
- A premium, American-made, wood-fired evaporator manufactured by Smoky Lake Maple Products.
- Callsign of Lynx Air, a Canadian low-cost carrier.
