= Dauntless (board game) =

WWII air combat board wargame

First edition Battleline box cover, 1977

Dauntless, subtitled "Plane to Plane Combat in the Pacific — 1942–1945", is a board wargame published by Battleline Publications in 1977 that simulates aerial combat in the Asiatic-Pacific Theater during World War II.

== Description ==
Dauntless is a tactical wargame for two or more players. One player or one team controls Allied aircraft, and the other player or team controls Japanese aircraft.

=== Components and gameplay ===
The board consists of six geomorphic mapsheets. Aircraft and ships are represented by 375 die-cut counters. The game uses a simultaneous movement system in which players log planned maneuvers and then simultaneously reveal them. The players use airplane data cards that list aircraft performance based on altitude.

The rules are divided into a Basic Game and Advanced Game. The Advanced Game adds rules for spotting, non-plotted movement, bombing and rocket fire, training and experience, blind spots, and bailing out.

The sequence of events in each turn is:

1. First Movement Plotting Phase and Execution Phase
2. Second Movement Plotting Phase and Execution Phase
3. Third Movement Plotting Phase and Execution Phase
4. Adjustments and Changes Plotting Phase

Each plane may attempt to fire at the end of every Movement Phase.

== Publication history ==
Battleline was a subsidiary of Heritage Models that produced various games in the 1970s. In 1976, Battleline game designer S. Craig Taylor created Air Force, an air combat game set in the European Theater of World War II. The following year, Taylor designed Dauntless, a stand-alone air combat game using the same rules as Air Force but set in the Pacific Theater.

Avalon Hill's revised edition with artwork by Joe deMarco

Avalon Hill often bought Battleline games such as Circus Maximus and Wooden Ships and Iron Men and republished them under the Avalon Hill marque. They did the same with Air Force and Dauntless, republishing them in 1977.

When Battleline released the Air Force Dauntless Expansion Kit in 1978, Avalon Hill immediately bought it and republished it.

Three years later, Kevin Zucker revised Air Force and Dauntless for Avalon Hill, making Air Force the primary game; Dauntless became an expansion, and players now needed a copy of Air Force in order to play Dauntless. Part of Zucker's revision was to replace the numerical data on the airplane cards with colored diagrams. It was a controversial change, although some reviewers noted there were both advantages and disadvantages to the new cards. The new edition featured cover art by Joe DeMarco.

An expansion titled Sturmovik that would add airplanes from the Russian Front was promised but was never published.

== Reception ==
In Issue 38 of Moves, David Bieksza and Karl Wiegers agreed that "the outcome of any particular matchup in a dogfight is always very much in question, as it takes a skilled player to properly exploit the strengths of his own aircraft and the weakness of his opponent." They concluded, "The diversity of scenarios, both solitaire and competition, and the virtually limitless possible combination of fighters in dogfights ensures that it will provide many hours of enjoyment, as well as a deeper understanding of tactics in the air in World War II."

In Issue 18 of the British wargaming magazine Perfidious Albion, Lawrence Marrotti thought that "The rules are well done ... All in all, an excellent game well worth the 12 dollar investment."

In Issue 12 of the British wargaming magazine Phoenix, Rob Gibson called the game "easy to play and, what is more, fun to play." Gibson's only complaint was that only one of the many scenarios provided was based on an actual historical occurrence. Despite this, Gibson concluded, "Having played World War Two air combat with miniatures and spent hours clambering wearily over the numerous tables to determine a microscopic non-vital hit, I strongly recommend [Dauntless] to any air war fanatic."

In 1990, 13 years after the game's publication, Friedrich Helfferich and Joseph Miranda wrote positively about Dauntless, but pointed out that the personal computer had made these types of games obsolete: "Dauntless lets you fly a plane in combat almost like on a flight simulator. And herein lies its only weakness. The game is dated in that it was designed before the arrival of the home computer. To go through all the necessary plotting, moving, checking, die-rolling, cross-indexing, bookkeeping, etc., and be sure not to forget any modifier or prohibitions takes quite a bit of time, and today that puts Dauntless at a disadvantage compared with computer games that can do the same thing much faster."

In a retrospective review in Issue 7 of Simulacrum in 2000, Joseph Scoleri noted, "the Air Force/Dauntless system remained the undisputed king of WWII air combat board gaming for over a decade. Dauntless still fills a unique niche today. It remains the most comprehensive tactical treatment of Pacific Theater air warfare found in a boardgame."

== Other reviews ==
- Fire & Movement #72
