= 5th Fleet (video game) =

1994 wargame video game

- Developer: Stanley Associates
- Publisher: Avalon Hill
- Platform: MS-DOS
- Release: 1994
- Genre: Computer wargame
- Modes: Single-player, multiplayer

5th Fleet is a 1994 computer wargame developed by Stanley Associates and published by Avalon Hill.

== Gameplay ==
5th Fleet is a computer wargame that simulates modern naval warfare in the Indian Ocean.

== Development ==
5th Fleet was developed by Stanley Associates and published by Avalon Hill. It is an adaptation of Avalon's board wargame 5th Fleet by Victory Games. The team was led by Stanley Associates' Mike Innella, with assistance from the board version's designer, Joe Balkoski. 5th Fleet was an early piece of Avalon Hill's wider effort to rebuild its computer game branch, a project begun in late 1992. The publisher hired Jim Rose to lead the plan. Overseeing 5th Fleet, Rose noted that he asked Balkoski to "tell us where you cut corners ... for playability" in the board version, and Stanley Associates would include "everything he [had] wanted to put in".

== Reception ==
Reception

Review scores
Publication	Score
Computer Gaming World	4/5
PC Gamer (US)	85%

5th Fleet sold fewer than 50,000 units globally. This was part of a trend for Avalon Hill games during the period; Terry Coleman of Computer Gaming World wrote in late 1998 that "no AH game in the past five years" had reached the mark.

In PC Gamer US, William R. Trotter called 5th Fleet "an elegant conversion of a board-gaming classic; a must-have for fans of naval war who relish action above all other elements." Tim Carter of Computer Gaming World was similarly positive, dubbing it "great fun".

== Legacy ==
Stanley Associates went on to adapt the Avalon Hill board wargame Wooden Ships and Iron Men into a computer format, resulting in the game Wooden Ships and Iron Men (1996).
