= Air Force (game) =

1976 board wargame

Box cover of original Battleline edition, 1976

Air Force is a board wargame published by Battleline Publications in 1976, and subsequently re-released by Avalon Hill in 1977, that simulates air combat during World War II. Several expansions for the game were also published.

== Description ==
Air Force is a complex multi-player wargame that allows players to simulate air combat over Europe during World War II. Thirty airplanes from the Luftwaffe, RAF and USAAF are included. Each airplane has a corresponding card with numerical data that tracks maneuverability, speed, armaments, ammunition, damage, altitude and attitude.

=== Components ===
The game box of the 1976 Battleline edition contains:

- plain hex grid mapsheet
- 270 die-cut counters
- rulebook
- cards with numerical data for each airplane
- player aid chart

The 1977 Avalon Hill edition has all the same components. The 2nd edition published by Avalon Hill in 1980 replaces the numerical data on the airplane cards with colored diagrams.

=== Gameplay ===
Each player controls one or more airplanes and uses the data on the corresponding airplane card to plot out each airplane's maneuvers. The sequence of events in each turn is:

1. First Movement Plotting Phase and Execution Phase
2. Second Movement Plotting Phase and Execution Phase
3. Third Movement Plotting Phase and Execution Phase
4. Adjustments and Changes Plotting Phase

Each plane may attempt to fire at the end of every Movement Phase.

== Publication history ==
Battleline was a subsidiary of Heritage Models that produced various games in the 1970s. Battleline game designer S. Craig Taylor designed Air Force, which was published in 1976. The following year, Battleline published a game expansion, Dauntless, that added thirty Japanese and American airplanes from the Pacific Theatre as well as a six-piece geomorphic map. In 1978 Battleline published a further expansion titled Air Force Dauntless Expansion Kit.

Avalon Hill often bought Battleline games such as Circus Maximus and Wooden Ships and Iron Men and republished them under the Avalon Hill marque. They did the same with Air Force and Dauntless, republishing them in 1977. When Battleline published Dauntless Expansion Kit, Avalon Hill immediately bought it and republished it in 1978.

Three years later, Kevin Zucker revised the game for Avalon Hill, replacing the numerical data on the airplane cards with colored diagrams. It was a controversial change, although some reviewers noted there were both advantages and disadvantages to the new cards. An expansion titled Sturmovik that would add airplanes from the Russian Front was promised but was never published.

Foreign language versions of Air Force were published by both Hobby Japan (Japanese) and Wargames Research Centre (Chinese).

== Reception ==
In Issue 13 of Perfidious Albion, Dave Merriman commented, "The main joy of the game is the mass attacks, when you have almost squadron combats with each side using 8 fighters or 18 bombers. These tend to be rather long in playing, since half the time will be writing orders." Merriman also noted "The combat system seems to be too much of a hit and miss thing." Despite this Merriman concluded, "The types of combats in this game are almost endless, all in all a very good game and should be purchased by the air buff, but it is not a beginners game." Four issues later, David Horton found the game "beautifully organised and managed. Information flows readily to your need." Horton thought that "the game has much more aerial flavour than Foxbat & Phantom. However, Horton admitted that "it is extremely frustrating learning to play the game."

In Issue 54 of the UK magazine Games & Puzzles (November 1976), Nick Palmer noted that "Air Force is by a small American company whose products have attracted increasing attention for their consistently high quality." Palmer thought that "Simultaneous movement and a complex but realistic-looking system for determining speed and permissible manoeuvres result in an enthralling struggle for the best attack positions." He concluded by giving the game an Excitement grade of 3 out of 5, saying, "Air Force is definitely not for beginners, but it should delight more experienced players keen to see an air game which goes into every kind of detail from half-loops and visibility to glide bombing and the problems of take-off." In his 1977 book The Comprehensive Guide to Board Wargaming, Palmer noted "Map rather bland, since some scenarios involve disregarding terrain" but concluded, "Good tactical stuff."

In Issue 27 of Phoenix, K.A. Smith noted that even with rules changes made to the second edition, the game still had one flaw: "It is a guessing game. Even the best players will admit that while your planes fly and act like Spitfires or 109s, to shoot your opponent down you don't out-manoeuvre him you have to out-guess him."

In The Wargamer (Vol.1 #18), Jim Hind reviewed the second edition and noted the advantage of the new color graphical airplane cards, remembering that with the old cards "it was a simple matter to misread the data sheets [...] Avalon Hill [with the new graphical cards] make it more difficult to commit this particular error." However, Hind pointed out the new cards had less room for data "so [Avalon Hill] adjusted the [airplane] performance to fit the chart. I take it we're all in agreement that in those circumstances, they should have instead adjusted the chart to fit the performance?" Hind also questioned why Avalon Hill had not added any new historical scenarios to the second edition.

In the same issue of Wargamer, Norman Albrecht, who had been a playtester for the second edition, called the graphical airplane cards of the second edition "ugly, cluttered and difficult to read." He also thought game designer Kevin Zucker "deviated greatly from the spirit of Air Force and didn't heed the suggestions [of playtesters] to get back on track."

In The Guide to Simulations/Games for Education and Training, Martin Campion warned "The game system is intricate and hard to learn, but it plays very easily once the players get started."

== Other reviews ==
- Phoenix #12
- Fire & Movement #3
- Fire & Movement #72
- Moves #38, p4-9
- Perfidious Albion #18 (June 1977) p. 5
- Panzerfaust and Campaign #75
