= Quadriga (disambiguation) =

Quadriga is a Latin word for a chariot drawn by four horses.

It may also refer to:

- the Triumphal Quadriga, also known as the Horses of Saint Mark
- the sculptural depiction of a four-horse chariot atop the Brandenburg Gate
- Quadriga (award), the statuette for which is modeled after the Brandenburg quadriga
- Quadriga Consort, an early music ensemble based in Austria
- Quadriga Productions, a film production company
- European quadriga, the quadrinomial committee led by the European Commission (Eurogroup) with the European Central Bank, the International Monetary Fund and the European Stability Mechanism that organised loans to the governments of Greece
- Quadriga, a method of interpretation of the Bible that developed in the early church and survived up to medieval times. It stated that a text had four layers of meaning: the literal, the moral, the allegorical and the anagogical. See Allegorical interpretation of the Bible.
- Quadriga Fintech Solutions, a former Canadian cryptocurrency exchange
- Qvadriga, a 2014 chariot racing video game
