= Frigate (disambiguation) =

Frigate or variant, may refer to:

- Frigate, a type of warship
  - Steam frigate
- Frigate captain (aka "Frigate" or "Captain") naval officer rank usually equivalent to "OF-4"
- Frigatebird (aka "frigate"; familia Fregatidae) seabirds
- Frigate (album), 1994 rock album by April Wine
- Frigate: Sea War in the Age of Sail, a 1974 board wargame about naval combat during the Age of Sail

== See also ==
- Frigate Island
- List of frigates (warships)
- List of frigate classes (warship classes)
- Frigate Bird (disambiguation)
