= Alpha Omega (board game) =

Science fiction board game published in 1977

- Battleline (1st edition), 1977
- Designers: Sean Hayes, J. Stephen Peek
- Publishers: Battleline Publications; Avalon Hill
- Publication: 1977; 48 years ago
- Genres: Board wargame
- Players: 1-3

Alpha Omega is a science fiction board wargame published by Battleline Publications in 1977 that simulates combat between alien and human space fleets. Avalon Hill acquired the game and republished it in 1980.

== Description ==
=== Setting ===
In the distant future, the human race has created a small empire of a dozen star systems and is thriving. Then a hyperspatial tunnel opens and the Droves, a race of hive mind androids, emerge to attack. The Droves also attack a nearby alien race, the Rylsh, and humans and Rylsh form an alliance against the Droves. Their only hope of survival is to destroy the Droves' hyperspatial tunnel.

=== Gameplay ===
Alpha Omega is a tactical science fiction game for 1-3 players in which each player takes control of one of the space fleets: the humans, the Rylsh, or the Droves. The hex grid map, featuring oversized 1.25 in (3.2 cm) hexes, is scaled at 186,000 mi (299,000 km) or one light-second per hex. Turns represent 6 seconds of game time. The human weapons are conventional science fiction weapons. The alien weapons are very different, and have some special effects. The game includes a number of scenarios that follow the storyline of the war.

Each ship produces energy that must be allocated each turn to various tasks: movement, scanning and cloaking devices, shields, beams, and special weapons. Ships can allocate energy to their normal drives to move up to five hexes per turn at below the speed of light. or can use their FTL (Faster Than Light) drive to travel at either 6, 12 or 18 hexes per turn. However, the FTL drive uses all available energy, so combat is not possible during FTL travel.

At the start of each turn, following energy allocation, each player plots a course for each ship in their fleet for the turn. These movement plots are revealed simultaneously.

== Publication history ==
Alpha Omega was created by Sean Hayes and J. Stephen Peek and published by Battleline Publications as the company's first science fiction game. The counters featured photographs of metal spaceship miniatures produced by Valiant Enterprises , Although Battleline made no overt link to Valiant's products, critics noted that the oversized hexes on the map board seemed an ideal size for Valiant's metal ships.

In 1980, Avalon Hill acquired the rights to the game, and republished it with the same box cover and few changes to the rules. In 1982, Avalon Hill published a second edition with new cover art by Mark Wheatley.

== Reception ==
In The Space Gamer No. 14, Norman S. Howe commented that Alpha Omega was "one of the strangest realistic simulations I have ever seen. The game system resembles Lou Zocchi's Alien Space in some respects." Howe was disappointed that, for the relatively high price of the game, the space combat was not three-dimensional, and the game did not come with any dice, although dice rolling is a central aspect of the game. Howe concluded, "Alpha Omega fills an important gap in sf wargaming: the multiple-scenario tactical space battle."

In Issue 24 of the British wargaming magazine Perfidious Albion, Charles Vasey and Geoffrey Barnard discussed the game. Barnard called it, " A very good game that I greatly enjoyed playing. There do seem to be some loose ends in the rules ... Play flows superbly well, and the plot sheets are a real pleasure to use." Vasey replied by stating that this was simply a game of aerial combat like Air Force. Vasey did note that "when one has several choices — speed, firepower, tracking and cloaking — then things become rather more skillful and you must be aware of the options before picking your tactics." Barnard concluded, "A game that can be heartily recommended to any fan of tactical space games, or any naval/air enthusiast wanting a change." Vasey concluded, "A workmanlike game but not one that fills me with a great excitement."

In the August 1978 edition of Dragon, Dave Minch was not impressed by the game, calling it "little more than a naval game set on a starfield map. The rules for movement, facing and combat are more than a little reminiscent of [Battleline's previously published wargame] Submarine, a fine game but a poor parent for this one." He was not pleased with the artwork on the counters, saying, "On the whole, the counters are less successful than the fine counters in other Battleline games. Part of this is because the ship counters are photographic reproductions of Valiant miniatures, muddily done." Minch also thought the game "lacked believability, an important quantity in a science fiction game. The weapons, from the Argonne Accumulator to the Dacer Shield, are just names. They are not only unexplained and unjustified, they are difficult to accept." Minch did find some good touches to the game, "but not enough to save it." Minch concluded, "To anyone with a background in SF gaming, Alpha Omega is a second choice; at best. For gamers just making the jump from conventional wargames, it's not bad; it just isn't very good."

In the 1980 book The Complete Book of Wargames, game designer Jon Freeman was disappointed by the game, saying, "the game wasn't adequately developed." He found that in all scenarios, "the side with the larger ships is favored." Freeman also found issues and loopholes with the energy allocation system, noting "all ships suffer from a poverty of energy: they can't utilize half their options." Freeman gave this game an Overall Evaluation of "Good", concluding, "If you can find or construct a scenario with relatively equivalent forces, it will provide an entertaining challenge."

== Reviews ==
- Galileo
