= Naval War =

Card-based naval combat game

Naval War is a card game first published by Battleline Publications in 1979.

== Description ==
Naval War is a light system of naval combat, not intended to represent any actual tactics of historical naval battles, in which players may operate ships from opposing navies side-by-side. All ships depicted in the game were involved in World War II. The basic mechanic is one where ships have different size guns and players have cards which are different size ammunition. A player must match ammo to the guns to fire and damage other players' ships. Players have multiple ships and the winner is the last player with ships afloat; in the latest edition (1983), winning is based on points from sinking enemy ships.

== Publication history ==
Naval War was first published by Battleline Publications in 1979, and was designed by S. Craig Taylor, Jr. and Neil Zimmerer.

== Reception ==
Naval War was chosen for inclusion in the 2007 book Hobby Games: The 100 Best. Writer John Scott Tynes explained why the game had been included: "There hasn't been an edition of Naval War since Avalon Hill's in 1983 and the game is long out of print. Yet the World Boardgaming Championships have crowned a Naval War champion every single year since 1992, a testament to the vitality and irresistible appeal of this superb game."
