= Objective: Atlanta =

1977 American Civil War board wargame

Objective: Atlanta, subtitled "A Game of the Civil War Campaign for Atlanta", is a board wargame published by Battleline Publications in 1977 that simulates the Atlanta campaign during the American Civil War.

== Background ==
In May 1864, Union General William Tecumseh Sherman initiated an invasion of Georgia with the twin goals of capturing Atlanta and destroying the Confederate Army of Tennessee. Sherman drove the Confederate army of General Joseph E. Johnston back through a series of flanking maneuvers and then overcame a series of counterattacks by General John B. Hood.

== Description ==
Objective: Atlanta is a two-player board wargame in which one player controls Union forces, and the other player controls Confederate forces. The game uses 400 counters to represent various units and pieces of equipment, and emphasizes logistics over tactics — as critic Jon Freeman noted, "This game places a heavy emphasis on the logistical end of the campaigning — supply lines, ammo, and all that."

Movement is an important part of the game, and in addition to a large Movement Chart, there are route rules, as well as rules for the construction of bridges and entrenchments, and for the Confederate player, rules on the use of slave labor.

=== Gameplay ===
Objective: Atlanta uses an alternating "I Go, You Go" system, where one player moves and attacks, followed by the other player. Each pair of turns represents one day. The combat system is resolved via attrition rather than elimination. The game provides five scenarios, which can be combined into a long campaign of 109 turns.

== Publication history ==
Objective: Atlanta was designed by freelance game designer Patrick Price, and extensively redesigned and developed by Steve Peek, Jack Greene, and S. Craig Taylor only weeks before the game was to be sold at Origins '77. In the rush to get the game printed in time, the designer's notes and historical notes were left out. According to Jack Greene, the game was not sufficiently playtested before it was published.

== Reception ==
In Issue 29 of the British wargaming magazine Perfidious Albion, Peter Bartlam and Geoff Williams discussed this game. Bartlam commented, "Inside Objective Atlanta there is a good game trying to get out ... There are three main shortcomings: Supply, Artillery and Morale." Williams replied, "Combat seems okay although it is rather bloodless. ... I felt that leaders were too powerful in their ability to stop rout." Both concluded by giving the game a rating of 8 out of 10 for Effort but only 4 out of 10 for quality of play, agreeing that "It's pretty dull to play ... could have been a very good game and it might repay a little tinkering with the rules."

In the 1980 book The Complete Book of Wargames, Jon Freeman thought that in historical terms, this game was "impressive". However, Freeman felt that Operation: Atlanta "is too much of a simulation to be a good game, and the subject is too esoteric to hold the interests of the 'historians'." Freeman pointed out that "The Southern player is always on a depressingly worsening defensive, and that's too much of a drag to carry on for more than a hundred turns." Freeman also thought because of the emphasis on logistics, "units move exceptionally slowly, so the game has little maneuver or fluidity." He gave this game an Overall Evaluation of "Fair to Good", concluding, "If your main interests are organizational and logistical problems, or you just plain like the Civil War, you might just try it."

In Issue 38 of Moves, John Prados gave a thorough analysis of the game, and although he found much to like, he did note some problems. Prados felt that the game's attritional system led to an over-weakening of the Confederate side that was not historically accurate and also saw loopholes in the rules which could lead to ahistorical uses of cavalry units. He found the rules not well organized, and specific rules were hard to find when needed. Prados didn't like the map, pointing out that non-useful terrain such as forest, which had no effect on the game, effectively obscured terrains such as slopes, which did have an effect on movement and combat. Prados concluded on an ambivalent note, saying, "Atlanta is a solid game using a system that engages the attention of players and has the potential for dynamic change in the situation. [...] One would hope, however, that future Civil war games in this line will iron out such system weaknesses as still remain."

== Other reviews and commentary ==
- Campaign #83
