= Wooden Ships and Iron Men (1996 video game) =

- Developer(s): Stanley Associates
- Publisher(s): Avalon Hill
- Platform(s): DOS
- Release: 1996
- Genre(s): Computer wargame
- Mode(s): Single-player, multiplayer

Wooden Ships and Iron Men is a 1996 computer wargame developed by Stanley Associates and published by Avalon Hill. It is an adaptation of the board wargame Wooden Ships and Iron Men.

== Gameplay ==
Wooden Ships and Iron Men is a computer wargame that simulates historical naval warfare, around the time of the Napoleonic Wars.

== Development ==
Wooden Ships and Iron Men was developed by Stanley Associates and published by Avalon Hill, as an adaptation of the publisher's board wargame Wooden Ships and Iron Men. The two companies had previously worked together on 5th Fleet. Stanley's Mike Inella said that the team wanted to make "a PC treatment [of Wooden Ships] that completely eliminated any feeling of counting hexes". One change to the design was an increase in the number of wind directions from four to eight. The game was under production for more than two years.

== Reception ==
Reception

Review score
Publication	Score
CNET Gamecenter	8/10

Wooden Ships and Iron Men sold fewer than 50,000 units globally. This was part of a trend for Avalon Hill games during the period; Terry Coleman of Computer Gaming World wrote in late 1998 that "no AH game in the past five years" had reached the mark.

Wooden Ships and Iron Men was a finalist for Computer Gaming World's 1996 "Wargame of the Year" award, which ultimately went to Battleground 4: Shiloh. The magazine's wargame columnist Terry Coleman gave it his 1996 "Most Pleasant Surprise" award, and dubbed it "easily the best game ever on the Age of Sail".

== See also ==
- Wooden Ships and Iron Men (1987)
