= Shenandoah (wargame) =

Board wargame

- Designers: S. Craig Taylor; Stephen Peek
- Publishers: Battleline Publications
- Publication: 1975
- Genres: American Civil War board wargame

Shenandoah, subtitled "A Civil War Game of the Valley Campaigns — 1862 and 1864", is a board wargame published by Battleline Publications in 1975 that simulates two campaigns of the American Civil War: the 1862 Valley Campaign of Confederate general Stonewall Jackson, and the 1864 Union offensive drive up the Shenandoah Valley. Despite favorable critical reception, the game was complex and introduced several new mechanics, and was not popular with players.

== Background ==
The Shenandoah Valley was the scene of two intense campaigns during the American Civil War. In both, a light Confederate force used guerrilla tactics against numerically superior Union forces.

In 1862, The Confederate general Stonewall Jackson led his army into the Shenandoah Valley in order to draw Union armies away from the Union's Peninsular Campaign. Jackson's subterfuge and surprise movements had the desired effect, as several Union armies were sent to the Valley in an unsuccessful attempt to pin down Jackson's army.

In 1864, Ulysses Grant, in one of his first acts as overall Union commander, ordered a Union army to march up the Shenandoah Valley, using a scorched earth policy, in an attempt to reduce Confederate supplies coming from the Valley. In May and June, a Union army led first by Major General Franz Sigel, and then Major General David Hunter eventually captured Lynchburg, Virginia. Confederate general Robert E. Lee sent an army under General Jubal A. Early to harass the Union forces, hoping to divert Union forces away from the Siege of St. Petersburg. In June and July, Early used many of the same tactics as Stonewall Jackson had two years earlier, and was successful in drawing more Union troops into the Shenandoah Valley after Hunter was unable to pin him down.

In August, Grant replaced Hunter with General Philip Sheridan, and Early and Sheridan began a campaign of feints and counterthrusts as Sheridan tried to bring Early to battle. Early managed to evade Sheridan and harass Union troops until mid-September, when Sheridan caught Early's army by surprise and won a convincing victory at the Battle of Opequon. From that point, Sheridan was on the offensive, smashing the Valley's war economy, and starving the Confederate forces of needed supplies in the last months of the war.

== Description ==
Shenandoah is a two-player wargame in which one player assumes the role of Union forces, and the other controls the Confederates. The game has two levels of rules, Basic and Advanced, as well as optional rules. Critic Nicky Palmer called the Basic game "pretty complex", the Advanced game "extremely complicated", and thought the option rules added "still more esoteric possibilities". Jon Freeman agreed, calling the combat rules "overly convoluted". However, Donald Mack thought it was a "perfectly feasible" game, calling the rules "comprehensive". The 375 counters are used for infantry, cavalry, leaders, artillery, horse artillery, supply, forts and devastation. Rules cover various formations, chain of command, wagons and supply, stacking effects, tactical combat, step reduction, garrisons, weather, forced marches, hidden formations, partisans, and cavalry raids. The B&O rail line plays an important part in many scenarios.

=== Movement ===
In most board wargames of this time, an attacking unit has a certain number of Movement Points (MP) per turn that are only used to move the unit a given number of hexes. In Shenandoah, MP are used for movement, but one MP must also be spent to attack an enemy unit. If the result of the attack has been resolved, and the unit still has MP left, the player can choose to spend another MP to attack again. This can be especially effective if the enemy unit has been thrown into disorder by the first attack. The player can continue to press the attack as long as the attacking unit has MP. However, Walter Brink and Richard Giberson warned against using all MP in this way, pointing out "It is also a good idea to have some movement factors left to get out of the battle if things go wrong."

=== Combat ===
After an attacking unit has spent a Movement Point to attack, it is resolved based on the formations of the attacker and the defender (column or battle formation), the strength of both forces, the terrain, and the state of supply of both forces. Both players roll a die modified by the above factors, and the two rolls are cross-indexed on the appropriate table, which then indicates the effect on the defender. Critic Donald Mack pointed out that this resolution usually favors the defender, and warned "battle should not be offered or sought lightly." Mack especially thought this was more crucial for the weaker Confederate forces, commenting that the Confederate player "must avoid prolonged stand-up fights in which he is the attacker." Mack suggested that the Confederate player instead isolate and eliminate weaker stacks of Union units, and capture and destroy wagons bringing Union supply, noting, "this strategy can throw a powerful force so off-balance that initiative is never gained [by Union forces]."

After each attack has been resolved, the defender can counter-attack without expending either MP or supply.

=== Stacking of counters ===
To overcome the board wargame problem of stacking too many counters on the same hex, the stack of counters is replaced by a single lettered counter, and the stack is placed at the side of the board on the corresponding letter. To better simulate the guerrilla war aspect of the Confederate forces, the Confederate stacks are hidden behind a screen, leaving the Union player to estimate how many forces are represented by the lettered counter on the map.

=== Supply ===
Units fight and move at their best rate when they are within reach of supplies, represented by slow-moving wagons. However, Donald Mack suggested that occasionally there are advantages to leaving the supply wagons behind: "Like [Stonewall] Jackson, the bold commander must be prepared to outrun his supplies in order to gain an advantageous position while bringing [supplies] up in time before the fighting begins in earnest." Supply wagons can be captured and either destroyed or used for supply by the captors, and both players must consider whether to divert troops from battle to guard the wagons.

=== Leaders ===
A number of counters represent historically important leaders. These can boost the attack factor of forces they command, allow the units to force march, and increase a unit's chances of recovering from disorder resulting from combat.

=== Scenarios ===
Nineteen scenarios are provided. Seventeen of them are relatively short 2–4 hour scenarios — several taking only one turn — that cover the individual battles and skirmishes fought in both 1862 and 1864. Two longer scenarios cover the entire Valley campaigns of 1862 and 1864, and each one takes many hours to complete.

=== Victory conditions ===
Victory points are rewarded at the end of each turn for elimination of enemy units, forcing the enemy to retreat, holding certain objectives (defined by the scenario) at the end of the turn, or forcing the opponent to bring more supplies into the game. The player with the most victory points at the end of the game is the winner. As critics Walter Brink and Richard Giberson pointed out, "One must make a careful study of these values before playing the game. Otherwise, you may up winning the battle and losing on points." Richard Berg noted that because bringing extra supplies onto the board gave Victory Points to one's opponent, "a Player must campaign very cautiously, conserving his energies and striking only when necessary."

== Publication history ==
Shenandoah was designed by S. Craig Taylor and Stephen Peek and published by Battleline in 1975. The game did not sell well, and critic Jon Freeman commented five years later that this game "was way ahead of its time and was poorly appreciated when released."

== Reception ==
In a 1976 poll conducted by SPI to determine the most popular board wargames in North America, Shenandoah did not fare well, rating only 176th out of 202 games.

In Issue 13 of Jagdpanther, Walter Brink and Richard Giberson called this "a complex game even in its simplest form, though it is immensely enjoyable." They noted, "The game is something of a revolution in mechanics, and at first takes some time to play a single turn. However, once the system is understood and committed to memory, play goes considerably faster." They also warned that "one must not use up his Movement Factor just getting [adjacent to an enemy unit] as there is a Movement Point cost to attack." Brink and Giberson concluded, "The game is well developed and complete. Battleline Publications has, to the time of this game, produced only three titles, and it says much about a company that they tested them to near perfection before release."

In Issue 11 of the British wargaming magazine Phoenix, Donald Mack suggested that players use "the advanced rules plus the optional cavalry raid rule to see [this game] at its best." Mack only had one criticism of the game, pointing out that although it gives the same rate of movement to both sides, historically the Confederates marched further in a day than Union forces. Otherwise, Mack found this "a rather unusual and highly interesting game with particular appeal to the gamer who prefers fencing to slugging, who likes a reasonably detailed game and who has an interest in the American Civil War in general and the Valley Campaign in particular." Mack concluded, "the type of gamer referred to above will not, in my opinion, be disappointed by acquiring a copy of this game."

In Issue 25 of Moves, game designer Richard Berg called this "the most interesting new game on the Civil War," and noted that this game "brings back the fine art of outsmarting your opponent, rather than bludgeoning him into submission." Berg pointed out "the emphasis is on feint and maneuver, and the designers have produced some very interesting refinements in their efforts to simulate this." Berg concluded, "The feel of the game is one of conducting a grueling, intense campaign against a shifty, intelligent opponent ... you have a thought-provoking and stimulating simulation of one of the more interesting theatres of the Civil War."

In the 1977 book The Comprehensive Guide to Board Wargaming, Nicky Palmer found the complexity, number of scenarios and many options overwhelming, calling it "Not so much a wargame, more a way of life!" Palmer also found the many types of terrain on the map "bewildering". Despite this, Palmer noted that the game would be "Rewarding for those interested in the campaign."

In the 1980 book The Complete Book of Wargames, game designer Jon Freeman commented that despite the game's complexity, "Shenandoah has a wonderful feel for the quasi-guerilla warfare that characterized the valley campaigns." Freeman warned "Surprise is a key factor, but this is not just a combat game; organization, planning, and an iron nerve are all vital." Freeman gave this game an Overall Evaluation of "Good (but not for everyone)", concluding, "This is one of the best operational simulations on this era available — but it's decidedly not for the timid."

== Other reviews and commentary ==
- Fire & Movement #19
- Campaign #71
- Strategy & Tactics #67
