= Wings: A Game of Plane to Plane Combat in World War I =

1981 WWI aerial combat board wargame

Wings
- Yaquinto 1st edition cover, 1981
- Designers: S. Craig Taylor
- Illustrators: John Hagen
- Publishers: Yaquinto Publications
- Publication: 1981
- Genres: World War I aerial combat

Wings: A Game of Plane to Plane Combat in World War I is a board wargame published by Yaquinto Publications in 1981 that simulates aerial combat during World War I. The game won a Charles S. Roberts Award.

== Description ==
Wings is a game for several players, where some of the players control Allied aircraft and the other players control Axis aircraft.

=== Gameplay ===
The 3-piece isomorphic hex grid map displays the typical trench landscape of the Western Front, and over 300 counters representing many of the aircraft flown by various air forces during the war, including:

- French: Voisin V, Nieuport 11, Nieuport 12, Breguet 14B.2, Hanriot HD.1, Salmson 2A.2
- British: Spad VII, Spad XIII, Short 184, Airco D.H.2, Sopwith 1½ Strutter, F.E.2b, B.E.2, Sopwith Pup, R.E.8, Airco D.H.4, S.E.5a, Bristol F.2B, Sopwith Camel, Handley Page 0/400, Airco D.H.9, Sopwith Dolphin
- Italy: Caproni Ca.3, Pomilio PE
- Germany: Aviatik C.I, Fokker E.II, Albatros C.III, Rumpler 6B, Albatros D.II, Albatros D.III, Gotha G.IV, Halberstadt CL.II, Fokker Dr.I, Zeppelin Staaken R.VI, Pfalz D.III, Rumpler C.VII, Junkers J.I, Albatros D.Va, Fokker D.VII. Lohner L, Phonix D.I

There are also counters for Zeppelins, barrage balloons, observation balloons, buildings, mountains, hills, trenches, woods, ships and clouds.

The game includes statistics for 50 different aircraft, including firing arcs, numbers of guns and fire-power, target characteristics, top speed, and climb, dive and maneuver figures.

Each player is given a "Command sheet" that are used to write orders for each aircraft during one turn, which are then revealed simultaneously. (Critic Charles Vasey, a chartered accountant by trade, warned, "unless you are (like me) cursed with a job which requires the filling in of documents with considerable care (because you may have to explain it in court) then you will find people make all manner of mistakes early on in filling out plots.)

Changes in altitude and banking are taken into account when calculating firing arcs.

Optional rules include fixing jammed guns. A separate game called "The Duel", with special rules for one-on-one combat, is included. A third game called "Mass Game", representing large combats involving over thirty aircraft, drops the simultaneous movement for a more simplified movement system involving a random "who goes first " system similar to that used in Circus Maximus.

=== Scenarios ===
The game comes with over twenty scenarios, including: hunting Zeppelins (either solitaire or two-player); downing barrage balloons or observation balloons; surprise encounters; ambushes; observation missions; photographic missions; low-level tactical bombing; laying smoke screens; strafing; dawn patrols; bombing strategic targets; shipping attacks; and a harbour attack.

== Publication history ==
Game designer S. Craig Taylor created Wings, which was published by Yaquinto Publications in 1981. Yaquinto planned to come out with at least one expansion offering a fourth game within the game, as well as new aircraft and scenarios, but the company went out of business before the expansion could be published.

Excalibre Games republished the game in 1993 with the title Wings: World War One Plane to Plane Combat 1916–1918.

== Reception ==
In Issue 52 of the British wargaming magazine Perfidious Albion, Charles Vasey wrote, "This is a good game, a sensible set of rules, pleasing counters and on balance my choice over Ace of Aces." Vasey found the rulebook to be very well organized, noting, "The charts are well laid out, especially useful being a clear note of altitude and bank. The manoeuvres are also neatly summarised on the back of the rules ... The manoeuvres are all neatly summed up with clear notes (and illustrations) in the body of the rules. I found no trouble in plotting fairly complex manoeuvres." Vasey concluded, "another fine game ... that believes in giving you as much as it knows on the subject. It repays careful play and some learning."

Is Issue 20 of The Wargamer, Jim Hind admired many things about this game, but pointed out there were problems caused by the hex grid map, and by quantizing aircraft speed into 20 mph increments. Hind suggested various ways these two points could be mitigated. Hind found the main game to be overly complex, but liked the Mass Game because of its simplified rules. Two issues later, Hind compared the play of the game to actual World War I accounts of the flying characteristics of the aircraft. Although Hind thought "the relative turning abilities of rotary and stationary-engined fighters, is well brought out in the game," Hind did note that due to "a curious artefact of the hex grid", tighter-turning aircraft would actually come under fire first from a less maneuvrable opponent. Hind also warned players to "Study the Data Cards" for strengths and weaknesses of opponents. Hind concluded by urging players to be bold: "Unlike your historical counterpart, you will always survive to blame the dice."

In Issue 15 of the French games magazine Jeux & Stratégie, Frederic Blayo commented, "This game is a well-executed tactical simulation, representing all types of aircraft that took part, as well as most of the combat equipment used. It not only simulates aerial combat (planes versus planes), but also simulates all types of aviation interventions during the war: attacks by Zeppelins, mobile balloons, or observation balloons, bombing of ships, infantry positions, tank convoys, or even artillery positions (more than 20 scenarios in total)."

== Awards ==
At the 1981 Charles S. Roberts Awards, the first edition of Wings won in the category "Best Twentieth-Century Game".
