= 7th Cavalry =

7th Cavalry may refer to:

== Corps ==
- 7th Guards Cavalry Corps, a unit of the Soviet Red Army during the Second World War

== Divisions ==
- 7th Cavalry Division (France), a unit of the French Army during the First World War
- 7th Cavalry Division (German Empire), a unit of the German Army during the First World War
- 7th Cavalry Division (Russian Empire), a unit of the Russian Empire

== Brigades ==
- 7th Indian Cavalry Brigade, a unit of the British Indian Army during the First World War
- 7th Cavalry Brigade (United Kingdom), a unit of the British Army during the Napoleonic Wars and the First World War
- 7th Cavalry Brigade (United States), a unit of the United States Army during the Second World War, now the 1st Armored Division

== Regiments ==
- 2/7th Cavalry Commando Regiment (Australia)
- 7th Light Cavalry, a regiment of the British Indian Army during the First and Second World Wars
- 7th Cavalry Regiment, a unit of the United States Army
- 7th Arkansas Cavalry Regiment, a Confederate regiment during the American Civil War
- 7th Illinois Cavalry Regiment, a Union regiment during the American Civil War
- 7th Indiana Cavalry Regiment, a Union regiment during the American Civil War
- 7th Iowa Cavalry Regiment, a Union regiment during the American Civil War
- 7th Kansas Cavalry Regiment, a Union regiment during the American Civil War
- 7th Kentucky Cavalry Regiment (Union), a Union regiment during the American Civil War
- 7th Michigan Cavalry Regiment, a Union regiment during the American Civil War
- 7th Mississippi Cavalry Regiment, a Confederate regiment during the American Civil War
- 7th Missouri Cavalry Regiment (Union), a Union regiment during the American Civil War
- 7th New York Cavalry Regiment, a Union regiment during the American Civil War
- 7th Ohio Cavalry Regiment, a Union regiment during the American Civil War
- 7th Pennsylvania Cavalry Regiment, a Union regiment during the American Civil War
- 7th Tennessee Cavalry Regiment (Union), a Union regiment during the American Civil War
- 7th Texas Cavalry Regiment, a Confederate regiment during the American Civil War
- 7th Virginia Cavalry Regiment, a Confederate regiment during the American Civil War
- 7th West Virginia Cavalry Regiment, a Union regiment during the American Civil War

== Other units ==
- 7th Rhode Island Cavalry Squadron, a Union squadron during the American Civil War

== Entertainment and games ==
- 7th Cavalry (film), a 1956 American Western film starring Randolph Scott and Barbar Hale
- 7th Cavalry (wargame), a 1976 board wargame that simulates the Battle of Little Big Horn
