= Little Big Horn: Custer's Last Stand =

Wargame published by TSR in 1976

- Manufacturers: TSR Hobbies, Inc.
- Designers: Gary Gygax
- Years active: 1976
- Genres: Wargame

Little Big Horn: Custer's Last Stand is a wargame published by TSR in 1976 that simulates the Battle of Little Big Horn.

== Description ==
Little Big Horn is a 2-player wargame in which one player controls the forces of George Custer, and the other player controls the forces under Sitting Bull and Crazy Horse. The map is printed on oilskin rather than paper.

== Publication history ==
The battle had already been simulated in The Battle of the Little Big Horn published by Waddingtons in 1962. But 1976 marked the centennial of the battle, and three small games publishers brought new games about the battle to Origins II: Custer's Last Stand by Battleline; 7th Cavalry by Attack Wargaming Association; and Little Big Horn: Custer's Last Stand, a game designed by Gary Gygax, with interior art by Brian Blume, and published by TSR.

Gygax described the game in 2003 as "the tactical conflict between the 7th Cavalry under Lt. Col. George Armstrong Custer and the various 'Sioux' and allied Indian tribes. ... The LBH game was actually quite accurate, and the Cavalry had a fair chance to triumph, just as Custer had hoped — if they stayed together and had their pack train with ammunition with them."

TSR's game did not sell well; neither did the two competing games introduced at Origins. As Gygax recalled, "Of course, all three companies suffered sales-wise, as interested gamers were divided."

== Reception ==
In Issue 28 of Moves (August/September 1976), game designer Richard Berg called the oilskin map "great for durability — horrible for playing." He also thought "the game just does not hang together well enough to justify the design." He concluded "Play is somewhat predictable and there's not much that either side can do to change it."*

== Reviews ==
- Panzerfaust and Campaign #75
