= Frigate Bird =

Frigate Bird or variation, may refer to:

- Frigatebird (Fregatidae family): frigate bird seabirds
- Frigate Bird (6 May 1962) a nuclear bomb explosion test, part of Operation Dominic
- USS Frigate Bird, a U.S. Navy ship name

== See also ==
- Frigate (disambiguation)
- Bird (disambiguation)
