= Fury in the West =

Civil War board wargame published in 1977

Original Battleline edition, 1977

Fury in the West is a board wargame published by Battleline in 1977 that simulates the Battle of Shiloh during the American Civil War. It used several new rules that were unique at the time, but received mixed reviews.

== Background ==
In April 1862, General Ulysses S. Grant moved the Union Army of the Tennessee deep into Confederate territory near Pittsburg Landing in southern Tennessee. On 6 April 1962, Confederate General Albert Sidney Johnston commanding the Army of Mississippi launched a surprise attack that caught Grant unawares, and threw the Union army back with heavy losses. After a day of heavy fighting in which General Johnston was killed, his second-in-command, P.G.T. Beauregard, faced a difficult decision: force his exhausted Confederate troops to try and finish off the Union army, or rest until the morning and hope that Union reinforcements would not arrive before then.

== Description ==
Fury in the West is a two-player board wargame in which one player controls the Union forces of Ulysses S. Grant, while the other player controls the Confederate forces of Albert Johnston. If the Confederate player can force a gap in the Union forces and take Pittsburg Landing on the first day, this will prevent Union reinforcements from arriving on the second day, and make a Confederate victory more likely. If the Confederate player is unable to prevent reinforcements from arriving, the Union player is likely to win.

The sequence of play is the "I Go, You Go" alternating series of turns typical of wargames of the early 1970s: first one side moves and fires, then the other side does the same. This completes one game turn, which represents one hour of game time.

The Basic game, designed for new players, uses only the simplest units and strategies. The Advanced game add rules for artillery, column formation, attacks from flank and the rear, prisoners, night combat, and surprise attack by the Confederates.

Two new rules in both the Basic and Advanced games make the game unusual for its time:

1. Any time a unit moves, it loses a certain number of "stragglers", reducing its strength. (The number of stragglers is doubled if the movement is due to a forced retreat.) A unit that does not move for a turn regains one point of strength as stragglers rejoin the unit.
2. A unit's zone of control only extends to the three hexes in front of the unit, not the three hexes behind the unit. This makes each unit more vulnerable to attack from the rear.

Optional rules include: random initiative changes to determine which player moves first each turn; changes in set-up and reinforcements; gunboats; changes to stacking rules; the effect of leaders on combat; long range artillery fire; fog of war, timed moves, alternate Confederate setup, variable reinforcements, bayonet charges, capture of artillery, and multi-player rules.

Victory conditions depend on casualties inflicted, prisoners taken, officers lost, and possession of key strategic points.

=== Scenarios ===
Four shorter scenarios are offered, two for each day of the battle. The fifth scenario covers both days of the battle.

Avalon Hill edition, featuring artwork by Rodger B. MacGowan, 1979

== Publication history ==
Stephen Peek designed Fury in the West, which was published by Battleline in 1977. Two years later, Avalon Hill purchased the rights to the game, revised some of the rules, and published it with box cover art by Rodger B. MacGowan.

== Reception ==
Fury in the West received mixed reviews, with critics disagreeing over the new "straggler" rule.

In Issue 22 of the British wargaming magazine Perfidious Albion, Charles Vasey and Geoffrey Barnard discussed the game. Vasey called the game "surprisingly accurate with the stragglers not only representing men who did get lost but the fatigue of units continuously in combat. The player who can rest his men should win." Barnard replied, "A very interesting and enjoyable game, and compared with other games in the UK it must be considered pretty good value for the money." Vasey concluded, "An interesting game with undemanding rules which should be good for novice and buff." Barnard concluded, "Sufficient rules are included for players to vary the game, though probably the historical games will remain more interesting."

In his 1980 book The Best of Board Wargaming, Nick Palmer found the rules to be "exceptionally clear and well conceived, with an extensive example of play dispelling any ambiguities which might remain." Palmer liked the new "straggler" rule, calling it "ingenious and I think unique." However, Palmer questioned whether the game had much flexibility in strategy, saying, "first the Confederates mass and hammer away trying to create a gap in the Union line, then the Union does the same." Despite this, he concluded, "One gets a physically excellent game, and Civil War connoisseurs should have it in their collection."

In the 1980 book The Complete Book of Wargames, game designer Jon Freeman was considerably less impressed with the "straggler" rule, saying that it "uses the wrong means to achieve its ends [...] every time a unit moves it loses stragglers: sheer folly!" Freeman called the map "a travesty", pointing out that the key defensive placement known as the Sunken Road was in the wrong spot. He also questioned the lack of a morale rule, calling it "a key ingredient of the battle." Freeman concluded by giving the game a rating of only "Fair", saying, "Let's face it: This is a buzzard — at least as a simulation. As a game, it's not bad because Shiloh can be a nip-and-tuck affair until the end of the first day."

In Issue 9 of Fire & Movement, Al Bisasky commented, "I really dig the hell out of it [...] It is enjoyable to play, albeit a bit slowly, and presents enough of a challenge to keep me interested enough to want to play it again." Bisalsky concluded, "It captures faithfully the most important factors which decided the actual outcome of the battle: command control and heavy casualties."

In Issue 54 of Moves, Steve List called the game "good looking" and the counters "striking". He gave the game a grade of "B", saying, "The large hexes and the relatively small number of units in play make for an uncrowded map. However the game itself is not as beautiful as its components. It is solid and competent but not outstanding."

== Other reviews and commentary ==
- Campaign #81
- Games & Puzzles #66
