= USS Dauntless =

Three ships of the United States Navy have been named Dauntless.

- USS Dauntless (1861), was a side-wheel steamer renamed USS Mignonette after her transfer to the Union Navy 30 September 1862.
- USS Dauntless (ID-1002), was a motor patrol boat used during World War I.
- USS Dauntless (PG-61), was a yacht originally called Delphine, built by Horace Dodge, co-founder of Dodge Brothers, for his personal use and later used by the Navy during World War II.

== See also ==
- USCGC Dauntless
