= USCGC Steadfast =

United States Coast Guard cutter

- USCGC Steadfast (WMEC-623)

History

United States
- Builder: American Ship Building Company, Lorain, Ohio
- Laid down: 2 May 1966
- Launched: 24 June 1967
- Commissioned: 7 October 1968
- Decommissioned: 1 February 2024
- Refit: 31 January 1994
- Home port: Astoria, Oregon
- Identification: MMSI number: 367265000; Callsign: NSTF
- Nickname(s): "El Tiburón Blanco"
- Status: Transferred to Malaysian Maritime Enforcement Agency

General characteristics
- Displacement: 759 tons
- Length: 210 ft 6 in (64.16 m)
- Beam: 34 ft (10 m)
- Draft: 10 ft 6 in (3.20 m) max
- Propulsion: 2 x V16 2550 horsepower ALCO 251B diesel engines
- Speed: max 18 knots; 2,700 mile range
- Range: cruise 14 knots; 6,100 mile range
- Complement: 12 officers, 63 enlisted
- Sensors & processing systems: 2 x AN/SPS-64 navigation and surface search radar.
- Armament: 1 × Mk 38 25mm chain gun; 2 × M2HB .50 caliber machine gun
- Aircraft carried: HH-65 Dolphin

USCGC Steadfast (WMEC-623) was a United States Coast Guard medium endurance cutter in commission for 56 years. Commissioned in 1968, Steadfast was home ported in St. Petersburg, Florida for her first 24 years of service. In 1992, she was decommissioned for Major Maintenance Availability (MMA) to extend her service another 25 years. Following MMA in February 1994, Steadfast was re-commissioned and home ported in Astoria, Oregon until her decommissioning on February 1, 2024.

Steadfast completed over 330 Search and Rescue cases, interdicted over 1.6 million pounds of marijuana and 27,700 pounds of cocaine, seized over 65 vessels, and stopped over 3500 undocumented migrants on the high seas from entering the United States. Steadfast was the first, and is one of only two cutters (the other is USCGC Dauntless), to have a gold marijuana leaf painted on her superstructure, symbolizing one million pounds of marijuana seized. Legend holds Steadfast was named "El Tiburón Blanco" (Spanish for "The White Shark") by Colombian drug smugglers in the 1970s for being such a nemesis to their illegal drug operations. Steadfast's crew used the symbol of "El Tiburón Blanco" as one of their logos to epitomize Steadfast's aggressive law enforcement posture.

On 21 September 1978, Douglas DC-3 N407D of Argosy Airlines crashed into the Caribbean Sea whilst on a ferry flight from Fort Lauderdale International Airport to José Martí International Airport, Havana. All four people on board were killed. The aircraft disappeared off radar screens at 12:43 local time (17:43 UTC). A search was initiated, which Steadfast coordinated, but was called off on 24 September without any trace of N407D being found.

USCGC Steadfast completed her final Coast Guard patrol on December 18, 2023 and was decommissioned in Astoria on February 1, 2024 after 56 years of service. Upon decommissioning the ship entered Excess Defense Article status and proceeded to Baltimore, Maryland where she was made available to sale to other countries via the Coast Guard's Foreign Military Sales Program.

On August 3, 2024 the acting director-general of the Malaysian Maritime Enforcement Agency (MMEA), Vice-Admiral Datuk Saiful Lizan Ibrahim, announced that Steadfast was being prepared in Baltimore for MMEA service and was expected in Malaysia in the first quarter of 2025. In the event, the MMEA did not take formal possession of the cutter until September 6, 2025. She departed the United States with a Malaysian crew on September 18 and arrived in Port Klang, Malaysia on November 4. At that time the MMEA planned to commission her as the KM Bendahara and operate her from a new homeport in the state of Sabah in East Malaysia.

== Gallery ==
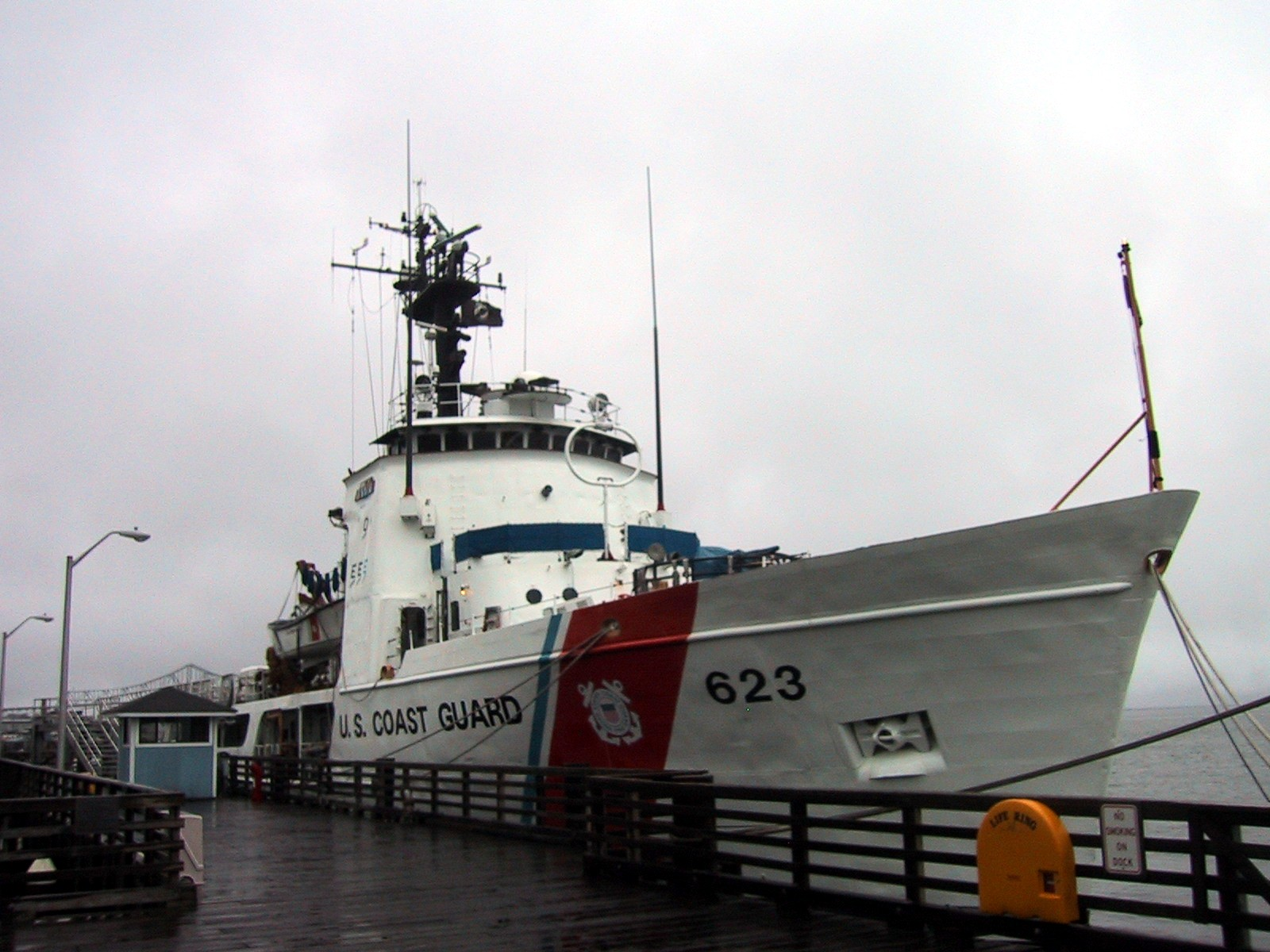
Steadfast pier-side at Astoria

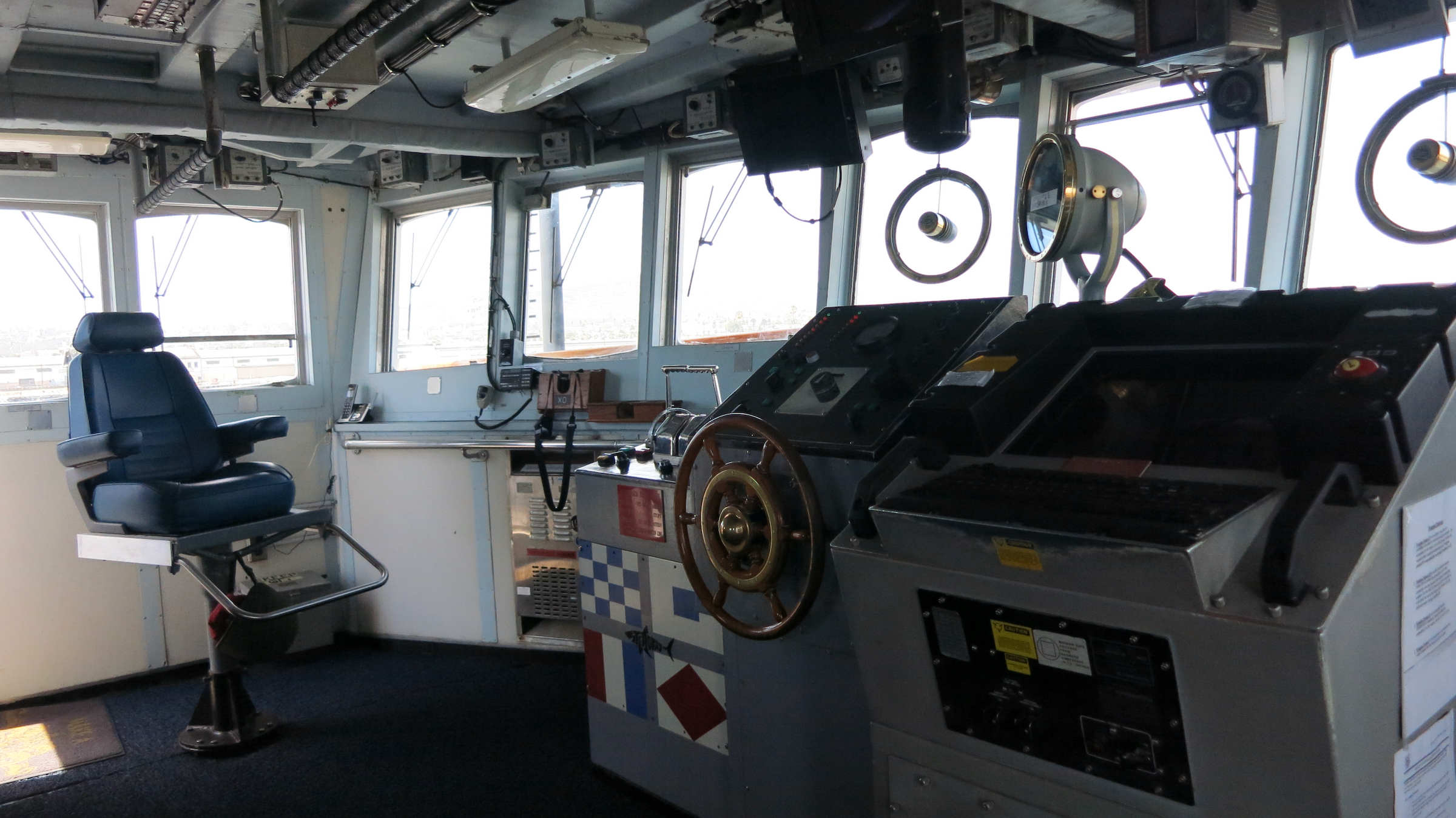
Bridge aboard Steadfast

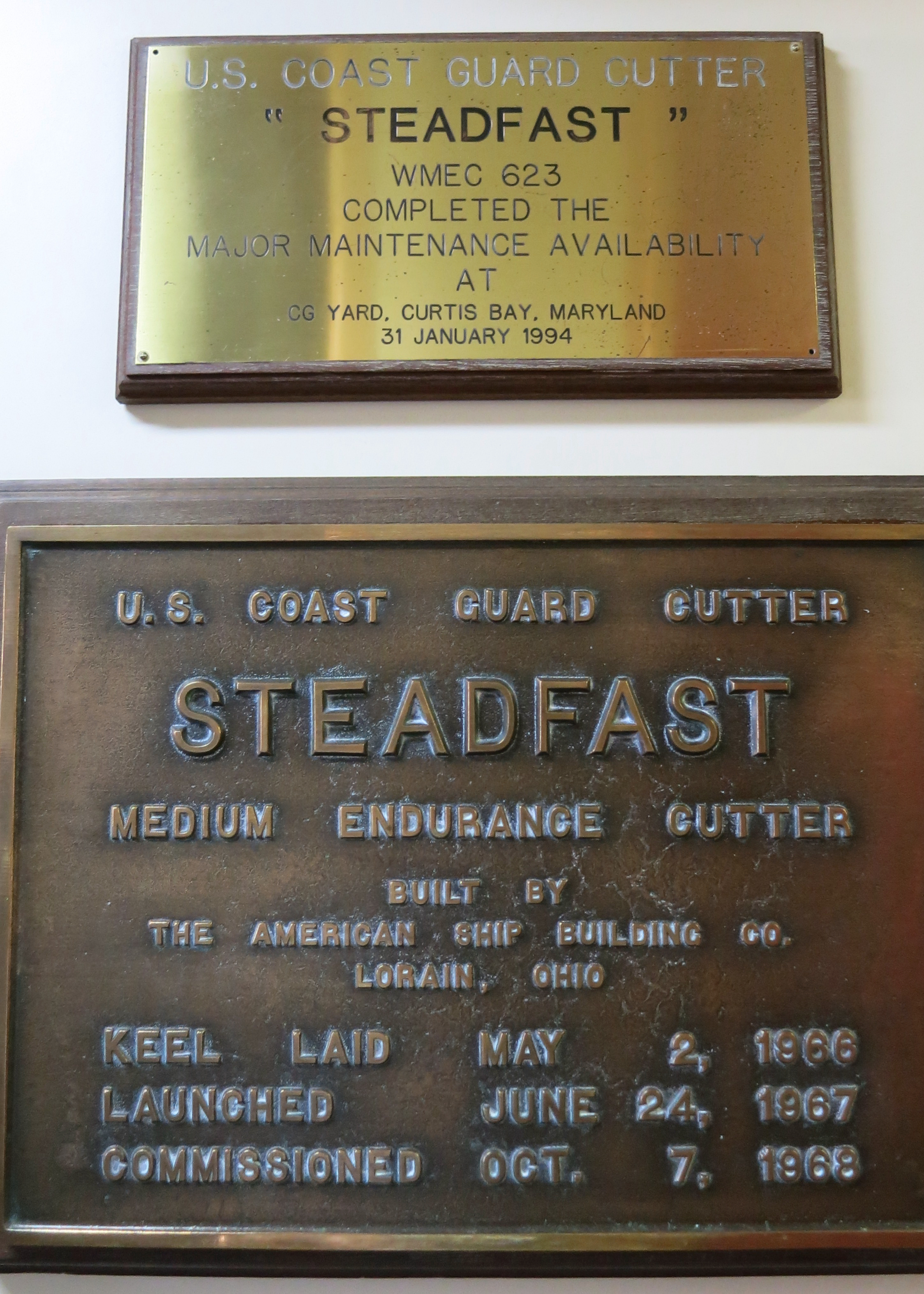
Steadfast's builder's plate
