= Qvadriga =

2014 video game

- Developer: Turnopia
- Publisher: Slitherine Software
- Platforms: Android, iOS, Windows
- Release: March 4, 2014
- Genres: Turn-based tactics, Racing game
- Mode: Single-player

Qvadriga is a chariot racing video game set in Ancient Rome. The game is turn-based and played from a top-down perspective. Players assume the role of a chariot team owner, managing a stable of drivers (aurigae) and horses (quadrigae) between races, and issuing orders to the drivers during the race. Players begin competing in provincial circuits, with the aim to amass the fame and denarii required to race at, and ultimately achieve victory at, the Circus Maximus in Rome.

The game was developed by Turnopia and released for Microsoft Windows in March 2014. Android and iOS versions followed in April, but are no longer available. The game had a generally positive critical response, with PC gaming website Rock Paper Shotgun declaring it the best racing game of 2014.

== Gameplay ==
The player assigns their chariot an order as it enters the back straight. Other chariots jockey for position, some horses lie dead on the track.

Qvadriga is a turn-based tactics chariot racing game. Players assume the role of a chariot team owner, and they must assign drivers (aurigae) and horses (quadrigae) to compete in races. Races take place over three laps from a top-down perspective and are held on Greek hippodromes or Roman circuses. In the hippodrome races, chariots line up on a starting line in the middle of the arena; whereas in the circuses, chariots burst out of the curved carceres located at an end.

Races are divided into 10-second time periods which constitute a turn, the game can be set to pause at every turn or run seamlessly in real-time. At each turn, the player can issue an order to the driver; they may change speed, change lane, attack or defend against the other competitors. Players must control their speed while cornering or their chariot may flip, causing the horses to drag the riders along the ground by the reins. As the race progresses, fallen horses and chariots may form obstacles on the track. Victory in races awards fame, which allows the team to compete in more prestigious arenas; and denarii, which can be invested in upgrading the drivers, horses, and chariots. The monetary reward may be increased by successfully betting on your own victory. Rock Paper Shotgun published an after action report detailing the turn-by-turn decisions and scenarios present during a typical race.

The ultimate goal of the game is to win at the most prestigious arena in the empire, the Circus Maximus in Rome.

== Development ==
Qvadriga was developed by Spanish video game designer Daniel Lopez Soria operating under the Turnopia label. He was initially inspired to create the game by the 1979 chariot racing board game Circus Maximus. Qvadriga features forty-three hippodromes and circuses, all of which Lopez modelled after real-life historical examples. Lopez used satellite and aerial imagery in his research, and consulted John H. Humphrey's 1986 reference work Roman Circuses: Arenas for Chariot Racing. He was also able to visit circuses nearby to him on the Iberian peninsula, such as those in Mérida, Miróbriga, and Toledo. To create the artwork for the venues, Lopez turned to Eduardo Barragán, who he discovered after seeing Barragán's 3D reconstructions of Ancient Rome on YouTube. (Note: Eduardo Barragán's channel on YouTube) Pedro Alcaide composed the soundtrack.

An early beta version of the game was released in May 2012. A further beta was announced in October 2013 after Slitherine Software became the publisher. This version added a campaign mode set across multiple arenas with different attributes, and the real-time turn mode. The game was released in March 2014 for Microsoft Windows, for which Mark Churms provided the box art. Versions for Android and iOS followed in June 2014.

== Reception ==
Reception

Aggregate score
Aggregator	Score
Metacritic	72/100

Review scores
Publication	Score
Eurogamer	6/10
Pocket Gamer	4/5
Digitally Downloaded	4/5
Softpedia	4/5

Reviews aggregation website Metacritic awarded the PC version 72/100, indicating a lukewarm critical response. Write-ups not included in the Metacritic calculation, such as those from Rock Paper Shotgun and Wargamer, as well as coverage of the mobile version, were more positive. Following a positive review in March 2014, Rock Paper Shotgun named it the best racing game of 2014 in their "Bestest Bests" Game of the Year series of articles in December. Softpedia named it runner-up racing game of the year in their annual round-up.

Reviewers generally found that while the graphics were unappealing, the interface was effective at conveying information and controlling the action. Critics found the gameplay tense and engaging, with some highlighting situations where surviving a race, or successfully attacking an opposing team, was more important strategically than winning an event. The lack of multiplayer was noted by some as a missed opportunity, though the developer acknowledged that implementing such a feature would require a huge effort.

Daniel Starkey, writing at Eurogamer, found the turn-by-turn racing exciting, but felt that randomness played too great a role in the outcome, a feeling which he confirmed through his self-admitted save-scumming style of play. The influence of randomness was further exacerbated towards the latter parts of the campaign where all the competing teams were evenly skilled and outfitted.

In 2022, publisher Slitherine announced Ancient Arenas: Chariots, a 3D spiritual successor to Qvadriga.
