= Trireme (game) =

Roman naval wargame

- Second edition by Decalset, 1973
- Designers: 1971 edition: Ed P. Smith; 1979 edition: Arnold Hendrick
- Publishers: 1971: Decalset; 1978: Battleline; 1979: Avalon Hill
- Publication: 1971
- Genres: Ancient naval combat

Trireme is a board wargame published by British game company Decalset in 1971 that simulates naval combat in ancient times.

== Description ==
Trireme is a two-player or two-team board wargame simulating naval combat using triremes.

=== Components ===
The original edition of the game comes with an unadorned map of staggered squares; markers for reefs, sandbanks and small islands; twenty plastic models of triremes (ten red, ten green); and plastic write on/wipe-off cards for bookkeeping.

=== Gameplay ===
Each player controls one or more triremes, and writes orders for each one for the coming turn. These orders are revealed at the same time, allowing for simultaneous movement. Ships can move at speeds of 1, 2, 3 or 4, but a ship can only travel at 4 for four moves, to reflect rower fatigue. The rules allow for ramming, archery, and boarding. Players keep track of damage to hulls, oars and rudders, as well as losses to crew, archers and soldiers.

There are also optional rules for the capture of ships.

=== Scenarios ===
The original 1971 edition does not include any scenarios — players have to plan their own battles. The Battleline edition includes eleven scenarios drawn from historic naval engagements from 494 BCE to 370 CE, and these are also included in the Avalon Hill edition.

Battleline's 1978 edition with cover art by John Hagen

== Publication history ==
Trireme, subtitled "Greek Naval Warfare", was designed by Ed P. Smith and published by the British game company Decalset in 1971. Decalset published a second edition in 1973. In the late 1970s, Battleline acquired the game license, and Arnold Hendrick revised the rules, added eleven scenarios and provided graphic design. The plastic galleys were replaced by rectangular cardboard counters, the square-grid map was replaced by a hex grid map, and the plastic cards were replaced by a pad of logsheets. The result, Trireme: A Battleline Game for Ancient Naval Warfare, was published in 1978 with cover art by John Hagen. Battleline sold the game to Avalon Hill, which published Trireme in 1979 with the subtitle "Tactical Game of Ancient Naval Warfare 494 BC-370 AD", using the same cover art from the Battleline edition.

== Reception ==
In Issue 7 of Moves, George Phillies reviewed the original Decalset edition and noted "A little practice makes it quite easy to write the code and move the vessels rapidly. The rules are simple and clear." Phillies suggested keeping battles fairly small, pointing out, "It is a delightful and fast moving game with one to three vessels on each side, somewhat slower with more vessels."

In The Guide to Simulations/Games for Education and Training, Martin Campion called this "A good fast game." Campion noted that although there was a lot of information to track, "the players' charts make bookkeeping easy."

== Other reviews and commentary ==
- Games & Puzzles #1 and #2
- Paper Wars #26
- Adventure Gaming #3
