= Wooden Ships and Iron Men (1987 video game) =

- Developer(s): Avalon Hill
- Publisher(s): Avalon Hill
- Composer(s): Eric Heberling
- Platform(s): Commodore 64
- Release: 1987
- Genre(s): Computer wargame

Wooden Ships and Iron Men is a computer wargame published by Avalon Hill in 1987 for the Commodore 64.

== Gameplay ==
This game is based on the naval board wargame, Wooden Ships and Iron Men. In the combat phase, the outcome of a battle is revealed when the winner is declared.

== Reception ==
In 1988, Dragon gave the game 2 out of 5 stars. Computer Gaming World stated that "many of the good qualities of the boardgame have been nicely translated", but criticized the computer opponent that was both weak and unable to fight in scenarios with land. It concluded with the hope that the game would presage the conversion of other large, classic boardgames to the computer. In 1990, the magazine gave the game two-plus stars out of five, and in 1993 gave it one-plus stars, calling it "A board game classic and a computer game disaster ... poor graphics and play value".

== See also ==
- Wooden Ships and Iron Men (1996)
