= Custer's Last Stand (wargame) =

Board wargame

Custer's Last Stand, subtitled "The Battle of Little Big Horn, June 25, 1876", is a board wargame published by Battleline in 1976 that simulates the Battle of the Little Big Horn.

== Background ==
In June 1876, as General George Custer and his 7th Cavalry Regiment approached a large encampment of Lakota Sioux, Northern Cheyenne, and Arapaho on the Little Big Horn River, he divided the regiment into three groups. As Custer advanced with only his group, a large force of native warriors under Sitting Bull and Crazy Horse attacked and annihilated Custer and his men.

== Description ==
Little Big Horn is a 2-player wargame in which one player controls the forces of Custer, and the other player controls the native forces. The game includes 120 die-cut counters and an 8-page rulebook. On a complexity scale of 1–10, game critic Jon Freeman rated it a relatively complex 8.

=== Gameplay ===
The game begins as Custer approaches some native encampments. Game critic Nick Palmer summarizes what follows as "When they spot each other, Custer sends off a 'runner' to get reinforcements, and the camps start to stir uneasily. Custer can choose to hang about waiting for powerful reinforcements, or he can make an immediate foray, with the chance of some victory points but a very grave danger of repeating history."

The game provides some optional "what if?" rules: What if Custer's force had been armed with Gatling guns or field artillery? What if Custer's reinforcements had arrived on time? What if Custer had brought his ammunition wagons with him?

== Publication history ==
This battle had already been simulated in The Battle of the Little Big Horn published by Waddingtons in 1962. But in 1976, the centennial of the battle, three small companies debuted new games about the battle at Origins II: 7th Cavalry by Attack Wargaming Association; Little Big Horn: Custer's Last Stand by TSR, and Custer's Last Stand by Battleline.

Battleline, a small games company that had created and developed all of their previous games in-house, instead bought and published a game that had been created and developed by freelancer Richard Zalud.

Battline's game did not sell well; neither did the two competing games introduced at Origins. As Gary Gygax, designer of TSR's rival game, recalled, "Of course, all three companies suffered sales-wise, as interested gamers were divided."

== Reception ==
In Issue 28 of Moves (August/September 1976), game designer Richard Berg called the components and rules "Physically quite professional [...] and mechanically quite simple." But he called the game nothing more than "a modular version of hide and seek." And he questioned the attempt to turn a one-sided massacre into a balanced game, saying, "There seems to be a lot of effort expended in making the situation gameable, but the result is only partially successful." He concluded, "The game does not hang together well enough to justify the design. [...] It will appeal mostly to collectors and afficionados of the period."*

In his 1977 book The Comprehensive Guide to Board Wargaming, Nick Palmer commented "Interesting choice of strategies, but some rule problems."

In the 1980 book The Complete Book of Wargames, game designer Jon Freeman questioned the replayability of the game, commenting, "The game is not badly done, but the situation is worth about one play; after that it becomes a bit stale." He also questioned making a game from such a lop-sided battle, and gave the game an Overall Presentation of only "Fair", saying, "The treatment [...] is probably as good as could be expected, but the situation itself is so bad that it drags the game down. A curious but stolid affair."

In The Guide to Simulations/Games for Education and Training, Martin Campion questioned the rules that deliberately warped historical accuracy, saying, "The game is faithful, not to what happened, but to what should have happened. A more historical problem could be created by requiring Custer to be at least moderately aggressive."

== Reviews ==
- Games & Puzzles #68
- Panzerfaust and Campaign #75
