= European quadriga =

The European quadriga is the designation of the quadrumvirate representing the European Union in its foreign relations, in particular with Greece concerning its common foreign and security policy (CFSP). The formerly known Troika is now being renamed as "Quadriga", to note the inclusion of the European Stability Mechanism (ESM) in the talks specially with the new Greek project of a third aid program amounting to 86 billion euros due to start on 20 August 2015.

"Quadriga" is the name inspired by Commission President, Jean-Claude Juncker for the new Greek project and creditors have now added the ESM to their collective and rebranded themselves "The Quadriga."

While talking about the quadriga (especially in the media) one refers to a decision group formed by the European Commission (EC), the European Central Bank (ECB), the International Monetary Fund (IMF) and the newly added European Stability Mechanism (ESM).
