= Submarine (wargame) =

1976 WWII board wargame

Original Battleline edition, 1976

Submarine is a board wargame published by Battleline Publications in 1976 that simulates submarine warfare during World War II. The following year, Avalon Hill bought the rights to the game, expanded the rules and republished it with new cover art.

== Description ==
Submarine is a two-player board wargame in which one player controls a submarine trying to sink a target such as a freighter or aircraft carrier, while the other player controls the target and anti-submarine defenses such as destroyer escorts. The map is a blank isomorphic hex grid in three sections, which can be transposed to provide new map space if a battle moves off the original board.

=== Gameplay ===
The game has basic and advanced rules. In the advanced game, the submarine commander uses a hidden movement system to plot the submarine's movement one turn in advance, and the submarine is not placed on the map board until it has been discovered by sonar, radar or visual means. At the same time, the anti-submarine player must plot the target's movement three turns in advance. However, the movement of the target's escorts do not need to be pre-plotted, allowing the escorts to immediately react as events unfold. Movement is simultaneous.

The game includes several scenarios, which can be combined into a long campaign game — critic Jon Freeman estimated that the complete game would take upwards of 40 hours to complete. The weapons and technology available depend on the year of the scenario, with technology becoming more efficient and deadlier as the war progresses.

Avalon Hill edition, 1977

== Publication history ==
Submarine was designed by Steve Peek and published by Battleline in 1976. Avalon Hill bought the rights to the game, and game designer Mick Uhl greatly expanded the advanced rules, adding much more complexity to the game. The new edition was released in 1977. Avalon Hill revised the rules and published a second edition in 1981.

== Reception ==
In Issue 55 of the British magazine Games & Puzzles, Nicky Palmer reviewed the Battleline edition and called it "an excellent simulation of tactical undersea warfare, with varying types of ships, submarines, and weaponry." The main drawback Palmer found was that the psychology of outguessing the opponent became the predominant strategy in the game, which "at times tends to make the game degenerate into a complex version of rock-paper-scissors." Palmer concluded, "Submarine is pleasant and easy to play, with basic rules simple enough for beginners, and an advanced version with enough detail to satisfy the keenest devotee of this type of combat." Four years later, in his 1977 book The Comprehensive Guide to Board Wargaming, Palmer added that the game displayed "Admirable accuracy."

In Issue 19 of the British wargaming magazine Perfidious Albion, Cliff Sayre called this "an innovative tactical [anti-submarine warfare] game" with a game system that was "easy to learn." Sayre concluded, "I recommend it. Here is a game you can play and enjoy."

In the 1980 book The Complete Book of Wargames, Jon Freeman reviewed Avalon Hill's first edition, and thought that "the hidden submarine movement so essential to the game is handled well enough that the overall playability remains high." However, Freeman questioned the replayability of the game over time, saying, "Perhaps the biggest flaw is that there is an aura of sameness from scenario to scenario; different weapon types and situations are not quite sufficient to keep play truly diversified over a long period." Freeman gave this game an Overall Evaluation of "Good."

In The Guide to Simulations/Games for Education and Training, Martin Campion reviewed Avalon Hill's first edition and noted that for classroom use, "More counters than are needed for the prepared scenarios are available as an aid to making one's own [scenarios]."

== Reviews ==
- Panzerfaust and Campaign #75

== Other recognition ==
A copy of Submarine is held in the collection of the Strong National Museum of Play (object 112.689.17).
