= Frigate Island =

Frigate Island may refer to:

- Frigate Island (Grenada), in the Grenadines in the Caribbean
- Frigate Island (Saint Lucia), off Saint Lucia in the Caribbean

== See also ==
- Frégate Island, in the Seychelles
