= Battleline Publications =

Board wargame publisher

Battleline Publications was a board wargame company founded by Steven Peek in 1973. Output was relatively low at first, with each game being funded by sales of the one before, but their games were generally well-respected. Several were re-published by Avalon Hill, and their second game, Wooden Ships and Iron Men designed by S. Craig Taylor is still considered one of the better games on its subject. They also put out a couple games that can be considered card wargames, and at one point became a division of Heritage Models.

== Products ==
- Air Force (1976)
- Alpha Omega (1977)
- Armor Supremacy (1979)
- Circus Maximus (1979)
- Custer's Last Stand (1976)
- Dauntless (1977)
- Flat Top (1977)
- Fury in the West (1977)
- Insurgency (1979)
- Machiavelli (1977)
- Naval War (1979)
- Objective: Atlanta (1977)
- Rally 'Round the Flag (1975)
- Samurai (1979)
- Seven Days Battles (1973)
- Shenandoah (1975)
- Ship 'o the Line (1976)
- Submarine (1976)
- Trireme (1979)
- Viva España (1977)
- Wooden Ships and Iron Men (1974)
