= Frigate: Sea War in the Age of Sail =

Board wargame

Frigate: Sea War in the Age of Sail is a board wargame published by Simulations Publications Inc. (SPI) in 1974 that simulates naval combat in the 18th and 19th century Age of Sail.

== Description ==
Frigate is a two-player game in which each player controls naval vessels engaged in combat. Twenty scenarios based on historical combats from 1702 to 1812 are included with the game, ranging from single ship-to-ship combat to large fleet engagements. Movement is preplotted and revealed simultaneously. Damage effects either crew efficiency or the ship's maneuvering capability. Wind direction is determined by two dice rolls each turn, one for direction and the other for velocity. A command control system attempts to simulate the discipline (or lack of discipline) with the various fleets. There are also rules for boarding.

The game comes with sections of 10" x 10.75" hex grid map that can be joined. As ships drift windward during battle, sections of map can be removed from one side of the map and added to the other side.

== Publication history ==
Frigate was designed by Jim Dunnigan and was published in SPI's flatpack plastic box in 1974.

== Reception ==
In his 1977 book The Comprehensive Guide to Board Wargaming, Nick Palmer liked the multinational aspect of the game but advised players to also try the rival game Wooden Ships and Iron Men (Avalon Hill, 1975), saying it was "an equally impressive alternative."

In the 1980 book The Complete Book of Wargames, game designer Jon Freeman called Frigate "a game of maneuver." However, he felt that "many other factors that could have added immeasurably to the game have been so abstracted as to the render them devoid of much of their attraction." For this reason, Freeman thought that Frigate "does not fully realize the potential of the situation it presents." Freeman did not like the simultaneous movement, since players often found it difficult to move their ship to within firing of range of another ship before it moved in an unanticipated direction. He concluded by giving the game an Overall Evaluation of "Good", saying, "The beginning scenarios aid in the learning of the game, but the intermediate scenarios are probably the best entertainment for the time invested."

In the December 1974 edition of Airfix Magazine, Bruce Quarrie commented "Altogether Frigate is an interesting game, widely adaptable and well worth the money." He further suggested that it could be combined with a land combat game of the same period, calling that concept "One way in which it could be used especially successful.".

In The Guide to Simulations/Games for Education and Training, Martin Campion thought that Frigate was "an excellent simulation on the fleet level. Less so for single ship action." He noted that the game was "very time consuming because of the necessity of writing down the move for each formation or shipo before moving." Campion concluded this game was ideal for classroom use, saying, "There are many opportunities for turning the large scenarios into multiplayer games."

== Other reviews and commentary ==
- Strategy & Tactics #44
- Moves #10
- Fire & Movement #13
- The Wargamer Vol.1 #4
- Phoenix #10
- JagdPanther #10
- American Wargamer Vol.2 #5
- Pursue & Destroy Vol.1 #3
