= Auriga (slave) =

Slave with gladiator status in ancient Rome

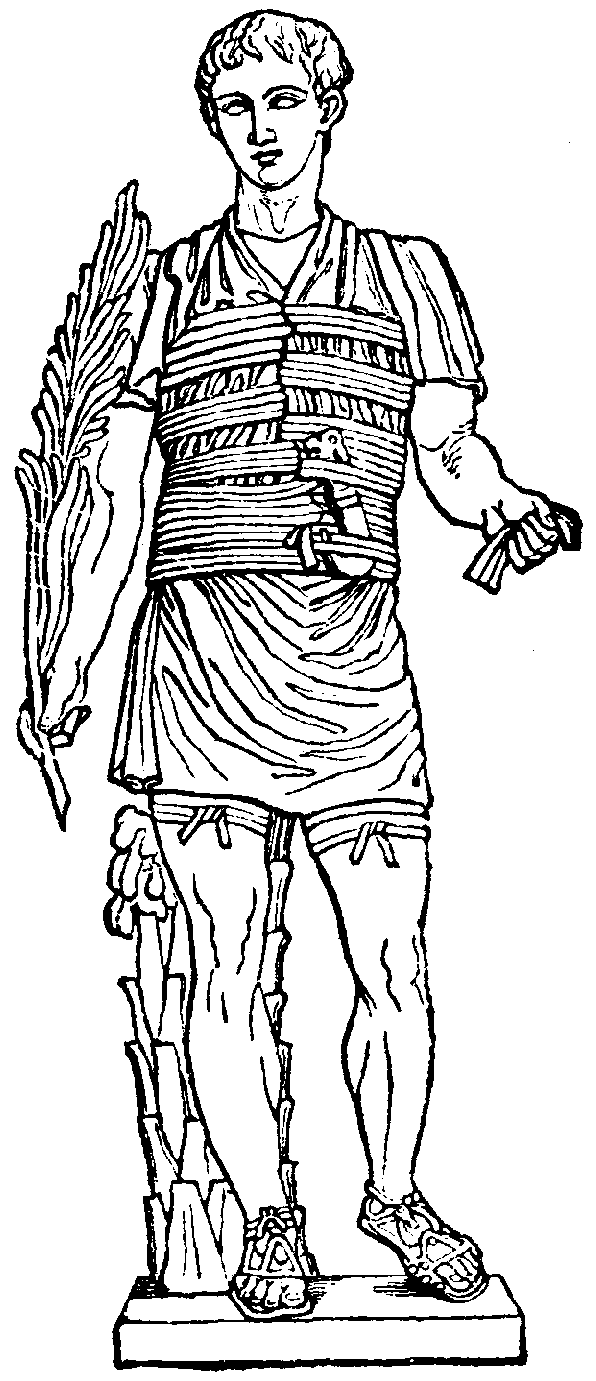

An auriga (plural aurigae) was a slave who drove vehicles in the Roman circuses. The position of auriga was a dangerous one as the aurigae drove with the reins wrapped around his waist. In case of accident, the auriga also wore a curved knife (falx) stuck in the waistband.

In ancient Rome, chariot racing was a favorite pastime. A successful charioteer’s prize earnings in a day could surpass a teacher’s annual earnings. Most charioteers were slaves, and many were foreigners, who entered the sport to garner fame and fortune. Aurigas were also employed as charioteers for important men. The auriga would drive a biga, the light vehicle powered by two horses, to transport some important Romans, mainly duces (military commanders). An auriga was a sort of "chauffeur" for important men and was carefully selected from among trustworthy slaves only.

It has also been speculated that this name was given to the slave who held a laurel crown, during Roman Triumphs, over the head of the dux, standing at his back but continuously whispering in his ears "Memento Mori" ("remember you are mortal") to prevent the celebrated commander Marcus Aurelius from losing his sense of proportion in the excesses of the celebrations.

The term became common in later times to indicate any biga driver.
