= Air Force Dauntless Expansion Kit =

Air Force Dauntless Expansion Kit is a 1978 wargame expansion kit published by Battleline Publications.

== Gameplay ==
Air Force Dauntless Expansion Kit is a game in which a large counter sheet is included, along with additional storage trays and order sheets, as well as a rules folder with extra information and more rules.

== Reception ==
Peter Merritt reviewed Air Force Dauntless Expansion Kit in Perfidious Albion #34 (December 1978) and stated that "Quite (gasp) a lot of (pant) extra aircraft (wheeze) really. Now I can do that Arnhem airdrop game, or the defence of Malta (having seen the CR 42, Italy's answer to the kamikaze, I can begin to appreciate how the Gladiators could hold off all comers). I should also like to point out that the 56 gun factors on the He 219 has nothing to do with my immediate resignation from RAF Bomber Command..... Anyway, there are enough types for any air game buff (stand by for letters) and should keep all of my other inmates - sorry, club members, occupied in the coming months. Thoroughly recommended."

== Reviews ==
- Perfidious Albion #35 (January 1979) p.9
- Fire & Movement #72
