= Stanley, Inc. =

Former information technology company

Stanley, Inc. (NYSE:SXE), acquired by CGI Group in 2010, was an information technology company based in Arlington, Virginia. Founded in 1966 as a small, entrepreneurial consulting company, it evolved into an employee-owned corporation with almost 5,000 full-time employees before being acquired by CGI Group Inc.

== Overview ==
Stanley made its initial public offering on the New York Stock Exchange in October 2006, selling 6.3 million shares for $13.00/share, raising $81.9 million. A majority of stocks are owned by officers, directors and employees (the latter through an employee stock ownership plan).

The company’s largest customer was the U.S. Army. It also held contracts with the U.S. Marine Corps, U.S. Navy, Department of State, and Department of Homeland Security. It operated facilities for the production of United States passports and for mailroom work and data entry for applications for U.S. visa and citizenship.

== Labor relations ==
The company controversially reduced wages when it took over the management of two facilities in St. Albans, Vermont, and Laguna Niguel, California in December 2007 which process immigration documents. The United Electrical workers union (UE) became involved in an effort to create a union to protect low paid employees who process immigration records. As it was about to assume control, Stanley announced that it would be changing job classifications at the facilities to match the classifications specified in its contract, resulting in a pay decrease of about 12 percent which prompted Sen. Bernie Sanders from Vermont to call on the Labor Department to investigate what he charged was a violation of the Service Contract Act.

== Investigation ==
In March 2008, the U.S. Department of State, which is responsible for issuing U.S. passports, stated that two employees of a Stanley Associates subcontractor had been fired for improperly accessing the passport application file of (then) presidential candidate Barack Obama. The State Department held a press conference on March 21, 2008 regarding the breach. In each case, Stanley took immediate disciplinary action and employees were terminated the day the unauthorized search occurred. Stanley also stated its general policy and practice to cooperate fully with any potential Government investigation.

Additional information on Stanley's involvement in the breach has yet to be disclosed to the public, but an internal state department review suggested that the access may have been more widespread than initially reported.

== Corporate mergers ==
In February 2006, Stanley acquired Morgan Research Corporation. At the time of acquisition, MORGAN had annual revenues of approximately $70 million and 480 employees in Alabama, Florida, Oklahoma, and Texas, supporting customers including the U.S. Army Aviation and Missile Command (AMCOM), U.S. Army PEO STRI (Program Executive Officer for Simulation, Training, & Instrumentation), and NASA.

On June 10, 2008, Stanley announced that it was acquiring Oberon Associates, a fellow defense contractor also based out of Virginia. In April 2007, Stanley acquired Lawton, Okla.-based Techrizon LLC, a provider of software, training, simulation and information security solutions.

On May 7, 2010, CGI Group Inc., a provider of information technology and business processing services, announced that they had entered into a definitive merger agreement to acquire Stanley. The merger was finalized in August 2010.

== Corporate recognition ==
Washington Technology listed Stanley at the 50th position in its 2007 list of the top 100 U.S. federal government prime contractors. In the 2008 listing, Stanley rose to the 48th position. In 2009, Stanley rose to the 45th position.

Fortune Magazine included Stanley in its 2007, 2008, and 2009 lists of the "100 Best Companies to Work For". The methodology that Fortune Magazine follows in determining the companies listed in the ranking includes an independent survey of a random sampling of company employees.

Stanley was ranked in the 10th position in the large companies category on the 2009 Best Places to Work in Oklahoma.

The 2009 Washington Business Journal Best Places to Work ranked Stanley in the 17th position in the large companies category.
