= USCGC Dauntless =

United States Coast Guard cutter

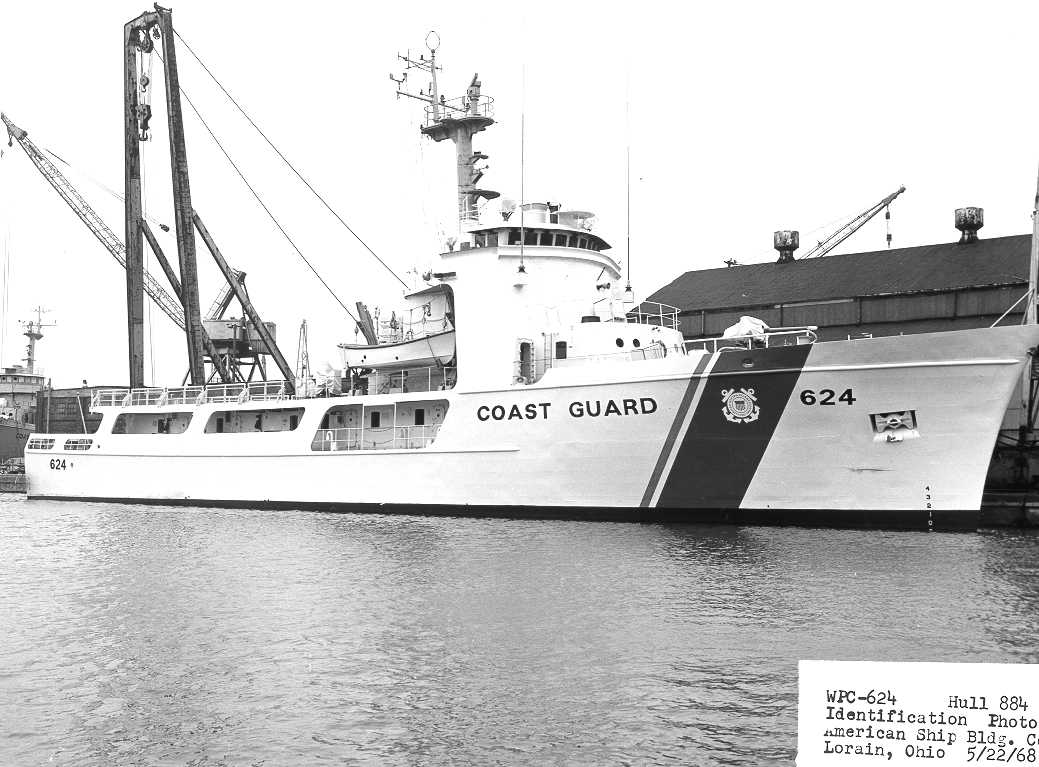
- USCGC Dauntless (WMEC-624) in 1968

History

United States
- Name: Dauntless
- Namesake: Dauntless
- Builder: American Ship Building Company
- Laid down: 15 May 1965
- Launched: 21 October 1967
- Commissioned: 10 June 1968
- Home port: Pensacola
- Identification: MMSI number: 367295000; Callsign: NDTS; Pennant number: WMEC-624
- Motto: Sin Miedo; (Without Fear)
- Status: In commission Special Status

General characteristics
- Displacement: 759 tons
- Length: 210 ft 6 in (64.16 m)
- Beam: 34 ft (10 m)
- Draft: 10 ft 6 in (3.20 m) max
- Propulsion: 2 x Cooper-Bessemer Corporation FVBM-12 turbocharged diesel engines (1968); 2 x Alco diesels (1987)
- Speed: max 18 knots; 2,700 mile range (1968)
- Range: cruise 14 knots; 6,100 mile range (1968)
- Complement: 12 officers, 63 enlisted (1990)
- Sensors & processing systems: 2 x AN/SPS-64 (1987)
- Armament: 1 × Mk 38 25mm machine gun; 2 × M2HB .50 caliber machine gun (1987)
- Aviation facilities: Helipad

USCGC Dauntless (WMEC-624) is a United States Coast Guard medium endurance cutter, commissioned in 1968.

She is the first cutter in Coast Guard history to hold this name. Like all ships in the Reliance class of 210-foot medium-endurance cutters, Dauntless is named for an aspirational trait, in this case meaning to "persevere fearlessly." This trait is further reflected in the ship's motto Sin Miedo which, in Spanish, means "Without Fear."

== Construction and career ==
Dauntless was laid down on May 15, 1967 and launched on October 21, 1967 by the American Ship Building Company of Lorain, Ohio. She was commissioned on June 10, 1968. She is the tenth of the sixteen Reliance-class cutters.

Dauntless was designed for search-and-rescue work. At launch, she had a small, high superstructure with 360-degree visibility and a correspondingly large helicopter pad aft without a hanger. To improve the view from the bridge and to ease helicopter operations, her engine exhaust was not routed through a stack but out through the transom. In practice, waves washing into the exhaust openings in heavy weather proved troublesome. The exhaust through the transom was replaced by a conventional stack during Dauntless's Mid-life Maintenance Availability in 1993. Afterwards the ship had a larger superstructure and a smaller helicopter pad. Her hull is welded steel and her superstructure aluminum, as is usual with contemporary warships.

At launch, Dauntless's main armament was an open-mount Mark 22 3-inch/50 caliber gun on the foredeck. During the Mid-life Maintenance Availability this gun was replaced by a 25-mm/87 cal Bushmaster Mark 38 and her Mark 22 gun was put on display onboard the USS Lexington Museum. Dauntless is also armed with two M2HB .50 caliber machine guns. Her design included space and weight reservations for Hedgehog anti-submarine mortars and later Mark 32 anti-submarine torpedoes but these were never actually installed.

After her commissioning, Dauntless was homeported in Miami, Florida for 25 years, where she earned a reputation as one of the nation's premier "drug busters." Dauntless became the second cutter in history (after USCGC Steadfast) to seize one million pounds of marijuana, an accomplishment signified by a large gold marijuana leaf painted on her superstructure. She became the first cutter to seize one ton of marijuana in a single bust when her crew boarded the fishing boat Big L on March 8, 9173. During her Coast Guard career, Dauntless has over 85 illegal narcotics "busts" to her credit, more than any other cutter.

She has also played a leading role in search and rescue (SAR) operations. During the mass Cuban exodus (see Mariel boatlift) between April 23 and May 13, 1980, over 25 vessels were towed to safety, eight persons adrift at sea were rescued, and 55 SAR cases were conducted.

President Ronald Reagan visited the cutter on November 17, 1982 and awarded her the Coast Guard Unit Commendation. It was the first time in 19 years that a President visited a Coast Guard cutter.

The ship's most-publicized case occurred during January 1986, when Dauntless was second (after USCGC Point Roberts) to arrive and served as on-scene commander (until relieved by USCGC Dallas) for the response to the Space Shuttle Challenger disaster.

In June 1993, she was decommissioned and entered Major Maintenance Availability (MMA) at the Coast Guard Yard in Curtis Bay, Maryland. After 18 months and at a total cost of $21 million, the ship was completely overhauled from stem to stern. The major renovations included the addition of an engine exhaust stack aft of the pilot house, a complete powerplant overhaul, installation of new navigation and communications systems, and extensive habitability improvements. After MMA, Dauntless sailed to her new homeport of Galveston, Texas in March 1995. She was also drydocked for overhaul for ten months in 2009 at the Coast Guard Yard and for six months in 2022 at the Brooklyn Navy Yard.

On November 24, 1995, Dauntless rescued 578 migrants from a grossly overloaded 75-foot coastal freighter, the largest number of migrants rescued from a single vessel in Coast Guard history.

After relocating to Galveston, Dauntless continued performing her primary missions of law enforcement, alien migrant interdiction operations, protection of marine resources, SAR, and later homeland defense in the Gulf of Mexico. Operational highlights included the four "drug busts" resulting in over 3,000 pounds of illegal drugs seized; and the September 2001 rescue of a young commercial mariner from Louisiana who had fallen overboard from the vessel on which he was working; he was successfully located and returned to his ship. After the events of September 11, 2001, Dauntless conducted several patrols dedicated to enhancing port security in the Gulf of Mexico.

In July 2018, Dauntless arrived at her newly assigned homeport of Pensacola, Florida.

At a June 21, 2024 Naval Air Station Pensacola ceremony celebrating her 56 years of service, Dauntless was removed from active duty and placed in commission, special status—an inactive shipyard condition. Her crew departed to other duty stations to help address the Coast Guard's shortage of enlisted personnel.

== Awards ==
The cutter's awards include the Coast Guard Unit Commendation (2), the Coast Guard Meritorious Unit Commendation (5), the Coast Guard Bicentennial Unit Commendation, the Coast Guard "E" ribbon (7), the National Defense Service Medal (3), and the Humanitarian Service Medal (3).

== In fiction ==
Dauntless has appeared in two motion pictures: The Island, in which (portraying the fictional USCGC New Hope) she was boarded and seized by Caribbean pirates, and in the James Bond film Licence to Kill

In the 2016 novel Goliath by Shawn Corridan and Gary Waid, Dauntless along with Alex Haley are the two Coast Guard cutters that respond to the fire aboard and subsequent stranding of a Russian ULCC.

== Gallery ==
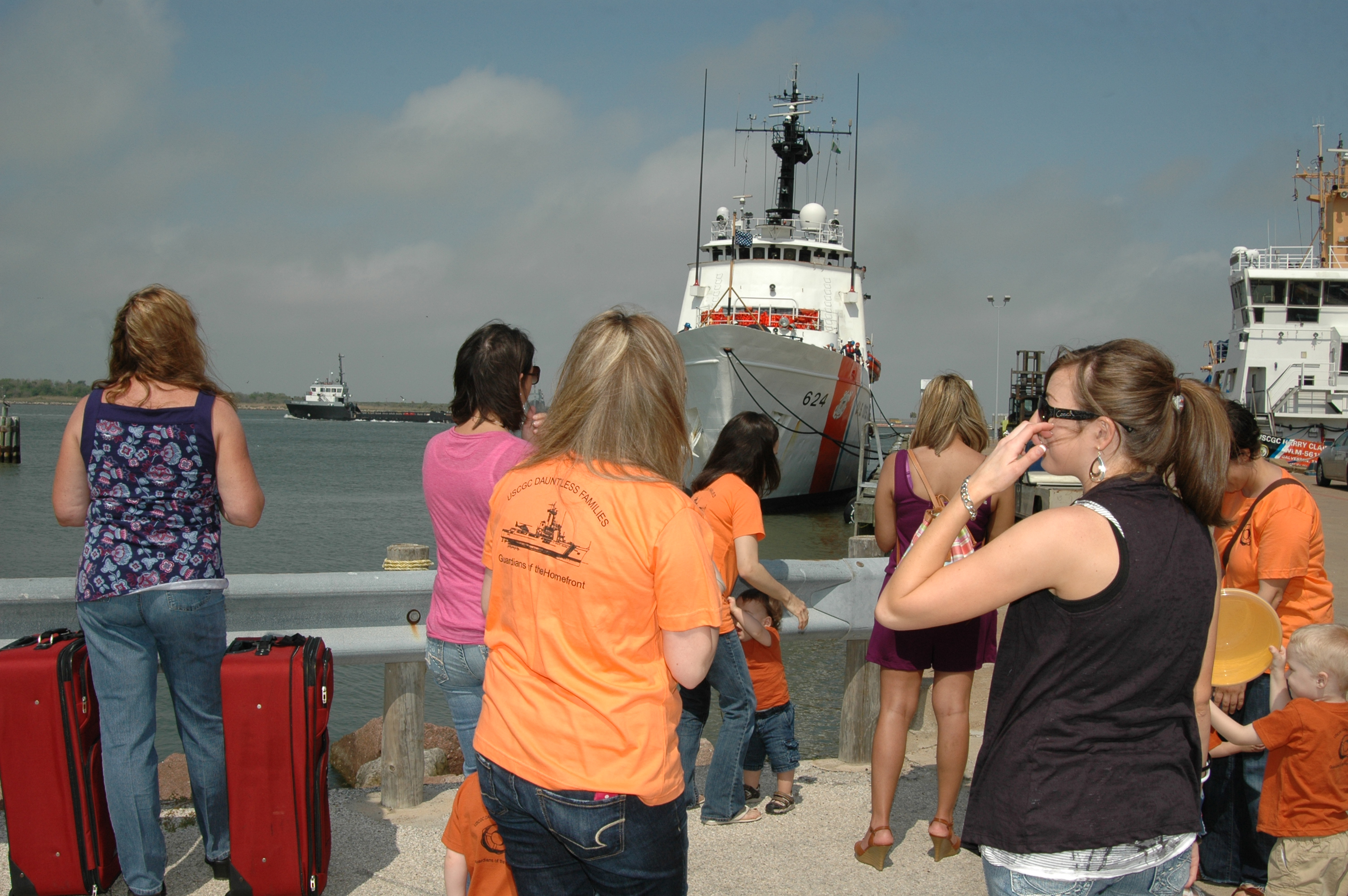
USCGC Dauntless returning to port in December 2009.

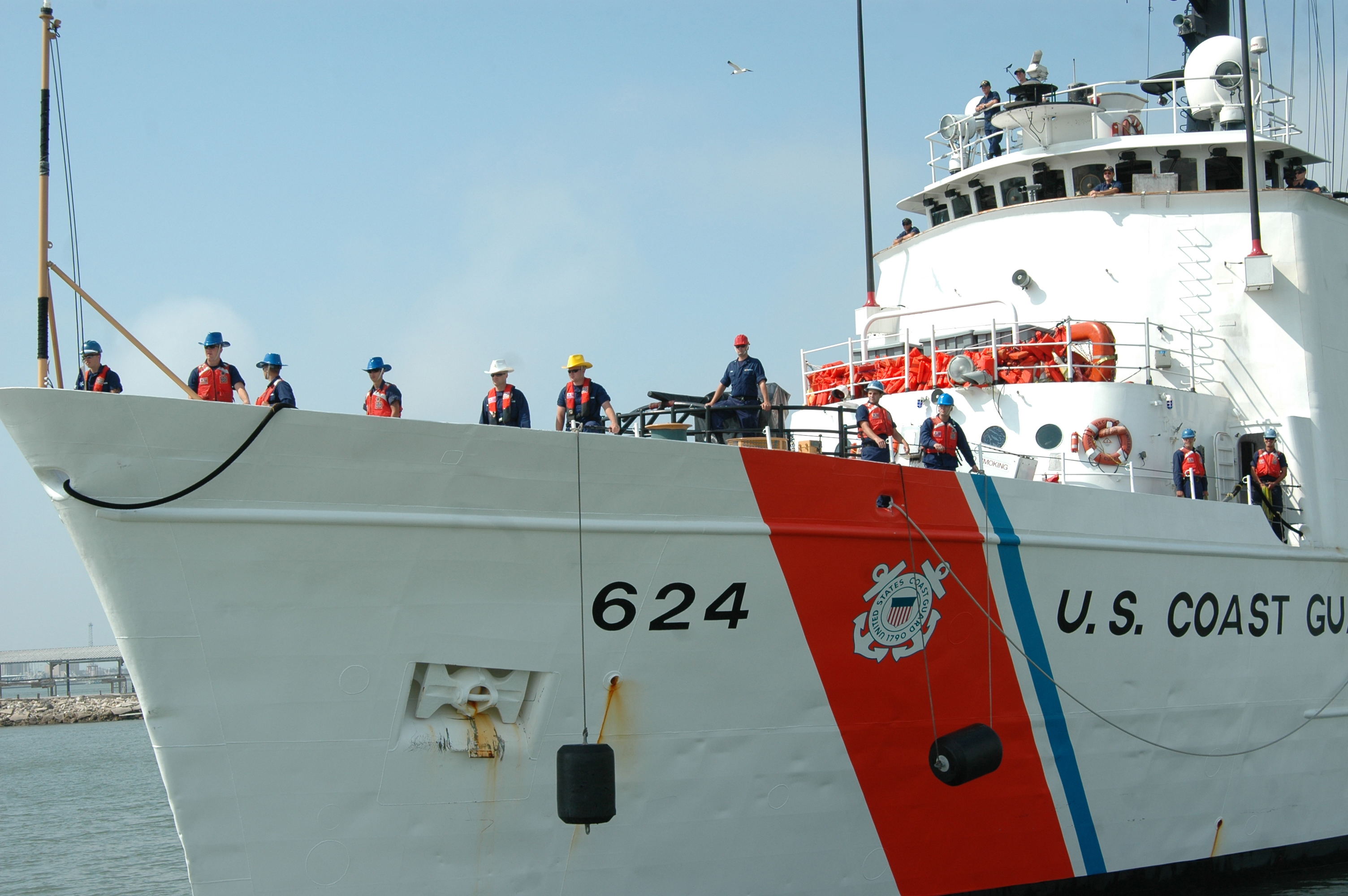
USCGC Dauntless returning to port in December 2009.

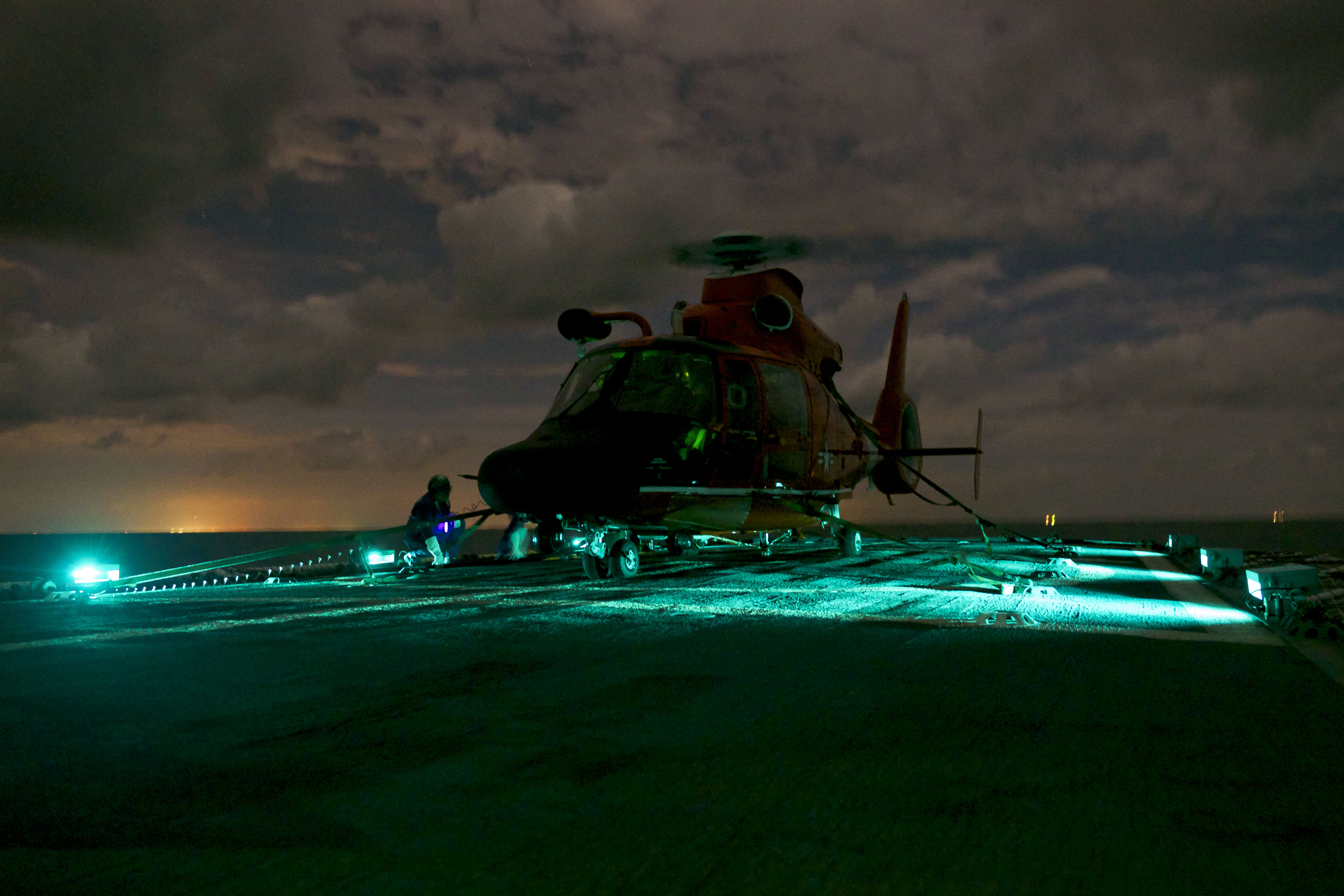
USCGC Dauntless in the Gulf of Mexico on 14 November 2013.

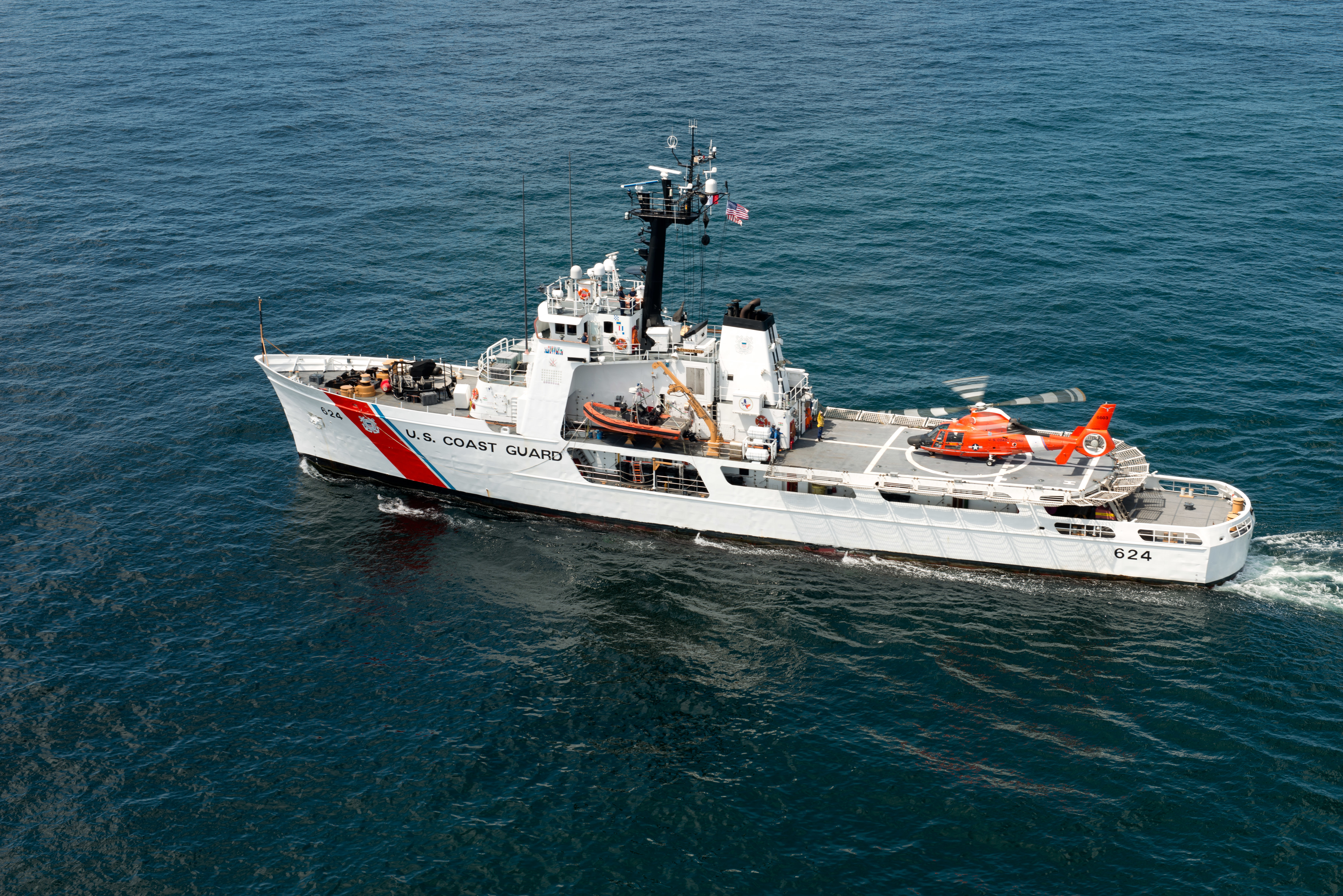
USCGC Dauntless in the Gulf of Mexico on 10 June 2016.
