= Wooden Ships and Iron Men =

1974 board wargame set in the Age of Sail

- Cover of Avalon Hill 1st edition (1975)
- Designers: S. Craig Taylor
- Illustrators: Edward Moran
- Publishers: Battleline, Avalon Hill
- Publication: 1974; 52 years ago
- Players: 2 +
- Playing time: 60 minutes
- Age range: 12+

Wooden Ships and Iron Men is a naval board wargame simulating naval combat during the Age of Sail that was published by Battleline Publications in 1974, then revised and republished by Avalon Hill the following year.

== Name ==
The name comes from the phrase attributed to Austrian admiral Wilhelm von Tegetthoff about the battle of Lissa: "Wooden ships commanded by men with iron heads defeated iron ships commanded by men with wooden heads." By saying this, von Tegetthoff attempted to ascribe the defeat's responsibility to the inept Italian commands, in particular to Carlo Pellion di Persano.

== Description ==
Wooden Ships and Iron Men is a two-player game that simulates naval combat in the 18th and 19th centuries between individual ships as well as with larger fleet actions. The 1975 Avalon Hill edition of the game has 23 scenarios, including the Battles of The Saintes, the Nile, and Trafalgar, as well as smaller and lesser known actions. (Avalon Hill published a further nine scenarios in various issues of The General).

=== Components ===
The Avalon Hill 1975 edition of the game comes with:

- 22" x 28" mounted hex grid map board (representing ocean) in two single-fold pieces. (In the 1981 2nd edition, this became a single piece four-fold board.)
- rule book
- 100 die-cut counters
- log sheets for plotting movement, forming boarding parties and tracking damage
- reference sheet
- six-sided die

=== Gameplay ===
The rules are divided into a Basic game and an Advanced game. There are also optional rules that can be added in whole or in part to the Advanced game. In addition to movement and combat, the rules cover towing damaged vessels, fields of fire restricted by fallen masts, running aground, determining depth of waters by means of a lead line, and exploding or sinking ships.

=== Combat ===
Damage can be inflicted on a ship either by the use of cannon fire, or by sending a boarding party to capture the ship.

=== Victory conditions ===
All scenarios use an identical method of calculating victory points by comparing the strengths of captured and destroyed vessels.

== Publication history ==
In 1974, Battleline Publications released the first edition of Wooden Ships and Iron Men with what would become the Basic rules. The following year, Avalon Hill acquired the rights to the game and S. Craig Taylor revised the game, adding Advanced as well as optional rules. Game development was by Mick Uhl, and the revised game was published in 1975. Avalon Hill released a second edition with updated rules in 1981.

In 1987, Avalon Hill published an identically titled video game for the Commodore 64 that was based on the board game.

Nine years later, Avalon Hill released a second Wooden Ships and Iron Men video game, this one for PC computers.

== Reception ==
In a 1976 poll conducted by wargame publisher Simulations Publications Inc. (SPI) to find the most popular wargame in the United States, Wooden Ships and Iron Men was Avalon Hill's most popular game, placing 7th out of 202 games. In a similar 1976 poll conducted by Avalon Hill, but only of their own games, Wooden Ships and Iron Men placed first out of 25 games.

In his 1977 book The Comprehensive Guide to Board Wargaming, Nicholas Palmer called the game "Playable and yet highly realistic; it simulates numerous naval battles at a detailed tactical level, with different types of sail, various forms of ammunition, and an immense range of different ships." Palmer noted that "wind plays a crucial role, and the reasons for the historical formations become apparent." He did note that many scenarios were unbalanced "but experienced players design their own groups from a point system." He concluded, "Complex but accurate."

In Issue 29 of Phoenix, Doug Davies admired the rules that emphasized the importance of wind direction. However, he noted that while differences in combat ability between various ships were reflected in the rules, no such difference in the navigation abilities of the crews were differentiated. He also noted that visibility in every scenario except one night action is assumed to be unlimited, which he thought "could be deemed to be unrealistic", given the amount of gunpowder smoke that drifted between the ships. He also felt that some unrealistic maneuvers could be made by canny players taking advantage of the map's hex grid. Davies also felt that too many of the scenarios involved actions that were historically unbalanced, and questioned why more closely balanced actions from history were not chosen, such as several historical and hard-fought naval battles during the American War of Independence. Despite these quibbles, Davies was quite taken with this game, and concluded "the best method of trying to appreciate the subtleties of the 'Nelson touch' is by playing the excellent Wooden Ships and Iron Men."

In Issue 19 of Wargamer, Andy Bagley called this game "arguably the most popular tactical naval game, a game whose simple mechanics belie the complexity and subtlety of skills needed by the would-be Admiral."

In the 1980 book The Complete Book of Wargames, Jon Freeman wrote, "two turns of this game speak volumes about the significance of wind direction for sailing ships-of-the-line [...] Purely for the feel of being there, this game is unsurpassed."

In Issue 4 of Command, Dennis Agosta called the game "easy to learn, easy to play, well-balanced and extremely exciting to play." His only complaint was that the game box did not include a tray to hold counters.

In The Guide to Simulations/Games for Education and Training, Martin Campion compared this game to its rival, Frigate (SPI, 1974), in terms of use in the classroom and noted, "They deal with the same subject, but Wooden Ships does it in much more detail. [Frigate] is best used for fleet actions with two to four players. [Wooden Ships] is best used in single ship actions with two players or fleet actions with a lot of players to do the bookwork."

== Reviews ==
- Jeux & Stratégie #10

== Awards ==
At the 1997 Origins Awards, the 1996 video game for PC computers won Best Military or Strategy Computer Game of 1996.

== Other recognition ==
Copies of both the board wargame (object ID 112.6288) and the videogame (object ID 112.6158) Wooden Ships and Iron Men are held in the collection of the Strong National Museum of Play.
