= Circus Maximus (game) =

Board game

- Cover art by Chris White and Michael Carroll (Avalon Hill edition)
- Designers: Michael Matheny; Don Greenwood
- Illustrators: Cathy Chastain (counter art)
- Publishers: Battleline Publications; Avalon Hill
- Publication: 1979; 47 years ago
- Genres: Racing game
- Players: 2-10
- Playing time: 120 minutes
- Age range: 12+

Circus Maximus is a chariot racing board game that was originally published by Battleline Publications in 1979, but is better known for the 1980 Avalon Hill edition. The game has become very popular at gaming conventions in an oversized form, with 10-foot (3.0 m)-long boards and baseball-sized chariots.

== Description ==
Circus Maximus is a chariot racing board game recommended for eight players. Players choose teams of horses and drivers, and race their custom chariots around an oval track. Charioteers are encouraged to physically attack their opponents with whips, force opposing chariots into walls, and hamstring opponents' horses with wheel-mounted blades.

=== Customization ===
Each player chooses a color for their team and is given the corresponding chariot team consisting of a chariot, a team of four horses, and a driver, all of which start with zero points — the lowest quality. The player has a pool of four points, and can assign up to two points to each part of the chariot team.

- Assigning points to the chariot increases its weight and its ability to damage other chariots
- Assigning points to speed increases the horses' speed
- Assigning points to Endurance increases the horses' individual hit points
- Assigning points to the driver increases their horse-handling and combat abilities and their hit points.

=== The race ===
All teams are randomly assigned a spot on the start line. Before the turn starts, players write down their speed for the turn. Turn order is then determined randomly by pulling colored chits from a cup. On their turn, a player must move their chariot the speed that was written down.

=== Movement ===
Moving straight ahead costs one movement point for each square. Moving to an outside lane also only costs one movement point per square. Moving to a more inward lane costs two movement points for each new lane entered.

Each lane in a corner has a posted "safe" speed. A driver entering a corner too fast must make a roll to see if they are successful. Failure can result in loss of stamina to the horses or even a chariot crash. A player can reduce their posted speed by braking, but this causes the horses to lose stamina. A player can also increase speed by whipping their horses, but this also reduces the horses' stamina. If an entire team's stamina is reduced to zero, the chariot comes to a stop and is out of the race.

=== Combat during the race ===
If a player's chariot draws adjacent to another, the player can choose to attack the other chariot with their chariot, attack the other driver with their driver's whip, or attack the horses with either a whip or their chariot. Drivers that received points in competency or chariots that received points to make them heavier are more likely to do damage.

- If a driver's hit points are reduced to zero, the driver dies and the team is out of the race.
- If a horse is reduced to zero hit points, that horse no longer contributes to the chariot's speed.
- If the chariot's hit points are reduced to zero, the chariot is destroyed.

=== Victory ===
Each race is three laps. The driver that crosses the finish line first wins the race.

=== Advanced rules ===
Optional rules include Wreck Location, Running Over Wrecks, Dragged Drivers, Runaway Teams, and Running for Cover.

=== Campaign game ===
A campaign is ten races long. Players are given a starting amount of money, and can increase that by winning races and by betting on race outcomes. A player does not have to bet on their own team. At the end of the campaign, it does not matter how many races a player has won; the player who has accumulated the most money is the winner. There are also rules for increasing point values of drivers and horses through experience, engaging in skullduggery against other teams, and recovering from injuries.

== Publication history ==
Circus Maximus, designed by Michael Matheny, was originally called Chariot Racing when it was published in 1979 by Battleline Publications, a subsidiary of Heritage Models. (Chariot Racing and a one-on-one combat game called Gladiator were sold together under the name Circus Maximus.) When Battleline was sold to Avalon Hill in October 1979, the new owners published the two components of Circus Maximus as two separate games. While Gladiator retained its original title, Chariot Racing was renamed Circus Maximus. Don Greenwood worked on the second edition.

In 1984, Avalon Hill released a video game for MS-DOS based on the rules of the board game.

== Reception ==
In the September 1979 edition of Dragon, Tim Kask was effusive in his praise of the original Chariot Racing, saying, "To put it simply, it is the best treatment of chariot racing that I have seen to date. The rules are ridiculously simple, as are the actual mechanics of the game. There are campaign rules that allow you to set up entire racing seasons; there are rules for accruing experience by continued racing and high placement. There are even provisions for skullduggery and sabotage. The game itself moves very fast and seldom gets boring. In the greatest movie traditions, you can outfit your cart with scythe blades and chop up your opponent’s wheels, or flog his horses to spook them or lash enemy drivers. Shades of great sport, even if your chariot tips over and drags your driver to his doom under the thundering hooves of the other teams."

In Issue 23 of Games, R. Wayne Schmiltberger noted that underhanded tactics were necessary, writing, "skullduggery affects the outcome nearly as much as driving skill." Schmiltberger noted "The lengthy rules should not be taken as a sign of complexity; many of them pertain only to the campaign version which requires a series of races and introduces the element of betting." He concluded, "All in all, Circvs Maximvs is a pleasant simulation. And a lot safer than the real thing."

In 2007, almost 30 years after its original publication, Circus Maximus was chosen for the book Hobby Games: The 100 Best. Writer and game designer Stan! explained its inclusion: "There are a lot of very good racing games out there, set against a wide variety of interesting backdrops, everything from cavemen riding dinosaurs through Formula One racers on real-world tracks and on to spaceships hurtling through interstellar space. So what is it that makes Circus Maximus stand out as, far and away, my favorite of the bunch? Is it the Imperial Roman setting? The elegant mechanics? The way the game encourages players to work together while still competing? I can't really say that it's any of those things, but rather that it's all of those things together."

Circus Maximus was the initial inspiration behind the 2014 chariot racing video game Qvadriga.

== Awards ==
At the 1980 Charles S. Roberts Awards, Circus Maximus was a finalist in the category "Best Pre-Twentieth Century Game".

== Other recognition ==
A copy of Circus Maximus is held in the collection of the Canadian Museum of History. (Item number 2009.71.1376.2)
