= S. Craig Taylor =

American game designer

- Born: S. Craig Taylor Jr. March 1946
- Died: June 2012
- Occupation: Game designer
- Years active: 1962–?

S. Craig Taylor Jr. was an American game designer who has worked primarily on board games and wargames.

== Career ==
S. Craig Taylor Jr. first had a playtest credit on the 1962 version of Avalon Hill's version of Bismarck. Stephen Peek and Craig Taylor worked for Battleline Publications, and that wargame company later merged into Heritage USA in an attempt to grow more rapidly; that effort did not succeed so Peek and Taylor left to establish the new wargame company Yaquinto Publications. Taylor has been a playtester, designer, developer, researcher, rules writer, and producer for well over 100 board, miniature, card, and computer games for such publishers Battleline, Yaquinto, Avalon Hill, Microprose, Imagic, SouthPeak Games, TalonSoft, Lost Battalion Games, and Breakaway Games. Taylor's credits include such designs as Wooden Ships and Iron Men, Air Force, Flattop, Battle, Wings, Gettysburg: Smithsonian Edition, Sergeants, Battlegroup, and Gettysburg: Leading the Killer Angels.
