= Armageddon: Tactical Combat, 3000-500 BC =

Board wargame

Cover of the flat-pack version, 1972

Armageddon: Tactical Combat, 3000-500 BC is a board wargame first published by Simulations Publications Inc. (SPI) in 1972 in Strategy & Tactics, then released as a stand-alone game, then reimplemented as Chariot: Tactical Warfare in the "Biblical" Age, 3000-500 BC.

== Description ==
Armageddon is a tactical board wargame for two players that simulates historic battles in the Fertile Crescent during the Bronze and Iron Ages, with a particular focus on chariots.

=== Components ===
The stand-alone game consists of:

- "flat-pack" clear plastic box with integrated counter tray
- rulebook
- 255 die-cut counters representing:
  - 9 types of combat units (infantry, spearmen, cavalry, skirmishers, and others)
  - transportation units (chariots)
  - leader units
- paper hex grid map 11" x 23"
- one six-sided die

=== Turn phases ===
Each player, in turn, is given a fire phase for missile weapons, movement phase, and combat phase for melee between adjacent units.

=== Movement ===
Each unit has a movement rate, and can use that to move forward into any one of the three hexes to the front of the unit at a cost of 1 movement point per hex. (Some terrain enacts movement penalties.) If a player wishes to turn the unit to a different facing, the unit can turn 60 degrees at a cost of 1 movement point. There is no zone of control rule, so units can freely by-pass enemy units without having to stop to engage them.

=== Stacking ===
During a player's turn, there is no stacking limit per hex, but at the end of the player's turn, there can be no more than three units per hex.

=== Combat ===
Units all have two melee combat strengths: "front" (the three hexes in front of the unit); and "flank" (the three hexes behind the unit.) The Combat Results Table lists five possible results against the defending unit: no effect, disruption, retreat, half-elimination, or total elimination. Regardless of the result, melee combat has no effect on the attacking unit. Chariots (transportation units) do not have offensive combat value but do improve combat units.

=== Scenarios ===
Fourteen scenarios are included with the game, one a generic scenario designed to teach players the rules, and thirteen simulating historic battles where chariots played a major role:

- Generic introductory scenario
- The Delta (1675 BC)
- Babylon (1595 BC)
- Megiddo (1469 BC)
- Kadesh (1294 BC)
- Sinai (c. 1225 BC)
- Qarqar (854 BC)
- Tabal (706 BC)
- Charchemish (608 BC)
- Thymbra (546 BC)
- Bubastis (c. 3000 BC)
- Armageddon (609 BC)
- Lake Regillus (c. 496 BC)
- The Aequi (458 BC)

Of these, ten are "balanced" scenarios where either side has a reasonable chance of winning; and three are unbalanced simulations demonstrating overwhelming historical victories, and labelled by reviewer Martin Campion as "foregone conclusions".

== Publication history ==
Armageddon was designed by John Young and published as a pull-out game in the September 1972 issue of Strategy & Tactics (#34). It was then released as a stand-alone game.

In 1975, SPI re-implemented Armageddon as Chariot: Tactical Warfare in the Biblical Age, 3000-500 B.C., one of five Bronze Age, Iron Age, medieval and Renaissance wargames in the PRESTAGS series (Pre-Seventeenth Century Tactical Game System). The other games in the series are Spartan, Legion, Viking, and Yeoman.

== Reception ==
In Moves #7, Martin Campion noted that the rules for Armageddon are based on previous SPI games Phalanx and Centurion, but with several changes. Campion liked the simple terrain map, which he said "is pleasantly free of the veritable jungle of terrain features which hurts Phalanx and Centurion." Campion also liked some of the rule changes that had been made that "together with a more generous combat results table, speeds up the combat considerably." He didn't like the elimination of a victory point system, which meant that "Now all armies will fight to the last man, if so commanded." Despite this, he concluded that "on the whole, the new rules represent improvement."

In the April 1976 issue of Strategy & Tactics (#55), Jerrold Thomas gave an in-depth examination of the entire PRESTAGS series, and concluded all the games "have tremendous variety and interest; literally something for everyone. They can also add vividness to the reading of history, which can become suddenly more comprensible when you can actually see just what the opponents had to work with, and what they did with it."

In the first issue of Phoenix, John Norris thought the game considerably less complex than other wargames covering this historic period, but noted that "The level of complexity can be varied by the use of optional rules, which can raise the game from a simple slogging match to a fairly good simulation of the capabilities of the armies involved." Norris thought the weakest part of the rules was "the simulation of morale; this is only done through an optional Panic Level."

== Other reviews ==
- Fire & Movement #22, #71
- The Wargamer Vol.1 #5
- JagdPanther #15
- Adventure Gaming Vol. 2 #1
- Paper Wars #63
