= Renaissance of Infantry =

1970 board wargame

- Strategy & Tactics #22, which included Renaissance of Infantry as a pull-out game
- Designers: Albert A. Nofi
- Illustrators: Redmond A. Simonsen
- Publishers: Simulations Publications Inc.
- Publication: 1970
- Genres: Medieval

Renaissance of Infantry, subtitled "Tactical Warfare, 1250 A.D.–1550 A.D.", is a board wargame published by Simulations Publications in 1970 that simulates famous medieval battles.

== Description ==
Renaissance of Infantry is a wargame that sets out to show the increasing predominance of infantry over cavalry in the Middle Ages. The game simulates twenty famous battles such as Bannockburn, Crecy, Bicocca, and Agincourt.

=== Components ===
The game includes

- 500 counters (unmounted in the magazine edition, die-cut cardboard in the boxed edition)
- 22" x 28" paper hex grid map scaled at 100 m (109 yd) per hex
- sheet of rules

== Publication history ==
Renaissance of Infantry, designed by Albert A. Nofi with graphics and art by Redmond A. Simonsen, was first published by SPI as Tactical Game 14 (Tac 14), a pull-out game in Issue 22 of Strategy & Tactics (September 1970). The game, retitled Renaissance of Infantry, was also released as a boxed set and in a flat-pack tray.

In 1975, SPI re-implemented Renaissance of Infantry as Yeoman: Tactical Warfare in the Renaissance Age, 1250-1550, one of five Bronze Age, Iron Age, medieval and Renaissance wargames in the PRESTAGS series (Pre-Seventeenth Century Tactical Game System). The other games in the series were Chariot, Spartan, Legion, and Viking.

== Reception ==
In Issue 11 of the UK magazine Puzzles & Games, Don Turnbull reviewed the original Tac 14 and commented, "Players have differing opinions on this game; certainly it isn't easy, and many of the rules are unfamiliar, being off the 'main line'." He did have some issues with the game itself, saying, "Some games can develop into sheer slogging matches, and the luck element is perhaps higher than one would expect." Despite this, he concluded, "for those interested in this particular period of warfare, an attractive experiment."

Turnbull reviewed the game again in Albion #23, this time the final version of Renaissance of Infantry published in Strategy & Tactics. Turnbull called it, "Fast, furious and bloody ... a most exciting and interesting game, and one which you should lose no time in getting and playing." In the following issue, Turnbull followed up by adding, "The rules are almost completely novel ... We rate this game as the best we have ever tested."

In the Special Issue #1 of Fire & Movement, Renaissance of Infantry was named one of "Our Editors' Top Ten" Wargames of All Time".

In his 1977 book The Comprehensive Guide to Board Wargaming, Nicholas Palmer reviewed Yeoman, the 1975 game that reimplemented Renaissance of Infantry, and commented, "Squares, foolhardy cavalry, longbowmen, trenches, cavalry traps, and artillery limbering appear, giving fair period 'feel'."

Renaissance of Infantry was chosen for inclusion in the 2007 book Hobby Games: The 100 Best. Game designer Joseph Miranda commented, "Renaissance of Infantry's rules freely state that if players do not like something in the game, they should change it. This was a revolutionary concept back in 1970, and it remains so today."

== Other reviews ==
- Albion #24
- Strategy & Tactics Guide to Conflict Simulation Games, Periodicals, and Publications in Print #2
- Fire & Movement #64 & #71
- International Wargamer Vol. 4, No. 5
