= PRESTAGS =

1976 Collection of board wargames

PRESTAGS ("Pre-Seventeenth Century Tactical Game System") is a collection of five board wargames published by Simulations Publications, Inc. (SPI) in 1975 that simulates battles from the Bronze Age to the Renaissance. The five games were originally published as individual games with their own set of rules before being collected into one box and their various rules revised to produce one common set of rules.

== Description ==
PRESTAGS is a collection of five two-player tactical board wargames in which one player controls one force such as Romans, Vikings, or Normans, and the other player controls the force that met them in battle. The five games were published individually before being gathered together and retitled:

1. Chariot (formerly Armageddon): Bronze Age, 3000 BCE to 500 BCE
2. Spartan (formerly Phalanx ): Iron Age, 500 BCE to 100 BCE
3. Legion (formerly Centurion): Roman Empire, 100 BC to 700 AD
4. Viking (formerly Dark Ages): Medieval Period, 700 CE to 1300 CE)
5. Yeoman (formerly Renaissance of Infantry), Renaissance, 1250 CE to 1550 CE

Each game has multiple scenarios covering various battles that occurred during that time period.

=== Gameplay ===
The game system used by all games of the PRESTAGS series is a simple "I Go, You Go" system of alternating turns where one player fires missiles (arrows, spears, etc.), moves and attacks, followed by the other player. More complexity can be added by using optional rules for panic, leadership, facing, melee and simultaneous movement.

In addition to the shared PRESTAGS rules, each game also has rules unique to the game's particular period. Vikings, for instance, includes the use of fransisca throwing axes, berserkers and longboats.

== Publication history ==
From 1970 to 1972, the new wargame company SPI published five games simulating battles in various periods of ancient history that were created by a variety of game designers. In 1975, John Young, who had designed two of the games, was tasked with creating a common set of rules for all five games, as well as special rules for each game that would differentiate it from the others. The new games were retitled and gathered together under the banner "Pre-Seventeenth Century Tactical Game System" (PRESTAGS). As the blurb on the back of the box stated, ""Because the strength values of the units were all derived from the same base, units from one game are entirely compatible with another." As British critic Nicky Palmer noted, "you could even have chariots charging longbowmen if you wish."

The five games were released individually in 1975, and all immediately moved into SPI's "Top Ten Bestseller List". Several months later, the five were re-released together as part of the PRESTAGS Master-Pack. This did not crack SPI's Top Ten.

== Reception ==
In the January 1976 edition of Airfix Magazine, Bruce Quarrie noted "these rules allow a wide degree of flexibility in approach to the game. It can be an absolutely basic and 'unrealistic' affair [...] or by addition of optional Panic, Facing and Melee rules, and a [simultaneous movement sequence], it reproduces quite accurately the true conditions of the time." He concluded, "In general [...] the result is as SPI intended, to satisfy both those who desire a simple format and those who can assimilate relatively complex restrictions."

In his 1977 book The Comprehensive Guide to Board Wargaming, Nicky Palmer noted, "All the games in the series emphasize tactics, and the maps are mostly nondescript, with great expanses of clear terrain and a few hills, rivers, and other features dotted about. The variation comes in the different unit types and the numerous scenarios in each game." Palmer thought that, in overview, "The function of the series, tactical clashes with a simple basic system, is well achieved." However, Palmer did point out that "the anonymous maps inhibit the usual wargames enjoyment of refighting a particular battle."

In the 1980 book The Complete Book of Wargames, game designer Jon Freeman called the PRESTAGS rules system "a marvelous, if colorless, way to introduce people to wargaming and the early historical periods." He was disappointed that "Neither the maps or counters have historical designations. [...] one battle has little to distinguish it from another." He also questioned how the historicity of any battle was maintained, since, "because of counter-mix limitations and the generalized nature of the system, many of the orders of battle for individual scenarios are warped or downright inaccurate." He concluded by giving the game system an Overall Evaluation of "Good", saying, "The system is clean, and most battles can be played in a short time. If you are not too concerned with the limitations of the system, the variety of scenarios makes each game a bargain."

In The Guide to Simulations/Games for Education and Training, Martin Campion commented, "The beauty of the system is its range and flexibility. As it stands, it is occasionally very convincing but mostly only moderately convincing in its simulation of the events of the battles." With regards to its use in the classroom, Campion noted, "It is a wide open system for amendments and for the inclusion of new battles. There are many opportunities for the use of multiple players on both side."

In a retrospective review in Issue 28 of Simulacrum, Daniel Broh-Kahn listed all of the various types of counters in the PRESTAGS Master-Pack, and included the combat and movement strength of each piece, their value, special foes, their strengths and weaknesses as well as some historical backgtround.
