= World War II: European Theater of Operations =

1973 board wargame

World War II: European Theater of Operations is the title of two related but dissimilar board wargames that simulate the European Theater of World War II. The first was published by Simulations Publications Inc. (SPI) in 1973, and the second by TSR in 1985 following its takeover of SPI.

== Publication history ==
In 1969, Jim Dunnigan formed Poultron Press — soon to be known as Simulations Publications — in order to save the faltering wargame magazine Strategy & Tactics, and to publish wargames. Dunnigan used the magazine to gather readers' feedback for future projects. At the time there were several board wargames on the market that simulated various parts of World War II such as Afrika Korps (Avalon Hill, 1964), and Anzio (Avalon Hill, 1968). In Issue 21 of Strategy & Tactics (March 1970), many readers asked if the piecemeal European campaign games could be combined into one game that simulated the entire European theater. After a delay due to other projects, Dunnigan responded by designing World War II: European Theater of Operations 1939–1945 with rules based on Barbarossa, a popular wargame he had previously designed.

In 1982, TSR unexpectedly took over SPI and made it their wargame publishing subsidiary. TSR reissued several of SPI's more popular games such as Blue & Gray without revision. In the case of World War II, TSR game designer Jeff Ealy decided that the game needed a complete redesign, and discarded all of Dunnigan's rules. Ealy's revision, published in 1985, was based on very large wargames with economic elements by John Prados such as Rise and Decline of the Third Reich (Avalon Hill, 1974) and Von Manstein: Battles for the Ukraine (Rand Game Associates, 1975). The result, although identically titled, was a much larger and more complex game than its predecessor.

In 1990, TSR published a revised and expanded second edition, but identified by the old SPI marque rather than the TSR trademark. The following year, TSR published a companion wargame World War II: Pacific Theater of Operations that could be combined with European Theater of Operations to create a grand strategic game of the entire war.

Further revised and expanded editions were published by Decision Games: World War II: Advanced European Theatre of Operations (2001), World War II: Advanced Pacific Theatre of Operations (2009) as well as an expansion kit World War II: Advanced European Theatre of Operations: Africa Orientale Italiana (2009), covering Mussolini's invasion of Abyssinia in 1935 and the British reconquest in 1941.

SPI edition, 1973

== SPI edition, 1973 ==
The SPI edition is a two-player game of Allies versus Axis forces, although provision has been made for a three-player game where the third player controls the Soviet forces. The game has less than 400 counters, a 12-page rulebook and a single 22" x 28" hex grid map covering all of Europe and the Middle East.

=== Gameplay ===
The SPI edition uses a simple alternating turn system, where the German player has the following phases:

- Movement
- Attack
- Mechanized Movement: All mechanized units that did not move in first Movement phase can move
- Rail and Naval Movement

This is followed by administrative phases for reinforcements and partisan creation.

The Allied player then has the same phases, with the addition of Lend-Lease calculations for Russian reinforcements.

The end of the Allied player's turn completes one Game Turn, which represents one season (3 months) of the war.

=== Movement ===
All units can move five hexes per turn. However, if a unit is in one of the "weather zones" marked on the map, the seasons have an effect on maximum movement:

- Summer: 5 hexes
- Fall: 4 hexes
- Winter: 3 hexes
- Spring: 2 hexes

Units travelling by train triple their usual movement regardless of the season.

==== Naval transport ====
- The United Kingdom and United States both have naval transport that automatically arrives every turn. Each transport unit can move any Allied unit to any friendly territory.
- France has one transport unit that arrives in Marseilles each turn, and can move one French unit to any French possession.
- Germany has one transport unit in the Baltic and one in the Mediterranean each turn, and each can move one unit to an Axis-controlled port.
- Italy has one naval transport in the Mediterranean each turn, and can move one unit to an Axis-controlled port.

==== Amphibious transport ====
- The Allies receive amphibious transports automatically in 1942, 1943 and 1944. (The units are sent to the Pacific Theater in 1945.)
- The Germans must build amphibious transports, using four replacement factors to build each one. They cannot be used tin the Mediterranean, and can be converted to naval transports after being used in an amphibious role.

=== Air Power ===
Air power for the US, the UK and Germany is abstractly represented: when a naval transport passes within two hexes of an enemy unit, a die is rolled. If the result is a 6, the naval transport must return to its starting hex.

During an amphibious invasion, the area must be clear of two-hex enemy air zones; if not, then the air powers of the invader and defender must contest the air space.

=== Scenarios ===
The SPI edition comes with three scenarios which all run from the scenario's starting date until mid-1945:

- 1 September 1939 (Invasion of Poland): In order to maintain historical accuracy, Poland is divided with a demarcation line. Both Germany and the Soviet Union are non-aggressive to each other, and either or both can invade Poland, but if either crosses the demarcation line, they will be at war with the other. On the Western Front, Britain and France cannot attack Germany until they have been attacked.
- 10 May 1940 (Fall of France): The Germans are given an extra movement of their mechanized units to simulate the blitzkrieg assault.
- 22 June 1941 (Operation Barbarossa): During the first winter, Soviet forces attack with double their usual factor. Finland does not enter the war with the Soviet Union unless attacked.

In all scenarios, the United States always enters the war in 1942, even if the UK has been eliminated.

=== Other rules ===
There are many rules dealing with unique situations in each country that further complicate the game.

=== Reception ===
In Issue 12 of Moves, Christopher J. Allen called World War II "a hell of a good game" but warned that "it is more complex than this article might lead one to believe.. There are many secondary rules ... which are vital to the play of the game." Allen also pointed out that the game was unbalanced in favor of the Allies, stating, "Given two equal players, the Axis will almost always lose. He can win, but only if he makes no mistakes and has a bit of luck to boot." Allen noted that this imbalance did not occur in the three-player version of the game, saying "in the three-player game, anything can happen." Allen concluded, "Playing World War II is like jumping into cold water — it takes a little getting used to, but then you love it."

In his 1977 book The Comprehensive Guide to Board Wargaming, Nicky Palmer noted that this was a natural rival to Avalon Hill's Third Reich wargame, but commented "the total effect is a little simpler than [Third Reich], with a correspondingly narrower scope — thus the production system which is central to Third Reich is absent here."

In The Playboy Winner's Guide to Board Games, John Jackson noted that the two-player game was unbalanced, writing, "if only two play, Germany can pretty much run rampant over Europe as long as it does not violate Russian neutrality (which would allow the Allied player to bring in Russian forces on his side.)" Jackson noted that in a three-player game, "Russia's only feasible option is to attack Germany sooner or later—an act which, if properly timed, should be enough to steal the game victory from the Third Reich."

In The Guide to Simulations/Games for Education and Training, Martin Campion commented that the SPI edition "shows a great deal about the strategic options in World War II. It also clearly shows how the German invasion of Russia closed off most of those options for Hitler and became the dominating factor in the war." Campion, a history professor, believed the game "should be useful in a class because its complexity can be broken into many parts and parcelled out to the class members." However, he noted the need for the teacher to act as an impartial referee since "Some of the rules are ambiguous and others too rigid ... The teacher should improvise to keep the game on a realistic track."

Steve List did not like this game, commenting that "The great defect of this game was that it set up a Germany versus the world situation, where victory was determined by the survival or dismemberment of Germany." List found that "On the whole, it was not well done, and the very good ideas it does contain are stifled by some asinine rules and irritating implicit assumptions." List concluded by giving the game a grade of only "D+", saying, "for bad game aficionados, this one is a real treasure."

TSR edition, 1985

== TSR edition, 1985 ==
The TSR edition has a completely new set of rules in a 32-page rulebook, 800 counters and two large 22" x 32" maps, making it much larger and more complex than the SPI version.

=== Gameplay ===
Each game turn represents one month. At the start of each new three-month season (winter, spring, summer and fall) a special Seasonal Turn takes place in which players collect income from industry and must pre-pay for offensives that they have planned for the season. Payment for various items vary from country to country. For example, tanks are relatively inexpensive for Germany but naval ships are very expensive.

Then for each monthly Game Turn, the Axis player has the following phases, each of which is divided into multiple segments:

- Weather
- Strategic Warfare
- Naval and Air Phase
- Offensive Phase, subdivided into regular combat, breakthroughs, and exploitation attacks
- Movement Phase
- End Phase

The Allied player then has the same opportunity, completing the monthly Game Turn.

Units counters have a full-strength side, with half strength statistics printed on the back. Using "step reduction" rules, each unit is flipped over to the half-strength side after taking damage, and is eliminated on a second hit.

Leaders and headquarters, which have their own counters, play an important part in offensives.

=== Scenarios ===
The TSR edition offers six scenarios:

1. "Case White": The German invasion of Poland, September 1939. A short solo scenario designed to teach a player the basic game system.
2. "Blitzkrieg!" (short): The Fall of France, starts Spring 1940, ends at conclusion of September 1940.
3. "Blitzkrieg!" (long): Starts Spring 1940, ends June 1945
4. "Poised for the Onslaught" (short): The invasion of Russia, starts June 1941, ends at the conclusion of the December 1941 turn.
5. "Poised for the Onslaught" (long): Starts June 1941, ends June 1945.
6. "Campaign Game: Europe Ablaze": The entire war from September 1939 to June 1945.

=== Reception ===
Robert Norse reviewed World War II for Different Worlds magazine and stated that "World War II is big and plays slowly at first. It is principally a two-player contest and is not for beginners. But those who have enjoyed Third Reich will find this new strategic treatment of Europe in World War II a flavorsome meal to attack and digest."

In Issue 3 of Strategy Plus, Jonathan Turner found the long rule book of the TSR edition "clear, well laid out and allows play with the minimal amount of homework." Turner liked the first three scenarios that he felt allowed the players to come to grips with the complex game, but commented "the feel of the game is particularly impressive when one finally graduates to the major scenarios." Turner admitted that the game was so large that "it is difficult to do this game justice. The extraordinary aspect is that play of it is so smooth under the weight of all the chrome." Turner concluded, "World War Two: European Theatre of Operations is an excellent game for the adamantine hardcore gamer ... This could be just what we were all looking for to fill the odd idle decade when we don’t have anything better to do. "

In Issue 4 of Vieille Garde, Luc Olivier liked the second edition published by TSR, writing, "ETO, once all the rules are understood and mastered, is a superb game useful for recreating and understanding the events of the global conflict. The operating system is very satisfactory and allows many subtleties; great strategies are possible and encouraged by the elaboration of serious plans." The only weakness Olivier found in the game was the political system, "which despite non-historical options tends too much to 'push towards history.'"
