= Yeoman (game) =

1975 Medieval board wargame

Yeoman, subtitled "Tactical Warfare in the Renaissance Age, 1250-1550", is a board wargame published by Simulations Publications, Inc. (SPI) in 1975 that simulates battles during the Late Medieval period and Renaissance. Originally published by SPI as Renaissance of Infantry, the game was revised and republished with the title Yeoman as part of a collection of games called PRESTAGS ("Pre-Seventeenth Century Tactical Game System").

== Description ==
Yeoman is a two-player tactical board wargame in which one player controls a force such as the English at Agincourt, the Scottish at Falkirk, or the French at Courtrai, and the other player controls the force that met them in battle. Eighteen scenarios are outlined, including the battles of Crecy, Legnano, and Benevento.

The game system used by all games of the PRESTAGS series is a simple "I Go, You Go" system of alternating turns where one player fires missiles (arrows, javelins, etc.), moves and attacks, followed by the other player. More complexity can be added by using optional rules for panic, leadership, facing, melee and simultaneous movement.

In addition to the PRESTAGS rules, Yeoman also has rules unique to the period, including forming a square formation, ferocity of certain warriors, chivalric knights (must attack if the enemy is in sight), and longbowmen.

== Publication history ==
In 1970, SPI game designer Albert A. Nofi created a game that was set in the late Medieval period. Nofi's game was included as a pull-out game titled Tactical Game 13 in Issue 22 of SPI's house magazine, Strategy & Tactics (August 1970). Later the same year, the game was released as a boxed set titled Renaissance of Infantry, and included twenty different scenarios.

At the same time, SPI also published four other games by various designers set in ancient or Medieval history. In 1975, SPI decided to gather these five disparate games together under the name PRESTAGS ("Pre-Seventeenth Century Tactical Game System"), and tasked John Young with creating a single set of rules that all the PRESTAGS games would use. One of the games converted to the new system was Renaissance of Infantry, retitled Yeoman. (The other PRESTAGS games are Chariot, Legion, Spartan, and Viking.)

The new game Yeoman replaced seven of the scenarios in the previous game with five new ones, leaving a total of 18 scenarios.

Yeoman was published as a single game in 1975 and immediately moved into SPI's Top Ten Bestseller List at #9. Yeoman was also published with the other four games as PRESTAGS Master-Pack.

== Reception ==
In a 1976 poll conducted by SPI to determine the most popular board wargames in North America, Yeoman was rated at 44th out of 202 games.

In the January 1976 edition of Airfix Magazine, Bruce Quarrie noted "these rules allow a wide degree of flexibility in approach to the game. It can be an absolutely basic and 'unrealistic' affair [...] or by addition of optional Panic, Facing and Melee rules, and a [simultaneous movement sequence, it reproduces quite accurately the true conditions of the time." He concluded, "In general [...] the result is as SPI intended, to satisfy both those who desire a simple format and those who can assimilate relatively complex restrictions."

In his 1977 book The Comprehensive Guide to Board Wargaming, Nicky Palmer thought the special rules for Yeoman — "squares, foolhardy cavalry, longbowmen, trenches, cavalry traps and artillery limbering" — gave the game a "fair 'period' feel."

In The Guide to Simulations/Games for Education and Training, Martin Campion noted the changes from Renaissance of Infantry to Yeoman, saying, "The rules are somewhat simplified although the standard rules for the [PRESTAGS] series are considerably modified by the special rules for Yeoman. The scenarios, when kept, are improved [...] The change to these games from their predecessors was generally a happy one, but sometimes some of the flavor of the individual periods was lost in the process."

In the 1980 book The Complete Book of Wargames, game designer Jon Freeman commented, "Yeoman is a bit more complex than the others in the [PRESTAGS] system because combat became more complicated with the introduction of gunpowder." Freeman gave this game an Overall Evaluation of "Good".

== Reviews ==
- Fire & Movement #71
