= Nofi =

Nofi may refer to:

- Albert Nofi (born 1944), American historian and game designer
- No-Fi, music or media created outside conventional technical standard
