= Spartan: Tactical Warfare in the Hellenistic Age, 500–100BC =

Board wargame published in 1975

Spartan: Tactical Warfare in the Hellenistic Age, 500–100BC is a board wargame published by Simulations Publications, Inc. (SPI) in 1975 that simulates battles during the rise of Greece to the period of Roman rule. Originally published by SPI as Phalanx, the game was revised and republished with the title Spartan as part of a series called PRESTAGS ("Pre-Seventeenth Century Tactical Game System").

== Description ==
Spartan is a two-player tactical board wargame in which one player controls Greek, Macedonian or Spartan forces, and the other player controls historic enemies during the period 500–1000 BC, including Persians, and Carthaginians. Seventeen scenarios are outlined, including the battles of Marathon, Plataea, and Corinth.

The game system used by all games of the PRESTAGS series is a simple "I Go, You Go" system of alternating turns where one player moves and fires, followed by the other player. More complexity can be added by using optional rules for panic, leadership, facing, melee and simultaneous movement.

In addition to the PRESTAGS rules, Spartan also has rules unique to the Greek era, including the use of elephants and special leaders.

== Publication history ==
In 1971, John Young designed a game about historic battles during the Greek period that was published by SPI titled Phalanx. Over the next three years, SPI published other similar games set in ancient and medieval eras. In 1975, SPI decided to gather five of these disparate games together under the name PRESTAGS ("Pre-Seventeenth Century Tactical Game System"), and tasked Young with creating a single set of rules that all the PRESTAGS games would use. One of the games converted to the new system was Phalanx, retitled Spartan. (The other PRESTAGS games are Chariot, Legion, Viking, and Yeoman.)

Upon publication, Spartan immediately moved into SPI's Top Ten Bestseller List, debuting at #6.

== Reception ==
In a 1976 poll conducted by SPI to determine the most popular board wargames in North America, Spartan was very highly rated, coming in 23rd out of 202 games.}

In the January 1976 edition of Airfix Magazine, Bruce Quarrie noted that "these rules allow a wide degree of flexibility in approach to the game. It can be an absolutely basic and 'unrealistic' affair [...] or by addition of optional Panic, Facing and Melee rules, and a [simultaneous movement] sequence, it reproduces quite accurately the true conditions of the time." He concluded, "In general [...] the result is as SPI intended, to satisfy both those who desire a simple format and those who can assimilate relatively complex restrictions."

In his 1977 book The Comprehensive Guide to Board Wargaming, Nick Palmer noted that "the main special feature is elephants, who have the nasty habit of running amok after being in combat."

In the 1980 book The Complete Book of Wargames, game designer Jon Freeman called it "a marvelous, if colorless, way to introduce people to wargaming and the early historical periods." He was disappointed that "Neither the maps or counters have historical designations. [...] one battle has little to distinguish it from another." He also questioned how the historicity of any battle was maintained, since, "because of counter-mix limitations and the generalized nature of the system, many of the orders of battle for individual scenarios are warped or downright inaccurate." He concluded by giving the game an Overall Evaluation of "Good", saying, "The system is clean, and most battles can be played in a short time. If you are not too concerned with the limitations of the system, the variety of scenarios makes each game a bargain."

In The Guide to Simulations/Games for Education and Training, Martin Campion didn't like some of the changes made to Phalanx in order to "fit it into the [PRESTAGS] series", saying, "The scale of the map has been doubled [...] Unfortunately the number of different units has been cut down and the names of the units changed." However, Campion thought the scenarios had been improved "with the addition of more careful victory conditions and the rules that tailor the terrain to the simulated battle."

In Issue 47 of Moves, Ben Miller contended that the first recorded use of the sarissa long spear by Macedonian infantry did not occur until the Battle of Gaugamela in 331 BC; before that, the sarissa was only used by the Macedonian cavalry. Miller pointed out that Spartan allows infantry to use the sarissa earlier than this. Miller suggested several rule changes to make Spartan more historically accurate in this respect, and concluded, "When implemented, these aforementioned rules changes will lessen the role of the phalanx to a certain extent, but it maintains an important position. In reality, the cavalry assumed a crucial function. The cavalry should be used to punch holes in the enemy's flanks and dislocate their ability to fight."

== Other reviews and commentary ==
- Fire & Movement #71
