= Weaponry (disambiguation) =

Weaponry refers to weapons or weaponlike instruments collectively.

It may also refer to:

- Weaponry (radio program)
- Weaponry (song)
