= Viking (game) =

1975 medieval board wargame

Viking, subtitled "Tactical Warfare in the Dark Ages, 700-1300", is a board wargame published by Simulations Publications, Inc. (SPI) in 1975 that simulates battles in Europe and the Middle East during the Medieval period. Originally published by SPI as Dark Ages, the game was revised and republished with the title Viking as part of a collection of games called PRESTAGS ("Pre-Seventeenth Century Tactical Game System").

== Description ==
Viking is a two-player tactical board wargame in which one player controls one force such as Byzantines, Vikings, or Normans, and the other player controls the force that met them in battle. Nineteen scenarios are outlined, including the battles of Tours, Stamford Bridge, and Hattin.

The game system used by all games of the PRESTAGS series is a simple "I Go, You Go" system of alternating turns where one player fires missiles (arrows, javelins, etc.), moves and attacks, followed by the other player. More complexity can be added by using optional rules for panic, leadership, facing, melee and simultaneous movement.

In addition to the PRESTAGS rules, Viking also has rules unique to the medieval period, including the use of fransisca throwing axes, berserkers and longboats.

== Publication history ==
In 1971, Stephen Patrick designed a game about historic battles during the medieval period that was published by the new wargame company SPI as Dark Ages. At about the same time, SPI also published four other games by various designers set in ancient or Renaissance history. In 1975, SPI decided to gather these disparate games together under the name PRESTAGS ("Pre-Seventeenth Century Tactical Game System"), and tasked John Young with creating a single set of rules that all the PRESTAGS games would use. One of the games converted to the new system was Dark Ages, retitled Viking. (The other PRESTAGS games are Chariot, Legion, Spartan, and Yeoman.)

Viking was published as a single game and immediately moved into SPI's Top Ten Bestseller List at #7. Viking was also published with the other four games as PRESTAGS Master-Pack.

== Reception ==
In a 1976 poll conducted by SPI to determine the most popular board wargames in North America, Viking was rated at 54th out of 202 games.

In the January 1976 edition of Airfix Magazine, Bruce Quarrie noted "these rules allow a wide degree of flexibility in approach to the game. It can be an absolutely basic and 'unrealistic' affair [...] or by addition of optional Panic, Facing and Melee rules, and a [simultaneous movement sequence, ir reproduces quite accurately the true conditions of the time." He concluded, "In general [...] the result is as SPI intended, to satisfy both those who desire a simple format and those who can assimilate relatively complex restrictions."

In Issue 21 of the British wargaming magazine Perfidious Albion, Charles Vasey investigated the historical accuracy of each scenario of this game, and concluded, "Looking at this list, things are not too bad. The scenarios are about 50% correct, with another 25% just needing tinkering with. The Arab armies [in about 25% of the scenarios] are the biggest offenders."

In his 1977 book The Comprehensive Guide to Board Wargaming, Nick Palmer appreciated the simplicity of the rules, but felt that the game suffered by having a single generic map, commenting, "the map is mostly nondescript, with great expanses of clear terrain and a few hills, rivers and other features dotted about. [...] The anonymous map inhibits the usual wargames enjoyment of refighting a particular battle." Palmer also noted that's "Game length is shorter than usual (2–4 hours)."

In Issue 23 of the UK wargaming magazine Phoenix, Robert Musson felt that "flaws in the original design not only make it impossible for one side to win, they make it impossible for the historical winners to win, which is clearly undesirable in anything that purports to be a simulation. [...] In a large number of scenarios [the game] transparently does not work."

In the 1980 book The Complete Book of Wargames, game designer Jon Freeman called the game "a marvelous, if colorless, way to introduce people to wargaming and the early historical periods." He was disappointed that "Neither the maps or counters have historical designations. [...] one battle has little to distinguish it from another." He also questioned how the historicity of any battle was maintained, since, "because of counter-mix limitations and the generalized nature of the system, many of the orders of battle for individual scenarios are warped or downright inaccurate." He concluded by giving the game an Overall Evaluation of "Good", saying, "The system is clean, and most battles can be played in a short time. If you are not too concerned with the limitations of the system, the variety of scenarios makes each game a bargain."

In The Guide to Simulations/Games for Education and Training, Martin Campion noted the changes that had been made to the original game Dark Ages to produce the new game Viking, including "four more scenarios [...] The rules are simplified. The counter mix includes one kind of counter less. The map has been changed considerably." Campion also pointed out that terrain can now be modified for several scenarios, and there is an optional simultaneous movement rule.
