= R. L. DiNardo =

Author and historian

Richard L. DiNardo is an author and historian. He authored books about significant events in the 19th and 20th centuries, such as World War I, World War II, and other related events. He has worked with other author-historians, such as Daniel J. Hughes, Albert A. Nofi, David Syrett and Williamson Murray.

== Books ==
- James Longstreet: The Man, The Soldier, The Controversy (1988)
- Mechanized Juggernaut Or Military Anachronism? Horses and the German Army of World War II (1991)
- Germany's Panzer Arm in World War II (1997)
- Germany and The Axis powers from Coalition and Collapse (2005)
- Breakthrough: The Gorlice-Tarnow Campaign, 1915 (2010)
- Invasion: The Conquest of Serbia 1915 (2015)
- Turning Points: The Eastern Front in 1915 (2020)
