= Pearl Harbor (disambiguation) =

Pearl Harbor is a lagoon harbor on the island of Oʻahu, Hawaiʻi, west of Honolulu.

Pearl Harbor may also refer to:

== History ==
- Attack on Pearl Harbor, the 7 December 1941 Japanese attack on the American naval base

== Places ==
- Joint Base Pearl Harbor–Hickam, the joint United States Navy and Air Force base in Oahu
- Pearl Harbour, New Zealand, a small harbor at the head of the Waiau River
- Pearl Harbor National Wildlife Refuge

== Military ==
- USS Pearl Harbor (LSD-52), a US Navy amphibious assault ship

== Films and television ==
- Tora! Tora! Tora!, 1970 film about the 7 December 1941 Japanese attack on Pearl Harbor
- Pearl Harbor (film), a 2001 film based on the 7 December 1941 Japanese attack
- "Pearl Harbor" (Malcolm in the Middle), a season six episode of the television series Malcolm in the Middle

== Novels ==
- Pearl Harbor: A Novel of December 8th, a book by Newt Gingrich and William R. Forstchen

== Music ==
- Pearl Harbor and the Explosions, a new-wave band formed in 1978

== Games ==
- Pearl Harbor (wargame), a 1977 wargame that simulates the Pacific Campaign of World War II
