= Spies! =

1981 espionage board game

- SPI edition, 1981
- Designers: John Prados
- Illustrators: Redmond A. Simonsen
- Publishers: Simulations Publications Inc.
- Publication: 1981
- Genres: 1930s espionage

Spies! is a board game published by Simulations Publications, Inc. (SPI) in 1981 that simulates international espionage in Europe in the years leading up to World War II.

== Description ==
Spies! is a game for 2–5 players. Each player represents one of the Great Powers in the 1930s (France, Germany, Great Britain, Italy and Russia), and attempts to steal secrets in the period leading up to the start of World War II while protecting their own secrets.

=== Components ===
The game box contains:

- 22" x 34" map of Europe
- 50 Event tiles
- 200 die-cut counters
- 4-page standard rules
- 4-page Long Game rules
- 11" x 17" display

=== Setup ===
The game board and display are set up with the Year marker on 1933. Each player then:

- Chooses a Power. If fewer than five players are present, some of the players take on more than one country.
- Takes Event Tiles, draws Action chits and draws 7 random Secrets, placing them facedown on the cities within their territory.
- Deploys police in their cities, and places spies facedown in any cities on the map.

Any remaining Secrets are placed facedown on the neutral cities.

=== Gameplay ===
Players always go in the following order: Germany, Italy, Russia, France, Britain. During their turn, the active player must discard any facedown Event Tiles or play any face-up Event Tiles that are marked with the current game year. Players may also rearrange police, search for enemy spies, move their own spies to search for or move secrets, and cash in secrets. During another player's turn, a player may search for arriving spies, play Action chits, and respond to diplomacy.

=== Victory conditions ===
At the end of the final turn (Britain in 1939), each secret in a player's territory not controlled by an enemy spy is placed on that country's 1939 column on the game display. Every secret, captured spy and sanctioned marker now generates Victory Points. The player with the most Victory Points wins the game. In the event of a tie, the most money accumulated is the tiebreaker.

== Publication history ==
Spies! was designed by John Prados and Lenny Glynn, with graphics and design by Redmond A. Simonsen, and was published by SPI in 1981. The following year, TSR took over SPI and attempted to get a quick return on their money by publishing several SPI games that had been close to publication such as Battle Over Britain, as well as re-publishing several popular SPI titles such as Spies!.

== Reception ==
In Issue 51 of the British wargaming magazine Perfidious Albion, Charles Vasey noted, "Its general appearance and tone is reminiscent of games like Escape from Colditz and Monopoly. Rules are short, and I rather like the event tiles as against counters/cards."

In Issue 45 of The Space Gamer, David Dunham found the game a bit expensive, but concluded, "I'd recommend this game to anyone who wants a simple, but not shallow, game he can play with several players. Given the price, this would be a good buy for a gaming club."

In Issue 60 of Moves, Claude Bloodgood warned that this game was "not for slow thinkers. Each action can have sudden repercussions as well as potential benefits." He concluded "Spies! offers real enjoyment and challenge with one of the briefest and clearest set of rules around."

In Issue 35 of Phoenix, Richard Aldridge, who was from Coventry, pointed out that on the game map, Coventry and Birmingham have been transposed. Aldridge also noted that the Scapa Flow had been moved from the Orkney Islands to the Shetland Islands. Despite this, he gave a recommendation to buy the game, saying, "Spies! makesa a nice change of pace from the run-of-the-mill wargame and there is always plenty going on. It's light-hearted, enjoyable nonsense but the more you play it, the more you find out that it has hidden depths."

John O'Neil, writing for Black Gate, found the setting to be dynamic, and also found "The sheer scope of the game is another big plus." He also found it easy to learn. He concluded with a positive recommendation, saying, "Spies! is a unique game of geopolitical intrigue, and I've never played another game like it. It wasn't the best game SPI ever produced, but it's one of my favorites, and it's still worth playing today."

== Awards ==
At the 1982 Charles S. Roberts Awards, Spies! was a finalist for "Best Twentieth Century Game of 1981".

== Other reviews ==
- Casus Belli #23 (Dec 1984)
- Fire & Movement #28
- Wargamer Vol. I No. 21
- Richard Berg's Review of Games #21
- Simulations Canada #5
- Games
- 1981 Games 100 in Games
