= Year of the Rat, Vietnam, 1972 =

Board wargame published in 1972

Cover of Strategy & Tactics #35, which contained Year of the Rat as a pull-out game

Year of the Rat, Vietnam, 1972 is a board wargame published by Simulations Publications Inc. (SPI) in 1972 that simulates the Easter Offensive that had just happened during the Vietnam War.

== Background ==
In March 1972, North Vietnam launched a massive offensive against South Vietnamese and American forces, hoping to achieve either a decisive victory or at least a better bargaining position at the Paris peace talks. The magnitude of the attack caught the defenders off balance, and the fighting continued through the summer of 1972.

== Description ==
Year of the Rat is a two-player board wargame where one player controls North Vietnamese forces, and the other player controls South Vietnamese and American forces. North Vietnamese forces start facedown and include "dummy" counters, so that the other player is unsure of the disposition of combat strengths. With a large 22" x 34" hex grid map of South Vietnam and parts of Cambodia, 200 die-cut counters, and rules about helicopter transport, unit supply and air strikes, the game has been characterized as "moderately complex.". The North Vietnamese have the ability to move off-road, but the Allied player's American units enjoy air mobility via helicopters, and the firepower of B-52 bombing raids.

=== Gameplay ===
The game uses a series of "I Go, You Go" alternating turns, in which the North Vietnamese player first moves and initiates combat. The American player then has the same opportunity, with the addition of naval and air bombardment. This completes one turn, which represents one week of the 13-week offensive. The game ends after 13 turns.

=== Scenarios ===
The game comes with three scenarios:

1. Historical: Both players use historical orders of battle and troop placements.
2. Variable Orders of Battle: A "what if?" scenario in which each player can choose from a list of six possible orders of battle.
3. Free placement: Another "what if?" scenario. The historical orders of battle are used but both players choose the starting locations for their forces.

== Publication history ==
In the late 1960s, John Prados had become interested in board wargames while in high school. While studying political science at Columbia University, Prados designed a wargame about the just completed Easter Offensive in Vietnam and offered it to the new wargame publisher SPI. Company co-founder Jim Dunnigan liked the premise and accepted it for publication but found the game mechanics unworkable, later writing, "I had to completely re-design it to get it to work." Dunnigan's revisions were extensive enough that although Prados was given credit for game design, Dunnigan was credited for game-system design. In November 1972, only a few months after the end of the Easter Offensive, SPI released Year of the Rat as a pull-out game with graphic design by Redmond A. Simonsen in Strategy & Tactics #35. The game was also released in SPI's new "flat pack" plastic box with integrated counter tray.

== Reception ==
SPI co-founder Jim Dunnigan noted that Year of the Rat "Got high praise from players with access to classified details of actual operations." However, in a 1976 poll conducted by SPI to determine the most popular board wargames in North America, Year of the Rat placed a poor 159th out of 202 games.

In his 1977 book The Comprehensive Guide to Board Wargaming, Nick Palmer complimented the evenness of the game, calling it "Fairly well balanced and skill demanding on both sides (especially the Communists, who lose heavily in all straightforward fights in the open.)" Despite this, Palmer concluded that the game was "not wildly exciting."

In Issue 27 of Moves, Phil Kosnett found that having only one main scenario limited the replayability of Year of the Rat, and proposed four new scenarios simulating the recently concluded March 1975 Ho Chi Minh Campaign by North Vietnam that had quickly brought an end to the Vietnam War.

Likewise Issue 9 of JagdPanther also published new scenarios for Year of the Rat, including a Cambodia variant, and a variant focused on North Vietnam's final March 1975 offensive.

In Issue 18 of Fire & Movement, Rodger B. MacGowan noted, "Year of the Rat is one of the most important games on the Vietnam War and should be in your games library."

== Reviews ==
- Panzerfaust Magazine #63
