= New York Military Affairs Symposium =

Organization in New York City

- Abbreviation: NYMAS
- Formation: 1970s
- Type: Non-profit organization
- Purpose: NYMAS is devoted to increasing public knowledge, awareness, and understanding of the interrelationship of war, society, and culture through the presentation and dissemination of diverse scholarly viewpoints.
- Location: New York City, United States
- Region served: New York City
- Members: 120
- Official language: English
- President: Prof. David Gordon
- Affiliations: Society for Military History
- Staff: 8 Officers and 8 members of Board of Directors
- Volunteers: All officers are voluntary staff
- Website: www.nymas.org

The New York Military Affairs Symposium (NYMAS), is an independent, not-for-profit educational body dedicated to the preservation and furthering of military history in New York City. The membership includes scholars, active and retired military personnel, and concerned civilians. NYMAS is devoted to increasing public knowledge, awareness and understanding of military history, arms control, international relations, defense policy, disarmament, civil-military relations, international security, Veterans Affairs and the interrelationship of war, society, and culture through the presentation and dissemination of diverse scholarly viewpoints - with particular reference to the history of warfare involving the United States and of Americans at war.

== Background ==
NYMAS has it origins in the late 1970s, when some graduate students in military history from CUNY, members of the Arms Control Workshop at Columbia University, and a number of interested laymen began holding periodic informal study groups, at Columbia, the Loeb Student Center at New York University, the former CUNY Graduate Center on 42nd Street, and in private homes.

In 1982 NYMAS was incorporated as a not-for-profit academic organization under the laws of the State of New York.

== Overview ==
Since incorporation, NYMAS has hosted more than a thousand guests, including scholars working in many diverse disciplines, as well as journalists, graduate students, active and former military personnel, museum curators, peace activists, novelists, diplomats, political leaders, documentarians, and many more. Many guests have been well-established scholars or specialists in their fields, such as Sir Michael Howard, Gerhard Weinberg, Gary Sick, Geoffrey P. Megargee, Peter Paret, David Glantz, Morris Rossabi, Sir John Keegan, Thomas Fleming, Sir Jeremy Black, Gunther E. Rothenberg, Ellen Schrecker, Sir Max Hastings, David Kahn, Susan Shwartz, Kevin Baker, Theodore Cook, and Christopher Duffy. Most, however, have been younger scholars, a number of whom have subsequently attained some measure of fame, such as James S. Corum, Ross Hassig, David Petraeus, Peter Mansoor, and Arden Bucholz, to note but a few.

NYMAS currently presents twenty-three lectures each academic year. These are given by scholars, journalists, diplomats, active and retired military personnel, and knowledgeable laymen represent viewpoints all across the political spectrum. In addition, NYMAS usually holds two day-and-a-half conferences each year, bringing together scholars, veterans, diplomats, and others, to explore a particular topic in some depth, and occasionally holds special events.

== Sampling of programs ==
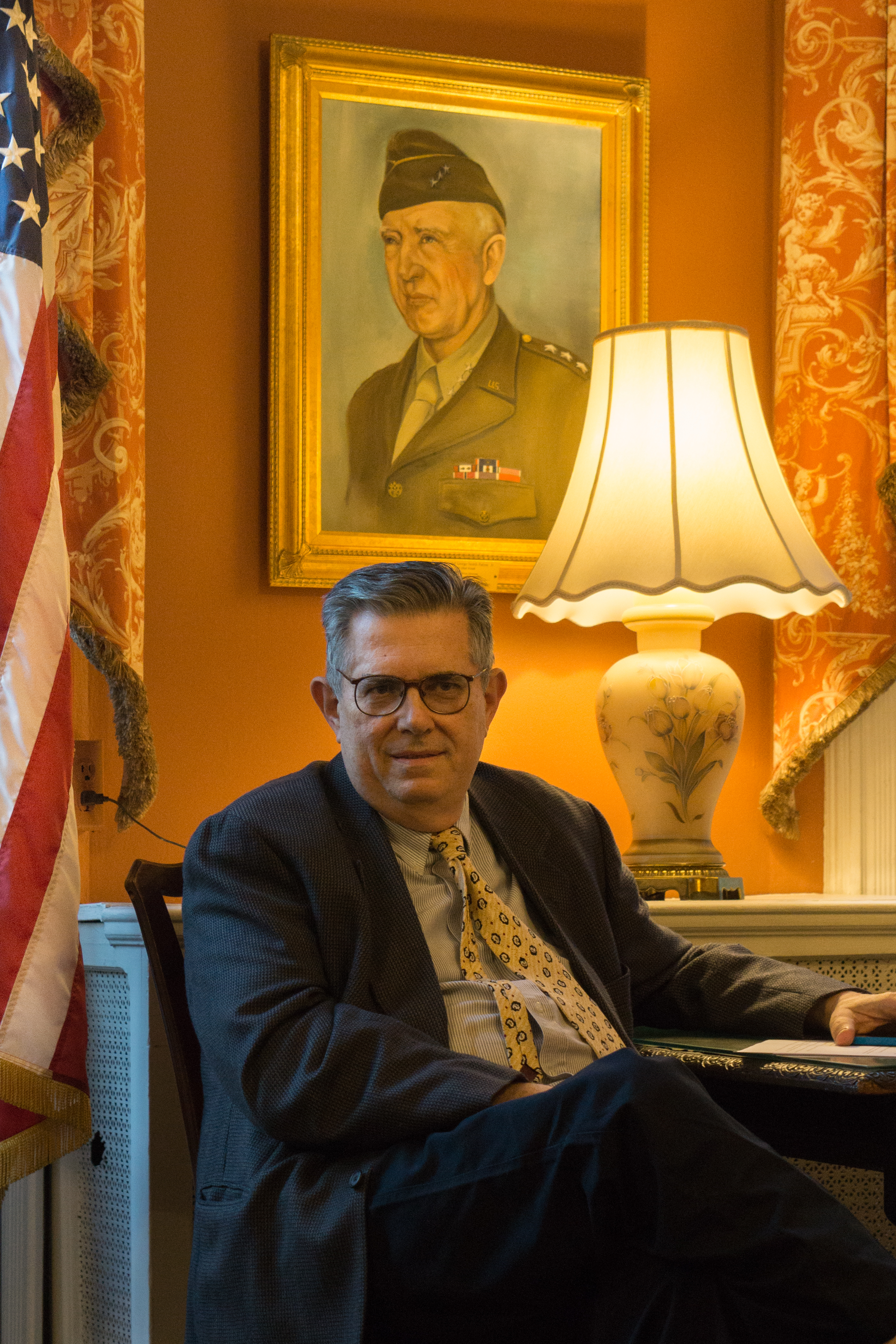
Robert Miller: Executive Director of NYMAS; 2015

A short list of some of the talks given over the years illustrates the breadth of interests and topics covered by NYMAS:

- "Imperialism and World System Formation: The Case of Teotihuacan"
- "Strategy and Technology in the American Civil War"
- "Ancient Greek and Roman Military Leadership"
- "The French Army and the Dreyfus Affair"
- "Islamic-Mongol Warfare"
- "'High Treason': The Stalinist Purges"
- "William Donovan, Mussolini, and the Ethiopian War"
- "Amphibious Warfare Doctrine in the Inter-War Years"
- "Fortification and Authority in Medieval Ireland"
- "Racism in the Frontier Army"
- "The Battle of Brooklyn"
- "Hell Fighters from Harlem"
- "Horses, Hitler, and the German Army"
- "The Jewish Contribution in The Civil War"
- "Winston Churchill and the Dardanelles"
- "Warfare in Roman Britain"
- "My Lai and the International Criminal Court,"
- "Taranto: Europe's Pearl Harbor?"
- "Warfare Among the Northwest Coast Indians"
- "Eighteenth Century British Amphibious Operations in the Caribbean"
- "Women Writers, National Socialism, and World War II"
- "Airpower in the Spanish Civil War"

NYMAS talks are frequently broadcast on CSPAN's American History TV

NYMAS conferences have dealt with such topics as "The New Balkan Wars", "1942: Year of Decision", "The Novelist and the Historian", "The Invasion of Japan, 1945", "Military Operations on the Eastern Front, 1944-1945", "Longstreet Reconsidered", which led to the publication of James Longstreet: The Man, the Soldier, the Controversy (1998), and "The Makers of Non-Western Strategy."

NYMAS often co-sponsors events, over the years having partnered with the CUNY Office of Veterans' Affairs, Independent Network News, the School of International and Public Affairs, Columbia University, Committee for a SANE Nuclear Policy, the New York City CWRT, the New York University East Asian Studies Program, the Western Front Association, Weaponry (radio program) on WBAI, and other groups in arranging lectures or conferences.

In addition to lectures and conferences, NYMAS has occasionally sponsored or co-sponsored special events, such as museum tours, film screenings, staff rides, and historical re-enactments.

== NYMAS book awards ==
NYMAS publishes a quarterly review of recent literature for members, and annually presents The Arthur Goodzeit Book Award, for the best new work in military history or a related field, and The Fiet Award, which can go to a notable new book on the American Civil War or to a distinguished scholar for lifetime achievement. The award includes $1,000 prize money, courtesy of Robert and Martha Rowen.

== Legal status and administration ==
NYMAS is a tax exempt membership corporation chartered under the laws of New York State and is associated with the Society for Military History, Region 2.

Presidents of NYMAS:

- Prof. Brian R. Sullivan, Yale, The Naval War College, & National Defense University, 1982-1990
- Prof. David Syrett, CUNY, 1990-2004
- Prof. David Gordon; CUNY, 2004-date

Executive Directors:

- Geraldo Trombella
- Robert L. Miller 1945-2016
- Dan David
- Eugene Feit 1948-2010
- Kathleen Broome Williams

== Selection of previous speakers and topics ==
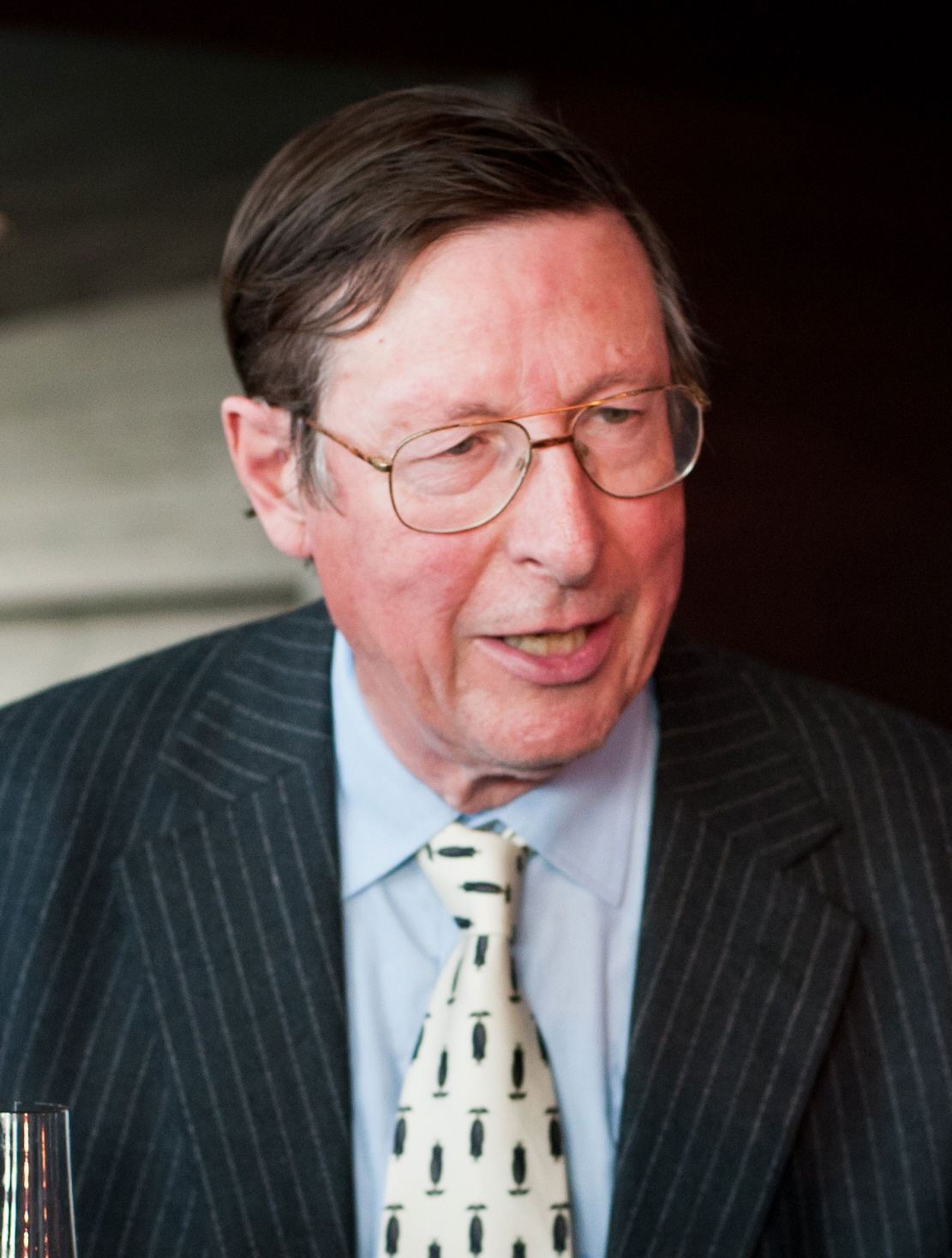
Sir Max Hastings: Retribution

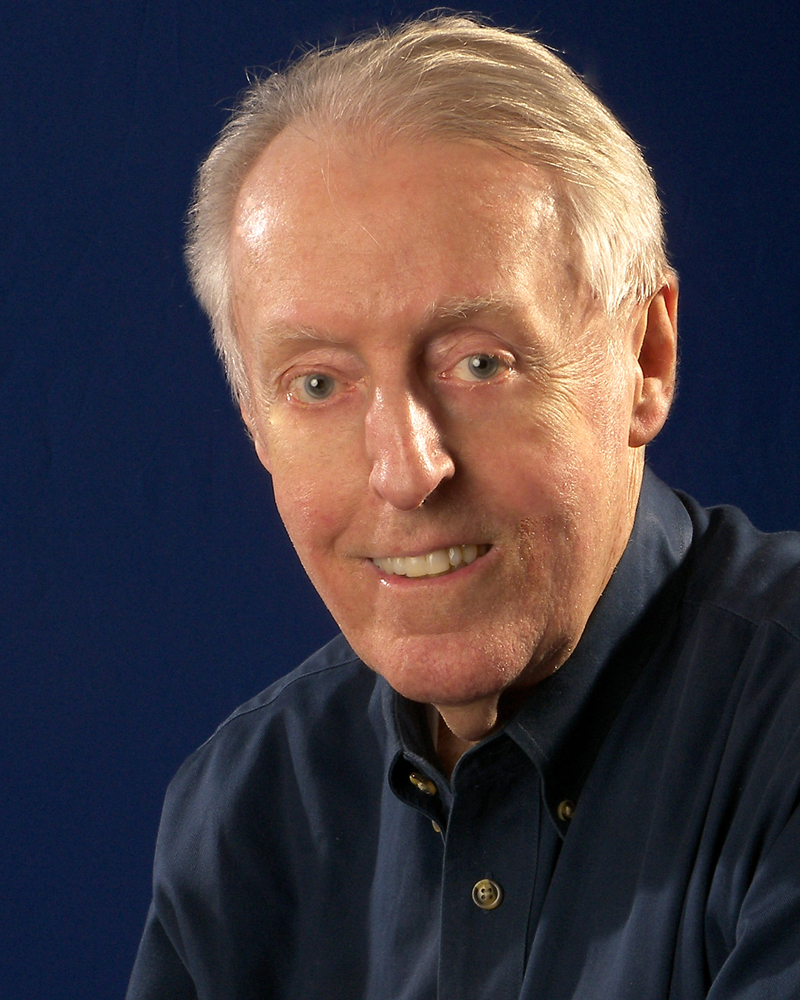
Thomas Fleming:The Perils of Peace

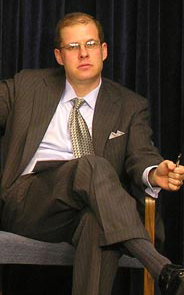
Max Boot: War Made New

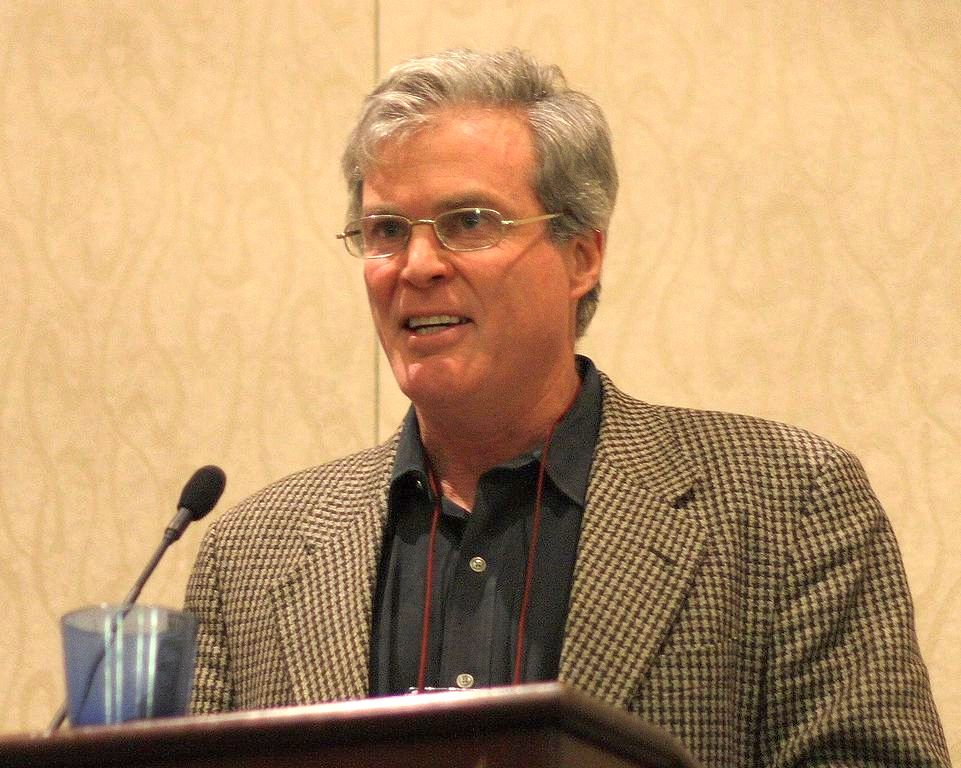
John Horgan: The End of War

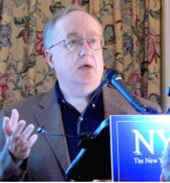
Steven Zaloga: Rommel's Defense of Omaha Beach

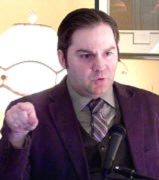
Sean McMeekin: July 1914: Countdown to War

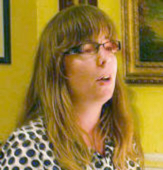
Valerie Deacon: Rightists in the French Resistance

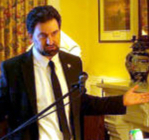
Clifford J. Rogers: The first century of gunpowder artillery in Europe: 1326-1450

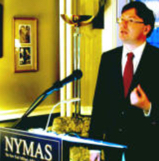
Adrian Goldsworthy: Roman Warfare

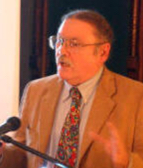
John Prados: The Solomons Campaign and the eclipse of the Rising Sun

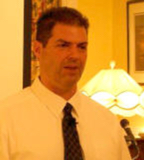
Martin Scott Catino: "The most peaceful valley in Afghanistan"

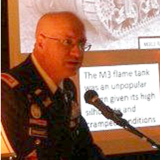
Major John P. Ringquist: Flamethrower tanks and doctrine in WWII technology

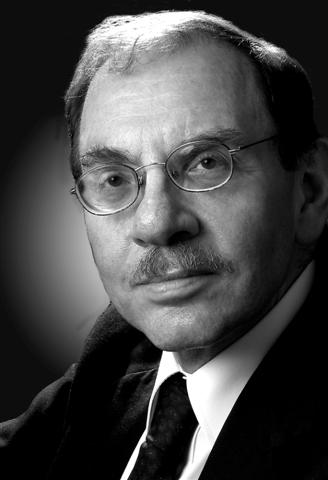
Albert Nofi: Naval aviation and U.S. Fleet problems, 1923-1940

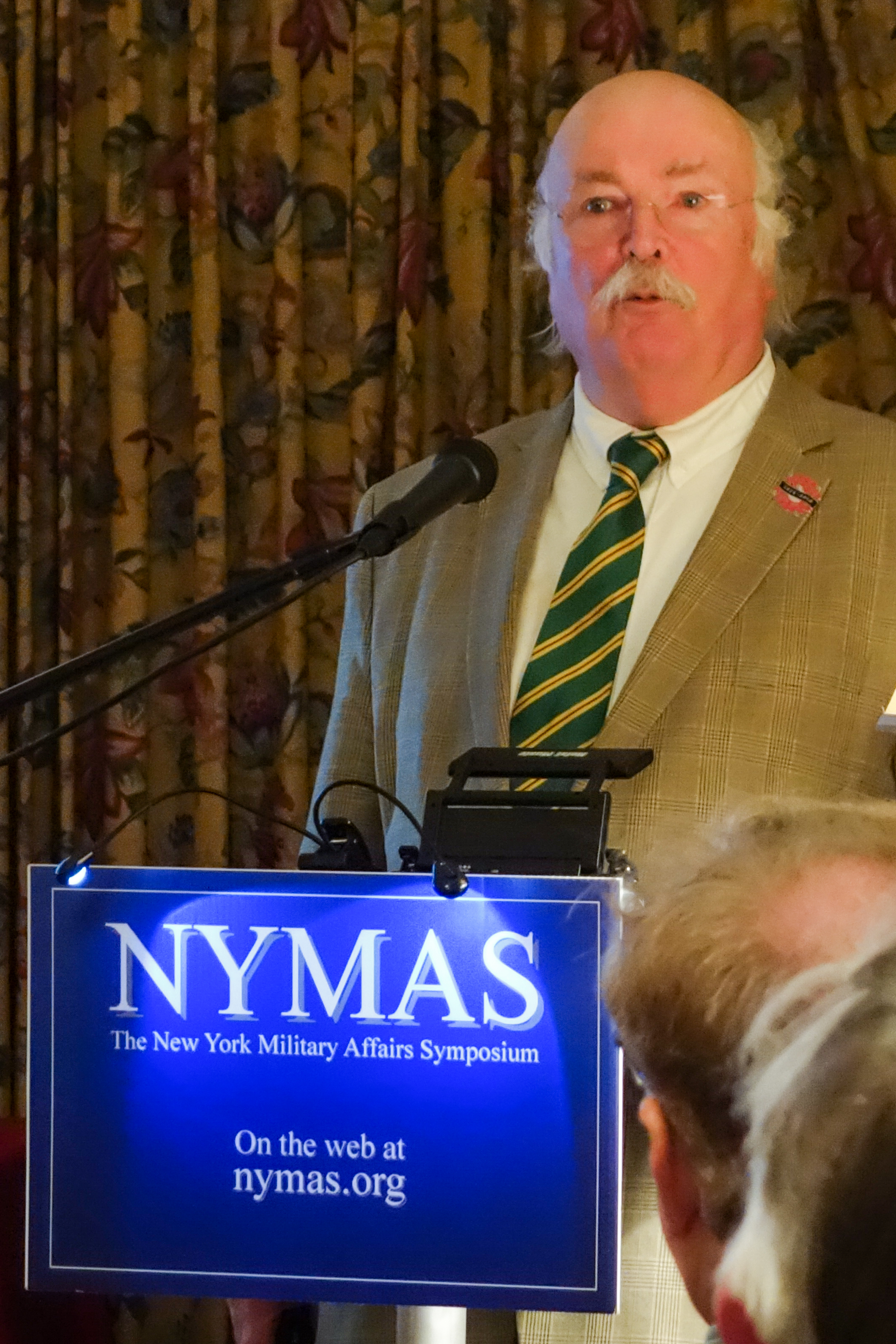
Theodore F. Cook, Jr: The Battle of Britain through Japanese Eyes

== See also ==
- List of historical societies in New York (state)
