= Weaponry (radio program) =

American radio profram

Weaponry was the only regularly scheduled radio broadcast program about weapons in the United States. Devoted to military and aviation technology, history, hardware, policy, news, reviews, and analysis, from 1982 to 2013 Weaponry aired on WBAI radio, 99.5 FM in the New York City metropolitan area Wednesday mornings from 1:00 a.m. to 2:00 a.m. A 90-day archive of the program was also available on the station's website.

Guests on the program included historians and specialists in the fields of military and aviation science, history, and technology, among them Eric Foner and Albert Nofi. Other guests included Generals William Westmoreland and Paul Tibbets, the captain of the USS Vincennes following the Iran Air Flight 655 shoot-down, medical evacuation helicopter pilot Michael Novosel, Wake Island battle veterans, and the sole survivor of Torpedo Squadron 8 at Midway.

Tom Wisker (1951-2020), the sole host of Weaponry throughout its production, was a member of the New York Military Affairs Symposium, and of several other military and aviation historical organizations. Wisker's particular topics of scholarly interest are the United States Army Air Forces and the Israeli Air Force.
