= Wellington in the Peninsula =

1975 Napoleonic board wargame

Cover of rulebook

Wellington in the Peninsula is a Napoleonic board wargame published by Rand Game Associates (RGA) in 1975 that simulates the Peninsular War of the early 19th century.

== Background ==
In 1807, Spain and France formed an alliance to invade Portugal. The following year, Napoleon betrayed his erstwhile ally by invading Spain. Portugal and the United Kingdom formed an alliance with Spain to aid in its liberation. The bloody war that followed lasted until Napoleon's overthrow in 1814.

== Description ==
Wellington in the Peninsula is a two-player board wargame in which one player controls French forces, and the other player controls the Anglo-Spanish alliance under the Duke of Wellington.

The map is divided into areas rather than the industry-standard hex grid. Guerrilla forces can play a significant role in the various scenarios.

=== Gameplay ===
The game uses an alternating "I Go, You Go" system, where one player moves and attacks, followed by the second player. This completes one game turn, which represents 30 days. Rules also cover forced marches, sea movement, retreat before combat, supply, attrition, fortifications, sieges, and special rules for each nationality involved. Optional rules allow leaders to affect the game.

=== Scenarios ===
There are nine scenarios in the game, each with different victory conditions for each player. The scenarios can be combined into a long campaign game.

== Publication history ==
Wellington in the Peninsula was designed by Vincent Cumbo, Albert Nofi, and John Prados, and published by RGA in 1975. In a 1976 poll conducted by Simulations Publications Inc. to determine the most popular board wargames in North America, Wellington in the Peninsula placed 87th out of 202 games.

== Reception ==
In Issue 6 of Perfidious Albion, Charles Vasey and Geoff Barnard traded comments about the game. Barnard noted, "For someone who is generally not interested in the Napoleonic era, and also, to a certain extent, in strategic games, I found this game most enjoyable. The rules manage to incorporate a great deal of colour without getting unduly complicated." Vasey replied, "This is a very well designed game, the designers have done most of the work already so you can just sit down and solve the problems of winning. The game manages simply to capture many of the important factors affecting decisions in this campaign." Barnard concluded, "a very playable, and seemingly realistic, game." Vasey concluded, "I would question the weighting of some of the rules, but overall it is pretty accurate, and so simple that amendments are easily achieved. A good game."

In his 1977 book The Comprehensive Guide to Board Wargaming, Nick Palmer commented that "The [Combat Results Table] works well, but attrition by guerrillas is rather tedious." Palmer also thought that the use of the term "strength points" to describe a unit's combat ability reduced the "period glamour" normally associated with Napoleonic wargames. Palmer concluded, "Smooth game system but lacking in flavour and fun."

In Issue 52 of Moves, Ian Chadwick thought the area map "proves quite playable" but found the game graphics and counters "drab and colorless. This is unfortunate, because the game plays well and can be enjoyed for its play otherwise." Chadwick concluded, "This is a simple, not a simplistic game. It captures much of the period's flavour, even if combat does not reflect Napoleonic principles."

== Reviews ==
- Battle Plan V1 #4
- Paper Wars #19
- Strategy & Tactics #55
