= Pearl Harbor (wargame) =

WWII board wargame

- 1st edition rulebook cover (1977); Art by Rodger B. MacGowan
- Designers: John Prados
- Illustrators: Rich Banner, Richard Hentz, Rodger B. MacGowan
- Publishers: Simulations Publications Inc.
- Publication: 1977
- Genres: World War II

Pearl Harbor, subtitled "The War Against Japan, 1941–1945", is a board wargame published by Game Designers' Workshop (GDW) in 1977. Despite the title, the game simulates the entire Pacific Theater of World War II, not just the attack on Pearl Harbor. Serious issues with the rules surfaced after the game was published, and a much-improved second edition was released in 1979.

== Description ==
Pearl Harbor is a strategic-level board wargame for between two and seven players in which one side controls American and allied forces (air, ground, and naval units), and the other side controls Japanese forces. With 840 counters, a large map and over 20 pages of rules, the game has been characterized as complex.

=== Gameplay ===
Each side's turn is divided into five segments:

- Decision: how to spend Economic Resource Points
- Movement by active player
- Reaction movement by non-active player
- Combat by both sides
- Return to base, reorganization and expenditure of Economic Resource Points to build new units

The addition of optional rules can add as many as 34 separate functions to one side's turn. When both sides have completed their turn, this represents three months of game time.

=== Movement ===
Naval units may only travel via water; air units can fly a given distance while on combat missions, but may extend that range if transferring between bases. Most land units must be transported from island to island by naval units, but marine units can "island hop" amphibiously by themselves.

=== Combat ===
Each nationality in the game may make up to six attacks per turn of any kind. The exceptions are the navies and armies of Japan and the United States, which each may make six attacks per turn.

=== Supply ===
Units must be able to trace an unhindered line back to a base, and from there back to the unit's national capital. If a nation's capital city is captured, that nation's units are removed from the game. Critic Eric Goldberg thought this was a flawed rule that might lead to a non-historical strategy where "one side may extend itself to capture another's home base, crippling the latter's efforts when successful."

=== Economic system ===
To bring a new unit onto the board, it must be "built" using Economic Resource Points (ERPs). Each side receives a pool of ERPs each turn by controlling cities that have an ERP value. For example, Canton has an ERP value of 5 while Manila is only worth 1 ERP. Land and air units that have been destroyed and naval units that have been damaged but are still afloat can be returned to the player's counter reserve pool for repair and reassignment, but naval units that have been sunk are lost.

Players can also use ERPs for other functions in the game such as buying more attacks per turn, and turning some of their units into reaction forces capable of counter-attacking during the other player's turn.

=== Optional rules ===
There are a large number of optional rules, including Chinese guerrillas, who steal ERPs from the Japanese; "Banzai!", which allows the Japanese player to change a "no effect" result to an exchange of casualties; "The War in Europe", which gives German units to the Japanese player; use of the atomic bomb by the American player; and "Asia for the Asians", which allows the Japanese player to recruit extra units from other parts of Asia.

=== Scenarios ===
The game comes with two scenarios:

- December 1941 to November 1941
- December 1943 to August 1945

There is also a campaign game that covers the entire war from December 1941 to August 1945.

Box cover of 2nd edition, 1979, with art by Richard Hentz

== Publication history ==
In 1974, John Prados designed the board wargame Rise and Decline of the Third Reich, which was published by Avalon Hill and became very popular. Prados returned to Avalon Hill with a similar game set in the Pacific, but the game company turned him down. Prados subsequently sold Pearl Harbor to GDW. However, during game development, GDW changed many of Prados's original rules. When it was published in 1977 as a ziplock bag game with cover art by Rodger B. MacGowan, major issues surfaced. Eric Goldberg called the rules "an unfathomable mess". GDW rushed out a set of errata to try and fix some of the problems, but also assigned Marc Miller to redevelop the rules. The resultant second edition, released as a boxed set in 1979 with cover art by Richard Hentz, was praised as a much improved product.

== Reception ==
In Issue 37 of Dragon, Bryan Beecher did not like the map design, which included several tables and charts, as well as holding areas for each player's ERPs and force pools. Beecher pointed out that "Players cannot sit by their respective countries and still reach their force pools without getting up and moving. GDW should have either made a separate ERP and force pool card for each player, similar to Avalon Hill's Third Reich, or put the force pool adjacent to or near its respective country." Beecher also warned, "The game is complex and can be slow-moving," but called the multi-player rules "very good." Beecher thought the optional rules were the best part of the game, and recommended several. Beecher concluded, "Pearl Harbor is a quality game and I highly recommend it."

In Issue 50 of Moves, Eric Goldberg outlined the history of the 1st edition and 2nd editions of the game, analyzed the rules and concluded, "The second edition of Pearl Harbor is what the first edition should have been. As a game, it is eminently playable, and good fun when several players divide the nationalities. As a simulation, it is a new look at an important war and an imaginative combination of old and new mechanics."
