= Legion: Tactical Warfare in the Roman Age, 100BC-700AD =

Board wargame published in 1975

Legion: Tactical Warfare in the Roman Age, 100BC-700AD is a board wargame published by Simulations Publications, Inc. (SPI) in 1975 that simulates battles involving Roman legions against a variety of historical foes. Originally published by SPI as Centurion, the game was revised and republished with the title Legion as part of a series called PRESTAGS ("Pre-Seventeenth Century Tactical Game System").

== Description ==
Legion is a two-player tactical board wargame in which one player controls Roman legions, and the other player controls one of Rome's historic enemies during the period 100 BC to 700 AD, including barbarian hordes, Carthaginians, and rebel legions. Twenty scenarios are outlined, including the battles of Carrhae, Pharsalus, Teutoburger Wald, Placentia, and Adrianople.

The game system used by all games of the PRESTAGS series is a simple "I Go, You Go" system of alternating turns where one player moves and fires, followed by the other player. More complexity can be added by using optional rules for panic, leadership, facing, melee and simultaneous movement.

In addition to the PRESTAGS rules, Legion also has rules unique to the Roman era, including the ability of Roman legions to form a testudo formation that, unlike other formations in the game, is not vulnerable to a flank attack.

== Publication history ==
In 1971, Albert Nofi designed a game about historic battles during the Roman period that was published by SPI in Issue 25 of Strategy & Tactics as a free pull-out game titled Centurion. Over the next three years, SPI published other similar games set in ancient and medieval eras. In 1975, SPI decided to gather five of these disparate games together under the name PRESTAGS ("Pre-Seventeenth Century Tactical Game System"), and tasked John Young with creating a single set of rules that all the PRESTAGS games would use. One of the games converted to the new system was Centurion, retitled Legion. (The other PRESTAGS games are Chariot, Spartan, Viking, and Yeoman.)

Legion immediately moved into SPI's Top Ten Bestseller List, debuting at #5 as soon as it was published; it stayed in the Top Ten for four months.

== Reception ==
In a 1976 poll conducted by SPI to determine the most popular board wargames in North America, Legion placed a very respectable 44th out of 202 games.}

In the January 1976 edition of Airfix Magazine, Bruce Quarrie noted "the game well illustrates the splendid discipline of the Roman army at its highpoint." He concluded, "In general [...] the result is as SPI intended, to satisfy both those who desire a simple format and those who can assimilate relatively complex restrictions."

In Issue 15 of Battlefield, B.M. Sarnoff compared Legion to its predecessor, Centurion, and wrote, "While Legion is quite an improvement in most aspects, a few optional rules were lost in the process of transforming Legion to the PRESTAG mold." Sarnoff suggested reintegrating these rules into Legion, especially the "Roman Relief" rule (exhausted Roman units can be exchanged for fresher reserves); and the construction of earthworks on the battlefield.

In his 1977 book The Comprehensive Guide to Board Wargaming, Nick Palmer noted that the map was "mostly nondescript, with great expanses of clear terrain and a few hills, rivers and other features dotted about. [...] the anonymous map inhibits the usual wargames enjoyment of refighting a particular battle." However, he admitted that the function of the game, "tactical clashes with a simple basic system, is well achieved." He also suggested that those looking for another take on the Roman period consider Caesar's Legions by Avalon Hill, published the same year as Legion.

In the 1980 book The Complete Book of Wargames, game designer Jon Freeman called the PRESTAGS system "a marvelous, if colorless, way to introduce people to wargaming and the early historical periods." He was disappointed that "Neither the maps or counters have historical designations. [...] one battle has little to distinguish it from another." He also questioned how the historicity of any battle was maintained, since, "because of counter-mix limitations and the generalized nature of the system, many of the orders of battle for individual scenarios are warped or downright inaccurate." He concluded by giving the game an Overall Evaluation of "Good", saying, "The system is clean, and most battles can be played in a short time. If you are not too concerned with the limitations of the system, the variety of scenarios makes each game a bargain."

In The Guide to Simulations/Games for Education and Training, Martin Campion approved the revisions from Centurion to Legion, noting, "The rules have been simplified and generally improved, although some options have been lost in the process, mainly the ability to use field fortifications."

== Other reviews and commentary ==
- Fire & Movement #71
