= Von Manstein: Battles for the Ukraine =

1975 WWII board wargame

Cover of RGA edition, 1975

Von Manstein: Battles for the Ukraine is a board wargame published by Rand Game Associates (RGA) in 1975 that simulates combat in southern Russia and Ukraine during World War II. A revised and expanded version titled Panzerkrieg was released by Operational Studies Group in 1978, and then by Avalon Hill in 1984.

== Background ==
In June 1941, Germany launched Operation Barbarossa, a surprise invasion of the Soviet Union. In the central sector, Army Group Center had been given the strategic goal of capturing Moscow. This abruptly changed in late August 1941 when Adolf Hitler ordered substantial parts of Army Group Center to move south to aid in an encirclement of Soviet forces near Kiev. This marked the start of three years of intense conflict in Ukraine.

== Description ==
Von Manstein: Battles for the Ukraine is a two-player board wargame in which one player controls Axis forces and the other player controls Soviet forces.

=== Components ===
The game comes with 200 double-sided counters. To reduce printing costs, the obverse and reverse of each counter represent two different units (each one used different scenarios). Even though this has the effect of doubling the number of counters to 400, the game's designer, John Prados, acknowledged that some of the units historically present at the game's battles are not represented.

=== Gameplay ===
The game uses an alternating "I Go, You Go" series of turns similar to that used in SPI's Panzergruppe Guderian. Specifically, the first player has the following phases:

- Determine supply status of units
- Movement
- Combat
- Exploitation: Mechanized units that did not attack during the Combat phase, and are adjacent to enemy units, may move again and attack.

The second player then has the same phases, which completes one game turn, representing one week of the battle.

Only mechanized units have zones of control. Thus enemy units do not have to stop while passing by infantry units. Combat is voluntary — a unit adjacent to an enemy unit does not have to attack.

Leaders can play an important part in combat, matching the strength of the units they are stacked with and adding a bonus to combat die rolls.

During combat, the defender may move reserve units from nearby Headquarters into the fray to balance the odds.

There are a number of optional rules which add more realism, but at the cost of increased complexity: Amphibious Invasion, Soviet Paratroops, Soviet Tactical Mobility, German Replacements, and Air Supply.

=== Scenarios ===
The game comes with eight scenarios:

1. Kiev Pocket, 27 September to 10 October 1941 (7 turns)
2. Soviet Winter Counteroffensive, 14 January to 31 March 1942 (12 turns)
3. Operation Blue: The 1942 German Offensive, 28 June to 14 September 1942 (11 turns)
4. Entombment of the Sixth Army: The Stalingrad Scenario, 19 November 1942 to 5 February 1943 (12 turns)
5. The Backhand Blow, 15 February to 29 March 1943 (6 turns)
6. Aftermath of Zitadelle, 2 August to 3 October 1943 (8 turns)
7. Battle for the Dnepr, 9 October to 25 December 1943 (10 turns)
8. Korsun-Cherkassy and the Fourth Panzer Army Episode, 1 February to 31 March 1944 (8 turns)

Avalon Hill's 1984 edition of Panzerkrieg with artwork by Rodger B. MacGowan

== Publication history ==
Von Manstein was designed by John Prados, with help from Vincent Cumbo and Albert Nofi, and was published by RGA in 1975 as the first game in their "Military Time Capsule Series of Games." In a 1976 poll conducted by Simulations Publications Inc. to determine the most popular board wargames in North America, Von Manstein placed 65th out of 202 games, the highest rating for any RGA game.

In 1978, Operational Studies Group published a revised, expanded and more complex version titled Panzerkrieg: von Manstein & HeeresGruppe Süd. The rights to the game were purchased by Avalon Hill, which re-released Panzerkrieg in 1983 with cover art by Rodger B. MacGowan.

A further revised edition was published by CoSi Games in 1994.

== Reception ==
In his 1977 book The Comprehensive Guide to Board Wargaming, Nick Palmer called this game "Exciting and highly playable."

In Issue 32 of Moves, Russ Smith commented "The overall effect of the three operating systems [movement, combat and supply] places heavy emphasis on narrow, high-speed drives toward river crossing points and encirclements, using tanks, mech infantry, air, and crack leaders on attack." However, Smith noted that this was not the historical experience in Ukraine, and concluded, "Rand has simulated blitzkrieg at the grand tactical scale, but has a poor historical simulation in von Manstein: Battles in the Ukraine."

In Issue 50 of Moves, Steve List reviewed Panzerkrieg, OSG's expanded version of Von Manstein, and noted "The game has many virtues, but many flaws as well; these can be traced to some production shortcuts and OSG's traditional casual approach to rules writing." List concluded by giving the game a grade of B−, saying, "All in all, a good game, but only if one works at learning it."

In Issue 39 of the British wargaming magazine Perfidious Albion, Doug Ryder reviewed Panzerkrieg and commented, "This may seem to be pretty standard WWII East Front stuff, in some ways it is, but I feel this is one game that will prove very popular. The system is easily learnt, plays very well and makes for a good game generally."

== Awards ==
At the 1976 Origins Awards, Von Manstein was a finalist for the Charles S. Roberts Award for Best Professional Game of 1975.

== Other reviews and commentary ==
- Battleplan #3
- Fire & Movement #1
- The Wargamer Vol.1 #10
- Strategy & Tactics #41
