= David Syrett =

David Syrett (January 8, 1939 – October 18, 2004) was an American academic who was Distinguished Professor of History at Queens College, City University of New York in Flushing, New York, and a researcher and documentary editor on eighteenth-century British naval history and the Battle of the Atlantic during World War Two. He taught at Queens College from 1966 until he died in 2004.

== Early life and education ==
David Syrett "was part of a family of historians." His father Harold Syrett and his brother John Syrett were also historians. His influential father, the well-known historian of the early American republic, was the editor of the Papers of Alexander Hamilton. David Syrett's second wife, Elena Frangakis-Syrett, specialized in economic history. He was born in White Plains, New York and graduated from Columbia University in 1961. After completing his M.A. at Columbia in 1964, he earned his doctorate at the University of London in 1966. David Syrett's doctoral dissertation was entitled Shipping and the American War.

== Academic affiliations ==
New York Military Affairs Symposium, President, 1990–2004

== Published works ==
- Shipping and the American war, 1775-83 : a study of British transport organization (1970)
- The siege and capture of Havana, 1762 (1970)
- The Lost war: letters from British officers during the American Revolution edited and annotated by Marion Balderston and David Syrett; introduction by Henry Steele Commager (1975)
- The Royal Navy in American waters 1775-1783 (1989)
- The commissioned sea officers of the Royal Navy, 1660-1815, edited by David Syrett and R.L. DiNardo (1994)
- The defeat of the German U-boats: the battle of the Atlantic (1994)
- The battle of the Atlantic and signals intelligence : U-boat situations and trends, 1941-1945 (1998)
- The Royal Navy in European waters during the American Revolutionary War (1998)
- "The Raising of American Troops for Service in the West Indies during the War of Austrian Succession, 1740-1", Historical Research Vol. 73, No. 180 (February 2000), pp. 20–32.
- The Battle of the Atlantic and signals intelligence : U-boat tracking papers, 1941-1947 (2002)
- The Rodney papers: selections from the correspondence of Admiral Lord Rodney (2005, 2007)
- Admiral Lord Howe: A Biography (2006)
- Shipping and Military Power in the Seven Years' War: The Sails of Victory (2007)

== Sources and references ==
- Obituary, The Independent (London), 19 January 2005, p. 35
- Obituary, New York Times, 23 October 2004, p. A18

Specific
