= Spartan (video game) =

2004 video game

Spartan: Blood and War
- Developer(s): Slitherine Strategies
- Publisher(s): EU: Just Play; NA: Graphsim Entertainment
- Composer(s): Iain Stevens; David Reeks
- Platform(s): Windows
- Release: FRA: 24 March 2004; UK: 21 May 2004; NA: 25 May 2004
- Genre(s): Turn-based strategy
- Mode(s): Single-player

Spartan is a turn-based strategy game developed by Slitherine Strategies in 2004. The game is set in ancient Greece and Asia Minor. Spartan is a turn-based game; however, when armies encounter each other in battle the game switches to real time combat available in both 2D and 3D visuals. Most reviewers were positive about the extent of simulated real history present in the game but were critical of how timid the AI is which hampered the playing experience.

== Gameplay ==
=== Tactical game ===
The player deploys their forces behind a start line, usually with the benefit of some information about the enemy deployment. They are also able to give some limited orders such as hold or advance. When the battle is started the player has very limited control over events - something which was very much the case for generals of the period it depicts. Philip Veale has said that the designers wanted to avoid the game becoming a click race but conceded that though deployment did affect the outcome of battles this was often not apparent to players. The player may sound an attack signal which will cause all troops with a hold order to move to the attack and also the retreat for when all hope is lost. Winning battles is then a question of anticipating how the troops are going to behave and so ensuring that when the troops clash it is in a way favorable to you.

=== Strategic game ===
The player controls a faction picked from a massive selection, which may be Greek (such as Athens or Thessaly), tribal (such as Thracian Asti), or some Eastern (such as the Lydians or Mysians). All factions have a different number of cities to conquer and specific victory conditions to win each with their own special unique buildings and units.

Resources play a role in the game economy. There are number of resources, and they are not available to all cities; trade allows for imports and exports. Silver is used as currency, in trade, and to pay soldiers. All cities will produce some silver (through taxes, etc.), but only a few have the ability to have silver mines constructed. Food is needed to feed the population, but only a few areas have enough farmland to feed a larger faction (small factions can get by simply importing the necessary food, larger factions may find the cost too large unless they have at least some cities that can produce food). Bricks are used for construction of most buildings, as well as their upkeep. Other resources are used for training warriors or the construction of advanced buildings.

Diplomacy is carried out by sending the limited number of diplomats to whatever factions one deem they would be most useful to influence where they can be given various orders, ranging from those beneficial to the players relations with that faction like seeking asylia for merchants or gifting horses, or actions that hurt them, or just recalling them to send them somewhere else. If the enemy dislike the players actions they may decide to expel or kill the player's diplomat (and the player may do likewise to any diplomats the other factions might have in the player's lands). If a diplomat is lost, a new one will be gained, but that diplomat will not have whatever experience the old diplomat might have gained.

== Expansion ==
An expansion pack, Gates of Troy was released on December 6, 2004. It adds six missions, 17 heroes, and 12 units. The release of the expansion was delayed when a postal carrier delivering the master disc from a duplication plant was assaulted and his bags taken.

== Reception ==
Reception

Aggregate score
Aggregator	Score
Metacritic	56/100

Review score
Publication	Score
IGN	5.0/10

At its release the game was praised for its extent of simulated real history and a large replay value but they gave negative thoughts about the games AI because of how timid it was.
