= John Prados =

American author and historian (1951–2022)

- Prados in 2009
- Born: January 9, 1951; New York City, U.S.
- Died: November 29, 2022 (aged 71); Silver Spring, Maryland, U.S.
- Education: Columbia University (BA, MA, PhD)
- Occupations: Historian; writer; game designer
- Spouse: Jill Gay
- Children: 2
- Writing career
- Genres: Military history; world history; international relations
- Notable works: Rise and Decline of the Third Reich (1974); Spies! (1981)
- Notable awards: Charles S. Roberts Award; Arthur Goodzeit Book Award
- Website: johnprados.com

John Frederick Prados (January 9, 1951 – November 29, 2022) was an American author, historian, and wargame designer who specialized in the history of World War II, the Vietnam War, and current international relations.

== Early life and education ==
Prados was born in Queens, New York on January 9, 1951. His father, Jose Prados-Herrero, moved the family to San Juan, Puerto Rico, where John graduated from high school. He returned to New York to attend university, and received a B.A. (1973), an M.A. in 1975 and a Ph.D. (1982) from Columbia University, all in political science with an emphasis on international relations. His doctoral thesis about the successes and failures of American intelligence assessments of Soviet military power, "The Soviet Estimate: U.S. Intelligence Analysis and Soviet Strategic Forces," became his first book.

== Scholarly career ==
After graduation, Prados became an independent scholar who used the 1967 Freedom of Information Act to access government documents. This often required carefully perusing boxes of documents to find nuggets of essential information. Prados's ability to ferret out revelations that were sometimes an embarrassment to the American government was noted by one official, who predicted in 2011 that if the government redacted the Pentagon Papers, Prados would "likely scope out the 'declassified' page very quickly" and "parade this discovery like a politician on the 4th of July." The Washington Post noted that Prados's books "broadened and sometimes challenged the known history of World War II, the Vietnam War, the Cold War and the CIA." He told The New York Times in 1993 that his devotion to this work was because "the American people not only have a need but a right to know their history."

Prados collaborated with the National Security Archive for many years as an independent scholar, then joined as a senior fellow in 1997, where he led its Intelligence Documentation Project and its Vietnam Project.

Prados wrote over 20 books, as well as articles and book reviews for Vanity Fair, Scientific American, Naval History, the Journal of American History, Diplomatic History, Intelligence and National Security, Naval Institute Proceedings, The Journal of National Security Law & Policy, The Bulletin of the Atomic Scientists, the Journal of East-West Studies, Survival, The New York Times, the Los Angeles Times, The Washington Post, and The Boston Globe.

== Wargame designer ==
During high school, Prados started to play board wargames, and while at university, he expressed his interest in World War II and the Vietnam War by designing wargames. His first, in 1972, a collaboration with Jim Dunnigan titled Year of the Rat: Vietnam, 1972, was a simulation of the Easter Offensive in Vietnam that had happened only weeks before. His second game, Rise and Decline of the Third Reich, earned him critical acclaim, with reviewers calling it "an innovative and challenging game which allows a player to experience the complexity of events in a total war" and "a refreshing change from the sometimes hackneyed design features of many modern wargames." Third Reich won the "Charlie"—the Charles S. Roberts Award—for "Best Professional Game of 1974" and also became the focus of Chilean author Roberto Bolaño's novel El Tercer Reich (The Third Reich). Prados designed another eleven games while at university, and two of them were finalists for a "Charlie"; Von Manstein: Battles for the Ukraine (1975) and Spies! (1981)

Prados continued to design wargames for the rest of his life; the final one, Monty's D-Day, was published the year before his death. Of the more than twenty wargames created after university, ten were nominated for a "Charlie", and three of those were winners: Khe Sahn, 1968 (2002), Fortress Berlin (2004), and Beyond Waterloo (2012). Prados was also awarded a "Robbie" for "Best Game Review or Game Analysis of 2007" for his article "The Evolution of Cards and Wargames" that appeared in Issue 19 of Against the Odds.

As reported in the Washington Post, Prados's purpose in designing wargames was not to breed militarism, but to reveal "the difficulty of conducting war" as well as its "horrendous costs." An active member of Vietnam Veterans Against the War, he combined, according to his partner Ellen Pinzur, "an avid enjoyment of wargaming" with "a loathing of war itself."

== Personal life and death ==
In 2000 Ellen Pinzur moved from Boston to Silver Spring, Maryland to live with Prados; they remained a couple until his death from cancer on November 29, 2022, at age 71. He is survived by his partner, his daughters, his brother, Joe, and his sister Mary.

== Literary awards ==
Combined Fleet Decoded was named by New York Military Affairs Symposium as the recipient of The Arthur Goodzeit Book Award in 1995. Combined Fleet Decoded was also named a Notable Naval Book of the Year by the United States Naval Institute.

Valley of Decision: The Siege of Khe Sanh written with Ray W. Stubbe was named "Notable Naval Book of the Year" by the United States Naval Institute in 1991.

== Charles S. Robert Awards ==
List of Charles S. Robert Awards for excellence in historical wargaming:

- "Best Professional Game of 1974": Rise and Decline of the Third Reich
- "Best Post–World War Two or Modern Game of 2002": Khe Sahn, 1968
- "Best Magazine Game of 2004": Fortress Berlin
- "Best Game Review or Game Analysis of 2007": "The Evolution of Cards and Wargames" in Against the Odds #19
- "Best Magazine Game of 2012": Beyond Waterloo

== Selected works ==
=== Books ===
- The Soviet Estimate: U.S. Intelligence Analysis and Russian Military Strength. New York: Dial Press (1982).
- The Sky Would Fall: Operation Vulture: The U.S. Bombing Mission in Indochina, 1954. New York: Dial Press (1983).
- Presidents' Secret Wars: CIA and Pentagon Covert Operations from World War II Through the Persian Gulf. New York: William Morrow (1986). ISBN 978-0688053840. OCLC 1020700001.
- Pentagon Games: Wargames and the American Military. New York: Harper & Row (1997).
- Keepers of the Keys: A History of the National Security Council from Truman to Bush. New York: Morrow (1991). ISBN 978-0688073978. OCLC 1020691200.
- Valley of Decision: The Siege of Khe Sanh, with Ray W. Stubbe. Boston: Houghton Mifflin (1991). ISBN 0395550033. OCLC 24068862.
- Combined Fleet Decoded: The Secret History of American Intelligence and the Japanese Navy in World War II. New York: Random House (1995). ISBN 0679437010. OCLC 30544409.
- The Blood Road: The Ho Chi Minh Trail and the Vietnam War. New York: Wiley (1999). ISBN 0471254657. OCLC 38199521.
- The White House Tapes: Eavesdropping on the President (as Editor). New York: The New Press with W. W. Norton. ISBN 1565848527. OCLC 1195475771.
- Lost Crusader: The Secret Wars of CIA Director William Colby. New York: Oxford University Press (2003). ISBN 0195128478. OCLC 49493468.
- Inside the Pentagon Papers, with Margaret Pratt. Lawrence, Kan.: University Press of Kansas (2004). ISBN 0700613250. OCLC 54279988.
- Hoodwinked: The Documents That Reveal How Bush Sold Us a War. New York: The New Press (2004). ISBN 978-1565849020. OCLC 54775830.
- Safe for Democracy: The Secret Wars of the CIA. Chicago: Ivan R. Dee (2006). ISBN 1566635748. OCLC 64591926.
- Vietnam: The History of an Unwinnable War, 1945–1975. University Press of Kansas. ISBN 978-0700616343. OCLC 276995742.
- Normandy Crucible: The Decisive Battle That Shaped World War II in Europe. New York: NAL Caliber (2011). ISBN 978-0451233837. OCLC 679930937.
- In Country: Remembering the Vietnam War. Lanham, MD: Ivan R. Dee (2011). ISBN 978-1566638685. OCLC 681502179.
- — (15 September 2013). The Family Jewels: The CIA, Secrecy, and Presidential Power. Discovering America (Book 7 of 9) (First ed.). Austin: University of Texas Press. doi:10.7560/737624. ISBN 978-0292737624. LCCN 2013004240. OCLC 841187512. OL 27150612M – via Internet Archive.
- Storm Over Leyte: The Philippine Invasion and the Destruction of the Japanese Navy. New York: NAL Caliber (2016). ISBN 978-0451473615. OCLC 930786579.
- The Ghosts of Langley: Into the CIA's Heart of Darkness. The New Press (2017). ISBN 978-1620970881. OCLC 974700011.

=== Book reviews ===
- Review of Wild Bill and Intrepid, by Thomas F. Troy. American Historical Review (Oct. 1997), p. 1251.
- Review of No End to War, by Walter Laqueur. Political Science Quarterly (Mar. 2004), p. 184.

=== Book contributions ===
- "The War Scare of 1983". In: The Cold War: A Military History. New York: Random House (2006). pp. 438–39. ISBN 978-0812967166.

=== Wargames ===
The following are the board wargames designed by John Prados.

- Year of the Rat: Vietnam, 1972 (with Jim Dunnigan, Simulations Publications Inc. (SPI), 1972)
- Rise and Decline of the Third Reich (Avalon Hill (AH), 1974)
- Wellington in the Peninsula (with Vincent Cumbo and Albert Nofi, Rand Game Associates (RGA), 1975)
- Von Manstein: Battles for the Ukraine 1941–1944 (with Vincent Cumbo and Albert Nofi, RGA, 1975)
- Vicksburg: the War for the West (with Vincent Cumbo and Albert Nofi, RGA, 1975)
- The Great War 1914–1918 (with Albert Nofi, RGA, 1976)
- Salerno: Operation Avalanche (with Vincent Cumbo and Albert Nofi, West End Games (WEG), 1977)
- Pearl Harbor: The War Against Japan, 1941-1945 (Game Designers' Workshop (GDW), 1977)
- Panzerkrieg: von Manstein & HeeresGruppe Süd (Operational Studies Group (OSG), 1978)
- The Battle for Cassino: Assaulting the Gustav Line, 1944 (SPI, 1978)
- Campaigns of Napoleon (WEG, 1980)
- Spies! (SPI, 1981)
- Kanev: Parachutes Across the Dnepr, September 23–26, 1943 (World Wide Wargames (3W), 1981)
- Cold War (Victory Games, 1984)
- Monty's D-Day (TSR, 1985)
- Warsaw Rising: Revolt of the Polish Underground, 1944 (TSR, 1986)
- Pentagon Games (Harper & Row, 1987)
- The Campaigns of Robert E. Lee (Clash of Arms Games (CoA), 1988)
- Bodyguard Overlord (Spearhead Games, 1994)
- Crisis: Sinai 1973 (GMT Games, 1995)
- The Army of the Heartland: The Army of Tennessee's Campaigns, 1861–1863 (CoA, 1996)
- Khe Sanh, 1968 (Against the Odds (AtO), 2002)
- On to Berlin (with C. Rawling, LPS, 2004)
- Fortress Berlin (AtO, 2004)
- Toppling the Reich: The Battles for the Westwall (AtO, 2006)
- Look Away! (with Paul Rohrbaugh, AtO, 2007)
- Tide of Iron: Designer Series Vol. 1 (Fantasy Flight Games (FFG), 2008)
- Four Roads to Moscow (with Roger Nord, Ted Raicer, and Michael Rinella, AtO, 2011)
- Bradley's D-Day (with Lembit Tohver, Ato, 2011)
- Beyond Waterloo (with Lembit Tohver, Ato, 2012)
- Beyond Leipzig: Conflict of Nations (Last Stand Games, 2013)
- The Victory of Arminius: Teutoburg Forest, IX AD (Turning Point Simulations, 2015)
- Set Europe Ablaze: The Resistance War 1939–1945 (AtO, 2015)
- The Seeds of Disaster (AtO, 2015)
- Four Roads to Paris (with Steven Cunliffe, Roger Nord, and Michael Rinella, AtO, 2017)
- Monty's D-Day (AtO, 2021)
