= Albert Nofi =

American military historian (born 1944)

Albert A. Nofi
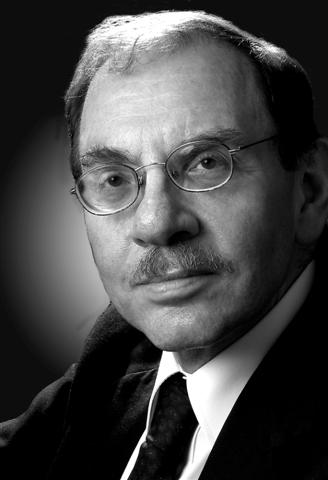
- Al Nofi presentation at New York Military Affairs Symposium
- Born: January 6, 1944 (age 82); Brooklyn, New York, United States
- Occupation: Historian; Game developer Educator
- Writing career
- Subject: Military History

Albert A. Nofi (born January 6, 1944), is an American military historian, defense analyst, and designer of board and computer wargaming systems.

== Early life ==
A native of Brooklyn, he attended New York City public schools, graduating from the Boys' High School (now Boys and Girls High School) in 1961. Nofi attended Fordham University, earning a bachelor's (1965) and a master's (1967), and then received a Ph.D. in Military History from the City University of New York (1991).

== Career ==
From 1965 through 1995, Nofi was a teacher and later administrator in the New York City public schools. Working primarily in alternative programs, such as the Harlem Preparatory School, Park East High School, and Unity High School at the Door, he retired as an assistant principal in 1995.

During this period he also built a parallel career as an independent historian, defense analyst, and wargame designer, working primarily with James F. Dunnigan, Redmond A. Simonsen, and David C. Isby at Simulations Publications (SPI). As research director for SPI and associate editor of the military historical simulations journal Strategy and Tactics for over a decade (1969–1982), he produced numerous articles and a number of wargames. Nofi also designed the strategic wargame Imperium Romanum set in the Roman Empire, originally published by in 1979 West End Games.

In addition to work for SPI, Nofi has authored, co-authored, or edited over 30 books on a wide variety of topics. Among his collaborators are Dunnigan, Bela Kiraly, R. L. DiNardo, Kathleen Broome Williams, and others.

In 1999 Nofi became a research analyst with the Center for Naval Analyses (CNA), in Alexandria, Virginia, where he worked with game theorist Peter P. Perla. Nofi was the CNA field representative to the Chief of Naval Operations Strategic Studies Group, in Newport, Rhode Island, from 2001 until mid-2005, before returning to CNA. While at CNA he wrote "Recent Trends in Thinking About Warfare" and several other analytical papers. He retired from CNA at the end of 2006.

Nofi has lectured at the University of Paris-Sorbonne, the Smithsonian Institution, the Library and Archives Canada, the Admiral Nimitz State Historic Site (home of the National Museum of the Pacific War), the Air War College, the Command and Staff College of the Marine Corps University, a number of other colleges and universities, and numerous Civil War Round Tables and local historical societies.

For many years an Associate Fellow of the U.S. Civil War Center, a Director of the New York Military Affairs Symposium since its formation, a member of the Society for Military History and a number of other military and historical societies, Nofi is also a founding member of the Italian American Italian Studies Association, of which he was corresponding secretary for several years.

Since 1997, Nofi has contributed a regular column to North & South magazine. In 1998, he became a contributing editor to StrategyPage, for which he writes a regular column.

In 2011 Nofi's book To Train the Fleet for War: The U.S. Navy's Fleet Problems, 1923-1940 (see review) was awarded the John Lyman Book Award in Navy History by the North American Society for Oceanic History and given "Honorable Mention" by The New York Chapter of the Navy League of the United States for its Theodore and Franklin D. Roosevelt Prize in Naval History. To Train the Fleet for War discusses the US Navy's interwar Fleet Problems - large-scale real-world wargames played by the majority of the US Navy every year from 1923 to 1940 - in detail, both cataloguing each individual problem and describing the overall nature and evolution of the wargames over their 17 years of existence.

== Select bibliography ==
- (1992) The Alamo and the Texas War of Independence, September 30, 1835, to April 21, 1836: Heroes, Myths, and History, Conshohocken, PA: Combined Books, Inc., ISBN 0-938289-10-1
- (1992) The Civil War Notebook, Perseus Books Group.
- (1993) The Waterloo Campaign: June 1815. USA: Da Capo Press. ISBN 0-938289-98-5
- (1994) Gettysburg Campaign June–July 1863, Perseus Books Group.
- (1995) A Civil War Treasury, Perseus Books Group.
- (1995) The War Against Hitler, Perseus Books Group.
- (1996) The Spanish–American War. Conshohocken, Pennsylvania: Combined Books Inc., 1996. ISBN 0-938289-57-8.
- (1997) Marine Corps Book Of Lists, Perseus Books Group.
- (2010) "To Train the Fleet for War": The U.S. Navy Fleet Problems, 1923-1940, Newport, RI: Naval War College Press.
- (2017) The Blue and Gray Almanac, Casemate Publishers.

In Collaboration with Jim Dunnigan:

- (1991) Shooting Blanks: War Making That Doesn't Work, ISBN 0-688-08947-X.
- (1994) Medieval Life and the Hundred Years War, available online
- (1994) Dirty Little Secrets of World War II: Military Information No One Told You About the Greatest, Most Terrible War in History, William Morrow & Company. ISBN 0-688-12235-3.
- (1995) Victory at Sea: World War II in the Pacific, William Morrow & Company, 1995. ISBN 0-688-14947-2.
- (1998) The Pacific War Encyclopedia, Facts on File, 1998. ISBN 0-8160-3439-7.
- (1999) Dirty Little Secrets: American Military Information You're Not Supposed to Know, St. Martins Press, ISBN 0-312-19857-4.
- (2001) Victory and Deceit: Deception and Trickery at War, 2nd edition, Writers Club Press, ISBN 0-595-18405-7.
- (2001) Dirty Little Secrets of the Vietnam War: Military Information You're Not Supposed to Know, St. Martins Griffin, ISBN 0-312-25282-X.

Other collaborations

- (1986) War and Society in East Central Europe in the Era of World War I, edited with Béla Király and Nandor Dreisziger. Atlantic Research and Publications/Columbia University Press.
- (1988) East Central European War Leaders, Civil and Military, 1740-1920, edited with Bela K. Kiraly. Atlantic Research and Publications/Columbia University Press.
- (1993) The Civil War Book of Lists, edited with John Cannon, Ken Gallagher, and David G. Martin. Combined Publishing.
- (1998) James Longstreet, the Man, the Soldier, the Controversy, edited with Richard L. DiNardo. Combined Publishing.

== Games ==
- Al' Nofi's Imperium Romanum Decision Games, 2018.
- The Great War: 1914-1918. Mission Viejo: One Small Step, 2015.
- Victory at Sea, with James F. Dunnigan. 360-Pacific, 1994.
- The Hundred Years' War, with James F. Dunnigan. StrategyWorld, 1992.
- Man-at-Arms, with James F. Dunnigan. Cambria, Ca: 3W Inc, 1990.
- Imperium Romanum II. New York: West End Games, 1985.
- Sicily: Operation Husky. New York: Rand Game Associates, 1981.
- Knights & Knaves: the Game of Medieval Skullduggery. New York: Nimrod Games, 1979.
- Imperium Romanum. New York: West End Games, 1979.
- The Great War. New York: West End Games, 1978.
- Salerno. New York: West End Games, 1978.
- Caporetto, 1917. New York: Simulations Publications, 1978.
- Wellington in the Peninsula with John Prados and Vincent Cumbo. New York: Rand Game Associates, 1975.
- Vicksburg: The War for the West with John Prados and Vincent Cumbo. New York: Rand Game Associates, 1975.
- Von Manstein: Battles for the Ukraine with John Prados and Vincent Cumbo. New York: Rand Game Associates, 1975.
- Centurion. New York: Simulations Publications, 1971.
- Renaissance of Infantry. New York: Simulations Publications, 1970.
