= Chariot: Tactical Warfare in the Biblical Age, 3000-500 B.C. =

Board wargame

Chariot: Tactical Warfare in the Biblical Age, 3000-500 B.C. is a board wargame published by Simulations Publications Inc. (SPI) in 1975 that simulates various historical battles during the Bronze Age. The game originally started as Armageddon: Tactical Combat, 3000-500 BC, published in 1972, but was revised in order to become the first game in SPI's PRESTAGS collection (Pre-Seventeenth Century Tactical Game System).

== Description ==
Chariot is a relatively simple 2-player wargame that provides simulations of fourteen historical battles during the Bronze Age. Although it has 450 die-cut counters, usually the sign of a more complex game, only some of the counters are used in any given battle.

=== Gameplay ===
Chariot includes fourteen scenarios, and for the most part uses a set of common rules that were developed for all the games in the PRESTAGS series. In addition, various rules unique to Chariot are also included. The game uses a simple alternating "I Go, You Go" system where one player fires ranged weapons, moves and engages in melee combat, and then the other player has the same opportunity. Leader counters play an important role in controlling their armies. There are also optional rules for forward facing (bringing the possibility of flank and rear attacks), panic, and simultaneous movement.

== Publication history ==
In the first years following the formation of SPI, the company produced several board wargames about combat before the invention of gunpowder, each using their own different set of rules. These included Phalanx (Ancient Greece), Centurion (Iron Age), Dark Ages (Medieval), and Armageddon: Tactical Combat, 3000-500 BC (Bronze Age). In 1975, the decision was made to redevelop all of these game using a common set of rules under the banner PRESTAGS (Pre-Seventeenth Century Tactical Game System). Armageddon had been designed by Stephen B. Patrick and John Young. Now Young adapted Armageddon to the PRESTAGS rules. The result, with graphic design by Redmond A. Simonsen, was retitled Chariot, and was the first in the PRESTAGS series to be released. Although it rose to #9 on SPI's Top Ten Bestseller list, the other four games in the PRESTAGS series all sold more copies. Later in 1975, the entire PRESTAGS series was released in one box.

== Reception ==
In the October 1975 issue of Airfix Magazine, Bruce Quarrie thought that the PRESTAGS rules were "worthy of respect", but he found the rules unique to Chariot "a mixture of good and bad." He also questioned why no famous sieges like the Fall of Troy were included in the list of scenarios. He concluded by calling Chariot "quite acceptable. It can even be exciting. It suffers from the uncertainty of SPI in any game based before 1800."

In a 1976 poll conducted by SPI to determine the most popular wargames in North America, Chariot only placed 119th out of 202 games.

In Issue 55 of Strategy & Tactics Jerrold Thomas noted that "A drawback, from the historical standpoint, with any tactical game is that it shows only the moment of battle, with a limited historical scope." However, he concluded that the game "can also add vividness to the reading of history, which can become suddenly more comprehensible when you can actually see just what the opponents had to work with, and what they did with it."

In the inaugural issue of the UK wargaming magazine Phoenix, John Norris said the common set of rules used by all the PRESTAGS games was an advantage, reasoning, "Once you have mastered one game you can probably play the rest of the series without difficulty." However, he also noted a disadvantage to having the same ruleset: "The large common element inevitably reduces the ability of the individual scenarios to reproduce the particular character of the warfare of their periods."

In his 1977 book The Comprehensive Guide to Board Wargaming, Nick Palmer noted the relative unpopularity of Chariot compared to the other PRESTAGS games, commenting, "probably because it is one of the simpler ones, and there is little surviving literature to suggest special features about warfare in the period." He concluded "The function of the [PRESTAGS] series, tactical clashes with a simple basic system, is well achieved, although the anonymous map inhibits the usual wargames enjoyment of refighting a particular battle.

In the 1980 book The Complete Book of Wargames, game designer Jon Freeman found that "Some scenarios are better balanced than others, but there are enough evenly matched battles to satisfy anyone." However, he noted that there was little historical flavor to the game, saying, "One battle has little to distinguish itself from another." He concluded by giving Chariot an Overall Evaluation of "Good", saying, "the system is clean, and most battles can be played in a short time. If you are not too concerned with the limitations of the system, the variety of scenarios makes the game a bargain."

== Other reviews and commentary ==
- Moves #31
- Fire & Movement #22 and #71
- The Wargamer Vol.1 #5
- Jagdpanther #15
- Adventure Gaming Vol.2 #1
- American Wargamer Vol.7 #1
- Paper Wars #63
