= The Complete Book of Wargames =

Book by Jon Freeman

- Author: Jon Freeman
- Publisher: Fireside Books
- Publication date: 1980
- ISBN: 0-671-25374-3
- LC Class: U310.C65

The Complete Book of Wargames by Jon Freeman and the editors of Consumer Guide was published in 1980 by Simon & Schuster under the Fireside imprint.

== Contents ==
This book comes in both a 285-page hardcover edition and a paperback version. In both editions, it is divided into two parts:

- Part 1: "An Introduction to Wargames" takes up about 25% of the book, and is divided into five chapters:
1. Can War Be Fun? A brief history of wargaming, some of the notable companies, and what type of people play wargames.
2. The Nature of the Beast Definitions of wargaming; realism versus playability.
3. All's Not Fair The components of wargames, including hexfields and terrain, the Combat Resolution Table (CRT), the rulebook.
4. Kassala An introductory game to demonstrate the concepts mentioned in the previous three chapters.
5. Playing to Win Victory conditions, reading a CRT, maximizing odds, using terrain, defensive tactics of the hexgrid.
- Part 2: "Evaluating the Games" takes up about three-quarters of the book. Capsule reviews of various games, grouped into seven chapters according to era, from the ancient world to the Second World War. Separate chapters cover modern (post-WWII) warfare, science fiction, fantasy, role-playing, and computer games.

== Reception ==
In the October 1980 edition of The Space Gamer (Issue No. 32), Nick Schuessler questioned the ability of any book to keep up to the then-rapidly growing game industry, saying, "The mercurial aspects of wargaming will probably leave any new publication a bit obsolete the day it's published. Meanwhile, we have an excellent reference work available at (for a change) a reasonable price. Buy and enjoy."

In the February 1981 edition of Dragon (Issue 46), Tony Watson thought the book, although well-written, would be of little value to experienced gamers, although new gamers might find it useful. Watson also felt the book was already out of date only a few months after publication, and commented, "The variety of games available and the rapidity with which they are published has already rendered the topical evaluations obsolete, though they do touch on some of the more important and readily available games in those categories."

In Issue 25 of Games, Jamie Adams liked the way the book started, commenting, "Beginning with a history of wargaming, both as concept and hobby, the book proceeds with a thoughtful analysis of the reasons people play wargames." But Adams noted issues with the book: "Unfortunately, the title is misleading. The Complete Book of Wargames reviews and describes only board wargames — thus ignoring the important part of the hobby devoted to miniatures —and fantasy role-playing games, which are not wargames in any traditional sense. Also, the hobby has been growing so quickly that much of the information is already out of date only a year after publication; for example, no mention is made of Yaquinto Publications, a major company formed after the book was written. Moreover, many of the games reviewed are no longer published by the companies credited with them, and may not be available at all." Nevertheless, Adams concluded on a positive note, saying, "Still, the book remains the most useful guide available both for those already drafted into wargames and for those thinking of enlisting."
