= List of SPI games =

This list of SPI games includes games published by Simulations Publications, Inc. as separate titles, as well as part of their magazines Strategy & Tactics and Ares.

== Games ==
=== 0–9 ===
- 1812: The Campaign of Napoleon in Russia (1972)
- 1914 Revision Kit (Test Series, 1969)
- 1918 (Test Series, 1970 / Second edition, 1972)

=== A ===
- Across Suez (1980)
- A Mighty Fortress (1977)
- Acre: Richard Lionheart's Siege (The Art of Siege quadrigame, 1978)
- After the Holocaust (1977)
- Agincourt (1978)
- Air War (1977)
- The Alamo: Victory in Death (1981)
- Albion: Land of Faerie (Ares #11, 1981)
- Alma: The First Battle (Crimean War quadrigame, 1978)
- The American Civil War: 1861–1865 (S&T #43, 1974)
- The American Revolution: 1775-1783 (1972)
- Antietam: The Bloodiest Day, 17 September 1862 (Blue & Gray quadrigame, 1975)
- Anzio Beachhead (S&T #20, 1969)
- The Ardennes Offensive (1973)
- Arena of Death (Ares #4, 1980)
- Armada: The War With Spain 1585-1604 (S&T #72, 1979)
- Armageddon: Tactical Combat, 3000-500 BC (S&T #34, 1972)
- Arnhem (Westwall quadrigame, 1976)
- The Art of Siege (quadrigame, 1979)
- Atlantic Wall (1978)
- Austerlitz (1973)

=== B ===
- Balaclava: The Charge of the Light Brigade (Crimean War quadrigame, 1978)
- BAOR (S&T #88, 1981)
- Barbarian Kings (Ares #3, 1980)
- Barbarossa: The Russo-German War 1941-45 (Test Series, 1969 / Second edition, 1971)
- Bastogne and the Battle of the Ardennes (S&T #20, 1969)
- Bastogne: The Desperate Defense, December 1944 (Westwall quadrigame, 1976)
- The Battle for Cassino (S&T #71, 1978)
- The Battle for France (S&T #27, 1971)
- Battle for Germany (S&T #50, 1975)
- The Battle for Jerusalem 1967 (Modern Battles II quad, 1977)
- Battle for Stalingrad (1980)
- Battles for the Ardennes (1978)
- The Battle of Austerlitz (1980)
- The Battle of Borodino: Napoleon in Russia 1812 (1972)
- Battle of Britain Revision Kit, (Test Series, 1970)
- The Battle of Borodino: Napoleon in Russia 1812 (S&T #32, 1972)
- The Battle of Dresden (S&T #75, 1979)
- The Battle of Eylau (S&T #75, 1979)
- The Battle of Moscow (S&T #24, 1970)
- The Battle of Nations (Napoleon at War quad, 1975)
- Battle of the Wilderness: Gaining the Initiative, May 5-6, 1864 (Blue & Gray II quad, 1975)
- The Battles of Bull Run (1973)
- BattleFleet Mars (1977)
- La Belle Alliance: The Battle of Waterloo (Napoleon's Last Battles quad, 1976)
- Berlin '85 (S&T #79, 1980)
- The Big Red One (originally published as Bulge, 1980)
- The Black Prince: The Battle of Navarrete (Great Medieval Battles quad, 1979)
- Blitzkrieg Module System (1969)
- Bloody April: The Battle of Shiloh, 1862 (1979)
- Bloody Ridge (Island War quadrigame, 1975)
- Blue & Gray (1975)
- Blue & Gray II (1975)
- Breakout & Pursuit: The Battle for France, 1944 (1972)
- Breitenfeld (S&T #55, companion game to Thirty Years War quad, 1976)
- The Brusilov Offensive: Imperial Russia's Last Campaign (The Great War in the East quad, 1978)
- Bulge (also published as The Big Red One, 1980)
- Bundeswehr (Modern Battles II quad, 1977)

=== C ===
- 'CA': Tactical Naval Warfare in the Pacific 1941-43 (S&T #38, 1973)
- The Campaign for North Africa (1978)
- Canadian Civil War (1977)
- Caporetto, 1917 (The Great War in the East quadrigame, 1978)
- Cauldron: Battle of Gazala, May 1942 (North Africa quadrigame, 1976)
- Cedar Mountain: Prelude to Bull Run (S&T #86, 1981)
- Celles: The Battle Before the Meuse (Battles for the Ardennes quadrigame, 1978)
- Cemetery Hill (Blue & Gray quadrigame, 1975)
- Centurion: Tactical Warfare, 100 BC-600 AD (S&T #25, 1971)
- Chariot: Tactical Warfare in the Biblical Age, 3000-500 B.C. (PRESTAGS, 1975)
- Chattanooga: Gateway to Victory, Nov. 24-25, 1863 (Blue & Gray II quadrigame, 1975)
- Chicago, Chicago! (S&T #21, 1970)
- Chickamauga: The Last Victory, 20 September 1863 (Blue & Gray quadrigame, 1975)
- The China War (S&T #76, 1979)
- Chinese Farm (Modern Battles quadrigame, 1975)
- Citadel of Blood (Ares #5, 1980)
- City-Fight (1979)
- Clervaux: Breakout of the 5th Panzer Army (Battles for the Ardennes quadrigame, 1978)
- Cobra (S&T #65, 1977)
- Combat Command (S&T #30, 1972)
- Combined Arms (S&T #46, 1974)
- Commando (1979)
- The Conquerors (1977)
- Conquistador (S&T #58, 1976)
- The Creature That Ate Sheboygan (1979)
- Crete (S&T #18, 1969)
- Crusader: Battle for Tobruk (North Africa quadrigame, 1976)
- The Crusades (S&T #70, 1978)

=== D ===
- Dallas (1980)
- Dark Ages: Tactical Warfare, 500-1300 (1971)
- Dawn of the Dead (1978)
- Deathmaze (1979)
- Deployment (orig. Tactical Game 10, 1969, retitled Deployment for Test Series, 1969, retitled Grenadier, 1972)
- Demons (1979)
- Descent on Crete (1978)
- Desert War: Tactical Warfare in North Africa (1973)
- The Desert Fox: Rommel's Campaign for North Africa (S&T #87, 1981)
- Destruction of Army Group Center (S&T #36, 1973)
- Dixie (S&T #54, 1976)
- DMZ: The Battle for South Korea (Modern Battles II quad, 1977)
- DragonQuest (1980)
- Dragonslayer (1981)
- Dreadnought: Surface Combat In The Battleship Era, 1906-45 (1975)
- Dresden 1813 (1978)
- Drive on Stalingrad (1977)
- Drive on Washington (1980)

=== E ===
- The East is Red: The Sino Soviet War (S&T #42, 1974)
- El Alamein: Battles in North Africa, 1942 (1973)
- Empires of the Middle Ages (1980)

=== F ===
- The Fall of Rome (S&T #39, 1973)
- The Fast Carriers (1976)
- Fifth Corp (S&T #82, 1980)
- Fighting Sail: Sea Combat in the Age of Canvas and Shot 1775-1815 (S&T #85, 1981)
- Firefight (1976)
- The First World War (War in Europe expansion)
- The Flight of the Goeben (S&T #21, 1970)
- Flying Circus (S&T #31, 1972)
- Flying Fortress I & II (Test Series, 1969)
- Flying Tigers (Test Series, 1970)
- Four Battles from the Crimean War (quadrigame, 1977)
- Four Battles in North Africa (quadrigame, 1976)
- Four Battles of Army Group South (quadrigame, 1979)
- Foxbat & Phantom (1973)
- The Franco-Prussian War (1972)
- Frederick the Great (S&T #49, 1975)
- Fredericksburg: The Union Repulsed (Blue & Gray II quadrigame, 1975)
- Freedom in the Galaxy (1979)
- Freiburg (Thirty Years War quadrigame, 1976)
- Frigate: Sea War in the Age of Sail (1974)
- Fulda Gap (1977)

=== G ===
- Global War (1975)
- Golan (Modern Battles: Four Contemporary Conflicts quadrigame, 1975)
- Gondor: The Siege of Minas Tirith (1977)
- La Grande Armée (1972)
- Great Medieval Battles (1979)
- The Great War in the East (quadrigame, 1978)
- Grenadier: Tactical Warfare 1680-1850 (1972)
- Grunt (S&T #26, 1971)

=== H ===
- Highway to the Reich (1977)
- Hof Gap (1980)
- Hooker and Lee (Blue & Gray II quadrigame, 1975)
- Hurtgen Forest, (Westwall quadrigame, 1976)

=== I ===
- Inkerman: The Soldier's Battle (Crimean War quad, 1978)
- Introduction to Adventure Gaming (1981)
- Invasion: America (1976)
- Island War: Four Pacific Battles (quad, 1975)
- Italy (Test Series, 1969)

=== J ===
- Jena-Auerstadt: The Battle for Prussia (Napoleon at War quadrigame, 1975)
- John Carter: Warlord of Mars (1979)

=== K ===
- The Kaiser's Battle (S&T #83, 1980)
- KampfPanzer: Armored Combat, 1937–40 (S&T #41, 1973)
- Kasserine: Baptism of Fire (North Africa quadrigame, 1976)
- Kharkov: The Soviet Spring Offensive (S&T #68, 1978)
- Kiev: The Battle of Encirclement, 1941 (Army Group South quad, 1979)
- King Arthur: The Battle of Stonehenge, 536 (Great Medieval Battles quadrigame, 1979)
- Korea: The Mobile War (Test Series, 1969 / Second edition in 1971)
- Korsun: The German Pocket on the Dniepr (Army Group South quad, 1979)
- Kursk: Operation Zitadelle (1971)
- Kursk: History's Greatest Tank Battle, July 1943 (1980)

=== L ===
- Lee Moves North (1972, originally titled Lee at Gettysburg)
- Legion (PRESTAGS, 1975)
- Leipzig: The Battle of Nations (Test Series, 1969 / Second edition, 1972)
- Leningrad: The Advance of Army Group North, Summer 1941 (1980)
- Leyte: Return to the Philippines, October 1944 (Island War quadrigame, 1975)
- Ligny: Incomplete Victory (Napoleon's Last Battles quadrigame, 1976)
- Lille: The Classic Vauban Siege (The Art of Siege quadrigame, 1978)
- Lost Battles: Operational Combat in Russia (1971)
- Lützen (Thirty Years War quadrigame, 1976)

=== M ===
- Marengo: Napoleon in Italy, 14 June 1800 (Napoleon at War quadrigame, 1975)
- The Marne: Home Before the Leaves Fall (1972)
- MechWar '77 (1975)
- MechWar 2 (1979)
- Middle Earth
- A Mighty Fortress (1977)
- Minuteman: The Second American Revolution (1976)
- Modern Battles: Four Contemporary Conflicts (1975)
- Modern Battles II: Four Contemporary Conflicts (1977)
- The Moscow Campaign (1972)
- Mukden: Sino-Soviet Combat in the '70s (Modern Battles: Four Contemporary Conflicts quadrigame, 1975)
- Musket & Pike (1973)

=== N ===
- Napoleon at War: Four Battles (quadrigame, 1975)
- Napoleon at Waterloo (1971)
- Napoleon's Art of War (S&T #75, 1979)
- Napoleon's Last Battles (quadrigame, 1976)
- NATO Division Commander (1979)
- NATO: Operational Combat in Europe in the 1970s (1973)
- The Next War: Modern Conflict in Europe (1978)
- Ney vs. Wellington: The Battle of Quatre Bras (S&T #74, 1979)
- Nordlingen (Thirty Years War quadrigame, 1976)
- Normandy: The Invasion of Europe 1944 (Test Series, 1969)

=== O ===
- Objective Moscow (1978)
- October War: Doctrine and Tactics in the Yom Kippur Conflict, 1973 (S&T #61, 1977)
- Oil War (S&T #52, 1975)
- Okinawa: The Last Battle (Island War quadrigame, 1975)
- The Omega War (1983)
- Operation Grenade (S&T #84, 1981)
- Operation Olympic: The Invasion of Japan 1 November 1945 (S&T #45, 1974)
- Operation Star: The Soviet Winter Offensive, 1943 (Army Group South quad, 1979)
- Operation Typhoon: The German Assault on Moscow, 1941 (1978)
- Outreach (1976)

=== P ===
- Panzer '44: Tactical Combat in Western Europe, 1944–45 (1975)
- Panzer Armee Afrika (S&T #40, 1973)
- Panzer Battles (S&T #73, 1979)
- Panzergruppe Guderian (S&T #57, 1976)
- Paratroop: Three Great Airborne Assaults (S&T #77, 1979)
- Patrol! (1975)
- Patton's 3rd Army (S&T #78, 1980)
- Pea Ridge: The Gettysburg of the West (1980)
- Phalanx (1971)
- The Plot to Assassinate Hitler (S&T #59, 1976)
- PRESTAGS (1975)
- The Punic Wars: Rome vs Carthage, 264-146 B.C. (S&T #53, 1975)

=== Q ===
- Quatre Bras: Stalemate on the Brussels Road (Napoleon's Last Battles quadrigame, 1976)

=== R ===
- Ragnarok (1981)
- Raid: Commando Operations in the 20th Century (S&T #64, 1977)
- Red Star/White Star: Tactical Combat in Europe in the 1970s (1972)
- Red Star/White Star (1979, also part of MechWar 2)
- Red Sun Rising (1977)
- Remagen: Bridgehead on the Rhine (Westwall quadrigame, 1976)
- Renaissance of Infantry (S&T #22, 1970)
- Rescue from the Hive (Ares #7, 1981)
- Revolt in the East (S&T #56, 1976)
- Rifle & Saber: Tactical Combat 1850–1900 (1973)
- Road to Richmond (S&T #60, 1977)
- Robert at Bannockburn (Great Medieval Battles quadrigame, 1979)
- Rocroi ( Thirty Years War quadrigame, 1976)
- Rostov: The First Soviet Counter-Attack, 1941 (Army Group South quad, 1979)
- Russia, 1944 (Test Series, 1969, also titled Tactical Game 3)
- Russian Civil War 1918–1922 (1976)

=== S ===
- St. Vith: The Sixth Panzer Army Attack (Battles for the Ardennes quadrigame, 1978)
- Saipan: Conquest of the Marianas (Island War quadrigame, 1975)
- Sauron (1977)
- Scrimmage: Tactical Professional Football (S&T #37, 1973)
- Search & Destroy: Tactical Combat Vietnam 1965-1966 (1975)
- Sedan, 1940 (Battles for the Ardennes quadrigame, 1978)
- Seelöwe: The German Invasion of Britain (1974)
- Serbia/Galicia: Austria-Hungary at War, 1914 (The Great War in the East quadrigame, 1978)
- Sevastapol: The First Modern Siege (The Art of Siege quadrigame, 1978)
- Shiloh: The Battle for Tennessee (Blue & Gray quadrigame, 1975)
- Sicily: The Race for Messina (S&T #89, 1981)
- The Siege of Constantinople (S&T #66, 1978)
- Sinai: The Arab-Israeli Wars (1973)
- Sixth Fleet (S&T #48, 1975)
- Sniper! (1973)
- Soldiers: Tactical Combat in 1914–15 (1972)
- Solomons Campaign (1973)
- Sorcerer (1975)
- South Africa: Vestige of Colonialism (S&T #62 May/June 1977)
- Spartan (PRESTAGS, 1975)
- SPI Baseball (1980)
- SPI Football (1980)
- Spies (1981)
- Spitfire: Tactical Aerial Combat in Europe 1939-42 (1973)
- Star Trader (Ares #12, 1982)
- Starforce: Alpha Centauri (1974)
- StarGate (1979)
- StarSoldier (1977)
- Stonewall: The Battle of Kernstown (S&T #67, 1978)
- Strategy I (1971)
- Strike Force One (1975)
- Suez to Golan (Mech War 2, 1979)
- Supercharge: Battle of El Alamein (Four Battles in North Africa quad, 1976)
- Swords & sorcery: Quest and Conquest in the Age of Magic (1978)
- Sword and the Stars (1981)

=== T ===
- T-34 (S&T #23, 1970)
- Tamburlaine the Great: The Battle of Angorra (Great Medieval Battles quad, 1979)
- Tank! (S&T #44, 1974)
- Tannenberg (Test Series, 1969 / Second edition published in S&T #69 as companion game to The Great War in the East quad, 1978)
- TaskForce: Naval Tactics and Operations in the 1980's (1981)
- Tchernaya River: The Battle of Tractir Bridge (Crimean War quad, 1978)
- Terrible Swift Sword (1976)
- Thirty Years War (quad, 1976)
- Time Tripper (1980)
- Titan Strike (1979)
- Tito and his Partisan Army: Yugoslavia, 1941–45 (1980)
- To the Green Fields Beyond (1978)
- Turning Point: The Battle of Stalingrad (1972)
- Twelve O'Clock High (Test Series, 1970)
- Tyre: Alexander's Siege and Assault (The Art of Siege quad, 1978)

=== U ===
- Up Scope! (1978)
- Universe (1981)
- U.S.N.: The Game of War in the Pacific, 1941–43 (S&T #29, 1971)

=== V ===
- Vector 3 (1979)
- Veracruz: U.S. Invasion of Mexico 1847 (S&T #63, 1977)
- Viking (PRESTAGS, 1975)
- Von Hindenburg in Poland (The Great War in the East quadrigame, 1978)
- Voyage of the BSM Pandora (Ares #6, 1981)

=== W ===
- Wacht am Rhein (1977)
- Wagram: The Peace of Vienna (Napoleon at War quadrigame, 1975)
- War Between the States 1861–1865 (1977)
- War in Europe (1976)
- War in the East (1974)
- War in the Ice (1978)
- War in the Pacific (1978)
- War in the West (1976)
- War of the Ring (1977)
- Wavre: The Lost Opportunity (Napoleon's Last Battles quadrigame, 1976)
- Wellington's Victory: Battle of Waterloo (1976)
- Westwall: Four Battles to Germany (quadrigame, 1976)
- The Wilderness Campaign: Lee vs. Grant, 1864 (1972)
- Wilson's Creek (S&T #80, 1980)
- Winter War: The Russo-Finnish Conflict (S&T #33, 1972)
- Wolfpack (S&T #47, 1974)
- World War I: 1914–1918 (S&T #51, 1975)
- World War II: European Theater of Operations (1973)
- World War 3: 1976-1984 (1975)
- WorldKiller: The Game of Planetary Assault (Ares #1, 1980)
- Wreck of the B.S.M. Pandora (Ares #2, 1980)
- Wurzburg: Soviet-American Combat in the '70's ( Modern Battles quadrigame, 1975)

=== Y ===
- Year of the Rat, Vietnam, 1972 (S&T #35, 1972)
- Yeoman (PRESTAGS, 1975)
- Yugoslavia: The Battles for Zagreb, 1979 (Modern Battles II quad, 1977)
