= Rifle-Musket =

American Civil War board wargame published in 1974

- The cover of Conflict #7, which contained the pull-out game Rifle-Musket
- Designers: Ed McDonald
- Publishers: Simulations Design Corporation
- Publication: 1974
- Genres: American Civil War

Rifle-Musket is a tactical board wargame published by Simulations Design Corporation (SDC) in 1974 that simulates skirmishes that occurred during the American Civil War.

== Background ==
In the early part of the 19th century, smooth-bore muskets, highly inaccurate beyond 50 yards (46 m), were used by the majority of armies in Europe and North America. In the 1840s–50s, the development of muskets with rifled barrels using ammunition such as Minié balls gave the average soldier much greater accuracy over longer distances. This changed the nature of tactics on the battlefield, where significant damage to the enemy could now be done from much further away, possibly causing the enemy to flee before they could approach close enough to initiate hand-to-hand combat.

== Description ==
Rifle-Musket — the title refers to the relatively new rifled musket that was used by both sides during the American Civil War — is a two-player wargame in which one player takes the role of Union forces, and the other controls Confederate forces. The units are brigade-sized, and there are a very limited number of counters on the map at any time. In one of the scenarios, there are 21 Confederate counters and 17 Union counters; another has even fewer — only 18 Confederate counters opposed by 13 Union counters.

The original game published in Conflict comes with three scenarios:

1. Battle for Little Round Top, during the Battle of Gettysburg, 1863;
2. Battle for New Berne, North Carolina, 1862
3. Battle of Monocacy, Maryland, 1864

When the game was published as a ziplock bag game, a fourth scenario was added, the Battle of New Market (Virginia, May 1864).

The game comes with a two-piece isomorphic map — the two 35 cm x 25 cm (14" x 10") pieces can be placed together in three different ways for the three scenarios. Unusually for the time, the map uses a staggered square grid rather than a hex grid.

=== Gameplay ===
The game uses a standard "I Go, You Go" system, where one player moves and attacks, followed by the other player. The victory conditions vary by scenario, but usually involve eliminating a certain number of enemy units (or preventing the enemy from reaching their elimination goal).

== Publication history ==
Ed McDonald wanted to show how the rifled musket and its longer range changed battle strategies that had been used over the past two centuries. McDonald's goal in creating the game was to keep it simple: "Rather than overburden the wargamer with a massive set of rules studded with exceptions, complicated tables and vague language, [I] instead decided to design a playable game that merely sought to emphasize what [I] believed to be the major factors of Civil War Grand Tactics." Since the game was to be published as a pull-out game in a special Civil War edition of SDC's wargaming magazine Conflict, McDonald designed a small game of tactical skirmishes using a minimum of counters. However, after Rifle-Musket was published in Issue 7 of Conflict (June 1974), and also sold as a ziplock bag game, McDonald disagreed with changes made to his original rules by SDC, claiming the revisions "tended to produce neither simple nor accurate rules."

== Reception ==
In a 1976 poll conducted by SPI to determine the most popular board wargames in North America, Rifle-Musket only placed 189th out of 202 games. Critic Nicky Palmer ascribed this to the small, tactical focus of the game, saying, "In general, this sort of tactical skirmishing is ill-favoured by the hard-core [gamers], which helps to explain the low polling of this game."

Writing for the European wargaming magazine Europa, Martin Menzel found the game seriously unbalanced in favor of the Confederate player, noting, "The Confederate regiments have a much larger firepower than the Union regiments. That is a large handicap which can't be balanced in any way by the Union player ... [The Union player] would have to use a superior strategy — but with two equal partners, you could always predict that the Confederate player is going to win." Menzel felt that some serious rule-rewriting would have to be done "before the game would be really enjoyable."

Critic Charles Vasey thought the game was good but could be improved, commenting, "Rifle-Musket is pretty good but I feel it needs a few more positions on the left of the table, also some method of calculating each weapon separately to prevent the halving of one unit applying to all others. I think this is an innovative and original little game — it is also easy to learn."

In the 1980 book The Complete Book of Wargames, game designer Jon Freeman noted that after the publication of some larger American Civil War games such as Lee Moves North (1972) and The Wilderness Campaign (1972), there was a lull in the gaming world "broken only by a pair of somewhat misguided, and no longer available, attempts to render the Civil War on a tactical level: SPI's Rifle & Saber and Simulations Design Corporation's Rifle-Musket. Battles were pretty much left to the beer-and-pretzels format ... The feeling seemed to be that the Civil War, as a serious matter, was only for quaint historians."

== Other reviews and commentary ==
- Panzerfaust #68
