= A Mighty Fortress =

A Mighty Fortress most often refers to "A Mighty Fortress Is Our God", an English version of Martin Luther's 16th century hymn "Ein feste Burg ist unser Gott". It may also refer to:

- A Mighty Fortress, a 1986 album by Steve Green
- A Mighty Fortress (wargame), a 1977 game published by Simulations Publications
- A Mighty Fortress (novel), a 2010 science fiction novel by David Weber
- A Mighty Fortress, a 2005 novel by neo-Nazi Harold Covington
- Ein feste Burg ist unser Gott, BWV 80, a chorale cantata by Johann Sebastian Bach based on Luther's hymn
- A Mighty Fortress: A New History of the German People, a 2004 history work by Steven Ozment
- The Mighty Fortress, a 1955 newsreel film of Billy Graham's 1954 Crusade for Europe
