= Tito and his Partisan Army: Yugoslavia, 1941–45 =

1980 World War II board wargame

Cover of Strategy & Tactics #68, which contained Tito as a pull-out game.

Tito and his Partisan Army: Yugoslavia, 1941–45 is a board wargame published by Simulations Publications Inc. (SPI) in 1980 that simulates the struggle in the Balkans during World War II between German occupying forces and Yugoslav Partisans led by Tito. The game did not sell well, and is not highly regarded.

== Background ==
After Axis forces invaded the Balkans in 1941, a Communist-led anti-fascist insurgency began, led by Tito. The Yugoslav Partisans were considered the most successful resistance movement of the war.

== Description ==
Tito is a two-player board wargame in which one player controls Axis forces and the other controls Yugoslavian guerrillas. The map of the Balkans is divided into 12 Occupation Zones, each of which has city spaces, mountains, and hideaways. Each zone is rated for alignment (pro-Axis, pro-partisan or neutral), and how many city spaces must be occupied by pro-Axis forces to prevent a popular revolt. Each city space has a victory point value.

=== Gameplay ===
Each game takes 17 turns, each turn representing one 3-month season. Each turn the Axis player may begin by conducting special anti-guerrilla operations. The partisan player may then move units to any adjacent zone into city, mountain or hideaway spaces, attacking Axis units, and earning victory points for gaining control of city spaces. These victory points in turn gain the partisan player new recruits.

The Axis player then moves and attacks.

External events have an effect on the game. As the war progresses, Italian troops pull back, then leave the game entirely. Later in the war, Soviet units appear and reinforce the partisans.

In later parts of the game, the partisans may band together to form larger and larger units, reaching brigade-size and possibly even reaching the status of army divisions.

=== Victory conditions ===
The partisan player wins by accumulating more than 600 victory points before the end of the game. The Axis player wins by preventing this.

== Publication history ==
Tito was designed by Dick Rustin, with graphic design by Redmond A. Simonsen, and appeared as a free pull-out game in Issue 81 of SPI's house magazine Strategy & Tactics in 1980. The game was also released for sale as a boxed set, but player reaction to the non-traditional wargame was not good — critic Nicky Palmer noted "a suspicion [by wargamers] of all games in which any lulls appear, and area movement games suffer in particular" — and Tito failed to crack SPI's Top Ten Best Selling Games list. SPI founder Jim Dunnigan agreed that reaction to the game had been less than positive, calling Tito "a unique situation that needed a unique approach. I kinda liked it, but there's no accounting for taste."

== Reception ==
In Issue 33 of the British wargaming magazine Phoenix, wargame critic Nicky Palmer thought that this game was well-designed to illustrate a guerrilla war, writing, "Tito punishes every concentration of occupation forces with uprisings in the neglected areas: thus it is quite feasible for the Axis to deliver hammer-blows against the early partisan forces but there will usually be a price in the form of new partisan groups springing up elsewhere." Palmer went on to say, "Overall, the game is steadily interesting despite the absence of high-spots ... while other games will give you more thrills you may find you remember your Tito games longer and find yourself tempted back to try another strategy sooner than you expected." Palmer concluded on an ambiguous note, saying, "I wouldn't give it an unqualified recommendation, either for play value, play balance or realism, but it's different; it's subtle; it challenges the parts of your brain that ordinary wargames don't reach."

In a retrospective review in Issue 6 of Simulacrum, Brandon Einhorn noted that "Despite the fact that few other games have dealt with guerilla actions at all, much less guerilla actions as successful as Tito's, this game has never attracted much positive attention." Einhorn agreed with that assessment to some degree, giving the game a grade of only C+, writing, "Between competent players, the game is okay but not great." Einhorn also pointed out that "The game was not well received and even today is considered a dog by many" with mint copies selling for only $5.

== Other reviews and commentary ==
- Moves #50
- Richard Berg's Review of Games #3
