= The Alamo: Victory in Death =

1981 board wargame

The Alamo
- Box cover featuring detail from Fall of the Alamo (1903) by Robert Jenkins Onderdonk
- Designers: Eric Lee Smith
- Illustrators: Redmond A. Simonsen
- Publishers: Simulations Publications Inc.
- Publication: 1981

The Alamo: Victory in Death is a board wargame published by Simulations Publications Inc. (SPI) in 1981 that simulates the Battle of the Alamo during the Texas Revolution.

== Background ==
In 1835, Americans who had settled in the Mexican province of Texas rose up against the Mexican government, in part because of a change to the Mexican constitution that limited the rights of American settlers, and in part because Mexico had abolished slavery when many settlers from the southern United States wanted to bring chattel slavery to Texas. The following year, the Mexican general Santa Anna marched an army of 1800 soldiers to the town of Béxar and surrounded the Alamo mission, where a small group of about 180 Texans set up their defenses in the mission's buildings and awaited Santa Anna's assault.

== Description ==
The Alamo is a board wargame for two players, one of whom controls the Mexican forces, while the other controls the Texan defenders. Although historically the Mexicans enjoyed a ten-to-one numerical advantage, in the game, the Mexican counters only outnumber the Texan counters by a ratio of 3 to 2. In order to simulate the Mexicans' full numerical advantage, the following rules take effect:

- Although Mexican counters have a full zone of control in the six hexes around them, Texan counters only extend their zone of control into one adjacent hex.
- Texan counters all have good ratings for morale and ranged fire, but poor ratings for melee. In contrast, Mexican counters have good ratings for all three factors. If a Texan counter is forced to engage with a Mexican counter in melee, it will be at a disadvantage to represent the numerical difference.

=== Gameplay ===
The game system uses the following series of phases for each turn:

1. Mexican Replacement: Eliminated units have a chance to be brought back onto the board as reinforcements.
2. Mexican Reserve Placement: If the Mexican player opted to commit the Reserve column during the previous turn, the reserve units are placed on the board in their designated spot.
3. Texan Movement
4. Texan Combat: Texans can fire cannons at any Mexican unit that is not adjacent to the cannon. Texan units can also either use ranged fire at any non-adjacent Mexican unit or engage in melee if adjacent to a Mexican unit.
5. Texan Rally: As a result of combat, a unit can be normal, disordered or routed. Any disordered units can be rallied back to readiness. Any units that are routed can be brought back to merely disordered. If a leader was stacked with the routed unit, the leader can rally the unit all the way to readiness.
6. Mexican Reserve Commitment: The Mexican player can choose to commit the reserve units if there is a formed Mexican unit inside the Alamo.
7. Mexican Movement
8. Mexican Combat
9. Mexican Rally
10. Mexican Withdrawal Check: If the Mexicans lose a specified number of casualties during the first five turns, they withdraw from the battlefield and the Texan player wins. The number of cumulative casualties to make this occur are:
  1. First turn: 350 casualties
  2. Second turn: 400
  3. Third turn: 450
  4. Fourth turn: 500
  5. Fifth turn: 550

If the Texans are unable to force a victory this way by the end of the fifth turn, the game continues until either the Mexicans have eliminated all of the Texans or the game ends after the twelfth turn.

== Victory conditions ==
The Texans gain 1 Victory Point for each turn they survive, plus 1 Victory Point for every 100 Mexican casualties (rounded to the nearest hundred.) The total number of Victory Points indicates who won the game:

- 13 or fewer: Mexican victory
- 14 or more: Texan victory

As outlined above, the Texans can win, regardless of Victory Points, if they can inflict enough casualties in the first five turns.

== Publication history ==
The Alamo was designed by Eric Lee Smith, and was published by SPI in 1981 as a boxed set with cover art featuring detail from Fall of the Alamo (1903) by American artist Robert Jenkins Onderdonk, and graphic design by Redmond A. Simonsen. The game sold 12,000 copies, considered a respectable number at the time.

In 1988, Hobby Japan published a Japanese-language version in Issue 53 of the Japanese magazine Tactics. In 1995, Decision Games republished the SPI edition with new maps and counters.

== Reception ==
In Issue 51 of the British wargaming magazine Perfidious Albion, Charles Vasey commented, "A very tactical game with the famous mission molested by several columns of Mexicans. The interest of the game lies in the use of individual units, and the optimising of killing zones." Vasey concluded, "Giving its subject matter it looks a bummer, but the work is there even if the incentive is not."

In Issue 18 of Berg's Review of Games, Joe Caparula reviewed Decision Games' 1995 republication and commented, "this nearly-20-year-old design does achieve what most folios only hope for: simplicity of play coupled with a highly charged, dramatic situation and numerous tactical options." Caparula noted, "Be forewarned: before combat begins, the players should each grab a fistful of dice in both hands and be ready to fire away. After all, each unit attacks separately, and guns get a separate fire if manned by a unit (which in turn gets its own fire). The result is a huge amount of die rolls. Once the reserve column is in play, expect 50 to 70 rolls per combat phase." Caparula concluded, "So we have a simple, fast game with high excitement level and good replay value. Of course, the price is incessant die-rolling ... If you have a dice-rolling machine this can be a blast."

In Issue 5 of Zone of Control, Kirk Irby called this "a very interesting game ... I found The Alamo to be quite enjoyable and balanced." Irby concluded, "Even though all Texan units will probably be eliminated by the end, there is some enjoyment in being able to eliminate enemy units in a greater number. That makes this a game to be played and not just a lesson in futility."

In Issue 60 of Moves, George Schandel wrote, "As a game and a simulation, The Alamo is a genuine tour de force ... The rules are a model of clarity with no fuzzy wording, ambiguity, or loopholes left by things unsaid." Schandel concluded, "The Alamo is a game that can be played many times, but which will still retain a player's interest."

== Awards ==
At the 1981 Charles S. Roberts Awards, The Alamo was a finalist in the category "Best Pre-20th Century Game".

== Other reviews and commentary ==
- Strategist Newsletter #265
- Fire & Movement #105
- Adventure Gaming #10
- Strategy & Tactics #86
- Paper Wars #22
