= Rifle & Saber: Tactical Combat 1850–1900 =

1974 board wargame

Rifle & Saber: Tactical Combat 1850–1900 is a board wargame published by Simulations Publiucations Inc. (SPI) in 1973 that simulates at a tactical level various battles and skirmishes from the mid-19th century to the dawn of the 20th century. Although popular for a time due to its simple rules and many scenarios, it did not receive critical acclaim, and quickly fell out of favor as better wargames appeared on the market.

== Description ==
Rifle & Saber is a board wargame for two players that is set in the 40 years between the development of breech-loading rifles in the late 1850s, to 1900, after which the machine gun, the tank and more powerful artillery took precedence on the battlefield.

=== Gameplay ===
The game uses a generic hex grid map that can be used for almost any engagement. The game system uses a simple alternating series of turns where one player, attacks, moves and engages in Shock Combat, followed by the other player. This completes one game turn, which represent five minutes of battle.

=== Scenarios ===
Rifle & Saber includes seventeen scenarios:

- Fatehpur (Indian Rebellion of 1857, 7 July 1857)
- Varese (Second Italian War of Independence, 26 May 1859)
- Palestro: Attack of the Allied Vanguard (Second Italian War of Independence, 30 May 1859)
- Magenta: Struggle for Ponte Vecchio (Second Italian War of Independence, 4 June 1859)
- First Battle of Bull Run: The Stone Wall (American Civil War, 21 July 1861)
- Shiloh: The Destruction of Prentiss’ Division (American Civil War, 6–7 April 1862)
- Gettysburg: Little Round Top (American Civil War, 1–3 July 1863)
- Gettysburg: Pickett's Charge (American Civil War, 1–3 July 1863)
- Langensalza: The Prussian Rearguard Defense (Austro-Prussian War, 27 June 1866)
- Worth: Struggle for the Niederwald (Austro-Prussian War, 6 August 1870)
- Mars-La-Tour: Attack of the Imperial Guard Cavalry (Franco-Prussian War, 16 August 1870)
- Plevna: The Russian Attack on the Grivitza Redoubt (Russo-Turkish War of 1877–1878, 30 July 1877)
- Plevna: Skobeleff's Capture of the Green Hills Redoubt (Russo-Turkish War of 1877–1878, 8 November 1877)
- Tarapaca (War of the Pacific, 25 November 1879)
- El Caney (Spanish-American War, 1 July 1898)
- Modder River (Boer War, 28 November 1899)
- South Africa: Action near Belfast (Boer War, 12 May 1900).

== Publication history ==
In 1972, SPI founder Jim Dunnigan designed Grenadier, a tactical-level game set in the age of the musket that offered sixteen scenarios from various conflicts of the 18th and 19th centuries. A year later, John Young designed a sequel, Rifle & Saber, that used the same structure as Grenadier but with simplified rules. It was published as a boxed set by SPI in 1973 with graphic design by Redmond A. Simonsen. For a time its simple rules and modularity attracted it to players, and variant rules and new scenarios quickly appeared in popular games magazines such as JagdPanther and Phoenix. But the game quickly fell out of favor, and in a 1976 poll conducted by SPI to determine the most popular board wargames in North America, Rifle and Saber placed 159th out of 202 games.

== Reception ==
Writing in Issue 37 of The Pouch, Nicholas Ulanov liked Rifle & Saber but questioned the game's replayability, saying, "Easy and lots of fun. Only problem is that all of the units are basically the same."

In his 1977 book The Comprehensive Guide to Board Wargaming, Nicky Palmer noted that although this game was based on its predecessor Grenadier, it was "markedly simpler."

In the 1980 book The Complete Book of Wargames, game designer Jon Freeman called Rifle & Saber a "somewhat misguided attempt to render the [American] Civil War on a tactical level". Freeman called this a game that had been "pretty much left to the beer-and-pretzels format."

In Issue 54 of Moves, Steve List thought that Rifle & Saber "attempted (and badly failed) to simulate land combat in the 19th century from the Mexican to the Boer Wars using the same basic rules."

History professor Martin Campion commented "Rifle and Saber was the biggest disappointment of the year. It plays fairly well as an abstract game but it is a disaster as a historical representation."

== Other reviews and commentary ==
- Fire & Movement #19 & #96
- Panzerfaust #68
- Wargamer's Collector's Journal #3
- Boardgame Journal #5
