= The Kaiser's Battle =

World War I wargame

- Strategy & Tactics #83, containing The Kaiser's Battle
- Designers: Joseph Balkoski
- Illustrators: Redmond Simonsen
- Publishers: SPI
- Publication: 1980
- Genres: World War I

The Kaiser's Battle, subtitled "The German Offensive, March 1918", is a board wargame published by Simulations Publications Inc. (SPI) in 1980 that simulates part of the German spring offensive known as Kaiserschlacht ("Kaiser's Battle") during World War I.

== Background ==
By the spring of 1918, the attritional struggles of World War I had brought all of the major European powers to the brink of disaster. However, the stalemate was about to be broken — the United States had declared war on Germany in 1917, and the first American troops were starting to arrive to bolster Allied forces. Germany, realizing it had to force an end to the war before the Americans arrived in force, launched a major surprise offensive in France, Kaiserschlacht, hoping to seize the Channel Ports, which supplied the British Expeditionary Force (BEF), and to drive the BEF into the sea, forcing the Allies to sign an armistice favorable to Germany. The new weapon in Germany's arsenal was the development of Stoßtruppen (storm troopers), who were trained in infiltration tactics, operating in small groups that advanced quickly by exploiting gaps and weak defences, leaving Allied strong points to be mopped up by a second wave. The offensive was initially very successful, opening a large hole in the Allied lines.

== Description ==
The Kaiser's Battle is a two-player board wargame simulating the southern portion of Kaiserschlacht, where one player controls German units and the other controls Allied units.

=== Components ===
The game comes with a 22" x 34" hex grid map of the Picardy area of France, 200 counters and a set of rules.

=== Gameplay ===
The game uses the then-standard "I Go, You Go" system, where the German player moves and attacks followed by the Allied player. However, the combat system, unusually, does not use a Combat Results Table to resolve combat losses. Instead, both players multiply the strengths of their units by a die roll, incorporating modifications for terrain, supply, weather, and artillery support; the ratio of the two numbers is then compared to the defender's morale value. If the number is higher than the morale value, then the attack is successful, and the defending units take step losses — each unit's strength is reduced by one. If the attack fails then the attacker takes step losses. As critic Philip Marchal noted, "This system gives combat a quite different feel that is well suited to The Kaiser's Battle: predictability is lost. A German division can, with some unlucky die rolls, be reduced extensively by a mere battalion of the British." There are also special rules for poison gas, artillery, advance after combat, and air power.

=== Supply ===
The issue of supply has no effect on defending units, but attacking units must be able to trace an unhindered supply line back to a friendly HQ unit. Out-of-supply attacking units allow the defender to increase their die roll in combat, increasing their chances for foiling an attack.

=== Strategy ===
In a lengthy analysis of the game, Doug Davies pointed out that the German player can attack the British lines with overwhelming odds in order to remove the chance of a bad die roll, but then faces the prospect of having no resources left for the end of the game. Instead, Davies suggests that the German player should "take a series of risks in order to ensure the quick destruction of the defending forces. The difficulty with this new game system is deciding what is an acceptable level of risk?" Davies only had one suggestion for the Allied player: never attack, always defend.

=== Victory conditions ===
The German player receives Victory Points for moving units off the western edge of the map, and for capturing town hexes. The Allied player accumulates VPs for eliminating German divisions and occupying fieldworks and redoubts. If, after Allied VPs are subtracted from German VPs, the German player has at least 36 VPs, the German player wins. Any fewer than 36 VPs is an Allied victory.

== Publication history ==
The Kaiser's Battle was designed by Joseph Balkoski, and was published as a free pull-out game in Issue 83 of SPI's house magazine Strategy & Tactics, with graphic design by Redmond Simonsen. Balkoski had been hoping to include the entire battle front of Kaiserschlacht in the game, as well as separate artillery counters, and highly detailed rules. But the constraints of the magazine format — a maximum of 8 pages of rules and 200 counters — forced him to limit the game to only the southern portion of the offensive. SPI also offered the game for sale as a boxed set.

== Reception ==
In Issue 32 of Phoenix, Doug Davies wrote, "I believe The Kaiser's Battle is a success as a game, it can be an enjoyable contest and is particularly suited to solo play where the elusive grail of the perfect German assault will no doubt attract some again and again."

In Issue 54 of Moves, Philip Marchal called this "an unusual operational game of mobile World War I combat, with some interesting tactical flavor added." Marchal noted "One of the most striking features of The Kaiser's Battle game map is the complete lack of roads and railways." Marchal found the mix of various units "extremely varied and interesting." Marchal also found the new combat resolution rule "unusual" but felt that it "accurately portrays the lightning advance by the Germans that allowed no retreats." Marchal concluded by noting "In all [play] tests, the game teetered on the edge to the very last moment of play."

== Other reviews and commentary ==
- Fire & Movement #26
- The Wargamer Vol.2 #23
- Richard Berg's Review of Games #9
- Strategist #192
