= Pea Ridge: The Gettysburg of the West =

1980 American Civil War wargame

Pea Ridge
- Designers: Eric Lee Smith
- Illustrators: Redmond A. Simonsen
- Publishers: Simulations Publications
- Publication: 1980
- Genres: American Civil War

Pea Ridge: The Gettysburg of the West, subtitled "March 7–8, 1862", is a board wargame published by Simulations Publications Inc. (SPI) in 1980 that simulates the Battle of Pea Ridge during the American Civil War.

== Background ==
In late February 1862, the Union Army of the Southwest led by Brigadier General Samuel R. Curtis moved south from central Missouri into northwestern Arkansas. A substantially larger Confederate army led by Major General Earl Van Dorn launched a counteroffensive, hoping to destroy the Union army and recapture northern Arkansas and Missouri. Curtis, having been warned by his scouts of the larger force's advance, divided his army in two near Leetown, Arkansas and Elkhorn Tavern, positioning both in excellent defensive positions. This is where the opposing armies clashed on 7–8 March 1862 to vie for control of Arkansas and the non-Confederate states west of the Mississippi.

== Description ==
Pea Ridge is a board wargame for 2 players, where one player controls Union forces, while the other controls Confederate forces. The game uses a rules system that was developed for SPI's "Great Battles of the American Civil War" (GBACW) series.

In addition to a standard set of rules for combat, movement, leadership, and supply used in all the GBACW games, Pea Ridge adds several rules for situations that were unique to this battle, including Formation restrictions, light and heavy woods, fences, ammunition depletion, night, and straggler recovery.

=== Components ===
The game box includes a 22" x 34" hex grid map scaled at 125 yards (114 m) per hex, 200 counters, and two rulebooks (one for GBACW standard rules and one for rules unique to Pea Ridge).

=== Gameplay ===
The game uses an alternating system of phases. The first player does the following phases:

1. Initial Command Phase
2. Movement
3. Defensive Fire (non-active player)
4. Offensive Fire
5. Retreat before Melee (non-active player)
6. Melee
7. Ammunition Resupply
8. Rally
9. Final Command Phase
10. Victory Determination
11. Withdrawal
12. Straggler Recovery
13. Brigade Combat Effectiveness Recovery

The second player then runs through the same phases, completing one game turn which represent 30 minutes of the battle.The game lasts 30 turns, although players have an opportunity to win the game prematurely after Turn 18.

=== Victory conditions ===
Each player receives Victory Points (VPs) for elimination or capture of enemy units, leaders, and guns, or for bringing enemy brigades to the limit of their effectiveness. In addition, VPs are awarded for occupation or control of four special hexes.

At the end of Day 1 of the battle (Turn 18), if a player has earned 100 VPs and also has at least a 3 to 2 advantage in VPs, the player is declared the winner and the game ends. Otherwise, on the second day of battle (Turns 19–30), VP totals are checked at the end of each even-numbered turn; if one of the players has 50 VPs more than their opponent, the game ends immediately.

If no winner has been declared previous to the end of the game after Turn 30, the player with the most VPs is the winner. If the score is tied, the Union player is the winner.

=== Strategy ===
Critic Steve List commented that the game begins with weak Union forces holding two isolated but defensively superior positions as strong Confederate forces bear down on them. List pointed out that this creates two separate battles; the Union player must somehow hold out at both locations on Day 1 until reinforcements arrive to push the game into Day 2. Conversely, the Confederate player must win both battles by the end of Day 1 ("or win one and achieve at least an exhausted standoff in the other"). List felt that otherwise, if the game moved into Day 2, the Union forces would likely be able to recover and win the game.

== Publication history ==
In 1976, Richard Berg designed Terrible Swift Sword (TSS), simulating the Battle of Gettysburg, which was published by SPI. In 1980, SPI used a revised version of Berg's rules system for the first game of the GBACW series, Pea Ridge, created by Eric Lee Smith, with graphic design by Redmond Simonsen. Amusingly, Smith pointed out in the rules that his great-great-grandfather Gideon Smith had commanded a Confederate company of cavalry at the battle, and if the company was eliminated, Gideon Smith would die, meaning Eric Lee Smith the game designer had never been born and the game must end immediately with no winner.

Pea Ridge sales started briskly as soon as the game was released, and the game immediately rose to #6 on the SPI Top Ten Bestselling Games list when it was released.

SPI would go on to publish several more games in the GBACW series before the company was taken over by TSR in 1982. More games in the GBACW series continued to published, first by TSR, and then by several other publishers over the years.

== Reception ==
In Issue 54 of Moves, Steve List called this "an excellent game subject, as both sides get to maneuver and attack." List concluded by giving this game a grade of "A", writing, "A good game on an interesting situation."

In the February 1981 issue of the Italian game magazine Pergioco, Giovanni Ingellis compared three American Civil War wargames published by SPI and found that Pea Ridge and its streamlined rules was the best, far better than Blood April, which by comparison, he found "monumental and tediously complex, recommended only for those planning to spend time in prison."

Historian Russ Gifford compared Pea Ridge to two other American Civil War games and called it "the best simulation, by far, with the most accurate and detailed map of the area. SPI's map, at 125 yards per hex, is the largest and is an excellent graphical representation of the terrain. Like all three [games], it shows Leetown and Elkhorn Tavern. But the SPI map also delineates the orchards and cornfields, and more of the houses and farms."

== Awards ==
At the 1980 Charles S. Roberts Awards, Pea Ridge was a finalist in the category "Best Pre-Twentieth Century Game".

== Other reviews and commentary ==
- Fire & Movement #83, #85
- The Wargamer Vol.1 #15
