= Bastogne and the Battle of the Ardennes =

1969 WWII board wargame

Bastogne
- Strategy & Tactics #22, which contained the free pull-out game Bastogne
- Designers: Jim Dunnigan
- Illustrators: Redmond A. Simonsen
- Publishers: Simulations Publications Inc.
- Publication: 1969
- Genres: World War II

Bastogne and the Battle of the Ardennes is a board wargame published by Simulations Publications Inc. (SPI) in 1969 that simulates the German operation Wacht am Rhein, better known as the Battle of the Bulge, during World War II.

== Background ==
In December 1944, after a four-month Allied offensive that had pushed German forces across France and back into Germany, Allied intelligence believed that German forces were close to collapse and were incapable of mounting a counterattack. However, Germany surprised the Allies with a major offensive through the Ardennes (Operation Wacht am Rhein) that had the combined objectives of splitting the Allied forces in two, preventing the use of the port of Antwerp, and forcing the Allies to sue for peace. German forces managed to create a large salient in Allied lines (the "Bulge") before the attack was blunted and stopped, the Germans' objectives unfulfilled.

== Description ==
Bastogne is a game for two players, one controlling Allied forces and the other controlling German forces. Although the title of the game implies a focus on just the Siege of Bastogne, the game covers the entire German offensive from beginning to end.

=== Gameplay ===
Bastogne uses the "I Go, You Go" alternating series of player turns standard for games of the time, where the German player moves, fires and moves again, and then the Allied player has the same opportunities. This completes one game turn, which represents one day of the battle. The game is 18 turns in length (16 December 1944 to 2 January 1945), although one side or the other can force an early end to the game by meeting their victory conditions before Turn 18.

Each unit has a given number of movement factors that represent how far the unit can travel. Various terrains increase movement costs. There is also an extra cost to move into an enemy unit's zone of control, and an extra movement cost to move a unit into the same hex as a friendly unit.

Counters representing divisions move slowly but have a large attack factor. Players can break divisions down into smaller units that can move much fast but have a much lower attack factor. There is no cost for breaking down divisions. Smaller units can be reconstituted into a division by first moving the smaller units into the same hex. (There is a movement cost to do this.)

Only one division is allowed in a hex, but if the division is broken into smaller units, they can occupy the same hex. Units in the same hex do not all have to fight the same enemy unit and are moved individually.

Unlike other wargames of the time, zones of control are not "sticky" — that is, units can pass through an enemy unit's zone of control without stopping, although there is a movement cost. In addition, units that are adjacent to enemy units do not have to fight the enemy unit. British critic Rob Gibson noted that this "non-sticky" rule "caused quite a stir" in the wargaming community at the time, with many opposed to the new rule.

=== Victory conditions ===
A German victory depends on creating a clear passage to the north or west. By the End of Turn 18:

- Major German victory: The Germans completely control a road that starts on the east edge of the board and exits on the north or west side of the board AND nine motorized German units have exited the board on either the north or west side.
- Minor German victory: The Germans control a road that starts on the east edge of the board and meets another road that exits off the board between Spa and the Meuse River AND nine motorized German units have exited the board on either the north or the west side.
- Marginal German victory: The Germans hold Spa, St Vith and Bastogne.

An Allied victory depends on control of three towns: Spa, St Vith and Bastogne. By the end of Turn 18:

- Major Allied victory: The Allies hold all three towns.
- Minor Allied victory: The Allies hold two of the towns
- Marginal Allied victory: The Allies hold one of the towns

In the case that both sides achieve a victory condition, the greater victory condition is the winner.

== Publication history ==
When the new wargame magazine Strategy & Tactics teetered on the edge of bankruptcy in 1968 after only 17 issues, Jim Dunnigan stepped in and created Poultron Press to save the magazine. Dunnigan set up his new company in a building in New York City's Lower East Side, where he announced that every new issue of S&T would contain a free wargame. Issue #18 was subsequently released in September 1969 and contained the game Crete. Two issues later, the free pull-out game was Bastogne and the Battle of the Ardennes, Dunnigan's first game based on the Battle of the Bulge. The game map and counters, designed by Redmond A. Simonsen, were printed on thin paper. Players were expected to cut out and mount the counters on cardstock before playing the game.

In 1970, Dunnigan changed the name of Poultron Press to Simulations Publications Inc. (SPI), and re-released Bastogne as a boxed set in both a "flat-pack" plastic box, and a "white cover" cardboard box.

(Bastogne and the Battle of the Ardennes should not to be confused with another similarly titled SPI game published in 1976, Bastogne: The Desperate Defense, December 1944. The two games are not related in form or content.)

There were complaints that the movement and combat systems of Bastogne were too complex, and in 1973, Jim Dunnigan completely rewrote the rules to make a more playable game; the result was released as The Ardennes Offensive.

Dunnigan would go on to design two other completely different "Bulge" games: Wacht am Rhein, a highly complex "monster" wargame with 1600 counters released in 1977; and Bulge, a much smaller and simpler game released in 1980, also published as The Big Red One.

== Reception ==
In Issue 22 of Albion, Michael Nethercote compared Bastogne to Avalon Hill's 1965 game The Battle of the Bulge and found Bastogne to be the superior product, noting that Bastogne's maneuver rules "permit greater freedom of movement than Battle of the Bulge. In this respect I suggest that [SPI's game] is more historically accurate." Nethercote also noted that in this game, "To stop the German spearheads, the Allied player is bound to fragment his divisional counters. In Battle of the Bulge this is impossible, because the only units in play are at regimental level. You can't extend your line by filling squares with battalions in Bulge, [but] in Bastogne you can." Nethercote concluded, "I hope that I have whetted your appetites to beg, borrow, or steal a copy of Bastogne."

In Issue 33 of the British wargaming magazine Phoenix, Rob Gibson compared Bastogne, Jim Dunnigan's first "Bulge" wargame, to his last, 1980's Bulge and concluded, "Which of the two - Bulge or Bastogne - would I choose? For a quick bout of major-generalship, Bulge is a good, fast simulation and very enjoyable, but for a company commander's 'fox hole' viewpoint, Bastogne is superb - after all these years, I can't fault it."

In Issue 30 of the wargaming magazine Simulacrum, Martin Campion found Bastogne "impossible" to play, pointing out that it "has a movement system that is brilliant in its reflection of reality – it is so accurate that each game general needs a staff of two in order to keep track of movement and supply."

== Other reviews and commentary ==
- Fire & Movement #65
- The Wargamer Vol 1. No.3 and Vol.2 No.17
- Panzerfaust # 47 and #58
- International Wargamer Vol.3 No.11
- Spartan International Monthly August 1970
