= The Desert Fox: Rommel's Campaign for North Africa =

1981 WWII board wargame

The Desert Fox
- Cover of Strategy & Tactics #87, which contained The Desert Fox as a free pull-out game
- Designers: Richard Berg
- Illustrators: Redmond A. Simonsen
- Publishers: Simulations Publications Inc.
- Publication: 1981
- Genres: WWII

The Desert Fox: Rommel's Campaign for North Africa is a board wargame published by Simulations Publications Inc. (SPI) in 1981 that simulates the North Africa Campaign during World War II.

== Background ==
British forces had enjoyed a great degree of success against Italian forces in North Africa in 1941. That changed after the arrival of the Afrika Korps under the command of Erwin Rommel, who launched an offensive against the Allies, defeating them at Gazala in June 1942 and besieging Tobruk.

== Description ==
The Desert Fox is a board wargame for two players, one of whom controls Allied forces, while the other controls the Axis forces. The game includes 200 die-cut counters, standard for SPI's pull-out magazine games, but unusually includes not one but two 11" x 17" hex grid maps scaled at 16 kilometres (9.9 mi) per hex, meant to be placed side-by side to cover the area of conflict.

=== Gameplay ===
The game system uses a traditional "I Go, You Go" system of alternating turns, with the Germans going first:

1. Reinforcement
2. Air Allocation
3. Initial Movement
4. First Enemy Reaction
5. First Combat
6. Motorized Movement
7. Second Enemy Reaction
8. Second Combat
9. Refit

Once the German player has finished, the Allied player has the same opportunities. This completes one game turn, which represents one month of conflict.

=== Supply ===
Units are kept supplied through either supply dumps or Mobile Supply Units. If a supply dump cannot trace an unhindered line back to its base of operations, the dump is expended on a dice roll of 1, 2 or 3.

=== Scenarios ===
Two scenarios are supplied with the game:

- "Race for Tobruk": The German drive on Tobruk in 1942. A short five-turn scenario designed to teach the rules.
- "The North African Campaign: Covers the entire campaign, 1942–1943. 22 turns long

== Publication history ==
The Desert Fox was created by Richard Berg (designer of the 1977 monster game Campaign for North Africa), and was published by SPI in 1981 with graphic design by Redmond A. Simonsen as a free pull-out game in Issue 87 of Strategy & Tactics.

In 1983, an "prequel" expansion of the game simulating the British–Italian conflict in 1941, Fox Killed: O'Connor vs. Graziani for North Africa, was published in Strategy & Tactics Special Edition No. 1. In 2006, Six Angles published a Japanese language version of the original game.

== Reception ==
In Issue 51 of the British wargaming magazine Perfidious Albion, Charles Vasey commented, "Lots of counters and two maps, plus the results of all those other Africa games. Possibly this will be the first S&T game in sometime to be played to any extent." Vasey noted that only two scenarios were included with the game and thought that this "implies a lack of testing budget."

In Issue 58 of Moves, J Matisse Enzer noted, "A well-played game usually takes the form of a series of distinct 'operations', with the more thorough and precise player being the winner. Just as thoroughness and precision are requisites for success in The Desert Fox, lack of these same qualities is an assurance of defeat."

== Awards ==
At the 1981 Charles S. Roberts Awards, The Desert Fox was a finalist in the category "Best Pre-20th Century Game".

== Other reviews and commentary ==
- Richard Berg's Review of Games #24
- Fire & Movement #32 and #60
- American Wargamer Vol.9, #6
