= Introduction to Adventure Gaming =

Fold-up board wargame booklet

Adventure Gaming is a booklet published by Simulations Publications, Inc. (SPI) 1981 that contains three short games in different genres meant to introduce players to SPI's range of products.

== Contents ==
Adventure Gaming is a booklet containing three introductory-level games, each one from a different genre.

=== The Creatures that Ate New York ===
A science fiction game that is a shorter version of SPI's two-player game The Creature That Ate Sheboygan, where a Godzilla-like monster rises out of Lake Michigan to attack the town of Sheboygan. In The Creatures that Ate New York, up to seven players randomly pick a monster and a secret objective.

=== Napoleon at Waterloo ===
This is a simulation of the Battle of Waterloo, and is designed to introduce the player to many of the concepts of historical board wargames.

=== The Tower of Azann ===
A fantasy game using a "choose your own adventure" format of numbered paragraph system. One or two players enter the Tower to rescue a child that had been kidnapped.

== Publication history ==
Napoleon at Waterloo, designed by Jim Dunnigan and developed by Redmond Simonsen, was originally published by SPI in 1971, and was reprinted for inclusion in Adventure Gaming. The other two games were specifically created for Adventure Gaming: The science fiction monster game The Creatures that Ate New York was designed by Redmond Simonsen and Justin Leites, and the fantasy adventure The Tower of Azann was designed by Bob Ryer, Justin Leites, Gerard King and Redmond Simonsen.

== Reception ==
In Issue 50 of The Space Gamer, W. G. Armintrout was generally unimpressed by this offering, asking, "What good is an introductory game that is all introductory and no game? Tower is enough to discourage any novice fantasy gamer, while Creatures is hardly an endorsement for science fiction gaming. Only Napoleon at Waterloo is both a decent game and an introduction to gaming. I should also warn you that the 'History of Gaming' and the 'Hints on Play' promised on the cover aren't to be found inside the booklet! Even so, one of the three games here is perfect for the purpose."

David Lent of Centurion's Review felt that this product did a good job of filling an empty niche in the gaming world, that being games specifically designed for absolute beginners.

== Other reviews ==
- Moves #7 & #53
- Fire & Movement #24
- International Wargamer Vol. 1 #4
- Panzerfaust Magazine #63
- Phoenix #11
- Simulacrum #19
