= Rescue from the Hive =

Board game

Ares Issue #7, featuring Rescue from the Hive

Rescue from the Hive is a science fiction board game published by Simulations Publications, Inc. (SPI) in 1981.

== Description ==
Rescue from the Hive is a 2-player game set in the future. Radical alien Znons have kidnapped Terran Ambassador Helstrom with his daughter Athena and are now fleeing with the captives in their spaceship. One player uses a squad of Space Marines from Earth to attempt to rescue the hostages, while the other player uses Znon defenses to try to stave off the Marines until the alien ship can engage its hyperdrive and escape.

Rules are also included for solitaire play, with the player running the Space Marines, and the Znon defence run by automatic rules.

=== Components ===
- Map of the inside of the ship with six nesting areas connected by corridors.
- Counters representing humans, Znon, and traps
- Rule sheet
- Record Log Sheet

=== Setup ===
Each player spends a specified number of points on their forces. The Terran player can buy scouts, engineers, two-person lancer units, and up to six Darter space ships. The Znon player always starts with the Master Queen, seven other Queens and the two hostages, and can buy additional soldiers, workers, traps, and fake traps. The Znon player can also spend points to reduce the number of turns until the Znon ship can engage its hyperdrive to escape.

The Znon player then places all the Znon counters on the ship map facedown, with at least one Queen in each nesting area. The Master Queen can be placed anywhere on the map, but the two human hostages must accompany the Master Queen.

=== Objective ===
Once the Terran player sees the Znon setup, the Terran player makes an irrevocable choice of objective:

- Rescue the Hostages: The main objective is to rescue the hostages.
- Punitive Mission: The main objective is to kill as many Znon as possible. Rescuing the hostages also provides victory points but is not necessary for victory.

=== Gameplay ===
The game lasts a set number of turns. If the end of the last turn is reached, the Znon successfully engage their hyperdrive and escape.

The game begins with the Darters ships closing in. The Znon player has one round to fire lasers at the Darters before they attach to the Znon ship's hull, trying to eliminate individual Terran units or even an entire Darter.

The Terran player chooses where the Darters will attach to the hull, which can be next to any empty space on the map. The Terrans move into the ship, and turn over Znon counters as they encounter them, engaging in combat or trying to destroy traps. As Znon Queens become activated, they can attempt mind control of Terran units, in addition to standard combat.

If the Terrans rescue the hostages and get them to a Darter, the Znon player still has one last chance to destroy the rescue ship with laser fire, if the lasers are still functioning.

=== Victory conditions ===
- Rescue the Hostages: The Terran player wins if the Marines rescue both hostages, and safely evacuate them from the map via a Darter with at least 50% of the Marines. The Znon win if the hostages do not survive, or more than 50% of the Marines are killed.
- Punitive Mission: The Terran player wins by achieving a set number of Victory Points based on kill ratio. The Terran player also gets significant Victory Points for successful rescue of the hostages, but the rescue is not necessary to win. The Znon win if the Terran player fails to reach the necessary Victory Points.

In either scenario, the Znon player wins if the game reaches the end of final turn, enabling the Znon to engage their hyperdrive and escape.

== Publication history ==
Rescue from the Hive was designed by Nick Karp, with graphics and artwork by John W. Pierard and Redmond A. Simonsen, and was published as a pull-out game in Issue 7 of Ares.

A Polish-language boxed set of the game titled W imieniu Ziemi (On Behalf of the Earth) was published in Poland by Encore Games.

== Reception ==
In Issue 48 of The Space Gamer (February 1982), David Ladyman thought this to be an average game, saying "SPI continues to produce an attractive, playable game every other month, in Ares. None of these games is likely to set the world on fire, or even produce lasting interest, but so far, they tend to be consistent diversons. RFTH is another from that mold. On the other hand [...] I get the impression that no one had his heart in this game. SPI has committed itself to cranking out an SF/fantasy game every two months, whether it has one ready or not. Having said this last, let me repeat that, for the most part, they have succeeded with RFTH. If you enjoy the premise, you'll probably enjoy the game."

The Polish website Tanuki Czytelnia (The Tanuki Reading Room) reviewed the Polish-language version of the game, and found the game "quite dynamic, provided you master the rules, which is difficult for the beginning player." While the game was judged to be "a solid game", the solitaire rules were the only feature that distinguished this from other games published by Encore.

== Other reviews ==
- Moves #56 (April–May 1981)
