= The Flight of the Goeben =

1977 board wargame

The boxed "flatpack" edition

The Flight of the Goeben, subtitled "World War I Naval Operations in the Mediterranean", is a board wargame published by Simulations Publications Inc. (SPI) in 1970 that simulates the pursuit of the Goeben and Breslau during World War I.

== Background ==
At the outbreak of World War I in August 1914, the German battlecruiser SMS Goeben and the light cruiser SMS Breslau were posted to the Mediterranean. All sides in the war at that point hoped Turkey would remain neutral. However, after battlefield setbacks in September 1914 culminated in the Battle of the Marne, Germany decided to persuade Turkey to join the Central Powers, and ordered Goeben and Breslau to proceed to Istanbul in order to offer the service of the German ships to Turkey. Despite orders from the British Admiralty to intercept the two ships, the Germans escaped, and British ships were unable to catch them before they reached Istanbul. Germany sold the two ships to Turkey, though the supposed sale was simply a ruse, since the ships were still staffed by their German crews and officers. In October 1914, the German ships led a Turkish raid on Russia's Black Sea ports, bringing Turkey into the war on the side of the Central Powers. Three British admirals were subsequently censured for their failure to stop the Goeben.

Winston Churchill later wrote that due to the entry of Turkey into the war, Goeben had brought "more slaughter, more misery, and more ruin than has ever before been borne within the compass of a ship."

== Description ==
The Flight of the Goeben is a two-player board wargame in which one player controls the Goeben and Breslau, and the other controls the British and French fleets. The game starts on 2 August 1914, the day before Germany declares war against France, and two days before the UK declares war on Germany.

=== Objectives ===
Both players know in general terms what the other wants to accomplish:

- The German player tries to get Goeben and Breslau into either the Atlantic or to the Dardanelles.
- The Allied player tries to find and sink either or both German ships, and, using French transports, must move the 19th Corps from North Africa to France.

However, neither player starts the game knowing exactly what their victory objectives are.

On 3 August, the German player draws a Secret Draw Result (SDR) counter and consults the German Victory Conditions chart that reveal the Victory Points the German player will gain by attaining certain objectives. This is not revealed to the British player.

On 4 August, the Allied player also draws an SDR counter and consults the British Victory Conditions chart, and this also is not revealed to the German player.

Thus neither player knows exactly what they must prevent their opponent from accomplishing.

=== Gameplay ===
The players alternate moving their ships, each game turn representing six hours. The Allied player can use search patterns to try to find the German ships, while the German ships try to evade detection.

==== Coal ====
Coal fueled most ships of the era, and both players have a coaling index to indicate how much coal every ship on the map ship has left. The Allies must use Malta, North African ports, or Toulon to obtain coal. The Germans can only find coal from Pola, Italian ports (at a reduced rate, since Italy was, at the time, a neutral country) or from German colliers.

=== Combat ===
A single die is rolled by the attacking player to determine the number of hits they have achieved. This is modified if a smaller ship is firing on a larger ship.

=== Advanced rules ===
There are a number of advanced rules involving non-historic "what if?" conditions, such as what if Italy had joined the Central Powers?

=== Victory conditions ===
The game ends at the end of 12 August (33 game turns). The player who collects the most Victory Points from fulfilling achievements derived from their SDR objective, as well as Victory Points awarded for general objectives — German ships escaping, or Allied ships sinking the German ships — is the winner.

== Publication history ==
The Flight of the Goeben was designed by Dave Williams, with graphic design by Redmond A. Simonsen. It was one of the first free pull-out games published in Strategy & Tactics by SPI — then known as Poultron Press — appearing in Issue 21 in 1970. The game did not have die-cut counters; instead, the counters were printed on sheets of paper and had to be cut apart by the players.

The game was later released as a boxed set with die-cut counters.

== Reception ==
In Issue 22 of Albion, Malcolm Watson thought that the designer had "done a good job of making the rules clear and easy to follow. There are a few points which might, perhaps, have been clearer. On the whole, good layout and clear presentation." Watson found the rules innovative, especially the Secret Draw Result mechanism, and also admired the simplicity of combat, which he found "quite in order for the game - a long drawn-out tactical-type engagement would change the emphasis of the game, and this doesn't seem necessary or even desirable; the game stands up well on its own merits." Although Watson found some ambiguities in the rules, he summarized The Flight of the Goeben as "a very fine game — as good as any we have tested. It has many advantages, of which brevity is not the least important for wargamers with limited time for face-to-face play. It is simple in structure, yet sufficiently loaded with variables to make it quite a challenge for expert and novice alike. Highly recommended."

In Issue 8 of the UK magazine Games & Puzzles, Don Turnbull thought that the game "suffers through unclear rules, but once the problems are ironed out it makes interesting play."

The Kommandeur called this "A very good game, rather on the lines mechanically speaking, of Midway or Jutland. The rules are clear and well thought out, and contain one or two interesting new features."

== Other reviews and commentary ==
- Pursuit & Destroy Vol.1 #2
- The Wargamer Vol.2 #24
