= Combat Command (wargame) =

World War II tactical wargame

- Cover of Strategy & Tactics #30 containing Combat Command
- Designers: Jim Dunnigan
- Illustrators: Redmond Simonsen
- Publishers: SPI
- Publication: 1972
- Genres: World War II

Combat Command, subtitled "Tactical Armored Warfare, France 1944", is a board wargame published by Simulations Publications Inc. (SPI) in 1972 that simulates World War II combat in Western Europe at the level of platoons and single tanks.

== Description ==
Combat Command is a two-player board wargame set in Western Europe after D-Day where one player controls Axis units and the other controls Allied units.

=== Components ===
The game box contains a 22" x 28" hex grid map with abstract terrain reminiscent of Western Europe; an 8-page rule book; and 200 die-cut counters.

=== Gameplay ===
The game uses the common "I Go, You Go" sequence, where players take alternating turns to move and attack. However, this game introduces defensive fire, an innovation at the time, where a defensive unit has an opportunity to fire at an attacker before the attacker gets an attack.

=== Scenarios ===
The game comes with six scenarios. Most critics thought all of them were heavily unbalanced in favor of the defender. Critic Martin Campion noted, "The six scenarios furnished with the game will probably cause great rage and frustration. It may be possible for the offensive to win in one of the scenarios, but I am not sure yet. I am fairly sure that the rest are hopeless, if interesting. It would be well to proceed to the realm of Inventing your own situations as rapidly as possible."

== Publication history ==
Jim Dunnigan founded new wargame publisher Poultron Press in 1969, marketing a number of very cheaply made "Test Series" games featuring typewritten pages with hand-drawn maps and graphics and thin paper counter sheets, packaged in a plain manila envelope. One of these was Tactical Game 3, also titled Test Series Game 3, a tactical World War II wargame set on the Eastern Front designed by Dunnigan.

In 1970, Dunnigan sold the rights to Tactical Game 3 — retaining royalty rights — to rival publisher Avalon Hill, who republished the game as PanzerBlitz.

Two years later, Poultron Press had become SPI. Dunnigan revised the rules to Tactical Game 3 and published the result in Issue 30 of Strategy & Tactics as Command Control. Set in the European western theater, it was designed to be a companion game to the Eastern-theater-themed PanzerBlitz.

=== Changes to PanzerBlitz rules ===
Dunnigan made several notable changes to his original PanzerBlitz rules:

- Defensive fire was introduced as a tactic.
- The map scale was changed from 250 metres (270 yd) per hex to 750 metres (820 yd) per hex.
- Because of the enlarged scale, units from both players could occupy the same hex.
- "Retreat" was added to the possible results on the Combat Results Table.
- A zone of control prevents enemy units from moving across the front of a unit.

=== Sales ===
Although the game initially sold well, sales rapidly fell off, and the game was quickly dropped as SPI developed better tactical games such as Sniper! Martin Campion wrote a year after its publication "No game that SPI ever produced was so eagerly, even desperately, anticipated, yet now, a year later, nobody plays it anymore ... the game was lusted for by the same people who regularly report that PanzerBlitz is by far their favorite game, and Combat Command, when it came, did not fill their desire for a western front PanzerBlitz."

== Reception ==
In Issue 55 of Panzerfaust, Paul Mills was particularly incensed at inaccuracies in the description and powers of the various tanks, noting "the treatment given to the Sherman tank is particularly offensive to anyone that really knows AFVs."

Norman Beveridge, writing in Issue 3 of the Spartan Simulation Gaming Journal, found the game statistics for American soldiers to be too weak, pointing out, "“One very sore point is their rating of the U.S. Infantry. The article on the American army that accompanied the game in the magazine states that U.S. infantry units had much more firepower. Why rate them less than the Germans then?"

In Issue 7 of Moves, Martin Campion reported, "Several [PanzerBlitz] procedures are happily simplified with Combat Command and the board is much more realistic than the PanzerBlitz board." However, after looking at all the wargames SPI released in 1972, Campion highly recommended all of them except Combat Command.

In a retrospective review in Issue 65 of Fire & Movement, Jeff Petraska commented, "Combat Command shows Dunnigan's old flair for innovation. This game brought forth concepts such as Defensive Fire and the ability of opposing units to simultaneously occupy the same hex. " Petraska concluded, "The game, which Dunnigan touted as a not-quite-perfect improvement over Panzerblitz, played pretty well at the time."

In Issue 24 of Simulacrum, Brian Train noted, "Not all of the ideas [from Strategy Game 3] made it over into the Avalon Hill design [of PanzerBlitz], which is too bad – I found the different time and space scales, and therefore different counter values, made the game play smoother and obviated a lot of the "Panzerbush" syndrome found in the two AH tactical games, where units endowed with enormous movement values dart from cover to cover."

== Other reviews and commentary ==
- Outposts #2
