= MechWar 2 =

1979 board wargame

- Designers: Mark Herman
- Illustrators: Redmond A. Simonsen
- Publishers: Simulations Publications Inc.
- Publication: 1979
- Genres: Modern mechanized combat

MechWar 2 is a board wargame published by Simulations Publications, Inc. (SPI) in 1979 that simulates modern mechanized combat and tactics. Two games are included in the box: Suez to Golan and Red Star/White Star.

== Description ==
MechWar 2 is a two-player wargame involving platoon-sized squads. The game box contains two separate games that use the same rule system:

- Suez to Golan: Battles from the Yom Kippur War. Two hex grid maps are included, one of the Sinai Desert where it borders the Suez Canal, and the other of the Golan Heights.
- Red Star/White Star: Hypothetical battles between American and Soviet forces in northwest Germany. Two maps are included, one of open terrain typical of the northwest German countryside, the other more forested. The maps can be used individually, or can be combined by putting any edge of one map to any edge of the other.

The game system uses simultaneous movement and combat, with each turn representing 5 minutes of combat. There are also rules for aircraft and helicopters, ammunition depletion, observation, engineers, chemical agents, minefields, and tactical nuclear weapons. It has been characterized as "a fairly complex game."

=== Scenarios ===
- Suez to Golan: Seven scenarios are set in the Sinai close to the Suez Canal, and six are set on the Golan Heights. The scenarios are designed to educate the players about the rules if played in order, the first being relatively simple, while each succeeding scenario adds new rules.
- Red Star/White Star: Eleven scenarios are included, and also increase in complexity as each one is played.

There are also extensive suggestions about how players can design their own scenarios.

== Publication history ==
In 1975, SPI published MechWar '77, a tactical board wargame about armored combat. Critics were unimpressed by several aspects of the game, and several years later, game designer Mark Herman was given the task of improving it. Rather than creating a sequel, Herman completely rewrote the game system, producing a totally new game. As critic Marion Bates noted, "While the [map] scales are virtually identical, from that point on the two games diverge completely in approach and design philosophy." The result was MechWar 2, which was published in 1979 with graphic design by Redmond A. Simonsen. The game immediately rose to #1 on SPI's Top Ten Bestselling Games list, and stayed on the list for six months. The two games, Red Star/White Star and Suez to Golan, were also released as separate games.

In 2025, Aurora Game Studios published a Chinese-language edition.

== Reception ==
In Issue 25 of the British wargaming magazine Phoenix, Donald Mack thought the game had some good points, especially the ability of tanks to "defilade" (hide most of their bulk behind a dip or rise in the terrain), and rules about ammo expenditure. Although Mack liked the simultaneous movement/combat system, he admitted that "the game can still be rather slowmoving, the more so when some of the main [extra rules] are used." Mack also noted this was exacerbated by the multiplicity of charts and tables, pointing out "When one tank platoon fires at another this involves the consultation of four tables and two die-rolls." However, Mack believed that "while sequence of play can be long-drawn-out it is emphatically NOT dull: the interwoven sequence keeps both players well-occupied and ... things happen fast." Mack concluded, "MechWar 2 is a fairly complex game, rather slow in play but certainly not slow-seeming to the players ... It is not a game for the beginner nor is it a 'beer and pretzels' game ... what it is is a remarkably good and up-to-date simulation of tactical mechanised warfare ... Armour enthusiasts will love it and so should all 'modern' enthusiasts who wish to be worthy of the name."

In Issue 55 of Moves, Ian Chadwick called it "a new innovative game with an exceptional amount of simulation detail and applied data." However, Chadwick warned "Its very completeness makes it a difficult game." Chadwick found that "The system works well and functions with a clear logic, although combat resolution is long and involved ... With all the dice-rolling and modifying, players can spend more time reading and rolling than moving units, making this a dull game for action." Chadwick felt that "The game's biggest problem is scope: it attempts to simulate all of the factors which influence the modern battlefield. It may well do so but it suffers as a game accordingly." Despite this, Chadwick concluded by giving this game a "C" for Playability, "B" for Component Quality, and "B" for Historical Accuracy, writing "Still, for the information it offers along, it is a game no armour buff should be without — even if they never play it."

In a retrospective review in Issue 13 of The Journal of 20th Century Wargaming, Marion Bates wondered if the complexity was necessary, asking "if it couldn't have been done in a more facile manner." Bates concluded, "This game is not for everyone. It's a bit esoteric in the detail of its approach to the subject for the more casual among us. On the other hand, those who enjoy immersing themselves in complexity are in for a treat."
