= Cedar Mountain: Prelude to Bull Run =

1981 American Civil War wargame

Cedar Mountain
- Cover of Strategy & Tactics #86
- Designers: David Bush; Jim Simon; Anthony Williams
- Illustrators: Redmond A. Simonsen
- Publishers: Simulations Publications
- Publication: 1981
- Genres: American Civil War

Cedar Mountain: Prelude to Bull Run, subtitled "August 9, 1862", is a board wargame published by Simulations Publications Inc. (SPI) in 1981 that simulates the Battle of Cedar Mountain during the American Civil War.

== Background ==
After the failure of the Union's advance into the Virginia Peninsula in the early summer of 1862, the Union Army of Virginia under Maj. Gen. Nathaniel P. Banks marched into north Virginia in August with the goal of capturing the Confederate capital of Richmond. Confederate forces under Maj. Gen. Thomas J. "Stonewall" Jackson met them near Cedar Mountain. The battle was the first of the Northern Virginia campaign and set the stage for the Second Battle of Bull Run.

== Description ==
Cedar Mountain is a board wargame for 2 players, where one player controls Union forces, while the other controls Confederate forces. The game uses a rules system that was developed for use in SPI's "Great Battles of the American Civil War" (GBACW) series.

In addition to a standard set of rules for combat, movement and supply used in all the GBACW games, Cedar Mountain adds several rules for situations that were unique to this battle, including dismounted cavalry, artillery and small arms ammunition, terrain, and artillery overshoot.

=== Components ===
The game box includes a 22" x 34" hex grid map scaled at 125 yards (114 m) per hex, 200 counters, a rulebook and various player aids.

=== Gameplay ===
The game uses an alternating system of phases. The first player does the following phases:

1. Initial Command Phase
2. Movement
3. Defensive Fire (non-active player)
4. Offensive Fire
5. Retreat before Melee (non-active player)
6. Melee
7. Ammunition Resupply
8. Rally
9. Final Command Phase

The second player then runs through the same phases, completing one game turn. The game lasts 13 turns, each representing 30 minutes of the battle.

=== Victory conditions ===
Each player gains Victory Points (VPs) for elimination or capture of enemy units, guns, and leaders. VPs can also be earned for the occupation of certain special hexes on the map at the end of each game turn. In addition, the Confederate player receives a VP for each unit that is exited safely off the map via a special hex. At the end of the game, the player with the most VPs is the winner.

== Publication history ==
In 1976, Richard Berg designed Terrible Swift Sword (TSS), simulating the Battle of Gettysburg, which was published by SPI. In 1980, SPI used a revised version of Berg's rules system for the first three games of the GBACW series: Pea Ridge, Wilson's Creek and Drive on Washington. SPI received a half dozen freelance designs for further games in the GBACW series, and chose one simulating the battle of Cedar Mountain that was designed by David Bush, Jim Simon, Anthony Williams. The result, Cedar Mountain, was released as a free pull-out game in Issue 86 of SPI's house magazine Strategy & Tactics, featuring graphic design by Redmond Simonsen. The game was an instant hit — critic Russ Gifford noted, "It showed that the streamlined TSS system could be delivered in a magazine game ... a straightforward battle, with fewer special rules – which was always a plus."

== Reception ==
In Issue 52 of Moves, Eric Lee Smith called this game "simple, fast playing ... both sides get a chance to attack vigorously and defend tenaciously." After a lengthy analysis of best strategies, Smith concluded, "Cedar Mountain rewards a player who is daring without being rash, careful without being cautious, and clever without depending on luck."

David Martin compared Cedar Mountain to the much larger and more complex Road to Washington and found that he preferred Cedar Mountain, calling it "an accurate and much less complicated game."

== Awards ==
At the 1981 Charles S. Roberts Awards, Cedar Mountain was a finalist in the category "Best Pre-Twentieth Century Game".

== Other reviews and commentary ==
- Fire & Movement #53, #83, #86
- The Wargamer Vol.1 #21
