= Road to Richmond =

Board wargame

Cover of Strategy & Tactics #60, which contained Road to Richmond as a pull-out game

Road to Richmond, subtitled "The Peninsular Campaign, May–July, 1862", is a board wargame published by Simulations Publications Inc. (SPI) in 1977 that simulates the Peninsula Campaign of 1862 during the American Civil War.

== Background ==
In mid-1862, Major General George. B. McCLellan launched the first large-scale offensive in the Eastern theater of the American Civil War, landing his army at Fort Monroe and moving northwest, up the Virginia Peninsula, in the hopes of capturing the Confederate capital of Richmond, Virginia. McClellan was initially successful against the Confederate States Army in Northern Virginia led by General Joseph E. Johnston, but when Johnston was wounded at the Battle of Seven Pines, he was replaced by General Robert E. Lee, who proved to be a much more formidable leader during the pivotal Seven Days Battles.

== Description ==
Road to Richmond is a two-player board wargame where one player controls the Union army, and the other the Confederate army during 26–28 June 1862, the central three days of the Seven Days Battle. The game, which lasts 20 turns, starts with most of the Confederate forces on the map and most of the Union forces off the map.

=== Gameplay ===
The game uses a simple "I Go, You Go" system of alternating turns in which one player moves and attacks, followed by the other player. This completes one turn, which represents two hours of game time. With a small 17" x 22" paper hex grid map and only 100 counters, the rules for this game have been characterized as "simple."

Optional rules include limitations on advances after combat, Union siege train artillery, and variable Confederate reinforcements.

== Publication history ==
In 1975, SPI published Blue and Gray, a collection of four American Civil War wargames in one box. The "quadrigame" concept proved popular, and SPI quickly produced more, including Blue & Gray II. In 1977, Joe Angiolillo designed another American Civil War wargame using the Blue & Gray rules titled Road to Richmond. It was published as a free pull-out game in Issue 60 of Strategy & Tactics (January–February 1977), and was also offered for sale as a "folio game", packaged in a double LP-sized cardstock folio. It did not crack SPI's Top Ten Bestseller List.

== Reception ==
In his 1977 book The Comprehensive Guide to Board Wargaming, Nick Palmer noted that the balance changes during the game, saying, "An early Confederate advantage is gradually offset by Union reinforcements."

In Issue 19 of Fire & Movement, Bill Haggart and Pete Belli commented, "Road to Richmond just doesn’t 'click. Poor old McLellan gets run off the map to Harrison’s Landing with Lee in pursuit, and that's it."

In the 1980 book The Complete Book of Wargames, game designer Jon Freeman commented that "The situation presents some options for each player, and the fluidity of battle gives in more interest than those of the [Blue & Gray games]." Freeman also noted that the optional rules "despite some quirks, add to the realism of the simulation." He concluded by giving the game an Overall Evaluation of "Good."

In The Guide to Simulations/Games for Education and Training, Martin Campion warned "The smaller Confederate army is in a position where it might destroy the Union army in detail as the Union forces attempt to enter the board. [The Union must] withdraw in another direction without losing excessive casualties to the Confederates."

In a retrospective review in Issue 20 of ′′Simulacrum′′, Steve Newberg, Peter Bartlett and Luc Olivier commented, "As with every game of this scale, the historical value is low, but for Road to Richmond it is not absent. The game is not very well balanced, but quickly learned and played, so not all is lost."

== Other reviews and commentary ==
- Fire & Movement #85
- Outpost #8
