= Winter War: The Russo-Finnish Conflict =

1972 World War II board wargame

Cover of the boxed set, 1972

Winter War: The Russo-Finnish Conflict is a board wargame published by Simulations Publications Inc. (SPI) in 1972 that simulates the Soviet Union's 1939 invasion of Finland during World War II.

== Background ==
On 30 November 1939, three months after the Nazi-Soviet invasion of Poland that precipitated World War II, the Soviet Union invaded Finland. The subsequent conflict, known as the "Winter War" or the First Soviet-Finnish War, was not a walk-over by the Soviet Union despite superior military strength, especially in tanks and aircraft. The Soviet Union suffered severe losses and initially made little headway as Finland repelled Soviet attacks for more than two months and inflicted substantial losses on the invaders while temperatures reached as low as −43 °C (−45 °F). The very poor performance of the Red Army convinced German Chancellor Adolf Hitler that an invasion of the Soviet Union would be successful, declaring, "we have only to kick in the door and the whole rotten structure will come crashing down".

== Description ==
Winter War is a two-player board wargame where one player controls Soviet invasion forces, and the other the Finnish defenders. With only 120 counters and four pages of rules, this game has been characterized as being "at the simple end of the [complexity] spectrum."

=== Set-up ===
The Finnish player sets down their counters first, but upside down so that the Soviet player does not know the disposition of strengths. In addition, the Finnish player can mix in up to six dummy counters to camouflage strategic intentions. The Soviet player then sets up their counters.

=== Gameplay ===
The game uses an alternating "I Go, You Go" series of turns, where the Soviet player moves and attacks, and then the Finnish player has the same opportunities.

A Soviet unit must attack an adjacent Finnish unit, but a Finnish unit does not have to attack an adjacent Soviet unit. In addition, before combat, the Finnish player has the opportunity to retreat away from the attacking Soviets.

Each pair of player turns represents ten days, and the game ends after 10 turns.

=== Movement ===
In addition to moving units on foot with additional terrain penalties, each player has the opportunity to move units unlimited distances by train, although only on rail lines within their home countries.

=== Geographical prohibitions ===
In the south of Finland (the southernmost 13 rows of hexes), both players can stack up to two units. In the north of Finland, no stacking of units is allowed.

The most powerful units on both sides are prohibited from operating in the northern part of the map.

=== Supply ===
Finnish units are never unsupplied within Finland. Soviet units must be able to trace an unhindered line back to a headquarters unit within five hexes, the headquarters units must be able to trace an unhindered line to a Russian city within ten hexes, and the Russian city must be able to trace an unhindered railway line to Leningrad.

== Scenarios ==
The game comes with two scenarios:

1. Basic Game: A game that lasts ten turns.
2. Special Events: This scenario uses all the same rules as the Basic Game, but once each turn, both players roll one die, which may result in special scenario conditions, such as Finland gaining reinforcements from Allies, or the Soviet Union getting all their reinforcements for the game in Turn 3. Some of these scenarios may result in a premature end to the game.

=== Victory conditions ===
The Soviet player gains victory points for capturing key objectives:

- Petsamo: 30
- Oulu: 30
- Mannerheim Line: 40
- Viipuri: 25

The Soviet player wins by earning at least 61 victory points. The Finnish player wins if the Soviet player earns 30 or fewer points. Anything in between is a draw.

== Publication history ==
Winter War was an early SPI product, designed by freelance game designer James Goff, with graphic design by Redmond A. Simonsen. The game was published as a free pull-out game in Issue 33 of SPI's house magazine Strategy & Tactics, and was also released as a boxed set.

== Reception ==
In Issue 11 of the British magazine Games & Puzzles, Don Turnbull noted the "novel rules reflecting the harsh weather conditions, and a particularly intriguing supply rule which forces the Russian player, in particular, to plan very carefully." Turnbull concluded, "A fine game which I am sure will become very popular."

In a 1976 poll conducted by SPI to determine the most popular board wargames in North America, Winter War placed 80th out of 202 games.

In his 1977 book The Comprehensive Guide to Board Wargaming, Nick Palmer used Winter War as an extensive introduction to the strategies of a board wargame, calling it an "Exciting if rather luck-dependent game." In his 1980 sequel, The Best of Board Wargaming , Palmer gave the game an Excitement grade of 80%, saying "Altogether a lively and varied game, though Lady Luck tends to dominate the scene."

In Issue 12 of the British wargaming magazine Phoenix, Richard Stephens spoke about the spontaneity required to react to suddenly changing situations, saying "For me, this is the pleasure of the game — both sides really have to think as to what should be sent where, whether to give up such and such a position and so on, thus involving strategic decisions which makes it a very interesting simulation."

In The Guide to Simulations/Games for Education and Training, Martin Campion called this game "an excellent simulation of a minor war." Commenting on its usefulness as an educational aid, Campion noted, "It is easy to learn and it shows the importance of supply, the effect of small numbers in a favorable situation and, conversely, the difficulty of making an impression with large numbers in an unfavorable situation."

== Other reviews and commentary ==
- Jagdpanther #10
- Moves #61
- Panzerfaust #61
- Fire & Movement #63
- Outposts #1
