= South Africa: Vestige of Colonialism =

1977 board wargame

Cover of Strategy & Tactics #62, which contained South Africa as a pull-out game

South Africa: Vestige of Colonialism is a board wargame published by Simulations Publications Inc. (SPI) in 1977 that simulates a hypothetical guerilla war during the apartheid era waged by the African National Congress (ANC) against forces of the Republic of South Africa (RSA).

== Background ==
During the 1970s, as world opinion began to turn against the white-only government of South Africa and its policy of apartheid, many observers assumed the increasingly fraught relations between blacks and whites would end in a racial war, with forces of the RSA trying to put down a guerilla war.

== Description ==
South Africa is a two-player board wargame in which one player controls conventional RSA forces and the other controls the guerillas of the ANC, who are invading South Africa from bordering countries. As history professor Martin Campion noted, the game "posits an almost interminable war between the black nations of southern Africa and the Republic of South Africa and assumes the former would win eventually."

=== Gameplay ===
The ANC player may attempt to conceal any units from the RSA by flipping them facedown. These units cannot engage in combat while facedown. The RSA player may attempt to detect facedown ANC units; if this succeeds, the facedown unit is flipped over, and the RSA player can attack it. If the detection fails, the ANC units remain facedown and cannot be attacked or damaged. To magnify this effect, the ANC player can also place dummy units facedown on the board.

Otherwise, the game plays in alternating turns like many board wargames of the time, with each player having an opportunity to move and attack.

A Strategic Turn happens once a season (each 13 turns). The RSA gets reinforcements, but must also set a taxation rate for the white citizens of South Africa that will pay for the number of military forces desired for the coming season. If the taxation rate becomes too high, citizens will start to emigrate out of South Africa, reducing the Manpower pool available.

=== Victory conditions ===
If the ANC player controls seven or more Town hexes and one City hex with face-up units at the start of a Strategic Turn, then the ANC player is the winner.

The rules of the game state that "no R.S.A. victory is possible" and suggest that the players play two games, with players changing sides for the second game; the ANC player who wins in a shorter number of turns is declared the winner.

== Publication history ==
South Africa was designed by Irad B. Hardy, with graphic design by Redmond A. Simonsen, and was published in 1977 as a free pull-out game in Issue 62 of SPI's house magazine Strategy & Tactics. The game was also released as a boxed set.

The premise of the game that revolution would happen soon was not seen as unlikely at the time; few foresaw that apartheid would last through the 1980s, nor that it would fall due to a negotiated political settlement in 1991. Game critic Nicky Palmer, writing in 1977, agreed with the general consensus that conflict would occur in the near future, commenting "The game is likely to be partially overtaken by events."

Despite this, the game failed to gain an audience and did not crack SPI's Top Ten Bestselling Games list.

== Reception ==
Game critic Nicky Palmer interviewed both a military attache posted to the South African embassy in London as well as a representative of the ANC to get their opinions on how accurate South Africa was as a simulation. Palmer wrote, "They both thought the map was good and the units looked reasonably accurate but the [South African] attache didn't fancy the victory conditions (which rule out a permanent apartheid victory), while the ANC representative poured scorn on the conventional assumptions of the game, which is based on an invasion from neighbouring countries rather than a straight guerilla war."

In The Guide to Simulations/Games for Education and Training, Martin Campion noted the many rules that "cover various kinds of combat, taxation, mobilization of new units, demobilization of existing units, manpower, and assorted international events that could alter the situation."

== Other reviews and commentary ==
- Moves #34
- The Canadian Wargaming Journal #31
