= Soldiers: Tactical Combat in 1914–15 =

1971 World War II board wargame

Soldiers: Tactical Combat in 1914–15 is a board wargame published by Simulations Publications Inc. (SPI) in 1972 that simulates the early months of World War I when combatants experienced a degree of mobility before the onset of trench warfare. The game enjoyed positive reviews, and was credited as the influential predecessor of popular tactical games such as Sniper!, StarSoldier, and the bestselling Squad Leader.

== Background ==
In the opening months of World War I, generals had the geographical freedom to maneuver their armies using massed assault tactics designed for 18th- and 19th-century combat. However, the use of modern weaponry such as machine guns, high-explosive fragmentation shells and mortars, even in limited supply during the opening days of the war, caused unprecedented casualties numbering hundreds of thousands on all sides. As a result, all combatants took cover in trenches, creating an attritional stalemate that would become the hallmark of the entire war.

== Description ==
Soldiers is a two-player board wargame where one player controls Allied forces and the other player controls German and Austro-Hungarian forces. The single hex grid map used for all scenarios is scaled at 100 m (110 yds) per hex and features a variety of terrain, including wooded hexes, a hill, roads and a river; however, most of the central part of the board is open terrain.

The game comes with 200 counters representing six nations (British, French, Russian, Belgian, German and Austro-Hungarian) but only about 70 counters representing two nations appear in any scenario.

=== Gameplay ===
The game uses a simple system of alternating turns where the first player moves, both sides fire, the second player moves and both sides fire again. This completes one game turn, which represents ten minutes of combat.

=== Combat ===
Unlike many other wargames of the time where attacking strength is compared to a unit's defensive strength, in Soldiers, attacking fire is compared to the terrain in which the defending unit is situated, making it easier to hit a unit that is in the open. The attacker must also have line of sight to the defender, which is blocked by certain terrain, and also by other friendly units. This gives the defender even more impetus to seek cover behind hills or wooded terrain.

All units firing on an enemy unit at the same time are combined as one attack, regardless of whether the attacking units are close together or spread apart. The combined strength of all the attacking units is compared to the defender; those odds, and a die roll, produce a result on the Combat Results Table. At low attacking odds, the most common result is either "No effect" or "Disruption" (the defending unit is "pinned" and cannot move or attack). At higher odds, "No effect" disappears and "Elimination" becomes common.

=== Scenarios ===
Soldiers comes with fourteen scenarios simulating skirmishes on the Western Front, as well as clashes on the Eastern Front.

== Publication history ==
Shortly after Jim Dunnigan founded Poultron Press in 1969 he gave David Isby the task of designing a game about World War I. Isby took two years to research the subject, decide on a theme, create a game and playtest it with his friends. By the time Isby finally brought the game to be published in 1972, Dunnigan had changed the name of the company to Simulations Publications. Soldiers was released as a boxed set with graphic design by Redmond A. Simonsen.

== Reception ==
Contemporary critics praised the game for its realism in simulating the short period of time in late 1914 when mobile tactics were used.

In Issue 11 of the British magazine Games & Puzzles, game designer Don Turnbull liked the "Simple, yet realistic rules and mechanics, with plenty of scenarios to choose from." Turnbull concluded, "[Its] first sight is most impressive."

In Issue 7 of Moves, George Phillies called Soldiers "probably the smoothest playing of SPI's lengthening tactical series." Phillies thought the major reasons for this were the limited number of weapons, the map — "not overly cluttered with terrain" — and the simultaneous firing phases. Phillies concluded, "All situations show clearly, if the participants are careless, the devastation that could be inflicted by the weapons of the time. They also show that a cautious attack still had a good chance to succeed without extreme losses in the period before the trench lines."

Writing for The Pouch, Nicholas Ulanov thought the game was "Excellent," calling it a "Very realistic and mobile World War I game." Ulanov's only complaint was the high attritional casualty rate.

In the 1980 book The Complete Book of Wargames, game designer Jon Freeman recalled that the then eight-year-old game "was a breakthrough in design and remains a good game in its own right," noting that Soldiers was the influential predecessor of popular tactical games such as Sniper!, StarSoldier, and the bestselling Squad Leader. Freeman also commented that it was a good teaching game. "Players quickly learn the importance of reserves and supporting fire, the danger of leaving a flank open, the benefits of elevated terrain, and the value of combined arms tactics." Freeman gave this game an Overall Evaluation of "Very Good", concluding, "Soldiers is probably the best game of land combat of the period."

In The Guide to Simulations/Games for Education and Training, history professor Martin Campion noted that "This is one of the best games I have used in my classes. The rules are fairly simple and mostly logical. The individual scenarios are short. The game shows vividly the tactical conditions of 1914, before the building of the great trench lines." Campion suggested that a truly good lesson would be to have students play the game without learning all of the combat rules, mirroring army officers' lack of knowledge of modern tactics at the start of the war. "Then the game becomes a good means to teach people why wargames are a lot better for them than the real thing."

== Other reviews and commentary ==
- The Wargamer Vol.1 #3
- Battle Flag Vol.1 #25
- Phoenix #31
