= The China War =

1979 board wargame

Cover of Strategy & Tactics #76, featuring The China War

The China War: Sino-Soviet Conflict in the 1980s, or simply The China War, is a board wargame published by Simulations Publications Inc. in 1979 that simulates three hypothetical conflicts in the 1980s that involve China.

== Background ==
The China War is a two-player board wargame in which one player controls Chinese forces and the other player controls the forces opposing China, which vary from scenario to scenario.

=== Scenarios ===
- Soviet Invasion: The first and longest scenario posits a Soviet invasion of China, either through Mongolia or through Xinjiang.
- Vietnam: China invades Vietnam.
- Taiwan: China invades Taiwan.

=== Gameplay ===
The game uses an alternating "I Go, You Go" system, although the non-phasing player does have an opportunity to act during the phasing player's turn. The phasing player's turn includes:

- Phasing Player: Movement
- Non-phasing player: Reaction from mechanized and front-line units
- Phasing player: Combat

The non-phasing player then becomes the phasing player. Completing the second set of phases completes one game turn. There are no zones of control, and assaulting units can overrun defending units to attempt a breakthrough. Terrain affects both movement and combat. There are also rules for varying troop quality, specialty desert units, chemical and electronic warfare, tactical air support, nuclear weapons and Chinese mass wave attacks.

== Publication history ==
In 1979, The China War was published in Issue 76 of Simulations Publications Inc.'s (SPI) house magazine Strategy & Tactics as a free pull-out game. The game, designed by Brad Hessel, and featuring graphic design by Redmond A. Simonsen, was also published as a boxed set. The game failed to attract an audience, and did not crack SPI's Top Ten Bestseller List.

== Reception ==
With 200 counters and 12 pages of rules, The China War's complexity was rated as 3 out of 5 by critic Nicky Palmer. In Issue 44 of the British wargaming magazine Perfidious Albion, Rob Land noted, "the rules are well done and the game PLAYS." Land found the main scenario dragged a bit "but it makes for an interesting fight." Land concluded, "If this is a sample of the new SPI, then I am in favour of it."

In Issue 77 of the British magazine Games & Puzzles, Nicky Palmer liked the "fine map", noting it was "packed with detail about Chinese industrial capacity and generally making the players itching to get started." However, Palmer didn't like the very limited use of tactical nuclear weapons, saying "it gives a relatively toothless impression compared with one might expect of tactical nuclear commitment." Palmer felt the Soviet invasion scenario was the best part of the game, calling the other two scenarios "rather trivial." Palmer concluded by giving the game an Excitement Grade of 4 out of 5.

In Issue 53 of Moves, Claude Bloodgood felt that "the movement/reaction rules are the strongest part of the game system, and around this all the rest fall into place nicely." Bloodgood also liked the terrain effects on both movement and combat, "especially restrictions imposed by mountainous terrain." Bloodgood concluded "China War is a fine game-system that requires a little extra effort to master, but well worth the time taken to learn it."
