= The Crusades (game) =

1978 medieval board wargame

- Cover of Strategy & Tactics #43, which contained free pull-out game The Crusades
- Designers: Richard Berg
- Illustrators: Redmond A. Simonsen
- Publishers: Simulations Publications Inc. (SPI)
- Publication: 1978
- Genres: Medieval

The Crusades, subtitled "Western Invasions of the Holy Land 1097-1191 A.D.", is a medieval board wargame published by Simulations Publications Inc. (SPI) in 1977 that simulates the First and Third Crusades.

== Background ==
During the century following the death of the Islamic prophet Muhammad in 632, Muslim forces captured Jerusalem. By the 11th century, European ties to the Holy Land had deteriorated. Christians returning from pilgrimages reported difficulties with Arabic authorities and the oppression of Christians. The result was the First Crusade, where four main armies left Europe around August 1096, and succeeded in capturing Jerusalem. A century later, after Jerusalem was captured by Saladin in 1187, more European armies converged during the Third Crusade.

== Description ==
The Crusades is a board wargame with two scenarios; the "First Crusade" scenario is a multi-player game, and the "Third Crusade" is a 2-player game.

=== Common gameplay ===
Both scenarios use a set of common rules. This includes:

- A 22" x 32" hex grid map of the Middle East
- Combat only occurs when opposing units occupy the same hex
- Simultaneous movement via written orders
- All armies suffer losses as they move through countryside, based on speed of movement and terrain, to simulate difficulties in foraging.
- During combat, leaders determine tactics; the two sides cross-reference tactics to determine combat results.
- Sieges play a major role in the game, with the besiegers usually attempting to starve out the defenders.

=== Scenarios ===
==== The First Crusade ====
Up to seven players can play this scenario (four Christian players, three Muslim players). Although the forces on each side are nominally cooperating with each other, each leader has a different set of objectives and victory conditions.

==== The Third Crusade ====
This is a 2-player game in which one player controls the Christian forces of Richard I of England, Philip II of France, and Guy of Lusignan, King of Jerusalem, while the other player controls the Muslim forces of Saladin. Various random events can happen during the game, including the decision of Philip II to withdraw French forces back to Europe.

== Publication history ==
The Crusades was designed by Richard Berg, and was published as a free pull-out game in Issue 70 of Strategy & Tactics with graphic design by Redmond A. Simonsen. It was also published as a boxed set.

== Reception ==
In Issue 30 of the British wargaming magazine Perfidious Albion, Charles Vasey concluded, "Within the parameters of the game — small n' simple — the game is surprisingly accurate and fun ... It has problems but is well worth getting with [Strategy & Tactics]."

Fire & Movement liked the game, saying, "The Crusades are a fine mixture of simulation and playability, [and] provide a thought-provoking game."

Robert M. Citro noted that wargames of the mid-1970s started to add random events to "increase the Clausewitzian side of the equation. Random events tables, for example, can be very effective in simulating off-battlefield developments, often in the political realm, that utterly disrupt the combatant commander's plan for the front and are more or less dumped in his lap without premonition." Citro pointed to The Crusades as "a good early example" and noted that, in terms of random events, "one likely result might be: Philip Goes Home: Remove the King of France plus [all French nobles] and suddenly, carrying out the Third Crusade gets a whole lot more difficult!"

== Other reviews and commentary ==
- Canadian Wargaming Journal #34
- American Wargamer vol.6 no. 4
