= The Marne: Home Before the Leaves Fall =

The Marne: Home Before the Leaves Fall is a board wargame published by Simulations Publications Inc. (SPI) in 1972 that is a strategic simulation of the First Battle of the Marne during World War I. The subtitle is attributed to Wilhelm II, who supposedly told German soldiers in August 1914 "You will be home before the leaves fall from the trees."

== Background ==
In the opening days of the First World War, German armies, following the Schlieffen Plan, swept through Belgium and forced the French and British forces into a headlong retreat back to Paris. However, in maneuvering near the Marne River, the German line developed a gap between two armies, exposing their flanks, and the Allied forces exploited that, driving a wedge into the Germans and forcing them to fall back to defensive positions and dig in. Although a French defeat and surrender was averted, the result was four years of industrial trench warfare and millions of casualties.

== Description ==
The Marne is a two-player game in which one player takes the role of the German invaders, trying to avoid their historical defeat, and the other player controls the Allies, trying to re-create their historical victory.

=== Components ===
The game box includes:

- 22" x 34" paper hex grid map scaled at 7.2 km (4.5 mi) per hex
- 200 ½" die-cut cardboard counters
- rules sheet
- errata sheet (dated October 31, 1973)
- a six-sided die

=== Scenarios ===
The game includes two historical scenarios:

- The German Pursuit starting on 30 August 1914 (7 turns). Unusually, both players enter the map from the same map edge.
- The Allied Counterattack starting on 6 September 1914 (10 turns)

These can be combined into one campaign game of 17 turns. In addition, the game includes four "what if?" scenarios that vary the number and variety of German forces.

=== Gameplay ===
Each turn represents one day of game time, and takes the classic "I Go, You Go" format, where the German player is active, followed by the Allied player, completing one turn. Each player completes four phases:

1. First movement phase: The player can move any or all units
2. First combat phase: any unit of the active player adjacent to an enemy can attack.
3. Second movement phase: The player can again move any or all units.
4. Second combat phase: Any unit that did not fire in the first combat phase can now attack.

This double move and combat turn was unique to SPI games up to this time.

Although units can be stacked three high, reviewers noted that this is impractical due to the wide front to be covered, and also because it might allow enemy units to flank the stack, which would give the attackers a special bonus.

== Publication history ==
The Marne was designed by John Young, with art and graphic design by Redmond A. Simonsen and Manfred F. Milkuhn. Published only two years after the founding of SPI, it was one of the first games to feature SPI's "flatpack" box with an integral counter tray.

== Reception ==
In Issue 11 of Moves, Martin Campion said the double move and double combat sequence resulted in "a much more fluid game than one usually thinks of in connection with World War I. In fact it is so fluid that the disadvantaged player (the Allies in the first week, the Germans in the second) has little choice but to run like hell for most of the week." He concluded, "The game mechanics are quite simple so the game could be used to introduce new people to wargaming."

Writing for The Pouch, Nicholas Ulanov gave the game a rating of only 2 out of 5, calling it "Boring, unrealistic, and all the other bad things that go along with World War I games."

In his 1977 book The Comprehensive Guide to Board Wargaming, Nicholas Palmer noted the "Quick set-up, easy to play, rather simple map, and not a very large number of units, so one of the shorter games (3–4 hours)." Palmer concluded, "The lack of complexity makes it perhaps a little too straightforward to attract great interest."

Writing a retrospective review in 2014 on the centenary of the Battle of the Marne, Robert Smith said the 42-year old game "plays far better than one might think." He noted the lack of ambiguity in the rules, calling them "as clean as a set of rules of any game from this era." Unlike other World War I games entangled in trench warfare, Smith found "What makes this so much fun is the simple flow of the game. It’s the uncomplicated days of maneuver and open combat in World War One." He concluded with a strong recommendation for readers to look for a used copy, saying, "Few games are as fun, playable and easy to learn on WWI as The Marne."

== Other reviews and commentary ==
- Fire & Movement #65
- The Wargamer Vol 1 #3 & Vol.2 #17
- Jagdpanther #7
- Simulacrum #7
