= SPI Football =

Board game

SPI Football is a 1980 board game published by Simulations Publications.

== Gameplay ==
SPI Football is a game in which a concise 16-page rule book features famous teams from various eras, including the 1958 Giants, Browns, and Steelers, the 1968 Jets and Colts, and the 1975 Steelers and Cowboys. The game emphasizes individual football players, allowing players to select a quarterback and five receivers for each team. Gameplay involves a simple form of play-calling, with the quarterback's ratings focused on passing accuracy and the receiver's ratings on gaining yards. The game includes elements like sacks and interceptions, with detailed player ratings for different types of passes and runs. A limitation of use rule ensures strategic depth by preventing overuse of the best players, highlighting the importance of team depth.

== Reception ==
Charles H. Vasey reviewed SPI Football in Perfidious Albion #47 (August 1980) and stated that "the system is neat and is sufficiently natural to be understood by stupid foreigners."
