= Seelöwe: The German Invasion of Britain =

1974 World War II board wargame

Seelöwe: The German Invasion of Britain, 1940 is a board wargame published by Simulations Publications Inc. (SPI) in 1974 that simulates the hypothetical Unternehmen Seelöwe (Operation Sea Lion), Hitler's planned 1940 invasion of England during World War II that was never executed.

== Background ==
Following Germany's rapid conquest of France in Spring 1940 and the emergency evacuation of British forces from Dunkirk, the OKH (the German High Command) studied the possibility of a September invasion of Great Britain, codenamed Operation Sea Lion. In preparation, the Germans gathered landing craft along the coast of Normandy, and attempted to achieve air superiority over the English Channel and southern England. However, a wargame simulation of the invasion created for the OKH predicted a German defeat, and the mounting losses of German aircraft during the Battle of Britain made it clear that air superiority could not be achieved in the short term. By August 1940, plans for Operation Sea Lion had been shelved in favor of Operation Barbarossa, the invasion of the Soviet Union.

== Description ==
Seelöwe is a two-player board wargame where one player controls German invasion forces, and the other the British defenders. The game posits that both the British Royal Navy and the Royal Air Force have been neutralized, leaving the English Channel free to be used by the Germans to transport reinforcements.

=== Gameplay ===
The sequence of play is modeled on a previous SPI game, Kursk: Operation Zitadelle, which uses an alternating "I Go, You Go" turn system where both players, in sequence, get an opportunity to

1. Move units
2. Attack
3. Move mechanized units a second time.

Each turn represents two days, and the game ends after 15 turns.

=== Movement ===
British units, with home field advantage, pay no extra movement costs to move through any type of terrain. In contrast, regular German Wehrmacht and supply units pay an extra movement cost to move through hills, marshes, riversides and cities, and these terrains also negatively affect their combat die rolls.

The British player can transport units up to thirty hexes by rail, but such movement comes at the cost of a full turn to load the units onto a train and another full turn to disembark from the train once the destination has been reached.

=== Weather ===
Each turn after the first, the German player rolls a die for weather, which affects both players. The result can be:

- Normal: No effect on air or naval operations
- Rough: No effect on air missions, but German reinforcements may only disembark in ports
- Rough with zero visibility: No air missions, German reinforcements must disembark in a port
- Storm with zero visibility: No air missions, German reinforcements cannot disembark

To simulate worsening weather in southern England in later September, the possibility of bad weather increases in the second half of the game.

Critic Nicky Palmer noted that "The weather is the unknown factor which cripples the German player; every plan must allow for the possibility that a real howling gale next turn will prevent any reinforcements at all, and (just as bad) rule out the Luftwaffe's ground support operations."

=== Reinforcements ===
Both players have issues with reinforcements. The British player must bring units from other parts of England to meet the invasion threat, choosing to either have them move slowly on foot, or to place them on trains, taking a minimum of three turns to entrain, move and detrain.

The German player must move reinforcements from France, usually via naval transport, and is limited in how many units in each "wave" can be transported each turn. These units embark at the end of one German turn, and disembark at the beginning of the next German turn if weather allows. During the intervening time when units are on the English Channel, they may be attacked by RAF units if the weather allows.

Late in the game, the British forces are reinforced by Home Guard fighters who appear in ungarrisoned towns.

=== Scenarios ===
The game comes with three scenarios:

1. The OKH Plan: The original September plan that the German High Command considered involved making a large number of landings all along the south coast of England.
2. The Navy Plan: The German navy believed they would only be able to support a small number of landings focused on the south-eastern coast of England.
3. July: A gambit briefly considered by the German High Command immediately following the British evacuation at Dunkirk was to make a small landing in July and head for London, before British forces could be reorganized and re-outfitted.

=== Victory conditions ===
Victory is decided at the end of the fifteenth turn by both the number of ports held by the Germans and a comparison of strength points in England.

- If the Germans have more strength points in England than the British, then the German player wins.
- If the British have more strength points in England than the Germans, and the German hold less than five ports, then the British player wins.
- If the British have more strength points in England than the Germans, but the Germans hold 5 or more ports, then the game is a draw.

== Publication history ==
John Young designed Seelöwe, which was published in 1974 by SPI with graphic design by Redmond A. Simonsen. The American edition featured a monochrome map, and was released in both SPI's signature "flatpack" box as well as a regular "bookshelf" box. The boxed set released in the UK by the British SPI affiliate Simpubs featured a full-color map.

== Reception ==
In the September 1976 edition of the British periodical Airfix Magazine, Bruce Quarrie called Seelöwe "An interesting game with a great imaginative appeal for most British wargamers."

In a 1976 poll conducted by SPI to determine the most popular board wargames in North America, Seelöwe placed 102nd out of 202 games.

In Issue 51 of the British magazine Games & Puzzles, Nicky Palmer commented that "The game can be quite thrilling, although a really bad run of weather will dish the most carefully-planned invasion, and the odds are in any case somewhat with the British player." Palmer warned that "Newcomers will find the invasion rules rather complex, but once the first turn is completed things move swiftly and easily." Palmer concluded by giving the game an excitement grade of 4 out of 5, saying, "Seelöwe provides an exciting and fairly simple simulation of 'what might have been'. If one happens to live in the South [of England], there is an added touch of piquancy in fighting to control one's own town!"

In The Guide to Simulations/Games for Education and Training, Martin Campion thought this game was a suitable classroom educational aid for students in Grade 9 and up. He noted that "The major German problem is the weather, which interferes with land reinforcements and supplies."

== Other reviews and commentary ==
- Jagdpanther #10
- Phoenix #11
- Moves #63
