= Berg's Review of Games =

Front page of Issue #19

Berg's Review of Games (a.k.a. BROG) was a publication started by game designer Richard Berg. The magazine, which featured reviews of video wargames and board wargames, debuted in 1991.

== Content ==
In 1980, Richard Berg, then working as a game designer for Simulations Publications Inc. (SPI), started writing and editing reviews of wargames, which SPI published as Richard Berg's Review of Games. It began as a two-page mimeographed newsletter, published twice a month for 25 issues. It then appeared in the pages of SPI's Strategy & Tactics until late 1985.

In the fall of 1991, Berg became editor of a self-published fanzine, the similarly titled Berg's Review of Games (or BROG). Berg differentiated this magazine from his previous one by adding "Vol. 2" to the issue number. He published BROG six times a year, ending publication with Issue 28.

In his original Richard Berg's Review of Games, Berg had started a satirical annual feature called the "Little Mac Awards" for dubious achievements in gaming. The awards were named for the less-than-stellar American Civil War general George McClellan. In Issue #2 of BROG, Berg restarted this tradition, handing out "Little Macs" to various companies and industry personalities for perceived errors and injustices.

== Reception ==
Berg's Review of Games was awarded Best Amateur Adventure Gaming Magazine at the Origins Awards three times: in 1992, 1993, and 1995.

Following its demise, BROG was inducted into the Academy of Adventure Gaming Arts & Design's Hall of Fame in 1997.
