= Veracruz: U.S. Invasion of Mexico 1847 =

1977 board wargame

Veracruz 1847: American Invasion of Mexico
- The cover of Strategy & Tactics #63, which contained the pull-out game Veracruz
- Designers: Richard Berg
- Illustrators: Redmond A. Simonsen
- Publishers: Simulations Publications Inc.
- Publication: 1977

Veracruz 1847: U.S. Invasion of Mexico is a board wargame published by Simulations Publications Inc. (SPI) in 1977 that simulates the American invasion of Mexico during the Mexican–American War.

== Background ==
The secession of Texas from Mexico in 1845 and American designs on California resulted in a state of war between Mexico and the United States in 1846. In an attempt to bring a quick end to the war, General Winfield Scott landed an army at Veracruz in 1847 and drove inland with the goal of taking Mexico City and forcing the Mexican government to acquiesce to American territorial demands.

== Description ==
Veracruz is a two-player board wargame in which one player controls American forces and the other controls Mexican forces. There is only one scenario, which covers the entire 25-week invasion campaign of Winfield Scott from March–November 1847. Whoever is in control of the major Mexican cities at the end of the 25th turn is the winner.

=== Gameplay ===
Veracruz uses a simple "I Go, You Go" alternating system of turns, where the American moves and then attacks, followed by the Mexican player. This completes one game turn, which represents one week.

In recognition that more soldiers died from yellow fever than from battle wounds, a disease check is made by both players every four weeks.

Individual leaders are represented by counters and must be present in order for artillery to fire, and for military units to move in an enemy zone of control.

Keeping armies in supply is an important part of the game, especially for the Americans, who must land supplies at Veracruz, then transport them to American forces along a highway rife with guerilleros.

Morale is also an important consideration, since winning one battle adds impetus to the next battle. As critic Luc Olivier pointed out, "As the Battle National Moral (BNM) goes up and down depending on the battle result, a good victory can bring enough bonuses to guarantee a victory in future battles."

Rules also cover Mexican politics and American short-term volunteers leaving when they reach the end of their enlistment period.

== Publication history ==
Veracruz was designed by Richard Berg, with graphic design by Redmond A. Simonsen, and appeared as a free pull-out game in Issue 63 of SPI's house magazine Strategy & Tactics in 1977. The game was also released for sale as a boxed set, but it failed to find an audience and did not crack SPI's Top Ten Best Selling Games list.

== Reception ==
In Issue 27 of the British wargaming magazine Phoenix, Donald Mack lauded the supply rules that almost force the American player to follow General Scott's historic decision to avoid a long supply line by gathering the supplies necessary to make a dash for Mexico City. Mack concluded, "Altogether an excellent simulation of historical conditions which lead the US player to a historical answer, all achieved by supply rules."

In The Guide to Simulations/Games for Education and Training, Martin Campion noted that, as of 1980, this was the only board wargame that simulated what Campion called the war "that is important to American history but is seldom studied except as part of an introduction to the American Civil War." Campion concluded that "The flavor of the campaign is well presented in the game."

In a retrospective review in Issue 9 of Simulacrum, Luc Olivier felt the game was unbalanced in favor of the American player, saying, "in my opinion, the US player will have more chances to redo history than the Mexicans." Olivier also noted that the basic structure of the game is always the same: "The US troops land near Veracruz, they siege it for some turns until it falls. After that, they gather their divisions to follow the main road to Mexico, blasting in a few battles the large armies trying to block them. [...] After a few battles, the [Battle National Morale] problems and [Mexican] losses will guarantee a US victory." Olivier concluded with a note of ambivalence, stating "All in all, Veracruz is an interesting game to play to gain an understanding of the campaign, but it has weak replay value, and not many options for play. The rules are good, there is lots of chrome, but the action is limited.

== Other reviews and commentary ==
- Moves #35
- The Wargamer Vol. 1 #4
