= SPI Baseball =

SPI Baseball is a 1980 board game published by Simulations Publications.

== Gameplay ==
SPI Baseball is a game in which a 32-page rule book is included and a pair of dice, without the need for a board or pieces. The core rules span just five pages, with a few optional variations. The bulk of the rule book is dedicated to team statistics, covering teams like the Braves, Padres, Giants, Orioles, and Angels. Gameplay revolves around central hit charts, with dice rolls determining all outcomes. The game emphasizes the performance of individual players.

== Reception ==
Charles H. Vasey reviewed SPI Baseball in Perfidious Albion #47 (August 1980) and stated that "this is a reasonable solitaire stats game with neat rules and ideas, but the lack of board means you must keep a lot of notes."
