= The Battle for Cassino: Assaulting the Gustav Line, 1944 =

WWII board wargame

The Battle for Cassino
- Designers: John Prados
- Publishers: SPI
- Publication: 1978
- Genres: World War II

The Battle for Cassino: Assaulting the Gustav Line, 1944 is a board wargame published by Simulations Publications Inc. (SPI) in 1978 that simulates the Battle of Monte Cassino during the Italian Campaign of World War II.

== Background ==
During the winter of 1943–1944, the Allied drive northward up the Italian peninsula stalled against the German's well-prepared and strongly fortified Winter Line that included the town of Cassino. Although German forces had not occupied the ancient abbey of Monte Cassino that overlooked the town, having agreed with the Vatican not to use the historic building for military purposes, several unsuccessful Allied assaults left Allied intelligence convinced that the Germans were using the abbey as an observation post to direct artillery. In response, an Allied bombing raid against the abbey on 15 February 1944 killed 230 Italian civilians who had taken shelter there and reduced the abbey to smoking rubble. Following its destruction, paratroopers of the German 1st Parachute Division then occupied the ruins of the abbey and turned it into a fortress and observation post, which became a serious problem for the attacking Allied forces. Several subsequent assaults in February and March failed, and it wasn't until May 1944 that British general Harold Alexander devised a strategy to break through the German line.

== Description ==
Battle for Cassino is a two-player game where one player controls Allied forces assaulting the German line, and the other player controls the German defenders. The game uses an "I Go, You Go" system of alternating turns, where the Allied player acts first, followed by the German player. The play sequence for each player's turn is:

1. Preparation Artillery Fire
2. Movement
3. (non-active player) Opportunity Fire
4. Close Combat

The game lasts for 17 turns.

=== Supply ===
Supply counters must be transported from the edge of the map to a Headquarters (HQ) counter. Units within five hexes of the HQ are then considered supplied. Supply counters can be destroyed by artillery fire, forcing the other player to bring more supplies (if available) onto the map.

An unsupplied unit attacks with only a quarter of its normal strength, moves at half-rate, and cannot engage in opportunity fire, but its defensive strength remains unchanged.

=== Line of sight ===
In board wargames, under most circumstances, a unit cannot fire on an enemy unit unless it can see the unit. Most "line of sight" (LOS) rules are fairly straightfoward, sometimes as simple as using a thread stretched from the center of one hex to another to determine if there is LOS. The rules Battle for Cassino are considerably more complex. In this game, a clear line of sight only exists if $\frac{H}{D} \geq \frac{h-1.5}{d}$ where, using all distances in meters,

- H = Difference between the higher position and the lower position
- D = Distance from higher position to lower position
- h = Height of potential obstacle minus height of lower position
- d = distance from potential obstacle to lower position

Critic Geoffrey Barnard characterized this as "maybe too complex".

=== Victory conditions ===
Victory is determined at the end of Turn 17.

- Allied Decisive Victory: There are no German units in any of the 15 hexes of Cassino Abbey.
- German Decisive Victory: There is at least one German unit in Cassino Abbey, and at least one German unit in the Continental Hotel.

If neither of the above conditions exist, then victory is determined by Allied casualties.

- Allied Tactical Victory: Allies have lost fewer than 72 steps (strength points).
- German Tactical Victory: Allies have lost 72 or more steps.

== Publication history ==
John Prados designed Battle for Cassino, which was published by SPI as a free pull-out game with graphic design by Redmond A. Simonsen in Issue 71 of their house magazine Strategy & Tactics. The game was also released as a boxed set. The game failed to find an audience and did not appear in SPI's Top Ten Best Selling Games after it was released.

== Reception ==
In Issue 38 of the British wargaming magazine Perfidious Albion (April 1979), Geoffrey Barnard was disappointed in the game, writing, "This is a very interesting game, interesting only as a superb example of how great a mess can be made of a so-called simulation game. I get the impression that at some time in its life, it was a good game, but then someone trimmed it down to fit into [Strategy & Tactics], and the bits they kept included many bits that should have gone in the bin, and some of the wrong bits were thrown out. Throughout the rules one is faced with examples of great simplicity mixed in with totally out-of-place complexity, and the whole thing is a MESS." Six months later, Barnard's opinion had mellowed somewhat, as he wrote in the September-October issue of Phoenix that Battle for Cassino "contained some very interesting tactical ideas." Nevertheless, he concluded that it "proved to be a very unsatisfactory game when played."

In Issue 45 of Moves, David Bieksza liked the game, writing, "The Battle for Cassino vividly portrays the headaches of mountain warfare and the difficulties of waging a battle using numerically small forces with dangling flanks. Only with good planning and an inexhaustible supply of patience can either player expect success."

== Other reviews and commentary ==
- Fire & Movement #16 and #60
- The Wargamer Vol.1 #16
- American Wargamer Vol.6 #6
