= Crete (wargame) =

World War II tactical wargame

- Strategy & Tactics #18, featuring free game Crete
- Designers: Jim Dunnigan
- Illustrators: Redmond Simonsen
- Publishers: Poultron Press
- Publication: 1969
- Genres: World War II

Crete is a board wargame published by Poultron Press (later Simulations Publications Inc.) in 1969 that simulates the German invasion of Crete during World War II. It was the first game published in the wargaming magazine Strategy & Tactics, which would go on to feature a free game in every subsequent issue until the demise of SPI in 1982.

== Background ==
In May 1941, German paratroopers invaded the island of Crete, which was defended by British forces. The first day of battle went well for the British, and they were confident that the invasion had been contained. But their failure to guard a key airfield allowed the Germans to capture it and fly in reinforcements and materiel, turning the battle in their favor.

== Description ==
Crete is a two-player board wargame where one player controls Axis units and the other controls Allied units.

=== Components ===
The game has three small hex grid maps, each one containing an airfield (Maleme, Retimo, Heraklion), a paper sheet of 75 counters (meant to be glued to thin cardboard and then cut apart), and 4 pages of rules.

=== Setup ===
The German player secretly writes down which troops will land on which map — not exact landing places, since that is determined during play, but which map. The German player has free rein to decide how many units to deploy on turn 1, but must land at least seven battalions. Once the German player is done, the British player places units on the three maps in whatever configuration is desired.

=== Gameplay ===
Each turn uses the following sequence:

1. German landings: German player lands paratroops, lands any troop transport airplanes on captured airfields, and moves any other units already on map.
2. German attack: German units may attack any British units they are adjacent to.
3. British movement
4. British attack: British units may attack any German units they are adjacent to.

The game lasts ten turns.

=== Victory conditions ===
Both players receive Victory Points (VPs) for eliminating enemy units, as well as for any airfields that they occupy at the end of the game. The player with the most VPs is the winner.

== Publication history ==
While serving in the US Army overseas in 1967, Chris Wagner started up a wargame zine titled Strategy & Tactics. When he returned home, he tried to upgrade the zine to a full magazine but almost immediately ran into financial issues. Jim Dunnigan, wanting to save the magazine, bought the magazine from Wagner for $1 in 1969, and founded Poultron Press to be the magazine's new publisher. Looking for a strategy to promote the magazine, Dunnigan came up with the idea of adding a free pullout wargame to each issue. The first issue under Dunnigan's control was #18 (September–October 1969), and the first free game was Crete, featuring graphic design by Redmond Simonsen.

Henry Lowood, writing in the 2016 book Zone of Control: Perspectives on Wargaming, noted, "Providing a 'game in a magazine' became the defining feature of Strategy & Tactics, with the implication that its publication schedule put intense pressure on Dunnigan and his team to create games at an unprecedented pace."

Rodger B. MacGowan later recalled "This was unheard of. We had all become accustomed to one new release per year from Avalon Hill and an occasional 'independent' title."

== Reception ==
Cliff Sayre, writing in Issue 15 of Europa, commented that Crete, "offers good possibilities for a handmade game. There are a couple of ambiguous or unclear features in the rules, but the game is a nice bonus for those buying the collected back issues in which Crete appears." Haas concluded, "It probably has limited appeal for much repetition unless you play against different opponents."

In a retrospective review in Issue 17 of Simulacrum, John Kula noted, "The S&T games became more sophisticated over time, yet this first primitive effort [Crete] contained the rudiments of many SPI characteristics ... numbered rules, typical CRT, cookie-cutter units, detailed historical and designer's notes, some interesting chrome, and some last-minute additions that didn't get properly integrated into the rules."

== Other reviews and commentary ==
- Fire & Movement #60
