= The Wilderness Campaign (wargame) =

1972 American Civil War board wargame

The Wilderness Campaign, subtitled "Lee vs. Grant, 1864", is a board wargame published by Simulations Publications Inc. (SPI) in 1972 that simulates a series of battles in Virginia during the American Civil War in May and June of 1864.

== Background ==
In March 1864, Lieutenant General Ulysses S. Grant was appointed as supreme commander of all Union armies in the Eastern and Western theaters of war. Grant immediately made plans to invade the south and make for the Confederate capital of Richmond, Virginia. In short order, the Union Army of the Potomac crossed into Virginia in May 1864. Confederate General Robert E. Lee had beaten a series of lesser Union generals and was confident that his Army of Northern Virginia could turn back this latest threat. But in Grant, Lee was faced by a different sort of opponent, one with dogged determination who was prepared to bring Lee to battle again and again despite any battlefield setbacks the Union army might experience. The quick and almost continuous series of battles and skirmishes that followed in May and June 1864, from the Battle of the Wilderness to the Battle of Cold Harbor to the Second Battle of Petersburg, demonstrated that Lee had finally met his match.

== Description ==
The Wilderness Campaign is a two-player board wargame in which one player acts as Union commander Grant, and the other as Confederate commander Lee. With a complex turn sequence, and many factors to consider in terms of land, sea and river combat, rail movement, reconnaissance and leadership, the game has been described as "fairly complex."

=== Set up ===
In order to limit intelligence about troop placements, all units on the board are placed face down, and remain that way until either engaged in combat, or revealed by a cavalry probe.

=== Gameplay ===
The game system developed for a previous SPI wargame, The Franco-Prussian War (1972), was adapted for The Wilderness Campaign. It uses an alternating "I Go, You Go" series of turns, each of which represents two days. However, unlike many traditional wargames of the time in which one side moves and attacks followed by the other side, in The Wilderness Campaign, both players have an opportunity to move — Union first, and then Confederate — and then both players have an opportunity to attack; again, the Union attacks first.

There are also rules for naval combat, river combat, and cavalry reconnaissance. Supply plays a critical part in the game, since unsupplied units attack at half-strength. With the exception of cavalry, units cannot move unless they are within a certain distance of their leader.

=== Scenarios ===
The game comes with two scenarios:

- May 1864: From the Battle of the Wilderness to the Battle of Cold Harbor.
- June 1864: From Cold Harbor to the Battle of Petersburg.

Players can also play both of the short scenarios as one campaign game. There are also a number of non-historical "what if?" variants included with the game.

=== Victory conditions ===
Both sides can gain Victory Points by fulfilling certain geographical objectives and by the destruction of enemy strength points. The side with the most Victory Points at the end of the game is the winner.

== Publication history ==
SPI founder Jim Dunnigan designed The Franco-Prussian War using inverted counters to produce a fog of war. Game designer John Young used Dunnigan's rules, with some revisions, to create The Wilderness Campaign, which was released as a boxed set with graphic design by Redmond A. Simonsen in 1972. Four years later, The Wilderness Campaign had fallen out of favor — in a 1976 poll conducted by SPI to determine the most popular board wargames in North America, The Wilderness Campaign only placed 160th out of 202 games.

== Reception ==
Writing in The Pouch, Nicholas Ulanov was not a fan of the game or its hidden movement, calling it "Bulky and only slightly better than Franco-Prussian War."

In his 1977 book The Comprehensive Guide to Board Wargaming, Nicky Palmer found the game unbalanced in favor of the Confederates, and only with the help of the "what if?" scenarios was a better balance obtained. Palmer suggested players try SPI's 1975 release Battle of the Wilderness for a more tactical game.

In Issue 11 of Moves, Steve List also thought the game was fatally unbalanced in favor of the Confederacy, writing, "By the criteria of the game, the original General Grant lost the original campaign by a good margin, and it is difficult to see how it can turn out otherwise here." However, List did like certain parts of the rules. He noted that movement tied to leadership "does reflect the difficulties of communications and the cussedness of subordinates in the Civil War." List also found that "the supply system and the Union sea movement are workable and faithful to the spirit of the situation." List did warn that "There are a number of difficulties brought on mainly by hidden movement and command rules" but he concluded, "It is a tense game and a variety of 'what if' scenarios, which are included, might make it a closer game."

== Other reviews and commentary ==
- Fire & Movement #19 & #82
- Jagdpanther #11
- Battle Flag Vol.1 #28
