= Bloody April: The Battle of Shiloh, 1862 =

Board wargame

Box cover art adapted from "Battle of Shiloh: Recapture of Artillery by a Portion of Gen. Rosseau's Command", an 1862 engraving by artist Alonzo Chappel

Bloody April: The Battle of Shiloh, 1862 is a board wargame published by Simulations Publications Inc. (SPI) in 1979 that simulates the Battle of Shiloh during the American Civil War. A revised edition published in 2022 by GMT Games became the 8th installment of the ongoing "Great Battles of the American Civil War" series.

== Background ==
In April 1862, General Ulysses S. Grant moved the Union Army of the Tennessee deep into Confederate territory near Pittsburg Landing in southern Tennessee. On 6 April 1962, Confederate General Albert Sidney Johnston commanding the Army of the Mississippi launched a surprise attack that caught Grant unawares, and threw the Union army back with heavy losses. After a day of heavy fighting in which General Johnston was killed, his second-in-command, P.G.T. Beauregard, faced a difficult decision: force his exhausted Confederate troops to try and finish off the Union army, or rest until the morning and hope that Union reinforcements would not arrive before then.

== Description ==
Bloody April is a two-player "monster" tactical wargame (a game with more than 1000 counters) where one player controls the Union forces under Grant, and the other controls the Confederates under Johnston.

=== Components ===
The game includes:

- two 22" x 34" paper hex grid maps scaled at 115 yards mi (105 m) per hex
- 1200 double-sided die-cut counters
- 32-page rulebook
- Various charts and notes

=== Gameplay ===
Bloody April uses a revision of the game system that had originally been developed for SPI's American Civil War game Terrible Swift Sword (1976). In addition to the TSS rules that tracked morale and "Brigade Combat Effectiveness", players of Bloody April also have to track stragglers, the accumulation of soldier fatigue, ammunition, changing regimental assignments and strength of individual units. In addition to special rules for Union gunboats and ferries, night rules, special cavalry rules, and artillery rules, there are also optional rules for forest fires, weapons exchanges, friendly fire, and fire co-ordination.

The game uses an alternating system of phases. The first player does the following phases:

1. Union Alert Phase (Union pickets who have detected Confederate units move to alert Union soldiers. This phase is skipped once all Union forces have been alerted.)
2. Picket and Patrol Phase (Hidden pickets are secretly moved along a pre-designated path. If they "see" advancing Confederates, they will attempt to alert Union soldiers next turn.)
3. Initial Command Phase (Only units within a certain number of hexes of a Command unit may fully engage.)
4. Movement
5. Defensive Fire (non-phasing player)
6. Offensive Fire (phasing player)
7. Retreat Before Melee (non-phasing player only)
8. Melee Phase (combat in the same hex as enemy)
9. Final Command Segment (Attempt to rally routed units and recover stragglers)

The second player then runs through the same phases, completing one game turn.

=== Scenarios ===
The game includes three historical scenarios

- The Confederate Attack
- The entire First Day of battle
- The entire two-day battle

The game also provides several non-historical "what if?" scenarios.

== Publication history ==
In 1976, Richard Berg designed Terrible Swift Sword (TSS) for SPI, a complex simulation of the Battle of Gettysburg. TSS proved to be popular, staying in SPI's Top Ten Best Seling Games list for almost a year. SPI followed this up with several American Civil War games using TSS's rules system, including Stonewall (1978), Wilson's Creek (1980), Pea Ridge (1980), and Drive on Washington (1980). However, Richard Berg, designer of TSS, only created one more game using the TSS rules: Bloody April, published in 1979 with cover art adapted from an 1862 engraving of the battle by Alonzo Chappel and graphic design by Redmond A. Simonsen. The game proved popular, immediately moving to #1 on SPI's Top Ten list as soon as it was released, and staying at or near the top of the list for the next eight months.

After the demise of SPI, GMT Games acquired the rights to Bloody April. The rules were revised by Richard Whitaker to conform with the "Great Battles of the American Civil War" (GBACW) series. The result, titled Into the Woods: The Battle of Shiloh, April 6–7, 1862, was published as the 8th installment of the GBACW series in 2022 with cover art by Rodger B. MacGowan.

== Reception ==
In Issue 24 of the UK wargaming magazine Phoenix, Brian Laidlaw called Bloody April "a marvellous game, unreservedly recommended to TSS afficionados who don't mind a little extra effort this time, but one to avoid for guys who detest book-keeping in any form."

In Moves #54, Steve List called Shiloh "a morass of rule hunting and record keeping that is as fatiguing as the marching and fighting being portrayed, a strong disincentive to play." List gave the game a grade of C+, saying "buried beneath that workload is an interesting game."

In Issue 98 of Campaign, Kevin Pollock was harsh in his assessment of Bloody April, saying "if you ever needed a graphic example of carrying a good thing too far, this game would serve nicely." Pollock called the extensive book-keeping requirements "the true downfall of the game. [...] A game must be playable to be a GAME. BA is only a notch below Campaign for North Africa in its ease of play." He thought the rules were a large part of the problem, calling them "poorly written, ambiguous, meandering, convoluted." Pollock also found the game set-up, which took several hours and involved placing hundreds of counters in correct locations before the game could begin, to be wearisome. Pollock concluded, "The bottom line is that Terrible Swift Sword is a very nice game with some flaws, while Bloody April, on the other hand, is a flawed game with a few nice points. Bloody April is a detailed simulation that suffers from over design — too much of a good thing and all that."

== Other reviews and commentary ==
- Fire & Movement #83
- Strategy & Tactics #76
- Moves #49
