= Lee Moves North =

Board wargame published in 1972

Cover of game after title change from Lee at Gettysburg to Lee Moves North

Lee Moves North, originally titled Lee at Gettysburg and subtitled "The Confederate Summer Offensive, 1862 & 1863", is a board wargame published by Simulations Publications Inc. (SPI) in 1972 that simulates Robert E. Lee's summer offenses of 1862 and 1863 during the American Civil War

== Description ==
Lee Moves North is a two-player wargame in which one player controls the Confederate forces, and the other controls Union forces. The game covers two battles, the Battle of Antietam in 1862, and the Battle of Gettysburg in 1863. Both are twenty turns long. There are an addition four non-historical "what if?" scenarios.

=== Components ===
The game box contains:

- 22" x 28" paper hex grid map scaled at 7 km (4 mi) per hex
- 200 die-cut counters
- a map-folded rules sheet
- various player aids and charts

=== Gameplay ===
The game uses a traditional alternating "I Go, You Go" system, where one player receives reinforcements, moves and fires. Then the other player does the same, thus completing one turn, marking two days of game time. There are also rules for leaders, cavalry reconnaissance, fortifications, and rail movement.

The game also uses an innovative system of hidden movement: all counters are placed face down on the board, and are only flipped over when scouted by cavalry or engaged in combat. In addition, each player has several dummy counters that are removed from the board when revealed.

== Publication history ==
In 1972, John Young designed a Civil War game with graphic design by Redmond A. Simonsen. Lee at Gettysburg was published by SPI in a plain white box with a red title ribbon. SPI's rival, Avalon Hill, immediately objected to the title, claiming that they had trademarked the use of the word "Gettysburg" for all games following the publication of their 1958 game of that name. SPI subsequently changed the title of their game to Lee Moves North, and repackaged it in a "flat-pack" box with integrated counter tray and new cover art.

== Reception ==
In his 1977 book The Comprehensive Guide to Board Wargaming, Nicholas Palmer noted the relatively low popularity of the game (it polled 109th out of 202 games), but put it down to the age of the game in comparison to a long list of Civil War games that had been published after Lee Moves North.

In Issue 58 of Fire & Movement, John Setear noted with approval the "hidden movement" aspect of this game, saying, "Low unit density and highly varied unit strengths made the system easy and exciting to use, especially against the backdrop of the indecisiveness of army-versus-army combat in the era of the rifled musket."

In Issue 13 of Moves, Erich Faust pointed out that if the Union forces form huge stacks, the Confederates will be unable to defeat the stacks. Faust suggested a rule change where stacking is not allowed on either side.

In The Guide to Simulations/Games for Education and Training, Martin Campion was not sure the game was suitable for the classroom as published, saying, "Tricky game mechanics sometimes get in the way of the simulation. For class play, the instructor should exercise his option to change things."

In the 1980 book The Complete Book of Wargames, game designer Jon Freeman commented "Although the graphics are not up to the present state of the art (the map is essentially done in two colors), Lee Moves North is one of the best simulations of nineteenth-century operational warfare ever designed. It's also a tense, challenging game." Freeman acknowledged that SPI's simultaneous hidden movement system had detractors, but gave the game an Overall Evaluation of "Very Good", concluding, "If your prejudices don't prevent you from enjoying this, you may find it one of the great 'sleeper' games of all time."
