= A Mighty Fortress (wargame) =

1977 board wargame that simulates religious wars of the Reformation

A Mighty Fortress, subtitled "Reformation and Counter-Reformation, 1532-1555", is a board wargame published by Simulations Publications Inc. (SPI) in 1977 that simulates the political and religious wars of the Reformation and Counter-Reformation that enveloped Europe in the 16th century. The title is taken from a famous hymn by Martin Luther.

The game did not receive good critical reviews, and failed to find an audience.

== Description ==
A Mighty Fortress is a six-player board wargame in which players control forces of England, France (Scotland is deemed to be part of France for game purposes, reflecting the Auld Alliance), the Ottoman Empire (who in reality were allied to France against the Hapsburgs from 1536), the Hapsburgs (under the Emperor Charles V, who ruled or controlled Spain, the Netherlands and most of Italy and Germany), the Pope, and the Lutherans (a collection of German states). Each player has certain goals, mainly the conquest of cities and territories for the players controlling countries or converting or reconverting territories to their religion for the Lutherans and the Pope. Completing goals by the end of the game earns the player Victory Points. The game has twenty-four turns, each one representing one year.

=== Gameplay ===
Each turn begins with a period of inter-player diplomacy. Then play proceeds one player at a time, with the active player able to move fleets, armies and missionaries, and engage in combat (between armies and navies) or theological debate (between Lutheran and Jesuit missionaries - the loser may be burned at the stake). The active player then collects taxes to pay for new armies and fleets.

== Publication history ==
Although SPI usually used in-house designers to create their wargames, the company bought A Mighty Fortress from freelance designer Rudolph Heinze, the first game SPI had obtained from an outside source since Winter War five years previously. The game was developed by Richard Berg, and published in 1977 with graphic design by Redmond A. Simonsen, originally as a ziplock-bag game, but later produced in both a "flatpack" box and bookshelf box. The game rose to #6 on SPI's Top Ten list following publication and stayed on the list for another two months, but critics were unenthusiastic, and the game ultimately did not sell well.

In 2011, Excalibre Games acquired the rights to this game and published a new edition.

The GMT game Here I Stand (2006, revised edition 2017) covers the same subject matter and period, and acknowledges its debt to A Mighty Fortress.

== Reception ==
In Issue 23 of the British wargaming magazine Perfidious Albion, Bob Campbell found that the historical religious aspects of the time period were simplified so much as to make them meaningless. "The sad truth is that Theological Debates as such had little effect — Protestantism spread by pamphlet, and was combatted by Catholic reform in those regions where the temporal power had not gone over to Reform. Where princes had gone Lutheran along with their people, there was no chance of reconversion (within the time period of the game.)"

In the 1980 book The Best of Board Wargaming, Marcus Watney called this "a weird game." Pointing out that the game covers military confrontation between the Ottomans and the Hapsburgs, and between the English and French, as well as the religious struggle between Catholics and Protestants, Watney wrote, "This attempt to combine such disparate motives in a single game seems to me to be the cause of its overall failure." Watney criticises the weakness of the Papal player, as his main weapon - excommunication - is of no use against Lutherans and if used against Catholic players simply serves to drive them towards Lutheranism; furthermore, the Pope's Jesuit missionaries do not appear until halfway through the game. However, his biggest issue with the game was the financial aspect, saying, "To do anything costs money, and a substantial amount of money at that." He pointed out that England and France invariably pass on all actions in an attempt to save up enough money to go to war. "Thus, in the north-west corner at least, the game becomes a parody of the arms-race in reverse; neither side dare make military moves for fear of losing the strategic advantage [...] This may, of course, be realistic; it is, most certainly, boring." Watney concluded by giving the game an Excitement Grade of only 30%, saying, "It is a great pity that this game seems to lack that vital spark of excitement." However, he praised the game's detailed historical notes.

In The Guide to Simulations/Games for Education and Training, Martin Campion thought this game "has a number of excellent ideas, and it ought to be a great game and a great simulation, but it is disappointing in both ways." He pointed out that all players in the game should be part of the religious turmoil of the time, "but in fact, none of the players has any interest in the religious struggle except the Pope and the Lutherans." He also thought the game was unbalanced in favor of the Lutherans. Another issue Campion had was the lack of effect of combat, since "Military forces cannot really be destroyed, nor can they really be increased very much, so the power structure has a peculiar frozen quality." Campion also commented that armies of the time were small, and battles very concentrated, whereas this game "shows them operating on a broad front like World War I and II armies." Campion noted that the game's financial system "makes warfare outrageously expensive and any military movement almost as expensive, so players will attempt to sit out the struggle several years in a row to save money for future campaigns."

In a retrospective review in Issue 1 of Simulacrum (April 1998), Brian Train noted that "The unusual subject matter likely meant that fewer copies were sold, particularly since the reviews were less than flattering. [...] Comments like these would have been the kiss of death for any red-blooded wargamers of the time, and the title suggested strongly a game of sieges." However, Train thought that "If the truth be known, AMF is a game with great potential once the errata are incorporated."
