= Grenadier (wargame) =

Board wargame published in 1972

Grenadier, subtitled "Tactical Warfare 1680–1850", is a board wargame published by Simulations Publications Inc. (SPI) in 1972 that simulates combat during an age when musket and cannon predominated.

== Description ==
Grenadier is a two-player wargame that presents sixteen historic battles or, due to the small scale of the map, parts of battles. For example, rather than simulating the entire Battle of Waterloo, the game presents the attack of Napoleon's Old Guard against the center of the British line. Twelve of the sixteen battles are from the French Revolution and the Napoleonic Wars.

The rules are complex, and every battle uses the same 22" x 28" map of generic terrain, which is scaled at 50 m (55 yd) per hex. Attacks are defined as either "fire" (ranged weapons) or "shock" (hand-to-hand weapons).

== Scenarios ==
The sixteen battles offered in the game are:

1. Blenheim (12 August 1704)
2. Fontenoy (11 May 1745)
3. Leuthen (5 December 1757)
4. The Charge of the Mamelukes at Battle of the Pyramids (21 July 1798)
5. Trebbia (9 June 1799)
6. Marengo (14 June 1800)
7. Austerlitz (2 December 1805)
8. Jena (14 October 1806)
9. Rolica (17 August 1808)
10. Sepulveda (30 November 1808)
11. Los Santos (3 January 1812)
12. Salamanca (23 July 1812)
13. Pilnitz (mid-September 1813)
14. The Charge of the Union Brigade at Waterloo (18 June 1815)
15. The Attack of the Imperial Guard at Waterloo (18 June 1815)
16. Palo Alto (8 May 1846)

== Publication history ==
In 1969, wargame designer Jim Dunnigan rescued Strategy & Tactics from oblivion by buying the rights to it and founding Poultron Press in order to publish it. At the time, the major manufacturer of board wargames was Avalon Hill, which published one or two wargames per year with high-quality components. Dunnigan decided to see if there was a market for many more wargames each year with cheaper components, and published a series of small tactical-scale games with cheap paper maps, uncut paper counters and mimeographed rules. The tenth in this series, set in Napoleonic times, was titled Tactical Game 10. Later the same year, Dunnigan repackaged these games as the "Test Series", and gave all of them new titles — Tactical Game 10 was retitled Deployment. However, they were all still packaged in manila envelopes with flimsy paper components.

By 1972, Poultron Press had become Simulations Publications, and the company started to produce professional-quality boxed sets featuring graphic design by Redmond A. Simonsen. One of the first of these was Deployment, which was retitled Grenadier.

== Reception ==
In Issue 20 of the British gaming zine Albion, game designer Don Turnbull reviewed the original game titled Deployment, and found the game had "excellent game mechanics", with "perfectly clear and well written" rules. Although Turnbull found a few ambiguous rules, he felt that "All in all, there is sufficient flexibility in this game to satisfy the most discerning gamer." Turnbull concluded by giving the game his highest recommendation, writing "This is a fine game, interesting to play, yet quick and lively."

In a 1976 poll conducted by SPI to determine the most popular board wargames in North American, Grenadier fared poorly, only placing 102nd out of 202 games.

In Issue 7 of Moves, George Phillies noted that the scenarios were not balanced, saying, "Most of the scenarios have been constructed with care, but, as usual, with the intention of reflecting the situation, not with the intention of giving each side an equal opportunity to win. Experimentation might establish a scenario or two that are evenly balanced but anyone desiring a balanced game would do better to use the materials to make up his own situation."

In a retrospective review in the UK wargaming magazine Phoenix four years after the game's publication, Rob Gibson admitted that his reaction to the game was "a bit mixed." While he found the game reasonably suited to small unit actions in the 1700–1850 era, "it is a trifle antiquated compared to [more recent wargames], and the very limitation of the unit size prevents simulationa of most of the major battles of the Napoleonic era. A further limitation is imposed by the map, which has no rivers and few hills."

In his 1977 book The Comprehensive Guide to Board Wargaming, Nick Palmer thought that this game and its single map were too generic, and believed that "Napoleonic enthusiasts may prefer one of the many games specializing in this theme."

In The Guide to Simulations/Games for Education and Training, history professor Martin Campion wrote, "I have used this game with a small group of upper level students with some success, but the game is too complex and the mechanics are too abstract for it to be used very widely." Campion concluded, "The game shows something of the relationship between the various kinds of armies that fought during the French Revolution and Napoleonic Wars, but much of the interpretation of the tactical conditions of the period is questionable."

== Other reviews and commentary ==
- Fire & Movement #24
- Strategy & Tactics #51
- The Wargamer Vol.1 No.17
- American Wargamer Vol.9 No.3
- Battleflag V.1 No.26
