= The Ardennes Offensive (game) =

WWII board wargame

The Ardennes Offensive , subtitled "The Battle of the Bulge, December 1944", is a board wargame published by Simulations Publications, Inc. ((SPI) in 1973 that simulates the Battle of the Bulge during World War II.

== Background ==
In December 1944, German forces staged a surprise offensive through the Ardennes, taking the Allies by surprise, since intelligence had not predicted any kind of winter offensive. The initial German assault punched a deep hole in the Allied lines, and the Allies scrambled to respond.

== Description ==
The Ardennes Offensive is a two-player board wargame in which one player controls German forces and the other Allied forces. The historical scenario portrays the historical battle. Several other "What if?" scenarios are also included.

== Publication history ==
In 1969, shortly after forming Poultron Press, the predecessor of SPI, Jim Dunnigan published a complex "Battle of the Bulge" wargame called Bastogne. Critic Martin Campion made special note of the movement system "that is brilliant in its reflection of reality – it is so accurate that each game general needs a staff of two in order to keep track of movement and supply." In 1973, Dunnigan designed The Ardennes Offensive, a much simplified game, which was published by SPI with graphic design by Redmond Simonsen.

== Reception ==
In a 1976 poll conducted by SPI to determine the most popular board wargames in North America, The Ardennes Offensive placed 54th out of 202 games.

In The Guide to Simulations/Games for Education and Training, Richard Rydzel called this "a simplified version of Bastogne." Ryzdel noted that, for educational purposes, "The game still shows, like its predecessor, that traffic was a headache for the Germans. It shows further how impossible the aims of the historical offensive were."

In Issue 30 of Simulacrum, Martin Campion noted that compared to its overly-complex predecessor Bastogne, "Ardennes Offensive simplifies [the complexity] down to the point where one man on a side can handle the game. It is then a fairly accurate and playable representation of the battle."

== Other reviews and commentary ==
- Fire & Movement 65
- The Wargamer, vol 1 #3
- Moves 89
- Strategy & Tactics 37
- American Wargamer vol 2 #1
- Pursue & Destroy vol 1 #4
