= Richard Berg's Review of Games =

Magazine

Cover of Vol. 1 #19 (June 3, 1981)

Richard Berg's Review of Games was a wargaming review magazine edited by Richard Berg and first published in 1980 by Simulations Publications, Inc. (SPI).

== Contents ==
Richard Berg's Review of Games was a slim professionally produced fanzine with over 20 issues published per year, dedicated to publishing game reviews. In 1980, Richard Berg, then working as a game designer for (SPI), started writing and editing reviews of wargames, which SPI published as Richard Berg's Review of Games. It began as a two-page standalone newsletter, published twice a month for 25 issues. SPI then converted it into a regular feature in the pages of SPI's Strategy & Tactics until late 1985.

In the fall of 1991, Berg started up a self-published fanzine, the similarly titled Berg's Review of Games (or BROG).

== Reception ==
Steve Jackson reviewed Richard Berg's Review of Games in The Space Gamer No. 37. Jackson commented that "This is a good effort. I just can't pick it up without thinking 'Where's the rest of the magazine?' Recommendation: Subscribe to [Strategy & Tactics], [Fire & Movement], Dragon, and [The Space Gamer] first. If you still have time and money, by all means get this."

In Issue 50 of the British wargaming magazine Perfidious Albion, Charles Vasey commented "this 'zine purports to give accurate reviews that will save you the cash you might have spent on buying duff games ... In reality the magazine suffers from numerous problems." Vasey noted "it is manifestly stretching the ability of Berg to review games ... He admits in issue 14 to playing three games at once for testing." Vasey concluded, "About all one can say is that at least Richard is reasonably interesting whatever he writes, and his style is swift, easy and frequently witty even if somewhat philistine ... If only one could believe that the reviews were carefully considered it just might be for the hard-core addict-gamer."

== Other recognition ==
Twenty-one of the twenty-five issues of Richard Berg's Review of Games are held in the "Edwin and Terry Murray Collection of Role-Playing Games, 1972-2017" at Duke University.
