= Shiloh: The Battle for Tennessee =

Board wargame published in 1975

Cover of folio edition, 1975

Shiloh: The Battle for Tennessee, 6–7 April 1862 is a board wargame published by Simulations Publications, Inc. (SPI) in 1975 that simulates the Battle of Shiloh during the American Civil War. The game was originally part of the four-game collection Blue & Gray: Four American Civil War Battles, and was also released as a stand-alone "folio" game. It proved to be one of SPI's most popular games in the year following its publication.

== Background ==
In April 1862, General Ulysses S. Grant moved the Union Army of the Tennessee deep into Confederate territory near Pittsburg Landing in southern Tennessee. On 6 April 1962, Confederate General Albert Sidney Johnston commanding the Army of the Mississippi launched a surprise attack that caught Grant unawares, and threw the Union army back with heavy losses. After a day of heavy fighting in which General Johnston was killed, his second-in-command, P.G.T. Beauregard, faced a difficult decision: force his exhausted Confederate troops to try and finish off the Union army, or rest until the morning and hope that Union reinforcements would not arrive before then.

== Description ==
Shiloh is a two-player wargame in which one player controls the Union forces and the other player controls the Confederate forces. With a small map and only 100 counters, the game has been characterized as "simple".

=== Gameplay ===
The game system, adapted from SPI's 1972 game Napoleon at War, uses an alternating "I Go, You Go" series of turns, where one player moves and attacks, followed by the other player. The first six turns represent the first day of the battle, the seventh turn covers the night, and the last six turns represent the second day of battle. A new concept, "Attack Effectiveness", was introduced for the Blue & Gray battles: If an attacking unit receives an "Attacker Retreat" result during combat, then that unit cannot make any further attacks for the rest of that game day, although it may defend as normal.

A number of rules unique to Shiloh were also included. The most consequential for the Union player is that during the first two turns, all Union forces not adjacent to an enemy must move one hex north or northeast.

=== Victory conditions ===
Both players receive Victory Points for eliminating enemy units.

The Confederate player wins if either

- the Confederates have at least twice as many victory points as the Union OR
- the Confederates occupy Pittsburgh Landing and have at least as many Victory points as the Union.

The Union player wins if the Union occupies Pittsburgh Landing and has Victory Points totaling more than half of the Confederate total.

If neither player reaches victory conditions, then the game is a draw.

== Publication history ==
In 1975, SPI published Blue & Gray, its first quadrigame — four different games simulating different battles but using the same set of rules and the same map scale, packaged into one box. The four games were Cemetery Hill; Antietam; Chickamauga; and Shiloh. The latter was designed by Kip Allen, Irad B. Hardy, and Redmond A. Simonsen, with graphic design by Simonsen. Shiloh was also released as an individual game packaged in a double LP-sized cardstock folio as part of the Blue & Gray Folio Series. It proved very popular, and in a 1976 poll conducted by SPI to determine the most popular board wargames in North America, Antietam placed 15th out of 202 game.

Given the popularity of Blue & Gray, SPI immediately produced a sequel containing four more battles, Blue & Gray II, which also proved to be a bestseller.

In 1983, TSR took over SPI and republished Shiloh and the other three Blue & Gray games in a new reprint of Blue & Gray.

In 2008, Kokusai-Tsushin Co. (国際通信社) acquired the rights to Shiloh and the other games in Blue & Gray and published a Japanese edition in the November–December 2008 issue of the Japanese magazine Command (#83). Kokusai-Tsushin republished the Japanese version of Shiloh and the other games in Blue & Gray in the October 2022 edition of Command.

== Reception ==
In the 1977 book The Comprehensive Guide to Board Wargaming, Charles Vasey thought that the ability to maneuver in this game was not as great as the other games in the Blue & Gray box, noting that is "fought in very rough terrain, which is rather limiting".

In Issue 23 of Moves, Harold Totten outlined possible strategy and tactics for Shiloh, and noted that the Confederate player had almost complete freedom of movement in the first three turns but "you're going to need it". Totten did not like the Confederate chances in this game, saying, "The Confederate player [...] can attack the Union right and still have sufficient forces to hit the center and left strongly [but will] probably not be able to sustain the momentum of this crucial offensive."

In the 1980 book The Complete Book of Wargames, game designer Jon Freeman reviewed Blue & Gray and called the simple rules "ideal for short playing times and for introducing newcomers to wargaming". Freeman disagreed with the Union's movement restriction rules, saying, "While perhaps necessary for balance, they're tiresome." Freeman concluded by giving the game an Overall Evaluation of "Good", calling it "solid but unspectacular [...] suitable for a casual afternoon of beer and pretzels".

In Issue 54 of Moves, Steve List thought that the weakness of this game was that "Basically, the Confederates are not likely to win." List concluded by giving the game an average grade of C.

In Issue 20 of Simulacrum, Steve Newberg, Peter Bartlett and Luc Olivier thought that using a Napoleonic game system (from Napoleon at Waterloo) resulted in a game that was simple and enjoyable, but was not a simulation of American Civil War operational combat.

== Other reviews and commentary ==
- The Wargamer Vol. 1, #3 and Vol. 1, #32
- Pursue & Destroy Vol. 1, #3
