= Jena-Auerstadt: The Battle for Prussia =

Board wargame

Red background game-box edition, 1975

Jena-Auerstadt: The Battle for Prussia is a board wargame published by Simulations Publications Inc. (SPI) in 1975 that simulates the twin battles of Jena and Auerstadt in October 1806. It was one of four games that were part of the "quadrigame" (four games with a single set of rules) titled Napoleon at War, but it was also released as an individual "folio game" packaged in a shrinkwrapped cardstock folio and in a red background game box. Jena-Auerstadt was rated highly in a 1976 poll of favorite wargames, but critics questioned whether its simplicity was capable of simulating a complicated two-part battle.

== Background ==
Following a Prussian declaration of war against France in 1806, Napoleon initiated his campaign against the Fourth Coalition by thrusting a 180,000-strong force through the Franconian Forest. The Prussian army, meanwhile, awaited Napoleon's advance with a force composed of about 130,000 Prussians and 20,000 Saxons; however, these were divided into two forces near the towns of Jena and Auerstadt. Two battles developed on the same day only a few kilometers apart.

== Description ==
Jena-Auerstadt is a two-player wargame in which one player takes the role of Napoleon, and the other controls the Prussians. It is a simple and easy-to-learn game, with only 89 counters, two rules sheets, and a relatively small 17" x 22" paper hex grid map scaled at 400 m (440 yd) per hex). The map sheet is divided into two maps, with movement boxes connecting the maps, simulating the dual locations of the simultaneous battles. The counters have silhouettes on them. Many players stated that they would have preferred military symbols.

=== Gameplay ===
The Prussian player is given the option of splitting the Prussians between Jena and Auerstadt — the historical scenario — or sending all the Prussians to Jena. The game uses a simple "I Go, You Go" system of alternating player turns taken from SPI's popular Napoleon at Waterloo game published in 1971:

- The French player moves all units desired and engages in combat.
- The Prussian player then has the same opportunity.

This completes one game turn, which represents 1 hour of daylight. After sunset, night movement is allowed, but not night combat.

During the game, the Prussian player has the option of sending all his reinforcements to Jena, or can follow the historical path of dividing reinforcements between Jena and Auerstadt.

=== Scenarios ===
The game includes a historical scenario based on the actual battle, as well as several "what if?" scenarios that change the orders of battle and timing.

== Publication history ==
After the success of SPI's first quadrigame, Blue & Gray: Four American Civil War Battles, published in May 1975, the company quickly produced several more quadrigames over the next six months, including Napoleon at War, which proved very popular, moving to #5 in SPI's Top Ten Games list the month it was published, and staying in the Top Ten for the next six months.

Jena-Auerstadt, which had been designed by Tom Walczyk, proved to be the most popular of the four games, and was offered for sale as a "folio game" packaged in a cardstock folio, as a reddish background game-box for the European market, and as a "Designer's Edition" boxed set with mounted maps.

== Reception ==
In a 1976 poll conducted by SPI to determine the most popular board wargames in North America, Jena-Auerstadt placed very highly, rated 7th out of 202 games.

In Issue 1 of the UK wargaming magazine Phoenix, Jim Hind thought that the simplicity of the game and its low number of counters did little to simulate the tactical complexity of the two-part battle, saying, "As in 1806, it is the Auerstadt battle which is crucial, and here one feels the lack of a more subtle game system." Hind concluded, "All in all, Jena-Auerstadt would seem to have most to gain from an increase in complexity level; one would recommend that the number of counters could be doubled at least."

In the 1977 book The Comprehensive Guide to Board Wargaming, Charles Vasey thought "The Prussians are too fragile for good balance" and instead recommended SPI's previous publication, La Grande Armée (1972) "for a more strategic simulation."

In the December 1975 issue of Airfix Magazine, Bruce Quarrie noted that "Despite the popularity of the Napoleonic period with miniature figure wargamers, board gamers interested in this period have not been particularly well served up till now, so this game is particularly welcome." He commented that the rules were "extremely simple", but found issues with historical accuracy, saying "Unfortunately, as with other Napoleonic board games, it does not accurately re-create the tactical capabilities and restrictions of the time, and the more ingenious player will probably wish to improve the game by devising rules for flank and rear attacks." Quarrie concluded, "Overall verdict — a good one for beginners because it is easy to learn and play, but lacking the detail necessary for accurate historical simulations."

In The Guide to Simulations/Games for Education and Training, Martin Campion commented, "The game is fast-moving and suggestive of the strategic situation of the original battle. The tactical system is not very realistic but tends to give realistic general results." Campion concluded, "The game maps are excellent. The game is simple and makes a good introductory game."

In Issue 53 of Moves, Ian Chadwick commented that this was "The fastest of the [four games] and quite enjoyable [...] it plays well and makes for a good, very quick game. Playability: A, Historical accuracy: C."

== Other reviews and commentary ==
- Fire & Movement #24
- The American Wargamer Vol.3 #8
- Simulacrum #20
