= Fredericksburg: The Union Repulsed =

Board wargame published in 1975

Fredericksburg: The Union Repulsed is a board wargame published by Simulations Publications, Inc. (SPI) in 1975 that simulates the Battle of Fredericksburg during the American Civil War. The game was originally part of the four-game collection Blue & Gray II, and was also released as a stand-alone "folio" game.

== Background ==
In November 1862, Union Maj. Gen. Ambrose Burnside planned to cross the Rappahannock River at Fredericksburg, Virginia and make a lightning strike at the Confederate capital of Richmond before the Confederate army could intervene. However, the pontoon bridges Burnside needed to cross the river did not arrive until December, and by that time, Confederate general Robert E. Lee's army had dug into strong defensive positions overlooking the city. Burnside's forces were forced to cross the river under fire and then make frontal assaults against the entrenched Confederates.

== Description ==
Fredericksburg is a two-player wargame where one player controls the Union forces and the other player controls the Confederate forces. With a small map and only 100 counters, the game has been characterized as "simple".

=== Gameplay ===
The game system, adapted from SPI's 1972 game Napoleon at War, uses an alternating "I Go, You Go" series of turns, where one player moves and attacks, followed by the other player. Each turn represents 1–2 hours of game time, and the battle lasts two days.

To represent ambiguous orders from Union headquarters, the Union player can only move fifteen units per turn. In addition, all Union units on the eastern side of the Rappahannock cannot move until certain conditions are met.

Units are surrounded by a zone of control — enemy units entering the zone of control can move no further, and cannot leave the zone of control except through combat.

A new concept, "Attack Effectiveness", was introduced as an optional rule for the Blue & Gray battles: If an attacking unit receives an "Attacker Retreat" result during combat, then that unit cannot make any further attacks for the rest of that game day, although it may defend as normal.

The game includes a set of rules, "The Grand Chancellorsville Option", that enables the players to combine this game with another game in the Blue & Gray II box, Hooker and Lee, the two battles being part of Hooker's Chancellorsville campaign.

The game also includes a second scenario, involving a diversionary attack on Fredericksburg that happened in May 1863.

== Publication history ==
In 1975, SPI published Blue & Gray: Four American Civil War Battles, its first quadrigame — four different battles using the same set of rules, packaged into one box. The concept proved very popular, and SPI quickly produced Blue & Gray II, which rose as high as #4 on SPI's Top Ten Bestseller list, and stayed on the list for 6 months. The four games in Blue & Gray II were Hooker and Lee; Battle of the Wilderness; Chattanooga; and Fredericksburg. The latter was designed by Joe Angiolillo, with graphic design by Redmond A. Simonsen. It was also released as an individual game packaged in a double LP-sized cardstock folio. It was not the most popular game in Blue & Gray II; in a poll conducted by SPI to determine the most popular board wargames in North America, Fredericksburg placed 65th out of 202 games (compared to 44th for Hooker and Lee, 54th for Chattanooga, and 80th for Battle of the Wilderness.)

== Reception ==
In the April 1976 edition of Airfix Magazine, Bruce Quarrie called this game "Good exciting stuff, challenging for experienced players but basic enough to make a good starting point for anyone interested in the Civil War and wishing to try board wargaming."

In the 1980 book The Complete Book of Wargames, game designer Jon Freeman called this game "an assault on a prepared position" with little room for creative maneuvering. But Freeman thought the option to combine this with Hooker and Lee "could serve nicely as the second step in a novice's introduction to the hobby."

In Issue 54 of Moves, Steve List did not like the artificial restriction on Union movement, noting that it is "To insure that the Union player doesn't do significantly better" that the historical Union defeat. However, List liked the ability to combine Chancellorsville with Fredericksburg, saying that "This [combined] game is superior to either of its components." List concluded by giving Fredericksburg a grade of "C."

In Issue 20 of Simulacrum, Steven Busey commented "This is certainly not a simulation. However, it is a very playable game system that often demands careful thought during play. The combination of easy-to-learn rules and short games makes this an excellent alternative when time and attention are short."
