= The Battle of Nations (wargame) =

Board wargame

Box cover of the Designer's Edition, 1975

The Battle of Nations, subtitled "The Encirclement at Leipzig, 16–19 October 1813", is a board wargame published by Simulations Publications Inc. (SPI) in 1975 that simulates the Battle of Leipzig in 1813. It was one of four games that were published as part of the "quadrigame" (four games with a single set of rules) titled Napoleon at War, but was also released as a "folio game", packaged in a shrinkwrapped cardboard folio. It was popular in a 1976 poll of favorite wargames, and critics also gave it favorable reviews.

== Background ==
Following Napoleon's disastrous campaign in Russia during 1812 which destroyed his Grande Armée, the European powers opposing him (the Sixth Coalition) felt that the time was ripe to move against France. Napoleon, in an attempt to counter the Coalition with a rapid and decisive strike before they could effectively gather their forces, quickly rebuilt a new army from reservists, draft evaders, and youth and marched them into the German states in the spring of 1813. After several defeats, Napoleon was forced to fall back to Leipzig, where the Coalition forces attempted to encircle the French army.

== Description ==
The Battle of Nations is a two-player wargame in which one player takes the role of Napoleon, and the other controls the Coalition. It is a simple and easy-to-learn game, with only 100 counters, a relatively small 17" x 22" paper hex grid map scaled at 800 m (870 yd) per hex), and two rules sheets. The counters have silhouettes on them. Many players stated that they would have preferred military symbols.

=== Gameplay ===
The game uses a simple "I Go, You Go" system of alternating player turns taken from SPI's popular Napoleon at Waterloo game published in 1971:

- The French player moves all units desired and engages in combat.
- The Alliance player then has the same opportunity.

This completes one game turn, which represents 1 hour of daylight. After sunset, night movement is allowed, but not night combat. The game includes a historical scenario based on the actual battle, as well as several "what if?" scenarios that change the orders of battle and timing.

== Publication history ==
After the success of SPI's first quadrigame, Blue & Gray: Four American Civil War Battles, published in May 1975, the company quickly produced several more quadrigames over the next six months, including Napoleon at War. One of the four games included was The Battle of Nations, designed by Edward Curran, Frank Davis, and Redmond A. Simonsen, and with graphic design by Simonsen. Napoleon at War debuted strongly, moving to #5 in SPI's Top Ten Games list the month it was published, and staying in the Top Ten for the next six months.

The Battle of Nations was also offered for individual sale as a "folio game" packaged in a cardstock folio. It proved popular and was also packaged as a "Designer's Edition" boxed set with mounted maps.

After the demise of SPI, TSR republished the Napoleon at War quadrigame in 1983.

== Reception ==
In a 1976 poll conducted by SPI to determine the most popular board wargames in North America, The Battle of Nations was highly rated, placing 23rd out of 202 games.

In the 1977 book The Comprehensive Guide to Board Wargaming, Charles Vasey thought that the game was set up on "The wrong scale for the battle, but [is] a very exciting encirclement struggle."

In Issue 53 of Moves, Ian Chadwick called The Battle of Nations "Easy and fast to play. The tendency to form long solid lines and slow movement may deter those who prefer [...] more mobility." He rated the game's Playability: A and the game's Historical accuracy: C.

== Other reviews and commentary ==
- Fire & Movement #24
- The American Wargamer Vol.3 #8
- Simulacrum #20
