= Chattanooga: Gateway to Victory, Nov. 24-25, 1863 =

Board wargame published in 1975

Cover of folio edition, 1975

Chattanooga: Gateway to Victory, Nov. 24-25, 1863 is a board wargame published by Simulations Publications, Inc. (SPI) in 1975 that simulates the Battle of Chattanooga during the American Civil War. The game was originally part of the four-game collection Blue & Gray II, and was also released as a stand-alone "folio" game.

== Background ==
The Tennessee town of Chattanooga had been the focus of several skirmishes in the summer of 1863 between the Confederate Army of Tennessee under Braxton Bragg and the Union Army of the Cumberland under William Rosecrans. The result was that the Confederate army withdrew from the town, which was taken over by Union forces. When Rosecrans pursued the Confederates, Bragg's forces defeated the Union army at the Battle of Chickamauga, and Rosecrans retreated back to Chattanooga. The Army of Tennessee followed them and in September, occupied high ground around the town, laying siege.

In October, Ulysses S. Grant, now the commander in charge of Union forces in the Western Theater, arrived in the area with strong reinforcements to attempt to lift the siege, marking the start of the Chattanooga campaign. Grant's forces were finally able to open a supply line through to the starving Union soldiers in the town. On 23 November 1863, Union forces attacked the Confederates in several directions. The subsequent battles lasted two days.

== Description ==
Chattanooga is a two-player wargame where one player controls the Union forces and the other player controls the Confederate forces. With a small map and only 100 counters, the game has been characterized as "simple".

=== Gameplay ===
The game system, adapted from SPI's 1972 game Napoleon at War, uses an alternating "I Go, You Go" series of turns, where one player moves and attacks, followed by the other player. Each turn represents 1–2 hours of game time, and the battle lasts two days.

Units are surrounded by a zone of control — enemy units entering the zone of control can move no further, and cannot leave the zone of control except through combat.

In addition, the Union player is limited to moving only 11 out of 41 units per turn.

A new concept, "Attack Effectiveness", was introduced as an optional rule for the Blue & Gray battles: If an attacking unit receives an "Attacker Retreat" result during combat, then that unit cannot make any further attacks for the rest of that game day, although it may defend as normal.

== Publication history ==
In 1975, SPI published Blue & Gray: Four American Civil War Battles, its first quadrigame — four different battles using the same set of rules, packaged into one box. The concept proved very popular, and SPI quickly produced Blue & Gray II, which rose as high as #4 on SPI's Top Ten Bestseller list, and stayed on the list for 6 months. The four games in Blue & Gray II were Fredericksburg; Hooker and Lee; Battle of the Wilderness; and Chattanooga. The latter was designed by Frederick Georgian, with graphic design by Redmond A. Simonsen. It was also released as an individual game packaged in a double LP-sized cardstock folio. It was the second most popular game in Blue & Gray II; in a poll conducted by SPI to determine the most popular board wargames in North America, Chattanooga placed 54th out of 202 games (compared to 80th for Battle of the Wilderness, 65th for Fredericksburg, and 44th for Hooker and Lee.)

== Reception ==
In the April 1976 edition of Airfix Magazine, Bruce Quarrie called this game "Good exciting stuff, challenging for experienced players but basic enough to make a good starting point for anyone interested in the Civil War and wishing to try board wargaming."

In the 1980 book The Complete Book of Wargames, game designer Jon Freeman noted that Chattanooga is a siege game, and thus has less fluid maneuvering than some of the other games. Freeman concluded by giving the game an Overall Evaluation of "Good", calling it "handy but not essential, and it's not as attractive as Napoleon at War."

In Issue 54 of Moves, Steve List noted that although both sides had redoubts, most of the fighting would be done on clear terrain. List felt that even with the movement restrictions on the Union player, the game was unbalanced in favor of the Union. List concluded by giving the game a grade of "C."

In Issue 20 of Simulacrum, Steven Busey commented "This is certainly not a simulation. However, it is a very playable game system that often demands careful thought during play. The combination of easy-to-learn rules and short games makes this an excellent alternative when time and attention are short."
