= Wagram: The Peace of Vienna =

Board wargame

Cover of folio edition, 1975

Wagram: The Peace of Vienna, 5–6 July 1809 is a board wargame published by Simulations Publications Inc. (SPI) in 1975 that simulates the Battle of Wagram in July 1809. It was one of four games that were part of the "quadrigame" (four games with a single set of rules) titled Napoleon at War, but it was also released as an individual game with a set of metal miniatures. Wagram was rated highly in a 1976 poll of favorite wargames, and critics called it the best of the four games in the Napoleon at War box.

== Background ==
In 1809, Archduke Charles of Austria-Teschen of Austria took advantage of Napoleon's focus on the war in Spain to invade Bavaria, a French ally. Napoleon responded by bringing his army to Bavaria, where he defeated the Austrians. The French followed the retreating army, and crossed the Danube River near the village of Wagram. After an evening attack failed to dislodge the Austrians, who occupied a strong defensive position on the Russbach Heights, the main battle began the following morning.

== Description ==
Wagram is a two-player wargame in which one player takes the role of Napoleon, and the other controls the Austrians. It is a simple and easy-to-learn game, with only 100 counters, two rules sheets, and a relatively small 17" x 22" paper hex grid map scaled at 400 m (440 yd) per hex. The counters have silhouettes of soldiers on them. Many players stated that they would have preferred military symbols.

=== Gameplay ===
The game uses a simple "I Go, You Go" system of alternating player turns taken from SPI's popular Napoleon at Waterloo game published in 1971:

- The French player moves all units desired and engages in combat.
- The Austrian player then has the same opportunity.

This completes one game turn, which represents 1 hour of daylight. After sunset, there are two moves during the night, where movement is allowed but combat is not.

== Publication history ==
After the success of SPI's first quadrigame, Blue & Gray: Four American Civil War Battles, published in May 1975, the company quickly produced several more quadrigames over the next six months, including Napoleon at War, which proved very popular, moving to #5 in SPI's Top Ten Games list the month it was published, and staying in the Top Ten for the next six months.

Wagram, which had been designed by Irad B. Hardy, was also offered for sale as an individual game, both as a "folio game" packaged in a cardstock folio, and as a boxed set with 15 mm metal miniatures produced by Heritage Models. The wargaming magazine Simulacrum, writing thirty years after the game's publication, noted that "This fusion of board wargames and miniatures was not successful, and no other SPI games were so adapted."

In 1987, Hobby Japan acquired the rights to the game and republishedf a Japanese language edition in Issue 47 of Tactics. Another Japanese-language version was published in Issue 172 of Command magazine in 2023.

== Reception ==
In a 1976 poll conducted by SPI to determine the most popular board wargames in North America, Wagram placed very highly, rated 15th out of 202 games.

In Issue 1 of the UK wargaming magazine Phoenix, Jim Hind thought that "the simp[le mechanics are shown functioning at their best, as they do not intrude while the players are concerning themselves with strategic decisions concerning the precise timing and strength of the Austrian attack on the French left flank, and the strength of the French force which must be diverted from the assault on the Russbach [Heights] in order to meet it."

In the 1977 book The Comprehensive Guide to Board Wargaming, Charles Vasey liked the need for tactical finesse on both sides, calling it a battle "fought on a large, open plain between two fairly equal armies."

In the December 1975 issue of Airfix Magazine, Bruce Quarrie noted that "Despite the popularity of the Napoleonic period with miniature figure wargamers, board gamers interested in this period have not been particularly well served up till now, so this game is particularly welcome." He commented that the rules were "extremely simple", but found issues with historical accuracy, saying "Unfortunately, as with other Napoleonic board games, it does not accurately re-create the tactical capabilities and restrictions of the time, and the more ingenious player will probably wish to improve the game by devising rules for flank and rear attacks." Quarrie concluded, "Overall verdict — a good one for beginners because it is easy to learn and play, but lacking the detail necessary for accurate historical simulations."

In The Guide to Simulations/Games for Education and Training, Martin Campion commented, "The game is fast-moving and suggestive of the strategic situation of the original battle. The tactical system is not very realistic but tends to give realistic general results." Compion concluded, "The game maps are excellent. The game is simple and makes a good introductory game."

In Issue 53 of Moves, Ian Chadwick called Wagram "the most exciting of the games in this package. With objectives so conflicting, combat is forced on the players." Chadwick concluded by giving the game grades of A for Playability and C for Historical Accuracy, saying, "It is a good, fast and enjoyable game, perhaps the best of the quad and well worth many playings. Any player who lets it deteriorate into long, solid lines and a slugging match deserves what he gets."

== Other reviews and commentary ==
- Fire & Movement #24
- The American Wargamer Vol.3 #8
