= Hooker and Lee =

Board wargame published in 1975

Hooker and Lee, subtitled "The Battle of Chancellorsville, May 2-3, 1863, Nov. 24-25, 1863" is a board wargame published by Simulations Publications, Inc. (SPI) in 1975 that simulates the Battle of Chancellorsville during the American Civil War. The game was originally part of the four-game collection Blue & Gray II, and was also released as a stand-alone "folio" game.

== Background ==
In early May 1863, Union General Joseph Hooker moved his forces across the Rappahannock River and tried to encircle the Confederate army of General Robert E. Lee, but when Lee split his army to meet the two attacks, Hooker — contrary to the advice of his senior officers — withdrew to a defensive position at Chancellorsville, giving Lee the initiative to attack. Lee sent General "Stonewall" Jackson on a flanking maneuver while attacking Hooker's forces in a frontal assault.

== Description ==
Hooker and Lee is a two-player wargame where one player controls the Union forces and the other player controls the Confederate forces. With a small map and only 100 counters, the game has been characterized as "simple".

=== Gameplay ===
The game system, adapted from SPI's 1972 game Napoleon at War, uses an alternating "I Go, You Go" series of turns, where one player moves and attacks, followed by the other player. Each turn represents 1–2 hours of game time, and the battle lasts nine turns, which represents two days.

To represent poor Union command and control, the Union player can only move six units per turn. To simulate the flanking maneuver accomplished by "Stonewall" Jackson, the Confederate player can move up to 20 units off the map on Turns 1 and 2, and then re-enter the map on the western edge.

Units are surrounded by a zone of control — enemy units entering the zone of control can move no further, and cannot leave the zone of control except through combat.

A new concept, "Attack Effectiveness", was introduced as an optional rule for the Blue & Gray battles: If an attacking unit receives an "Attacker Retreat" result during combat, then that unit cannot make any further attacks for the rest of that game day, although it may defend as normal.

The game includes a set of rules that enable the players to combine this game with another game in the Blue & Gray II box, Fredericksburg, the two battles being part of Hooker's Chancellorsville campaign.

== Publication history ==
In 1975, SPI published Blue & Gray: Four American Civil War Battles, its first quadrigame — four different battles using the same set of rules, packaged into one box. The concept proved very popular, and SPI quickly produced Blue & Gray II, which rose as high as #4 on SPI's Top Ten Bestseller list, and stayed on the list for 6 months. The four games in Blue & Gray II were Fredericksburg; Battle of the Wilderness; Chattanooga; and Hooker and Lee. The latter was designed by Richard Berg, with graphic design by Redmond A. Simonsen. It was also released as an individual game packaged in a double LP-sized cardstock folio. It was the most popular game in Blue & Gray II; in a poll conducted by SPI to determine the most popular board wargames in North America, Hooker and Lee placed 44th out of 202 games (compared to 54th for Chattanooga, 65th for Fredericksburg, and 80th for Battle of the Wilderness.)

== Reception ==
In the April 1976 edition of Airfix Magazine, Bruce Quarrie commented "Good exciting stuff, challenging for experienced players but basic enough to make a good starting point for anyone interested in the Civil War and wishing to try board wargaming."

In his 1977 book The Comprehensive Guide to Board Wargaming, Nick Palmer called the game "Short (nine turns), but with interesting dilemmas for both sides."

In the 1980 book The Complete Book of Wargames, game designer Jon Freeman noted that the game "allows for an off-map flanking maneuver by the Confederate forces; otherwise, it is static."

In Issue 54 of Moves, Steve List did not like the artificial restriction on the Union movement, noting that "In effect the Confederate has been given the offensive ball to carry." However, List liked the ability to combine Chancellorsville with Fredericksburg, saying that "This [combined] game is superior to either of its components." List concluded by giving Chancellorsville a grade of "C."

In Issue 20 of Simulacrum, Steven Busey commented "This is certainly not a simulation. However, it is a very playable game system that often demands careful thought during play. The combination of easy-to-learn rules and short games makes this an excellent alternative when time and attention are short."
