= Chickamauga: The Last Victory, 20 September 1863 =

Board wargame published in 1975

Cover of folio edition, 1975

Chickamauga: The Last Victory, 20 September 1863 is a board wargame published by Simulations Publications, Inc. (SPI) in 1975 that simulates the Battle of Chickamauga during the American Civil War. The game was originally part of the four-game collection Blue & Gray: Four American Civil War Battles, and was also released as a stand-alone "folio" game.

== Background ==
In September 1863, the Union Army of the Cumberland under Maj. Gen. William Rosecrans had pushed the Confederate Army of Tennessee under Gen. Braxton Bragg out of Chattanooga. Bragg was determined to re-occupy Chattanooga, and on 19 September 1863, the two armies met southeast of the city, near the Chickamauga Creek.

== Description ==
Chickamauga is a two-player wargame where one player controls the Union forces and the other player controls the Confederate forces. With a small map and only 100 counters, the game has been characterized as "simple".

=== Gameplay ===
The game system, adapted from SPI's 1972 game Napoleon at War, uses an alternating "I Go, You Go" series of turns, where one player moves and attacks, followed by the other player. Each turn represents 1–2 hours of game time, and the game lasts for ten turns. A new concept, "Attack Effectiveness", was introduced for the Blue & Gray battles: If an attacking unit receives an "Attacker Retreat" result during combat, then that unit cannot make any further attacks for the rest of that game day, although it may defend as normal.

== Publication history ==
In 1975, SPI published Blue & Gray, its first quadrigame — four different battles using the same set of rules, packaged into one box. The four games were Antietam; Cemetery Hill; Shiloh; and Chickamauga. The latter was designed by Irad B. Hardy, Redmond A. Simonsen, and John Young. Chickamauga was also released as an individual game packaged in a double LP-sized cardstock folio as part of the Blue & Gray Folio Series, as well as in a "Designer's Collection" boxed set with a mounted map. It proved very popular, and in a poll conducted by SPI to determine the most popular board wargames in North America, Chickamauga placed 15th out of 202 games.

Given the popularity of Blue & Gray, SPI immediately produced a sequel containing four more battles, Blue & Gray II, which also proved to be a bestseller.

Following TSR's takeover of SPI in 1981, TSR reissued Chickamauga as part of a new edition of Blue & Gray in 1984, with new box art and the TSR logo, but no other changes to the components or rules.

In 1995, Decision Games acquired the rights to Chickamauga and the other games of Blue & Gray, and reissued the entire set with a new box and new graphic design, and slightly revised rules.

== Reception ==
In the 1977 book The Comprehensive Guide to Board Wargaming, Charles Vasey noted that the theme of the game was a "simple tactical surround-and-destroy system."

In Issue 23 of Moves, Jay Nelson called Chickamauga "a simple game that portrays a rather complex situation, while at the same time offering interesting challenges to both sides." After a lengthy analysis of strategies, Nelson concluded, "It will come down to exploiting specific weaknesses and strengths that will be unique to each game."

In the 1980 book The Complete Book of Wargames, game designer Jon Freeman reviewed Blue & Gray and noted that the game was unbalanced in favor of the Union, but called the simple rules "ideal for short playing times and for introducing newcomers to wargaming." Freeman thought Chickamauga was the most fluid of the four games in the Blue & Gray box, and more interesting than any of the games in Blue & Gray II. Freeman concluded by giving the game an Overall Evaluation of "Good", calling it "solid but unspectacular [...] suitable for a casual afternoon of beer and pretzels."

In Issue 54 of Moves, Steve List called Chickamauga "easily the best of the B&Gs [...] exciting and well-balanced." He commented, "Fairly low unit density, combined with the numerous choke points on the map, make for a game of maneuver more than head on combat." He concluded by giving the game a rating of B+, saying, "The outcome is usually in doubt to the end.".

In Issue 20 of Simulacrum, Luc Olivier commented "Unlike many games, Chickamauga lends itself to an historical treatment of Victory Conditions, to determine which Player wins. That is, the game is a naturally balanced game if we simply adopt the historical victory conditions. This game is by far the best of the four [Blue & Gray games], and comes closest to representing the flow of the actual battle."

== Other reviews ==
- The Wargamer Vol. 1, #3 and Vol. 1, #32
- Pursue & Destroy Vol. 1, #3
