= Battle of the Wilderness: Gaining the Initiative, May 5-6, 1864 =

Board wargame published in 1975

Battle of the Wilderness: Gaining the Initiative, May 5-6, 1864 is a board wargame published by Simulations Publications, Inc. (SPI) in 1975 that simulates the Battle of the Wilderness during the American Civil War. The game was originally part of the four-game collection Blue & Gray II, and was also released as a stand-alone "folio" game.

== Background ==
After a series of defeats and retreats in the Eastern Theater by a string of Union generals, President Abraham Lincoln appointed Ulysses S. Grant, victor of several notable battles in the Western Theater, to command of the Union armies. Grant decided that the way to end the war was to engage with Robert E. Lee's Confederate Army of North Virginia while driving towards the Confederate capital of Richmond. As Grant told Major General George Meade, commander of the Army of the Potomac, "Lee's army will be your objective point. Wherever Lee goes, there you will go also."

In May 1864, Grant's Overland Campaign started with Union armies crossing the Rapidan River into Spotsylvania County. The Union forces attempted to flank Lee's army by moving through a patchwork of thick forest and clearings known as The Wilderness. Lee correctly guessed at Grant's intention, and the two armies met in The Wilderness.

== Description ==
Battle of the Wilderness is a two-player wargame where one player controls the Union forces and the other player controls the Confederate forces. With a small map and only 100 counters, the game has been characterized as "simple".

=== Gameplay ===
The game system, adapted from SPI's 1972 game Napoleon at War, uses an alternating "I Go, You Go" series of turns, where one player moves and attacks, followed by the other player. Each turn represents 1–2 hours of game time, and the game lasts two days.

Units are surrounded by a zone of control — enemy units entering the zone of control can move no further, and cannot leave the zone of control except through combat.

Movement of Union units on the first day of battle is restricted to roads an trails through wooded areas, reducing the Union player's ability to maneuver. On the second day, Union forces can enter forest hexes that are beside roads or trails. In contrast, Confederate forces travel on trails as if they were roads, and in forests as if they were trails.

A new concept, "Attack Effectiveness", was introduced as an optional rule for the Blue & Gray battles: If an attacking unit receives an "Attacker Retreat" result during combat, then that unit cannot make any further attacks for the rest of that game day, although it may defend as normal.

== Publication history ==
In 1975, SPI published Blue & Gray: Four American Civil War Battles, its first quadrigame — four different battles using the same set of rules, packaged into one box. The concept proved very popular, and SPI quickly produced Blue & Gray II, which rose as high as #4 on SPI's Top Ten Bestseller list, and stayed on the list for 6 months. The four games in Blue & Gray II were Fredericksburg; Hooker and Lee; Chattanooga; and Battle of the Wilderness The latter was designed by Linda Mosca, with graphic design by Redmond A. Simonsen. It was also released as an individual game packaged in a double LP-sized cardstock folio. Linda Mosca, at the time, was the only woman in a creative role in the North American board wargame industry, and with this publication, became the first woman to author a board wargame.

It proved to be the least popular game in Blue & Gray II; in a poll conducted by SPI to determine the most popular board wargames in North America, Battle of the Wilderness placed 80th out of 202 games (compared to 54th for Chattanooga, 65th for Fredericksburg, and 44th for Hooker and Lee.)

== Reception ==
In the April 1976 edition of Airfix Magazine, Bruce Quarrie called this game "Good exciting stuff, challenging for experienced players but basic enough to make a good starting point for anyone interested in the Civil War and wishing to try board wargaming."

In the 1980 book The Complete Book of Wargames, game designer Jon Freeman noted that of all the games in Blue & Gray II, "Battle of the Wilderness features the only fluid situation, but even there the Union player must contend with movement restrictions imposed by the rules." Freeman concluded by giving the game an Overall Evaluation of "Good", calling it "handy but not essential, and it's not as attractive as Napoleon at War."

In Issue 54 of Moves, Steve List thought that Battle of the Wilderness was the weakest of the four Blue & Gray II games, pointing out that the difference in Union and Confederate mobility meant that Confederate forces could conduct surgical strikes on Union forces, which was quite unlike the historic battle, described by List as "an inchoate brawl that eventually died out due to mutual exhaustion." List concluded by giving the game a grade of D minus.

In Issue 20 of Simulacrum, Steven Busey commented "This is certainly not a simulation. However, it is a very playable game system that often demands careful thought during play. The combination of easy-to-learn rules and short games makes this an excellent alternative when time and attention are short."

In the book Feminist War Games?, Anastasia Salter examined the role of women in the wargame industry from a feminist perspective, and noted that with the publication of this game, Mosca became the first published female wargame designer. "The game is certainly not recognizable as a feminist work, as its mechanics are traditional, but its existence itself is significant."
