= Antietam: The Bloodiest Day, 17 September 1862 =

Board wargame published in 1975

Cover of folio edition, 1975

Antietam: The Bloodiest Day, 17 September 1862 is a board wargame published by Simulations Publications, Inc. (SPI) in 1975 that simulates the Battle of Antietam during the American Civil War. The game was originally part of the four-game collection Blue & Gray: Four American Civil War Battles, and was also released as a stand-alone "folio" game. It proved to be one of SPI's most popular games in the year following its publication.

== Background ==
On 30 August 1862, Confederate General Robert E. Lee's Army of Northern Virginia won the Second Battle of Bull Run in the Confederate state of Virginia only a few miles from the border of the Union state of Maryland. Confederate leadership believed that a battlefield victory on Union territory might win international recognition and financial support, so on September 3, the Confederate army crossed over into Maryland and moved towards Baltimore. On September 17, they were met by the Army of the Potomac commanded by Major General George B. McClellan. Lee arrayed his army in strong defensive positions around the town of Sharpsburg, behind Antietam Creek. Due to miscommunications in the Union command structure, the numerically superior Union army attacked in an uncoordinated fashion from several directions. What followed was the bloodiest day in American history, with a combined tally of 22,717 dead, wounded, or missing.

== Description ==
Antietam is a two-player wargame in which one player controls the Union forces and the other player controls the Confederate forces. With a small map and only 100 counters, the game has been characterized as "simple".

=== Gameplay ===
The game system, adapted from SPI's 1972 game Napoleon at War, uses an alternating "I Go, You Go" series of turns, where one player moves and attacks, followed by the other player. Each turn represents 1–2 hours of game time, and the game lasts for ten turns. A new concept, "Attack Effectiveness", was introduced for the Blue & Gray battles: If an attacking unit receives an "Attacker Retreat" result during combat, then that unit cannot make any further attacks for the rest of that game day, although it may defend as normal.

A number of rules unique to Antietam were also included. One of them limited the number of Union units that could move to fifteen in the first turn and only ten in each following turn, in order to emulate the disorganization of the Union command structure at that time.

=== Victory conditions ===
Both players receive Victory Points for eliminating enemy units. (If, at the end of the game, any Confederate units cannot draw a line that is free of interceding Union units to Botelers Ford, they care considered eliminated for the purpose of calculating Union Victory Points.) In addition, if one side is in control of all four hexes of Sharpsburg at the end of the game, that player receives extra Victory Points.

== Publication history ==
In 1975, SPI published Blue & Gray, its first quadrigame — four different games simulating different battles but using the same set of rules and the same map scale, packaged into one box. The four games were Cemetery Hill, Shiloh: The Battle for Tennessee, 6–7 April 1862 ; Chickamauga: The Last Victory, 20 September 1863; and Antietam. The latter was designed by Tom Walczyk, with graphic design by Redmond A. Simonsen. Antietam was also released as an individual game packaged in a double LP-sized cardstock folio as part of the Blue & Gray Folio Series. It proved very popular, and in a poll conducted by SPI to determine the most popular board wargames in North America, Antietam placed 7th out of 202 games, SPI's highest-rated land game.

Given the popularity of Blue & Gray, SPI immediately produced a sequel containing four more battles, Blue & Gray II, which also proved to be a bestseller.

In 1983, TSR took over SPI and republished Antietam and the other three Blue & Gray games in a new reprint of Blue & Gray.

In 2008, Kokusai-Tsushin Co. (国際通信社) acquired the rights to Antietam and the other games in Blue & Gray and published a Japanese edition in the November–December 2008 issue of the Japanese magazine Command (#83). Kokusai-Tsushin republished the Japanese version of Antietam and the other games in Blue & Gray in the October 2022 edition of Command.

== Reception ==
In the 1977 book The Comprehensive Guide to Board Wargaming, Charles Vasey noted the special rule that limited the number of Union units that could move and concluded the rule made Antietam was "a close game."

In Issue 23 of Moves, Rick Mataka and John Zseller outlined possible strategy and tactics for Antietam, and noted that if the Confederates were able to establish strong defensive positions early in the game, the Confederate player "really doesn't have to move any units at all except to beat back any Union advance. So, for the Confederate Player, the game is really static from about Game-Turn Six until the end of the game." Conversely, they noted that the Union player, hampered by the movement restriction rule, must attempt to attack strong defensive positions and concluded that prospects "are looking pretty dim for the Union."

In the 1980 book The Complete Book of Wargames, game designer Jon Freeman reviewed Blue & Gray and called the simple rules "ideal for short playing times and for introducing newcomers to wargaming." Freeman disagreed with the Union's movement restriction rules, saying, "While perhaps necessary for balance, they're tiresome." Freeman concluded by giving the game an Overall Evaluation of "Good", calling it "solid but unspectacular [...] suitable for a casual afternoon of beer and pretzels."

In Issue 54 of Moves, Steve List was not impressed by the rules limiting Union movement, calling them "a cheap out for the designer." He commented that it would be more historically accurate "to limit movement to the units of any three corps each turn." List concluded by giving the game an average grade of B−, saying, "All things considered, this is the second best of the eight games in the [two Blue & Gray quadrigames.]"

== Other reviews and commentary ==
- The Wargamer Vol. 1, #3 and Vol. 1, #32
- Simulacrum #20
- Pursue & Destroy Vol. 1, #3
