= Great Medieval Battles =

Collection of four board wargames published in 1979

Great Medieval Battles is a collection of four board wargames published in 1979 by Simulations Publications Inc. (SPI) that simulates historic battles that were fought during the Medieval period.

== Description ==
Great Medieval Battles is a "quadrigame", four thematically connected games that use the same basic rules. The four games in the box are:

- King Arthur: The mythical Battle of Camlann in 536 CE between the forces of King Arthur and his son Mordred. (Designed by Rob and Linda Mosca)
- Robert at Bannockburn: The Battle of Bannockburn between English and Scottish forces on 24 June 1314. (Designed by Anthony Buccini)
- The Black Prince: The Battle of Navarette between English and French forces on 3 April 1347. (Designed by Brent Nosworthy)
- Tamburlaine the Great: The Battle of Angorra between Ottoman Turks and the Mongols of Tamberlaine on 21 June 1402. (Designed by Dave Werden)

=== Components ===
The game box includes:

- four 22" x 17" paper hex grid maps, one for each game
- 680 double-sided die-cut counters (170 per game)
- 8-page rulebook: Rules common to all four games.
- Four rulebooks with rules unique to each game
- booklet of historical background

=== Gameplay ===
The games use a common set of rules with an alternating sequence of phases. The first player uses the following sequence:

1. Rout Movement: Both players move counters that have been routed
2. Movement: The active player moves any or all units.
3. Ranged fire: Both players fire arrows or other ranged weapons
4. Active player melee
5. Other player melee

The second player then repeats this series of phases to complete one Game Turn.

In addition to the standard rules, each game has some additional rules that are unique to its situation.

== Publication history ==
After the success of SPI's first quadrigame, Blue & Gray in 1975, the company quickly produced more quadrigames over the next four years. Great Medieval Battles was published in 1979, rose to #5 on SPI's Top Ten Bestseller List the month it was published, and stayed on the list for the next four months. Each of the games in Great Medieval Battles were also offered for individual sale.

In 1999, two of the games, Tamburlaine and Bannockburn, were re-released in Strategy & Tactics #197. In 2010, Black Prince was re-released in Strategy & Tactics #260.

== Reception ==
In Issue 45 of the British wargaming magazine Perfidious Albion, Charles Vasey commented, "Historical value [is] low as the individual battles' oddities are too subtle for the system, but it has useful elements of tactical combat. None too complex but lots of dice."

In Issue 98 of Campaign, Kevin Pollock commented "SPI has designed a nice game system to reflect conditions on the medieval battlefield while still holding on to the basic idea of the quad system - simplicity. The only problem I can see is that the game tends to be a bit slow due to the excessive number of die rolls."

In Issue 15 of The Grenadier, Ralph Vickers was not sure the rules truly reflected a simulation of medieval warfare, noting "On the whole one must conclude that medieval warfare in the hobby still has a way to go in its development." Vickers concluded "Before medieval games get into the ballpark of realism, game mechanics will have to be developed similar to supply in WW II type games."

In a retrospective review in Issue 85 of Fire & Movement, Peter Pariseau liked the game, calling it "one of the more interesting past efforts. [It] offers a number of interesting ideas, and designers have been slow to use its many insights." Pariseau concluded, "Four Great Medieval Battles was ahead of its time ... The real key to the game is in the unusual combat system and its variable rout result."

In a retrospective review in Issue 6 of Simulacrum, written over 20 years after the publication of Great Medieval Battles, John Kula considered the relatively simple and dated game and commented, "Board wargame systems have tended to become more sophisticated and more complex. In some respects, this is good, as it demonstrates a development and maturation which are commendable and healthy for the hobby. The cloud in this silver lining is the unfortunate feeling that the early games are unsophisticated and somehow beneath our dignity. This paternalism is distressing."
