= Tamburlaine the Great: The Battle of Angorra =

1979 board wargame

Tamburlaine The Great
- Designers: Dave Werden
- Illustrators: Redmond A. Simonsen
- Publishers: Simulations Publications Inc.
- Publication: 1979
- Genres: Medieval

Tamburlaine the Great, subtitled "The Battle of Angorra, 1402", is a board wargame published by Simulations Publications Inc. (SPI) in 1979 that was one of the games in the Great Medieval Battles "quadrigame" — a set of four thematically linked games that use the same set of rules. The game simulates the Battle of Angorra in 1402.

== Background ==
In the last decade of the 14th century, Timur, Mongol emir of the Timurid Empire (known to medieval European historians as "Tamburlaine" – Timur the Lame), expanded his territory in Central Asia, hoping to emulate Genghis Khan. Tensions arose between Timur and Ottoman sultan Bayezid I, and in 1400–01 Timur took Sivas from the Ottomans, and parts of Syria from the Mamluks. When Timur made moves towards Anatolia, Bayezid reluctantly broke off a siege of Constantinople and marched to meet the Timurid forces near Ankara.

== Description ==
Tamburlaine the Great is one of four different games in the "quadrigame" Great Medieval Battles that simulate different battles using the same set of rules. Each game also has their own set of counters, some of which are regular-sized (100 to 300 men) and some being double-sized (500 to 800 men). Some of the counters, for multi-mode units, are also back-printed.

=== Gameplay ===
Using the hex grid map, which is scaled at 50 yards (46 m) per hex, the first player uses the following sequence:

1. Rout Movement: Both players move counters that have been routed
2. Movement: The active player moves any or all units.
3. Ranged fire: Both players fire arrows or other ranged weapons
4. Active player melee
5. Other player melee

The second player then repeats this series of phases to complete one Game Turn, which represents 20 minutes of the battle. The game ends after ten Game Turns.

Tamburlain the Great also has a number of exclusive rules to differentiate it from the other three games in the Great Medieval Battles box:

- Rampant Elephants
- Naptha (Greek fire)
- Ottoman wagons

=== Combat ===
Combat, which involves both ranged and melee weapons, does not result in direct elimination of units, but effects the morale of the defending unit, causing it to gain a level of Rout. Further morale effects are cumulative, and any unit that reaches four levels of Rout is eliminated.

=== Leaders ===
Leader counters play an important part of the game, both in their ability to remove Rout conditions from a unit, and in the Victory Conditions to win the game.

== Victory conditions ==
Both players earn Victory Points (VPs) for eliminating or capturing enemy units and leaders. At the end of the game, Ottoman VPs are subtracted from Timurid VPs. If the resultant total is more than 10, the Timurid player is the winner. A result of -10 or less is an Ottoman victory. A result from 10 to -9 is a draw.

== Publication history ==
After the success of SPI's first quadrigame, Blue & Gray in 1975, the company quickly produced more quadrigames over the next four years. One of these was 1979's Great Medieval Battles, which included Tamburlaine the Great designed by Dave Werden, with graphic design by Redmond A. Simonsen. Great Medieval Battles rose to #5 on SPI's Top Ten Bestseller List the month it was published, and stayed on the list for the next four months. All of the games in Great Medieval Battles, including Tamburlaine the Great, were also offered for individual sale as "folio games" packaged in a cardstock folder.

== Reception ==
In Issue 98 of Campaign, Kevin Pollock commented "SPI has designed a nice game system to reflect conditions on the medieval battlefield while still holding on to the basic idea of the quad system - simplicity. The only problem I can see is that the game tends to be a bit slow due to the excessive number of die rolls."

In Issue 15 of The Grenadier, Ralph Vickers was not sure the rules truly reflected a simulation of medieval warfare, noting "On the whole one must conclude that medieval warfare in the hobby still has a way to go in its development." Vickers concluded "Before medieval games get into the ballpark of realism, game mechanics will have to be developed similar to supply in WW II type games."

In a retrospective review in Issue 85 of Fire & Movement, Peter Pariseau liked the game, calling it "one of the more interesting past efforts." Pariseau concluded, "The real key to the game is in the unusual combat system and its variable rout result."

== Other reviews and commentary ==
- Fire & Movement #85
