= Robert at Bannockburn =

1979 board wargame

Cover of the individual game edition

Robert at Bannockburn, subtitled "The Battle of Bannockburn, 1314", is a board wargame published by Simulations Publications Inc. (SPI) in 1979 that simulates the Battle of Bannockburn between armies of the English and the Scottish. The game was originally published as part of Great Medieval Battles, a collection of four games.

== Background ==
In 1314, Robert The Bruce, seeking to re-establish the independence of Scotland, laid siege to Stirling Castle, an important Scottish castle that was occupied by English soldiers. In response, Edward II of England raised a large army and marched it into Scotland. The two armies met on boggy ground near the Firth of Forth.

== Description ==
Robert at Bannockburn is one of four different games in the "quadrigame" Great Medieval Battles. All four games simulate different battles using the same set of rules. Each game also has their own set of counters, some of which are regular-sized (100 to 300 men) and some being double-sized (500 to 800 men). Some of the counters, for multi-mode units, are also back-printed.

=== Gameplay ===
The first player uses the following sequence:

1. Rout Movement: Both players move counters that have been routed
2. Movement: The active player moves any or all units.
3. Ranged fire: Both players fire arrows or other ranged weapons
4. Active player melee
5. Other player melee

The second player then repeats this series of phases to complete one Game Turn, which represents 15 minutes of the battle.

Robert at Bannockburn also has a number of exclusive rules to differentiate it from the other three games in the Great Medieval Battles box:

- English crossbowmen can fire over the heads of their own cavalry units.
- Several units can change mode. For example, cavalry can dismount and become infantry. When this happens, the unit's counter is flipped over, revealing their new attack and defensive strength.
- Scottish pike units known as "schiltrons" can be used in open formation — less affected by archery fire — or in closed formation, which is highly effective versus cavalry.

=== Combat ===
Combat, which involves both ranged and melee weapons, does not result in direct elimination of units, but effects the morale of the defending unit, causing it to gain a level of Rout. Further morale effects are cumulative, and any unit that reaches four levels of Rout is eliminated.

=== Leaders ===
Leader counters play an important part of the game, both in their ability to remove Rout conditions from a unit, and in the Victory Conditions to win the game.

== Publication history ==
After the success of SPI's first quadrigame, Blue & Gray in 1975, the company quickly produced more quadrigames over the next four years. Great Medieval Battles, published in 1979 with graphic design by Redmond A. Simonsen, rose to #5 on SPI's Top Ten Bestseller List the month it was published, and stayed on the list for the next four months. All of the games in Great Medieval Battles, including Robert of Bannockburn, were also offered for individual sale.

In 1999, Bannockburn was re-released by Decision Games in Strategy & Tactics #197, using the same rules, but with an updated map and counters.

== Reception ==
In Issue 98 of Campaign, Kevin Pollock commented "SPI has designed a nice game system to reflect conditions on the medieval battlefield while still holding on to the basic idea of the quad system - simplicity. The only problem I can see is that the game tends to be a bit slow due to the excessive number of die rolls."

In Issue 15 of The Grenadier, Ralph Vickers was not sure the rules truly reflected a simulation of medieval warfare, noting "On the whole one must conclude that medieval warfare in the hobby still has a way to go in its development." Vickers concluded "Before medieval games get into the ballpark of realism, game mechanics will have to be developed similar to supply in WW II type games."

In Issue 3 of Simulacrum, John Kula reviewed Decision Games' reissue of Bannockburn, and noted, "The counters themselves are the best example of the differences that have occurred in 20 years of graphic development. The original SPI counters are workmanlike and, quite frankly, boring. The newer Decision Games' counters use more color and they use it to much better effect." Kula admitted that, for gamers looking for exact historical accuracy, this game fails because it "ostensibly fails to capture the full and complete details of medieval combat." However, Kula concluded that the more important point was that the game was enjoyable, saying, "In any event, let us not fall into the trap that comes with age, of forgetting how to have fun."

== Other reviews and commentary ==
- Fire & Movement #85
