= The Black Prince: The Battle of Navarrete =

1979 board wargame

The Black Prince
- Designers: Rob Mosca
- Illustrators: Redmond A. Simonsen
- Publishers: Simulations Publications Inc.
- Publication: 1979
- Genres: Medieval

The Black Prince: The Battle of Navarette is a board wargame published by Simulations Publications Inc. (SPI) in 1979 that was one of the games in the Great Medieval Battles "quadrigame" — a set of four thematically linked games that use the same set of rules. The game simulates the Battle of Navarrete in 1367.

== Background ==
In the mid-1360s, the Castilian Civil War between King Peter of Castile and his half-brother Count Henry of Trastámara started to involve other nations, with France taking the side of Henry. England opposed an alliance between France and Castile, and Edward III of England sent his son Edward the Black Prince, to shore up Peter's side. The Black Prince, backed by several great companies of mercenaries, met Peter's army near the Castilian town of Navarrete.

== Description ==
The Black Prince is one of four different games in the "quadrigame" Great Medieval Battles that simulate different battles using the same set of rules. Each game also has their own set of counters, some of which are regular-sized (100 to 300 men) and some being double-sized (500 to 800 men). Some of the counters, for multi-mode units, are also back-printed.

=== Gameplay ===
The first player uses the following sequence:

1. Rout Movement: Both players move counters that have been routed
2. Movement: The active player moves any or all units.
3. Ranged fire: Both players fire arrows or other ranged weapons
4. Active player melee
5. Other player melee

The second player then repeats this series of phases to complete one Game Turn, which represents 20 minutes of the battle. The game ends after ten Game Turns.

The Black Prince also has a number of exclusive rules to differentiate it from the other three games in the Great Medieval Battles box:

- Rules controlling English longbowmen and European crossbowmen
- How the Najarilla River affects the battlefield

=== Combat ===
Combat, which involves both ranged and melee weapons, does not result in direct elimination of units, but effects the morale of the defending unit, causing it to gain a level of Rout. Further morale effects are cumulative, and any unit that reaches four levels of Rout is eliminated.

=== Leaders ===
Leader counters play an important part of the game, both in their ability to remove Rout conditions from a unit, and in the Victory Conditions to win the game.

== Victory conditions ==
Both players earn Victory Points (VPs) for eliminating or capturing enemy units and leaders. At the end of the game, Castilian VPs are subtracted from English VPs. If the resultant total is more than 20, the English player is the winner. A result of 20 or less is a Castilian victory.

== Publication history ==
After the success of SPI's first quadrigame, Blue & Gray in 1975, the company quickly produced more quadrigames over the next four years. One of these was 1979's Great Medieval Battles, which included The Black Prince designed by Rob Mosca, with graphic design by Redmond A. Simonsen. Great Medieval Battles rose to #5 on SPI's Top Ten Bestseller List the month it was published, and stayed on the list for the next four months. All of the games in Great Medieval Battles, including The Black Prince, were also offered for individual sale as "folio games" packaged in a cardstock folder.

== Reception ==
In Issue 98 of Campaign, Kevin Pollock commented "SPI has designed a nice game system to reflect conditions on the medieval battlefield. The only problem I can see is that the game tends to be a bit slow due to the excessive number of die rolls."

In Issue 15 of The Grenadier, Ralph Vickers was not sure the rules truly reflected a simulation of medieval warfare, noting "On the whole one must conclude that medieval warfare in the hobby still has a way to go in its development." Vickers concluded "Before medieval games get into the ballpark of realism, game mechanics will have to be developed similar to supply in WW II type games."

In a retrospective review in Issue 85 of Fire & Movement, Peter Pariseau liked the game, calling it "one of the more interesting past efforts." Pariseau concluded, "The real key to the game is in the unusual combat system and its variable rout result."

== Other reviews and commentary ==
- Fire & Movement #85
