= Rostov: The First Soviet Counter-Attack, 1941 =

1979 WWII board wargame

Rostov
- Cover of folio edition, 1979
- Designers: John Butterfield
- Illustrators: Redmond A. Simonsen
- Publishers: Simulations Publications Inc.
- Publication: 1979
- Genres: World War II

Rostov: The First Soviet Counter-Attack, 1941 is a board wargame published by Simulations Publications, Inc. (SPI) in 1979 that simulates the Battle of Rostov during World War II. The game originally appeared in the "quadrigame" collection Four Battles of Army Group South, but was also released as an individual "folio game."

== Background ==
After Germany's Army Group South succeeded in taking the strategic Ukrainian town of Rostov in November 1941, the Soviet's Southwestern Front, which had been on the defensive since Germany had invaded the Soviet Union in June, launched a surprise counterattack that the drove the Germans back and threatened encirclement.

== Description ==
Rostov is a two-player wargame in which one player controls Axis forces while the other player controls Soviet forces.

=== Components ===
Rostov includes:

- a 22" x 17" paper hex grid map
- 200 double-sided die-cut counters
- two copies of the 8-page rulebook "Rules common to all four games in the Army Group South box"
- a 4-page rulebook with rules unique to Rostov
- a booklet of historical background

=== Gameplay ===
The rules system is based on the Eastern Front wargame Panzergruppe Guderian published by SPI in 1976. This uses an alternating system of player turns in which the Soviet player moves their units first, then conducts attacks. The German player moves, attacks, then moves their mechanized forces a second time. During either movement phase the German player may conduct overruns (attacks at half strength, using only units which began the turn in the same hex.)

== Publication history ==
In 1975, SPI published Blue & Gray, their first "quadrigame" — a game box containing four thematically linked wargames that uses the same basic set of rules. The new game immediately rose to #1 on SPI's Top Ten Bestseller list the month it was released. Over the next four years, SPI published 15 more quadrigames, the final one being Army Group South, released in 1979 with graphic design by Redmond A. Simonsen. The game garnered a fair amount of attention, and appeared on SPI's Top Ten Bestseller List for eight months. One of the games in Army Group South was Rostov, designed by John Butterfield, which was also released as an individual game packaged in a cardstock folio.

In 1997, Decision Games republished Rostov as a free pull-out game in Issue 188 of Strategy & Tactics packaged with Kiev, another game from the Army Group South box; the two-game package was titled Kiev & Rostov: Battles of Army Group South, 1941.

== Reception ==
In Issue 23 of the British wargaming magazine Phoenix, Paul King liked the game but found the small map and limited counters too constraining, writing, "What I would like to see is a bigger game." King concluded, "The Victory Conditions should be taken with a pinch of salt and modified as required; any player should be satisfied with a draw in this one."

Steve List wrote in Issue 50 of Moves that the game was "not in the least outstanding, and what merit [it has] is detracted from by the lousy production job. The artwork is fine, but the rules stink; both general and exclusive rules have too many nontrivial errors to be acceptable." List concluded by giving Rostov a grade of C−, noting, "It would take a prodigious German performance to even reach Rostov, let alone hold it to the end of the game."
