= Operation Star: The Soviet Winter Offensive, 1943 =

1979 WWII board wargame

Operation Star
- SPI folio edition, 1979
- Designers: Brent Nosworthy
- Illustrators: Redmond A. Simonsen
- Publishers: Simulations Publications Inc.
- Publication: 1979
- Genres: World War II

Operation Star: The Soviet Winter Offensive is a board wargame published by Simulations Publications, Inc. (SPI) in 1979 that simulates a Soviet offensive in Ukraine during World War II. The game originally appeared in the "quadrigame" collection Four Battles of Army Group South, but was also released as an individual "folio game."

== Background ==
In February 1943, the Soviet's Voronezh Front launched an attack in Ukraine against Germany's Army Group South to retake the towns of Kharkov and Kursk.

== Description ==
Operation Star is a two-player wargame in which one player controls Axis forces while the other player controls Soviet forces.

=== Components ===
Operation Star includes:

- a 22" x 17" paper hex grid map
- 200 double-sided die-cut counters
- two copies of the 8-page rulebook "Rules common to all four games in the Army Group South box"
- a 4-page rulebook with rules unique to Rostov
- a booklet of historical background

=== Gameplay ===
The rules system is based on the Eastern Front wargame Panzergruppe Guderian published by SPI in 1976. This uses an alternating system of player turns in which the Soviet player moves their units first, then conducts attacks. The German player moves, attacks, then moves their mechanized forces a second time. During either movement phase the German player may conduct overruns (attacks at half strength, using only units which began the turn in the same hex.)

== Publication history ==
In 1975, SPI published Blue & Gray, their first "quadrigame" — a game box containing four thematically-linked wargames that uses the same basic set of rules. The new game immediately rose to #1 on SPI's Top Ten Bestseller list the month it was released. Over the next four years, SPI published 15 more quadrigames, the final one being Army Group South, released in 1979 with graphic design by Redmond A. Simonsen. The game garnered a fair amount of attention, and appeared on SPI's Top Ten Bestseller List for eight months. One of the games in Army Group South was Operation Star, designed by Brent Nosworthy, which was also released as an individual game packaged in a cardstock folio.

In 1988, Hobby Games republished Operation Star as a free pull-out game in Issue 2 of the Japanese magazine Tactics.

In 2002, Sunset Games (サンセットゲ) republished Operation Star as part of their Japanese-language edition of Army Group South.

== Reception ==
In Issue 23 of the British wargaming magazine Phoenix, Paul King liked the game but found the small map and limited counters too constraining, writing, "What I would like to see is a bigger game." King concluded on a positive note, commenting, "This is not an idle game of 'pushing around counters,' the pieces of card you move have some meaning to them and care and attention must be given in any attack."

Steve List wrote in Issue 50 of Moves that the game was "not in the least outstanding, and what merit [it has] is detracted from by the lousy production job. The artwork is fine, but the rules stink; both general and exclusive rules have too many nontrivial errors to be acceptable." List concluded by giving Operation Star a grade of B−, noting, "It is the best of the [Army Group South] Quad (faint praise indeed), and essentially is one of maneuver in open terrain."
