= Kiev: The Battle of Encirclement, 1941 =

1979 WWII board wargame

Kiev
- Cover of folio edition, 1979
- Designers: Joseph Angiolillo
- Illustrators: Redmond A. Simonsen
- Publishers: Simulations Publications Inc.
- Publication: 1979
- Genres: World War II

Kiev: The Encirclement, 1941 is a board wargame published by Simulations Publications, Inc. (SPI) in 1979 that simulates the Battle of Kiev during World War II. The game originally appeared in the "quadrigame" collection Four Battles of Army Group South, but was also released as an individual "folio game."

== Background ==
In June 1941, Germany unexpectedly launched Operation Barbarossa, a surprise attack against the Soviet Union. In Ukraine, the German Army Group South overwhelmed the Soviet Southwestern Front and quickly threatened to encircle it.

== Description ==
Kiev is a two-player wargame in which one player controls German forces while the other player controls Soviet forces.

=== Components ===
Kiev includes:

- a 22" x 17" paper hex grid map
- 200 double-sided die-cut counters
- two copies of the 8-page rulebook "Rules common to all four games in the Army Group South box"
- a 4-page rulebook with rules unique to Kiev
- a booklet of historical background

=== Gameplay ===
The rules system is based on the Eastern Front wargame Panzergruppe Guderian published by SPI in 1976. This uses an alternating system of player turns in which the Soviet player moves their units first, then conducts attacks. The German player moves, attacks, then moves their mechanized forces a second time. During either movement phase the German player may conduct overruns (attacks at half strength, using only units which began the turn in the same hex.)

== Publication history ==
In 1975, SPI published Blue & Gray, their first "quadrigame" — a game box containing four thematically-linked wargames that uses the same basic set of rules. The new game immediately rose to #1 on SPI's Top Ten Bestseller list the month it was released. Over the next four years, SPI published 15 more quadrigames, the final one being Army Group South, released in 1979 with graphic design by Redmond A. Simonsen. The game garnered a fair amount of attention, and appeared on SPI's Top Ten Bestseller List for eight months. One of the games in Army Group South was Kiev, designed by Joseph Angiolillo, which was also released as an individual game packaged in a cardstock folio.

In 1997, Decision Games republished Kiev packaged with another game from the Army Group South box titled Kiev & Rostov: Battles of Army Group South, 1941 as a free pull-out game in Issue 188 of Strategy & Tactics. In 2002, Kiev was republished as a Japanese version by Sunset Games (サンセットゲ) .

== Reception ==
In Issue 23 of the British wargaming magazine Phoenix, Paul King liked the game but found it too constrained by the small map, writing, "What I would like to see is a bigger game." King called Kiev "A pleasant game, and a good introduction to the game system ... Perhaps the only criticism of Kiev is the map — everything is a shade of blue and concentrating on it for a long time is the best way to a headache."

Steve List wrote in Issue 50 of Moves that the game was "not in the least outstanding, and what merit [it has] is detracted from by the lousy production job. The artwork is fine, but the rules stink; both general and exclusive rules have too many nontrivial errors to be acceptable." List concluded by giving Kiev a grade of C, noting, "The general result is to allow the Germans to bag an enormous enemy force as they did historically."
