= Korsun: The German Pocket on the Dniepr =

1979 WWII board wargame

Korsun
- Cover of the SPI folio edition
- Designers: Stephen Patrick
- Illustrators: Redmond A. Simonsen
- Publishers: Simulations Publications Inc.
- Publication: 1979
- Genres: World War II

Korsun: The German Pocket on the Dniepr is a board wargame published by Simulations Publications, Inc. (SPI) in 1979 that simulates the Battle of the Korsun–Cherkassy Pocket during World War II. The game originally appeared in the "quadrigame" collection Four Battles of Army Group South, but was also released as an individual "folio game."

== Background ==
In December 1943, the German Army Group South in Ukraine fell back to defensive positions behind the Dnieper River near the town of Korsun. In late January 1944, before the Germans could complete their defenses, the 1st and 2nd Ukrainian Fronts attacked and managed to encircle them in a "pocket". The German forces, facing eradication as the Soviet forces tightened their grip, struggled to break out of the pocket.

== Description ==
Korsun is a two-player wargame in which one player controls Axis forces while the other player controls Soviet forces.

=== Components ===
Korsun includes:

- a 22" x 17" paper hex grid map
- 200 double-sided die-cut counters
- two copies of the 8-page rulebook "Rules common to all four games in the Army Group South box"
- a 4-page rulebook with rules unique to Rostov
- a booklet of historical background

=== Gameplay ===
The rules system is based on the Eastern Front wargame Panzergruppe Guderian published by SPI in 1976. This uses an alternating system of player turns in which the Soviet player moves their units first, then conducts attacks. The German player moves, attacks, then moves their mechanized forces a second time. During either movement phase the German player may conduct overruns (attacks at half strength, using only units which began the turn in the same hex.)

In the specific rules for Korsun, German units on the first turn only have limitations on how far each unit can move, which allows the Soviet player to complete an encirclement.

== Publication history ==
In 1975, SPI published Blue & Gray, their first "quadrigame" — a game box containing four thematically-linked wargames that uses the same basic set of rules. The new game immediately rose to #1 on SPI's Top Ten Bestseller list the month it was released. Over the next four years, SPI published 15 more quadrigames, the final one being Army Group South, released in 1979 with graphic design by Redmond A. Simonsen. The game garnered a fair amount of attention, and appeared on SPI's Top Ten Bestseller List for eight months. One of the games in Army Group South was Korsun, designed by Stephen Patrick, which was also released as an individual game packaged in a cardstock folio.

In 2002, Sunset Games (サンセットゲ) republished Korsun as part of their Japanese-language edition of Army Group South.

== Reception ==
In Issue 23 of the British wargaming magazine Phoenix, Paul King liked the game but found the small map and limited counters too constraining, writing, "What I would like to see is a bigger game." King concluded on a positive note, commenting, "The game does favour the Soviets slightly but such rules as delay, integrity and supply to pocketed units help the German a great deal."

Steve List wrote in Issue 50 of Moves that the game was "not in the least outstanding, and what merit [it has] is detracted from by the lousy production job. The artwork is fine, but the rules stink; both general and exclusive rules have too many nontrivial errors to be acceptable." List concluded by giving Rostov a grade of C+, noting, "The German stands paralyzed while the Soviet puts him in the bag, but then the Soviet is obliged to give him a chance to wiggle out. Players who are not bothered by such restrictions will find this game solidly mediocre."
