= Marengo: Napoleon in Italy, 14 June 1800 =

Board wargame

Cover of folio edition, 1975

Marengo: Napoleon in Italy, 14 June 1800 is a board wargame published by Simulations Publications Inc. (SPI) in 1975 as one of four games packaged together in the Napoleon at War "quadrigame" (a game box that contains four separate games using one set of common rules). Marengo was also released as a separate game the same year. The game simulates the Battle of Marengo between Austrian and French forces.

== Background ==
In early 1800, Napoleon Bonaparte, the First Consul of France, was fighting for his political life and needed a strong victory in his Italian campaign against Austria. Seeking to besiege an Austrian army defending Alessandria on 14 June 1800, Bonaparte instead was surprised when Austrian general Michael von Melas sent his army out of the city on a sortie against the French. For a time, the Austrians drove the French back and threatened to overcome them, until a French relief force under Louis Desaix arrived in the afternoon and tilted the balance in favor of the French. Desaix was killed in the battle.

== Description ==
Marengo is a two-player wargame in which one player takes the role of Napoleon, and the other takes the role of Melas. The game lasts for 14 turns.

=== Components ===
The folio edition includes:

- 17" x 22" paper hex grid map scaled at 800 m (870 yd) per hex
- 100 die-cut unit counters plus 20 Random Number counters (to use in place of a six-sided die)
- Rulebook containing rules common to all four games in the Napoleon at War quadrigame
- Rulebook containing rules unique to Marengo

=== Gameplay ===
Marengo uses a simple "I Go, You Go" system of alternating turns where one player moves and fires, and then the other player moves and fires. When both have completed a turn, this represents one hour of game time. Zones of control are absolute — that is, once a unit moves adjacent to an enemy unit, it cannot move any further until one or the other of the units has been eliminated or forced to retreat. Additionally, during the first turn, French movement is halved, and French units cannot move into Austrian zones of control. In the last six turns of the game, the French can declare a "counterattack" during three of those turns, when French attack values are doubled.

== Publication history ==
In 1975, SPI released the quadrigame Napoleon at War, which subsequently appeared on SPI's Top Ten Bestseller List for six months after its publication. One of the games included was Marengo, designed by David Isby, with graphic design by Redmond A. Simonsen. Marengo was also released as a separate "folio game" packaged in a shrink-wrapped cardstock folio.

Following the demise of SPI, Hobby Japan acquired the rights to the game in 1986 and published a Japanese language edition as a pull-out game in Tactics Magazine.

Decision Games then acquired the rights to the game, and Chris Perello revised the rules. The result, retitled Marengo: Morning Defeat, Afternoon Victory, was published by Decision in 2010 using the painting "Marengo" by Louis-François Lejeune as cover art.

== Reception ==
In a 1976 poll conducted by SPI to determine the most popular wargames in North American, Marengo placed 44th out of 202 games, the lowest rating for any of the four games in the Napoleon at War quadrigame.

In the inaugural issue of the British wargaming magazine Phoenix, Jim Hind compared the four games in the Napoleon at War quadrigame for historical accuracy, and called Marengo "perhaps the weakest of the four." Hind also felt that the game's attempt to recreate the see-saw nature of the historical battle by preventing the French from attacking on their first turn but then increasing the French attack values later in the game "is indeed to produce a seesaw of a kind, but [...] it's still not enough."

In the 1977 book The Comprehensive Guide to Board Wargaming, Charles Vasey thought "the effect of the cavalry is rather artificially simulated."

In The Guide to Simulations/Games for Education and Training, Martin Campion noted that the "tactical system is not very realistic but tends to give realistic general results." As an education tool in the classroom, Campion thought that Marengo was simple and would make a good introductory game.

In Issue 53 of Moves, Ian Chadwick called Marengo "The fastest of the [four games] and quite enjoyable [...] it plays well and makes for a good, very quick game." He concluded by giving the game a grade of A for Playability but only C for Historical accuracy.

== Other reviews and commentary ==
- Fire & Movement #24
- The American Wargamer Vol.3 #8
- Simulacrum #20
