= King Arthur (board wargame) =

1979 medieval board wargame

Balaclava
- Designers: Robert Mosca & Linda Mosca
- Illustrators: Redmond A. Simonsen
- Publishers: Simulations Publications Inc.
- Publication: 1979
- Genres: Medieval

King Arthur, subtitled "The Battle of Stonehenge, 536", is a board wargame published by Simulations Publications, Inc. (SPI) in 1979 that was one of the games in the Great Medieval Battles "quadrigame" — a set of four thematically linked games that use the same set of rules. The game simulates the fictional Battle of Camlann between the forces of King Arthur and his son Mordred.

== Gameplay ==
King Arthur is a game representing King Arthur's final battle, where he leads the Knights of the Round Table, with additional mounted knights and archers, against Mordred's alliance of rebel knights, men-at-arms, archers, and slingers from throughout the British isles.

The first player uses the following sequence:

1. Rout Movement: Both players move counters that have been routed
2. Movement: The active player moves any or all units.
3. Ranged fire: Both players fire arrows or other ranged weapons
4. Active player melee
5. Other player melee

The second player then repeats this series of phases to complete one Game Turn, which represents 15 minutes of the battle.

King Arthur also has a number of exclusive rules to differentiate it from the other three games in the Great Medieval Battles box:

- Christian units suffer penalties in barrows, megaliths and altar hexes.
- Restrictions on cavalry charges through hedges, ditches, etc.
- Saxon soldiers have the ability to form a Shield Wall.
- Leaders can make Man-to-Man challenges.
- A leader may yield to an opposing leader.

=== Combat ===
Combat, which involves both ranged and melee weapons, does not result in direct elimination of units, but effects the morale of the defending unit, causing it to gain a level of Rout. Further morale effects are cumulative, and any unit that reaches four levels of Rout is eliminated.

=== Leaders ===
Leader counters play an important part of the game, both in their ability to remove Rout conditions from a unit, and in the Victory Conditions to win the game.

=== Victory conditions ===
Both players receive Victory Points (VPs) for killing or capturing enemy units and leaders. At the end of the game, Mordred's VPs are subtracted from King Arthur's VPs. If the result is greater than 20, King Arthur wins; 20 or less is a victory for Mordred.

== Publication history ==
In 1975 SPI published their first quadrigame, Blue and Gray. After the "four games in one box" concept proved to be popular, SPI quickly produced more quadrigames. One of these was 1979's Great Medieval Battles, which included King Arthur, designed by Rob Mosca and Linda Mosca, with graphic design by Redmond A. Simonsen.

Later the same year, SPI republished all four of the battles in the Great Medieval Battles box as separate stand-alone games.

== Reception ==
In Issue 29 of The Space Gamer, Keith Gross did not like the complex Combat Results Table, commenting, "The game can be fairly playable if the man-to-man combat matrix is replaced with a simple die roll." Gross concluded, "Overall, King Arthur is not a bad game, but it's not a great one either."

In Issue 98 of Campaign, Kevin Pollock commented "SPI has designed a nice game system to reflect conditions on the medieval battlefield while still holding on to the basic idea of the quad system - simplicity. The only problem I can see is that the game tends to be a bit slow due to the excessive number of die rolls."

In Issue 15 of The Grenadier, Ralph Vickers was not sure the rules truly reflected a simulation of medieval warfare, noting "On the whole one must conclude that medieval warfare in the hobby still has a way to go in its development." Vickers concluded "Before medieval games get into the ballpark of realism, game mechanics will have to be developed similar to supply in WW II type games."

In a retrospective review in Issue 85 of Fire & Movement, Peter Pariseau liked the game, calling it "one of the more interesting past efforts." Pariseau concluded, "The real key to the game is in the unusual combat system and its variable rout result."

== Other reviews and commentary ==
- Wargame News #13
