= Four Battles of Army Group South =

Collection of four board wargames published in 1979

- Designers: Kiev: Joseph Angiolillo; Korsun: Steve Patrick; Operation Star: Brent Noseworthy; Rostov: John H. Butterfield
- Illustrators: Redmond A. Simonsen
- Publishers: Simulations Publications Inc.
- Publication: 1979
- Genres: WWII

Four Battles of Army Group South is a collection of four board wargames published in 1979 by Simulations Publications Inc. (SPI) that simulate various battles between German and Soviet forces on the Eastern Front of World War II.

== Background ==
During Operation Barbarossa, Germany's surprise attack against the Soviet Union in the summer of 1941, German forces were divided into three groups. Army Group South was tasked with the capture of Ukraine and its capital city Kyiv. Army Group South and Soviet forces clashed repeatedly over the next three years.

== Description ==
Army Group South is a "quadrigame", four thematically connected games that use the same basic rules. The four games in the box are:

- Kiev: The Battle of Encirclement, 1941: The German offensive to conquer Ukraine (Designed by Joe Angiolillo)
- Rostov: The First Soviet Counter-Attack, 1941: As the Germans surge forward to take Rostov, they are met by a powerful Soviet counter-attack. (Designed by John Butterfield)
- Operation Star: The Soviet Winter Offensive, 1943: The Soviets try to re-take Kharkov and are met by a German counter-attack. (Designed by Brent Nosworthy)
- Korsun: The German Pocket on the Dniepr, 1944 : The Soviets attempt to encircle the Germans in the Korsun Pocket. (Designed by Stephen B. Patrick)

=== Components ===
The game box includes:

- four 22" x 17" paper hex grid maps, one for each game
- 800 double-sided die-cut counters (200 per game)
- Two copies of the 8-page rulebook: Rules common to all four games.
- Four 4-page rulebooks with rules unique to each game
- booklet of historical background

=== Gameplay ===
All four games use a common set of rules drawn from SPI's previously published wargame Panzergruppe Guderian. While that relatively simple system uses a traditional "I Go, You Go" system of alternating turns, it modifies the standard "move then attack" sequence by giving the German player an extra move for armored units after the attack sequence.

In addition, each of the four games has some additional rules that are unique to its situation.

== Publication history ==
In 1975, SPI published their first "quadrigame", Blue & Gray. The new game immediately rose to #1 on SPI's Top Ten Bestseller list the month it was released, and SPI subsequently released 16 quadrigames over the next five years. One of those was Army Group South, released in 1979 with graphic design by Redmond A. Simonsen. Although interest in quadrigames had waned, Army Group South garnered a fair amount of attention, and appeared on SPI's Top Ten Bestseller List for eight months.

Each of the games in Army Group South was also offered for individual sale.

After the demise of SPI, Hobby Japan published Japanese-language editions of two of the games in the Japanese wargaming magazine Tactics: Korsun in the June 1987 edition, and Operation Star in the February 1988 edition.

In 1998, Decision Games republished Army Group South in Issue 188 of Strategy & Tactics, but only included two of the games, Kiev and Rostov.

Sunset Games (サンセットゲ) acquired the game license in 2002 and published a Japanese language edition of Army Group South.

== Reception ==
In Issue 19 of Fire & Movement, Bill Sanders questioned the value of the game, writing "Army Group South is a classic case of a game being an hour late and a nickel short. It's late in that OSG's PanzerKrieg came about six months earlier and not only covers the battles ... presented in Army Group South, but ... has four other battles as well." Sanders also questioned the rules development process, commenting "SPI's quad of the Russo-German conflict in the Ukraine appears to have been done by some who were not fully sober in one stage of development or another."

In Campaign #95, Kevin Pollock liked the games, saying, "Overall, Army Group South offers a fine set of games using a proven system. The components, graphics, and rules are all excellent. Only the conditions for victory keep me from giving the effort an A+."

In Issue 23 of the British wargaming magazine Phoenix, Paul King liked the games but found them too small, writing, "What I would like to see is a bigger game using some of the better points of this quad." King examined each game in detail:

- Kiev: "A pleasant game, and a good introduction to the game system ... Perhaps the only criticism of Kiev is the map — everything is a shade of blue and concentrating on it for a long time is the best way to a headache."
- Operation Star: "This is not an idle game of 'pushing around counters,' the pieces of card you move have some meaning to them and care and attention must be given in any attack."
- Rostov: "The Victory Conditions should be taken with a pinch of salt and modified as required; any player should be satisfied with a draw in this one."
- Korsun: "The game does favour the Soviets slightly but such rules as delay, integrity and supply to pocketed units help the German a great deal."

King concluded, "This quad has certainly churned up some new ideas, let's hope they can be improved upon, the result would be well worth it."

Steve List wrote in Issue 50 of Moves that Army Group South "is a disappointment. The individual games are not in the least outstanding, and what merit they do have is detracted from by the lousy production job. The artwork is fine, but the rules stink; both general and exclusive rules have too many nontrivial errors to be acceptable." In looking at the individual games, List had the following comments:

- Korsun: "The German stands paralyzed while the Soviet puts him in the bag, but then the Soviet is obliged to give him a chance to wiggle out. Players who are not bothered by such restrictions will find this game solidly mediocre. Grade C+"
- Operation Star: "It is the best of the Quad (faint praise indeed), and essentially is one of maneuver in open terrain. Grade: B−"
- Rostov: "It would take a prodigious German performance to even reach Rostov, let alone hold it to the end of the game. Grade: C−"
- Kiev: "The general result is to allow the Germans to bag an enormous enemy force as they did historically. Grade: C"

List concluded, "All these games had great potential. None achieved it. Too bad."

In Issue 63 of Fire & Movement, Rick Swan was critical of the four-game collection, writing, "Army Group South is a not particularly successful example of an SPI quadrigame. [The four games are] a crazyquilt collection that is neither good history nor good gaming." Swan had issue with game balance, and thought the rules had not been well-developed, noting, "Stacking is the same for Rostov and Korsun, even though a Rostov hex represents an area twice as large as a Korsun hex, and Kiev doesn’t allow overruns or disruption, but no reasons are given." Swan concluded, "The Army Group South games work as acceptable solitaire exercises and provide tinkerers with reasonably solid basic systems – but let both the historian and competitive gamer beware."

In a retrospective review in Issue 20 of ′′Simulacrum′′, Peter Bartlett wrote, "AGS had the potential to be a rather good quad, but seems to have failed to live up to that potential."
