= Austerlitz (1972 board wargame) =

Board wargame

Cover of the "flatpack" edition

Austerlitz, subtitled "The Battle of Three Emperors, 2 December 1805", is a board wargame published by Simulations Publications Inc. (SPI) in 1972 that simulates the Battle of Austerlitz between Napoleon's French forces, and the Austro-Russian forces of the Third Coalition.

== Background ==
In 1805, an Allied force of Russians and Austrians was lured into a trap by Napoleon near the town of Austerlitz.

== Description ==
Austerlitz is a two-player wargame in which one player controls the Alliance army, and the other player controls the French army.

=== Components ===
The game includes:

- 22" x 28" paper hex grid map scaled at 400 m (440 yd) per hex
- 100 die-cut counters
- Map-folded rule sheet
- Two Terrain Effects charts
- A small six-sided die

=== Gameplay ===
Austerlitz uses a simple "I Go, You Go" alternating system of turns first used in SPI's Napoleon at Waterloo (1971). First the Allied player moves and then fires. Then the French player has the same opportunity. This completes one game turn, which represents one hour of game time.

== Publication history ==
Austerlitz was designed by John Michael Young, with graphic design by Redmond A. Simonsen and was published by SPI in 1972, first packaged in a plain white box with a red title ribbon, then later in a "flatpack" box with integrated counter tray.

== Reception ==
In a 1976 poll undertaken by SPI to determine the most popular board wargames in North America, Austerlitz placed a respectable 54th out of 202 games.

In his 1977 book The Comprehensive Guide to Board Wargaming, Nick Palmer called Austerlitz a "simple, well-balanced operational level game."

In the 1980 book The Complete Book of Wargames, game designer Jon Freeman commented that Austerlitz was "probably the best of the company's Napoleonic series of games and one of the most interesting around." He noted that "Play is quick and clean; there are enough units to minimize the effects of chance, but few enough to avoid the drudgery of piece-pushing." Freeman concluded by giving the game an Overall Evaluation of "Excellent", saying, "The game is usually in doubt until the end, offers a variety of outcomes, and presents innumerable opportunities for sharp tactical and strategic play."

In The Guide to Simulations/Games for Education and Training, Martin Campion questioned the balance of the game, saying, "With any kind of competent players, the French will always win. The question is, by how much?" He concluded, "The mechanics are not very reliable, but the action tends to follow the original battle."

== Other reviews and commentary ==
- Campaign #102 and #106
- Richard Berg's Review of Games #8
- Grenadier #13
- Panzerfaust #63
- Moves #53
