= Klondike (board game) =

1975 board game

Klondike is a board game released in 1975 by Gamma Two Games based on the gold rush in the Canadian Yukon.

== Gameplay ==
Players' tokens are moved along a track according to the roll of the dice. The spaces on the track on two adjacent sides of the board represent the fields where prospecting (panning for gold) is done. Players landing on a prospecting space turn over the top card of one of 4 stacks representing 4 different creeks, to reveal the value of gold uncovered, if any, or else follow the instructions printed on the card that follow the description of some supposed (often humorous) situation that has befallen the player in his/her quest for gold. The other two sides of the board represents a town where players can invest in (buy up) the various services (hotels, supply stores, casinos, saloons, etc.), along the lines of Monopoly, that will fleece the gold panners who subsequently land on these spaces. The winner is the player with the most cash on hand when the gold runs out (i.e. when all four card stacks are depleted). Any buildings and property on hand have no value at the end of the game as they are now considered to be part of a ghost town.

== Reviews ==
- The Playboy Winner's Guide to Board Games
