= Cemetery Hill (game) =

Board wargame published in 1975

Cover of folio edition, 1975

Cemetery Hill, subtitled "The Battle of Gettysburg, 1–3 July 1863", is a board wargame published by Simulations Publications, Inc. (SPI) in 1975 as part of the "quadrigame" Blue & Gray: Four American Civil War Battles that simulated four battles of the American Civil War. Cemetery Hill was later released as a stand-alone "folio" game.

== Description ==
Cemetery Hill is a division-level simulation of the Battle of Gettysburg, using simplified rules that had been developed for an earlier SPI game, Napoleon at Waterloo.

=== Components ===
Cemetery Hill, as part of the Blue and Gray boxed set, came with

- 17" x 22" three-color hex grid map scaled to 400 m (438 yd) per hex
- 100 die-cut counters
- rulebook of common rules for all four battles included in the set
- rule sheet with rules particular to Cemetery Hill

The folio edition of Cemetery Hill was packaged in a plastic bag and included a cardstock folder and one integrated rulebook.

=== Gameplay ===
With a small map and only 100 counters, the game is relatively simple. The game system uses an alternating "I Go, You Go" series of turns, where one player moves and attacks, followed by the other player. Each turn represents 1–2 hours of game time. A new concept, "Attack Effectiveness", was introduced for the Blue & Gray battles: If an attacking unit receives an "Attacker Retreat" result during combat, then that unit cannot make any further attacks for the rest of that game day, although it may defend as normal.

== Publication history ==
In 1975, SPI published Blue & Gray, its first quadrigame — four different battles using the same set of rules, packaged into one box. The four games were Shiloh: The Battle for Tennessee, 6–7 April 1862 ; Antietam: The Bloodiest Day, 17 September 1862 ; Chickamauga: The Last Victory, 20 September 1863; and Cemetery Hill. The latter was designed by Redmond A. Simonsen, Edward Curran, and Irad B. Hardy. The concept of the quadrigame proved popular, and pre-orders alone made Blue & Gray SPI's second-best selling game the month before it was published. Once released, it was SPI's top-selling game in July and August 1975.

The separate battles were also sold as individual games packaged in double LP-sized cardstock folios as the Blue & Gray Folio Series.

Given the popularity of Blue & Gray, SPI immediately produced a sequel containing four more battles, Blue & Gray II, which also proved to be popular.

== Reception ==
In his 1977 book The Comprehensive Guide to Board Wargaming, Nicholas Palmer was unimpressed, calling Cemetery Hill "a rather bland Gettysburg."

In Issue 23 of Moves, Mike Curran outlined possible strategy and tactics for Cemetery Hill, and suggested the Confederate player avoid the direct assaults that characterized the historical battle, such as Pickett's Charge, employing flanking measures instead. Curran suggested the Union player must immediately fall back to a stronger defensive line.

In Issue 54 of Moves, Steve List thought this was the weakest of the four games in Blue and Gray, saying "This game has many deficiencies." He disliked the new "Attack Effectiveness" rule, believing that "applying the [negative effect] to every failed attack is too lavish in its use, especially since no similar effect applies to defenders." He also pointed out that the map "bears little semblance to history." He concluded by giving the game a very poor grade of D minus.

In Issue 58 of Fire & Movement, Bill Koff called this game "simple, fast, and fun." He noted that although the scale used for all the games of the Blue & Gray collection, 400 m (440 yd) to the hex, worked well for the other three Civil War battles, "Unfortunately, Cemetery Hill is the least successful [...] to use this system. This stems from a failure to squeeze the battle into that format. Union units are division-sized, whereas most of the other Blue & Gray titles use [smaller-sized] brigades. [...] It just doesn't fit."

== Other reviews ==
- The Wargamer Vol. 1, #3 and Vol. 1, #32
- Simulacrum #20
- Pursue & Destroy Vol. 1, #3
