= Strike Force One =

1975 Cold War-themed board wargame

Cover of Victory Point Games' second edition, published in 2007

Strike Force One, subtitled "The Cold War Heats Up — 1975", is a board wargame published by Simulations Publications Inc. (SPI) during the Cold War in 1975 that simulates a hypothetical clash in West Germany between Soviet Union invaders, and American defenders. The short and simple game was designed as an introduction to the hobby of wargaming, and was given away as a free promotional item.

== Description ==
Strike Force One is a two-player board wargame where one player controls Soviet invasion forces and the other player controls the American defenders.

=== Setting ===
The small hex grid map, only 8 hexes by 9 hexes, is set in a rural section of West Germany. The only terrain on the map are three town hexes and five impassable forest hexes. The setup positions of the counters are marked on the map.

=== Gameplay ===
With only 10 counters (6 Soviet, 4 American), and a basic "I Go, You Go" alternating system of turns where one player moves and attacks followed by the other player, Strike Force One has been characterized as "a very basic game" that only requires 5–10 minutes to play.

All units have the same movement and attack/defense strength. Units cannot move from one hex of an enemy unit's zone of control to another hex of the same zone of control, but can leave the zone of control without penalty. Combat is not mandatory for units adjacent to one another. Combat results in either retreat or elimination for the loser.

=== Advanced rules ===
Advanced rules allow for stacking of units, for movement through the forested hexes with a penalty, the addition of a West German counter, and the addition of an "Exchange" result to the Combat Results Table, where both sides lose a counter.

=== Victory conditions ===
The game lasts for four turns. The Soviets must occupy two of the three towns by the end of the game to win. The Americans win by preventing this.

== Publication history ==
In 1971, Jim Dunnigan, co-founder of SPI, designed Napoleon at Waterloo, a small and simple Napoleonic wargame that was given free to new subscribers of SPI's house magazine Strategy & Tactics. But as critic John Kula noted, "According to SPI, testing showed that the two concepts that were the most difficult for newcomers to grasp were sequence of play, and zones of control." Accordingly, Dunnigan and Redmond A. Simonsen designed Strike Force One, a new promotional game. The small game, packaged in an envelope, replaced Napoleon at Waterloo as the free game given to new Strategy & Tactics subscribers, and was also given away at conventions. A copy of the game was included in Nicky Palmer's 1977 book The Comprehensive Guide to Board Wargaming.

In 2007, Victory Point Games published a second edition of the game.

== Reception ==
In the 1980 book The Complete Book of Wargames, game designer Jon Freeman rated the presentation of the game and the clarity of the rules as Very Good, and the playability as Excellent. Nonetheless, Freeman didn't like the game, commenting "it's flawed as an introduction, and it can hardly be considered a wargame. It's too simple to by anything but a short die-rolling contest; there's no opportunity for skillful play." Freeman didn't think anyone would play this game more than once, and concluded by giving the game an Overall Evaluation of "Marginal, for utter novices; for anyone else, forget it."

In The Guide to Simulations/Games for Education and Training, Martin Campion recommended the game as a classroom tool for high school and college students, noting "The main point of the game is that it introduces some of the most common mechanics of wargames to the novice player." Campion also commented that despite "the small number of pieces on the board, the game offers several choices of strategy."

In a retrospective review in Issue 19 of Simulacrum, John Kula noted "Strike Force One is perhaps too simple a game, and has little replay value once it has been mastered. On the other hand, SPI never claimed it to be anything more than an introduction for non-wargamers, and as such, it worked admirably."
