= Starship: The Game of Space Contact =

Starship: The Game of Space Contact is a 1975 board wargame published by Fantasy Games.

== Gameplay ==
Starship is two-player game, with one playing as the Interceptor and one as the Intruder, in which each player commands one starship with four different scenarios where each player keeps their goal secret from the opponent, ranging from peaceful contact to total destruction.

== Reception ==
Tony Watson reviewed Starship in The Space Gamer No. 8. He commented that "Starship" is fast paced and plays well. The emphasis is on skill and bluff, outmanuver and good planning rather than luck and certainly one of the better science fiction tactical systems around."
