= Tank Battle =

Board game

- Players: 2
- Setup time: < 5-10 minutes
- Playing time: < 15-20 minutes
- Age range: 8 to Adult

Tank Battle is a Milton Bradley board game of strategy where players attempt to out-guess and out-maneuver their opponent in a contest of armored warfare, and includes the extra strategy brought by fuel and ammunition dumps as well as anti-tank guns and mines. On the box lid was a picture of tanks resembling Shermans and Panzers and in some releases the playing pieces resembled these models. In other releases there were only Panzers which were green or beige.

Milton Bradley touted this game as "The game of planning and strategy".

== Game play ==
The players take turns moving tanks across a 10x10 grid of 100 numbered rectangles, while attempting to take out the ammunition dump, the fuel depot, the headquarters, the anti-tank guns and the tanks of the opposing player. The player that destroys all the opponent's tanks without losing all of theirs wins.
