= Linda Mosca =

Board wargame designer

Linda D. Mosca was the first commercially published female board wargame designer. In the mid-1970s, when the wargame industry was dominated by men, she was the only woman employed in a creative role.

== Career ==
During the summer of 1975, Jack Greene, a game designer with the small company Simulations Design Corporation, visited the three largest American wargame manufacturers, Games Designers Workshop, Avalon Hill, and Simulations Publications Inc. (SPI). He was interested in getting their opinions on the current state of board wargaming, which he published in Issue 71 of Campaign. During his visits, the only woman he was able to talk to who was employed in a creative role at any of the three companies was Linda Mosca, who was designing her first wargame for SPI at the time of his visit. During her interview, Mosca championed the fantasy role-playing game Dungeons & Dragons published by TSR, noting that it could be a gateway for more women to play tabletop games.

The previous year, Linda Mosca had been on the production staff of SPI's house magazine Strategy & Tactics. A year later, at a time when the industry was dominated by men, Mosca was commissioned by SPI to design a game. Her first game, the one being designed during Greene's visit, was Battle of the Wilderness: Gaining the Initiative. It was subsequently published by SPI in 1975 as one of four wargames packaged together in the "quadrigame" Blue & Gray II. The tactical game, which simulates the Battle of the Wilderness during the American Civil War, made Mosca the wargame industry's first professional female board wargame designer.

By the time she was interviewed by Greene, Mosca had already published an article titled "Women in Wargaming" in the February–March 1975 issue of Moves in which she concluded "I would like to remind women wargamers that while they are fewer in numbers, they make equally effective generals. That war is a man's domain is disproven by the fact that its wellsprings are societal and outcome affects all, regardless of gender. That history belongs to men is disproven by the few accounts of great women that filtered down, even as recorded by male historians. Remember, of the three persons most feared by Rome, two were women (Cleopatra & Zenobia)."

After the publication of Battle of the Wilderness, Mosca designed Thirty Years War: Rocroi (1975), and co-designed two other games: Gondor: The Siege of Minas Tirith (1976) with Richard Berg; and King Arthur (1979) with Richard Mosca. She was also on the production teams for Strike Force One (1975), Chinese Farm (1975), War in the West (1976), Terrible Swift Sword (1976), and Russian Civil War 1918-1922 (1976).

== Critical reception of her designs ==
=== Battle of the Wilderness ===
In the April 1976 edition of Airfix Magazine, Bruce Quarrie called this game "Good exciting stuff, challenging for experienced players but basic enough to make a good starting point for anyone interested in the Civil War and wishing to try board wargaming."

In Issue 20 of Simulacrum, Steven Busey commented "This is certainly not a simulation. However, it is a very playable game system that often demands careful thought during play. The combination of easy-to-learn rules and short games makes this an excellent alternative when time and attention are short."

In the book Feminist War Games?, Anastasia Salter examined the role of women in the wargame industry from a feminist perspective, and noted that with the publication of this game, Mosca became the first published female wargame designer. "The game is certainly not recognizable as a feminist work, as its mechanics are traditional, but its existence itself is significant."

=== Rocroi ===
In his 1977 book The Comprehensive Guide to Board Wargaming, Nick Palmer noted that Rocroi was "possibly the only wargame to date designed by a woman." He thought that "the markedly different movement and combat strengths of the units on each side give each side interesting tactical problems."

In The Guide to Simulations/Games for Education and Training, history professor Martin Campion surveyed the hundreds of board wargames that had been produced in the 1960s and 70s, and drew up a list of The Twenty Best Military History Simulations. Campion included Rocroi in that list.

In Issue 25 of the UK wargaming magazine Phoenix, Chris Bramall was impressed by the strategic thinking necessary, and wrote "it is my belief that Rocroi is the best game of the four [in the Thirty Years War quadrigame]. Admittedly it lacks balance but only if the French player is skilful. Indeed an experienced Spaniard will always beat the tyro Frenchman."

Writing for Battlefield, Howard Anderson also thought this was "the gem of the Thirty Years War Quad." He called the game "as much a contest of will as a battle. The Spanish have no need to attack in the game or in history. The French must come to them." He concluded, "The battle will hinge on the first to falter along the line."
