= Ancient Conquest =

Board wargame

Excalibre Games edition, 1975

Ancient Conquest is a board wargame published by Excalibre Games in 1975 that simulates the clash of empires during the Bronze Age.

== Description ==
Ancient Conquest is a four-player game that includes a mounted hex grid map of the Fertile Crescent, 200 counters, and a rulebook. Each player controls one of four groups of tribes, nations, and peoples:

1. Blue: Egypt, Media, Urartu, and the Arameans
2. Red: Assyria, the Marsh People, Mitanni, and Lydia
3. Yellow: The Elamites, Hittites, Cimmerians, and Judah/Israel
4. Green: The Kassites, Chaldeans, City States, Phrygians, and Philistines

Play is always in the above order. During the game, the David counter and the Goliath counter must fight to the death, and the Egypt player must decide whether he will allow the Chosen People counter to depart, in a reference to the Exodus.

The game is 15 turns, which represents about 900 years. Players amass victory points by accomplishing various tasks assigned to the factions within their empire.

== Publication history ==
In 1975, R. J. Hlavnicka and Dennis P. O'Leary designed Ancient Conquest, which was published by Excalibre Games. In the 21st century, Decision Games acquired the rights to the game and published a second edition in 2012.

== Reception ==
In Issue 6 of Strategic Review, Dennis O'Leary noted the game was designed for "gamers who enjoy mastering the strategy and tactical mechanics of wargames in general." He warned that players must keep track of their objective chart rather than seeking a military solution. "Like chess if you can think ahead and base your strategic moves on the objective charts (assuming you are competent at rules mechanics) you will do well."

In the 1980 book The Complete Book of Wargames, game designer Jon Freeman called this "a game that is hard to pin down. It's essentially a multiplayer game without all that much player interaction." He noted that the game "relies heavily on 'chrome' — unusual rules and phrases — to lift the game from its basically simplistic and unassuming level." He concluded by giving the game an Overall Evaluation of "Good", saying, "Ancient Conquest is an unusual game for people seeking an item a bit out of the ordinary."

In The Guide to Simulations/Games for Education and Training, Martin Campion thought this game was "somewhat overpriced but it is on a unique subject." He found that "the objectives of each people in the game seem to be rather arbitrary but they keep the action directed along roughly historical channels." He concluded with a warning that "The first playing of the game is more than ordinarily confusing for a beginning player because of the lack of any logical connection between [the player's] different peoples."

== Other reviews and commentary ==
- Panzerfaust & Campaign #71 & #73
- Perfidious Albion #71
