= Pay Day (board game) =

1974 board game

- Box cover and game layout, Winning Moves 30th Anniversary edition
- Designers: Paul J. Gruen
- Publishers: Parker Brothers; Winning Moves Games USA
- Players: 2 to 4
- Setup time: 5 minutes
- Playing time: 45-60 minutes
- Chance: High
- Age range: 8 and up
- Skills: Roll-and-Move; Money Management

Pay Day is a board game originally made by Parker Brothers (now a subsidiary of Hasbro) in 1974. It was invented by Paul J. Gruen of West Newbury, Massachusetts, United States, one of the era's top board game designers, and his brother-in-law Charles C. Bailey. It was Gruen's most successful game, outselling Monopoly in its first production year. Pay Day is currently marketed by Winning Moves Games USA.

The game simulates money management, with the game board resembling a calendar month. Before the game, the players decide how many months to be played (i.e. how many times to travel across the board). During the game, players accumulate bills and expenses to pay, along with collecting their monthly wage on "pay day" at the end of the month. The winner is the player who has the most money at the end of the last month of play.

== Rules (original 1974-era) ==
=== Object ===
The object is to be the player who has the most cash and savings at the end of the game. Players decide in advance how many in-game months will be played.

=== Equipment ===
The game consisted of the game board, one die, four playing pieces, play money, 16 "Deal" cards, and 72 "Mail" cards.

Older versions also included a "Savings and Loan Calculator" and 12 "savings and loans" pegs; later editions replaced the "calculator" and pegs with a "Savings and Loan" pad plus a table to calculate savings and loan interest.

=== Play ===
Each player starts with $325. One player is selected to go first. Players roll the die and advance their playing piece from 1 to 6 spaces as indicated on the die. The player follows the instructions shown on the calendar space on the game board. There are 31 days in a Pay Day month.

=== Deal and mail cards ===
If a player lands on either a "Deal" or "Mail" space, they will then select the appropriate card(s) from the top of the specified deck.

==== Deal cards ====
The player has the option of purchasing the "Deal" for the cost indicated immediately or returning the card to the bottom of the deck. (One may take out a loan to pay for the deal.) The "Deal" is held until that player lands on a "Buyer" space at any time during the duration of the game. A "Deal" card has no value if it remains unsold at the end of the game. Whenever a "Deal" is purchased, all players have an opportunity to win the "Commission" indicated on the "Deal" card. Each player in turn rolls the die, with the highest roller collecting the "Commission" from the bank.

==== Mail cards ====
Mail cards have varying content, just like real mail. Some mail cards are bills, some are fortuitous collections, and some are just entertaining (postcards and advertisements).

Bills are due at the end of the month (unless cancelled by Insurance, see below), while collections (except for Lottery Tickets) are payable immediately. Postcards and junk mail are immediately discarded.

Three types of mail cards are "special" mail cards which have unique rules:

Lottery Ticket
If a player gets a lottery ticket in the mail, that player can cash in the value of the ticket only if that player lands on the Lottery Draw space during the month they receive it in the mail. After the end of the month, if it is not redeemed, it becomes void and must be returned to the bottom of the Mail pile.

Swellfare
If a player's loan, plus loan interest due, plus bills are greater than their total amount of cash, they are in debt. That player may bet up to $100, then if that player rolls a 5 or a 6, they collect 10 times the amount bet; otherwise, the amount bet goes into the pot. Swellfare cards not used are immediately discarded.

Insurance
If a player receives a mailing for either auto insurance ("Carr Insurance Co.") or health insurance ("Aches & Pains Insurance Co."), the player may purchase insurance at their option. If purchased, the insurance is good for the entire game and will automatically cancel any related bills (including those already held by the player). Insurance cards not used are immediately discarded.

=== Daylight savings ===
Each player in turn, starting with the player who landed there, moves their token back one space and follows the instructions as in a regular turn. If a player's game piece is on the "Start" space when another player lands on "Daylight Savings", they simply collect another $325 and leave the game piece on "Start." The "Daylight Savings" process takes place only once on any turn and should not be repeated if a player lands there as a result of another player having landed there first.

=== Town election ===
All players must contribute to the town election ($50 per person). If a player does not have the cash, they must withdraw from their savings, or take out or increase a loan. The next player to roll a 6 during the course of the game wins the Pot (including any "Swellfare" money that may already be in there).

=== Poker game ===
Each player has the option of placing $100 on the board. All poker game participants roll the die. The highest roller collects all of the money.

=== Buyer ===
If a player holding a Deal card lands on a Buyer space, they may return it to the bottom of the Deal deck and collect the indicated sale price from the bank. Only one Deal card may be redeemed per turn.

=== Savings and loans ===
A player may have either a savings account or a loan, but never both at the same time.

Savings
Players may start or add to their savings only on Pay Day. Players may withdraw all or part of their savings only on Pay Day (if the player wishes to withdraw at another time, they must pay a $50 fee). A player receives 10% interest on the balance in his/her savings account every time he lands on Pay Day. For easy calculation of interest on savings or loans refer to the Interest Table.

Loans
A loan may be taken out or increased at any time in $100 increments. A player must pay 20% interest on his/her outstanding loan balance every time they land on Pay Day. Loans may only be paid off on Pay Day.

Calculating savings and loans
The original editions included a "Savings and Loan Calculator" peg board and 12 "savings and loans" pegs. When a player opened an account, a peg was then added in the appropriate S or L section of the player’s calculator to show the amount of money which was held or lent by the bank. This system was later replaced with a "Savings and Loan" pad to actually hand write the amounts in the savings and loan accounts, plus there was a printed table to help calculate savings and loan interest.

=== Sweet Sunday ===
As the name indicates, Sweet Sunday spaces have neither an award nor a penalty, just a space to "rest".

=== Pay Day ===
A player who reaches this space immediately stops, regardless of any additional counts on the die, and goes through these steps in the indicated order.

1. Collect monthly wages of $325, except on the last month of play.
2. Collect 10% interest on any savings account, or pay 20% interest on any outstanding loan balance to the bank.
3. Pay all bills received during the month and place them in the discarded mail stack. If a player does not have enough cash to pay the bills, they must either withdraw money from their savings account, or take out or increase a loan.
4. OPTIONAL: Pay off part or all of an outstanding loan, withdraw money from a savings account without penalty, or deposit money into the account. These transactions may only be done in $100 increments.
5. Discard any unused Lottery Tickets.
6. Discard any Deal cards still held (last month of play only).
7. Move the game piece back to the Start space, unless the player has just completed their last month of play.

=== Winning ===
The player who finishes the game with the most money (cash plus savings or cash minus loans) after all players clearing the set number of months before the play starts is the winner. If all players are "in the negative" (all have loans exceeding their cash), then whoever is the least "in the negative" wins.

== Changes to the 1994 edition ==
Some of the changes/additions to the 1994 edition included:

- The maximum number of players was increased to six, as well as the number of players' tokens.
- The game now had 24 "Deal" cards and 48 "Mail" cards
- Savings accounts were removed from the game. Players can only open loans.
- Players began the game with $3,500 and received this amount at the end of each month. Loan increments were also increased from $100 to $1,000. The other dollar amounts were also multiplied by 10.
  - However, the loan interest per month was decreased from 20 percent to 10 percent.
- The "Pot" was renamed to "Jackpot".
- The lottery ticket mail card and the lottery draw was replaced with new lottery rules: Once a player lands on the Lottery space, a lottery begins. The Bank first antes up $1,000, then each player may optionally ante an additional $100 to the pot. Then starting with the player who landed on the space, each player who anted in turn picks a different number from 1 to 6. The player who landed on the Lottery space rolls the die, and the player whose number is rolled collects all the money.
- Additional special board spaces:
  - Super Ski Sunday, Charity Concert, Food for the Month, and Shopping Spree: the player must put the amount shown into the Jackpot.
  - Sweepstakes: the player who lands on this space receives $5000 from the bank.
  - Radio phone-in contest: each player, starting with the one who lands on this space, rolls the die, and the first one to roll a 3 receives $1,000 from the bank.
  - Happy Birthday: the player who lands on this space gets $100 each from every other player.
  - Yard Sale: at the start of a game, a "Deal" card is placed face down under the edge of the board next to this space, indicating the deal being sold at the yard sale. The player who lands on this space then pays the bank $100 times the number rolled and takes the Deal card under the edge of the board. A new deal card is then placed face down to indicate the deal at the next yard sale.
  - Walk For Charity: All players, except the player who landed on this space, roll the die and put $100 times the number rolled into the Jackpot.
- Special mail cards:
  - Pay a Neighbor: the player chooses an opponent to pay the amount shown on the card. Even if predetermined month of the player is retired.
  - Mad Money: the player chooses an opponent to collect from the amount shown on the card.
  - Charity: the player must put the amount of money shown on the card into the Jackpot.

== Reviews ==
- Games and Puzzles
