= 1975 in games =

This page lists board and card games, wargames, miniatures games, and tabletop role-playing games published in 1975. For video games, see 1975 in video gaming.

== Games released or invented in 1975 ==
- Ancient Conquest
- Battle of the Five Armies
- Boot Hill (tabletop role-playing game)
- Cemetery Hill: The Battle of Gettysburg, 1–3 July 1863
- Chinese Farm
- Dungeon!
- En Garde! (tabletop role-playing game)
- Golan
- Headache
- Klondike
- Midway
- Pay Day
- Search & Destroy: Tactical Combat Vietnam 1965-1966
- The Siege of Minas Tirith
- Sorcerer
- SSN
- Star Probe
- Starship: The Game of Space Contact
- Stellar Conquest
- Tank Battle
- Tunnels & Trolls (tabletop role-playing game)
- White Bear and Red Moon
- The Ythri

== Significant game-related events in 1975 ==
- Chaosium Inc. was founded by Greg Stafford.
- Fantasy Games Unlimited was founded by Scott Bizar.
- Games Workshop was founded by Ian Livingstone and Steve Jackson.
- Metagaming Concepts was founded by Howard Thompson.

== Deaths ==
Date	Name	Age	Notability
January 31	Don Kaye	36	co-founder of TSR

== See also ==
- 1975 in video gaming
