= La Grande Armée (wargame) =

Board wargame published in 1972

The Campaigns of Napoleon in Central Europe
- Cover: "Napoleon and his Staff"; Jean-Louis Ernest Meissonier c 1868
- Designers: John Michael Young
- Illustrators: Redmond A. Simonsen
- Publishers: Simulations Publications Inc.
- Publication: 1972
- Genres: Napoleonic wargame
- Players: 2

La Grande Armée, subtitled "The Campaigns of Napoleon in Central Europe", is a board wargame published by Simulations Publications Inc. (SPI) in 1972 that simulates three campaigns of Napoleon.

== Description ==
La Grande Armée is a two-player game at the operational level in which one player plays Napoleon, while the other player controls his various enemies, depending on the campaign chosen.

=== Components ===
The game includes:

- 23" x 29" paper hex grid map scaled at 15 km (10 mi) per hex
- 400 die-cut counters
- 10-page rules booklet
- scenarios booklet
- player charts and aids
- small six-sided die

=== Gameplay ===
The rules are based on those of SPI's previously published wargame Leipzig (1969), and use a traditional "I Go, You Go" alternating system, where one player completes movement, combat and supply, and then the other player does the same. This completes one turn, which represents 10 days of game time.

Forced marches and triple-forced marches can be done, at a cost of unit disruptions and loss of strength from stragglers. Smaller units can move faster than larger units, but there is a cost to break up a large unit, and another cost to rebuild smaller units into a large unit.

Leadership and supply are very important to the game.

=== Scenarios ===
There are three scenarios included with the game:

- 1805: France versus Austria and Russia (and possibly Prussia, if France accidentally activates them)
- 1806: France versus Prussia and Russia
- 1809: France versus Austria

=== Victory conditions ===
Only the French player earns victory points by capturing or besieging enemy fortresses, and must earn a certain number of points in order to claim victory. If this level is not achieved, Napoleon's opponents are the winners. To force the French to continually advance and attack, at certain points of each scenario, if the French victory point total is below a certain level, the other player receives special reinforcements.

== Publication history ==
La Grande Armée was designed by John Michael Young, with graphic design by Redmond A. Simonsen, and was published in 1972 in a plain white box with a red title ribbon. A "flatpack box" edition with traditional cover art was also released in 1972.

The game sold well for SPI, and in a 1976 poll conducted by SPI to determine the most popular wargames in North America, La Grande Armée was the most popular Napoleonic operational game in the poll, placing 54th out of 202 games.

== Reception ==
In the 1977 book The Comprehensive Guide to Board Wargaming, Nicholas Palmer commented on the "rather bare map", but complimented the "four hundred varied counters from different nations featuring in well-designed scenarios from 1805 to 1809." Palmer ascribed the game's success and popularity to "a simple basic system giving the special problems of war in this period: depots and supply; cavalry screening; fortresses; forced marches; [and] individual tactical abilities of leaders."

In Issue 11 of Moves (October/November 1973), Martin Campion thought the "three scenarios are very well put together, with some of the political factors included by such provisions as a possible Prussian intervention in the 1805 campaign." He liked the many different counters, pointing out, "In Leipzig the opposing armies are identical in all but numbers and leaders. But in La Grande Armee the differences between the Napoleonic army, the Frederician Prussian army, the ancien regime Austrian army of 1805, the new modeled Austrian army of 1809, and the cumbrous but tough Russian army are all reflected in different counter values and systems of building up as well as in differences in numbers and leaders. It makes for a much more interesting game." Campion concluded, "In all of the scenarios, the French have the edge, of course, but they also have the burden of the offensive."

In Issue 52 of Moves (August/September 1980), Ian Chadwick thought the map was "old and drab by today's standards" but he found that "The game is always fluid and interesting." He warned that "this is a relatively easy game to learn, but a more difficult one to master." Chadwick concluded by giving this game grades of "B+" for playability, "B" for historical accuracy, and "B−" for component quality, saying, "This game should be in every Napoleonic buff's collection. It may lack in graphics, but it offers insight into the tactics and strategy of Napoleonic campaign and maneuver. Still highly playable after all these years."

In The Guide to Simulations/Games for Education and Training, Martin Campion thought the game "shows a lot about the marching and concentration for battle of Napoleon's army, about the differences between his army and those of his opponents in these years, and about the superiority of French leadership." Campion wasn't sure this game would be a useful teaching aid, saying, "It is too complicated and abstract in its mechanics for most uses. I have used the 1806 scenario with some simplification of the rules, and with the players at both sides sitting at separate boards where they could not see their opponents' dispositions or actions [...] The result was very realistic regarding the conditions of warfare at the time, although the French group in my class did not include any Napoleons, and so they lost rather badly."

In the 1980 book The Complete Book of Wargames, game designer Jon Freeman commented "If there were such a thing as an SPI classic, this would be one. It's nearly ten years old but is still one of the most playable and — in terms of design intent — most accurate of Napoleonic games." Freeman noted that "The system places a premium on the Napoleonic ideal of dispersal for movement and concentration for battle.". Freeman concluded by giving this game an Overall Evaluation of "Very Good", saying, "Despite its stark appearance, it's a top item."

== Other reviews and commentary ==
- Fire & Movement #24
- Outposts #7
- Battle Flag Vol.1 #28
- Phoenix #7
- Perfidious Albion #71 (p18-19)
