= Blue & Gray II =

Board wargame published by Simulation Publications, Inc

Blue & Gray II, subtitled "Four American Civil War Battles", is a collection of four board wargames originally published by Simulations Publications, Inc. (SPI) in 1975 that each simulate a battle from the American Civil War. It is the sequel to Blue & Gray published earlier in the year. Each of the four games was also published as individual "folio games."

== Description ==
Blue & Gray II is a quadrigame, a single box with four different games that use the same rules. The four games included are:

- Fredericksburg: The Union Repulsed, designed by Joe Angiolillo
- Hooker and Lee: The Battle of Chancellorsville, designed by Richard Berg
- Chattanooga: Gateway to Victory, designed by Frederick Georgian
- Battle of the Wilderness: Gaining the Initiative, designed by Linda Mosca

In addition to the common set of rules, each separate game has a few exclusive rules. Compared to "monster" wargames of the time that had more than 1000 counters and lasted for several days, each of these battles uses 100 or fewer counters and can be completed in a few hours.

== Gameplay ==
For their 1971 wargame Napoleon at Waterloo, SPI developed a simple alternating "I Go, You Go" system of turns where one player moves and then fires, followed by the other player. Blue & Gray II and subsequent SPI quadrigames use this system. Two of the games, Fredericksburg and Hooker and Lee, can be combined into one campaign game.

== Publication history ==
In 1975, SPI published their first "quadrigame", Blue & Gray. The new game immediately rose to #1 on SPI's Top Ten Bestseller list the month it was released, and SPI immediately released another quadrigame of Civil War battles titled Blue & Gray II. It also proved popular, rising to #6 on SPI's Bestseller list and staying on the list for six months. Several more Blue & Gray battles were also published in SPI's house magazine Strategy & Tactics.

Each of the individual games was also published as a "folio game", a game packaged in a cardstock folio.

== Reception ==
In Issue 3 of Perfidious Albion, Charles Vasey commented, "This [quadrigame] is fairly accurate, and presents an interesting range of games ... The historical research is quite impressive and probably explains this game's accuracy over the lamentable Napoleonic Quad." Vasey concluded, "I found it a very enjoyable and simple set of games and would recommend it to everyone."

In the April 1976 edition of Airfix Magazine, Bruce Quarrie called this "Good, exciting stuff, challenging for experienced players but basic enough to make a good starting point for anyone interested in the Civil War and wishing to try board wargaming."

In Issue 12 of Jagdpanther, Daniel Palter suggested the "Fredericksburg" game could be improved by adding five counters representing XI Corps, which historically had been held in reserve on the day of the battle.

In a 1976 poll of wargamers conducted by SPI to determine the most popular wargame in America, Blue & Gray II placed 54th out of 202 wargames.

In his 1977 book The Comprehensive Guide to Board Wargaming, Nicholas Palmer called this sequel "Not quite such a hit [as Blue & Gray] but still favoured." Looking at the individual games, Palmer thought Hooker and Lee "Short (nine turns), but with interesting dilemmas for both sides"; Fredericksburg was "One of the less popular games in the Blue & Gray Quads"; and Battle of the Wilderness was "limited to the roads and tracks of the wooded areas."

In the 1980 book The Complete Book of Wargames, game designer Jon Freeman noted that only Battle of the Wilderness allowed for fluid movement, and two of the games are relatively simple assaults on prepared positions. He concluded "As a whole, this is a handy but not essential group, and it's not as attractive as Napoleon at War.

In Issue 54 of Moves, Steve List made it clear that he was not a fan of quadrigames, writing "They are games, not pretending to be simulations, and some of their inaccuracies and design compromises annoy me." He rated "Fredericksburg" a "C", noting "A major flaw is the placement of key terrain near the board edge ... forcing a frontal assault on a one-hex front to take it." List gave both "Hooker & Lee" and "Chattanooga" a "C" as well, but rated "Battle of the Wilderness" only a D-, complaining that the Union forces are given handicaps to enter forest while the Confederates "are given superhuman mobility ... The conflict becomes one of almost surgical strikes by a mobile defender against a ponderous attack, rather than an inchoate brawl that eventually died out due to mutual exhaustion."

In a retrospective review in Issue 20 of Simulacrum, Steve Bucey noted, "This is certainly not a simulation. However, it is a very playable game system that often demands careful thought during play. The combination of easy-to-learn rules and short scenarios makes this an excellent alternative when time and attention are short."

== Other reviews and commentary ==
- Strategy & Tactics #54
- Fire & Movement #83
- Campaign #102
- Ann Arbor Wargamer #10
