= Napoleon at Waterloo (board wargame) =

Board wargame

Cover art of "flatpack" boxed edition

Napoleon at Waterloo is a board wargame published by Simulations Publications, Inc. (SPI) in 1971 that simulates the Battle of Waterloo. The game, which features simple rules, was designed as an introduction to board wargaming, and was given as a gift with each subscription to SPI's Strategy & Tactics magazine.

== Description ==
Napoleon at Waterloo is a two-player grand tactical board wargame in which one player takes the role of Napoleon controlling the French forces, and the other player takes the role of the Duke of Wellington controlling the Anglo-Allied forces. The game comes with a single scenario based on the historical battle.

=== Components ===
The free game sent to new subscribers of Strategy & Tactics consisted of:

- 17" x 23" paper hex grid map
- 80 die-cut counters
- map-folded rulesheet
- SPI Letter of Introduction and Examples of Play

For sale in stores, SPI packaged the game in a "flatpack" box with cover art and an integral tray.

=== Gameplay ===
The game uses a simple "I Go, You Go" system of alternating player turns:

- The French player moves all units desired, and engages in combat.
- The second player then has the same opportunity.

This completes one game turn, which represents 1 hour of game time. In addition:

- Stacking of units is prohibited.
- There are no supply rules.
- Zones of control are both "rigid" and "sticky": a unit moving adjacent to an enemy unit must stop there. Combat is mandatory, and units thus engaged cannot move away from each other except as a result of combat.

=== Victory conditions ===
The French win by demoralizing their enemies and moving at least 7 units off the north side of the map. The Allies win by inflicting 40 points of damage on the French without taking 40 points of damage themselves.

== Publication history ==
In 1969, game designer Jim Dunnigan formed Poultron Press to take over the failing wargaming magazine Strategy & Tactics. The small company also released a series of cheaply made "test" board wargames to see if there was a market for them. The results were promising, and Dunnigan changed the name of the company to Simulations Publications Inc. (SPI) and began to market professionally printed games. One of the first, designed by Dunnigan and published in 1971, was Napoleon at Waterloo, a small and simple game with a two-tone brown and tan map designed by Redmond A. Simonsen. It was meant to introduce new players to the wargame hobby. In addition to being sold in stores, a free copy of Napoleon at Waterloo was mailed to new subscribers of Strategy & Tactics. In addition, non-subscribers could get a free copy of the game simply by writing to SPI.

The game proved popular, and SPI immediately released the Napoleon at Waterloo Advanced Game Expansion Kit, which included an expanded set of counters, extra rules and more scenarios.

The game was popular because of its simple game mechanics, and these were subsequently used in many smaller SPI games including The Battle of Borodino (1972), Austerlitz (1973), Blue & Gray (1975), Napoleon at War (1975), Blue and Gray II (1975), Sixth Fleet (1975), Battle for Germany (1975), Napoleon's Last Battles (1976), and Road to Richmond (1977).

In 1979, SPI re-released Napoleon at Waterloo, now subtitled ""SPI Introduction to Wargaming", with an updated four-color map. The game also included the expanded rules set, counters and scenarios from the Advanced Game Expansion Kit.

After the demise of SPI, Hobby Japan obtained the rights to the game and published a Japanese language edition in 1985. In the 21st century, Decision Games acquired the rights and published a revised second edition in 2014.

== Reception ==
In Issue 2 of the UK magazine Games & Puzzles, (July 1972), game designer Don Turnbull called it "A fine introductory game [...] Perhaps the best game for beginners — and cheap too!" Several issues later, Turnbull added, "this is perhaps the best 'simple' game of all, with 'clean' play mechanics, a small number of units, straightforward rules and interesting play." In the same issue, Turnbull also commented on the more complex Expansion Kit, saying that "many experienced players prefer the simpler version — for 'cleanliness' of mechanics sake."

In a 1976 poll conducted by SPI to determine the most popular board wargames in North America, Napoleon at Waterloo was rated 136th out of 202 games.

In Issue 3 of the UK wargaming magazine Phoenix, Rob Gibson accused the game of "lack of realism (does not play like the real battle)." Gibson made four suggestions for rule changes that he felt would improve the game's historicity.

In the 1977 book The Comprehensive Guide to Board Wargaming, Nicholas Palmer called the game an "Excellent introductory game [...] exciting, easy to learn, and over in an hour (hence a favourite at one-day conventions.)" However, due to its simplicity and its age, Palmer thought that "experienced players will not find it very challenging, and the game techniques are no longer all that good an introduction to recent designs." Palmer also reviewed the Expansion Kit, and called it "More to the taste of the hard-core [gamers], but still at the easy end of the scale." He concluded that it was a "Good second game for those who started with the basic version."

Games magazine included Napoleon at War in their "Top 100 Games of 1980", saying, "An ideal introduction to wargaming, Napoleon at Waterloo is one of the most easily learned and played examples of its genre."

In Issue 50 of The Space Gamer, W.G. Armintrout noted that the game was specifically designed for new hobbyists, saying, "The rules carefully expose new gamers to such wonders as zones of control, artillery bombardment, and odds-ratio combat." He concluded, "The game, although not quite filled with heart-stopping excitement, is an excellent introduction to the hobby."

In Issue 53 of Moves, Ian Chadwick thought there were balance issues, commenting that "The French have a tough time of winning since the onus is on them to batter the Allies before the Prussians can arrive, and also escape off the board with enough units." Although he thought the then nine-year-old game was still a good introduction to the hobby, he questioned whether more experienced players would find it a challenge, saying "By today's standards, the game simply is not adequate for the average or better gamer, but it is excellent for introducing the young neophyte into the art and science of wargaming." He concluded by giving the game grades of "B" for playability, "C" for historical accuracy, and "B" for component quality.

In Issue 24 of Fire & Movement, Bill Haggart thought this game was "nearly flawless. She is quick, enjoyable, easily learned, and has the allure of [Avalon Hill]'s Waterloo. More importantly, her rules are concise, comprehensive, and wonder of wonders, consistent." However, Haggart did note, "As a simulation, Napoleon at Waterloo is not as successful," citing issues with artillery fire, command control, and overuse of the best units on the board.

In The Guide to Simulations/Games for Education and Training, Martin Campion commented "Neither the advanced game or the standard game are particularly realistic, but the standard game is useful as an introductory game."

In the 1980 book The Complete Book of Wargames, game designer Jon Freeman commented, "Despite its simplicity, a good deal of tension is generated during play." Freeman concluded by giving this game an Overall Evaluation of "Good to Very Good."

== Other reviews and commentary ==
- The Wargamer Vol.1 #4
- International Wargamer Vol.5 #2
- Panzerfaust #63
- Jagdpanther #9
- Battle Flag Vol.1 #26
