= The American Wargamer =

The American Wargamer was a wargaming magazine first published in 1973.

== History and profile ==
The American Wargamer was a small fanzine and the official newsletter of the American Wargaming Association. The first issue appeared in December 1973. Gene McCoy was the founder. The title was renamed Military Digest in 1984 with volume 11, no. 11. It lasted until May 2000. The publisher was McCoy Publishing Enterprises and the headquarters was in Middleton, Wisconsin.

== Reception ==
Steve Jackson reviewed The American Wargamer in The Space Gamer No. 32. Jackson commented that "This seems to be for the serious historical wargame fan - the person who plays a lot of wargames of different periods, likes to talk about them, like to write about them, likes to read about them, likes to argue about them. If you're a 'club' wargamer you may find it worthwhile to join AWA and get American Wargamer. If you're purely into science fiction, fantasy, or role-playing, here may not be much here for you."

== Reviews ==
- Alarums and Excursions #11
- Perfidious Albion #37 (March 1979) p.17
