= Napoleon at War =

Board wargame published in 1975

Napoleon at War, subtitled "Four Battles", is a collection of four board wargames published by Simulations Publications Inc. (SPI) in 1975 that simulates various battles fought by Napoleon.

== Description ==
Napoleon at War is a "quadrigame", a game box holding four thematically connected 2-player board wargames that use a common set of rules, in this case four different battles fought by Napoleon:

- Marengo: Napoleon in Italy, 14 June 1800 (designed by David Isby)
- Jena-Auerstadt: The Battle for Prussia (designed by Tom Walczyk)
- Wagram: The Peace of Vienna (designed by Irad B. Hardy)
- The Battle of Nations: The Encirclement at Leipzig, 16–19 October 1813 (designed by Edward Curran, Frank Davis, and Redmond A. Simonsen)

=== Components ===
The game box contains:

- Four 17" x 22" paper hex grid maps (one for each game) scaled at 400 m (440 yd) per hex (except Battle of Nations, which is scaled at 800 m (870 yd) per hex)
  - The map for Jena-Auerstadt is divided into two maps, with movement boxes connecting the maps, simulating the dual locations of the simultaneous battles
- 400 die-cut counters (100 for each game) with a silhouette of the type of unit on each
- Rulebook of rules common to all four games
- Four rulebooks with rules unique to each game
- small 6-sided die

Many players stated that they would have preferred military symbols on the counters rather than silhouettes.

=== Gameplay ===
The game uses a simple "I Go, You Go" system of alternating player turns taken from SPI's popular Napoleon at Waterloo game published in 1971:

- The French player moves all units desired, and engages in combat.
- The second player then has the same opportunity.

This completes one game turn, which represents 1 hour of daylight. After sunset, night movement is allowed, but not night combat.

=== Scenarios ===
Each game has a historical scenario based on the actual battle, as well as several "what if?" scenarios that change the orders of battle and timing.

== Publication history ==
After the success of SPI's first quadrigame, Blue & Gray: Four American Civil War Battles, published in May 1975, the company quickly produced several more quadrigames over the next six months, including Blue & Gray II, Modern Battles, Island War and Napoleon at War. The latter featured graphic design by Redmond A Simonsen, and debuted strongly, moving to #5 in SPI's Top Ten Games list the month it was published, and staying in the Top Ten for the next six months.

Each of the games in Napoleon at War was also offered for individual sale as a "folio game" packaged in a cardstock folio. Battle of Nations and Jena-Auerstadt proved popular, and were also offered as "Designer's Edition" boxed sets with mounted maps; players could also purchase a set of 15mm metal miniatures for each game from Heritage Models. The miniatures did not sell well, and SPI did not try that experiment again.

After the demise of SPI, Decision Games acquired the rights to some of the SPI game catalogue, and re-published Marengo and Wagram as Japanese-language pull-out games in Tactics magazine in Issue #46 (1986) and Issue #47 (1987) respectively.

== Reception ==
In the December 1975 issue of Airfix Magazine, Bruce Quarrie noted that "Despite the popularity of the Napoleonic period with miniature figure wargamers, board gamers interested in this period have not been particularly well served up till now. so these games are particularly welcome." He commented that the rules were "extremely simple", but found issues with historical accuracy, saying "Unfortunately, as with other Napoleonic board games, Napoleon at War does not accurately re-create the tactical capabilities and restrictions of the time, and the more ingenious player will probably wish to improve the game by devising rules for flank and rear attacks." Quarrie concluded, "Overall verdict — a good one for beginners because it is easy to learn and play, but lacking the detail necessary for accurate historical simulations."

In Issue 2 of Perfidious Albion, Charles Vasey noted that the various "quadrigames" published by SPI "do not show up much difference from one period to another. The basic game mechanics force a Napoleonic marshal to fight in the same way as a Russian tank commander, or Robert E. Lee." Regarding Napoleon at War, Vasey had issues with the Combat Results Table, pointing out that an attacker had more chance of taking heavy casualties while fighting with a 3 to 1 advantage than if the attacker were fighting an equal sized force. As Vasey noted, "This seems the wrong way round to me."

In a 1976 poll conducted by SPI to determine the most popular board wargames in North America, Napoleon at War was rated very highly, placing 23rd out of 202 games. All of the individual games also rated very well in the poll: Jena-Auerstadt placed a very popular 7th, Wagram was 15th, The Battle of Nations was tied with its parent game for 23rd, and Marengo was 44th.

In the 1977 book The Comprehensive Guide to Board Wargaming, editor Nicholas Palmer called the game a "Highly successful Quad," noting that "The high rating [in the SPI poll] is impressive." In the same book, Charles Vasey also reviewed each of the games individually:

- Marengo: Vasey noted that this game was "rated lower than the others," and that "the effect of cavalry is rather artificially simulated."
- Jena-Auerstadt: Vasey recommended SPI's previous publication, La Grande Armée (1972) "for a more strategic simulation." He also noted that "The Prussians are too fragile for good balance."
- Wagram: Vasey called the game a battle "fought on a large, open plain between two fairly equal armies."
- The Battle of Nations: Vasey thought that the game was set up on "The wrong scale for the battle, but a very exciting encirclement struggle."

In the 1980 book The Complete Book of Wargames, game designer Jon Freeman called this "a fine set of game player's games. Mechanics are simple and easily learned, and the games are clean and fast-moving." The games' only weakness, according to Freeman, was "that they don't have many strategic options, so they may get stale after you've played them a few times." Freeman rated Marengo "the smallest, shortest — and best. It provides both players with good offensive opportunities, and the battle is generally not decided until the final attack." On the other side of the coin, he considered Jena-Auerstadt "the least successful" and "fairly dull." Freeman concluded by giving this game an Overall Evaluation of "Very Good".

In The Guide to Simulations/Games for Education and Training, Martin Campion commented, "The games are fast-moving and suggestive of the strategic situation of the original battles. One tactical system is not very realistic but tends to give realistic general results." Compion concluded, "The game maps are excellent. The games are simple and make good introductory games."

In Issue 53 of Moves, Ian Chadwick reviewed Napoleon at War, and gave the quadrigame a grade of "B" for component quality. Chadwick also commented on the individual games, and gave each one grades for Playability and Historical Accuracy:

- Marengo: "The fastest of the [four games] and quite enjoyable [...] it plays well and makes for a good, very quick game." Playability: A / Historical accuracy: C.
- Jena-Auerstadt: "The game is confusing to play if both maps are used, and although I applaud the effort of trying to capture the nature of the actual battle, it has an awkward feel about it." Playability: B / Historical accuracy: B.
- Wagram: "This is the most exciting game in the package. With objectives so conflicting, battle is forced on the players [...] well worth many playings." Playability: A / Historical accuracy: B.
- The Battle of Nations: "Easy and fast to play. The tendency to form long solid lines and slow movement may deter those who prefer the quads with more mobility." Playability: A / Historical accuracy: C

In Issue 24 of Fire & Movement, Bill Haggart commented, "The games are fun, and the discerning player can gain some insight into the respective battles."

Games included Napoleon at War in their "Top 100 Games of 1982", saying "All [four games] use the same movement and combat system, which even a newcomer to wargames will master easily."

== Other reviews and commentary ==
- The American Wargamer Vol.3 #8
- Casus Belli (Issue 7 - Mar 1982)
- Phoenix #1
