= Blue & Gray: Four American Civil War Battles =

Collection of four board wargames published in 1975

Original SPI edition, 1975

Blue & Gray: Four American Civil War Battles is a board wargame originally published by Simulations Publications, Inc. (SPI) in 1975 that simulates four American Civil War battles.

== Description ==
Blue & Gray: Four American Civil War Battles presents a single set of rules, which can be used for four different battles: Shiloh, Antietam, Cemetery Hill (an engagement during the Battle of Gettysburg), and Chickamauga. Because there are four separate games in one box, Blue & Gray became known as a "quadrigame".

In addition to the common set of rules, each battle has a few exclusive rules. Compared to "monster" wargames of the time that had more than 1000 counters and lasted for several days, each of these battles uses 100 or fewer counters and can be completed in a few hours.

=== Games ===
- Shiloh: The Battle for Tennessee, 6–7 April, 1862, designed by Kip Allen, Irad B. Hardy, and Redmond A. Simonsen
- Antietam: The Bloodiest Day, 17 September 1862, designed by Tom Walczyk
- Chickamauga: The Last Victory, 20 September 1863, designed by Irad B. Hardy, Redmond A. Simonsen, and John Young
- Cemetery Hill: The Battle of Gettysburg, 1-3 July, 1863, designed by Edward Curran and Irad B. Hardy

=== Components ===
The original 1976 SPI edition has the following components:

- 400 single-sided die-cut counters (100 for each game)
- four maps (one for each battle)
- rulebook of common rules
- 4 rules sheets containing exclusive rules for each battle
- Player reference sheets

The 1983 TSR edition made a few changes to the contents:

- a single 34" x 22" double sided sheet contains all four maps
- the counters are double-sided, and the starting location is printed on each counter for ease of set-up
- rules rewritten for beginning players, and the exclusive rules for each battle are integrated into the rulebook
- storage bags for the counters

The 1995 edition by Decision Games streamlines the rules into a 16-page rulebook, and includes a 20-page Player Reference.

== Gameplay ==
For their 1971 wargame Napoleon at Waterloo, SPI developed a simple alternating "I Go, You Go" system of turns where one player moves and then fires, followed by the other player. Blue & Gray used this system, which was subsequently also used in most of SPI's quadrigames.

== Publication history ==
In 1975, SPI published their first "quadrigame", Blue & Gray. The new game immediately rose to #1 on SPI's Top Ten Bestseller list the month it was released, and SPI immediately released another quadrigame of Civil War battles titled Blue & Gray II that covered four more Civil War battles. Several more battles were also published in SPI's house magazine Strategy & Tactics.

In 1983, TSR took over SPI and republished a number of SPI properties under the TSR trademark, including Blue & Gray.

In 1995, Decision Games obtained the rights to Blue & Gray and published a new edition that removed the Battle of Antietam and added the First and Second Battles of Bull Run.

In 2008, Kokusai-Tsushin Co. (国際通信社) acquired the rights to Blue & Gray and published a Japanese edition in the November-December 2008 issue of the Japanese magazine Command (#83). Kokusai-Tsushin republished the Japanese version of Blue & Gray in the October 2022 edition of Command.

== Reception ==
In the December 1975 edition of Airfix Magazine, Bruce Quarrie thought that Blue and Gray provided buyers with "four games for practically the price of one. And worth every penny." Quarrie commented that "The battles chosen make for exciting and well balanced play" but did find that three of the scenarios seemed to favor the Union. He concluded "Blue and Gray is recommended both for newcomers to simulation gaming and for the old hands as an entertaining bit of light relief from the complexities of modern boardgaming."

In a 1976 poll of wargamers conducted by SPI to determine the most popular wargame in America, Blue & Gray placed 7th out of 202 wargames, the best result for an SPI land game.

In his 1977 book The Comprehensive Guide to Board Wargaming, Nicholas Palmer called this a "Simple tactical surround-and-destroy system" Looking at the individual games, Palmer thought Antietam was "A close game."; Chickamauga gave the players "lots of options" with "a great deal of manoeuvre and roadblocking"; Cemetery Hill was "a rather bland Gettysburg"; and Shiloh was "fought in very rough terrain, which is rather limiting."

In the 1980 book The Complete Book of Wargames, game designer Jon Freeman called the simple rules and mechanics "ideal for short playing times and for introducing newcomers to wargaming." He noted that only Chickamauga was very fluid, finding the other three were "rather lacking in movement." He thought the special movement restrictions in Shiloh and Antietam "while perhaps necessary for balance, they're tiresome." He concluded by giving Blue & Gray an Overall Evaluation of "Good", saying, "These are solid but unspectacular games suitable for a casual afternoon of beer and pretzels."

In The Guide to Simulations/Games for Education and Training, Martin Campion thought that "The games are simple. The combat system does not pretend to any detailed accuracy but it does tend to produce convincing general results."

In Issue 54 of Moves, Steve List made it clear that he was not a fan of quadrigames, and considered Blue & Gray to be one of the worst. He rated "Cemetery Hill" a D−, saying, "This creation has many deficiencies, so I am not sure where to start." He rated "Shiloh" a C, noting that "The chief defects of this game are those of the quads as a whole, particularly the attack effectiveness rules." He rated "Antietam" a relatively good B−, and "Chickamauga" a B+, calling it "Easily the best of the B&Gs, this has become a perennial convention tournament favorite, mainly because it is exciting and well balanced."

In Issue 14 of Imagine, Roger Musson was very familiar with the original SPI edition, and found much to like in the TSR edition. Although Musson acknowledged there was some downside to the very simple rules, he thought they opened the door to new players: "Its simplicity makes it low on realism but high on playability — a game can be completed easily in an evening or less. The rules are easily learned, and even for the more experienced player, the games can still be a lot of fun." He concluded, "For those interested in making a start in historical wargaming, I cannot think of a better introduction. Recommended."

In Issue 98 of Strategy & Tactics, Steve Winter commented, "While the games are fun to play, action sometimes proceeds along lines very different from the historical events." Winter concluded, "[The] game’s Combat Results Table was taken almost whole from the [Napoleon at War]/Borodino games. While it works well for Napoleonic battles, it ignores the development that made the American Civil War so different from the Napoleonic Wars: the defender’s firepower advantage."

In Issue 6 of Zone of Control, John W. Kisner reviewed the Decision Games edition, and was disappointed that several mistakes and typos had crept into the original maps and game rules, commenting, "it's ... disturbing that the old material was so roughly handled." However, Kisner, a veteran of "monster" wargames that took weeks to complete, was intrigued by the quickness of play, noting, "The beauty of designs like this one is the speed at which games are completed." However, Kisner also noted the lack of detail in the small maps, such as Henry House Hill missing on the map for the Battles of Bull Run. He wrote, "Now I don't want to make a mountain out of a missing molehill, but the map's lack of historical detail is symbolic of an austerity that pervades the design." Kisner concluded by giving the game grades of "Good" for gameplay and "Fair" for historicity", saying, "It's funny, I didn't feel very good about Blue & Gray the day before or the day after a game — but had a great time while I played. Yesterday, that was cause-and-effect enough to classify it as a classic. As it still should be, today."

In a retrospective review in Simalcrum #20, Steve Newberg, Peter Bartlett and Luc Olivier commented "As the first of the quad games, Blue & Gray set the mold. The fact that Blue & Gray was based on the Borodino/ NAW system pretty much explains why, though these games are often rather fun, they are not very good simulations of American Civil War battles."

== Recognition ==
At the 1976 Origins Awards, Blue & Gray was a finalist for a Charles S. Roberts Award in the "Best Professional Game" category.

== Other reviews ==
- Fire & Movement's Guide to Strategy Gaming
- Fire & Movement Issues 19, 58, 83, 85, 86, 89, Special Issue #1
- The Wargamer, Issues 3, 32
- Panzerfaust #76
- Paper Wars #24
- Outposts #5
- Pursue & Destroy, Vol.1 No. 3
- Enfilade Vol. 1 No. 1
