= Remagen: Bridgehead on the Rhine =

1976 WWII board wargame

Cover of SPI folio edition, 1976

Remagen: Bridgehead on the Rhine, March 1945 is a board wargame published by Simulations Publications Inc. (SPI) in 1976 that simulates the Battle of Remagen during World War II. The game was originally published as part of the Westwall: Four Battles to Germany "quadrigame" — a gamebox containing four games simulating four separate battles that all use the same rules. Remagen was also published as an individual "folio game."

== Background ==
In March 1945, German forces had dug in on the east bank of the Rhine River, their last line of defense, and had blown 21 bridges across the wide river, keeping the Allies at bay on the west bank. When American forces approached the small town of Remagen, they were surprised to find the Ludendorff Bridge still intact — the Germans had wired it with explosives, but a large number had not ignited. The Americans quickly overwhelmed the local garrison and captured the bridge, then moved six divisions over the bridge in ten days as the Germans counterattacked, trying to recapture or demolish the bridge.

== Description ==
Remagen is a two-player wargame where one player controls the American forces trying to take and hold the bridge, and the other controls the German defenders. With only 100 counters and relatively few rules, this game has been characterized as emphasizing "simple rules and playability."

=== Gameplay ===
The game uses a standard "I Go, You Go" alternating turn system taken from SPI's previous publication Napoleon at Waterloo, where one player moves and attacks, then the other player does the same. This completes one game turn, which represents 8 hours of the battle.

The game designers faced the issue that the original battle was not an even match — three divisions of Americans had rolled over the small German garrison guarding the bridge. To give the German player a chance to win, the designers created rules to rebalance the game, noting, "In essence, the battle was one which the Americans could not lose and the problem was to come up with some conditions under which they could be made to lose in the game."

One rule imposed on the American player is the "Continuous Front": Once American units have crossed over to the east side of the Rhine, they must form a contiguous line. Each gap in the line at the end of the American player's turn gives the German player five Victory Points. Another rule is that American units cannot cross a Limit of Advance Line.

Several critics did not like this attempt to rebalance an essentially unbalanced battle.

=== Scenarios ===
The game comes with the main battle scenario, as well as a "what if?" scenario which asks what would have occurred if the Germans had reacted more quickly to the American seizure of the bridge.

== Publication history ==
After the success of SPI's first quadrigame, Blue & Gray, in 1975, the company quickly produced more quadrigames, including Westwall: Four Battles to Germany in 1976, consisting of the four games Arnhem, Bastogne, Hurtgen Forest, and Remagen. The latter, designed by Kip Allen, Stephen B. Patrick, and Redmond A. Simonsen, and with graphic design by Simonsen, was also offered for individual sale as a "folio game" — a game packaged in a cardstock folio. It did not crack SPI's Top Ten Bestseller list.

In 1993, Rampart Games acquired the license for the game, and republished it with backprinted counters to allow for "step reduction" — units take two hits before being eliminated, their counters being flipped over to show half-damage when they are hit the first time. To account for this, the attack and defense strength of all units was doubled. However, since the Combat Results Table was not modified to allow for step reduction, critic Dav Vandenbroucke felt that this "essentially trashed combat resolution."

== Reception ==
In the 1977 book The Comprehensive Guide to Board Wargaming, Nicky Palmer called the game "A rather contrived simulations of the capture of the famous bridge, and the ensuing battle."

In the October 1976 issue of Airfix Magazine, Bruce Quarrie noted that the game "has been heavily doctored by the designers to give the Germans a reasonable chance of winning!"

In Issue 6 of the British wargaming magazine Phoenix, Jeff Parker commented, "The capture of the rail bridge over the Rhine at Remagen is the subject of the final game of the [Westwall] set, and a poor subject it is. [...] to make a playable game of such an uneven contest requires a little distortion of history." Parker concluded that the designers "have succeeded in producing quite an interesting scenario., It is not, however, the battle for the Remagen bridge. No more need be said."

In Issue 20 of Simulacrum, Dav Vandenbroucke compared Remagen to the other three games in the Westwall box and wrote, "Remagen is the goofy one. The American player is hamstrung more by the special rules than the Germans. There are whole turns early in the game when literally nothing happens, because the Americans have reached the limits of their continuous front, and there are no German units on the map!" Vandenbroucke concluded by calling Remagen a "victory condition game" because, "one side has little chance to achieve what the history books would call a victory. The best [...] the Germans [can expect] in Remagen is to lose less badly than their historical counterparts."
