= Bundeswehr (board game) =

1977 Hypothetical Cold War board wargame

- Designers: Virginia Mulholland
- Illustrators: Redmond A. Simonsen
- Publishers: Simulations Publications Inc.
- Publication: 1977
- Genres: Cold War

Bundeswehr, subtitled "Northern Germany, late 1970s", is a board wargame published by Simulations Publications Inc. (SPI) in 1977 that simulates a hypothetical invasion of West Germany in the late 1970s by Warsaw Pact forces.

== Description ==
Bundeswehr is a two-player game where one player controls British and West German forces representing NATO, and the other player controls Warsaw Pact forces. Unusually for wargames of the time set in post-war Europe, no American units are used in the game.

=== Gameplay ===
With a small 17" x 22" hex grid map and 100 counters, this game has been characterized as "basically simple". Each turn, which represents 12 hours of game time, consists of five phases:

- Special Weapons Fire (both players)
- First Player Movement
- First Player Combat
- Second Player Movement
- Second Player Combat

The game borrows the "untried unit" rule from SPI's Panzergruppe Guderian wargame: Units of each type are shuffled and placed in starting positions upside down so that neither player is aware of their combat strengths. When each unit is engaged in combat for the first time, the unit counter is flipped right side up to display its actual combat strength. There are also rules for nuclear weapons — taken from the previously published game Wurzburg — and bridge demolitions.

=== Scenarios ===
Bundeswehr includes three sequentially-linked scenarios, which all take ten turns:

1. "Soviet Invasion": Soviet forces attempt to sweep across the North German Plain.
2. "NATO Counterattack": NATO forces, which had initially pulled back, detect a weakness in the Soviet line and counterattack.
3. "Final Soviet Assault": The Soviets make one last attempt to break the NATO line.

== Publication history ==
When SPI decided to release a sequel to Modern Battles, a collection of four games in one box, company president Jim Dunnigan thought it would be a good opportunity to allow people outside the design department to try their hand at game design. One such employee was Virginia Mulholland, who worked in the company's library. Dunnigan assigned her to develop a hypothetical Soviet invasion of West Germany titled North German Plain, a companion piece to Wurzburg, a hypothetical Soviet invasion of Germany that had been published in 1975. Mulholland took on the task but after completing it, she left the company before her game, retitled Bundeswehr, reached the market in 1977, as part of a four-game collection titled Modern Battles II with graphic design by Redmond A. Simonsen. The collection proved proved popular, rising to #6 on SPI's Top Ten Bestseller list as soon as it was published and staying on the list for four months. Bundeswehr was also sold individually as a "folio" game, packaged in a cardstock folio.

== Reception ==
In Issue 9 of Fire & Movement, Phil Kosnett noted "What strikes you immediately about [the game map] is that nothing strikes you immediately ... The terrain is boring, a succession of minor rivers, minor woods, bogs, and heather." Kosnett did not like the air superiority system either, calling it "a somewhat drab and predictable system that allows very little variability." Kosnett even suggested that the nuclear weapons rules be replaced by a variant system that had appeared in JagdPanther. Kosnett concluded, "The three scenarios are boring, too. There is a sameness about them I find disappointing."

In Craft, Model, and Hobby Industry Magazine, Rick Mataka noted the quality of the components, calling them "professionally produced", and emphasized the contemporary nature of the game.

In The Guide to Simulations/Games for Education and Training, Martin Campion noted the simplicity of the game rules, except for the artillery rules that "tend to put a larger strain than usual on players' abilities to add numerous numbers in their heads and to consider several alternatives at the same time."

In the 1980 book The Complete Book of Wargames, game designer Jon Freeman commented in the introduction of the book that "a game based on a battle that never took place has two major attractions for non-historians. First, you are not playing in the shadow of Napoleon or Rommel. [...] Second, you do not have the original tactics and strategies to fall back on: you must be innovative." Freeman also noted "the element of speculation is quite limited: [...] the data for such potential conflicts are available today."

In Issue 13 of JagdPanther, John Herlocker found that the rules "fall flat when it comes to nuclear weapons. No attempt is made to differentiate in regard to target and terrain, the range attenuation system is unrealistic; fires and devastation are ignored." Herlocker then went on to suggest several rule changes to fix the problems.

Doug Murphy noted "Bundeswehr is one of a few wargames designed by a woman, and about the NATO/Warsaw Pact era without any American units."

== Other reviews and commentary ==
- Fire & Movement #16
- The Wargamer Vol.1 No. 7
