= Breitenfeld (wargame) =

Board wargame

Issue #55 of Strategy & Tactics, which contained the pull-out game Breitenfeld

Breitenfeld, subtitled "Triumph of the Swedish System", is a board wargame published by Simulations Publications Inc. (SPI) in 1976 that simulates the 1631 Battle of Breitenfeld during the Thirty Years' War. Breitenfeld was a free game that appeared in Strategy & Tactics, designed to promote SPI's soon-to-be-launched wargame Thirty Years War. Breitenfeld proved popular and was also published as part of SPI's "folio" series of games.

== Background ==
From 1618 to 1648, a series of religious conflicts between Protestant and Catholic states broke out in Europe, killing an estimated 4 to 8 million soldiers and civilians. In 1631, an Imperial-Catholic League Army led by Generalfeldmarschall Johann Tserclaes, Count of Tilly besieged the Protestant town of Leipzig. A joint Swedish-Saxon army led by King Gustavus Adolphus of Sweden and Saxon Elector John George I engaged Tilly's army outside the village of Breitenfeld in an attempt to lift the siege.

== Description ==
Breitenfeld is a two-player wargame in which one player controls the Swedes, and the other player controls the Imperial army.

=== Components ===
The game includes:

- 22" x 17" paper hex grid map scaled at 175 m (191 yd) per hex
- 100 die-cut counters
- Rulesheet

=== Gameplay ===
Breitenfeld uses the same "I Go, You Go" alternating system of turns originally used in SPI's 1971 game, Napoleon at Waterloo:

- The first player moves all units desired, and engages in combat.
- The second player then has the same opportunity.

This completes one game turn, which represents 45 minutes of game time.

However, in a change from the Napoleon at Waterloo rules:

- zones of control are "rigid" but not "sticky": a unit moving adjacent to an enemy unit can continue to move onwards without stopping, but if the unit chooses to stop adjacent to an enemy, combat must ensue.
- artillery can fire and be captured, but cannot be moved.
- Leader counters add their rating to a unit's combat strength and can help rally disrupted units.
- Each game specifies a number of losses that an army must suffer before "demoralization" is reached. If an army is demoralized, it cannot fight, and its movement is increased (simulating headlong retreat).
- A unit that is disrupted as a result of combat cannot fight; the player must roll a die at the start of the next turn to see if the unit can "shake off" the disruption and return to normal. A leader in the same hex will give a bonus to this die roll.

== Publication history ==
After the success of SPI's first quadrigame, Blue & Gray, released in May 1975, the company quickly produced more quadrigames, including Blue & Gray II, Napoleon at War, and Modern Battles. Their next quadrigame, Thirty Years War, was to be published in May 1976. In order to promote this launch, the March 1976 issue of Strategy & Tactics featured an article by Albert Nofi about the war's historical background. Accompanying the article was a free pull-out game designed by Jay Nelson titled Breitenfeld. Using the same game system as the four games in Thirty Years War, Breitenfeld was what Nelson characterized as "the flagship game" of Thirty Years War. Breitenfeld proved to be popular, and was also published as a standalone "folio" game (a game packaged in a cardstock folio.)

== Reception ==
Writing for Jagdpanther, Daniel S. Salter found several faults with the rules, the most egregious being that the swamp and river in the middle of the map were historically inaccurate and should be ignored. (Salter added that SPI had acknowledged the error and had apologized for it.) Salter noted the unlimited range of the artillery was historically unrealistic for armament of the time. Salter also pointed out that the Saxons, when they were demoralized in the original battle, ran at full speed from the battlefield, and suggested that if Saxon units become demoralized during the game, that the Saxon counters simply be removed from the game.

In Issue 7 of Perfidious Albion, Geoff Barnard and Charles Vasey exchanged thoughts about the game. Barnard commented, "The present game was a most refreshing change from some of the other Quad systems, most particularly in the manner in which the revised [zone of control] and [Combat Resolution Table] system removes the rather devastating effects of surrounds, hence creating potential for more fluid battles with lots of to-ing and fro-ing." Vasey replied, "I was very pleased with the way SPI designers had done their work. It is not an accurate game ... But then the game only claims realism as its second objective, as to maximum playability it is a great success." Barnard concluded, "On the basis of this game I will definitely buy the [30 Years War] Quad." Vasey concluded, "The game is a marvel of 'underdesigning' with a lot of good design work hidden away. I await the [Thirty Years War] Quad with interest."

In his 1977 book The Comprehensive Guide to Board Wargaming, Nick Palmer called it "a good brisk game using the system of the Thirty Years War Quad."

In The Guide to Simulations/Games for Education and Training, Martin Campion noted that this game "allows the Imperialists to make short work of the Saxons as was done historically." He also recommended that "Since the mapboard of this game contains a nonexistent marshy stream, anyone who plays the game ought to simply ignore that terrain feature."

American game designer Chris Crawford called Breitenfeld "the best of the Thirty Years War Quadrigames, which featured a combat system guaranteed to produce desperate battles." Crawford found the game very balanced, saying, "The battles always ended with each general desperately looking for one last undisrupted regiment to throw into the fight and turn the tide. The resolution of the game was always in doubt up until the last turn, and the ending was always dramatic."

In the 1980 book The Complete Book of Wargames, game designer Jon Freeman noted that at a time when "more and more games require a great investment in time to play to conclusion," the short and simple Breitenfeld "thus serves a need too often neglected in wargaming." Freeman concluded by giving the game an Overall Evaluation of "Good", saying, "It's a simple, fast-moving game suited for the novice or an experienced gamer looking more for fun than for a challenge."

In Issue 20 of Simulacrum, Tom Johnston and Luc Olivier found that "The game is easy and fun to play. It is well balanced and both sides have a good chance to win. All in all, Breitenfeld is a good game with high replay value."

== Other reviews and commentary ==
- The Wargamer Vol.1 #17
- Panzerfaust #72
- Strategist #206
