= Four Battles in North Africa =

Board wargame published in 1976

Four Battles in North Africa is a collection of four board wargames published in 1976 by Simulations Publications, Inc. (SPI) that simulate various battles during the North African Campaign of World War II.

== Description ==
Four Battles in North Africa presents a single set of rules, which are used for four different battles: In addition, each battle has a few rules unique to the situation.

The game system is adapted from SPI's 1972 Napoleonic wargame The Battle of Borodino: Napoleon in Russia 1812, which uses a simple alternating series of turns, where one player moves and fires, followed by the other player. To keep the game relatively simple, units cannot be stacked, and each unit's zone of control is "rigid" — enemy units moving into the zone of control must stop and engage in combat. A new rule allows the defender to call upon long-range artillery and air support.

=== Battles ===
The four battles included in the box are:

- Crusader: Designed by Frank Davis and David Isby, this game simulates Operation Crusader, an Allied offensive in November–December 1941 which led to the lifting of the first Siege of Tobruk. Three scenarios are included: two short scenarios of six turns, and one overall campaign scenario of 20 turns.
- Cauldron: A simulation of the Battle of Gazala of May–June 1942 (an Axis victory which led to the Fall of Tobruk), designed by Howard Barasch.
- Supercharge: Three scenarios about the Battle of El Alamein, designed by Greg Costikyan, Frank Davis, and Redmond A. Simonsen
- Kasserine: The pre-emptive German strike against recently landed American forces at Kasserine Pass, designed by Jay Nelson.

== Publication history ==
After SPI pioneered the idea of four games in one box that shared a single set of rules with Blue and Gray in 1975, the concept proved to be popular, and SPI quickly published several more "quadrigames". One of these was Four Battles in North Africa, which was released in 1976 with graphic design by Redmond A. Simonsen. The game debuted at #2 on SPI's Top Ten Bestseller List the month it was released, but fell off the list after only four months. Each of the games was also released individually as a "folio game" (packaged in a cardstock folio).

== Reception ==
In Issue 9 of the UK wargaming magazine Phoenix, Ralph Vickers noted the inclusion of four different games — two of which also involved three scenarios each — and commented "For the price it's a rich feast." He liked the improvements made to the basic Borodino rules, calling them "a good example of how far wargame design has progressed in the few years since the advent of Borodino." However, he had issues with several errors and ambiguities that he felt should have been caught by rigorous playtesting. He gave an in-depth review of one of the games, Crusader, and concluded "If all of the games and scenarios are typical of this one, then all are first rate."

In Fire & Movement #6, Warren Williams noted, "As you look at the rules to SPI's North Africa quad, you will notice an amazing similarity to the same publisher's Modern Battles quad. There is a good reason for it — they are the same with some minor changes and a few additions. (Well, let’s face it, it cuts the cost.) Several issues later, Williams added the comment, "Quadrigames are simple, easy to play and require a short period of time (1-2 hours) to complete. There's no need for a tremendous amount of concentration.... The beauty of the system is its simplicity — you can concentrate on the game and not the game mechanics and rules."

In his 1977 book The Comprehensive Guide to Board Wargaming, Nick Palmer described all four games as "distinctly more complex than usual, though still very playable." Palmer also reviewed each of the individual games:

- Crusader: Pamler noted the emphasis on mobile warfare "as the British try to relieve the fortress."
- Cauldron: "Much longer (twenty-six turns) that usual Quad games." Palmer warned that "control of Tobruk is crucial."
- Kasserine: Palmer found this "much less fluid than most North African campaigns, with tense struggles for key positions."
- Supercharge: "More open country than the other games in the Quad, apart from the main German defence line."

In The Guide to Simulations/Games for Education and Training, Martin Campion thought "The games play well, but are not very convincing as representations of World War II desert warfare."

== Other reviews and commentary ==
- Fire & Movement #10 and #60
