= Nordlingen (wargame) =

Board wargame

Cover of folio game edition, 1976

Nordlingen, subtitled "6 September 1634 – Triumph of the Imperialists", is a board wargame published by Simulations Publications Inc. (SPI) in 1976 that simulates the 1634 Battle of Nordlingen during the Thirty Years' War. Nordlingen was originally sold as one of four separate games packaged together in Thirty Years War, a "quadrigame" (a box with four related games that use the same rules). Many critics called it the best game of the four, and Nordlingen was also published as a separate game.

== Background ==
From 1618 to 1648, a series of religious conflicts between Protestant and Catholic states broke out in Europe, killing an estimated 4 to 8 million soldiers and civilians. In 1634, a coalition of Imperialist troops and Spanish soldiers led by Cardinal-Infante Ferdinand and Ferdinand of Hungary besieged a Swedish force garrisoned at Nordlingen in Bavaria, and dug themselves into a strong entrenchment around the town. A Swedish-German army led by Gustav Horn and Bernhard of Saxe-Weimar arrived and tried to lift the siege by means of a frontal assault against the entrenched Imperialist-Spanish forces.

== Description ==
Nordlingen is two-player wargame in which one player controls the Imperialist-Spanish army, and the other player controls the Swedish-German army.

=== Components ===
The game includes:

- 22" x 17" paper hex grid map scaled at 175 m (191 yd) per hex
- 100 die-cut counters
- Rulebook for Thirty Years War with rules common to all four games
- Rule sheet with rules unique to Nordlingen including:
  - Special Swedish cavalry charge
  - separate demoralization for infantry and cavalry
  - strength of Swedish infantry and leaders is tripled during the first turn
  - all disrupted units are eliminated if not stacked with a leader

=== Gameplay ===
Nordlingen uses the same "I Go, You Go" alternating system of turns originally used in SPI's 1971 game, Napoleon at Waterloo:

- The first player moves all units desired, and engages in combat.
- The second player then has the same opportunity.

This completes one game turn, which represents 45 minutes of game time.

However, in a change from the Napoleon at Waterloo rules:

- zones of control are "rigid" but not "sticky": a unit moving adjacent to an enemy unit can continue to move onwards without stopping, but if the unit chooses to stop adjacent to an enemy, combat must ensue.
- artillery can fire and be captured, but cannot be moved.
- Leader counters add their rating to a unit's combat strength and can help rally disrupted units.
- Each game specifies a number of losses that an army must suffer before "demoralization" is reached. If an army is demoralized, it cannot fight, and its movement is increased (simulating headlong retreat).
- A unit that is disrupted as a result of combat cannot fight; the player must roll a die at the start of the next turn to see if the unit can "shake off" the disruption and return to normal. A leader in the same hex will give a bonus to this die roll.

== Publication history ==
After the success of SPI's first quadrigame, Blue & Gray, released in May 1975, the company quickly produced more quadrigames, including Blue & Gray II, Napoleon at War, Modern Battles, and Thirty Years War, which was published in 1976 and included Lützen, Rocroi, Freiburg, and Nordlingen. The latter was designed by Tom Walczyk, with graphic design by Redmond A. Simonsen. Thirty Years War debuted at #6 in SPI's Top Ten Games list the month it was published, and Nordlingen was also well-received, with several critics calling it the strongest game of the four. Nordlingen was also released as a separate "folio" game (packaged in a cardstock folio rather than a box), but it did not crack SPI's Top Ten list.

== Reception ==
In Issue 9 of Fire & Movement, Roy Schelper called Nordlingen's map "easily the most interesting of the [four games of Thirty Years War], with eight major hills, rough terrain, woods, and four towns." He noted that, because the Swedish force is split into two groups early in the game, "Most of the game's real decisions will be made by the Imperialist player, who must decide how much to commit against the two Swedish groups." Schelper concluded "Nordlingen favors the Imperialists, but a Swedish victory is possible."

In his 1977 book The Comprehensive Guide to Board Wargaming, Nicholas Palmer called Nordlingen "The best of the Thirty Years War Quad, with strategic problems rearing their ugly heads beside the usual tactical questions in Quad games." He concluded, "If the Imperialists get their calculations right they probably have an edge, but both sides have nail-biting dilemmas throughout." In his 1980 sequel, The Best of Board Wargaming , Palmer admitted that "Nordlingen is one of my favourites. [...] the game continues to defy total analysis. Pacing of attacks is vital, since the side whose losses first exceed the demoralization level will melt away in a couple of turns."

In Issue 25 of the UK wargaming magazine Phoenix, Chris Bramall commented that "the issue invariably remains in doubt for much of the game; in combat factors, the two sides are well matched." In terms of strategy, Bramall recommended that "The key to success in Nordlingen is undoubtedly balance. Both players must ensure that their defensive wing is strong enough to deal with any possible attack, but not so strong as to prevent the attacking wing from being successful." He concluded, "Nordlingen is probably the best balanced game in the quad. Indeed it is one of the most exciting of all the folio games SPI has produced, and not the least because luck is less important and skill moreso."
