= Yugoslavia: The Battles for Zagreb, 1979 =

1977 Hypothetical Cold War board wargame

Yugoslavia
- Designers: Phil Kosnett
- Illustrators: Redmond A. Simonsen
- Publishers: Simulations Publications Inc.
- Publication: 1977
- Genres: Cold War

Yugoslavia: The Battles for Zagreb, 1979 is a board wargame published by Simulations Publications Inc. (SPI) in 1977 that simulates a hypothetical invasion of Yugoslavia by Warsaw Pact forces. One scenario, created in 1976, predicts the civil war that occurred 15 years later when Croatia broke away from Yugoslavia.

== Description ==
Yugoslavia is a two-player game where in three scenarios, one player controls Yugoslavian and NATO forces, and the other player controls Warsaw Pact forces. A fourth scenario is designed for three players, where one player controls NATO forces, one player controls Yugoslavian forces, and one player controls Soviet forces.

=== Gameplay ===
With a small 17" x 22" hex grid map and 100 counters, this game has been characterized as "basically simple". Each turn, which represents 12 hours of game time, consists of five phases:

- Special Weapons Fire (both players)
- First Player Movement and Combat
- Second Player Movement and Combat

The game borrows the "untried unit" rule from SPI's Panzergruppe Guderian wargame: Units of each type are shuffled and placed in starting positions upside down so that neither player is aware of their combat strengths. When each unit is engaged in combat for the first time, the unit counter is flipped right side up to display its actual combat strength. There are also rules dealing with river crossings, helicopters and paratroops.

=== Scenarios ===
Four scenarios are included in the game. The first two are sequentially linked:

1. "Thrust for Zagreb" (16 turns): The Warsaw Pact has invaded Yugoslavia and targets the Croatian capital of Zagreb. One player controls NATO and Yugoslavian forces, the other controls the Warsaw Pact forces.
2. "Relief Column" (12 turns): Soviets have taken Zagreb, and now must defend it against a counterattack.

The third scenario is a three-player game between Soviet, NATO and Yugoslavian forces:

- "Battle for Zagreb" (16 turns): Yugoslavia rejects the efforts of both the Soviets and NATO and attempts to force both of them out of Zagreb.

The fourth scenario, written in 1976, predicted the break-up of Yugoslavia, albeit 15 years too early:

- "Civil War" (12 turns): This scenario posits that Tito dies in 1976 — he actually died four years later, in 1980 — and without his strong leadership, Croatia declares independence. The Yugoslav army is split into Croatian and Serbian forces. NATO (ally of Croatia) and the Soviets (ally of Serbia) enter the fray on the side of their clients.

== Publication history ==
When SPI decided to release a sequel to Modern Battles, a collection of four games in one box, company president Jim Dunnigan thought it would be a good opportunity to allow people outside the design department to try their hand at game design. One such employee was Phil Kosnett, a 15-year-old working part-time at SPI while attending high school. Kosnett, who had just finished creating the tactical wargame Airborne! for publication in JagdPanther, was given the task of making a small and simple game to simulate a hypothetical Soviet invasion of Yugoslavia. The result, Yugoslavia: The Battles for Zagreb, 1979, was released in 1977 as part of a four-game collection titled Modern Battles II with graphic design by Redmond A. Simonsen. The collection proved proved popular, rising to #6 on SPI's Top Ten Bestseller list as soon as it was published and staying on the list for four months. Yugoslavia was also sold individually as a "folio" game, packaged in a cardstock folio.

Game designer Phil Kosnett later wrote that after the game was published in 1977, an officer of the Yugoslavian mission to the UN came to SPI to ask questions about the game, and was particularly interested in the Yugoslavian Civil War scenario, although "He remarked with a bit of a sniff that if we were going to publish games suggesting there was a possibility of Yugoslavia fragmenting into civil war, we should label them as science fiction. If only he had been right." Kosnett would go on to a career as an American diplomat, and ironically, his final posting was as U.S. Ambassador to the Republic of Kosovo, formerly a part of Yugoslavia, and geographically close to the setting in his first wargame.

== Reception ==
In Craft, Model, and Hobby Industry Magazine, Rick Mataka noted the quality of the components, calling them "professionally produced", and emphasized the contemporary nature of the game.

In The Guide to Simulations/Games for Education and Training, Martin Campion noted the simplicity of the game rules, except for the artillery rules that "tend to put a larger strain than usual on players' abilities to add numerous numbers in their heads and to consider several alternatives at the same time."

In the 1980 book The Complete Book of Wargames, game designer Jon Freeman commented that "a game based on a battle that never took place has two major attractions for non-historians. First, you are not playing in the shadow of Napoleon or Rommel. [...] Second, you do not have the original tactics and strategies to fall back on: you must be innovative." Freeman also noted "the element of speculation is quite limited: [...] the data for such potential conflicts are available today."

== Other reviews and commentary ==
- Fire & Movement #16
- The Wargamer Vol.1 No. 7
