= Rocroi (wargame) =

Board wargame

Cover of the folio edition, 1976

Rocroi, subtitled "19 May 1643 – The End of Spanish Ascendancy", is a board wargame published by Simulations Publications Inc. (SPI) in 1976 that simulates the 1643 Battle of Rocroi during the Thirty Years' War. Rocroi was originally sold as one of four separate games packaged together in Thirty Years War, a "quadrigame" (a box with four related games that use the same rules), but it was also published as an individual game. It received mixed reviews from critics, some of whom called it a "bland tactical problem", while others declared it was the best game of the four in the Thirty Years War box.

== Background ==
From 1618 to 1648, a series of religious conflicts between Protestant and Catholic states broke out in Europe, killing an estimated 4 to 8 million soldiers and civilians. In 1642, France joined the fight against Imperial forces, and the following year, a Spanish army featuring the feared Tercios infantry advanced from the Spanish Netherlands through the Ardennes into northern France, with the aim of forcing France to sign a peace treaty. When the army stopped to besiege the town of Rocroi, a French army under the command of the 21-year-old Duke of Enghien advanced to confront them.

== Description ==
Rocroi is a two-player wargame in which one player controls the Spanish army, and the other player controls the French army.

=== Components ===
The game includes:

- 22" x 17" paper hex grid map scaled at 175 m (191 yd) per hex
- 100 die-cut counters
- Rulebook for Thirty Years War with rules common to all four games
- Rule sheet with rules unique to Rocroi including special rules for cavalry charges.

=== Gameplay ===
Rocroi uses the same "I Go, You Go" alternating system of turns originally used in SPI's 1971 game, Napoleon at Waterloo:

- The first player moves all units desired, and engages in combat.
- The second player then has the same opportunity.

This completes one game turn, which represents 45 minutes of game time.

However, in a change from the Napoleon at Waterloo rules:

- zones of control are "rigid" but not "sticky": a unit moving adjacent to an enemy unit can continue to move onwards without stopping, but if the unit chooses to stop adjacent to an enemy, combat must ensue.
- artillery can fire and be captured, but cannot be moved.
- Leader counters add their rating to a unit's combat strength and can help rally disrupted units.
- Each game specifies a number of losses that an army must suffer before "demoralization" is reached. If an army is demoralized, it cannot fight, and its movement is increased (simulating headlong retreat).
- A unit that is disrupted as a result of combat cannot fight; the player must roll a die at the start of the next turn to see if the unit can "shake off" the disruption and return to normal. A leader in the same hex will give a bonus to this die roll.

== Publication history ==
After the success of SPI's first quadrigame, Blue & Gray, released in May 1975, the company quickly produced more quadrigames, including Blue & Gray II, Napoleon at War, Modern Battles, and Thirty Years War, which was published in 1976 and included Nordlingen, Lützen, Freiburg, and Rocroi. The latter was designed by Linda Mosca, with graphic design by Redmond A. Simonsen. Thirty Years War debuted at #6 in SPI's Top Ten Games list the month it was published. Rocroi was also released as a separate "folio" game (packaged in a cardstock folio rather than a box), but it did not crack SPI's Top Ten list, and was not rated highly in SPI's player polls.

== Reception ==
In Issue 9 of Fire & Movement, Roy Schelper noted that although historically the French shattered the Spanish army, "The game, however, heavily favours the Spanish." Schelper didn't like the game map, commenting, "Dull is the only word for the Rocroi map. The entire map, except for some unplayable forest hexes on the fringes, consists of clear terrain." He also felt the game lacked a reason for either side to attack, saying, "The best tactic for the French is to stand on the defensive and make the Spanish attack. The Spanish, however, are under no compulsion to attack, and the game can easily degenerate into a fruitless long-range artillery duel."

In his 1977 book The Comprehensive Guide to Board Wargaming, Nick Palmer noted that Rocroi was "possibly the only wargame to date designed by a woman." He thought that "the markedly different movement and combat strengths of the units on each side give each side interesting tactical problems." In his 1980 sequel, The Best of Board Wargaming , Palmer called the game a "bland tactical problem", and although he thought it was worth trying as part of the Thirty Years War quadrigame, he didn't think it was worth buying on its own, saying it was "not of great independent interest."

In Issue 25 of the UK wargaming magazine Phoenix, Chris Bramall was impressed by the strategic thinking necessary, and wrote "it is my belief that Rocroi is the best game of the four [in the Thirty Years War quadrigame]. Admittedly it lacks balance but only if the French player is skilful. Indeed an experienced Spaniard will always beat the tyro Frenchman."

Writing for Battlefield, Howard Anderson also thought this was "the gem of the Thirty Years War Quad." He called the game "as much a contest of will as a battle. The Spanish have no need to attack in the game or in history. The French must come to them." He concluded, "The battle will hinge on the first to falter along the line."

In The Guide to Simulations/Games for Education and Training, history professor Martin Campion surveyed the hundreds of board wargames that had been produced in the 1960s and 70s, and drew up a list of The Twenty Best Military History Simulations. Campion included Rocroi in that list.
