= Freiburg (wargame) =

Board wargame

Folio edition, 1976

Freiburg, subtitled "3–9 August 1644 – Conquest of the Rhine Valley", is a board wargame published by Simulations Publications Inc. (SPI) in 1976 that simulates the 1644 Battle of Freiburg during the Thirty Years' War. Freiburg was originally sold as one of four separate games packaged together in Thirty Years War, a "quadrigame" (a box with four related games that use the same rules), but it was also published as an individual game. It received poor reviews from critics, who called it the weakest of the four games in the Thirty Years War box, "a series of slogging matches", "not much fun", and "relatively boring."

== Background ==
From 1618 to 1648, a series of religious conflicts between Protestant and Catholic states broke out in Europe, killing an estimated 4 to 8 million soldiers and civilians. Late in the war Catholic France, which until then had supported the Protestant side through subsidies and diplomacy, openly entered the war in order to counter the Austrian and Spanish Hapsburgs in a struggle for European dominance. On 28 July 1644, a Bavarian army forced the surrender of the French-controlled city of Freiburg. A French army arrived on 3 August to find the Bavarians well-entrenched around the city. The French attempted frontal assaults on 3 August and 5 August but were repulsed with heavy casualties. The French then attempted to dislodge the Bavarians with a flanking maneuver on 9 August.

== Description ==
Freiburg is a two-player wargame in which one player controls the French army, and the other player controls the Bavarians.

=== Components ===
The game includes:

- 22" x 17" paper hex grid map scaled at 175 m (191 yd) per hex
- 100 die-cut counters
- Rulebook for Thirty Years War with rules common to all four games
- Rule sheet with rules unique to Rocroi including
  - Entrenchments add 1 to the defensive strength of entrenched units.
  - French cavalry may not remain adjacent to an entrenched Bavarian unit.
  - Special rules for cavalry charges.

=== Gameplay ===
Freiburg uses the same "I Go, You Go" alternating system of turns originally used in SPI's 1971 game, Napoleon at Waterloo:

- The first player moves all units desired, and engages in combat.
- The second player then has the same opportunity.

This completes one game turn, which represents 45 minutes of game time.

However, in a change from the Napoleon at Waterloo rules:

- zones of control are "rigid" but not "sticky": a unit moving adjacent to an enemy unit can continue to move onwards without stopping, but if the unit chooses to stop adjacent to an enemy, combat must ensue.
- artillery can fire and be captured, but cannot be moved.
- Leader counters add their rating to a unit's combat strength and can help rally disrupted units.
- Each game specifies a number of losses that an army must suffer before "demoralization" is reached. If an army is demoralized, it cannot fight, and its movement is increased (simulating headlong retreat).
- A unit that is disrupted as a result of combat cannot fight; the player must roll a die at the start of the next turn to see if the unit can "shake off" the disruption and return to normal. A leader in the same hex will give a bonus to this die roll.

=== Scenarios ===
Unlike the other three games of the Thirty Years War quadrigame, which only offer a single scenario, Freiburg has three scenarios representing the three days of the battle (August 3, 5, and 9th). A Campaign Game combines all three scenarios. In addition, there is a "what if" siege scenario that explores what would have happened if the Bavarians had taken shelter inside Freiburg's walls.

== Publication history ==
After the success of SPI's first quadrigame, Blue & Gray, released in May 1975, the company quickly produced more quadrigames, including Blue & Gray II, Napoleon at War, Modern Battles, and Thirty Years War, which was published in 1976 and included the four games Nordlingen, Lützen, Rocroi, and Freiburg. The latter was designed by Stephen B. Patrick, with graphic design by Redmond A. Simonsen. Thirty Years War debuted at #6 in SPI's Top Ten Games list the month it was published. Freiburg was also released as a separate "folio" game (packaged in a cardstock folio rather than a box), but it was rated very low in SPI's player polls, and did not crack SPI's Top Ten list.

== Reception ==
Freiburg was received poorly by critics, who unanimously called it the worst game of the four in the Thirty Years War quadrigame.

In Issue 9 of Fire & Movement, Roy Schelper noted that the game "heavily favors the French. The disparity in numbers makes any Bavarian move, aside from retreating off the map, pointless." He concluded that Freiburg "is not much fun for the Bavarian player since his situation is close to hopeless. The Freiburg scenarios are short enough, however, so that it is feasible to play them twice in one sitting and give each player a taste of annihilation."

In his 1977 book The Comprehensive Guide to Board Wargaming, Nick Palmer thought that Freiburg was "awful", and called it the "Unsatisfactory component of the otherwise excellent Thirty Years War Quad." He noted that "the Campaign game is unplayable due to certain baffling misprints." He concluded "the game remains a series of slogging matches." In his 1980 sequel, The Best of Board Wargaming , Palmer added that "the interesting-looking terrain restricts manoeuvre too much to show the system to advantage", and gave the game a very poor "Excitement" grade of only 20%.

In Issue 25 of the UK wargaming magazine Phoenix, Chris Bramall was not impressed by Freiburg, calling it "a siege game and a relatively boring one at that." He pointed out that "The rules are substantially the same as the other — open — battles in the quad, when a new set of siege rules would have been more appropriate." He concluded, "I don't feel inclined to waste space and time on it here!"
