= Westwall: Four Battles to Germany =

Board wargame published in 1976

WestWall: Four Battles to Germany is a collection of four board wargames published by Simulations Publications (SPI) in 1976 that simulate battles in Europe in late 1944 and early 1945 during World War II.

== Background ==
As Allied forces broke out of Normandy in August 1944 and crossed France, they came up against a strong German defensive line called the Westwall that prevented them from crossing the Rhine River. German defenses stiffened, and the Allies were stymied for many months in their attempts to find a way across the Rhine and into Germany.

== Description ==
Westwall is a "quadrigame" — a game box that contains four separate wargames that use a common set of rules.

- Arnhem: Designed by Jay Nelson. The game simulates the attempt by the Allies to use paratroopers to capture bridges across the Rhine during Operation Market Garden. The game was judged by critics to be the best one in Westwall.
- Bastogne: The game, designed by Kip Allen, Larry Pinsky, and Redmond A. Simonsen, is divided into two scenarios. In the first, the Germans besiege American forces defending Bastogne during the Battle of the Bulge. In the second, the Germans are on the defensive during the subsequent American counterattack. Critics were also very pleased with this game.
- Hurtgen Forest: Designed by Kip Allen, Howard Barasch, and Redmond A. Simonsen. German defenders use the difficult terrain of Hurtgen Forest to slow the American forces to a crawl. Critics thought the game also moved forward at a crawl and lacked excitement.
- Remagen: Designed by Kip Allen, Stephen B. Patrick, and Redmond A. Simonsen. The Germans have destroyed all major bridges across the Rhine in an attempt to keep the Allies crossing into Germany. An American force discovers one undestroyed bridge at Remagen defended by a weak German force and a major battle ensues. Rules for the game were tweaked to give the Germans a fighting chance, but critics still thought this was the weakest game of the set.

=== Components ===
The game box contains:

- four 17" x 22" paper hex grid maps, one for each game, scaled at 850 m (930 yd) per hex
- 400 double-sided die-cut counters (100 per game)
- a Westwall rulebook describing the rules common to all four games
- four rulebooks (one for each game) describing the rules unique to each game
- various charts and players' aids
- a small six-sided die

The individual games were also released as "folio games", and included twenty random number counters in place of the six-sided die.

=== Gameplay ===
The system used for all four games is a revision of the games system developed for Modern Battles. Each turn, which represents 12 hours of game time, consists of five phases:

- Special Weapons Fire (both players)
- First Player Movement
- First Player Combat
- Second Player Movement
- Second Player Combat

Each game also has some rules unique to that particular game.

== Publication history ==
In 1975, SPI published their first "quadrigame", Blue and Gray, a set of four American Civil War battles. The format proved very popular, and SPI quickly produced more quadrigames, one of them being Westwall, published in 1976 with graphic design by Redmond A. Simonsen. Westwall initially sold well, rising to #6 on SPI's Top Ten Bestselling Games list after its release, and staying in the Top Ten for six months.

The four games were also released individually, packaged as "folio games" (games enclosed in a cardstock folio.) Arnhem, the top-rated game in Westwall, was also released in a boxed Designer's Edition. Following the release in 1977 of A Bridge Too Far, a film about Operation Market Garden, SPI immediately acquired the board game rights, and re-released Arnhem as A Bridge Too Far: Arnhem. The new box art featured stills from the film.

== Reception ==
In a 1976 poll conducted by SPI to determine the most popular board wargames in North America, Westwall was the highest rated quadrigame, placing an impressive 15th out of 202 games.

In the 1977 book The Comprehensive Guide to Board Wargaming, Nicholas Palmer noted "it is difficult to design good, simple games of modern combat, because modern combat is very far from simple, but Westwall brings it off, with a modification of the Modern Battles system." In the same book, Charles Vasey reviewed three of the four games:

- Arnhem: "Especially impressive. a multi-faceted game with paratroops playing the key role, with the Allies trying to link up and the Germans harrying their flanks."
- Hurtgen Forest: "Rather boring."
- Remagen: "A rather contrived simulation."

In his 1980 sequel, The Best of Board Wargaming , Nick Palmer added "This has proved the most successful World War II quadrigame, even though two of its games are far from satisfactory." He also reviewed three of the games:

- Arnhem: "This game is a masterpiece. If you can only own one game, this should be it." Palmer lauded its lack of complexity, commenting "Not only is the game simple, but it is also extremely elegant: it really matters how and where you retreat or advance." He also noted that "many of the strategic decisions must be made by the Germans, who are ostensibly the defenders [...] But the Allies too have important decisions to make." Palmer concluded by giving this game an excellent "Excitement grade" of 100%, saying, "It is suitable for beginners, and also for experts."
- Bastogne: "This is an interesting game, for unlike other Battle of the Bulge games, it deals only with the fighting in the immediate vicinity of the town of Bastogne itself." Palmer awarded it an Excitement Grade of 90%.
- Hurtgen Forest: "A drab game with acres and acres of rough terrain and only a few feasible avenues of approach." Palmer gave it a very poor Excitement Grade of 20%.

In the same book, Marcus Watney reviewed Remagen, noting "Bearing in mind the scant German resistance to the American capture of the Rhine bridge at Remagen, it is hardly a surprise that this game is not a success. It is a very artificial game." He concluded by giving the game a zero for Excitement.

In The Guide to Simulations/Games for Education and Training, Martin Campion commented on the possibility of using this game as an educational aid, saying, "The games are fairly simple, and I have used Arnhem and Bastogne as take-home assignments. Of the four, Arnhem is probably the one that comes closest to reflecting important aspects of the battle it presents."

In Issue 6 of the UK wargaming magazine Phoenix, Jeff Parker wrote, "It has become customary to criticise the Quadrigame series for lack of detail and it is true that this feature is a minor irritant in those games dealing with periods of strict linear tactics. It becomes less important in the modern battle games where units are generally a well balanced mix of types and less vulnerable to attacks from flank and rear." He concluded " I am impressed by the way the games played, and this is high praise since I am not a devotee of the simpler type of game." Parker also reviewed each of the games:

- Arnhem: "Superb. The game is fraught with the dangers and difficulties which beset the original operation. [...] I found myself willing the little cardboard counters to cross the last few inches of road on the coloured map to the relief of the battered paratroopers in Arnhem."
- Hurtgen Forest: "Given two competent players the game will faithfully recreate the creeping progress of the Americans, but it is rather like playing a game of chess with nothing but pawns."
- Bastogne: "The campaign scenario tests both players in their offensive/defensive skills, and the sense of urgency required to attain the objectives lends the game some of the excitement of the Arnhem scenario."
- Remagen: "The subject of the final game of the set, and a poor subject it is. [...] To make a playable game of such an uneven contest requires a little distortion of history. The designers admit as much in their notes on the game and, with the necessary modifications, have succeeded in producing quite an interesting scenario. It is not however, the battle for the Remagen bridge. No more need be said."

In the October 1976 issue of Airfix Magazine, Bruce Quarrie wrote "The Quadrigame series is easy to criticise for its lack of detail, but if judged by the same criteria its designers aimed to meet, Westwall gives fair value." Quarrie also gave short reviews of each of the games:

- Arnhem: "As exciting as the real thing [...] Arnhem, at least deserves to become a favourite."
- Bastogne: "A race against time, and it is probably this element of excitement which enables the players to overlook the drawbacks of the Quadrigame system and to just sit back and enjoy the freedom from detail more commonly found in more 'realistic' simulations."
- Hurtgen Forest: "Fairly balanced."
- Remagen: "Heavily doctored by the designers to give the Germans a reasonable chance of winning!"

In Issue 27 of Simulacrum, Dev Vandenbroucke noted, "Like all of the quadrigames, Westwall emphasizes simple rules and playability. [...] These games won’t teach you any deep lessons, but they are historical at their level of abstraction, and you can play each of them in an hour or two." Looking at the individual games, Vandenbroucke thought that "Arnhem, Bastogne, and Hurtgen Forest give you your money’s worth." Regarding Remagen, all he could say was "The best the Germans can expect in Remagen is to lose less badly than their historical counterparts."
