= Lützen (wargame) =

Board wargame

Cover of folio edition, 1976

Lützen is a board wargame published by Simulations Publications Inc. (SPI) in 1976 that simulates the 1632 Battle of Lützen during the Thirty Years' War. Lützen was originally sold as one of four separate games packaged together in Thirty Years War, a "quadrigame" (a box with four related games that use the same rules). Many critics called it one of the better games of the four, and Lützen was also published as an individual game.

== Background ==
From 1618 to 1648, a series of religious conflicts between Protestant and Catholic states broke out in Europe, killing an estimated 4 to 8 million soldiers and civilians. The Battle of Lützen is considered one of the most crucial of the Thirty Years War. In 1632, a combined Swedish-German army led by Gustavus Adolphus assaulted a similarly sized Imperial army led by Albrecht von Wallenstein outside the town of Lützen in Saxony. Although the result was a narrow victory for the Swedish-German army, both sides suffered heavy casualties, and Gustavus was killed while rallying his troops.

== Description ==
Lützen is two-player wargame in which one player controls the Swedish-German army, and the other player controls the Imperial army.

=== Components ===
The game includes:

- 22" x 17" paper hex grid map scaled at 175 m (191 yd) per hex
- 100 die-cut counters
- Rulebook for Thirty Years War with rules common to all four games
- Rule sheet with rules unique to Lützen including:
  - Special rule for fog, which reduces both movement and artillery range.
  - The Imperial supply train may not move, and provides the Swedish army with victory points if destroyed.
  - Swedish cavalry double their strength when attacking disrupted Imperial infantry, but are automatically disrupted following this.
  - If Gustavas dies (as happened in the actual battle), the death, as noted by Nick Palmer "may shatter the Swedes' morale, or alternatively (as actually happened) make them, in the words of the rules, 'rally to a grim all-consuming ferocity.'"

=== Gameplay ===
Lützen uses the same "I Go, You Go" alternating system of turns originally used in SPI's 1971 game, Napoleon at Waterloo:

- The first player moves all units desired, and engages in combat.
- The second player then has the same opportunity.

This completes one game turn, which represents 45 minutes of game time.

However, in a change from the Napoleon at Waterloo rules:

- zones of control are "rigid" but not "sticky": a unit moving adjacent to an enemy unit can continue to move onwards without stopping, but if the unit chooses to stop adjacent to an enemy, combat must ensue.
- artillery can fire and be captured, but cannot be moved.
- Leader counters add their rating to a unit's combat strength and can help rally disrupted units.
- Each game specifies a number of losses that an army must suffer before "demoralization" is reached. If an army is demoralized, it cannot fight, and its movement is increased (simulating headlong retreat).
- A unit that is disrupted as a result of combat cannot fight; the player must roll a die at the start of the next turn to see if the unit can "shake off" the disruption and return to normal. A leader in the same hex will give a bonus to this die roll.

== Publication history ==
After the success of SPI's first quadrigame, Blue & Gray, released in May 1975, the company quickly produced more quadrigames, including Blue & Gray II, Napoleon at War, Modern Battles, and Thirty Years War, which was published in 1976 and included Nordlingen, Rocroi, Freiburg, and Lützen. The latter was designed by Brad Hessel, with graphic design by Redmond A. Simonsen. Thirty Years War debuted at #6 in SPI's Top Ten Games list the month it was published, and Lützen was well received. Lützen was also released as a separate "folio" game (packaged in a cardstock folio rather than a box), but it did not crack SPI's Top Ten list.

== Reception ==
In Issue 9 of Fire & Movement, Roy Schelper noted that "The Swedes must attack swiftly to exploit their 4–3 advantage in numbers before the arrival of the Imperialist reinforcements. [...] The Imperialist player is on the defensive, and must react to the Swedish moves." Schelper concluded, "Lützen is fairly well-balanced, and will generally be resolved in the last few Turns. It's interesting to play either side, and with equal players, a big win is unlikely."

In his 1977 book The Comprehensive Guide to Board Wargaming, Nicholas Palmer called Lützen a "fine member of the Thirty Years War Quad, with a special thrill for Scandinavians (rarely appearing in wargames) as Gustavas Adolphus fights the climactic battle for domination of Europe against the last Imperialist force in Germany." In his 1980 sequel, The Best of Board Wargaming , Palmer noted that "Artillery is less dominant than in Nordlingen because of the protection of the fog, with interesting opportunities for outflanking with cavalry raids." He concluded by giving Lützen a very good "Excitement" grade of 85%.

In Issue 25 of the UK wargaming magazine Phoenix, Chris Bramall also recommended that the Swedish player attack early and often, saying, "the aim of the Swedish player must be to inflict as many losses as possible before the Imperialist reinforcements arrive on game turn 5; on [the Swedish player's] shoulders therefore falls the mantle of attacks." However, Bramall noted the strategic difficulties facing the Swedish player, with the additional difficulty of dealing with the effects of fog, and concluded, "the game is biased in the ratio 60:40 in the Imperialist's favour — prospective Swedish players beware."
