= The Battle for Jerusalem 1967 =

1977 Six Day War board wargame

- Designers: Mark Herman
- Illustrators: Redmond A. Simonsen
- Publishers: Simulations Publications Inc.
- Publication: 1977
- Genres: Arab-Israeli conflict

The Battle for Jerusalem 1967 is a board wargame published by Simulations Publications Inc. (SPI) in 1977 that simulates the battle for East Jerusalem and the West Bank during the Six Day War.

== Background ==
Amid heightened tensions in 1967 between Israel and the surrounding Arab states, Egyptian president Gamal Abdel Nasser closed the Straits of Tiran to Israeli vessels and ordered United Nations peacekeepers out of the region. Israel responded by launching a surprise attack against Egyptian soldiers in the Sinai Peninsula and Jordanian forces in East Jerusalem and the West Bank.

== Description ==
Jerusalem '67 is a two-player game where one player controls Israeli forces, and the other player controls the forces of the Arab coalition.

=== Gameplay ===
With a small 17" x 22" hex grid map and 100 counters, this game has been characterized as "basically simple". Each turn, which represents 12 hours of game time, consists of five phases:

- Special Weapons Fire (both players)
- First Player Movement
- First Player Combat
- Second Player Movement
- Second Player Combat

In order to force the Israeli player to protect Tel Aviv, if any Arab unit is allowed to sit on the Mediterranean coast for two turns, the Arabs are automatic winners. In addition, neither player is allowed to use artillery, airpower or armored units in the Old City of Jerusalem.

=== Scenarios ===
Two scenarios are included in the game:

- Historical scenario (10 turns): The historical struggle for East Jerusalem and the West Bank.
- Two "What-if?" scenarios: Non-historical scenarios where Israel does not enjoy air superiority, has less ground support as a result, and Arab units have greater freedom of movement.

=== Victory conditions ===
In all scenarios, the Israeli player must destroy all four bridges across the Jordan and take all four hexes of Jerusalem. The Arab player wins by preventing either of these conditions. In addition, if the Israeli player loses more than six units, the Israeli level of victory drops by one level, possibly turning an Israeli victory into an Arab victory.

== Publication history ==
In 1976, when SPI decided to release a sequel to Modern Battles, a collection of four games in one box, company president Jim Dunnigan thought it would be a good opportunity to allow people outside the design department to try their hand at game design. One such person was a new employee, Mark Herman, who had just graduated with a bachelor's degree in history from Stony Brook University. Herman was given the task of making a small and simple game to simulate the Lebanese Civil War that had just started. The complexities of the internecine conflict proved to be too complex for a small game, and Herman instead was given the task of simulating the battle for East Jerusalem in 1967's Six Day War. The result, The Battle for Jerusalem 1967, was released in 1977 as part of a four-game collection titled Modern Battles II with graphic design by Redmond A. Simonsen. The collection proved popular, rising to #6 on SPI's Top Ten Bestseller list as soon as it was published and staying on the list for four months. Jerusalem '67 was also sold individually as a "folio" game, packaged in a cardstock folio.

== Reception ==
In Issue 9 of Fire & Movement, Phil Kosnett noted that during play-testing, the game proved to be heavily unbalanced in favor of the Israelis. After adjustments to the Arab units, "now it is very difficult for the Israelis to clear [East Jerusalem] and the entire West Bank in four days as they did historically."

In Craft, Model, and Hobby Industry Magazine, Rick Mataka noted the quality of the components, calling them "professionally produced", and emphasized the contemporary nature of the game.

In The Guide to Simulations/Games for Education and Training, Martin Campion noted the simplicity of the game rules, except for the artillery rules that "tend to put a larger strain than usual on players' abilities to add numerous numbers in their heads and to consider several alternatives at the same time."

In Issue 55 of Moves, Ian Chadwick liked the game, writing, "Overall, the game is fairly good, easy to play, and captures some of the historical flavor of the game." However, Chadwick noted that the rules do not allow for a possible UN ceasefire to be forced on the players. Chadwick also noted the map completely lacked the names of towns, kibbutzim and place-names. Chadwick concluded by giving the game grades of "A" for Playability, "A" for Component Quality, and "B" for Historical Accuracy, saying, "The game is a fair challenge to both sides."

== Other reviews and commentary ==
- Fire & Movement #16
- The Wargamer Vol.1 No. 7
