= Chinese Farm (board game) =

Board games introduced in 1975

Cover of SPI folio edition, 1975

Chinese Farm, subtitled "Egyptian-Israeli Combat in the '73 War", is a board wargame published by Simulations Publications, Inc. (SPI) in 1975 that simulates operational level ground combat between Egypt and Israel at the Battle of the Chinese Farm during the just completed Yom Kippur War of October 1973. Chinese Farm was originally published as part of the "quadrigame" Modern Battles: Four Contemporary Conflicts.

== Description ==
During the Arab-Israeli War of October 1973, Israeli forces opened a bridgehead over the Suez Canal to exploit a perceived gap in the Egyptian line, and instead ran up against a strong force. The battle took place in the vicinity of an Egyptian experimental farm that used Japanese equipment. Israeli observers mistook the Japanese Kanji characters on the machinery for Chinese Hanzi, leading to the misnomer "The Chinese Farm". Chinese Farm is one of four games in the series Modern Warfare published by SPI that serves as an introduction to wargaming.

=== Components ===
The game includes:

- folio to hold game components
- 17" x 22" paper hex grid map scaled at 1 mile (1.6 km) per hex
- 100 counters
- rulebook
- player aids
- six-sided die

=== Scenarios ===
The game includes three scenarios:

1. A short introductory scenario that is only seven turns and includes only ground combat.
2. The complete historical scenario is 12 turns long, and includes Israeli air support and Egyptian SAM missiles.
3. A theoretical and not historically accurate scenario that asks what would have happened if the Egyptians had established better defenses on their side of the Suez Canal.

=== Victory conditions ===
The Israeli player receives game points for geographical gains, while the Egyptian player earns them for eliminating Israeli units. Whoever earns the most points wins the game.

== Publication history ==
SPI published the game Modern Battles: Four Contemporary Conflicts in 1975 using the "quadrigame" concept that SPI had pioneered earlier in 1975 with Blue & Gray: Four American Civil War Battles: a game that contained a single set of rules, but with counters and maps for four different battles. Similarly the box for Modern Battles contained one set of rules for four different battles, including Golan, Wurzburg, Mukden, and Chinese Farm, the latter designed by Howard Barasch, with cartography and graphic design by Redmond A. Simonsen. SPI also released the four games individually as the Modern Warfare series of "folio games", the components contained in a cardstock folder packaged in a plastic bag. Each individual game was also released as a "Collector's Edition" with mounted maps in a 2" accordion box.

In 1979, Hobby Japan published a licensed Japanese-language version.

== Reception ==
In Issue 24 of Moves (December 1975), Ed Carran noted that "The game mechanics are moderately complex, but once assimilated, they become second nature." He concluded that "Observation of even one Game-Tum [...] shows that a fair amount of calculation goes into each combat."

In Issue 55 of Moves, Ian Chadwick noted "It's not a question of whether or not the Israelis will cross the canal, but how well they do so." He concluded by calling it "a very playable game [...] fast and enjoyable", and gave it an A for playability, a C for component quality, and a C for historical accuracy.

In his 1977 book The Comprehensive Guide to Board Wargaming, Nicholas Palmer noted that the Combat Results Table (CRT) "is unsuited to cross-canal actions."

== Other reviews ==
- Close Up: SPI's Chinese Farm and Golan, by Warren G. Williams, in Fire & Movement #2, 1976
- Spotlight: Games of the Arab Israeli Wars, by Keith Poulter, in Wargamer Vol.1 #2, 1977
- SPI's Modern Battles, by Donald Mack, in Wargamer Vol.1 #13
- American Wargamer Vol. 3, No. 7
- Simulacrum #20

== Other sources ==
- Elusive Victory: The Arab-Israeli Wars, 1947-1974, by Trevor N. Dupuy, Harper and Row, New York, 1978
- On the Banks of the Suez, by Avraham Adan, Presidio Press, 1991
- Arabs at War: Military Effectiveness 1948-1991, by Kenneth M. Pollack, University of Nebraska Press, Lincoln, Nebraska, 2002
- Crossing of the Suez, The, by Lt. General Saad El Shazly, American Mideast Research, revised English edition, 2003
