= Anvil-Dragoon: The Second D-Day =

WWII board wargame

- Cover of JagdPanther #12
- Designers: Howard Anderson
- Publishers: JagdPanther Publications
- Publication: 1976
- Genres: World War II

Anvil-Dragoon: The Second D-Day is a board wargame published by JagdPanther Publications in 1976 that simulates the Allied landings in southern France in August 1944 during World War II.

== Background ==
Following the D-Day landings in Normandy, another landing, originally codenamed "Anvil" but then changed to "Dragoon", was made in Provence in August 1944 by a combination of British and French forces. The purpose of the landings was to secure vital shipping ports, bring large numbers of French soldiers into the war to liberate their home country, and draw German forces away from Normandy.

== Description ==
Anvil-Dragoon is a 2-player tactical board wargame in which one side controls Allied forces, and the other side controls Axis forces.

=== Components ===
The game includes a paper map covering southern France from Marseille to the Italian border. The game also includes 144 thin cardstock counters representing fleets, airpower, paratroops, commandos, garrisons, and coastal defense forces.

=== Gameplay ===
The game system uses a standard "I Go, You Go" system of alternating turns, where the Allied player moves and attacks, followed by the Axis player. Special rules cover naval gunfire support, artillery support, evacuating German bureaucracy, secret deployment of variable strength coastal fortresses, and special deployment of armored cavalry divisions. A supply rule forces the Allied player to choose which fronts to advance.

=== Scenarios ===
The game comes with four scenarios:

- Historical invasion
- Hypothetical: If Operation Overlord had happened in southern France rather than Normandy
- Hypothetical: An invasion with only British forces
- Hypothetical: A Battle of Anzio-style invasion to outflank German defenses in Italy.

== Publication history ==
Howard Anderson designed Anvil-Dragoon, which was published in Issue 12 of JagdPanther (January 1976) as a free pull-out game. In 2015, Amarillo Design Bureau released the game as a PDF.

== Reception ==
In Issue 5 of the British magazine Perfidious Albion, Geoff Barnard commented, "While there were some interesting features in the game, in terms of units and rules, I felt the game as a whole began to drag a little once the initial landings were completed. Fortunately, the game is not too long, 10 to 15 turns." Barnard concluded, "it is the Allied player who has to make all the running as he chases the [Victory Point] total. The German player, although he has some interesting units, is forced to use them to try to hold a line together."

In the 1977 book The Comprehensive Guide to Board Wargaming, Charles Vasey noted that this was "Not a popular game as the German player spends most of the time retreating. Even when he wins, he still has lost France!"

In Issue 26 of Simulacrum, Brian Train called this, "a good game if you find fighting withdrawals a diverting and amusing exercise."
