= Thirty Years War (disambiguation) =

The Thirty Years' War was a series of wars in Europe lasting from 1618 to 1648.

Thirty Years' War or Thirty Years War may also refer to:

== Wars ==
- The Mauritanian Thirty Years' War of 1644–74 (in Northwest Africa), also called Char Bouba war
- Second Thirty Years' War, a term sometimes used to encompass the wars in Europe from 1914 to 1945
- The Dano-Bengali Thirty Years' War; a term sometimes used to describe the Dano-Mughal War from 1642-1698

== Other uses ==
- The Thirty Years War, 1938 history book by C. V. Wedgwood
- "The 30 Years War", former name of the band The Fall of Troy
- Thirty Years War (wargame), a 1976 board wargame
