= Cauldron: Battle of Gazala, May 1942 =

1976 WWII board wargame

Cover of folio edition, 1976

Cauldron: Battle of Gazala, May 1942 is a board wargame published by Simulations Publications Inc. (SPI) in 1976 that simulates the Battle of Gazala during World War II. The game was originally published as part of the Four Battles in North Africa "quadrigame" — a gamebox containing four games simulating four separate battles that all use the same rules. Cauldron was also published as an individual "folio game."

== Background ==
During the North African campaign in 1941, British forces had succeeded in pushing Axis forces back away from Tobruk. British intelligence mistakenly believed that German General Erwin Rommel would be unable to mount another offensive until later in the year, but Rommel's forces unexpectedly drove forward in January 1942 and attacked Tobruk. The Axis attack was blunted, and Rommel withdrew to a defensive position near the village of Gazala, in a "cauldron" surrounded on three sides by British forces, and with his back to a minefield. The British then attempted to attack Rommel's forces in the "cauldron".

== Description ==
Cauldron is a game for two players where one player controls the Axis forces, and the other controls the British forces. Mechanized units on both sides provide opportunities for maneuvering. With only 100 counters and relatively few rules, this game has been characterized as "simple, easy to play and requires a short period of time (1-2 hours) to complete."

=== Gameplay ===
The game uses a standard "I Go, You Go" alternating turn system taken from SPI's previous publication The Battle of Borodino, where one player moves and fires, then the other player does the same. This completes one game turn.

Units are not allowed to stack. A unit must stop if it enters an enemy's zone of control, and then must attack the enemy. In most combat results, the loser is only eliminated if it can't retreat, adding impetus to the attacker to maneuver to surround the unit.

=== Scenarios ===
The game offers two scenarios, which can be linked together to form a campaign game.

== Publication history ==
After the success of SPI's first quadrigame, Blue & Gray, in 1975, the company quickly produced more quadrigames, including Four Battles in North Africa in 1976, consisting of the four games Crusader, Supercharge, Kasserine and Cauldron. The latter, designed by Howard Barasch and with graphic design by Redmond A. Simonsen, was also offered for individual sale as a "folio game" — a game packaged in a cardstock folio. It did not crack SPI's Top Ten Bestseller list.

== Reception ==
In the 1977 book The Comprehensive Guide to Board Wargaming, Nick Palmer noted that the game is "much longer (twenty-six turns) than usual Quad games." Palmer warned that "control of Tobruk [is] crucial."

In the Issue 60 of Fire & Movement, Vance von Borries compared this game to the others in the North Africa quadrigame and commented "Again, action is fluid and mobile but with more minefields." He warned that "The strategic attacker, the Allied player, must counterattack to be able to withdraw in good order."

Five years after the game's publication, Dan Campagna wrote in Issue 104 of Campaign "Although SPI's mini-game Cauldron has been on the market a few years, it is never too late to add new knowledge to an old subject." Campagna warned "Cauldron is a game where the opening moves often prove decisive, sometimes fatally so."
