= Kasserine: Baptism of Fire =

1976 WWII board wargame

Cover of folio edition, 1976

Kasserine: Baptism of Fire, February 1943 is a board wargame published by Simulations Publications Inc. (SPI) in 1976 that simulates the Battle of Kasserine Pass during World War II. The game was originally published as part of the Four Battles in North Africa "quadrigame" — a gamebox containing four games simulating four separate battles that all use the same rules. Kasserine was also published as an individual "folio game."

== Background ==
In early 1943, the first American troops landed in North Africa during Operation Torch and set up a defense of the Kasserine Pass, a narrow defile through the Atlas Mountains. German Fieldmarshal Erwin Rommel led a carefully planned attack with his battle-hardened soldiers against the inexperienced Americans in an attempt to quickly eliminate them.

== Description ==
Kasserine is a game for two players where one player controls the Axis forces, and the other controls the Allied forces. The map recreates the narrow passages and rough terrain of the pass, which limits free-wheeling maneuvers. With only 100 counters and relatively few rules, this game has been characterized as "simple, easy to play and requires a short period of time (1-2 hours) to complete."

=== Gameplay ===
The game uses a standard "I Go, You Go" alternating turn system taken from SPI's previous publication The Battle of Borodino, where one player moves and fires, then the other player does the same. This completes one game turn.

Units are not allowed to stack. A unit must stop if it enters an enemy's zone of control, and then must attack the enemy. Most combat results in the loser retreating; the loser is only eliminated if it can't retreat, adding impetus to the opponent to maneuver to surround the unit before combat begins.

== Publication history ==
After the success of SPI's first quadrigame, Blue & Gray, in 1975, the company quickly produced more quadrigames, including Four Battles in North Africa in 1976, consisting of the four games Cauldron, Crusader, Supercharge, and Kasserine. The latter, designed by Jay Nelson, and with graphic design by Redmond A. Simonsen, was also offered for individual sale as a "folio game" — a game packaged in a cardstock folio. It did not crack SPI's Top Ten Bestseller list.

== Reception ==
In the 1977 book The Comprehensive Guide to Board Wargaming, Nick Palmer commented on the narrow tracks that bunched units together, saying, "Movement [is] channeled into the gaps in a maze of rough and broken terrain, helping a difficult US delaying action against a powerful Axis assault." Palmer noted that compared with the other games in the "North Africa" box, Kasserine was "less fluid". Nonetheless, Palmer concluded that the game displayed "tense struggles for key positions."

In the Issue 60 of Fire & Movement, Vance von Borries also noted the lack of space to maneuver, saying, "This game offers more geographic diversity but this tends to channelize combat and some reinforcements may not make sense."
