= Thirty Years War (wargame) =

Board wargame

Thirty Years War, subtitled "Four Battles", is a "quadrigame" — four separate board wargames packaged in one box that use a common set of rules — published by Simulations Publications Inc. (SPI) in 1976. The four games simulate different battles during the Thirty Years' War, and were sold individually as well as in the quadrigame format. Some of the games were well received by critics, but overall, the quadrigame did not sell well.

== Background ==
From 1618 to 1648, a series of religious conflicts broke out in Europe between Protestant states and Catholic states led by Habsburg Austria. Sweden intervened on the Protestant side in the 1630s. Catholic France supported the Protestant side for reasons of realpolitik, eventually joining directly in the war against its rival Habsburg Spain in the final stages of the war. The devastation caused widespread destruction, killing an estimated 4 to 8 million soldiers and civilians, leading to significant depopulation in German states and the end of the Hanseatic League as an economic power.

== Description ==
Thirty Years War is a collection of four two-player wargames that simulate significant battles during this period:

- Lützen (1632): Designed by Brad Hessel. A Swedish-German army confronts an Imperial army
- Nordlingen (1634): Designed by Tom Walczyk. A Swedish-German army attempts to assault a strongly entrenched Imperial-Spanish force
- Rocroi (1643): Designed by Linda Mosca. A French army using line infantry tactics faces Spanish Tercios
- Freiburg (1644): Designed by Stephen B. Patrick. A French army battles a Bavarian-Imperial army. The only game to offer three scenarios, representing the three days of battle.

=== Components ===
The game box includes:

- four 22" x 17" paper hex grid maps scaled at 175 m (191 yd) per hex, one for each game
- four sheets of 100 die-cut counters, one for each game
- rulebook: Rules common to all four games
- four rule sheets: rules unique to each game

=== Gameplay ===
All four games use the same "I Go, You Go" alternating system of turns originally used in SPI's 1971 game, Napoleon at Waterloo:

- The first player moves all units desired, and engages in combat.
- The second player then has the same opportunity.

This completes one game turn, which represents 45 minutes of game time.

However, in a change from the Napoleon at Waterloo rules:

- zones of control are "rigid" but not "sticky": a unit moving adjacent to an enemy unit can continue to move onwards without stopping, but if the unit chooses to stop adjacent to an enemy, combat must ensue.
- artillery can fire and be captured, but cannot be moved.
- Leader counters add their rating to a unit's combat strength and can help rally disrupted units.
- Each game specifies a number of losses that an army must suffer before "demoralization" is reached. If an army is demoralized, it cannot fight, and its movement is increased (simulating headlong retreat).
- A unit that is disrupted as a result of combat cannot fight; the player must roll a die at the start of the next turn to see if the unit can "shake off" the disruption and return to normal. A leader in the same hex will give a bonus to this die roll.

== Publication history ==
After the success of SPI's first quadrigame, Blue & Gray, released in May 1975, the company quickly produced more quadrigames, including Blue & Gray II, Napoleon at War, and Modern Battles.

The March 1976 issue of Strategy & Tactics featured an article by Albert Nofi about the upcoming Thirty Years War quadrigame. Accompanying the article was what Jay Nelson characterized as "the flagship game" of Thirty Years War, a free pull-out gamedesigned by J.A. Nelson about the Battle of Breitenfeld in 1631. Breitenfeld was popular, and two months later, Thirty Years War was released with graphic design by Redmond A. Simonsen. It debuted strongly, moving to #6 in SPI's Top Ten Games list the month it was published. But that initial flush of success was temporary and Thirty Years Wars fell off the Top Ten list only two months later.

Each of the games in Thirty Years War as well as Breitenfeld were offered for individual sale as "folio games" (packaged in a cardstock folio), but none sold well enough to crack SPI's Top Ten list.

Hobby Japan published a Japanese edition of the quadrigame. In 1995, Decision Games acquired the rights to the game and published a second edition, with rules revisions by Joseph Miranda. In that edition, Freiburg, identified by critics as the weakest of the four games, was dropped in favor of White Mountain, a new Thirty Years War game designed by Miranda.

== Reception ==
Bruce Quarrie, writing for Airfix Magazine, said of SPI's quadrigames that "This entire series concentrates on the overall impression of the subject battles at the expense of tactical accuracy. Sometimes this proves irritating to the experienced wargamer but occasionally the system works so well that the most detailed and complex version of the same game would not work any better. This could be said of Thirty Years War." He concluded, "the intelligent use of movement allowances, combat results tables, combat values and the disruption rule combine to give a good simulation of 17th century warfare in a most simple and satisfying style."

In Issue 9 of Fire & Movement, Roy Schelper called the game "one of the more attractively produced quad efforts [by SPI], and the games are ideal vehicles with which to introduce novice players to wargaming." Schelper thought that Lützen and Nordlingen were "superb [...] reasonably balanced and offer challenges to both players." But he felt Rocroi "suffers from the unanswered question of why anyone should attack." And Schelper felt that Freiburg "is not much fun." Nevertheless, he concluded on a positive note, saying, "In a hobby that sometimes seems to be overwhelmed by panzers and esoteric complexities, the Thirty Years War quadrigame is a pleasant, playable alternative."

Writing for The Wargamer, Peter Hatton commented, "The system is effective though it does not distinguish between pike and musket." Hatton concluded, "A workmanlike system whose only challenges in portraying specific battles of the seventeenth century come from English Civil War (Philmar) and Cromwell (SDC)."

In a special edition of Fire & Movement, Joseph Miranda wrote, "Thirty Years Quad demonstrates that a wargame does not have to be complex to be a realistic simulation.... It catches the flavor of 17th century warfare; infantry is ponderous, cavalry a mobile striking force, and artillery definitely a poorer relation on the battlefield."

In his 1977 book The Comprehensive Guide to Board Wargaming, Nick Palmer noted that Thirty Years War "has all the virtues of nearly all the Quads: easy rules, rapid games and lot of combat with little messing about with staff work." Palmer liked the "particularly attractive artillery rules: Guns are almost useless at a distance, but extremely effective in breaking up attacks at point blank range." Palmer characterized the four games as "the excellent Nordlingen and Lützen, the good Rocroi, and the awful Freiburg." He concluded that the game "was "Worth getting despite Freiburg." Palmer also commented on the fifth game of the series, Breitenfeld, calling it a "Good brisk game." In his 1980 sequel, The Best of Board Wargaming , Palmer called Thirty Years War "A quadrigame with one of the few pre-twentieth-century systems to emphasize playability [...] Thirty Years War is quickly learned and plays on oiled wheels."

In Issue 25 of the UK wargaming magazine Phoenix, Chris Bramall commented on the lack of historical accuracy in these games, saying, "the folios hardly merit the title of 'simulations' as any student/historian of the period will realise." But he admitted the point of these small games was to be "supremely playable, dynamic and exciting." Like other reviewers, Bramall found Freiburg to be not nearly as good as the other three games, saying, "it is a siege game and a relatively boring one at that." Bramall concluded, "This quad [...] is one which I have no hesitation in recommending, with the obvious exception of Freiburg. [...] In short, Thirty Years War has no NATO, no nukes and no Nazis but is excellent value all the same for beginner and expert alike."

In the 1980 book The Complete Book of Wargames, game designer Jon Freeman commented "Although Thirty Years' War is more colorful than Musket & Pike, the battles in the quad are, with one exception, mostly blah." Regarding the individual games, Freeman rated Lutzen as "nice", but Freiburg "a disaster." Freeman gave this game an Overall Evaluation of "Fair to Good", concluding, "The system itself is nice and easy and the games play fairly quickly, but there's nothing special here apart from that."

== Other reviews and commentary ==
- Strategy & Tactics #55
- Paper Wars #26
- Strategist #191 & #296
- Moves #98
