= Supercharge: Battle of El Alamein =

1976 WWII board wargame

Cover of folio edition, 1976

Supercharge: Battle of El Alamein, October 1942 is a board wargame published by Simulations Publications Inc. (SPI) in 1976 that simulates Operation Supercharge during the Second Battle of El Alamein of World War II. The game was originally published as part of the Four Battles in North Africa "quadrigame" — a collection of four games simulating four separate battles that all use the same rules. Supercharge was also published as an individual "folio game."

== Background ==
Following the fall of Tobruk to Axis forces in 1942, German General Erwin Rommel's army rolled east towards Egypt with the intention of conquering Egypt and the vital Suez Canal, and possibly driving through to the oil fields of the Middle East. However, lack of fuel and supplies forced Rommel to stop and take a defensive position. Allied forces under British General Bernard Montgomery moved forward to attack the Axis forces before they could receive fresh supplies. Confined to a narrow front by minefields and terrain, the battle became a long and bloody grind.

== Description ==
Supercharge is a game for two players where one player controls the Axis forces, and the other controls the Allied forces. With only 100 counters and relatively few rules, this game has been characterized as "simple, easy to play and requires a short period of time (1-2 hours) to complete."

=== Gameplay ===
The game uses a standard "I Go, You Go" alternating turn system taken from SPI's previous publication The Battle of Borodino, where one player moves and fires, then the other player does the same. This completes one game turn.

Units are not allowed to stack. A unit must stop if it enters an enemy's zone of control, and then must attack the enemy. Most combat results in the loser retreating; the loser is only eliminated if it can't retreat, adding impetus to the opponent to maneuver to surround the unit before combat begins.

== Scenarios ==
The game comes with three scenarios, each simulating a phase of the overall battle:

- Battle of Alam Halfa (8 game turns)
- Battle of El Alamein (15 turns).
- Operation Supercharge (7 turns).

== Publication history ==
After the success of SPI's first quadrigame, Blue & Gray, in 1975, the company quickly produced more quadrigames, including Four Battles in North Africa in 1976, consisting of the four games Cauldron, Crusader, Kasserine, and Supercharge. The latter, designed by Greg Costikyan, Frank Davis and Redmond A. Simonsen, and with graphic design by Simonsen, was also offered for individual sale as a "folio game" — a game packaged in a cardstock folio. It did not crack SPI's Top Ten Bestseller list.

This was Costikyan's first published game design, and he later wrote, "The North Africa quad system was designed for fluid desert battles, and El Alamein, fought on a narrow front, was as much characterized by traffic jams as anything else, given the size of the British force. It didn’t really work. [...] The theory at SPI at the time was that novice designers would be given individual quad games to design. Under the supervision of a coordinator for the Quadrigame as a whole, a designer could be given a first taste of game design without being burdened with too complicated a task. In my case, I must say, the results were disastrous. I was not provided the supervision and help which might have made Supercharge a success. Supercharge was undeniably the worst of the North Africa Quad."

Hobby Japan published the game as a free pull-out in the July 1987 edition of the Japanese language magazine Tactics.

== Reception ==
In the 1977 book The Comprehensive Guide to Board Wargaming, Nick Palmer commented "More open country than the other games in the [North Africa] quad apart from the main German defence line."

In the Issue 60 of Fire & Movement, Vance von Borries felt this game was not up to the standards of the other three games in the North Africa box, saying, "This game fails to overcome a dull subject and suffers from a difficult time in set up, from lack of mobility and from an improper balance of play."
