= Crusader: Battle for Tobruk =

1976 WWII board wargame

Cover of folio edition, 1976, showing a posed British wartime photograph.

Crusader: Battle for Tobruk, November 1941 is a board wargame published by Simulations Publications Inc. (SPI) in 1976 that simulates Operation Crusader during World War II. The game was originally published as part of the Four Battles in North Africa "quadrigame" — a gamebox containing four games simulating four separate battles that all use the same rules. Crusader was also published as an individual "folio game."

== Background ==
Although a successful Allied campaign in North Africa in 1940 resulted in the capture of Tobruk from the Italians in January 1941, Axis forces, now reinforced by the Afrika Korps under German General Erwin Rommel, regrouped in the spring and besieged Tobruk. In November Operation Crusader was the third of three offensives by Allied forces from Egypt, hoping to break the siege. After a confused battle, including a major German counterattack, Rommel broke off, lifting the siege and retreating to El Agheila closer to his supply base.

== Description ==
Crusader is a game for two players where one player controls the Axis forces, and the other controls the British forces. Mechanized units on both sides provide opportunities for maneuvering. With only 100 counters and relatively few rules, this game has been characterized as "simple, easy to play and requires a short period of time (1-2 hours) to complete."

=== Gameplay ===
The game uses a standard "I Go, You Go" alternating turn system taken from SPI's previous publication The Battle of Borodino, where one player moves and fires, then the other player does the same. This completes one game turn.

Units are not allowed to stack. A unit must stop if it enters an enemy's zone of control, and then must attack the enemy. The losing unit is often forced to retreat, and is only eliminated if it is surrounded. This gives impetus to both players to either attempt to maneuver to surround a unit before combat begins or to escape from an impending envelopment.

=== Scenarios ===
The game offers two scenarios, "Sidi Rezegh", and "The Dash to the Wire". These can be linked together to form a campaign game.

=== Victory conditions ===
The Axis player receives victory points for eliminating Allied units and cutting supply lines. The Allied player receives victory points for eliminating Axis units, and for reaching Tobruk.

== Publication history ==
After the success of SPI's first quadrigame, Blue & Gray, in 1975, the company quickly produced more quadrigames, including Four Battles in North Africa in 1976, consisting of the four games Cauldron, Supercharge, Kasserine and Crusader. The latter, designed by Frank Davis, David C. Isby, and Redmond A. Simonsen and with graphic design by Simonsen, was also offered for individual sale as a "folio game" — a game packaged in a cardstock folio. It did not crack SPI's Top Ten Bestseller list.

== Reception ==
In the 1977 book The Comprehensive Guide to Board Wargaming, Nick Palmer approvingly noted the "emphasis on mobile warfare, as the British try to relieve the fortress."

In the Issue 60 of Fire & Movement, Vance von Borries commented "This game is wide open and fluid without a lot of cluttering terrain. It gives a feel for the desert war at a simple level."

In Issue 9 of the British wargaming magazine Phoenix, Ralph Vickers admitted that the game "looked to me like a static siege of Tobruk. I am elated to report that the designers were much more crafty than I expected." Instead of a siege, Vickers discovered a game of fluid motion and tactical problems for both players: "The Axis player must assign the Italians [besieging Tobruk] a backbone of German units that he call ill spare. [...] For the Allies, the best approach is along the coast. But how much strength can they afford to commit there and still contain the panzers in the south? [...] It is a delicate situation for both sides." Vickers concluded, "If all the games and scenarios [in the Four Battles of North Africa box] are typical of this one, then all are first rate."

== Other reviews and commentary ==
- Perfidious Albion #96
