= Wurzburg: Soviet-American Combat in the '70's =

1975 Cold War board wargame

Wurzburg
- Designers: Jim Dunnigan
- Illustrators: Redmond A. Simonsen
- Publishers: SPI
- Publication: 1975
- Genres: Cold War

Wurzburg: Soviet-American Combat in the '70's is a board wargame published by Simulations Publications Inc. (SPI) in 1975 that simulates a hypothetical battle between Soviet and American forces in West Germany. When SPI attempted to market the game in Germany, it caused a backlash, especially in the town of Wurzberg.

== Setting ==
Created at the height of the Cold War, Wurzburg posits an invasion of West Germany in the mid-1970s by Soviet forces, who clash with NATO defenders — in this case, American forces — near the town of Wurzburg.

== Description ==
Wurzburg is a game for two players where one player controls the Soviet forces, and the other controls the American forces. With only 100 counters, short scenarios and relatively few rules, this game is not complex.

=== Gameplay ===
The rules system is taken from SPI's wargame Napoleon at War, which uses an "I Go, You Go" system of alternating turns consisting of three phases:

- Special Weapons Fire (both players)
- First Player Movement and Combat
- Second Player Movement and Combat

This completes one game turn, which represents 12 hours of game time.

In addition, there are rules for rules for artillery, air power, helicopters, river crossings, as well as an option to use nuclear weapons. Units are not allowed to stack. A unit must stop if it enters an enemy's zone of control, and then must attack the enemy. Most units must be kept in supply or their combat and movement is cut in half.

=== Scenarios ===
The game comes with four scenarios that range in length from six to twelve turns. The first three present Soviet incursions into West Germany. The fourth simulates an American counterattack against overextended Soviet forces.

== Publication history ==
Wurzburg was designed by Jim Dunnigan, with graphic design by Redmond A. Simonsen, and was first published as one of four games in SPI's 1977 release Modern Battles: Four Contemporary Conflicts. Wurzburg was also released as a "folio" game packaged in a cardstock folder, and as a "Collector's Edition" with mounted maps in a 2" accordion box.

== Controversy ==
In the mid-1970s, the American wargame publisher SPI enjoyed good sales in the US as well as the UK (through their SP-UK subsidiary). Wanting to enter the European market, SPI introduced Wurzburg as well as some of their other conflict simulations at the 1975 Frankfurt Book Fair. However, several German news outlets, including Der Stern, ran articles pointing out on how Wurzburg used the town — which was heavily damaged during World War II — as the setting for modern military combat that might involve nuclear weapons. Wurzburg's local member of the Bundestag accused SPI of abusing the feelings and memories of the population of Wurzburg, and the mayor of Wurzburg asked the local authorities to investigate a possible case of "glorification and simplification of violence." As Rodger MacGowan noted, "A future war in Europe might prove interesting, entertaining or even 'fun' to a wargamer in the comfort of his living room or den, but to those who live in places like Würzburg, the idea was revolting."

The situation was defused when NATO publicly declared that it was not planning to deploy or use nuclear weapons in the Wurzburg area, and SPI sent a letter of apology to the Wurzburg mayor as well as withdrawing all its games from the German market.

== Reception ==
In a 1976 poll undertaken by SPI to determine the most popular board wargames in North America, Wurzburg placed 80th out of 202 games.

In the 1977 book The Comprehensive Guide to Board Wargaming, Charles Vasey called Wurzburg "a good game with a fierce series of typical battles around the town."

In Issue 20 of the British wargaming magazine Phoenix, George Duguid had several criticisms, the first being the lack of divisions of arms and armor, noting "By failing to distinguish between the various arms of a modern army, the game ignores their relative capabilities and limitations." Duguid also called Wurzburg "a defender's game" that often led to stagnant positions. Finally, Duguid felt the abstract nature of air power was "a technique which leaves much to be desired both visually and playwise."

In Issue 13 of JagdPanther, Howard Anderson pointed out that "The most radically different army in Europe that is still on the NATO side is the West German" and questioned why the only NATO forces used in Wurzburg were American. In the same issue ,John Herlocker found that Wurzburg's rules "fall flat when it comes to nuclear weapons. No attempt is made to differentiate in regard to target and terrain, the range attenuation system is unrealistic; fires and devastation are ignored." Herlocker then went on to suggest several rule changes to fix the problems.
