= The March on India, 1944 =

WWII board wargame published in 1975 by JagdPanther Publications

Cover of JagdPanther #11, containing The March on India, 1944

The March on India, 1944 is a board wargame published by JagdPanther Publications in 1975 that simulates the two-pronged Japanese assault against Indian border towns Kohima and Imphal during World War II.

== Background ==
The Indian border towns of Kohima and Imphal were important supply dumps for the Allies as they fought in Burma. In March 1944, Japanese forces launched a two-pronged assault on both towns, with the ultimate aim of using the supply depots to fuel a major offensive in India. Ultimately the offensive failed, and British/Indian forces counter-attacked, ending Japan's last major ground campaign of the war.

== Description ==
The March on India, 1944 is a 2-player board wargame in which one player controls Japanese forces, and the other player controls British and Indian forces. A large emphasis in the game is keeping units supplied by road, rail or air — unsupplied units have half movement and combat factors, and cannot attack. The game lasts 14 turns.

There are special rules for rail and air transport, engineer battalions, the Indian National Army, artillery units, and British armoured cavalry units to reflect the conditions of the campaign. An extra page of variants suggests adding a Japanese armoured division, horse cavalry units, Kohima and Imphal mini-games, and rules for dropping paratroops.

=== Strategy ===
Critic Charles Vasey suggested "The Japanese hold the strategic initiative, and must endeavour to cut the roads before they run out of supplies. The British have a system of brigade boxes to harry the enemy."

== Publication history ==
The March on India, created by Bob Fowler, appeared as a free pull-out game in Issue 11 of JagdPanther (October 1975). Task Force Games re-released the game as a PDF in 2014.

== Reception ==
In Issue 8 of the British wargaming magazine Perfidious Albion, Geoffrey Barnard commented, "The game would seem to do a good job of re-creating the situation as it would have existed. The special rules, especially the supply rules, as a great deal of colour to the system, which is otherwise fairly basic." Barnard went on to further explore the supply rules, saying, "Both sides have continual supply problems, but it is likely that as one gets acquainted with the game a player will work out which units can be left unsupplied in order to conserve supply for when it is really needed!" Barnard concluded, "A very interesting game, not too complex, and what complexities there are quickly succumb to practice. Well worth playing again."

In the 1977 book The Comprehensive Guide to Board Wargaming, Charles Vasey called March on India a "Complex game ... Accent heavy on supply." Vasey concluded, "Fourteen turns: long, hard and exciting."

In a retrospective review in Simulacrum, Brian Train noted, "The supply rules were innovative for their time in that they did account for the length of a supply line... These supply rules are revolutionary in that they are the first set to account for the cost of transportation of the supplies."

== Other reviews and commentary ==
- Strategy & Tactics #55
