= Modern Battles II: Four Contemporary Conflicts =

Board wargame published in 1977

Modern Battles II: Four Contemporary Conflicts is a collection of four board wargames published by Simulations Publications, Inc. (SPI) in 1977 that simulates three hypothetical contemporary battles as well as the battle for Jerusalem during the Six Day War in 1967. This collection was a sequel to SPI's popular Modern Battles published two years before.

== Description ==
Modern Battles II is a "quadrigame" — a box containing four thematically linked games that use the same rules. The four games are:

- The Battle for Jerusalem 1967: Designed by Mark Herman, this game focuses on the battle for East Jerusalem and the West Bank during the Six Days War.

The other three are hypothetical battles that could result from a situation current in 1977 that could turn "hot":

- Bundeswehr: Combat in West Germany following a hypothetical invasion by Warsaw Pact forces. (Designed by Virginia Mulholland)
- DMZ: The Battle for South Korea: A hypothetical renewal of Korean War hostilities. (Designed by Joseph Balkoski)
- Yugoslavia: The Battles for Zagreb, 1979: The fight for the city of Zagreb during a hypothetical invasion of Yugoslavia by Warsaw Pact forces. (Designed by Phil Kosnett)

=== Gameplay ===
With a small 17" x 22" hex grid map and 200 counters for each game, these games have been characterized as "basically simple". Each turn, which represents 12 hours of game time, consists of five phases:

- Special Weapons Fire (both players)
- First Player Movement
- First Player Combat
- Second Player Movement
- Second Player Combat

The three hypothetical games (Bundeswehr, DMZ, and Yugoslavia) borrow the "untried unit" rule from SPI's Panzergruppe Guderian wargame: Units of each type are shuffled and placed in starting positions upside down so that neither player is aware of their combat strengths. When each unit is engaged in combat for the first time, the unit counter is flipped right side up to display its actual combat strength.

In addition to the common rules used by all four games, each game also has a few unique rules that are germane to its situation: special terrain, specialized units, city combat, command problems, and even nuclear weapons.

== Publication history ==
SPI published their first "quadrigame", Blue and Gray, a set of four American Civil War battles, in 1975. The format proved very popular, and SPI quickly produced more quadrigames, the next being Modern Battles, which also proved to be a popular product.

In 1976, company president Jim Dunnigan decided to release a sequel to Modern Battles and thought it would be a good opportunity to allow people outside the design department to try their hand at game design. These included the company librarian Virginia Mulholland; Joseph Balkoski, who had just joined SPI after earning a master's degree in History; Mark Herman, who had also just graduated with a bachelor's degree in history; and Phil Kosnett, a 15-year-old who was still attending high school while working part-time at SPI. Each of them was assigned one of the four games that would appear in the new boxed set, which was released in 1977 as Modern Battles II with graphic design by Redmond A. Simonsen. The sequel also proved to be popular, rising as high as #4 on SPI's Top Ten Bestseller List.

The four games in the collection were also released as individual games, packaged as "folio games" (games enclosed in a cardstock double LP-type folder.)

== Reception ==
In Craft, Model, and Hobby Industry Magazine, Rick Mataka noted the quality of the components, calling them "professionally produced", and emphasized the contemporary nature of the games, saying, "Each simulation deals with some future conflict that could occur."

In The Guide to Simulations/Games for Education and Training, Martin Campion noted the simplicity of the game rules, except for the artillery rules that "tend to put a larger strain than usual on players' abilities to add numerous numbers in their heads and to consider several alternatives at the same time."

In the 1980 book The Complete Book of Wargames, game designer Jon Freeman commented in the introduction of the book that "a game based on a battle that never took place has two major attractions for nonhistorians. First, you are not playing in the shadow of Napoleon or Rommel. [...] Second, you do not have the original tactics and strategies to fall back on: you must be innovative." Freeman thought these were the reasons that Modern Battles II was so popular, also noting "the element of speculation is quite limited: [...] the data for such potential conflicts are available today."

In Issue 13 of Jagdpanther, John Herlocker noted "The Modern Battles system, while excellent for conventional warfare, falls flat when it comes to nuclear weapons." Herlocker went on to suggest a system for the use of nuclear weapons, including rules for firestorms and fallout.

== Other reviews and commentary ==
- Moves #55
- Fire & Movement #9 & #13
- The Wargamer Vol.1 #13
