= Howard Barasch =

American game designer and author

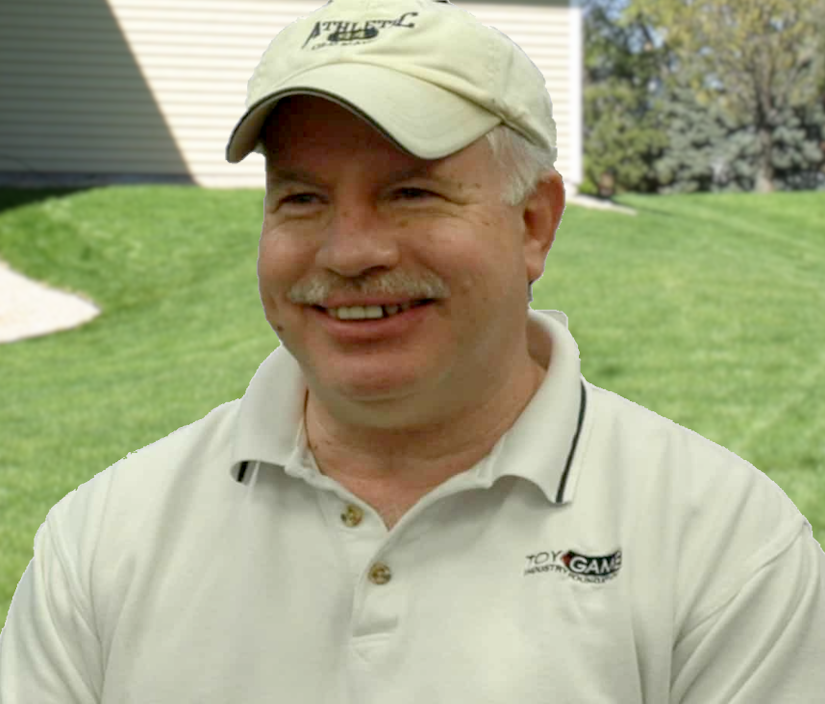
- Born: Brooklyn, New York
- Occupations: Game designer; Game company executive; Author

Howard "Howie" Barasch is a game designer and author who also served as a game company executive and as executive director of the Game Manufacturers Association (GAMA).

== Early life ==
Howard Barasch was born in Brooklyn, New York. After he graduated from Brooklyn Technical High School in 1967, he studied Economics and History at CUNY.

== Wargames ==
=== Simulations Publications Inc. ===
Following graduation, Barasch joined board wargames publisher Simulations Publications Inc. (SPI) in 1973 where he became assistant production manager and inventory manager, as well as the editor of Moves and managing editor of Strategy & Tactics. In the small company, Barasch also had to fill other roles from time to time such as research & development, playtesting, advertising, marketing, sales liaison with retailers, and public relations.

In 1975, SPI published Blue & Gray: Four American Civil War Battles, a box containing four small games simulating four different battles but all using a common set of rules rules. The "quadrigame", as it was called, proved popular, and in order to produce more of them, the company started to ask staff members who did not usually design games to create the games needed. This included Barasch, who was asked to choose one of the games for the upcoming Modern Battles quadrigame; Barasch chose to design Chinese Farm. The following year, he designed two more small games for these four-game sets: Hurtgen Forest for the Westwall: Four Battles to Germany quadrigame; and Cauldron for the Four Battles in North Africa quadrigame.

SPI acquired a license from the Tolkien Estate in 1976 to publish board wargames based on The Lord of the Rings and The Hobbit. Barasch worked with Richard Berg to create War of the Ring. The two hosted a panel at the 4th National Game Convention, and game designer Jon Freeman reported that they "provided a good deal of unintentional amusement when [they] could agree on almost nothing except that the rules needed rewriting." The game subsequently won the Charles S. Roberts Award in the category of "All Time Best Fantasy Board Game of 1977."

By 1977, Barasch had moved up to Vice-President of Operations and Marketing , and filled in for company president Jim Dunnigan when he was out of the office. Barasch noted in an interview, "Most gamers don't realize that the business end is extremely important. Rand Games Associates ran into that problem where John Prados and Albert Nofi and the other people who worked there were all game designers and graphics people and developers and there was no real business end. They were all creative artists and nobody wanted to get his hands dirty... But someone has to devote a good portion of their work time to the business end just to maintain the company's existence."

Howard Barasch (circled) on front cover of Campaign #99, October 1980

In 1978, Barasch started to design a science fiction game titled Freedom in the Galaxy. However, after Barasch had created the game's basic design and backstory, he left the company, and responsibility for finishing the game was given to John Butterfield. When it was released in May 1979, the game proved popular, staying on SPI's Top Ten Bestseller list for six months. But by that time, Barasch had moved to Dallas, Texas to work for Heritage Models.

=== Heritage Models ===
In February 1979, Barasch was lured away from SPI by Heritage Models founder Jim Oden to be in charge of their miniature manufacturing. At Heritage's Dallas retail outlet, The Royal Guardsmen, Barasch noticed that while older gamers were buying traditional packs of military figures to add to their armies, young consumers who were playing the increasingly popular fantasy role-playing game Dungeons & Dragons often shopped for individual miniatures in Heritage's five-year-old "Fantastique" fantasy line. These were rather crude compared to the latest offerings from Ral Partha and Grenadier Miniatures, and Barasch encouraged Heritage to produce a new and more creatively sculpted line aimed at D&D players. These new sculpts were titled the "Dungeon Dweller" line.

At that time, science fiction and fantasy "microgames" were very good sellers for companies such as Metagaming Concepts, and Heritage decided to move into this market. Barasch helped to start up a new microgame division, Dwarfstar Games, overseeing the creation of four new microgames in 1981. Co-worker Arnold Hendrick designed three of them, and Barasch designed the fourth, Outpost Gamma, which received a positive reception. Barasch also designed Goblin the following year, and started up an independent game industry newsletter called The Insider.

However, although both the Dwarfstar line of microgames and the new Dungeon Dweller miniatures were profitable, financial mismanagement by Heritage's president left the company financially vulnerable during the recession and high interest rates of the early 1980s. This led to the company being forced into bankruptcy in 1982. Barasch was promoted to company president to oversee an orderly wind-down of the business, which was finished in January 1983.

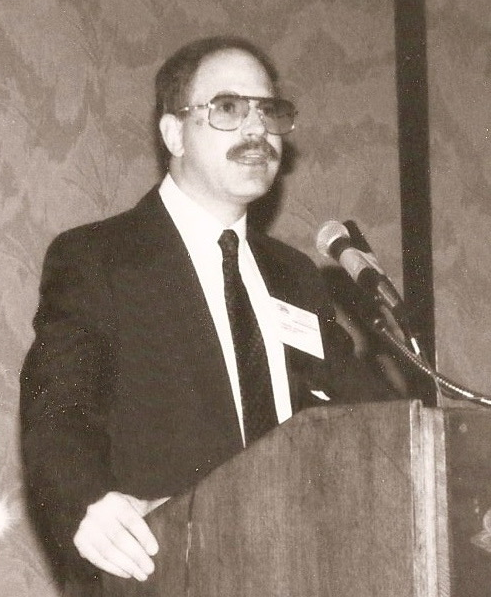
Addressing annual meeting of GAMA as Executive Director in 1985

== Game industry executive ==
Following the demise of Heritage, Barasch started up Softgame Services, which sold computer games to hobby shops. This morphed into Southgame Distributors, a board game distributor.

In 1985, Barasch became the first Executive Director of Game Manufacturers Association (GAMA), an organization dedicated to the advancement of non-electronic social games.

He later joined Calendar Club, which operated 500 seasonal games stores.

== Writer ==
After his retirement, Barasch became a writer, authoring The Cross & The Crescent, a historical novel about the Ottoman Empire's siege of Malta in 1565. The book was published in 2025.

== Personal life ==
Barasch is married, and has three children and eight grandchildren.

== Legacy ==
In a 1982 profile of Heritage Miniatures, John Rankin wrote of Howard Barasch, who had just been promoted to company president, "While not as slick a salesman as his predecessor, Howie is, nevertheless, one of the pros in this business. His 'insider's' knowledge of the industry is legend."
