= Golan (game) =

Cover of "Collector's Edition" box, 1975

Golan subtitled "Syrian-Israeli Combat in the '73 War", is a board wargame published by Simulations Publications, Inc. (SPI) in 1975 that simulates operational level ground combat between Egypt and Israel on the Golan Heights during the just completed Yom Kippur War of October 1973. Golan was originally published as part of the "quadrigame" Modern Battles: Four Contemporary Conflicts.

== Description ==
During the Arab-Israeli War of October 1973, Syrian forces attempted to retake territory on the Golan Heights that had been lost to Israel during the Six-Day War in 1967, but were repulsed. Golan, a simulation of that battle, is one of four games in the series Modern Warfare published by SPI that acts as an introduction to wargaming.

=== Components ===
The folio edition of the game includes:

- folio to hold game components
- 17" x 22" paper hex grid map scaled at 1 mile (1.6 km) per hex
- 100 counters
- rulebook
- player aids
- random number chits

In the "Collector's Edition", the numbered chits were replaced by a six-sided die, and the maps were mounted.

=== Scenarios ===
The game includes three scenarios:

1. The historical scenario: Syria tries to overwhelm Israeli defenses before reinforcements can arrive.
2. A theoretical and not historically accurate scenario that examines what happens if Israeli forces mobilize sooner that actually happened.
3. Another theoretical and not historically accurate scenario that gives the Syrians better command and control and logistics.

Each scenario lasts 30 turns, each of which represents 12 hours.

=== Victory conditions ===
Victory points are awarded for geographical gains and units destroyed. In addition, the Syrian player is awarded victory points for SAM missile hits on Israeli aircraft.

== Publication history ==
SPI published the game Modern Battles: Four Contemporary Conflicts in 1975 using the "quadrigame" concept that SPI had pioneered earlier in the year with Blue & Gray: Four American Civil War Battles: a game that contained a single set of rules, but with counters and maps for four different battles. Similarly the box for Modern Battles contained one set of rules for four different battles, including Chinese Farm, Wurzburg, Mukden, and Golan, the latter designed by Irad B. Hardy, with cartography and graphic design by Redmond A. Simonsen. SPI also released the four games individually as the Modern Warfare series of "folio games", the components contained in a cardstock folder packaged in a plastic bag. Each individual game was also released as a "Collector's Edition" with mounted maps in a 2" accordion box. In a 1976 poll by SPI to determine the most popular wargames in North American, Golan placed an impressive 33rd out of 202 games.

In 1979, Hobby Japan published a licensed Japanese-language version.

== Reception ==
In Issue 24 of Moves (December 1975), Jay Nelson noted that despite being designed as an introduction to wargaming, Golan "is not simple." Nelson felt the game was tilted in favor of the Israeli player, saying, "The general course of a game of Golan will follow the development of the historical event accurately. Large Syrian forces will be repulsed in the early game by their outnumbered Israeli opponents."

In Issue 55 of Moves, Ian Chadwick called it "a good, tough game", but noted that the use of Israeli Air Points versus SAM units instead of simulating actual aircraft sorties "conveys no feel for that part of the battle." He concluded by giving the game an A for playability, a C for component quality, and a C for historical accuracy, saying, "Despite flaws, it's primarily a game and as such lives up to what it sets out to be. As a simulation, it's mediocre, but this can be forgiven due to the ease and enjoyment of play."

In the 1977 book The Comprehensive Guide to Board Wargaming, game critic Charles Vasey thought the game was "Rather unbalanced to the Israelis."

In a retrospective review in Warning Order #19, Matt Irsik recalled that "The first several turns are pretty nerve-wracking for the Israeli player." He concluded that it was "a good game that only goes wrong during the end game [...] if the Israelis held on at the beginning they go on a killing spree at the end which isn't much fun for the Syrian player!"

== Other reviews ==
- Close Up: SPI's Chinese Farm and Golan, by Warren G. Williams, Fire & Movement #2, 1976
- Spotlight: Games of the Arab Israeli Wars, by Keith Poulter, Wargamer Vol.1 #2, 1977
- SPI's Modern Battles, by Donald Mack, in Wargamer Vol.1 #13, date needed
- American Wargamer Vol.3, No.7
- Simulacrum #20
- Paper Wars #62

== Sources ==
- Elusive Victory: The Arab-Israeli Wars, 1947-1974, by Trevor N. Dupuy, Harper and Row, New York, 1978
- Arabs at War: Military Effectiveness 1948-1991, by Kenneth M. Pollack, University of Nebraska Press, Lincoln, Nebraska, 2002
- The Yom Kippur War 1973: The Golan Heights, by Simon Dunstan, Osprey Publishing, New York, 2003
