= Mukden: Sino-Soviet Combat in the '70s =

Board wargame

Cover of folio edition, 1975

Mukden: Sino-Soviet Combat in the '70s is a board wargame published by Simulations Publications Inc. (SPI) in 1975 that simulates a contemporary hypothetical battle between Soviet and Chinese forces near the city of Mukden. It was one of four games that were part of the "quadrigame" (four games with a single set of rules) titled Modern Battles: Four Contemporary Conflicts, but it was also released as an individual game. In a 1976 poll, Mukden was the least popular of the four games in Modern Battles.

== Background ==
The city of Mukden (now Shenyang) is a major sub-provincial city and the provincial capital of Liaoning province in northeast China. Due to its concentration of industry and its importance as a transportation center, it became the center of conflict both during the 1905 Russo-Japanese War and during the 1947 Chinese Civil War. The game Mukden theorizes that in the 1970s, the city would still be an important strategic goal in a hypothetical war with the Soviet Union.

== Description ==
Mukden is a two-player wargame in which one player controls Soviet forces, and the other controls the Chinese. It is a simple and easy-to-learn game, with only 100 counters, two rules sheets, and a relatively small 17" x 22" paper hex grid map.

=== Gameplay ===
Each turn, which represents 12 hours of game time, consists of three phases:

- Special Weapons Fire (both players)
- First Player Movement and Combat
- Second Player Movement and Combat

Most units must be kept in supply or their combat and movement is cut in half. This is more of a problem for the Soviets: as they advance, their extended supply lines become vulnerable to Chinese attack.

=== Scenarios ===
The game includes three scenarios:

- "Battle for Asia": A Soviet invasion pierces the Chinese border and advances on Mukden. The Chinese then counterattack.
- "The Siege of Mukden": House-to-house fighting, likened to the Battle of Stalingrad.
- "Guerilla!": Chinese partisans make hit-and-run attacks against the Soviets.

== Publication history ==
After the success of SPI's first quadrigame, Blue & Gray: Four American Civil War Battles, published in May 1975, the company quickly produced several more quadrigames over the next six months, the next being Modern Battles. It proved very popular, moving to #3 in SPI's Top Ten Games list the month it was published.

Mukden, designed by David Isby, was one of the four games in the Modern Battles box, but was also offered for sale as an individual "folio game" (packaged in a cardstock folio) with graphic design by Redmond A. Simonsen.

== Reception ==
In a 1976 poll conducted by SPI to determine the most popular board wargames in North America, Mukden was the least popular of the four Modern Battles games, rated 54th out of 202 games.

In the 1977 book The Comprehensive Guide to Board Wargaming, Charles Vasey thought the game's lack of popularity was "perhaps because of its obscure location in a hypothetical war."

In The Guide to Simulations/Games for Education and Training, Martin Campion commented, "The game rules are basically simple but the artillery rules tend to put a larger strain than usual on players' abilities to add numerous numbers in the heads and to consider several alternatives at the same time."

In Issue 24 of Moves, Phil Kosnett called the first two scenarios "pure blitzkrieg", but found the third scenario unbalanced in favor of the Chinese. Kosnett thought that all three scenarios "show both sides' weak and strong points; the differences between a small, powerful force and a huge army of rather weak cannon fodder."

== Other reviews and commentary ==
- The Wargamer Vol.1 #7 & Vol.1 #13
- JagdPanther #10 & #13
- The American Wargamer Vol.3 #7
- Simulacrum #20
