= Freedom in the Galaxy =

Science fiction board game published in 1979

Cover of the original SPI edition, 1979

Freedom in the Galaxy, subtitled "The Star Rebellions, 5764 AD", is a space opera board game published by Simulations Publications, Inc. (SPI) in 1979.

== Description ==
Freedom in the Galaxy is a two-player game where, similar to Star Wars, rebels seek to overthrow a tyrannical Galactic Empire by winning the support from the populations of nearby planets, raising armies and eventually defeating Imperial navies and armies. One player controls the rebellion, and the other player seeks to quell the rebellion.

The game has both a short version and a complex campaign version. Combat is done on both a grand scale, with armies and starfleets engaged against each other, and at an individual level.

=== Components ===
The game box comes with:

- 22" x 34" displaying a central portion of a galactic empire consisting of 30 star systems
- 140 cards
- 400 counters
- 32-page rulebook
- Galactic Guide
- playing aids

=== Gameplay ===
The game is divided into three sections:

1. The Star System Game
2. The Province Game
3. The Galactic Game

In each game, each player has the following phases Rebels first, and then Imperial player):

- Operations
  - Movement
  - Enemy Reaction
  - Military Combat
- Search
- Mission
  - Assignment
  - Action
  - Bonus Draw

=== Victory conditions ===
The Rebel player gains victory points for gaining and holding planets, and loses victory points for losing planets or having Rebel planets destroyed by the Imperium. If the Rebel player ends the game with more than 25 victory points, then the Rebel player wins. If the Rebel player ends the game with less than 26 victory points, then the Imperial player wins.

== Publication history ==
Inspired by 1977's movie Star Wars, SPI created the thematically similar Freedom in the Galaxy, a board game designed by Howard Barasch and John H. Butterfield, with graphic design by Redmond A. Simonsen and cover art by David Wenzel. The first version was printed in 1979 with the stars printed in pink (the "pink map" version.) This was quickly changed to the "black map" version, where the stars were printed in blue. The "black map" version also introduced two minor printing errors. Freedom in the Galaxy proved popular, and stayed on SPI's Top Ten Bestseller List for six months after its publication.

In 1982, TSR unexpectedly took over SPI, and in an effort to quickly recoup some of their money, TSR repackaged several of SPI's popular games as TSR games. One of these was Freedom in the Galaxy, which was a simple rebranding of the "black map" edition. TSR did not update the rules, and this edition contains the two minor errors that had been introduced in the "black map" version.

A computer adaptation by MicroProse was announced in 1997, but the project was apparently canceled by 1999.

== Reception ==
In Issue 43 of the British wargaming magazine Perfidious Albion, Nicky Palmer liked the game, commenting, "Near-perfect rules, interesting problems, entertaining jokes ...The best SF game I have played since Godsfire, though Dune runs close."

In the inaugural edition of Ares Magazine, Eric Goldberg gave this game a good rating of 7 out of 9, saying, ""the amount of care that went into the game and the smooth flow of play make Freedom a very good game. It is certainly the most professional development effort in science fiction and fantasy this past year."

In the June 1980 edition of edition of Dragon, (Issue 38), Tony Watson liked the extremely complex rules for the campaign game, saying, "The campaign game is really what the game is all about: letting players manage the opposite sides of a galaxy-wide rebellion, rather than vying over more or less isolated situations as presented in the star system and province games." Watson highly recommended the game: "Played in its galactic game version, Freedome in the Galaxy is an impressive game... The scope is there, the action is present, and most importantly, the game has the color and flavor of the situation it portrays. The game glitters with chrome but refuses to be weighted down by all the extras. Underneath the baroque facade of space opera, there remains a solid, playable and quite intriguing game."

In the September 1980 edition of The Space Gamer (Issue No. 31), Steve Winter found the rules to be intricate and complex, but thought the investment in time to learn the game was worth it. "FITG is not for people who like simple games – it is long and complex – but it's a good investment in terms of fun dollars spent, and a must for anyone with [...] a handful of Star Wars ticket stubs in their jeans."

In Issue 26 of Phoenix, Terry Devereux thought that "On the whole, Freedom in the Galaxy will tie up two players in an interesting, worthwhile and involved game. One of the many exciting games that the serious science-fiction gamer can ill afford to have missing from his vast collection."

In Issue 79 of the UK magazine Games & Puzzles, Nick Palmer called this "One of the best and most successful of the non-tactical SF games." After a lengthy analysis of the game, and some proposed strategies for both players, Palmer concluded by giving the game an Excitement rating of 4 out of 5, saying, "An intricate, compelling and eminently re-playable game."

In a retrospective review in Issue 9 of Simulacrum, David Chancellor commented, "this game was a blatant attempt by SPI to cash in on the Star Wars craze that had ignited two years earlier. Hard-pressed but sincere and lovable Rebels struggling against an evil, monolithic Empire across the vastness of a star-filled galaxy — how could it miss?" Chancellor pointed out that, unlike SPI's War of the Ring, which had substantially increased in collectible value in the 25 years since its publication, Freedom in the Galaxy was not highly prized by collectors. Chancellor theorized, "Perhaps if SPI had shelled out the cash for the Star Wars license back in 1979, things would be different now. (Most collectors would probably gladly pay for a chance to play as Luke Skywalker or Darth Vader, much as they do for a chance to play Frodo or Gandalf. Who the hell wants to pay to play Adam Starlight or Drakir Grebb?)"

== Other reviews and commentary ==
- Moves #51
- Campaign #95
- Gryphon #3
- Heroes Vol. 4, #1
- The Boardgamer Vol. 7, #1
- Casus Belli #10 (Sep 1982)
- Games & Puzzles #77
