= Hurtgen Forest (wargame) =

Board wargame

Hurtgen Forest, subtitled "Approach to the Roer, November 1944 ", is a board wargame published by Simulations Publications Inc. (SPI) in 1976 that simulates the Battle of Hürtgen Forest during the final year of World War II. The game was originally published by SPI as part of a four-game collection (a "quadrigame") titled Westwall: Four Battles to Germany, but it was also released as an individual "folio game." While the quadrigame Westwall received good reviews from critics, the static nature of Hurtgen Forest was less well received.

== Background ==
In September 1944, American forces launched an offensive in the Huertgen forest near the German border. The Germans put up a dogged defense from their well-prepared Westwall (called the Siegfried Line by the Allies), and succeeded in stalling several major attacks by American attacks. The battle lasted from early September 1944 until the start of the German surprise offensive in late December 1944 now known as the Battle of the Bulge.

== Description ==
Hurtgen Forest is a two-player game in which one player controls American attackers, and the other controls German defenders. The game is relatively simple, with only 100 counters, a small map and straightforward rules.

=== Gameplay ===
A common set of rules was created for all four games in the Westwall gamebox, a revision of the games system developed for the previously published quadrigame Modern Battles. Each turn, which represents 12 hours of game time, consists of five phases:

- Both players: Special Weapons Fire
- American Movement
- American Combat
- German Movement
- German Combat

In addition to the quadrigame rules, Hurtgen Forest also has some rules developed specifically for its scenario.

== Publication history ==
In 1975, SPI published their first "quadrigame", Blue and Gray, a set of four American Civil War battles. The format proved very popular, and SPI quickly produced more quadrigames, one of them being Westwall, published in 1976 that included Hurtgen Forest, a game designed by Kip Allen, Howard Barasch and Redmond A. Simonsen. Westwall initially sold well, rising to #6 on SPI's Top Ten Bestselling Games list after its release, and staying in the Top Ten for six months.

All four Westwall games, including Hurtgen Forest, were also released individually, packaged as "folio games" (games enclosed in a cardstock folio.)

== Reception ==
In the 1977 book The Comprehensive Guide to Board Wargaming, Charles Vasey reviewed Hurtgen Forest and called it "Rather boring."

In The Best of Board Wargaming, Nick Palmer called Hurtgen Forest "A drab game with acres and acres of rough terrain and only a few feasible avenues of approach." Palmer gave it a very poor Excitement Grade of only 20%.

In Issue 6 of the UK wargaming magazine Phoenix, Jeff Parker noted that Hurtgen Forest accurately portrayed the tenacious German defense, saying, "Given two competent players the game will faithfully recreate the creeping progress of the Americans, but it is rather like playing a game of chess with nothing but pawns."

In the October 1976 issue of Airfix Magazine, the only compliment Bruce Quarrie had for the static battle in Hurtgen Forest was that the game was "Fairly balanced."
