= Arnhem (wargame) =

Board wargame

Cover of "Collector's Edition" boxed set, 1976

Arnhem, subtitled "Operation Market-Garden, September 1944" and also published as A Bridge Too Far: Arnhem, is a board wargame published by Simulations Publications Inc. (SPI) in 1976 that simulates Operation Market Garden during World War II, when Allied forces attempted to create a salient in the Netherlands, using paratroopers to take strategic bridges over the Rhine. Arnhem was originally published in the WestWall "quadrigame" (four different games using the same set of rules), but was also packaged for sale as an individual game.

== Background ==
In an attempt to quickly gain an invasion route into the industrial Ruhr region in northern Germany, Allied paratroopers landed at Arnhem, Eindhoven and Nijmegen in the Netherlands, far behind enemy lines, in order to seize key bridges over the Rhine. Allied ground forces then attempted to force their way through German defenses to link up with the besieged paratroopers.

== Description ==
Arnhem is a two-player wargame in which one player controls the Allied forces trying to take and hold bridges over the Rhine, and the other player controls the German defenders.

=== Components ===
The game includes:

- a 22" x 17" paper hex grid map scaled at 1 km (5/8 mi) per hex
- 100 die-cut counters
- rulebook of rules common to all four Westwall games
- rulesheet with rules unique to Arnhem

=== Gameplay ===
Arnhem, like the other three games in Westwall, uses a simple alternating "I Go, You Go" series of turns: First the Allied player moves and fires, then the German player moves and fires. This completes one turn, which represents one day of game time. The game lasts for ten turns.

There are special rules for bridge demolition, bridge repair, and river crossings, and an optional rule for randomly determining weather conditions on each turn.

=== Scenarios ===
The game includes two scenarios:

- the historical scenario, in which military units and reinforcements are placed on the board in the places and at the times that happened during the actual battle
- the "free deployment" scenario, in which players have considerably more leeway in the placement of units and reinforcements.

=== Victory conditions ===
Victory Points are awarded to both players for enemy units eliminated, and additionally for the Allies, for geographical objectives achieved. The player with the most Victory Points at the end of Turn 10 is the winner.

Cover art of "A Bridge Too Far" edition, 1977

== Publication history ==
After the success of SPI's first quadrigame, Blue & Gray, in May 1975, the company quickly produced several more quadrigames. One of those, published in 1976, was Westwall, which included the four games Arnhem, Bastogne, Hurtgen Forest, and Remagen. Several critics called Arnhem, designed by Jay Nelson, the best game of the four.

Arnhem was released as a separate game in several forms, including in a ziplock bag game, as a "folio" game (packaged in a shrinkwrapped cardstock folio), and as a boxed "Collector's Edition". Simpubs UK repackaged the game in a new box for the British market.

The following year, United Artists released A Bridge Too Far, a film about Operation Market Garden. SPI immediately acquired the board game rights, and re-released Arnhem as A Bridge Too Far: Arnhem. The new box art featured stills from the film.

After the demise of SPI, Decision Games acquired the game rights and published a new edition in 2010 titled Arnhem: The Farthest Bridge.

== Reception ==
In the 1977 book The Comprehensive Guide to Board Wargaming, Charles Vasey called Arnhem "a multi-faceted game with paratroops playing the key role, with the Allies trying to link up and the Germans harrying their flanks."

In his 1980 book The Best of Board Wargaming, Nick Palmer called Arnhem "a masterpiece. If you can only own one game, this should be it." Palmer lauded its lack of complexity, commenting "Not only is the game simple, but it is also extremely elegant: it really matters how and where you retreat or advance." He also noted that "many of the strategic decisions must be made by the Germans, who are ostensibly the defenders [...] But the Allies too have important decisions to make." Palmer concluded by giving this game an excellent "Excitement grade" of 100%, saying, "It is suitable for beginners, and also for experts."

In Issue 6 of the UK wargaming magazine Phoenix, Jeff Parker called Arnhem "superb", saying that he found himself so emotionally invested in the game that "I found myself willing the little cardboard counters to cross the last few inches of road on the coloured map to the relief of the battered paratroopers in Arnhem."

In Issue 27 of Phoenix, Donald Mack called Arnhem "A game which is rightly popular because of the good simulation of Operation Market Garden it presents without resorting to complexity to do so." Mack found the supply rules, although simple, had a profound influence on the game. He concluded that it was "a game system so simple that it is now being used as an introductory game for beginners."

David S. Palter, writing for Jagdpanther, called Arnhem "a fast-moving, fairly simple game." However, Palter felt the game was too simple for more experienced players, and suggested adding complexity with three major rule changes "that will not drastically effect the outcome of the game, though they will have a significant effect on the way that outcome is reached."

In Issue 15 of Battlefield, James Frediant felt that the Line of Communication rule as it applied to airborne units needed "some restructuring" to correct what Frediant felt was an oversimplification that unbalanced the game in favor of the Allied player.

In a retrospective review in Warning Order, Matt Irsik recalled Arnhem was "One of the best games that came out of [quadrigames]." He summarized the game in simple terms: "The road leading to Arnhem is just too long and there simply aren't enough troops to secure it and prevent the Germans from cutting the road in several places." He concluded by calling it "A good, quick game about Operation Market Garden."

== Other reviews and commentary ==
- Fire & Movement #19
- The Wargamer Vol.1 #10
