= Bastogne: The Desperate Defense, December 1944 =

Board wargame published in 1975

Bastogne: The Desperate Defense, December 1944 is a board wargame published by Simulations Publications, Inc. (SPI) in 1976 that simulates the German attack on Bastogne during World War II's Battle of the Bulge. The game was originally part of the four-game collection Westwall: Four Battles to Germany, and was also released as a stand-alone "folio" game.

== Background ==
In December 1944, German forces staged a surprise offensive through the Ardennes, taking the Allies by surprise, since intelligence had not predicted any kind of winter offensive. Part of the German attack surrounded American forces at Bastogne, and tried to force a surrender, which would have opened up vital roads and railways to the northwest. A task force led by General George Patton attempted to break the siege.

== Description ==
Bastogne is a two-player wargame where one player controls the Allied forces and the other player controls the Germans. With a small map and only 100 counters, the game has been characterized as "simple".

The game has two scenarios, the siege of the town by German forces, and the relief of the town by an Allied task force.

=== Gameplay ===
The game system, adapted from SPI's 1972 game Napoleon at War, uses an alternating "I Go, You Go" series of turns, where one player moves and attacks, followed by the other player. Each turn represents 12 hours of game time.

== Publication history ==
In 1975, SPI published Blue & Gray, its first quadrigame — four different battles using the same set of rules, packaged into one box. The concept proved popular, and SPI quickly published several more quadrigames, including Westwall in 1976. One of the four games included was Bastogne, designed by Larry Pinsky, with graphic design by Redmond A. Simonsen. Bastogne was also released as an individual game packaged in a double LP-sized cardstock folio.

(This game is not to be confused with another SPI game of the same title, published when the company was known as Poultron Press, designed by Jim Dunnigan and published in 1969 in Issue 20 of Strategy & Tactics. The two games are not related in form or content.)

In 2011, Six Angles acquired the rights to Bastogne and the other games of Westwall, and reissued the entire set with a new box and new graphic design.

== Reception ==
In the 1980 book The Best of Board Wargaming, Marcus Watney called this "an interesting game, for unlike other Battle of the Bulge games, it deals only with the fighting in the immediate vicinity of the town of Bastogne itself." Watney found the game interesting and exciting, but noted that one particular American defense strategy guarantees an American victory, and made a suggestion as to how to prevent that. Despite this problem, Watney concluded by giving the game an excellent Excitement grade of 90%

In Issue 8 of The Wargamer, Chris Hunt said, "The game is quick to understand, easy to play, and quickly over, but this is all one wants from a 'folio' [game]." In a later issue, Jeff Petraska commented, "Like most of the quadgames, Bastogne was designed to be easy to play."

In Issue 20 of Simulacrum, Dav Vandenbroucke noted that there were few comparable games, saying, "The Battle of the Bulge is one of the 'big three' subjects of wargaming (the other two being Waterloo and Gettysburg), and there are many games on the Ardennes campaign. However, most of these, including the earlier Poultron Press game entitled Bastogne, cover large parts of the campaign, not just the fighting around Bastogne. There are a few games on a comparable scale."

== Other reviews ==
- Fire & Movement #65
- International Wargamer Vol.3 #11
