= The Battle of Borodino: Napoleon in Russia 1812 =

Cover of Strategy & Tactics No. 32, which contained The Battle of Borodino as a pull-out game

The Battle of Borodino: Napoleon in Russia 1812 is a board wargame published by Simulations Publications Inc. (SPI) in 1972 that is a simulation of the Battle of Borodino during the French invasion of Russia in 1812.

== Background ==
In June 1812, Napoleon invaded Russia and forced Russian forces to retreat. By September, French forces had advanced to the outskirts of Moscow, where the Russians made a stand, setting up a strong defensive position near the small village of Borodino. After a fierce battle with heavy losses on both sides, the Russians made an orderly retreat, opening the road to Moscow and providing Napoleon with a Pyrrhic victory. Although the French briefly occupied Moscow, the oncoming winter and lack of supplies forced the French to immediately withdraw from Russia, with the loss of a significant portion of the French army to disease, cold and starvation.

== Description ==
The Battle of Borodino is a 2-player wargame that uses the same rules system as SPI's popular Napoleon at Waterloo game published the year before. Turns are "I go, You Go", where one player moves their pieces and engages in combat, and then the other player gets the same opportunity.

=== Components ===
The game includes:

- 22" x 34" paper hex grid map scaled at 400 yd (365 m) per hex
- 100 die-cut counters
- rulesheet

=== Movement ===
Each unit can move up to the limit of its movement rate. Units cannot enter a forest except via roads, and cannot cross rivers except via a bridge or specified ford. (Using a ford costs two extra points of movement.) Units can cross a stream at the cost of one extra point of movement. French units cannot enter the front of a Russian redoubt or fleche.

=== Combat ===
Units adjacent to enemy units must attack, unless separated by a river. Artillery can fire upon non-adjacent units that are one hex away. To simulate the strong defensive works thrown up by the Russians, Russian unit strength is doubled when a French attack is directed through the front of a redoubt or fleche. Likewise, a unit's defensive strength is doubled when in a town or a forest. Attacks cannot be made across a river except at bridges and fords, where the attacker's strength is halved.

=== Scenarios ===
The game comes with four different scenarios: September 5, September 6, September 7, and Grand Battle, which is a combination of the first three scenarios.

=== Victory conditions ===
- September 5: Whoever owns the Schevardino redoubt at the end of the scenario is the winner.
- September 6: Whoever owns three redoubts at the end of the scenario is the winner.
- September 7 scenario and the Grand Battle game: Several objectives are used to determine who the winner is, and how great a victory was achieved:
  - A minimal victory for either side is simple control of all the redoubt hexes
  - A substantial victory is achieved by inflicting more casualties on the enemy than casualties suffered;
  - French decisive victory is achieved if the French player can move 60 combat factors off the eastern edge of the map before the end of the scenario;
  - Russian decisive victory: the Russian player must control all redoubt hexes and inflict more casualties than the French.

== Publication history ==
In 1971, SPI offered the small and simple wargame Napoleon at Waterloo as a free bonus that came with a subscription to their house magazine Strategy & Tactics. The following year, John Young designed a Napoleonic game based on the rules used in Napoleon at Waterloo. The result was The Battle of Borodino, published as a pull-out game in Strategy & Tactics No. 32 (May 1972) with graphic design by Redmond A. Simonsen. SPI subsequently released it as a boxed set, first in a plain white box with a red title ribbon, and then in a "flat pack" box.

It proved to be a popular game; in a 1976 poll conducted by SPI to determine the most popular board wargames in North America, Borodino placed 23rd out of 202 games, despite being four years old.

== Reception ==
Writing in Moves only a few months after Borodino was published, Martin Campion noted, "So far the two sides seem well-balanced, but the French have to be very careful on the first day as they come on the board in driblets that can be overwhelmed in detail if they don't treat the Russians with respect." Writing in The Guide to Simulations/Games for Education and Training almost a decade later, Campion called this "a simple game but it can be a lengthy one." He concluded, "The mechanics are not very reliable but the game looks very authentic and the problems of the game are analogous to the problems of the actual battle."

In his 1977 book The Comprehensive Guide to Board Wargaming, Nicholas Palmer called this a "Very simple and fast-moving game, based on the introductory Napoleon at Waterloo, yet durably popular with the hard-core."

Although Roy Gibson called Borodino "One of my favorite SPI games, played more frequently than any other single game", he did note several problems, and in the first two issues of Phoenix, wrote extensive outlines of how the game could be improved:

- More historically accurate use of bridges
- Better cavalry charges and extended artillery ranges

In the 1980 book The Complete Book of Wargames, game designer Jon Freeman called this "a very simple game based on a very complex battle." He found the first-day scenario favored the French, while the other scenarios favored the Russians. Noting that the game was 8 years old at the time of his writing, Freeman concluded, "Although the game is a far cry from the current state of the art, its challenges and the simple system used make it an entertaining and fast-moving game for novice and veteran gamers alike."

== Other reviews and commentary ==
- Fire & Movement No. 24
- The Wargamer Vol.1 No. 13
- Outposts No. 4
- Jagdpanther Vol.1 No. 7
- Battle Flag Vol.1 No. 25
