= JagdPanther (magazine) =

Defunct wargame magazine 1973-1976

Cover of Issue #1, April 1973

Cover of final issue (#15, titled Battlefield), Oct. 1976

JagdPanther is a game magazine that was published from 1973 to 1976.

== Publication history ==
In 1973, Texas Tech student Stephen V. Cole started playing PanzerBlitz, a tactical-level World War II wargame published by Avalon Hill. Cole grew so enamored of the game that he conceived of a series of variants and expansions that he called "PanzerBlitz Unlimited". In order to provide a forum for this, he founded the company JagdPanther Publications to produce the fanzine JagdPanther, dedicated to PanzerBlitz and other World War II wargames. The quarterly publication featured complete small games in every issue and also provided scenarios as well as variants for existing games.

The first issue, published in April 1973, contained the first article on PanzerBlitz Unlimited, an article on World War II mechanized combat, a variant for the wargame Borodino, and two reviews of commercial wargames, as well as several original mini-games — the squad-level WWII game MP44, a football game called Scrimmage IV, and a simulation of the Battle of Cowpens.

By 1975, JagdPanther had evolved from a hand-typed zine to a professional magazine that contained a well-produced game such as The March on India, 1944 in each issue. JagdPanther won the first of two Charles S. Roberts Awards at the Origins Awards. By that time, the focus of the magazine had moved away from World War II wargames, and to reflect this, Cole changed the title of Issue #15 (October 1976) to Battlefield. Cole had graduated from Texas Tech the previous year, and found he was becoming more interested in building a game company than publishing a magazine. Following the release of the re-titled Issue #15, he ceased publication of the magazine. Shortly afterwards, Cole joined with Allen Eldridge to found Task Force Games.

== Reception ==
In the February 1976 edition of The Strategic Review (Issue #6), Gary Gygax called this zine "a veritable goldmine of information on boardgames. Each issue contains dozens of items: variants, reviews, suggested rule changes, etc." Gygax favourably compared the small zine to the professional glossy magazines Wargamers Digest and Panzerfaust, and on a scale of "Major Tragedy" to "Major Triumph", rated it a Major Triumph.

When the name of the magazine was changed from JagdPanther to Battlefield, the British critic Charles Vasey commented, "There is nothing that stands out over the old [Jagdpanthers], except that it is the culmination of an improvement from the old amateurish days in most presentation and content."

== Reviews ==
- Perfidious Albion #4 (p5)

== Awards ==
At the 1976 Origins Awards, JagdPanther won the Charles S. Roberts Award for Best Amateur Magazine of 1975.

The following year, JagdPanther/Battlefield was again the winner of the Charles S. Roberts Award for Best Amateur Magazine.
