= Napoleon at Waterloo =

1984 video game

- Publisher(s): Krentek Software
- Platform(s): Atari 8-bit, Commodore 64
- Release: 1984
- Genre(s): Turn-based strategy

Napoleon at Waterloo is a 1984 computer wargame published by Krentek Software.

== Gameplay ==
Napoleon at Waterloo is a game in which the player controls Napoleon while the computer commands the forces of Wellington at the Battle of Waterloo.

== Reception ==
Mark Bausman reviewed the game for Computer Gaming World, and stated that "The mechanics are easy to master and the game responds quickly to the joystick."
