= Modern Battles: Four Contemporary Conflicts =

1975 Cold War board wargame

Modern Battles: Four Contemporary Conflicts is a collection of four board wargames published by Simulations Publications Inc. (SPI) in 1975 that simulates four modern-day battles set in the early 1970s.

== Description ==
Modern Battles is a "quadrigame" — a game box that contains four separate wargames that use a common set of rules. Two of the games are based on battles during the Yom Kippur War that had occurred less than two years before publication of the game:

- Chinese Farm: The cross-canal Battle of The Chinese Farm
- Golan: Syria's attempt to retake the Golan Heights

The other two games are based on hypothetical scenarios:

- Mukden: A Soviet incursion into Manchuria centers on the strategic Chinese city of Mukden
- Wurzburg: A hypothetical invasion of West Germany by Warsaw Pact forces.

=== Components ===
The game box contains:

- four 17" x 22" paper hex grid maps, one for each game, scaled at 1 mi (1.6 km) per hex
- 400 double-sided die-cut counters (100 per game)
- two rulebooks describing the rules common to all four games
- four rulebooks (one for each game) describing the rules unique to each game
- various charts and players' aids
- a small six-sided die

The individual games released as "folio games" packaged in a ziplock bag did not include the six-sided die.

=== Gameplay ===
Each turn, which represents 12 hours of game time, consists of five phases:

- Special Weapons Fire (both players)
- First Player Movement
- First Player Combat
- Second Player Movement
- Second Player Combat

Each game also has some rules only used in that game, e.g. Wurzburg had a few special rules for helicopters, river crossings, and nuclear weapons.

== Publication history ==
In 1975, SPI published their first "quadrigame", Blue and Gray, a set of four American Civil War battles. The format proved very popular, and SPI quickly produced more quadrigames, the first being Modern Battles. It consisted of Chinese Farm, designed by Howard Barasch; Golan, designed by Irad B. Hardy; Mukden, designed by David Isby; and Wurzburg, designed by Jim Dunnigan. The graphic design for all four games was created by Redmond A. Simonsen. Modern Battles initially sold well, rising to #3 on SPI's Top Ten Bestselling Games list after its release, and staying in the Top Ten for four months.

The four games were also released as individual games, packaged as "folio games" (games enclosed in a cardstock folder within a ziplock bag.) None of the individual games sold well enough to crack SPI's Top Ten list.

In 1977, SPI released a sequel, the quadrigame Modern Battles II, that included battles set in the Six Day War, Yugoslavia, West Germany and South Korea.

== Reception ==
In a 1976 poll conducted by SPI to determine the most popular board wargames in North America, Modern Battles placed 33rd out of 202 games. Two of the individual folio games were rated higher than this, Chinese Farm coming in 15th, and Wurzburg 23rd. Golan was 33rd, while Mukden was the least popular, placing 54th.

In Issue 15 of Fire & Movement, Rodger MacGowan related that shortly after Wurzburg was released, SPI began to distribute their wargames in Western Europe, including West Germany. However, after the German magazine Der Stern ran an article on how Wurzburg used the town as the setting for military combat that might involve nuclear weapons, there was a local outcry by Wurzburg residents. The German distributors quickly took it and other modern-era games set in West Germany off the market. As MacGowan noted, "A future war in Europe might prove interesting, entertaining or even 'fun' to a wargamer in the comfort of his living room or den, but to those who live in places like Würzburg, the idea was revolting."

In the 1977 book The Comprehensive Guide to Board Wargaming, Charles Vasey thought that the Combat Results Table (CRT) was "very complex for a [quadrigame with] numerous bloodless retreats." Vasey also complimented the "fine maps", and described Wurzburg as "a good game with a fierce series of typical battles around the town."

In Issue 20 of the British wargaming magazine Phoenix, George Duguid criticized Modern Battles for "failing to distinguish between the various arms of the modern army (with the exception of artillery)." Duguid also noted that the games, especially Wurzburg, often stagnated into a defensive battle of attrition. He also didn't like the abstract concept of air strikes, wishing that there actual physical units representing aircraft. He went on to suggest changes to the rules to correct these deficiencies.

In an article in Moves reviewing wargames by various publishers set in the Arab-Israeli Wars, Ian Chadwick examined both Golan and Chinese Farm. He noted that the simplistic game mechanics "makes these games fast and enjoyable, but realism is sacrificed." He also did not like the abstract nature of air strikes and air defenses. He found Golan to be "a good, tough game, one easily played to a conclusion in one evening." He called Chinese Farm "a very playable game. It's not as fluid as Golan, but nonetheless fast and enjoyable." He graded both games "A" for playability, "C" for component quality and "C" for historical accuracy.

In The Guide to Simulations/Games for Education and Training, Martin Campion thought that "The game rules are basically simple but the artillery rules tend to put a larger strain than usual on players' abilities to add numerous numbers in their heads and to consider several alternatives at the same time."

In a retrospective review in Issue 20 of Simulacrum, Dav Vandenbroucke, Art Kritzer & Brian Train, commented, "Modern Battles departed from the standard scripting of the quads inasmuch as two of the games involved hypothetical battles, and the games were not homogenous and related to each of the others. In another sense as well, it was unusual. Of the many reviews published of this quad in the hobby magazines of the era, only one dealt with the quad as a whole, and most dealt with Wurzburg in a uniformly positive light while Mukden was clearly the least popular of the four."

== Other reviews and commentary ==
- Fire & Movement #2
- Jagdpanther #10 & 13
- Strategy & Tactics #55
- The American Wargamer Vol.1 #2 & Vol.1 #13
- The Wargamer Vol.1 #7 & Vol.3 #8
