= Stonewall: The Battle of Kernstown =

Board game

Cover of boxed set, 1978

Stonewall: The Battle of Kernstown is a board wargame published in 1978 by Simulations Publications (SPI) that simulates the First Battle of Kernstown during the American Civil War.

== Background ==
In March 1862, Confederate General Stonewall Jackson was sent into the Shenandoah Valley to tie down the Union forces in the Valley. Jackson received incorrect intelligence about the size of Union forces near Kernstown, and on 23 March 1862 attacked what he thought was a small Union detachment, but was in fact an entire infantry division under the command of Col. Nathan Kimball, a force more than twice the size of Jackson's.

== Description ==
Stonewall is a 2-player board wargame in which one player controls Confederate forces and the other player controls Union forces. The game uses a system similar to SPI's previously published Terrible Swift Sword, including Combat Effectiveness that tracks a unit's morale and fatigue. Each turn represents 20 minutes of the battle, and each hex is scaled to 125 yd (115 m).

Rules cover leaders, ammunition, artillery accuracy, melee, and gun crews.

=== Strategy ===
Critic Steve List recommended that the Union forces "must create a cohesive front to prevent the Confederates from slipping around them, but they cannot afford to be badly beaten in the process. The Confederate player must in turn avoid heavy casualties and either escape from the map or seize several key objectives."

== Publication history ==
In 1976, SPI published the award-winning Terrible Swift Sword, an American Civil War wargame designed by Richard Berg. The rules system was adapted by several games, including Stonewall, designed by Mark Herman with graphic design by Redmond A. Simonsen. The game appeared in 1978 as a free pull-out in Issue 67 of SPI's house magazine Strategy & Tactics. It was also sold as a boxed set. Although Terrible Swift Sword at that point was still in SPI's Top Ten Best Selling Games list two years after its publication, Stonewall did not enjoy the same success, and did not crack the Top Ten.

== Reception ==
In Issue 54 of Moves, Steve List gave this game a grade of "B", saying "All in all, this is a much more playable game than [Terrible Swift Sword], but given the small forces in use, it is a bit frustrating because it requires the players to substitute maneuver for mass in a system that makes maneuver difficult."

In the 1980 book The Complete Book of Wargames, game designer Jon Freeman commented "The effective complexity is not so great as it might appear; the flow of play is so natural that you rarely refer to the rules." Freeman concluded by giving this game an Overall Evaluation of "Very Good", saying, "While too complex for the novice, this is an excellent game for introducing the 'journey-man' gamer to musket-era tactical games, and it's a good evening's fun."

In The Guide to Simulations/Games for Education and Training, Richard Rydzel admitted the game was complex but insisted the rules were completely digested after a couple of turns. Ryzdel commented, "The new concepts are easy to learn. It is these new concepts that make this an historical and playable game that seems to accurately depict the tactics used during this period." Ryzdel concluded, "This is a very good game to fit into American history classes."

== Awards ==
- At the 1978 Origins Awards, Stonewall was a finalist for a Charles S. Roberts Award in the category "Best Pre-Twentieth Century Game".

== Other reviews and commentary ==
- Fire & Movement #85
- The Wargamer, Vol1, #8
- Line of Departure #35
- Pursue & Destroy #18
