= Mark Herman (game designer) =

American Game Designer

- Born: 1954; Brooklyn, New York, United States
- Occupation: Game designer
- Notable work: We the People, For the People, Empire of the Sun, Churchill

Mark Herman (born 1954) is an American game designer known for his contributions to wargames and historical strategy games. With a career spanning more than five decades, Herman is regarded as a pioneer in the genre, particularly for his innovations in card-driven games (CDGs), which blend narrative and strategy through card-based mechanics.

== Early life and education ==
Herman was born in Brooklyn, New York in 1954, the first child of businessman Nathaniel Herman and homemaker Joan Herman. He began playing wargames at age 12, and immediately started to think about creating his own games.

Herman graduated from Stony Brook University in 1976 with a bachelor's degree in history.

== Wargame designer ==
After graduation, Herman joined Simulations Publications Inc. (SPI) , and apprenticed as a game designer under Jim Dunnigan and Redmond A. Simonsen. He was given two assignments: design a small and simple game to simulate the Lebanese Civil War that had begun the previous year, and be the game developer for October War, a wargame about the Yom Kippur War. The shifting alliances of the Lebanese Civil War proved to be too complex for a small game, and Herman was retasked with creating a small and simple game about Israel's attempt to take East Jerusalem and the West Bank away from Jordan during the Six Day War. This game, titled The Battle for Jerusalem 1967, was published in 1977 as one of four games in the collection Modern Battles II. The October War was also published in 1977 in Issue 61 of SPI's house magazine Strategy & Tactics.

Herman designed several more games for SPI in 1977, including Raid! and Red Sun Rising. He then left the company for a short time but returned in 1978 and immediately returned to game design, creating Stonewall: The Battle of Kernstown (1978); The Next War (1978); Mech War 2 (1979); John Carter: Warlord of Mars (1979); Tyre (1980, part of the "quadrigame" The Art of Siege); and Across Suez (1980).

In 1981, Herman started work on a game titled Conan the Barbarian, a licensed tie-in to the movie that was scheduled to be released in 1982, and a pre-publication play test kit was released.

However by that time, SPI had run into serious debt. In early 1982, it borrowed enough money from the role-playing game publisher TSR to pay off its creditors, putting up the company assets as collateral. As soon as SPI had paid off its creditors, TSR called the loan. SPI, having no funds left, was forced out of business and TSR took ownership of its assets. TSR immediately halted all current SPI game development, including Conan the Barbarian.

Most SPI game designers, including Herman, resigned. Eric Dott, owner of rival Avalon Hill, immediately set up a new subsidiary called Victory Games where the ex-SPI game developers could work for him. Herman moved to Victory Games and served as Executive Vice President of publishing as well as a game designer. During his time at Victory Games, he designed popular titles such as Gulf Strike. Staff members at the United States Central Command headquarters at MacDill Air Force Base purchased a copy of Gulf Strike and played it at the base.

During this time, Herman also worked on a game about the Pacific Front of World War II and would read a book each day to immerse himself in that subject, and would use math to do probability calculations for the rival forces, and was also able to get the codebreaking capabilities of the American and British forces integrated into a game he was working on. This was eventually published by Victory Games in 1985 as Pacific War: The Struggle Against Japan 1941-1945.

In 1987, Herman left Victory Games and became an independent game designer, publishing his games through Monarch Avalon and GMT Games. During this period, he created some of his most popular games, including Fire in the Lake, The Great Battles of Alexander, Washington’s War, Empire of the Sun, and Churchill. Herman also created three games to be used by Pentagon planners for officer training on contingencies for combat.

Herman worked with General William E. DePuy on games at BDM International for the United States Department of Defense. Ellis Simpson of Games International described Herman in 1988 as "one of the gurus of modern gaming" for whom "the more controversial the topic, the greater his interest". Herman designed a second edition of Gulf Strike that was published in 1988, as well as the 1990 Desert Shield expansion module for the game. Herman continued to work as a defense and military analyst in the early 1990s, and designed the simulation that the Pentagon used for Operation Desert Storm.

In 1991, Herman was inducted into the Charles S. Roberts Hall of Fame.

== Card-driven wargames ==
In 1993, Herman designed a wargame about the American Revolutionary War that used cards to drive the action. The result was We the People, a historical wargame published by Avalon Hill in 1993 that pioneered the card-driven mechanic and began a shift with strategic games including ways of incorporating politics into the designs. A sequel based on the American Civil War, For the People, won a Charles S. Roberts Award.

== Continued design work ==
Herman earned a master's degree in National Security Studies from Georgetown University in 1997. He was an adjunct professor teaching military strategy and analytic methods for Georgetown University (1998-2009) and Columbia University (2014-2019), and lectured for the U.S. Naval War College, and the University of Maryland.

In the 2000s, Herman was a senior partner and worked on game design at the management consulting firm Booz Allen Hamilton, working with the United States military.

Herman designed the game Empire of the Sun (2005) for GMT Games, and Churchill (2015, GMT Games).

== Author ==
Herman wrote Wargames According to Mark: An Historian's View on Wargame Design, which was published by GMT Games in 2024.

== Awards ==
- 1991 Inducted into Charles S. Roberts Hall of Fame Award
- 1998: For the People won a Charles S. Roberts Award in the category Best Pre-World War II Boardgame
- 1998 James F. Dunnigan Award for Playability and Design at Origins '99
- 2005: Empire of the Sun: The Pacific War 1941-1945 (with Stephen Newberg) won a Charles S. Roberts Award for Best World War II Boardgame

== Selected works ==
- Gulf Strike (1983)
- Pacific War (1985)
- France 1944: The Allied Crusade in Europe (1986)
- The Peloponnesian War (1991)
- SPQR (with Richard Berg) (1992)
- We the People (1994)
- For the People (1998)
- Empire of the Sun (2005)
- Washington’s War (2010)
- Fire in the Lake (2014) - co-designed with Volko Ruhnke
- Churchill (2015)
