= The Siege of Constantinople (game) =

1978 board wargame

Strategy & Tactics #66, which contained The Siege of Constantinople as a pull-out game

The Siege of Constantinople, subtitled "The End of the Middles Ages 1453 A.D.", is a board wargame published by Simulations Publications Inc. (SPI) in 1978 that simulates the land combat during the Fall of Constantinople in 1453 CE. It was published as a promotional precursor to SPI's four-game collection The Art of Siege, but was received so poorly that one critic speculated it may have actually convinced players not to buy The Art of Siege.

== Background ==
In 1453 CE, the Ottoman army of Sultan Mehmed II (later nicknamed "Mehmed the Conqueror") laid siege to Constantinople, defended by the forces of Emperor Constantine XI Palaiologos. The city fell after a 51-day siege, marking the end of the last vestiges of the Roman Empire, as well as the end of the Medieval period.

== Description ==
The Siege of Constantinople is a two-player board wargame where one player controls the Ottoman forces, and the other the defenders of the city. With a small 17" x 22" hex grid map, and only 200 counters, this game resembles SPI's previously published and relatively simple quadrigames in size and components, but the addition of many new rules made it "one of the most complex of the 'small' simulations of recent years."

=== Gameplay ===
The rules are based on the system developed for Napoleon at Waterloo published by SPI in 1971, but include many new rules for bombardments, tunnelling, simultaneous fire, engineering, and wall repair, all set within a new and complex sequence of play.

The game comes with two scenarios:

1. The second half of the siege, when most of the action occurs.
2. The entire siege.

== Publication history ==
In 1975, SPI published the "quadrigame" Blue & Gray: Four American Civil War Battles, which contained four relatively simple games that used one common set of rules. The concept proved popular, and SPI produced many more quadrigames over the next four years.

In 1978, SPI was preparing to publish a new quadrigame, The Art of Siege. In preparation for the game's release, Richard Berg was commissioned to design a promotional precursor simulating the siege of Constantinople. However, as critic Jon Freeman noted, "When the design and development fell well behind schedule, the naval module, which was to re-create the Turkish assaults on the harbor, was discarded to speed the game towards its deadline. More problems arose, further changes were made, and the focus of the game went in and out like a zoom lens. In the end, it was published in Strategy & Tactics #66 to resounding disappointment."

The game was not well received, and rather than being a positive promotion for The Art of Siege, may have had the opposite effect. Canadian critics Luc Olivier and David Chancellor noted, "It did not achieve critical acclaim, and may have turned potential buyers away from The Art of Siege."

A year after its publication, British critic Rob Gibson speculated that the game's poor sales were due to the complex rules, writing, "[I have] initially attempted to play it three times, each time getting bogged down in the sequence of play. [...] I suspect many gamers rejected this simulation because it was not easily playable."

The Siege of Constantinople was also released as a boxed set. The naval module that had been dropped from production was later published in Issue 37 of Moves.

== Reception ==
Players and critics were uniformly unimpressed with The Siege of Constantinople. In a players' poll conducted by Fire & Movement to determine the worst game of the year, Constantinople placed third.

In Issue 29 of the British wargaming magazine Perfidious Albion, several critics discussed this game at length. Doug Ryder liked the game as it was published, but noted, "It's a pity SPI decided to do away with the naval side of the game." Roger Sandell disagreed, commenting, "What a disappointment ... Too much die rolling. The bombardment and repair seem to go on for a very long time and when the assault finally starts the missile fire phase takes up a lot of time. A little thought could easily have cured this." Sandell also noted the absence of the naval rules and pointed out "much of the map serves no purpose, merely showing the large area of sea where nothing happens."

In the 1980 book The Complete Book of Wargames, game designer Jon Freeman commented, "This is one of the most disappointing games of recent memory." Freeman felt that little strategy was involved, saying, "The game proceeds as a die-roller until the Ottomans breach the wall. Then things get interesting for a couple of turns, and the Ottomans win. Or they don't breach the wall, and the Ottomans lose. That's it. It would be quicker to flip a coin." Freeman gave this game an Overall Evaluation of "Poor".

In Issue 11 of Fire & Movement, David Minch pointed out, "The only relevant, or necessary hexes are in a corridor, no more than ten hexes wide, running along the course of the wall. The rest of the map serves no useful purpose." Minch concluded, "There was some thought given to this design, but not enough. It is neither abstract enough to be workably interesting, nor realistic enough to be tactically satisfying." Several issues later, Peter Manti wrote that he had found this game largely unplayable, and had therefore assumed that the games in The Art of Siege would be similarly weak. However, he was surprised by the four games' playability. He compared Constantinople to one of the games from that box, saying "Tyre is a game of the Art of Siege Quad heralded in S&T by a 'fifth wheel', Constantinople. Those whose expectations may have been negatively colored by having played the latter game are in for a pleasant surprise. [Unlike Constantinople,] Tyre is an integrated land and sea conflict of sustained excitement."

In The Guide to Simulations/Games for Education and Training, Martin Campion noted that "The map shows the whole city, but the game is played almost entirely in the outer all area (one-third of the map at most.)" He concluded, "The game plays well in details but it is probably too difficult for the Turks, who will have a hard time pulling off a historical result."

== Other reviews and commentary ==
- Spartan Simulation Gaming Journal #12
