= Acre: Richard Lionheart's Siege =

Board wargame published in 1978

Acre: Richard Lionheart's Siege is a board wargame published by Simulations Publications, Inc. (SPI) in 1978 that simulates the Siege of Acre in 1191. The game was originally part of the four-game collection The Art of Siege, and was also released as a stand-alone "folio" game.

== Background ==
In 1187, the Christian army of King Guy of Jerusalem was defeated by the forces of Saladin at the Battle of Hattin, giving control of Jerusalem to Saladin. Pope Gregory VIII issued a papal bull named Audita tremendi that proposed the Third Crusade to recapture Jerusalem. In 1189, with a new army, Guy of Jerusalem besieged the port of Acre, which was believed to be the key to conquering nearby Jerusalem. Saladin brought an army to surround and attack the besiegers, but was unable to break the siege. This double encirclement, with Christians besieging Acre but defending themselves against Saladin's forces, continued for two years, until the arrival of reinforcements and better siege engines brought by Richard I of England of England and Philippe II of France of France. Although Saladin tried to intervene again, he failed to break the siege, and a month after Richard and Phillipe arrived, the city of Acre surrendered.

== Description ==
Acre is a two-player wargame where one player controls the Crusaders, and the other player controls the Egyptians. With a small map and only 200 counters, the game has been characterized as "simple".

=== Gameplay ===
The game system, adapted from SPI's 1972 game Napoleon at War, uses an alternating "I Go, You Go" series of turns, where one player moves and attacks, followed by the other player.

Each game turn represents two days and is broken down into a number of phases, including Planning; Bombardment and Repair; and Assault, Regrouping, and Repair. There are rules for catapults, tunnelling, repairing walls, ladder assaults, and leaders.

If at the end of any Assault phase, ten Crusader units plus one leader occupy hexes within Acre, or if Saladin is killed, then the Crusaders win. If at the end of any Assault phase, Muslim units occupy 12 Crusader camps, or if both Richard I and Philippe II have been killed, or if the Crusaders fail to win by Game Turn 16, then the Muslims win. (If both sides claim victory at the end of an Assault phase, then the game ends in a draw.)

== Publication history ==
In 1975, SPI published Blue & Gray, its first quadrigame — four different battles using the same set of rules, packaged into one box. The concept proved popular, and SPI published an entire series of quadrigames, including The Art of Siege in 1978. One of the four games included was Acre, designed by Phil Kosnett, with graphic design by Redmond A. Simonsen. Acre was also released as an individual game.

Critic Jon Freeman noted that Acre's game system "was largely inspired" by the previously published SPI game The Siege of Constantinople.

== Reception ==
In the 1980 book The Complete Book of Wargames, game designer Jon Freeman commented, "Although Acre is based upon The Siege of Constantinople, it is, despite their similarities, not so big a bore as the latter. Since the constant tunneling and bombardment produce no immediate effect, siege warfare is not exactly a thrill a minute. [...] Thanks to the presence of Saladin's army as a constant threat to the besieging Crusaders, Acre has a great deal more action as well as a good bit more color than its parent." Freeman gave this game an Overall Evaluation of "Good", concluding, "Acre is probably the most playable of the four [games in Art of Siege]."

In Issue 36 of the British wargaming magazine Phoenix, William Hamblin found several inaccuracies in the historical reconstruction, from weapons and armor to tactics and the names of various types of units. But he admitted, "On the whole, the game is enjoyable to play and offers a number of interesting challenges to players on both sides." Nevertheless, he concluded, "In a sense, the historical inaccuracies make it so that the game is not really an historical simulation of the siege of Acre, but rather a 'fantasy' game wearing an historical mask."

In Issue 48 of Moves, Pete Bartlam commented "My first impression of Acre was of a cleaned-up Constantinople. On later examination, it turned out to be a cleaned-up Constantinople! However, it does have the important 'Alesia factor', for we have not only the siege but the besiegers besieged." However, Bartlam thought the opening phase of Acre dragged on, and felt the final assault didn't feel right, saying, "It should be much more dangerous up against the walls, making it necessary to employ a lot of arrow-fodder, with units who successfully breach the defenses having much more effect [...] One doesn't get the feeling of desperate men clawing their way to the parapets, rung by rung, through a hail of arrows." He concluded the game was "an enjoyable, playable game, a good simulation of a siege, with one or two caveats, but a minus for medieval flavor."

== Other reviews ==
- Fire & Movement #65
- The Wargamer Vol.1 #17
- International Wargamer Vol.3 #11
