= Port Arthur =

Port Arthur may refer to:

== Places ==
=== Australia ===
- Port Arthur, Tasmania, the site of a historic convict settlement
- Port Arthur, South Australia, a locality

=== Canada ===
- Port Arthur, Ontario, a former city, now a part of Thunder Bay
  - Port Arthur (federal electoral district)

=== China ===
- Port Arthur, China, now called Lüshunkou District, in the city of Dalian

=== Finland ===
- VIII District, Turku, a district in Turku

=== United States ===
- Port Arthur, Texas, a city in the United States
- Port Arthur, Wisconsin, an unincorporated community

== Events ==
- Port Arthur massacre (China) in the Sino-Japanese War in 1894
- Battle of Port Arthur, a sea battle in the Russo-Japanese War in 1904
  - Siege of Port Arthur, a land battle in 1904 during the Russo-Japanese War
- Port Arthur Case, a fabricated political case carried out in Mongolia between 1947 and 1949
- Port Arthur massacre, which occurred in Port Arthur, Tasmania in 1996

== Movies ==
- Port Arthur (film), a 1936 drama film directed by Nicolas Farkas

== Games ==
- Port Arthur (wargame), a 1977 board wargame that simulates the 1904 Siege of Port Arthur
