= The Battles of Waterloo (game) =

Napoleonic wargame

- Cover art by Rodger B. MacGowan
- Designers: Richard Berg
- Illustrators: Rodger B. MacGowan; Mark Simonitch
- Publishers: GMT Games
- Publication: 1994
- Genres: Napoleonic

The Battles of Waterloo, subtitled "June 16–18, 1815", is a Napoleonic wargame published by GMT Games in 1994 that simulates the four final battles of Napoleon Bonaparte's life: Quatre Bras, Ligny, Wavre, and Mt. St. Jean (better known as Waterloo).

== Background ==
In what became known as the Hundred Days, Napoleon Bonaparte escaped from captivity on Elba and arrived back in Paris to a tumultuous welcome. But the other states of Europe, the Seventh Coalition, rushed to mobilize their armies against him, hoping to join in northern France. Napoleon, knowing he had to defeat his enemies piecemeal before they could merge into an unstoppable force, rushed into Belgium to attack the Prussians first, then deal with the British. Four battles in two days decided the fate of Europe.

== Description ==
The Battles of Waterloo is a Napoleonic wargame for 2 players in which one player controls French forces while the other player controls forces of the Seventh Coalition.

=== Components ===
- Maps: The game comes with three double-sided 22" x 34" hex grid map sheets scaled at 210 yards (190 m) per hex. The fronts of the maps are used for the July 16 battles — one map for Quatre Bras and two sheets for Ligny — and the backs are used for the July 18 battles — one sheet for Waterloo and two sheets for Wavre.
- 480 double-sided counters
- 32-page rule book
- 16-page scenario book
- various player aids
- 10-sided die

=== Scenarios ===
Each of the four battles can be run as a separate scenario. The June 16 battles can be combined into one scenario, as can the two June 18 scenarios.

=== Gameplay ===
As critic John Burtt noted, "the key to Loo is the command rules." Each commander in the army has a "Leader Initiative Marker" (LIM). At the start of each turn, a player selects from available LIMs. These are then drawn randomly during the operations phase of the turn. A commander can only take action if its LIM is drawn, but only a few LIMs are drawn each turn, leaving many commanders inactive. For example, in the Waterloo scenario, the Seventh Coalition player can select LIMs from six different commanders, but only two will be drawn during the turn, leaving four inactive. There are several optional rules including cavalry pursuit, cavalry impetuosity, and Napoleon's health.

=== Sequence ===
Each turn takes the following form:

1. Initiative to determine which players goes first.
2. Pool Creation: Both players choose their LIMs for the turn.
3. Operations: The player who won initiative draws and activates one of their LIMs randomly. Then the second player draws an LIM and moves. Play alternates until there are no LIMs left.
4. No LIM: Commands that were not chosen to be part of the LIM pool can attempt to take an action.
5. Out of Command: Units that were out of range may attempt to return at reduced speed.
6. Corps Morale Phase
7. Leader Replacement

=== Strategy ===
Because of the LIM-based structure, planning for every eventuality is necessary. As critic Marc Brandsma noted, "It is absolutely impossible to change your mind every two turns or to rush units from one end of the map to the other in search of a breakthrough opportunity. The key to victory, therefore, lies in a battle plan that is well-conceived, well-prepared, and well-executed. Easier said than done."

== Publication history ==
The Battles of Waterloo was designed by Richard Berg, and was published by GMT Games in 1994 with cover art by Rodger B. MacGowan and interior art by Mark Simonitch.

== Reception ==
In Issue 16 of Berg's Review of Games, John Burtt called the counters "stunning. The brigade sized combat units contain a color picture of the unit type (a charging cavalryman, infantryman, or a cannon) on top of a national flag." Burtt also admired the LIM system, writing, "This mechanic is OUTSTANDING." Burtt also liked the movement rules. However, Burtt questioned the definition of a corps being "shattered", pointing out that if nine out of ten units that comprise the French II Corps were eliminated, the Corps would not be considered to be "shattered" if the one remaining unit was not routed, reduced or eliminated. Burtt also gave individual assessments for each of the battles:

- Quatre Bras: "A good 'little' game to start with.
- Wavre: "This one-map gem pits the French III Corps against the Prussian III Corps in a slugfest for Wavre and Dyle river crossings."
- Ligny: "a big, fun undertaking, as command is pretty simple. Two maps, lots of Prussians, lots of slugging."
- Mt. St. Jean: "takes a long time to play because players are constantly trying to work out what to do next. There are a LOT of options for both sides."

Burtt concluded, "Loo is not for everyone ... You can't sit down and play this one right out of the box, but, once learned, the nuances and options available to players make it a rich experience. Overall: A historian's delight. Gamers may learn something as well."

In Issue 85 of the French games magazine Casus Belli, Marc Brandsma commented, "Of the four engagements, only Ligny and Waterloo are truly interesting. Ney's ridiculous activation rules at Quatre-Bras and the lack of stakes at Wavre rule the other two out." Despite this, Brandsma concluded, "It is undeniable that Richard Berg conducted extensive research to offer a fresh approach to Napoleonic battles, one that focuses on command and planning."

Writing for The General, John Setear admired the cover art by Rodger B. MacGowan, saying, "You could practically frame the front box art, with its gorgeous red-to-yellow background and its triptych of Napoleonic icons." Commenting on the counters, Setear thought, "Taken as a whole, the game portrays the involved units not merely in the clear sunshine of a clear mid-morning, but in that light as brilliantly reflected off neat arrays of polished bayonets and cuirassiers." Setear concluded, "Both outside and in, this is a game in which graphic choices contribute to an image of Napoleonic struggle as gleaming spectacle. The box art is bold, the counters dazzling, and the map subordinated to the spectacle of the counters."

In Issue 89 of the British wargaming magazine Perfidious Albion, Charles Vasey commented, "The Battles of Waterloo has the advantages of a semi-chaotic system which is transparent and runs in a rich vein of gaming tradition. Its counters are overbright and its maps an attractive style." However, Vasey found "The historicity is poor in considering alternative events ... In simulating the battles as they occurred the detailed historicity is a game try but is let down for the fan in a number of key areas." Vasey concluded, "A good game for the traditionalist gamer with a passing interest in Waterloo, for him the game's disadvantages are minimised (if they even exist) and he will enjoy the colour. The historically driven gamer will not probably find it satisfying. The gamer who likes to get on with things is not going to enjoy it much."

In Issue 2 of Zone of Control, Dave Mignerey liked the maps, noting, "There are six levels of terrain that nicely capture the rolling hills near Quatre Bras and the wooded ground of Wavre. Famed crests and slopes, utilized most effectively by both sides, are as prominent here as in history." Mignerey also liked the LIM system, writing, "the GMT model is more 'real world' to the extent that battles do not conform to a standard sequence of play." However, Mignerey did warn, "the combat system can hamstring and frustrate the aggressive player." Despite this, Mignerey concluded, "Richard Berg has crafted a system of Napoleonic battle well-suited to the tastes of this armchair historian. And, although they might require a few years' exile on Elba to play out, The Battles of Waterloo are packed with enough flavor and fun to make time pass quickly like hours on vacation."

== Awards ==
At the 1994 Origins Awards, The Battles of Waterloo won two Charles S. Roberts Awards:

- Best Wargaming Graphics
- Best Pre-World War II Board Game
