= John Carter: Warlord of Mars (board game) =

1979 board game

- Cover art by Don Maitz
- Designers: Eric Goldberg (game designer); Mark Herman
- Illustrators: Don Maitz; Redmond Simonsen
- Publishers: SPI
- Publication: 1979

John Carter: Warlord of Mars is a two-player board game published by Simulations Publications, Inc. (SPI) in 1979 that is based on the Barsoom novels of Edgar Rice Burroughs featuring the hero John Carter.

== Description ==
Edgar Rice Burroughs began to write Barsoom stories starring the transplanted Earthman John Carter in 1911, and the setting became one of his most popular over the next three decades. The board game John Carter is based on the works of Burroughs, and is divided into three separate games in a partially modular format.

=== Components ===
The game components are:

- 400 die-cut cardboard counters
- a game map
- two 8-page player's booklets
- 28-page rulebook
- 16-page sourcebook titled The World of Barsoom.
- game box

=== Gameplay ===
The overall game is subdivided into three smaller games:

- Duelling Game: one on one combat with monsters and villains
- Strategic Game, often involving the rescue of a woman who has been kidnapped by a villain
- Military Game, for fleet-sized combat

== Publication history ==
John Carter was designed by Eric Goldberg and Mark Herman, with graphic design by Redmond A. Simonsen and artwork by Don Maitz. It was released by SPI in 1979, and was on SPI's Top Ten list for four months.

== Reception ==
In Issue 94 of Campaign, Dave Okada commented, "While SPI has been guilty, in some cases, of turning out 'cookie-cutter' game systems, this is not the case with John Carter. They chose a new, and I might add successful, path ... It is a fun, exciting, and unique game."

In the inaugural edition of Ares (March 1980), David Ritchie rated the game an above average 8 out of 9, commenting, "Like Burroughs' original heroes, their cardboard counterparts must win only by fair means. To win by engaging in foul acts – which, among other things, loses the love and respect of your lady – means that, in game terms, you've lost the whole enchilada. For the first time in the history of the hobby, a game has been built around such themes as love, romance, treachery, remorse, hatred and friendship."

In Issue 25 of Phoenix (May–June 1980), John and Deidre Evans were impressed by the "stunning" cover art, and also found the counters and map colorful. However, they found several problems in each of three games, thought the rules were poorly organized, and several rules were ambiguous. Nonetheless, they rated the game highly, concluding "If you think you'd like swashbuckling excitement and you're prepared to bear with the rules layout, we think you'd enjoy John Carter, Warlord of Mars: play it for fun."

In the October 1980 edition of Dragon (Issue 42), Tony Watson thought it was "an interesting game, and remarkably true to its sources." However, Watson had issues with the frequent duels, which he found "a bit repetitious" and "less than exciting" due to the simplicity of the combat rules. He also pointed out the imbalance of the game, saying, "The chance for a villain to win is infinitesimal; the question is not if a hero will win, but when." But he concluded that there was a market for the game: "Players who are interested in the game as a way of participating in the adventures on Barsoom will be able to overlook these points and fully enjoy the game."

In the 1980 book The Complete Book of Wargames, game designer Jon Freeman warned that "there is little interaction between players, and the luck factor is quite high." Freeman did admit that "it's quite suited to solitaire play, and the flavor of the whole thing is very authentic Burroughs: the hero must overcome a seemingly endless series of adverse events only to have the villain slip away again and again.". Freeman concluded by giving an Overall Evaluation of "Good", saying, "If the Burroughs style of improbable adventures pleases your palate, you'll eat this one up."

In a retrospective review in Issue 14 of Simulacrum, Joe Scoleri called this "An interesting hybrid game system — the odd, chart-heavy mechanics seem to have more in common with role-playing games while the physical execution of the game is clearly wargame-based." Scoleri noted that fans of the Barsoom novels seemed to be the target audience, pointing out, "The fun factor for Burroughs fans is indeed high, as demonstrated by random event cards such as: Villain Attempts to Besmirch Fair Princess’ Honor, Secret Curtain Opens and Princess Disappears, Slug Turnkey and Escape, Mad Scientist Saves Hero Then Uses Him For Experiment, etc." Scoleri concluded that this game probably was not for 21st-century gamers, saying, "Today's gamers are likely to be turned off by the maze of charts which make John Carter look like something that should be run on a computer."

An entry from The Encyclopedia of Scientific Fiction praised the game's story and theme, stating that "John Carter is remarkable as an example of generative narrative mechanics in the form of a board and counter Wargame."

== Other reviews and commentary ==
- American Wargamer Vol. 8, No. 12
