= Gulf Strike (video game) =

1984 video game

- Publisher(s): The Avalon Hill Game Company
- Platform(s): Apple II, Atari 8-bit, Commodore 64, MS-DOS
- Release: 1984
- Genre(s): Strategy

Gulf Strike is a computer wargame published by The Avalon Hill Game Company in 1984.

== Gameplay ==
Gulf Strike is a game, based on the Gulf Strike board game, in which a stalemate between Iran and Iraq is about to be resolved with one of them winning, and the US and USSR intervene to take control of Iran.

== Reception ==
Mark Bausman reviewed the game for Computer Gaming World, and stated that "GS is a detailed game which can be played by both intermediate and advanced wargamers and provides the players with a wide variety of strategic options. The human-computer interface is nicely done considering the amount of items the program must handle."
