= Tsushima (game) =

1975 naval wargame

Tsushima is a board wargame published by Game Designers' Workshop (GDW) in 1975 that simulates naval battles during the Russo-Japanese War of 1904-1905. Tsushima was part of a two-game collection titled The Russo-Japanese War. The second game in the box was Port Arthur, which covered the land combat during the war. The two games could either be played separately, or combined into one master game.

== Background ==
The expanding geographical interests of Russia and Japan collided in the late 19th century, and resulted in a formal declaration of war in 1904. In 1904 and 1905, the opposing forces engaged in both land and sea combat in which Japanese forces proved they were the equal and often superior to the European forces.

== Description ==
Tsushima is a two-player game in which one player controls Russian naval forces and the other player controls Japanese naval forces.

=== Components ===
- 22" x 28* paper hex grid map scaled at 102 nautical miles (190 km) per hex
- 176 die-cut counters
- rule book

=== Gameplay ===
Each turn has six phases:

1. Japanese Movement Phase
2. Japanese Spotting and Combat Phase
3. Russian Movement Phase
4. Russian Spotting and Combat Phase
5. Joint Terminal Phase

This completes one game turn, which represents one month of game time.

When opposing naval forces enter the same hex, they must search for each other. If they find each other, counters are transferred to a tactical battle board and placed in parallel lines. Only one ship can fire at an enemy ship — if one force has more ships than the other, the owning player must decide which ships fire and which ships remain idle.

=== Scenarios ===
The game offers one long (23 turn) historical scenario, as well as four short scenarios:

- "The Battle of Port Arthur"
- "The Destruction of the Variag at Chemulpo"
- "The Battle of Round Island"
- "The Battle of Tsushima"

=== Victory conditions ===
- Campaign game: Victory is determined by both "Control of the Sea" and the amount of damage inflicted on the opposing forces.
- Short scenarios: Victory conditions vary according to the scenario.

== Publication history ==
In 1976, GDW published The Russo-Japanese War, a two-game collection of Tsushima (naval combat) and Port Arthur (land combat). Both were designed by Marc Miller, and featured the artwork of Rich Banner.

Following the demise of SPI, Hobby Japan acquired the rights to The Russo-Japanese War and printed a Japanese-language version in Command #55 (March–April 2004).

== Reception ==
In Issue 8 of Perfidious Albion, Geoff Barnard and Charles Vasey exchanged thoughts about the game. Vasey commented, "The actual naval clashes are pretty accurate I feel, they are not thrilling however." Barnard replied, "Having agreed with the above, I would add that I am not very happy with the rather basic 'hit' system used for combat results. I suppose it serves its purpose fairly well, but I would have preferred a tactical combat system with more result variations than are allowed here." In Issue 20, both Vasey and Barnard commented on playing the combination of Tsushima and Port Arthur as one campaign game. Vasey noted that "the naval section takes on a whole new meaning with both sides seeking to influence the land campaign, by the careful use of their fleets." Barnard concurred, commenting, "The land/sea combined game certainly works well and gives an excellent insight into the value of controlling the sea during a land campaign ... The two games do stand on their own, but played together, Tsushima places superbly realistic constraints upon the land campaign, while Port Arthur provides a considerable incentive to play the naval game for all its worth."

In the 1977 book The Comprehensive Guide to Board Wargaming, Nicholas Palmer commented "Tsushima can be played with Port Arthur, or with abstract rules reflecting the course of the land action; the former seems to be the most interesting version, with the latter rather simple."

In Issue 6 of the UK wargaming magazine Phoenix, Rob Gibson called Tsushima "an excellent game, recreating the feel of the period with its formalised lines of battle and the uncertainties of operating the modern steam-driven warships." Gibson liked the detail provided, including "the effects of primary and secondary armament, having too many ships to fire on too few, torpedo attacks — you name it and it's there." He concluded, "I think a lot of people will enjoy it and not only the naval 'Buffs' at that."

In Issue 10 of Phoenix, Ralph Vickers was highly critical of the historicity of the game, saying that the rules for tactical combat, particularly the restriction to use parallel lines of ships that could only fire at one ship at a time, was "arbitrary and unrealistic." Other than the tactical battles, Vickers liked the game, saying, "Tsushima has many elements of a good game. [...] The strategic movement phases are fun, there are interesting rules about morale, repairing damaged ships, secondary weapons, spotting, town raids, mines." However, this wasn't enough to overcome the issues of the tactical rules, and he concluded, "This game I can only recommend to players who like to tinker with rules or those who are confident they can devise for themselves a better combat system."

In Issue 27 of Moves, Richard Berg complained about the "loose" style of Tsushima's rules that he thought had been written "very explanatorially, rather than legalistically", saying, "If a new person picked up [Tsushima], they wouldn't know what the hell [the game designers] were talking about. [...] The main problem with rules that are loosely written, or written in a rather offhand fashion, is that the designer makes assumptions that you cannot assume that the player is going to make."

In The Guide to Simulations/Games for Education and Training, Martin Campion warned teachers looking to use this game in the classroom that "Some of the rules need to be interpreted in the spirit of the game rather than by their letter, so active refereeing is necessary if you want to use this game."

== Other reviews and commentary ==
- The Wargamer Vol.2 #18
- Perfidious Albion #16
