= Raid! Commando Operations, in the 20th Century =

1977 tactical board wargame

Strategy & Tactics #35 featuring the free game Raid!

Raid! Commando Operations, in the 20th Century is a board game published by Simulations Publications (SPI) in 1977 that simulates small-scale commando or special forces operations.

== Description ==
Raid! is a two-player tactical board wargame about commando operations. Scenarios range from World War II to the Vietnam War. Each troop counter represents 2–4 soldiers, and there are also counters for helicopters and vehicles. Six color hex grid maps featuring a variety of terrain — buildings, heavy forest or jungle, rice paddies/wheat fields, a coastal fishing village — are scaled at 25 m (27 yd) per hex.

The combat rules are largely taken from SPI's previously published wargame FireFight, although the unpopular simultaneous movement ("simove") system has been replaced by a sequential unit-by-unit fire and movement system. As critic Mark Edwards noted, "[This] should bring some relief to owners of previous SPI tactical games employing the simove system."

Eight scenarios are included, five of them based on historical events during World War II, the Vietnam War and Operation Entebbe. Three others are non-historical. As critic Martin Campion noted, "The designer encourages most players to design their own scenarios."

== Publication history ==
Raid! was designed by Mark Herman and Tony Merriday, with graphic design by Redmond Simonsen, and was published in SPI's house magazine Strategy & Tactics #64 (September–October 1977) as a free pull-out game. It was also released as a boxed set. The game failed to crack SPI's Top Ten Bestseller list.

== Reception ==
Rodger MacGowan, writing for Fire & Movement said "The game was criticized most for its incomplete rules and mapsheet and for its lack of 'realism'. It still deserves your attention in terms of its treatment of combat in Vietnam."

In Issue 35 of Moves, Mark Edwards commented, "Raid is a fast-paced game that gives the players a feel for the various problems confronting commando forces — the need for speed, the limitations of command control, and the need to properly combine the uses of various infantry weapons to name a few. Preventing the enemy from handling these problems by bogging him down, dividing his forces, and maintaining freedom for your own units is the key to victory."

In The Guide to Simulations/Games for Education and Training, Martin Campion was not impressed by the selection of scenarios, especially the raid at Entebbe, which he called "uninteresting."
