= Terrible Swift Sword (game) =

1976 American Civil War board wargame

- Terrible Swift Sword box cover Terrible Swift Sword (1976) by SPI
- Players: 2+
- Setup time: 30 minutes to 1 hour or more
- Playing time: 6 to 50 hours
- Chance: Medium
- Age range: 16+
- Skills: Tactics, strategy
- First regimental-level Gettysburg game

Terrible Swift Sword: Battle of Gettysburg Game (often abbreviated TSS) is a grand tactical regimental level board wargame published by Simulations Publications, Inc. (SPI) in 1976 that simulates the Battle of Gettysburg during the American Civil War. A second edition was published by TSR in 1986.

== Description ==
TSS, with over 1000 counters, is classified as a "monster" wargame; as one of the largest board games ever produced, it often takes longer to play than the actual 3-day battle of July 1–3, 1863. The game's title comes from the third line of the Battle Hymn of the Republic: "He hath loosed the fateful lightning of His terrible swift sword." The name was often parodied, given the play time required, as "Terrible Slow Sword."

=== Components ===
The game box contains:

- Three 22" x 34" paper hex grid maps scaled at 120 yd (110 m) per hex
- 32-page rulebook
- 2000 die-cut counters
- historical situation briefing booklet
- various play aids
- six-sided die

=== Gameplay ===
Each daylight turn represents 20 minutes of the battle; each night is divided into 8 turns representing 1 hour each. The game includes several scenarios that can be played separately:

- The First Day (29 turns). This requires the Union to fight a skilful retreat with John Buford’s cavalry brigades.
- The Second Day (40 turns).
- Little Round Top (6 turns). Nick Palmer wrote that this scenario is supposed to take three hours but actually takes eight, but provides a good overview of the game.
- The Third Day (Pickett's Charge) (21 turns)

Palmer wrote that the one day scenarios take two days of real time to play.

Alternatively the players can simulate the entire battle in the "Grand Battle Game: The Three Days of Gettysburg", which takes 149 turns, requiring about 50 hours of playing time.

When a unit suffers losses, it does so in steps of 100 men. This also affects morale, since each unit is rated for how many strength points it can lose before its Brigade Combat Effectiveness is destroyed. Such a unit cannot initiate melee and is more susceptible to rout. Each side has leaders as well at the Army, Corps and Division level (and the Confederates also have Brigade leaders). Units must stay within a certain distance of their leader in order to move. Leaders also affect morale and are needed for movement and attack; juniors may be promoted to replace dead leaders, often less effectively. The Confederates have better leaders, but the Union forces have more firepower.

Only two units of up to 8 strength points can be stacked on a hex, and only the top unit can fire and take damage.

The game contains rules for team play, in which players may send messages and request face-to-face meetings, but these work best with players who are already competent with the game. Much of the game system derives from La Bataille de la Moskowa and from miniatures play, with the effect of different types of rifle being simulated. Cavalry are ineffective on the battlefield (they were used largely for reconnaissance and dismounted defence by that era) and are expensive in victory points if lost.

Each turn begins with a number of phases:

- First player Offensive artillery
- Other player Defensive artillery
- First player Movement
- Other player Artillery fire (any units that have not already fired)
- First player Artillery fire (any units that have not already fired)
- Other player retreats units threatened by melee
- First player Melee
- First player attempts to rally routed units

The turn ends with the second player repeating the above steps.

== Publication history ==
Terrible Swift Sword was designed by Richard Berg, with graphic design by Redmond A. Simonsen, and was published by SPI in July 1976 in both double "flat-pack" and "soap box" editions. The game immediately rose to #4 on SPI's Top Ten Bestseller list, and stayed in the Top Ten for the next eight months. Sales of the game reached 30,000 units.

Stonewall: The Battle of Kernstown, a smaller game using the same game system, was also published. This covered the First Battle of Kernstown, in which Stonewall Jackson defeated a Union force superior in numbers and firepower but inferior in morale if ordered to move, let alone fight.

TSS was the first of what would become a series of eight SPI wargames about the American Civil War, called Great Battles of the American Civil War (GBACW).

TSR took over SPI in 1982 and republished a number of popular SPI titles in new TSR packaging. This included Terrible Swift Sword, which was republished with artwork by Larry Elmore in 1986. Like its predecessor, this edition also sold over 30,000 units.

As a continuation of the GBACW series, TSR published the separate American Civil War game Rebel Sabers: Civil War Cavalry Battles in 1986. One of the four scenarios, "Dutch Roads", a simulation of a cavalry battle during Gettysburg, can be linked to gameplay during TSS.

Nearly twenty years after the publication of TSS, original designer Richard Berg redesigned the game, which was released in 1995 by GMT Games as The Three Days of Gettysburg, with artwork by Rodger B. MacGowan.

== Reception ==
In Issue 11 of Perfidious Albion, Geoff Barnard and Charles Vasey exchanged thoughts about the game. Vasey commented, "Wow, a big new game. I say new but a lot of the rules are pretty standard, what Richard Berg has done is take them, polish them up, re-tune and finally synchronise all these good ideas into one new system." Barnard replied, "This game is certainly another marathon, but ... one can savour the detail and the realism as you go along." Vasey concluded, "In play one really gets the feel of the period, attacks really are bloody and must be pushed to the limit ... A real slogger, but an accurate simulation." Barnard concluded, "Another game for really getting into, it would seem well worth the price." Three issues later, Vasey published further thoughts after more experience with the game. Vasey found artillery ineffective and questioned the damage tables. Vasey also found problems with the morale rule, which he thought was "A great idea but not really well executed." However, Vasey complimented the well-organized rules, and liked the game design, commenting, "A close attempt has obviously been made to mirror the realities of the battle and to make the correct tactics the ones you want to use, and will win with." Vasey also liked the leader rules. Vasey concluded that it was "an excellent overall system that requires some little work. With this work it is an excellent game which really feels 19th century ... I do not regret buying the game and would recommend it to all battle-freaks." In Issue 19, Tom Oleson added, "In length it is just to the good side of the border between the sublime and the ridiculous ... For those interested in a game of this scale on this period, there is little need to look elsewhere."

In his 1977 book The Comprehensive Guide to Board Wargaming, Nicholas Palmer called the game "strongly tactical in emphasis, with particularly detailed rules for firing different types of weapons" which "plays smoothly". Palmer concluded, "A magnificent simulation, but far from swift."

In Issue 54 of Moves, Steve List warned of the "many, many detailed rules" and called the game "dauntingly complex." He concluded by giving the game a grade of B, saying, "beware of the time it takes to play. A solid weekend of diligent activity might suffice to reach a conclusion in a single day scenario, but the whole battle cannot be played out in one sitting."

In The Guide to Simulations/Games for Education and Training, Martin Campion commented on its use as a classroom aid, saying, "The duration of the grand battle version of this game makes it unlikely that any class could play it in this way, but much can be learned from shorter playings." Campion advised that if the teacher acts as referee and knows the rules, the students don't need to be experts. He further advised "teach the players how to move, how to change formations, and a few other things. Then get started on a series of made-up small battles [...] After three or four short preparatory battles, give them one of the shorter scenarios of Gettysburg to play out."

In the 1980 book The Complete Book of Wargames, game designer Jon Freeman commented "The game is immense, but so is the enjoyment." He noted "The historical situation provides many opportunities for both players to exercise their initiative in bold strokes of tactical brilliance." Freeman concluded by giving the game an Overall Evaluation of "Very Good", saying, "It's more playable that you would expect of a monster this size.

Wargame Academy considers TSS to be the "patriarch" of all subsequent wargames and computer games about Gettysburg. The game was rated as "simple enough for high playability yet with lots of room for maneuver and player strategy."

TSS was chosen for inclusion in the 2007 book Hobby Games: The 100 Best.

== Awards ==
At the 1977 Origins Awards, Terrible Swift Sword won the Charles S. Roberts Award for "Best Tactical Game of 1976". TSS was also a finalist for "Best Graphics and Physical Systems of 1976."

== Other reviews ==
- Fire & Movement #5, #6, #10, #53, #58, #83, #89
- Grenadier #32
- Line of Departure #6
- Phoenix #11
- The Wargamer Vol.1 #3 and Vol1. #5
- 1980 Games 100 in Games
- Games & Puzzles #61, 72
- The Playboy Winner's Guide to Board Games
