= Gulf Strike (board game) =

1983 board game

1st edition with cover art by Ted Koller (1983)

Gulf Strike, subtitled "Land, Air and Sea Combat in the Persian Gulf", is a board wargame published by Victory Games in 1983. The first and second editions were hypothetical games focussed on American responses to Iranian aggression in the Persian Gulf. The third edition, published in 1990, was updated to reflect the reality of Operation Desert Shield during the Gulf War.

== Publication history ==
In 1982, role-playing game publisher TSR unexpectedly took over wargame publisher Simulations Publications Inc. (SPI). Many SPI game designers soon left the company and were picked up by Avalon Hill, who formed them into a special wargames division called Victory Games. One of these designers, Mark Herman, was looking for a region that would present possibilities for a confrontation of the world's superpowers, and settled on the volatile Persian Gulf region and the ongoing Iran–Iraq War as inspiration. The result was Gulf Strike, the first wargame published by Victory in 1983, featuring cover art by Ted Koller.

Cover of 3rd edition (1990), using 2nd edition cover art by James Talbot with addition of Saddam Hussein and "Desert Shield" heading

With the end of the Iran–Iraq War in 1988, Victory released an updated second edition with new cover art by James Talbot. In 1990, following the invasion of Kuwait by Iraq and the world's response in Operation Desert Shield, Victory reissued the second edition with a black-and-white "Desert Shield" sticker on the box and the addition of an "Operation Desert Shield" folder containing a new scenario and more counters. This was quickly replaced by a third edition box that reused James Talbot's artwork, but superimposed a black-and-white portrait of Saddam Hussein with the words "includes Desert Shield expansion module."

== Description ==
Gulf Strike is a 2-player operational level wargame first published during the protracted Iran–Iraq War that simulates the possible confrontation of superpowers, who are drawn into conflict in the Gulf Region of the Middle East using tactics and equipment of the 1980s. The game includes all aspects of military operations of the time, including air, naval and land combat.

=== Components ===
The first edition (1983) includes:

- two 22 × 32" mapsheets (tactical map scaled at 28 km/17 mi per hex))
- two 22 × 16" mapsheets (strategic map scaled at 280 km/175 mi per hex)
- 910 counters
- 60-page rulebook

In addition to these components, the second edition (1988) added a new 16-page Scenario booklet, another mapsheet and another 130 counters. The third edition (1990) added a "Desert Shield" expansion to the second edition that included a 12-page scenario booklet and another 260 counters.

=== Scenarios ===
The 1st edition offers a short introductory scenario to introduce the rules system, and five full scenarios:

1. Iran prepares to invade pro-Iraq Gulf states
2. The Soviet Union invades Iran
3. A repeat of Scenario 2 with a change of national forces
4. The Iran–Iraq War in 1982, a solitaire scenario
5. American and Soviet forces confront each other in a dispute over factions in Somalia

The second edition (1988) added a sixth scenario in which the major players in the Gulf region are caught up in an Iranian attempt to interrupt the flow of oil through the Straits of Hormuz.

The third edition (1990) offers a seventh scenario based on Operation Desert Shield, with four options that appeared to exist at the time (released before the start of the Americans' Operation Desert Storm):

- Iraq continues its invasion of Kuwait by invading Saudi Arabia
- Iraq is given options on how to invade Saudi Arabia
- American forces attack Iraqi forces in Kuwait
- American forces invade Iraq from Saudi Arabia

=== Gameplay ===
==== Modes ====
Every unit has two modes. Land units are either designated front-line or reserve; naval units are either underway or in port; and air units are either in intercept or offensive mode. Each mode allows certain actions to be performed, while denying the unit other actions.

==== Movement ====
The game designer, Mark Herman, specifically tried to move away from the "I go, You go" game system. Accordingly, each turn has three action stages. In each action stage, the two players roll dice to determine initiative; the winner moves as many units as they wish. Movement of air and naval units may trigger interceptions by the other player. Once the first player is done, the second player then can move as many units as desired, which again may trigger interceptions from the other player.

==== Combat ====
Land units calculate the ratio of attacker to defender, then roll a die and consult a table, applying penalties or bonuses for things like terrain and supporting units. Air and naval units simply roll a die to determine how many hits are made.

==== Supply ====
Although naval units, and carrier-based aircraft do not use supply, land units and ground-based aircraft require supply or they cannot move or fight.

== Reception ==
In Issue 26 of The Wargamer (Summer 1983), John Alsen thought the 1st edition game components were "very attractive", and found few rules ambiguities. But he warned that the new style of rules had a consequence: "Only veteran players will realize that play not prohibited by the rules is allowed (if not encouraged) by the fluid game system." Alsen concluded, "This is a game to be recommended to those gamers favoring higher complexity games with an interest in modern era combat. The production values are quite high and an excellent visual product is the result."

In Issue 3 of Games International (March 1989), Ellis Simpson reviewed the second (1988) edition of Gulf Strike and found the rules were complex. Simpson highly recommended playing the training scenario several times. He concluded by giving the game an above-average rating of 4 stars out of 5, saying, "Gulf Strike is for gamers who want to play, to learn and enjoy. Winning is not everything."

=== Other recognition ===
A copy of the 1st edition of Gulf Strike is held in the collection of the Strong National Museum of Play, a gift of Darwin Bromley and Peter Bromley.

=== Other reviews and commentary ===
- Casus Belli #21 (Aug 1984)
- Fire & Movement #40
- Moves #62
- Strategy Plus
- Breakout

== Legacy ==
In 1984, Avalon Hill published a video game based on the board game for the Apple II, Atari 8-bit computers, Commodore 64, and MS-DOS.
