= Tyre: Alexander's Siege and Assault =

Board wargame published in 1978

Tyre: Alexander's Siege and Assault is a board wargame published by Simulations Publications, Inc. (SPI) in 1978 that simulates the Siege of Tyre in 332 BCE. The game was originally part of the four-game collection The Art of Siege, and was also released as a stand-alone "folio" game.

== Background ==
In 332 BCE, Alexander the Great laid siege to the island fortress of Tyre. After his engineers tried in vain for months to build a causeway to the island, Alexander changed his strategy, gathered all the fleets from port cities he had already conquered, and launched an amphibious assault on the fortress.

== Description ==
Tyre is a two-player wargame where one player controls the Macedonian besiegers, and the other player controls the Persian defenders. With a small map and only 200 counters, the game has been characterized as "simple".

=== Gameplay ===
The game system, adapted from SPI's 1972 game Napoleon at War, uses an alternating "I Go, You Go" series of turns, where one player moves and attacks, followed by the other player.

== Publication history ==
In 1975, SPI published Blue & Gray, its first quadrigame — four different battles using the same set of rules, packaged into one box. The concept proved popular, and SPI published an entire series of quadrigames, including The Art of Siege in 1978. One of the four games included was Tyre, designed by Mark Herman, with graphic design by Redmond A. Simonsen. Tyre was also released as an individual game.

== Reception ==
In Issue 48 of Moves, Stephen Clifford liked the naval engagement rules of Tyre, but felt "the system is too inflexible to give the full picture of the siege of Tyre." Despite this, Clifford concluded, "On the whole, then, Tyre is a quite successful representation of Ancient siegecraft, and is very good on naval combat in particular."

In Issue 22 of Fire & Movement, Peter Mantini was quite complimentary about Tyre, calling it "a dandy little simulation [...] Tyre is an integrated land and sea conflict of sustained excitement."

== Other reviews ==
- Fire & Movement #65
- International Wargamer Vol.3 #11
