= Sevastapol: The First Modern Siege =

Board wargame published in 1978

Sevastapol: The First Modern Siege is a board wargame published by Simulations Publications, Inc. (SPI) in 1978 that simulates the Siege of Sevastopol during the Crimean War. The game was originally part of the four-game collection The Art of Siege, and was also released as a stand-alone "folio" game.

== Background ==
During the Crimean War of 1854–1855, French and British forces laid siege to the Russian fortress of Sevastapol in an attempt to prevent Russia's Black Sea fleet from attacking Turkey.

== Description ==
Sevastapol is a two-player wargame where one player controls the Anglo-French besiegers, and the other player controls the Russian defenders. With a small map and only 200 counters, the game has been characterized as "simple".

=== Gameplay ===
The game system, adapted from SPI's 1972 game Napoleon at War, uses an alternating "I Go, You Go" series of turns, where one player moves and attacks, followed by the other player.

Unlike most wargames of the time, Sevastapol does not use a hex grid map,. Instead, counters are moved from area to area. Artillery fire uses a measuring stick, like miniatures wargames.

== Publication history ==
In 1975, SPI published Blue & Gray, its first quadrigame — four different battles using the same set of rules, packaged into one box. The concept proved popular, and SPI published an entire series of quadrigames, including The Art of Siege in 1978. One of the four games included was Sevastapol, designed by Robert Mosca, with graphic design by Redmond A. Simonsen. Sevastapol was also released as an individual game.

== Reception ==
In Issue 37 of the British wargaming magazine Perfidious Albion, Charles Vasey commented, "I was agreeably surprised by this game, it is extremely original in design and purpose ... The map is effective, the counters smart (and all with titles), the trench building is realistic enough without being tedious and the assaults are thrilling affairs." Vasey found few problems with either the rules or the historical accuracy, and concluded, "A good game, with sufficient interest to appeal to players from any period."

In Issue 48 of Moves, Geoff Barnard commented, "I must admit that, as a game, Sevastopol works well. There is a lot of color, the objectives of both sides are clearly defined, and there are interesting things for each side to do. Sevastapol is, however, supposed to be a simulation, and what I'm more concerned about is the extent to which it is valid." Barnard noted, "One is left with the impression that the designer of this game may have left out more than necessary in order to make the game fit the format." He concluded, "Although Sevastapol remains an interesting game, as a simulation it is true only to a very limited part of the activities of the siege."

In the 1980 book The Complete Book of Wargames, game designer Jon Freeman commented that the game "may not have the most playable of systems; it does however, fill an important historical hole in the hobby." Freeman concluded "Except for being somewhat less interesting than Lille, the game is quite similar. [...] There is, however, a bit more movement by the defenders in this case."

== Other reviews ==
- Fire & Movement #65
- International Wargamer Vol.3 #11
