= Lille: The Classic Vauban Siege =

Board wargame published in 1978

Lille: The Classic Vauban Siege is a board wargame published by Simulations Publications, Inc. (SPI) in 1978 that simulates the Siege of Lille in 1708. The game was originally part of the four-game collection The Art of Siege, and was also released as a stand-alone "folio" game.

== Background ==
In 1708, during the War of Spanish Succession, Anglo-Dutch forces under Duke of Marlborough and Prince Eugene besieged Lille, capital of French Flanders. The fortress of Lille had been designed by Marshal Sébastien Le Prestre de Vauban, who had considered it his crowning achievement. Against the well-defended fortress, the siege took three months and over 16,000 casualties to bring about a surrender.

== Description ==
Lille is a two-player wargame where one player controls the Dutch-Anglo besiegers, and the other player controls the French defenders. With a small map and only 200 counters, the game has been characterized as "simple".

=== Gameplay ===
The game system, adapted from SPI's 1972 game Napoleon at War, uses an alternating "I Go, You Go" series of turns, where one player moves and attacks, followed by the other player.

Unlike most wargames of the time, Lille does not use a hex grid map,. Instead, counters are moved from area to area. Artillery fire uses a measuring stick, like miniatures wargames.

== Publication history ==
In 1975, SPI published Blue & Gray, its first quadrigame — four different battles using the same set of rules, packaged into one box. The concept proved popular, and SPI published an entire series of quadrigames, including The Art of Siege in 1978. One of the four games included was Lille, designed by Dave Werden, with graphic design by Redmond A. Simonsen. Lille was also released as an individual game.

== Reception ==
In the 1980 book The Complete Book of Wargames, game designer Jon Freeman commented, "SPI took a big chance with their nonhex system, but to a great degree it works. The game truly develops — and looks like — a bird's-eye view of a siege, with its parallels and trenches sprouting and spreading." However, Freeman pointed out, "The main problem is that siegework is, in strategic terms, a bore. The defender sits around dodging a few shells and wondering what will happen, while the attacker works valiantly to get his trenches as far forward as he can. Everything is aimed for the final big assault, which comes several hours after you start. Thus, Lille requires a bit of stamina until you reach the good part." Freeman concluded by giving this game an Overall Evaluation of "Good."

In Issue 21 of Fire & Movement, J. Richard Jarvinen commented, "Despite [some] glaring errors [in the rules], I still found Lille to be an excellent game. Not only are the physical components nicely done, the game system itself is novel and appears to work well. I recommend it highly to any student of siege warfare or others interested in this period."

In The Wargamer, Peter Hatton liked Lille, saying, "SPI are to be congratulated on having brought us a siege of our period (Lille) with a real map on which to build our trench counters. The rules deal well with the approach work, and the actual assault is also probably good. Recommended."

== Other reviews ==
- Fire & Movement #65
- International Wargamer Vol.3 #11
