= Port Arthur (wargame) =

Board wargame published in 1975

Port Arthur is a board wargame published by Game Designers' Workshop (GDW) in 1975 that simulates combat during the Russo-Japanese War of 1904-1905. Port Arthur was part of a two-game collection titled The Russo-Japanese War. The second game in the box was Tsushima, which covered the naval combat during the war. The two games could either be played separately, or combined into one master game.

== Background ==
The expanding geographical interests of Russia and Japan collided in the late 19th century, and resulted in a formal declaration of war in 1904. In 1904 and 1905, the opposing forces engaged in both land and sea combat in which Japanese forces proved they were the equal and often superior to the European forces.

== Description ==
Port Arthur is a two-player game in which one player controls Russian forces and the other player controls Japanese forces in the struggle for the vital Port Arthur. If not played together with Tsushima, then naval combat becomes an off-map abstraction. On its own, with only a 22" x 28* paper hex grid map and 240 die-cut counters, the game is not complex. If played in concert with Tsushima, some have suggested making it a four-player game, with two naval players and two land generals.

=== Gameplay ===
The game uses a simple "I Go, You Go" system of alternating turns, where the Japanese player goes first, followed by the Russian player. Each has the following phases:

1. Movement
2. Combat
3. Supply and Reinforcement

This completes one game turn, which represents one month of game time.

== Publication history ==
In 1976, GDW published The Russo-Japanese War, a two-game collection of Tsushima (naval combat) and Port Arthur (land combat). Both were designed by Marc Miller, and featured the artwork of Rich Banner.

Following the demise of GDW, Hobby Japan acquired the rights to The Russo-Japanese War and printed a Japanese-language version in Command #55 (March–April 2004).

== Reception ==
In Issue 8 of Perfidious Albion, Geoff Barnard and Charles Vasey exchanged thoughts about the game. Vasey commented, "The system is pretty simple and is soon grasped. The relationship between supplies and attacks is very properly made and prevents the attacks all down the line." Vasey did have one complaint, noting, "This period is famous for attackers being bled white but here the attackers never suffer any losses. Of course this may be represented in the use of supplies but it still feels wrong." Barnard replied, " Could be an interesting game, but the opening moves are very subject to a couple of die rolls." Barnard also questioned the replayability of the game, believing that most games would follow the same path. In Issue 20, both Vasey and Barnard commented on playing the combination of Tsushima and Port Arthur as one campaign game. Vasey noted that "the naval section takes on a whole new meaning with both sides seeking to influence the land campaign, by the careful use of their fleets." Barnard concurred, commenting, "The land/sea combined game certainly works well and gives an excellent insight into the value of controlling the sea during a land campaign ... The two games do stand on their own, but played together, Tsushima places superbly realistic constraints upon the land campaign, while Port Arthur provides a considerable incentive to play the naval game for all its worth." Barnard also noted, "As a result of the combat/supply system, the land segment (Port Arthur) is very prone to clog up, and form a near static front system, as tended to happen in the real campaign. The [Japanese player] therefore needs the ability of move and land freely by sea in order to retain any sort of control over the course of the war, otherwise the Russian [player] can calmly keep him at arm's length."

In the 1977 book The Comprehensive Guide to Board Wargaming, Nicholas Palmer commented "The crucial struggle is for the port itself, the only warm-water one available to the Russians in the area; this makes the joint game with Tsushima particularly interesting, though Port Arthur can be played on its own with abstract naval rules." Palmer noted several issues with the rules about supply and stacking.

In Issue 10 of Phoenix, Ralph Vickers was highly critical of the historicity of the game, and he also found issues with the rules for troop movement. After a lengthy and critical analysis, he concluded, "If GDW happened to ask me what I thought of this game before they published it, I would have looked at all that talent and said, 'Well, the game's okay, but you guys can do better than this. Get back to the drawing board!"

In Issue 27 of Moves, Richard Berg complained about the "loose" style of the rules that he thought had been written "very explanatorially, rather than legalistically", saying, "If a new person picked up [Tsushima], they wouldn't know what the hell [the game designers] were talking about. [...] The main problem with rules that are loosely written, or written in a rather offhand fashion, is that the designer makes assumptions that you cannot assume that the player is going to make."

In The Guide to Simulations/Games for Education and Training, Martin Campion warned teachers looking to use this game in the classroom that "Some of the rules need to be interpreted in the spirit of the game rather than by their letter, so active refereeing is necessary if you want to use this game."

== Other reviews and commentary ==
- The Wargamer Vol.2 #18
