= Pacific War: The Struggle Against Japan 1941-1945 =

Board game

Pacific War: The Struggle Against Japan 1941-1945 is a 1985 board game published by Victory Games.

== Gameplay ==
Pacific War: The Struggle Against Japan 1941-1945 is a game in which a grand strategic wargame runs through the entire Pacific Theater of World War II, spanning battles from Pearl Harbor to Japan's final defense, across diverse campaigns and regions.

== Reviews ==
- Casus Belli #32
- Games #76
