= The Art of Siege =

Board wargame published in 1979

- Designers: Phil Kosnett; Mark Herman; David Werden; Rob Mosca
- Illustrators: Redmond A. Simonsen
- Publishers: Simulations Publications Inc.
- Publication: 1979
- Genres: Siege warfare

The Art of Siege, subtitled "Four Great Siege Battles", is a collection of four board wargames published by Simulations Publications Inc. (SPI) in 1979 that simulates four famous sieges.

== Description ==
The Art of Siege is a "quadrigame" — a set of four games in the same box — that simulate four famous historical sieges:

- Acre: Richard Lionheart's Siege (1191): The siege of Acre by Crusader armies (designed by Phil Kosnett).
- Tyre: Alexander's Siege and Assault (322 BC): The amphibious assault on the island fortress of Tyre by Alexander the Great (designed by Mark Herman).
- Lille: The Classic Vauban Siege (1708): The siege of the French fortress by the Anglo-Dutch forces of the Duke of Marlborough (designed by David Werden).
- Sevastapol: The First Modern Siege (1854–55): The siege of the Russian fortress by the British and French during the Crimean War (designed by Rob Mosca).

=== Components ===
Each of the four games has its own set of components, which includes a paper hex grid map and 200 double-sided cardboard counters. Unlike previous SPI quadrigames that featured a common set of rules used by all four games in the box, each game in The Art of Siege has its own unique rules and gameplay.

=== Gameplay ===
==== Tyre ====
Each game turn is one week and is broken down into "impulses". Both armies spend the first few turns preparing for the coming naval assault. The Greek attacker must choose between spending time on a naval bombardment or starting the actual assault. Once the Greeks launch their attack, they have 16 impulses to take both the Agrendium and the Temple of Hercules or they lose the game.

==== Acre ====
Each game turn represents two days and is broken down into a number of phases, including Planning; Bombardment and Repair; and Assault, Regrouping, and Repair. There are rules for catapults, tunnelling, repairing walls, ladder assaults, and leaders.

If at the end of any Assault phase, ten Crusader units plus one leader occupy hexes within Acre, or if Saladin is killed, then the Crusaders win. If at the end of any Assault phase, Muslim units occupy 12 Crusader camps, or if both Richard I and Philip I have been killed, or if the Crusaders fail to win by Game Turn 16, then the Muslims win. (If both sides claim victory at the end of an Assault phase, then the game ends in a draw.)

==== Lille ====
Unlike Tyre and Acre, Lille uses a hexless map, where ranges and movement are calculated using a range stick to measure distances. The game begins with the besiegers constructing a series of trenches to approach the walls of the fortress while under cover, while the defenders strengthen their defenses. Once the attacker is ready, the assault begins. The besieging player must capture one star bastion from the French before the end of Game Turn 12 in order to win. The French player must prevent this to win.

==== Sevastopol ====
Like Lille, this game also uses a hexless map and also starts with siegework construction, this time by the English & French, while the Russians strengthen their defences. The game lasts 18 Game Turns. The French/English player must capture two bastions — at least one of them a major bastion — before the end of the game to win. The Russian player wins by preventing this.

== Publication history ==
In 1975, SPI published Blue & Gray: Four American Civil War Battles, its first quadrigame — four different battles using the same set of rules, packaged into one box. The concept proved popular, and SPI published an entire series of quadrigames, including The Art of Siege in 1979. Redmond A. Simonsen provided the graphic design for all four games in the boxed set.

It was not a popular product, and did not appear in SPI's Top Ten Bestseller list.

== Reception ==
In Issue 19 of Phoenix, Ralph Vickers liked the use of hexless maps, saying that for the two battles chosen, "Not only were hexes not needed [...] but they would have been a hindrance." He also called these two games "a very interesting experiment, and are worth the consideration of everyone in the hobby who wants to keep up with the latest developments." He concluded, "Let us hope that SPI continues to maintain the generally high standards they have achieved in these Art of Siege quads."

In Issue 36 of Phoenix, William Hamblin reviewed Acre, and found several inaccuracies in the historical reconstruction, from weapons and armor to tactics and the names of various types of units. But he admitted, "On the whole, the game is enjoyable to play and offers a number of interesting challenges to players on both sides." Nevertheless, he concluded, "In a sense, the historical inaccuracies make it so that the game is not really an historical simulation of the siege of Acre, but rather a 'fantasy' game wearing an historical mask."

In Issue 48 of Moves, Stephen Clifford, Pete Bartlam, and Geoff Barnard combined to review three of the four games. Clifford liked the naval engagement rules of Tyre, but felt "the system is too inflexible to give the full picture of the siege of Tyre." Bartlam thought the opening phase of Acre dragged on, and felt the final assault didn't feel right, saying, "It should be much more dangerous up against the walls, making it necessary to employ a lot of arrow-fodder, with units who successfully breach the defenses having much more effect [...] One doesn't get the feeling of desperate men clawing their way to the parapets, rung by rung, through a hail of arrows." He concluded the game was "an enjoyable, playable game, a good simulation of a siege, with one or two caveats, but a minus for medieval flavor." Barnard found that Sevastopol "works well. There is a lot of color, the objectives of both sides are clearly defined, and there are interesting things for each side to do." But he was disappointed in the historical accuracy of the game, and felt that the designer might have had to simplify the game too much in order to fit it into the quadrigame format.

In the 1980 book The Complete Book of Wargames, game designer Jon Freeman commented "The Art of Siege may not have the most playable of systems; it does however, fill an important historical hole in the hobby." Freeman also reviewed three of the games in the boxed set:

- Acre: "Shows some interest in the combat aspects of the siege thanks to the presence of Saladin's army as a constant threat to the besieging Crusaders [...] Probably the most playable of the four [games]."
- Lille: "The main problem is that siegework is, in strategic terms, a bore. The defender sits around dodging a few shells and wondering what will happen, while the attacker works valiantly to get his trenches as far forward as he can. Everything is aimed for the final big assault, which comes several hours after you start. Thus Lille requires a bit of stamina until you reach the good part."
- Sevastopol: "Except for being somewhat less interesting than Lille, the game is quite similar. [...] There is, however, a bit more movement by the defenders in this case."

In Issue 22 of Fire & Movement, Peter Mantini was quite complimentary about Tyre, calling it "a dandy little simulation [...] Tyre is an integrated land and sea conflict of sustained excitement."

In The Wargamer, Peter Hatton liked Lille, saying, "SPI are to be congratulated on having brought us a siege of our period (Lille) with a real map on which to build our trench counters. The rules deal well with the approach work, and the actual assault is also probably good. Recommended."

In a retrospective review in Issue 20 of Simulacrum, David Chancellor and Luc Olivier noted that twenty-five years after its publication, the game remained a highly collectible item: "The Art of Siege has traditionally been one of the more sought-after quadrigames. As one of the only simulations focused on siegecraft, its unique gameplay and topics make it a must-have for fans of fortress-based warfare."

== Other reviews and commentary ==
- Casus Belli #15 (June 1983)
