= A Famous Victory =

A Famous Victory is a 1994 board game published by Moments in History.

== Gameplay ==
A Famous Victory is a game in which a rigid‑line, command‑chit wargame has leaders trigger movement and combat in half‑hour turns as infantry and cavalry grind each other down through disorder‑heavy fire, shock, and varied charge types.

== Reception ==
Perfidious Albion felt that "A Famous Victory is an atmospheric game which looks the part."

== Reviews ==
- Casus Belli #87
