= Richard Berg =

American wargame designer (1943–2019)

Richard Berg as the King of Diamonds in the Famous Game Designer Trading Cards deck produced by Flying Buffalo in 2014

Richard Harvey Berg (1943 – July 26, 2019) was an American wargame designer. He was inducted into the Charles Roberts Awards Hall of Fame in 1987.

== Early life, army, student and lawyer ==
Richard Berg was born in New York City. At age 21, he entered the United States Army, and served from 1967 to 1969, where he was assigned to be the musical director of the Army Theater in Frankfurt, West Germany. He earned a Bachelor of Arts from Union College in Schenectady, New York, majoring in Asian History, and then earned a Juris Doctor from Brooklyn Law School.

From 1971 to 1988, he worked as a criminal defense attorney in private practice and for the Legal Aid Society. He also worked as a media communications consultant, actor, director, author, lyricist, and composer, as well as working briefly for the Internal Revenue Service.

== Game designer ==
In 1975, Richard Berg had his first game published by Simulations Publications Inc. (SPI), a wargame titled Hooker and Lee: The Battle of Chancellorsville that was one of four games in SPI's Blue and Gray II quadrigame. His next game was Conquistador, which appeared in Issue 58 of SPI's Strategy & Tactics magazine. Set during the Spanish conquest of the New World, the game does not involve much combat; instead, players vie to accumulate as much wealth, land and exploration as possible. It was not a top seller for SPI. As the game's developer, Greg Costikyan explained, "S&T subscribers preferred hard World War II military games, and Conquistador was rather anomalous from their point of view."

It was Berg's next game in 1976 that would make his reputation as a top-line designer: Terrible Swift Sword, a monster game simulation of the Battle of Gettysburg. Although it had over 2000 counters, a 32-page rulebook, and often took longer to complete than the actual 3-day battle, SPI sold more than 30,000 copies. The game's unique combat and operational rules resulted in a host of imitators. The game won Berg his first Charles S. Roberts Award, for "Best Tactical Game of 1976". He would go on to win another eight "Charlies", seven of them after he was inducted into the Charles Roberts Awards Hall of Fame in 1987.

Other notable games included War of the Ring, which was SPI's bestselling game for almost two years; SPQR, which won Berg another Charlie and an Origins Award; the Great Battles of the American Civil War series, and the Great Battles of History series. His most notable and infamous game was The Campaign for North Africa, published by SPI in 1978. It has been called the longest board game ever produced, with estimates that a full game would take 1,500 hours to complete. It has also been called the most complex wargame ever designed, with the commonly cited example (noted in SPI's advertising) that Italian troops require additional daily water supplies to prepare pasta. The map board alone is 9.5 ft (3 m) long.

By the end of his career, he was credited as designer or co-designer of 195 games.

== Writer and editor ==
In 1980, Berg started writing and editing reviews of wargames, which SPI published as Richard Berg's Review of Games. It began as a two-page standalone newsletter, published twice a month for 25 issues. SPI then converted it into a regular feature in the pages of SPI's Strategy & Tactics until late 1985.

In the fall of 1991, Berg became editor of a self-published fanzine, the similarly titled Berg's Review of Games (or BROG). Berg differentiated this magazine from his previous one by adding "Vol. 2" to the issue number. He published BROG six times a year, ending publication with Issue 28.

In his original Richard Berg's Review of Games, Berg had started a satirical annual feature called the "Little Mac Awards" for dubious achievements in gaming. The awards were named for the less-than-stellar American Civil War general George McClellan. In Issue #2 of BROG, Berg restarted this tradition, handing out "Little Macs" to various companies and industry personalities for perceived errors and injustices.

Berg's Review of Games was awarded Best Amateur Adventure Gaming Magazine at the Origins Awards three times: in 1992, 1993, and 1995.

BROG was inducted into the Academy of Adventure Gaming Arts & Design's Hall of Fame in 1997.

== Death and legacy ==
Berg died in Charleston, South Carolina on July 26, 2019.

Berg was voted to be featured as the king of diamonds in Flying Buffalo's 2014 edition of their Famous Game Designer Trading Cards.

Berg's famous/infamous The Campaign for North Africa was featured in an eleventh season episode of The Big Bang Theory called "The Neonatal Nomenclature". During Bernadette's long labor, Sheldon pulls out The Campaign for North Africa, but despite his enthusiasm for the intricate details of the game, his friends show little interest.

== Awards ==
=== Charles S. Roberts Awards ===
- 1977 – Best Tactical Game : Terrible Swift Sword by Simulations Publications, Inc.
- 1977 – Best Fantasy or Science Fiction Wargame : War of the Ring by SPI
- 1984 – Best Pre-20th century Game : South Mountain by West End Games
- 1987 – Charles Roberts Awards Hall of Fame
- 1988 – Best Historical or Scenario Magazine Article : S&T #119 – Forrest at Bay
- 1990 – Lifetime Achievement in Simulation Design
- 1992 – Best Pre–World War Two Game : SPQR by GMT Games (with Mark Herman)
- 1994 – Best Pre–World War Two Game : The Battles of Waterloo by GMT Games
- 1995 – Best Amateur Wargaming Magazine : Berg's Review of Games (BROG)
- 1996 – Best Amateur Wargaming Magazine : Berg's Review of Games (BROG)
- 1996 – Best Pre–World War Two Game : Fields of Glory by Moments in History
- 1997 – Best Amateur Wargaming Magazine : Berg's Review of Games (BROG)
- 1998 – Best Amateur Wargaming Magazine :Berg's Review of Games (BROG)
- 2001 – Best DTP Game : Longbow by BSO Games
- 2004 – Best DTP Game : Louisiana Tigers by BSO Games
- 2006 – Best Magazine Game : Kulikovo 1380: the Golden Horde in Against the Odds

=== Other Awards ===
- 1993 – Inducted into GAMA Hall of Fame
- 2003 – Bloomgren/Hamilton Memorial Award for Lifetime Achievement

== Ludography ==
Richard Berg designed or co-designed the following:

- 13: The Colonies in Revolt (S&T-TSR)
- 1862 (SD)
- 1863 (GMT)
- A Famous Victory (MiH)
- A Gleam of Bayonets (SPI-TSR)
- Across the Rappahannock (GMT)
- Africanus (GMT, 1994)
- Alesia (GMT, 2004)
- Ancient World, Rise of the Roman Republic (GMT)
- Attila (GMT)
- Baton Rouge (S&T-3W)
- Battle for North Africa (GMT)
- The Battles of Waterloo (GMT)
- Birth of a Nation (3W)
- Bitter Victory (BSO)
- Blackbeard (Avalon Hill)
- Bloody April (SPI)
- Borodino (GMT)
- BSO Football (BSO)
- Caesar in Alexandria (GMT, 2001)
- Caesar: The Conquest of Gaul (GMT, 1998)
- The Campaign for North Africa (SPI)
- Caratacus (GMT)
- Carolina Rebels (BSO)
- Carthage (GMT)
- Cataphract (GMT)
- Chancellorsville (Clash of Arms)
- Chicken of the Sea (GPG)
- Confederate Rails (BSO)
- Conquistador (SPI, AH)
- The Conquerors (SPI)
- Constantinople (SPI)
- Consul for Rome (GMT, 1992)
- Corinth (SPI)
- The Crusades (SPI)
- Dead of Winter (SD)
- The Desert Fox (SPI)
- Devil's Horsemen (BSO)
- Devil's Horsemen (GMT)
- Diadochoi (GMT, 1995)
- Dictator (GMT, 1995)
- Dillinger (BSO)
- Druid (West End Games, 1984)
- East-West (BSO)
- Fields of Glory (MiH)
- First Blood (SD)
- Flintlock: Black Powder, Cold Steel Vol.1(Lock 'n Load, 2009)
- Gergovia (GMT, 2007)
- Geronimo (Avalon Hill)
- Glory (GMT)
- Gondor: The Siege of Minas Tirith (SPI)
- The Great Battles of Alexander (GMT)
- The Great Battles of Julius Caesar (GMT)
- Greek Tragedy (BSO)
- Gringo (GMT)
- The Guns of Cedar Creek (SD)
- Hastings, 1066 (S&T-TSR)
- Highlander (BSO)
- Hooker and Lee (SPI)
- The Horse Soldiers (S&T-3W)
- Juggernaut (GMT)
- Jugurtha (GMT, 1998)
- Julius Caesar (TSR-SPI)
- June 6 (GMT)
- Kingdom for a Horse (BSO)
- The Last Crusade (BSO)
- The Last Raid (BSO)
- Las Batallas de los Gringos (BSO)
- Les Pyramides (Vae Victis)
- Line of Fire (BSO)
- Lion of the North (GMT)
- Longbow (BSO)
- Louisiana Tigers (BSO)
- Mamluk (GMT)
- Manchu (S&T-3W)
- The Marlborough Man (BSO)
- Medieval (GMT)
- Men of Iron (GMT)
- Murfreesboro (Yaquinto)
- Nero (Phalanx)
- Pax Romana (GMT)
- Phalanx (GMT)
- The Prince (Phalanx)
- Pyrrhic Victory (GMT, 1993)
- Rebel Sabers (SPI-TSR)
- Red Badge of Courage (GMT)
- Rio Grande (S&T/DG)
- Risorgimento 1859 (GMT)
- River of Death (GMT)
- Rivoli 1797 (Vae Victis)
- Rough & Ready (S&T/Decision)
- Salamis (GMT)
- Samurai (GMT)
- Shiloh (West End Games)
- Shogun Triumphant (XTR)
- Sideshow (S&T-3W)
- Simon Says (BSO)
- Simple GBoH (GMT)
- Soldiers of the Queen (S&T-TSR)
- South Mountain (West End Games)
- SPI Baseball (SPI)
- SPI Football (SPI)
- SPQR (GMT, 1992)
- Successors (AH)
- Suleiman the Magnificent (ATO)
- Terrible Swift Sword (1st ed., SPI; 2nd ed., TSR)
- The Three Days of Gettysburg (GMT)
- Triumph & Glory (GMT)
- Turning Point (BSO)
- Tyrant (GMT)
- Veni, Vidi, Vici (GMT)
- Vera Cruz (SPI)
- War Elephant (GMT, 1992)
- War Galley (GMT)
- War of the Rebellion (DG)
- War of the Ring (SPI)
- Waterloo (Phalanx)
- Zama (BSO)
- Zulu! (BSO)
- Zurich, 1799 (Vae Victis)
