= Sicily: The Race for Messina =

1981 WWII board game

- Cover of Strategy & Tactics #89, which contained the pull-out game Sicily
- Designers: Dick Rustin
- Illustrators: Redmond A. Simonsen
- Publishers: Simulations Publications Inc.
- Publication: 1981
- Genres: WWII

Sicily: The Race for Messina is a board wargame published by Simulations Publications Inc. (SPI) in 1981 that simulates Operation Husky, the Allied invasion of Sicily during World War II.

== Background ==
With the conclusion of the North Africa campaign in May 1943, the victorious Allied powers — led by the United States and United Kingdom — decided to attack Axis forces in Europe via Italy. After a series of simultaneous landings on the island, American forces and an Anglo-Canadian army each became responsible for clearing half of the island.

== Description ==
Sicily is a board wargame for two players in which one player controls Allies forces and the other player controls Axis forces.

=== Gameplay ===
The game uses a set of rules initially adapted for SPI's Panzergruppe Guderian, and then adapted for Operation Typhoon. As with other "Victory in the West" games, each game turn consists of movement and combat by one player and then the other player. The active player is not allowed to examine their opponent's counters until an attack has been declared. Combat values for infantry and tank battalions are randomly determined at the start of the unit's first combat.

There are special rules for paratroop drops, support points, specific reinforcements and withdrawals for Germans and Italian troops.

=== Scenarios ===
The game includes:

- A short 4-turn scenario covering the American landings that is designed to teach the rules.
- A long 20-turn scenario that covers the entire invasion from beginning to end.
- A second 20-turn scenario that allows variable (non-historical) set-up, landing sites and paratroop drops.

== Publication history ==
In 1978, SPI published Operation Typhoon, a board wargame that used a rules system based on 1976's Panzergruppe Guderian. SPI then used Typhoon's rule set to create a series of wargames called "Victory in the West" that simulated the last months of World War II in Europe. The first two games were Patton's 3rd Army (1980), and Operation Grenade (1981). The third and final game of the series was Sicily: The Race to Messina, designed by Dick Rustin and published as a free pull-out game with graphic design by Redmond A. Simonsen in Issue 89 of Strategy & Tactics. SPI also published a boxed set edition.

== Reception ==
In Issue 52 of the British magazine Perfidious Albion, Geoffrey Barnard found this game tiresome, commenting, "I'm relieved to report that it was every bit as exciting as I'd suspected (snore)." Barnard did temper his comment a bit, writing, "To be fair, there is a lot more to Sicily, although it is a magazine game, it is quite big in scope." Despite this, Barnard concluded, "by the time you sort out the terrain factors, detailed supply rules, air support, combined arms and put the result into a standard SPI retreat/loss Combat Results Table, you discover that true excitement is somewhere else!"

In a retrospective review in Issue 14 of Simulacrum, Luc Olivier commented, "This game is the most ambitious and the largest of the three published in S&T ... The Game System rules are fully used, and the special rules are especially large and diverse ... The game flow reproduces reality with some twisted rules like army boundaries and support points, but overall the play is smooth." Olivier concluded, "The game is a good use of the [Operation Typhoon] System, but still one sided and requiring more time than for the previous games. Today, it is perhaps not the best game on the subject, but still a good follow-up if you invest time and money on the Victory in the West System.

== Other reviews and commentary ==
- Fire & Movement #29 and #60
- Casus Belli #13 (in French)
