= Operation Grenade (game) =

1980 WWII board wargame

- Cover of Strategy & Tactics #84, which contained Operation Grenade
- Designers: Joseph Balkoski
- Illustrators: Redmond A. Simonsen
- Publishers: Simulations Publications Inc.
- Publication: 1981
- Genres: World War II

Operation Grenade, subtitled "The Battle for the Rhineland 23 Feb. – 5 Mar. '45", is a board wargame published by Simulations Publications Inc. (SPI) in 1981 that simulates the crossing of the Roer river between Roermond and Düren by the U.S. Ninth Army in February 1945, which marked the beginning of the Allied invasion of Germany. This was the second of three wargames using a common set of rules in the "Victory in the West" series.

== Background ==
In early 1945, the closing months of World War II, the Allies had driven the Germans back across France and the Netherlands. To breach the German border defenses and cross the Rhine River into Germany, the Allies attacked along a broad front. At the northern end of the attack, in the area of the Rhineland, the First Canadian and Second British Armies attacked from the Netherlands (Operation Veritable), planning to link up with the U.S. Ninth Army crossing the Roer River (Operation Grenade). Both forces would then try to capture and hold one or more intact bridges across the Rhine into Germany.

The Canadian and British units started on time on 8 February, but Operation Grenade was significantly delayed when the Germans blew two dams, flooding the Roer River valley.

== Description ==
Operation Grenade is a two-player board wargame in which the German player uses flooding to aid the defense, while the American player fights to the Rhine and then tries to find an intact bridge to cross into Germany.

=== Components ===
The pullout game contains:

- 22" x 34" hex grid paper map scaled to 4 km (2.5 mi) per hex
- 245 die-cut counters
- rulebook for "Victory in the West" rules system
- book of rules unique to Operation Grenade

=== Gameplay ===
As with other "Victory in the West" games, a combat unit's true strength is randomly determined the first time it engages in combat. Each game turn represents one day – but the length of the game may be as long as 16 turns or as short as 10 turns depending on the effect of flooding.

=== Flooding ===
Before play begins, the German player must decide whether to release a flash flood or a gradual flood.

==== Flash flood ====
The flood is assumed to have rolled down the valley on 17 February. The game starts on 18 February and ends on 4 March (15 turns). During the entire game, the Roer River is considered normal, but the entire valley has been left muddy and swampy and is impassable to mechanized units except via roads.

==== Gradual flood ====
The flood can take a number of days to subside. The American player chooses when the assault will begin (from 17 to 24 February). Regardless of the start date chosen, the game will still end on 4 March, meaning the length of the game can vary from 10 turns (24 February start) to 16 turns (17 February start). Once the American player has chosen a start date, a die roll determines the force of the river on that date. The sooner the attack, the more chance that the river will be a torrent, giving the Germans a significant boost to their defense. The later the date, the more chance the river will be closer to normal.

=== Other rules ===
The rules also cover the effects of flooding and the resultant mud, air power, and the possibility of Volkssturm (civilian militia) joining the fight.

=== Victory conditions ===
The American player gains Victory Points for occupying various towns and villages, as well as for crossing an unblown Rhine bridge from west to east and staying on the east side of the Rhine. The German player wins if the American player earns 14 or fewer Victory Points. The American player wins by earning 15 or more Victory Points.

== Publication history ==
In 1978, SPI published Operation Typhoon, a board wargame that used a rules system based on 1976's Panzergruppe Guderian. SPI then used Typhoon's rule set to create a series of wargames called "Victory in the West" that simulated the last months of World War II in Europe. The first of these was Patton's 3rd Army in 1980; the second was Operation Grenade, a free pull-out game published in Strategy & Tactics No. 84 (January–February 1981) that was designed by Joseph Balkoski, with graphic design by Redmond A. Simonsen.

Hobby Japan published a Japanese edition later the same year.

SPI published a third and final game in the "Victory in the West" series, Sicily: The Race for Messina (1981) before they went out of business the following year.

In 2017, Command Japan magazine Issue 133 published a Japanese edition of Operation Grenade.

== Reception ==
In Issue 35 of Phoenix, Brendon Muldoon warned that the German player may feel disappointed to begin with, since there are so few chances to attack. But as the game developed, he thought the German player had a good chance to win. He concluded by calling it "one of the best subscription games to appear in many a long year. Operation Grenade is a delight to play and, apart from a couple of unrealistic situations likely to appear which, unfortunately, can affect the result, the game is near perfect."

In Issue 60 of Moves, Lee Enderlin complained about the rule that allowed no American mechanized units to move for the first three turns, calling it historically inaccurate and saying, "The mechanized rule appears to be an artificial add-on for the sake of play balance." He also warned that taking a bridge across the Rhine was a simple matter of luck, and the German player who had played a good defensive game would feel hard done by if the Allied player won a bridge through a random die roll. He only hoped that "the German player can still get some satisfaction from good play if Fate decides against him."

In Issue 65 of Fire & Movement, Vance Von Borries noted that too much of the gameplay hinged on the randomness of the flooding on the first turn of the game, noting, "Operation: Grenade is less successful than others of the ["Victory in the West"] series because too much of the game hinges on a few key decisions and early die rolls concerning the Roer River flood. These decisions set the tempo of the entire game." Von Borries also thought that the game was unbalanced in favour of the Americans. He concluded that "Operation: Grenade is best played as a solitaire study rather than a two player game."

In Issue 4 of Fog of War, Jean-Michel Constancias noted that from the outset, "The situation is largely unbalanced, with some Germans, very few and of average ability, trying to defend an area of the Rhineland, facing a large mass of American divisions, reinforced with tanks and artillery." However, due to the game mechanics and strong German defensive positions, Constancias concluded, "Overall the game is fast and interesting to play and fast, but it is better to play it two times by changing camps and comparing victory levels achieved."

In a retrospective review in Simulacrum, Luc Olivier noted, "The situation is mainly one-sided with some Germans trying to defend the country in front of the Rhineland. They have very few, weak troops against a large mass of US divisions reinforced with tanks and artillery. The Germans will play defensively during the entire game." Olivier suggested that playing two consecutive games with players changing sides and then comparing Victory Points was the only fair way to play this game because of the imbalance. Olivier concluded, "All in all, the game is interesting to play, changing sides and comparing victory levels. The rules are clean and the game fast."

== Other reviews and commentary ==
- American Wargamer No. 6
- Casus Belli No. 13
