= Keith Rocco =

Keith Rocco may refer to:

- Keith Rocco (painter)
- Keith Rocco (racing driver)
