= Roads to Gettysburg =

1993 American Civil War board game

- Cover art by Keith Rocco
- Designers: Joseph Balkoski
- Illustrators: Keith Rocco
- Publishers: Avalon Hill
- Publication: 1993
- Genres: American Civil War

Roads to Gettysburg is the third board wargame in the "Great Campaigns of the American Civil War" (GCACW) series, and was published by Avalon Hill in 1993. The game simulates Robert E. Lee's Confederate incursion into Pennsylvania in 1863 during the American Civil War. Unlike most other games of this genre that concentrate solely on the Battle of Gettysburg, Roads to Gettysburg follows the entire Gettysburg campaign from the time Lee crossed into Pennsylvania in June 1863 until he retreated back to Virginia following his defeat at Gettysburg. The game was well received and won an Origins Award.

== Background ==
After his victory in the Battle of Chancellorsville, Lee's Army of Northern Virginia moved north in June 1863 for a massive raid designed to obtain desperately needed supplies, to undermine civilian morale in the North, and to encourage anti-war elements. Crossing the Potomac River, Lee's Second Corps advanced through Maryland and Pennsylvania, reaching the Susquehanna River and threatening the state capital of Harrisburg. However, the Army of the Potomac under the command of George Meade was in pursuit. By happenstance more than design, the two armies met at Gettysburg on 1 July 1863.

== Description ==
Roads to Gettysburg is a board wargame for two players, one of whom controls the Confederate Army of Northern Virginia, while the other controls the Union Army of the Potomac.

The hex grid map, scaled at 1 mile (1.6 km) per hex, is made up of 22" x 32" two panels designed in the style of topographical maps of the American Civil War period.

=== Gameplay ===
The gameplay sequence is:

1. Leader Transfer Phase: Leader tokens can be transferred from one subordinate unit to another. Leaders cannot move on their own, and can only move with the units they command.
2. Action Cycle (divided into two Action Segments)
  1. Initiation Segment: Unlike many wargames that use a fixed system of alternating turns, in this game the players roll a die at during this segment to determine who will move first. (In the case of a tie, the Confederate player wins.)
  2. Action Segment: The player with the initiative can undertake an action of their own choosing, usually activating a token or formation to move it, possibly engaging in combat. Once this is resolved, play then returns to the Initiation Segment (Step 2.1) and the players again dice for initiative, the winner then moving to the Action Segment. This Action Cycle continues until either both players pass on the opportunity to take action, or both players have run out of leaders or units to activate. When that happens, play moves on to the next phase.
3. Recovery Phase: Units have the opportunity to recover from fatigue, demoralization, and disorganization, and can also dig trenches.

This is the end of one turn, representing one day of the campaign. Play returns to the top of the gameplay sequence.

=== Advanced rules ===
Advanced rules include

- Special random events that occur at various times such as the arrival of Union reinforcements, an opportunity to repair destroyed railway stations, construction of a Union depot, and Union ammunition resupply.
- Using a random events table (rolled by the Confederate player) to determine events such as torrential rains (movement slows, rivers become impassable); command problems resulting in initiative penalties; the appearance of Jeb Stuart's cavalry; the arrival of a Southern munitions train; the early end of the campaign game at the end of Turn 14.

=== Scenarios ===
The game comes with several scenarios of varying length:

- "First Day of Gettysburg": Lead elements of both sides accidentally meet at Gettysburg, precipitating the first day of battle. This is a short scenario designed to teach the rules.
- ""Where's Stuart?": Designed as a solitaire scenario, the main Confederate army tries to find and re-integrate with Jeb Stuart's cavalry.
- "Meade Moves North": The shorter of the two campaign scenarios, this one uses the historical setup of forces in Maryland and Pennsylvania on 30 June 1863 in order to simulate the events that led to the Battle of Gettysburg.
- "Confederate High Tide": This hypothetical "what-if?" scenario played on a single map (that does not include the town of Gettysburg) asks what would have happened if Lee had decided to move against the Pennsylvania capital of Harrisburg instead of meeting Meade at Gettysburg.
- "The Battle That Never Happened": Following the Battle of Gettysburg, Lee fell back to the Potomac River, flooded and impassable, and awaited the Union hammer blow that he expected would fall. However, historically, Meade failed to follow Lee, and the Confederate army successfully retreated to Virginia, prolonging the war for another two years. This "what-if?" scenario, starting on 5 July 1863, asks what would have happened if Meade had immediately followed Lee.
- "The Campaign": This long scenario covers Lee's entire campaign from the incursion into Pennsylvania on 3 June 1863.

== Publication history ==
Starting in 1992, Avalon Hill began publishing "Great Campaigns of the American Civil War" (GCACW), a series of board wargames focused on the campaigns of the American Civil War rather than the individual battles. Joseph Balkoski designed the first two, Stonewall Jackson's Way (1992) and Here Come the Rebels (1993). Balkoski also designed the third game of the series, Roads to Gettysburg, which was published by Avalon Hill in 1993 as a boxed set with cover art by Keith Rocco.

Avalon Hill would go on to publish three more games in the series: Stonewall in the Valley (1995), Stonewall's Last Battle: The Chancellorsville Campaign (1996), and On to Richmond (1998).

Starting in 2001, Multi-Man Publishing began to revise and republish the GCACW series, including the retitled Roads to Gettysburg II: Lee Strikes North (2018).

== Reception ==
In Issue 41 of the Spanish games magazine Lider, Mar Calpena commented, "Roads to Gettysburg is the third in the Great Campaigns of the American Civil War series, set in June 1863, when General Robert E. Lee, commanding the Army of Northern Virginia, entered Pennsylvania. It is a medium-complexity game, with some parts especially suited to solo play."

In Issue 9 of the French wargaming magazine Vieille Garde, Vincent Bara liked the quality of the components, especially the map, noting, "the richness of the map comes, above all, from the meticulousness with which each village, each road, but also each school, church or isolated cemetery in the countryside has been marked, as well as every important ford or river. The whole thing is simply magnificent." Bara also liked the new game system, commenting, "Such a system thus makes it possible to reproduce a semblance of simultaneity of the actions of both sides: reacting to enemy maneuvers or attempting to bluff one's opponent", although he warned, "you sometimes worry about wearing out your six-sided dice by rolling them so many times." Bara concluded, "Roads to Gettysburg is not a simulation of the Gettysburg campaign but a simulation of the Southern invasion of June 1863, whether it is limited to the occupation of Maryland or goes as far as the capture of the capital of Pennsylvania. Gettysburg, in the center of the map, plays only a very secondary role in the game and risks not seeing the decisive confrontation that historically took place there ... It is the best volume in the GCACW series to date."

== Awards ==
At the 1994 Origins Awards, Roads to Gettysburg won in the category "Best Pre-20th Century Game".

== Other reviews and commentary ==
- Fire & Movement #109 (pp. 40–42)
- Carnets de Guerre #5 (pp. 16–17, in French)
- Hexagones #12 (pp. 5–6, in French)
