= Joseph Balkoski =

American military historian

Joseph Balkoski is an American military historian and conflict simulation designer who has authored eight books on American involvement in the European Theater in World War II, including a five-volume series on the history of the 29th Infantry Division in World War II and a two-volume set on American participation in the D-Day invasion.

== Early life and education ==
Joseph Balkoski was born in New York City, the son of Itala Tomasulo Balkoski, one of the first female graduates of New York University Law School, and John Balkoski, a World War II veteran of the Pacific theater in the U.S. Army's Artillery branch. He graduated from Great Neck South Senior High School in June 1971 and later from Vassar College in 1975. He received an M.A. in history from New York University in 1976.

== Game design ==
After graduation, Balkoski was hired by Simulations Publications Inc. (SPI) in New York City, where he worked for six years. He designed fifteen games for SPI and authored several articles for SPI's military history periodical "Strategy and Tactics." He continued to design games and write articles for various companies, including Victory Games, Avalon Hill and Multi-Man Publishing.

His game designs won several Charles S. Roberts Awards and Origins Awards, and in 1989, Balkoski was inducted into the Charles Roberts Awards Hall of Fame for his lifetime achievements in the wargame design field.

== Historian ==
When Balkoski moved to Maryland in 1981, by chance he met many residents who were veterans of the D-Day invasion, all members of the 29th Infantry Division, which spearheaded the assault. His first book, Beyond the Beachhead: The 29th Infantry Division in Normandy, was published in 1988 and remains in print nearly forty years later. Balkoski's highly detailed series on the history of the 29th Division in World War II closed in 2015 with the publication of the fifth volume, The Last Roll Call, which recounts the end of the war in Europe and the GIs' return to civilian life. In 2004, Balkoski published Omaha Beach, which meticulously documented the June 6, 1944, American invasion of that pivotal Normandy objective. Two years later, he released Utah Beach, which documented the amphibious and airborne operation in Normandy's Cotentin Peninsula on D-Day.

=== Military and academia ===
Balkoski served for many years as the Command Historian of the Maryland National Guard, and founded the 29th Infantry Division Archives and Maryland Museum of Military History, both at the Fifth Regiment Armory in Baltimore, housing one of the finest collections in the United States of archival papers devoted to the World War II history of a single U.S. Army or Marine Corps division. In 2014, he designed the exhibit "When Freemen Shall Stand" at the Maryland Museum of Military History, which focused on the defense of Baltimore by Maryland citizen-soldiers in September 1814 against an attack by a British expeditionary force, an event that led to the writing of "The Star-Spangled Banner." In 2017, the 100th anniversary of American entry into World War I, he created the exhibit "Over There," portraying the life of Marylanders both overseas and on the home front during the Great War. He has served as an adjunct professor in both the history and writing departments at the University of Baltimore and the Community College of Baltimore County. He frequently conducts battlefield staff rides in the U.S. and Europe for U.S. Army soldiers as part of their military training. Balkoski currently serves on the National Executive Committee of the 29th Division Association, which formulates and executes policy in support of all 29th Division veterans and their families; and the Maryland Military Monuments Commission, which oversees hundreds of military monuments within the state. In 2023, the U.S. Army Chief of Infantry awarded him the National Infantry Association's Order of St. Maurice for his lifetime of service to American soldiers in all eras.

== Reception ==
Charles M. Schulz characterized Beyond the Beachhead: The 29th Infantry Division in Normandy, as "an amazing book... If you want to know what D-Day and Normandy were like, from private to general, from rifle to tank, from beginning to end, this is the book for you."

Rick Atkinson described Balkoski's thirty-year effort to detail the history of the 29th Division in World War II as "a magnificent achievement; the U.S. Army and the 29th Division are lucky to have an historian of Joe Balkoski's stature and skill to tell the tale of combat in Western Europe from the perspective of both the ordinary GI and his leaders."

Wall Street Journal, reviewing the two-volume set Omaha Beach and Utah Beach, described Balkoski as "a true maestro of original D-Day history."

USA Today, reviewing the same books, categorized Balkoski as "the top living D-Day historian."

Reviewing Balkoski's wargame Wacht am Rhein, Martin Campion called it "an excellent game for history and playability and gives the feel of real tactics though its rules. It is a very complex and long game but it is worth the time spent playing it." Jon Freeman agreed, calling it "perhaps the ultimate simulation of the Battle of the Bulge ... For true Bulge enthusiasts it will provide endless hours of engrossing and educational conflict."

Vincent Bara reviewed Balkoksi's wargame Roads to Gettysburg, writing, "The whole thing is simply magnificent ... It is the best volume in the Great Campaigns of the American Civil War series to date."

== Awards ==
- 2023: Order of St. Maurice (US Army Chief of Infantry/National Infantry Association)
- 2018: Distinguished Service Cross (Maryland)
- 2013: Baltimore City Historical Society Lifetime Achievement Award, Mayor's History Reception
- 2012: Secretary of the Army, Honorary Membership, 175th Infantry Regiment
- 2010: Meritorious Service Medal (Maryland)
- 2008: Secretary of the Army, Honorary Membership, 116th Infantry Regiment
- 2005: Meritorious Civilian Service Medal (Maryland)
- 2004: U.S. Army Military History Institute, Matthew B. Ridgway Research Grant
- 2004: Appointed Commissioner, Maryland Military Monuments Commission, by Governor Robert Ehrlich
- 1991: Secretary of the Army, Honorary Membership, 115th Infantry Regiment
- 1989: Charles Roberts Award, Game Design Hall of Fame

== Personal life ==
Balkoski currently resides in Maryland and has two grown daughters. He frequently plays in folk music groups in the Maryland region.

== Books ==
- Beyond the Beachhead: The 29th Infantry Division in Normandy. Harrisburg: Stackpole, 1989. ISBN 0811702219 OCLC 18222837
- The Maryland National Guard: A History of Maryland's Military Forces. Baltimore: Maryland Military Department, 1992. ISBN 096126702X OCLC 25060294
- Confederate Tide Rising -- The Antietam Campaign: Harpers Ferry, South Mountain, and Antietam Battlefield Staff Ride/Leadership Development Seminar Reference Book. Leesburg: OSS Publishing, 2001.
- Omaha Beach. Mechanicsburg: Stackpole, 2004. ISBN 0811700798 OCLC 53162877
- Utah Beach. Mechanicsburg: Stackpole, 2006. ISBN 0811701441 OCLC 57754302
- Father Eugene Patrick O'Grady: A Legendary Twenty-Niner and Baltimorean. Maryland Historical Magazine, 102 no. 1, Spring 2007.
- From Beachhead to Brittany: The 29th Infantry Division at Brest. Mechanicsburg: Stackpole, 2008. ISBN 9780811703253 OCLC 166390928
- From Brittany to the Reich: The 29th Infantry Division in Germany. Mechanicsburg: Stackpole, 2010. ISBN 9780811711685 OCLC 779262402
- Our Tortured Souls: The 29th Infantry Division in the Rhineland. Mechanicsburg: Stackpole, 2013. ISBN 9780811711692 OCLC 800040895
- The Last Roll Call: The 29th Infantry Division Victorious. Mechanicsburg: Stackpole, 2015. ISBN 081171621X

== Boardgames ==
- DMZ: The Battle for South Korea (SPI, 1977)
- Wacht am Rhein: The Battle of the Bulge, 16 Dec 44 – 2 Jan 45 (SPI, 1977 - with Jim Dunnigan and Redmond A. Simonsen). Finalist for a Charles S. Roberts Award in the category "Best Tactical Game of 1977".
- Atlantic Wall: The Invasion of Europe (SPI, 1978)
- Operation Typhoon: The German Assault on Moscow, 1941 (SPI, 1978)
- Up Scope! (SPI, 1978)
- Cityfight: Modern Combat in the Urban Environment (SPI, 1979). Charles S. Roberts Award for "Best 20th Century Game of 1979".
- Ney vs. Wellington: The Battle of Quatre Bras (SPI, 1979)
- Patton's 3rd Army (SPI, 1980)
- Operation Grenade (SPI, 1981)
- TaskForce: Naval Tactics and Operations in the 1980's (SPI, 1981)
- Sixth Fleet (Victory Games, 1985)
- 2nd Fleet: Modern Naval Combat in the North Atlantic (Victory Games, 1986)
- 7th Fleet: Modern Naval Combat in the Far East (Victory Games, 1987)
- Lee vs. Grant: The Wilderness Campaign of 1864 ( 1988). Charles S. Roberts Awards for "Best Wargaming Graphics of 1988", and "Best Pre-World War II Board Game of 1988".
- The Korean War June 1950-May 1951 (Victory Games, 1986)
- 5th Fleet: Modern Naval Combat in the Indian Ocean (Victory Games, 1989)
- Stonewall Jackson's Way (The Avalon Hill Game Co, 1992)
- Roads to Gettysburg (Avalon Hill, 1993). 1994 Origins Awards: "Best Pre-20th Century Game".
- Roads to Gettysburg II: Lee Strikes North (Multi-Man Publishing, 2018)
- On to Richmond! (The Avalon Hill Game Co, 1998)
- 3rd Fleet: Modern Naval Combat in the North Pacific, Caribbean, and Atlantic Oceans (Victory Games, 1990)
- Hood Strikes North (Multi-Man Publishing, 2020)
