= Patton's 3rd Army =

1980 WWII board wargame

- Cover of Strategy & Tactics No. 78 containing the pullout game. Art by Howard Chaykin
- Designers: Joseph Balkoski
- Illustrators: Howard Chaykin
- Publishers: Simulations Publications Inc.
- Publication: 1980
- Genres: World War II

Patton's 3rd Army, subtitled "The Lorraine Campaign", is a board wargame published by (SPI) in 1980 that simulates the Battle of Metz, a portion of the U.S. Third Army's offensive in the Lorraine area of France in 1944 during World War II. It was the first game in SPI's "Victory in the West" series.

== Background ==
After the Allied breakout from Normandy in August 1944, the U.S. Third Army under George S. Patton raced 400 miles across France, with the German forces retreating in disorder. However, a lack of gasoline for trucks and tanks forced Patton to pause before reaching the city of Metz, giving the German First Army time to set up a strong defence. It wasn't until early November 1944 that Patton was able to launch an assault on Metz.

== Description ==
Patton's 3rd Army is a two-player board wargame that simulates the assault on Metz. Two scenarios are included: a short scenario (12 turns) that covers the assault from November 8–19; and an extended version (24 turns) that continues the game through to December 1. Players can complete the short scenario before deciding whether to continue with the extended scenario.

=== Components ===
The original magazine pull-out edition includes:

- 22" x 34" hex grid map scaled at 4.2 km (2.6 mi) per hex
- 200 die-cut counters
- 8-page rule book containing rules common to all "Victory in the West" games
- 4-page rule book with rules unique to this game

=== Gameplay ===
Each game turn represents 1 day, and consists of movement and combat by one player and then the other player. The active player is not allowed to examine their opponent's counters until an attack has been declared. Combat values for infantry and tank battalions are randomly determined at the start of the unit's first combat.

=== Victory conditions ===
In both scenarios, there are three levels of victory conditions (Marginal, Substantive and Decisive). The Americans are required to isolate a specific hex, occupy or be the last to pass through certain towns and villages, and remove German units from a number of entrenched positions. The Germans win by preventing the Americans from achieving these goals.

== Publication history ==
In 1978, SPI published Operation Typhoon, a board wargame that used a rules system based on 1976's Panzergruppe Guderian. SPI used Typhoon's rule set to create a series of wargames called "Victory in the West" that simulate the last months of World War II in Europe. The first of these was Patton's 3rd Army, a free pull-out game designed by Joseph Balkoski and published in Strategy & Tactics No. 78 (January–February 1980) with graphic design by Redmond A. Simonsen and cover art by Howard Chaykin. SPI also published a boxed set edition. The game failed to make SPI's Top Ten Bestseller list following its release.

SPI continued the "Victory in the West" series in 1981 with Operation Grenade and Sicily: The Race for Messina.

A Japanese language edition of Patton's 3rd Army was published by Hobby Japan in 1980. Another Japanese-language edition (パットン第3軍) was published in Command Japan magazine (シミュレーションゲーム コマンドマガジン) Vol. 81 in 2008 with artwork by Sawshun Yamaguchi.

== Reception ==
In Issue 35 of Phoenix, Brendon Muldoon warned that "the German defends grimly throughout most game turns with little expectancy of even a modicum of light relief — a situation not to everyone's taste." He found the rules regarding weather "irritating", but admitted that "if you wish to go to war around Metz in November, it is unlikely you will suffer casualties from sunstroke." He found the short game to be unbalanced against the Americans, calling victory "a difficult proposition." And he thought overall that the game was "somewhat boring" for the German player, who is limited to a defensive role with little chance of counterattack.

In Issue 4 of Frog of War, Jean-Michel Constancias warned that due to the strong defensive position of the Germans, "the rhythm of the game can be extremely frustrating for Patton's tank commanders." He concluded "Overall the game is perfectly playable, and fast, but it is better to play it twice with players changing camps."

In a retrospective review in Simulacrum, Luc Olivier noted, "The German side will see the initial attack creeping over the rough terrain as the US support points drop. Later panzer reinforcements will help avoid a major German disaster ... The US side will see a painful first part trying to go through the first entrenched line, but after, it is a free for all, rushing for victory points as the poor German soldiers rush all around." Olivier concluded, "All in all, the game is very playable, fast to play but better to play twice, switching sides. Warning: the pace of the game can be frustrating for cavalry/panzer/tank men like Patton."

== Other reviews ==
- Fire & Movement No. 65
- Grenadier No. 13
- Paper Wars No. 8
- Casus Belli No. 13
