= Cityfight =

Cityfight may refer to:

- Cityfight: Modern Combat in the Urban Environment, a 1979 board game
- Codex Battlezone: Cityfight, a Warhammer 40,000 supplement

== See also ==
- Urban warfare
