= TaskForce: Naval Tactics and Operations in the 1980's =

1981 naval combat board game

TaskForce
- Designers: Joseph Balkoski
- Illustrators: Redmond A. Simonsen
- Publishers: Simulations Publications Inc.
- Publication: 1981
- Genres: Modern naval

TaskForce: Naval Tactics and Operations in the 1980's is a board wargame published by Simulations Publications Inc. (SPI) in 1981 that simulates naval combat using weaponry and tactics of the late 1970s.

== Description ==
TaskForce is a naval combat board wargame for two players that uses a "limited intelligence" hidden movement system to ensure that neither player is aware of the location, strength or composition of the other player's naval task force. The game uses ships, submarines, armament and tactics of the late 1970s, when the game was designed.

Two sets of three maps are provided — one set for each player — showing the Mediterranean Sea, the Caribbean Sea (used for actions involving Cuba), and the Iceland-Faroe Islands Strait.

=== Gameplay ===
Unlike the usual "I Go, You Go" game system where players alternate taking turns, this game uses a hidden movement system using a map for each player, so both players participate in every phase of each turn:

1. Random Events: This results in command issues common to both sides, as well as the placement of squalls, which will hamper searches and aircraft flights.
2. Air Operations: Both players send search aircraft forth, trying to discover the location of the other player's task force.
3. Action: Each player rolls a die and adds the result to the strength of their leader to calculate Action Points. These are used to perform actions such as moving ships, conducting Anti-Submarine Warfare (ASW), gunnery (conducted on a smaller Tactical map), firing surface-to-surface missiles or torpedoes, and conducting air strikes.

=== Combat ===
In the case of firing surface-to-surface missiles, torpedoes, and conducting air strikes, no Combat Results Table (CRT) is used. Instead, the attacking player compares a die roll to the defensive factor of the target to resolve success.

=== Scenarios ===
Several scenarios are included with the game including two Introductory scenarios, two Basic scenarios, four Intermediate scenarios, and five Tournament scenarios. There are also instructions for how to design a scenario.

== Publication history ==
Joseph Balkoski designed TaskForce, which was published by SPI in 1981 as a boxed set with graphic design by Redmond A. Simonsen.

== Reception ==
In Issue 50 of the British magazine Perfidious Albion, Charles Vasey commented, "Actual play is swift and pretty painless, although a quick-reference sheet would have been useful for all the various additions ... but it was all there in the specific section [of the rulebook] so this is no great complaint." Vasey liked the flexibility of the game, noting, "The range of ships is excellent with everything from Soviet carriers to Israeli missile boats." However, Vasey questioned some of the suppositions of the game, pointing out "We found that the American carriers lacked sufficient ECM and flak to stop their destruction by missiles." Vasey concluded, "In all good fun, demanding, and thought provoking. It beats the hell out of Sixth Fleet [SPI, 1975]. Recommended."

In Issue 31 of The Wargamer, although Donald Mack found, "Play is smooth and features much interaction between players", he noted the absence of certain elements of (late 1970s) naval doctrine, pointing out, "However Task Force has some notable omissions as a simulation, e.g. the near-total absence of Soviet land-based aircraft and the role of the ship-borne helicopter as a major ASW weapon." Despite this, Mack found that " Task Force is a much easier game to play than it may seem on one's first opening the box. The sequence is soon mastered through the use of the basic scenarios and progress to the all stops-out Tournament scenarios plus all optional rules is smooth and without hiccups. The various forms of combat lend themselves to solo practice and this will further speed the prоcess of becoming familiar with the game." Mack liked the hidden movement system, noting, "There can be some tense games of maritime hide-and-seek, especially in scenarios with little or no airpower; the suspected presence of an undetected enemy group can keep players on the edges of their chairs and the process of systematic searching is both interesting and full of opportunities for bluff and second-guessing." Mack concluded, "Although Task Force has holes in its system most of which could have been filled up before publication, it is nonetheless a good and interesting game, combining a workable search procedure which conveys something of the wide, wide sea and which does not result in the searcher's betraying his own location, with swift, hair-raising combats depicting well the long-range strikes of modem naval warfare."

== Other reviews and commentary ==
- Richard Berg's Review of Games #18
- Adventure Gaming #2
- Simulations Canada Newsletter #4
- Wargame News #42
- Fire & Movement #27
- Strategy & Tactics #83
- Moves #57
