= Sixth Fleet: Modern Naval Combat in the Mediterranean =

Naval wargame

Sixth Fleet
- Designers: Joseph Balkoski
- Illustrators: Ted Koller; James Talbot
- Publishers: Victory Games
- Publication: 1985
- Genres: Naval

Sixth Fleet, subtitled "Modern Naval Combat in the Mediterranean", is a naval wargame published by Victory Games in 1985 that simulates near-future naval combat using technology, equipment and global politics from the mid-1980s.

== Description ==
Sixth Fleet is a naval wargame for two players in which one player controls American naval forces while the other player controls Soviet forces in hypothetical combat scenarios in the Mediterranean Sea.

=== Components ===
The game box includes two 22" x 32" hex grid mapsheets scaled at 50 nautical miles (93 km) per hex, over 600 double-sided counters — each representing one ship or submarine, or a squadron of aircraft — a rulebook, two pads for tracking logistical information (ammunition, fuel), and several player aids.

=== Scenarios ===
Fourteen scenarios are supplied:

- Introductory (1 hr each): A typical scenario pits four Soviet submarines against two American subs.
- Intermediate (3 to 6 hours): Typically an American carrier task force against a variety of Soviet and allied units.
- Advanced (20 or more hours): These introduce transports and abstract land forces, with the emphasis on keeping the land forces adequately supplied.

=== Gameplay ===
Unlike other naval games that use limited intelligence rules, where enemy ships do not appear on the board until they have been detected, this game allows all ships to be visible on the map, but they cannot be attacked until the opposing player has spotted them via aerial reconnaissance, automatic detection if within range of ships with detection capability, or the enemy ships attack.

All units are classified as Air, Surface, and Submarine. During a turn, the first player — chosen randomly — selects one of the three types — for example, Air — and then moves and attacks with any or all of that type. Play then switches to the other player, who also chooses one of the three types and moves or attacks with them. It then reverts to the first player, who chooses one of their two remaining types of units. Play continues to alternate until both players have used all three types of units.

=== Combat ===
Depending on the unit being attacked, the defender may be able to make a die roll based on defensive factors. The attacker then rolls a die, and subtracts the defender's die roll from the attacking die roll. If final result is more than half of the defending unit's defensive value, the target is damaged. If the result is equal to or greater than the unit's defensive value, the target has been sunk.

An optional rule allows for tactical nuclear weapons.

== Publication history ==
In 1983, TSR abruptly took over wargame publisher Simulations Publications Inc. (SPI) and halted all SPI game development in progress. In response, most SPI game designers resigned and moved to rival company Avalon Hill, lured by the formation of a subsidiary specifically for them called Victory Games. One of these was Joseph Balkoski, who subsequently designed Sixth Fleet, which was published by Victory Games in 1985. It was the first in Balkoski's "Fleet Series"; he would create another four navel games (2nd Fleet, 7th Fleet, 5th Fleet, and 3rd Fleet) that used the same rules system Balkoski had developed for Sixth Fleet.

In 1991, Avalon Hill published a Sixth Fleet expansion titled Some Submarine Second-Guessing.

== Reception ==
In Issue 21 of the Australian game magazine Breakout!, Nigel Slater liked the quality of the components, noting "The components are up to VG's high standards." Slater noted that it took over an hour just to read the rules, "but there are many examples and simple repetition to ensure clarity. They can be taught to somebody else in about ten minutes. This is one area in which the game really shines." Slater also liked the simplicity of the game mechanics, pointing out, "Game basics are extremely simple yet elegant. Similar concepts are used in the wide variety of combat types covered - and because of the simple procedures, only a single six-sided die is required for combat resolution." Slater concluded, "for sheer playability and enjoyment on the subject of modern naval combat, Sixth Fleet clearly comes out the winner. As a game in its own night, even if, like me, you are not a naval buff there is plenty to interest you here."

In the inaugural edition of the British game magazine Games International, Mike Siggins commented, "This game has come in for some stick [put-downs] from some self-styled experts, but for me it represents a clean, stylish, design which covers the complexities of modern naval warfare superbly well. The game system ensures that decision making is not affected by the rules and just allows players to get on with it." Siggins concluded, "Given the time to play, the campaign game would be marvellous."

In Issue 26 of the French games magazine Casus Belli, Frank Stora pointed out with some dismay, "While the rules are clear, the double-sided counters are packed with information — no fewer than eleven data points that indicate nationality, name, type, movement, durability, range and strength of surface-to-surface missiles, gun values, short- and long-range anti-aircraft values, and anti-submarine capability." Despite this, Stora concluded that this was "a fascinating game — though obviously one geared toward enthusiasts of hypothetical warfare." Twenty issues later, Hervé Hat noted, "the charm of Sixth Fleet is its landscape, populated by a myriad of fickle and troublesome nations. From France — with its aircraft carrier Foch, its escort, and its submarines — to Libya — with a few naval vessels and, above all, numerous aircraft — the range of options is comprehensive; certainly sufficient for American allies to switch sides during a game, or even withdraw while it is in progress." However, Hat found a few flaws: Determining air superiority is too random; detection of enemy vessels, including submarines, is too easy; no land-based defenses against aircraft incursions; and the inability of Soviet submarines to damage large American ships. Hat concluded, "Sixth Fleet, due to the fragmented nature of the theater it represents, struggles to simulate the crisis situations that are, in fact, likely to occur. It simulates only 'open' conflicts where the enemy is clearly defined, error is impossible, and 'friendly fire' incidents are unthinkable. We must open our eyes and acknowledge that while 'low-intensity conflict', 'crisis situations', and 'constant tension' are replacing many traditional conflicts of the past and becoming the standard operating environment for naval forces, Sixth Fleet does not simulates this. This is, in fact, the fundamental limitation of contemporary wargaming. And it is a massive one."

== Reviews ==
- Game News #6 (Aug., 1985)
