= Lee vs. Grant: The Wilderness Campaign of 1864 =

War game

Lee vs. Grant: The Wilderness Campaign of 1864 is a board game published by Victory Games in 1988 that simulates a campaign of the American Civil War. It earned two Charles S. Roberts Awards and would become the first of a series of games known as the Great Campaigns of the American Civil War.

== Contents ==
Lee vs. Grant is a two-player strategic board wargame that simulates the pivotal 1864 Wilderness Campaign at the divisional level.

=== Historical background ===
In May 1864, Lt. General Ulysses S. Grant attempted to force a quick end to the American Civil War by marching the Army of the Potomac towards the Confederate capital of Richmond, Virginia. Confederater General Robert E. Lee interposed the Army of Northern Virginia, and the two armies fought a series of battles over the next eight weeks.

=== Components ===
The game box contains:

- hex grid map of the area between Fredericksburg and Petersburg, scaled at 1:200,000, with each hex representing two miles (3.2 km).
- 520 die cut counters
- charts
- counter tray
- rulebook

=== Gameplay ===
The game is split into

- a Basic game of six scenarios that introduces the players to movement and unit activitation;
- three Advanced scenarios that add sea movement, supply and more leader rules
- several Campaign scenarios

== Publication history ==
Lee vs. Grant was designed by Joseph Balkoski, with artwork by Rosaria Baldari and Ted Koller, and was published in 1988 by Victory Games, an imprint of Avalon Hill. Using a revision of Lee vs. Grant's rules system, Balkoski would go on to design five games in what became known as the Great Campaigns of the American Civil War (GCACW) series, which were published by Avalon Hill from 1992–1998.

== Reception ==
In the inaugural issue of Games International, Mike Siggins stated that he enjoyed this game, saying, "I like Lee vs. Grant. Some of the game system may be a trifle unusual, but overall it is a fresh, vital treatment of an area that has formerly held little interest for me." He concluded by giving the game a perfect rating of 5 stars out of 5.

In John K. Setear's 1989 paper for Rand Corporation, Simulating the Fog of War, he cited Lee vs. Grant as an example of a game that uses game mechanics to make each game turn an unpredictable length, negating the ability of players to formulate exact strategies. Setear noted that Lee vs. Grant "takes the technique to one extreme, in which every unit's movement allowance is determined by [...] a die roll (combined with the get-up-and-go rating of its commander.)"

Games listed Lee vs. Grant in its "Top Games of 1988", saying, "Forced marches, routs, the burning of railroad stations, and the effectiveness of leaders all help determine the outcome of this bloody campaign."

== Awards ==
At the 1989 Origins Game Fair, Lee vs. Grant won Charles S. Roberts Awards in two categories: "Best Wargaming Graphics of 1988", and "Best Pre-World War II Board Game of 1988".
