= Wellington's Victory: Battle of Waterloo – 18 June 1815 =

Board game

Original SPI edition, 1976

Wellington's Victory: Battle of Waterloo – 18 June 1815 is a board wargame simulation of the Battle of Waterloo, originally published by Simulations Publications, Inc. (SPI) in 1976.

== Description ==
This is two-person or three-person tabletop game — either one person can take on the French while the other takes both the Anglo-Allied forces and the Prussians, or the Anglo-Allied and Prussian forces can be divided between two players. Characterized as a "monster game" because of its large number of counters, this is a battalion-level simulation focusing on the Battle of Waterloo, with a 68" x 44" map of the seven-mile battle front (100 yards per hex), and 2000 counters. Rules are included to allow for battle formation tactics, skirmishers, and artillerists.

=== Components ===
The components in the original SPI and TSR boxed sets are:

- rulebook, which includes a pullout sheet with deployment charts
- 5 sheets of counters totalling 2000 die-cut counters representing French, Anglo-Allied and Prussian units
- 2 Combat Strength Marker Sheets
- a 68" x 44" paper hex map in four sections
- 1 plastic six-sided die
- 2 plastic trays for holding counters

In Decision Games' redesigned 2014 edition, the box holds:

- 32-page rulebook
- 16-page Color Battle Analysis
- counter Sheets holding 1,960 die-cut counters
- 4 34" x 22" soft maps
- 2 Player Aid Sheets
- 1 Time Display Sheet
- 3 Army Display Sheets
- 1 Prussian Off-Board Approach Sheet
- 6 six-sided Dice
- Counter storage bags

== Publication history ==
Wellington's Victory was originally designed by Frank Davis and published by SPI in 1976 in a flat box. After TSR took over SPI in 1982, Wellington's Victory was re-issued under the TSR trademark in a standard-sized "bookcase" box. In 2015, Decision Games acquired the rights to Wellington's Victory, and published a streamlined game redesigned by Chris Perello.

A smaller prequel game, using the same game system, Ney vs. Wellington: The Battle of Quatre Bras, was published in 1979.

== Reception ==
In Issue 17 of the British wargaming magazine Perfidious Albion, Steve Clifford liked the quality of the components, noting, "Physically, the game leaves little to be desired." However, Clifford didn't like that none of the shorter scenarios could be played on a single map, and also noted that the shortest of the scenarios was still twenty turns long, a sizable investment in time. Despite this, Clifford concluded, "By and large, though of course there are many faults ... WV has much to interest the Napoleonic gamer, especially those who began with miniatures." In the same issue, Charles Vasey and Geoffrey Barnard discussed the game. Vasey noted, "There is much of value in this game but considering its audience (the dedicated buff) I feel it fails to approach the standard of realism or finish required. The feel is wrong and loop-holes are prevalent, although the rules are dense and not very well laid out, so this may have hidden many answers from me." Barnard replied, "I found this a very interesting game, in spite of its problems, and in spite of it being hard work. The sequence of play is difficult to grasp; this factor, coupled with the complexity of Napoleonic tactics, means you must give long and careful study to any maneoeuvre you attempt." Vasey concluded, "This is an inferior piece of work compared to Terrible Swift Sword and can only be regarded as marginally better than Torgau." Barnard concluded, "Overall, a good game for Napoleonic fans, but only if you are prepared to take a lot of trouble over both playing, and possibly adding to/amending, the game." In Issue 22, Alain London found this to be a "faithful recreation" of the battle, but disliked the amount of dice-rolling required. London concluded, "if you like large games, you should enjoy this one."

In his 1977 book The Comprehensive Guide to Board Wargaming, Nicholas Palmer noted the extremely detailed map, pointing out the game had "1600 counters, and a mere hundred yards per hex." Palmer concluded "Movement [is] mostly in brigade-sized columns, fortunately for playability, but it's still an imposing game."

In Issue 14 of Imagine, Peter O'Toole reviewed the TSR edition, and liked the rules on firing factors, formations, unit effectiveness and cavalry charges. But he was dubious about skirmishers, and thought TSR's change of artwork on the cover was "terrible". Despite these quibbles, O'Toole concluded with a strong recommendation, saying, "Despite minor flaws the game is a classic. You feel the pressure the commanders felt. As Wellington you look on your thinning ranks and can honestly wish that God will 'Give me night or give me Blucher'."

In Issue 53 of Moves, Ian Chadwick warned that "its very size and complexity demand serious commitment and concentration of effort." He concluded, "A few words cannot begin to convey the excitement, the pleasure, nor the trials of playing this game", and gave it a "B+" for playability, an "A" for historical accuracy, and a "A" for component quality.

In Issue 33 of the French games magazine Casus Belli, Yves Jourdain, gave an exhaustive examination of the game and its rules, before concluding that although the campaign game was likely out of reach of most gamers due to its length and complexity, "Given the presence of intermediate scenarios ... the game's quality/price ratio, and finally, the good balance of complexity-size-number of counters, get this simulation without hesitation."

Paul Comben found several weaknesses in the rules concerning cavalry charges, found several historical errors in the setup, and questioned the lack of a system to simulate desertions during the battle. But overall, he felt the game provided an adequate if not a stimulating simulation, saying, "Where the SPI system shows at its strongest is, as I have said, in the function of this arm and that arm, the timing of correct deployment, and the advantages of good morale. But it remains process more than anything else."

== Awards ==
At the 1977 Origins Awards, Wellington's Victory was a finalist in two categories for Charles S. Roberts Awards:

- Best Tactical Game of 1976
- Best Graphics & Physical Systems of 1976

== Other reviews and commentary ==
- Strategy & Tactics, Issue 60 (Jan/Feb 1977)
- Fire & Movement, Issue 6 (March/April 1977)
- Moves, Issue 34 (August/September 1977)
- Perfidious Albion #21 (October 1977) p.16-17
