= Up Scope! =

1978 WWII board wargame

- Designers: Joseph Balkoski
- Illustrators: Redmond A. Simonsen
- Publishers: Simulations Publications Inc.
- Publication: 1978
- Genres: World War II

Up Scope!, subtitled "Tactical Submarine Warfare in the 20th Century", is a highly complex naval board wargame published by Simulations Publications Inc. (SPI) in 1978 that simulates submarine warfare during World War I, World War II, and the mid-20th century Cold War.

== Description ==
Up Scope! is a game for two players, one controlling one or more submarines and the other controlling surface ships.

=== Gameplay ===
Up Scope! uses a hidden movement system, so neither side knows where the other is until one side or the other makes contact. For this purpose, both players have a separate map on which they track their own vessels.

The sequence of play is:

1. Command Phase: Both players secretly determine movement and search operations for the coming turn, as well as some combat decisions — at what depth will depth charges explode, what type of torpedo will be fired, etc. Both players then move their vessels according to their written plans.
2. Combat Phase: The Escort (surface vessel) player executes all combat, followed by the Submarine player.
3. Search Phase: Both players can use applicable search methods — radar, sonar, hydraphone — to find the enemy.
4. Terminal Phase: Turn markers are updated, reinforcements appear, victory conditions are checked.

=== Scenarios ===
The game comes with many scenarios:

- World War I: Three scenarios
- World War II:
  - Five scenarios set in the Pacific Theater
  - Three scenarios set in the Mediterranean Theater
  - Five scenarios set in the Battle of the Atlantic
- Contemporary (Mid-1970s Cold War): Three scenarios

== Publication history ==
Up Scope! was designed by Joseph Balkoski, and was published by SPI in 1978 as a boxed set. Pre-publication interest in the game was high, and four months before Up Scope! was released, advance sales had already brought the game to #8 on SPI's Top Ten Bestseller List. After publication, the game would stay on the Top Ten List for another four months.

== Reception ==
Two reviews appeared in Issue 14 of the British wargaming magazine Phoenix. In the first, Tony Jones warned that "My main initial reservations fall under two main headings: one is playability for a limited market, which naval games attract, and the other is the scope (no pun intended) of the game." Jones questioned whether there was enough audience for a naval game, and suggested that players new to submarine games would likely turn to Battleline's considerably less complex 1976 game Submarine, noting "[Submarine] is much easier to play and (dare I say it) more fun than Up Scope. Up Scope is a much more accurate portrayal of submarine warfare but, due to its complexity, lacks as a game due to being much longer to play." Jones also wished that the game had simply concentrated on the World War II scenarios, pointing out that "Trying to cram the whole development of submarine warfare, which has undergone as many changes as the development of the aircraft scene, into one rules book, gives us a very disjointed and hard to follow set of instructions ... Had the game left out the contemporary era, a more understandable and easier to refer to set of rules could have been produced." Jones concluded that it might become popular with naval gaming enthusiasts but "for the casual naval gamer it may seem a bit heavy and quite long in playing time until one is fully familiar with the rules not an easy task."

In the second review, Bob Aldridge criticized the research that had gone into the game, saying, "Hand in hand with realism goes technical detail and in this respect the game has not matched the standard set by the game system. It is fairly easy to show that someone, somewhere, has gone badly astray when it comes to collecting and presenting the vital information upon which the game relies." Aldridge then proceeded to analyze one group of data in one of twenty-seven tables of information, specifically data on British submarines of the 20th century. Aldridge was able to point out many errors in the relatively small sample of data, and concluded, "We have looked at one group out of one table. The remaining groups [in the same table] are not faultless either. As for the other twenty-six tables, who can say? To be fair to SPI, to compile tables giving complete information about every class and every variation within that class would be an impossible task. However, surely it was possible to ensure that where information was given, it was right."

In The Guide to Simulations/Games for Education and Training, Martin Campion noted, "The simulation of submarine/destroyer tactics and weapons is executed in some detail" and warned "The game is quite complex and, unlike many complex games, should not be played at all by players who do not know the game." Campion thought the game could be adapted to the classroom, noting, "the rules makes sense because they correspond to reality, and it is easy to adapt the game to several players."
