= Operation Typhoon: The German Assault on Moscow, 1941 =

1978 WWII board wargame

Operation Typhoon
- Designers: Joseph Balkoski; Joe Angiolilo
- Illustrators: Redmond A. Simonsen
- Publishers: Simulations Publications Inc.
- Publication: 1978
- Genres: World War II

Operation Typhoon: The German Assault on Moscow, 1941 is a board wargame published by Simulations Publications Inc. (SPI) in 1978 that simulates the German attempt to capture Moscow during World War II.

== Background ==
On 22 June 1941, less than two years after signing the non-aggression Molotov–Ribbentrop Pact with the Soviet Union, Germany attacked the Soviets across a wide front, with several strategic goals in mind. One of them, the capture of Moscow, enjoyed promising initial gains, but slowly ground to a halt as the Soviets responded by quickly constructing three defensive belts, while throwing armies in front of Moscow created from newly raised reserve forces and troops from the Siberian and Far Eastern Military Districts. Believing that the Soviets must be close to collapse, Hitler and his generals decided on one last throw of the dice, code-named Operation Typhoon. Launched on 17 November 1941, Typhoon involved two pincer offensives, one to the north of Moscow by the 3rd and 4th Panzer Armies, and another to the south of Moscow Oblast by the 2nd Panzer Army, while the 4th Army advanced directly towards Moscow from the west.

== Description ==
Operation Typhoon is a game for two players, one controlling Soviet forces and the other controlling German forces. The game is large and complex, with 800 counters and three 22" x 34" hex grid maps scaled at 2.7 miles (4.3 km) per hex.

=== Gameplay ===
The game is based on the system developed for SPI's 1977 game Wacht am Rhein, and allows the German side to start each game turn with the following sequence:

1. Weather and ground determination phase
2. German support allocation (Every fourth game turn, the German player must randonly determine how many corps in each army can be supplied.)
3. Mutual supply determination phase
4. Movement phase
5. Combat phase
6. Interdiction phase

The Soviets then have the same opportunities, with the exception of the support allocation phase. This completes one game turn, which represents one day of the battle.

To simulate the fog of war and the variable quality of Soviet divisions in 1941, neither the Soviet or the German player knows exactly what the strength of each Soviet unit is until it is drawn at random.

Various rules cover the worsening weather, operational support, limited intelligence, air power, supply, unit morale, German divisional integrity, and Russian entrenchments. Optional rules allow for the Germans to move into a "hedgehog" formation; Soviet ski troops; and German support.

=== Scenarios ===
There are four scenarios included with the game. The first three are all shorter scenarios only involving one sector of the battle using one map. These all start on 15 November and end on 30 November (16 turns). The fourth scenario covers the entire battle, uses all three maps and all counters, and runs from 15 November to 15 December (31 turns).

=== Victory conditions ===
Before the game begins, the German player must choose one of three objectives; the choice is not revealed to the Soviet player until the end of the game.:

1. Direct assault on Moscow (the historical objective)
2. Encirclement of Moscow
3. General eastward push

Each objective has its own victory conditions; attaining these results in a German victory. If the Soviets prevent the victory conditions from being fulfilled, the Soviet player wins.

== Publication history ==
Operation Typhoon was created by Joe Angiolilo and Joseph Balkoski, and was published as a boxed set by SPI with graphic design by Redmond A. Simonsen. When the game was released in the fall of 1978, it entered SPI's Top Ten Bestseller List at #2, and two months later rose to #1.

Ten years later, Hobby Japan acquired the game license and published a Japanese language version. In 2023, Kokusai-Tsushin Co., Ltd. (国際通信社) also published a Japanese version. In 2024, Decision Games re-published the original SPI game.

== Reception ==
In Issue 19 of the British wargaming magazine Phoenix, Brian Laidlaw was not pleased with the rules concerning winter weather, pointing out "[In this game], it is possible in mid November to have days of snow which will disappear overnight and from the beginning of December rivers are liable to freeze and then flow quite freely from day to day. Now I'm no meteorologist but this looks odd to me. We're not talking about your Berkshire Christmas card type winter here but undiluted Arctic conditions which could and did freeze men solid." However, Laidlaw found the supply rules quite good, commenting, "They are well integrated into the system." Laidlaw concluded, "Undoubtedly the game will sell well containing as it does the wonder ingredient - tanks on the Russian front, but it also deserves recognition in its own right as a 'clean' manageable and often fascinating game with a wealth of strategic alternatives. There are few games one could recommend unreservedly and this certainly isn't one of them but if you enjoy Operational level simulations and the subject appeals to you then I think you'll find Typhoon is a very good buy."

In Craft, Model, and Hobby Industry, Rick Mataka warned, "Operation Typhoon ... should only be recommended to experienced gamers because of its size and complexity of play."

In Issue 50 of Moves, Steve List commented, "Despite the presence of three German Panzer Gruppen, this game is somewhat in favor of the Soviet. Most of the terrain is heavily wooded, to armor's detriment. The Germans are hampered by weather and by their supply situation." List concluded by giving the game a grade of B+, noting, "The game is a challenge to both players, but especially the German."

In a retrospective review in Issue 14 of the wargaming magazine Simulacrum, Luc Olivier commented "OT emerges directly from the good old era when games were big and beautiful ...In spite of its sheer size, OT is very playable ... A team of two players per side can manage the Campaign Game in less than a weekend. The whole game is hard to win for the German and very dependant on the chits picked for combat: some good or bad defensive values of the initial or last Russian line can ruin or save the German day. But in all cases, the game will be tense for both sides."

== Other reviews and commentary ==
- Fire & Movement #15 and #63
- Science & Vie #31 (in French)
- Le Journal de Strategie #53 and #54 (in French)
