= Ney vs. Wellington: The Battle of Quatre Bras =

1979 Napoleonic board wargame

The cover of Strategy & Tactics #74, which contained Ney vs. Wellington. Cover art is a black & white reproduction of "The 28th Regiment at Quatre Bras" by Elizabeth Thompson (1875)

Ney vs. Wellington: The Battle of Quatre Bras is a board wargame published by Simulations Publications Inc. (SPI) in 1979 that simulates the Battle of Quatre Bras.

== Background ==
In 1815, the exiled Napoleon returned to Paris and quickly raised an army. Faced with a coalition of British and Prussian armies gathering in Belgium, Napoleon speedily marched towards them, trying to fight and defeat the two armies individually rather than allowing them to join.

On 16 June 1815, while Napoleon was battling the Prussians at Ligny, he ordered Marshal Ney to find and destroy the British under the Duke of Wellington. Wellington and a few troops had moved to the village of Quatre Bras, and had Ney immediately attacked, he might have dealt the British a decisive blow. As it was, Ney did not attack until 2:30 pm, allowing more British troops to move up and reinforce the units at Quatre Bras. Although the British were ultimately forced to retreat, they did so in good order and with few casualties, allowing them to reform and fight Napoleon at the Battle of Waterloo two days later.

== Description ==
Ney vs. Wellington is a two-player board wargame where one player controls the Anglo-Allied forces under the Duke of Wellington and the other player controls the French forces under Marshal Ney.

The game uses the complex asymmetrical game system developed for SPI's 1976 monster Napoleonic wargame Wellington's Victory. Although Ney vs. Wellington is a small game with only 255 counters — of which just 70 are the actual army units of both sides — the game has been characterized as "monstrously complicated".

=== Gameplay ===
Although each unit has a strength rating, critic Jon Freeman noted, "Firing strength and effectiveness ratings are far more important than unit strengths." As with other Napoleonic games, provision is made for changing a unit's formation (line, skirmish or square), which can have an effect on both attack and defensive efficiency.

The game uses "step reduction" for damage: After a unit takes its first hit of damage, its counter is replaced by an identical unit counter with a slash across it. If the unit takes a second hit, it is eliminated. Several critics did not like the double-counter system, and later games with step reduction used double-sided counters, with the damaged unit graphic on the reverse side, rather than a system of two counters for each unit.

Morale plays an important part in the battle, and the presence of leader counters can play a large role in maintaining morale.

Rather than the standard "I Go, You Go" move/attack system used by most wargames in the 1970s, Ney vs. Wellington uses a complex and asymmetrical series of phases:

1. French Cavalry Charge
2. French Rally
3. Allied Facing and Formation
4. Allied March
5. French Shock Attack
6. Reciprocal Artillery
7. Reciprocal Infantry Fire
8. Allied Cavalry Charge
9. Allied Rally
10. French Facing and Formation
11. French March
12. Allied Shock Attack

This completes one game turn. The game ends after twenty turns.

== Victory conditions ==
The victory conditions depend on whether either side is demoralized, and how many French units, if any, were able to move forward past Namur Road.

== Publication history ==
In 1976, SPI published the large and complex Napoleonic game Wellington's Victory, designed by Frank Davis, which simulated the Battle of Waterloo. Three years later, Joseph Balkoski used the complex rules to design a much smaller game, Ney vs. Wellington, which was published with graphic design by Redmond A. Simonsen as a free pull-out game in Issue 74 of SPI's house magazine Strategy & Tactics. The game was also released as a boxed set, using as cover art the 1875 painting "The 28th Regiment at Quatre Bras" by Elizabeth Thompson (also known as Lady Butler).

Although critical reception was generally good, the game did not find an audience and failed to crack SPI's Top Ten Bestselling Games List.

== Reception ==
In the 1980 book The Complete Book of Wargames, game designer Jon Freeman warned that "the sequence of play may well be initially confusing. The vast importance of effectiveness ratings — as opposed to actual combat strengths —can also be a source of dismay for gamers who are less accustomed to the peculiarities of some modern Napoleonic simulations." Freeman also noted that line of sight calculations, designed in the days before handheld calculators, "requires division to two or more decimal places." Freeman was also critical of the step reduction system of two counters for every unit, "which can be annoying." Despite these issues, Freeman gave the game an Overall Rating of "Fair to Good", concluding, "Despite these shortcomings, Ney vs. Wellington is a fine simulation: detailed, challenging, and educational."

In his 1980 book The Best of Board Wargaming, Nicky Palmer noted that "Ney vs. Wellington shifts the game system of the giant Wellington's Victory from Waterloo as a whole to the preliminary skirmish at Quatre Bras. Thus [it is a very complex ordinary-sized game] with a small map, limited unit counters, and a reasonably short duration. In fact, most people would not think of the smaller games as monsters at all, yet from the complexity point of view, they are very close to their big brothers, that is monstrously complicated."

Critic John Scarbeck found the game unbalanced against the French, saying, "Ney vs. Wellington is such an accurate historical simulation that, with an opponent of nearly equal ability, the French player stands little chance of winning a decisive or even substantive victory."

In Issue 53 of Moves, Ian Chadwick suggested the game could have benefited from "what if?" scenarios either allowing the French to attack earlier in the day, before the Allies had time to prepare their lines, or adding the arrival of French reinforcements, saying, "Admittedly, both options swing the balance of the game heavily toward the French, but the game as it now stands is tough, almost impossible for a French victory above a marginal level." Chadwick also note the complexity of the rules, commenting, "Although technically an accurate and excellent game, it's not much for playability. The Allies have too little to do and too little to worry about, while the French have few options except a swift unsubtle attack." Chadwick concluded by giving the game a grade of "B" for component quality, "B" for playability and "A" for historical accuracy, saying, "To make this game superb all around, far more is needed to go into scenario creation to allow some flexibility. It still remains interesting and fans of [Wellington's Victory] will find it easy to digest, but not much fun."

In a retrospective review written 35 years after the game's publication, Paul Comben found the line of sight rules annoying, saying, "LoS rules are long, complex, and rather off-putting. In seeking to present series maps of rolling contours and gradients, the LoS aspect of the rules ended up being filled with bits of mathematical equation more at home in a college textbook." Comben also had issues with the victory conditions, which he found too straightforward in terms of geographical placement at the end of the battle, saying, "These are not silly conditions for evaluating a victor, but they do rather miss what Quatre Bras was about. And what it was about in a subtle sense, at one particular level that might be missed by players and students, was demonstrating how far Napoleon’s command of things was slipping away." Feeling that the game had missed the subtleties of the battle, Comben concluded, "Where the SPI system shows at its strongest is, as I have said, in the function of this arm and that arm, the timing of correct deployment, and the advantages of good morale. But it remains process more than anything else."

== Other reviews and commentary ==
- The Wargamer Vol.1 #12
- Fire & Movement #24
- Wargamer News # 13 & #49
- Line of Order #30
- Campaign #94
