= Cityfight: Modern Combat in the Urban Environment =

1979 board game

Box cover graphic art by Redmond A. Simonsen, 1979

Cityfight: Modern Combat in the Urban Environment is a board game published by Simulations Publications (SPI) in 1979.

== Description ==
Cityfight: Modern Combat in the Urban Environment is a two-player wargame that depicts urban combat post-World War II. Published before the Fall of the Berlin Wall, the game posits that the Cold War has gone hot, and Russia has invaded West Germany. Combat takes place in villages and suburbs on the outskirts of an unnamed German city.

=== Components ===
The game box includes:

- two identical 17" x 22" hex grid maps (one for each player) scaled at 55 ft (17 m) per hex
- 1400 counters
- 64-page rulebook
- 40-page book of charts and tables
- 8-page Charts & Tables booklet
- 4 six-sided dice
- counter tray

=== Gameplay ===
Cityfight uses a "double-blind" system of dual boards so that each player does not know where his opponent's forces are. Players sit back to back, and as their units "search" the map, each player calls out a hex number, and the opponent replies if there is a unit hidden in that hex, similar to the children's game Battleship. Several scenarios are provided with specific victory conditions. For example, in one scenario, the Russian player has to successfully escape from a village before numerically superior Allied forces can find and destroy the Russians. Each turn represents 20 seconds in game time.

== Publication history ==
In 1973, SPI released Sniper!, the first commercial tactical board wargaming treatment of man-to-man combat in the Second World War. the first Cityfight was designed by Joseph Balkoski and Stephen Donaldson, and published by SPI in 1979. Reviewer Paul King noted several problems with Sniper!, namely the fact that all the counters were visible on the board for both players, meaning "players would react to this situation so that the combatants went about the board with precognition." In 1979, SPI released Cityfight, a game that tried to correct this by giving each player an identical mapboard, where enemy counters would appear only when spotted. The game was designed by Joseph M. Balkoski and Stephen Donaldson, with graphics and artwork by Redmond A. Simonsen.

== Reception ==
In Issue 46 of the British wargaming magazine Perfidious Albion, Geoffrey Barnard commented, "It is not a 'normal' game, it attempts to achieve the one real ingredient of recent tactical operations, utter confusion on the ground as soon as anything begins to happen." Barnard concluded, "The game really does give the feel of being 'on the ground' rather than the usual wargame situation of being up in the spy satellite."

In Issue 27 of Phoenix, Paul King thought the large amount of the material in the box "is enough to make all but the strongest heart quail." Nevertheless, King found the game very playable, much improved over the game mechanics of Sniper!, and enjoyable to play. He concluded, "Cityfight has the makings of a great game."

The Big Board reviewed Cityfight, and found the rules clearly presented. "Reading through them, it is easy to visualize the game sequence and understand the various mechanics." The reviewer found the occasional bit of humor enjoyable as well, quoting the rule “Irregular units may not execute indirect fire; they may, however, execute the mayor.” Because of the double-blind set-up, the reviewer thought "SPI’s CityFight is a tense game. In this game, there was very little contact between the opposing sides, yet their presence was felt at all times. [...] Unlike most wargames that give players omniscience over the battlefield, CityFight leaves you almost completely in the dark. Turns can be deadly quiet, almost boring, and all of a sudden, a firefight breaks out."

In a retrospective review in Issue 13 of The Journal of 20th Century Wargaming, Marion Bates thought the scenarios were "a mixed lot." Bates also thought the game system "somewhat convoluted." Despite these issues, Bates concluded, "The real question here is: does it work? Yup, it does, but not always easily. A gamer who comes to the game with a certain amount of determination and interest in the subject will discover a challenging experience, which will occasionally frustrate and invariably fascinate — a tense contest for those who can avoid getting bogged down in the detail of it."

== Awards ==
At the 1980 Origins Awards, City Fight won the Charles S. Roberts Award for Best 20th Century Game of 1979.
