= Keith Rocco (painter) =

Painter

Keith Rocco is a military and historical painter working in the United States.

== Biography ==
His interest in military subjects developed at an early age. One of his first books, received as a Christmas present when he was ten, was The Golden Book of the Civil War, and he began collecting Civil War and Napoleonic artifacts when he was 14. Today, his collection includes original uniforms and artifacts as well as modern replicas which he uses as props for his paintings. His home and studio are in the Shenandoah Valley of Virginia.

== Works ==
Keith Rocco is known for his illustrative paintings of the American Civil War. Individual soldier studies figure prominently in Rocco’s oeuvre. He has also been commissioned for mural work including three large murals for the Wisconsin Veterans Museum in Madison, Wisconsin. Another commission was for the Pamplin Historical Park and was on a massive scale: over 4,000 square feet (370 m^{2}). In 2003, he designed the centerpiece mural “Gettysburg”, for the Abraham Lincoln Presidential Library and Museum in Springfield, Illinois. University of Illinois Press, University of Georgia Press, Chapel Hill, Military History, American History Illustrated, Napoleon Journal, Soldats Napoleonien, Le Livre Chez Vous and other publishing houses have all featured his work on their covers and dust jackets. His works are also in the collections of the National Park Service, the United States Army, the Andrew Mellon Foundation, the Pentagon, the Atlanta Historical Society, the United States House of Representatives, Gettysburg National Park, the City of Fredericksburg, Virginia, the National Guard Heritage Collection, and the U.S. Army War College.
