= Panzergruppe Guderian (game) =

1976 WWII board wargame

- Cover of SPI flat-tray edition, 1976
- Designers: Jim Dunnigan
- Illustrators: Redmond A. Simonsen
- Publishers: Simulations Publications Inc.
- Publication: 1976
- Genres: WWII

PanzerGruppe Guderian is a board wargame published by Simulations Publications, Inc. in 1976 that simulates the 1941 Battle of Smolensk during World War II.

== Description ==
During Operation Barbarossa, Germany's 1941 invasion of the Soviet Union, the Second Panzer Group led by Generaloberst Heinz Guderian attempted to encircle Russian forces at Smolensk. Panzergruppe Guderian is a simulation of that battle.

=== Components ===
The original pull-out game comes with:

- 32" x 22" paper hex grid map scaled to 10.5 km (6.5 mi) per hex
- 200 die-cut counters
- 8-page rulebook

The map shows the USSR from Vitebsk to the last forest before Moscow.

The flat-pack edition added a plastic counter tray, clear plastic cover, and cover graphic sheet. The Designer's Edition added a large box, and the paper map was mounted.

The Avalon Hill edition featured a slight smaller 31.4" x 21.5" map, and 260 counters packaged in a "bookcase" box.

=== Untried units ===
The board wargame Invasion: America, published in January 1976, was the first board wargame to use the concept of "untried units" — American militia units display a question mark when initially laid on the board; their true combat strength is not revealed until the opposing player engages them in combat and the unit is flipped over. Panzergruppe Guderian, published six months later, used the "untried unit" concept to represent all Soviet units: the Soviet player initially picks face-down units randomly and deploys them face down; their type (e.g. infantry, armor) and movement values are displayed, but not their strengths. Neither player knows the unit's combat strength until it first engages in combat, when it is flipped over, revealing its offensive and defensive capabilities. Some Soviet units have zero combat value, and are removed from the game when revealed.

=== Gameplay ===
The Soviet player moves his units first, then conducts attacks. The German moves, attacks, then moves his mechanized forces a second time. During either movement phase he may conduct overruns (attacks at half strength, using only units which began the turn in the same hex - scattering the regiments of a German division on an adverse combat result is therefore a key Soviet tactic).

Counters represent divisions. German panzer and motorised infantry divisions consist of several regiments, whose combat strength is doubled ("divisional integrity") if all units are stacked together. The loss of one regiment can therefore cripple a German division, giving the Soviets an incentive to stand and fight. All other divisions are shown as single counters, albeit with the chance to take multiple step losses in the case of German infantry divisions. Units may take step losses instead of retreating, and may advance after combat along the enemy line of retreat. The game contains rudimentary rules for air interdiction. The German player has to decide how much strength to devote to reducing surrounded pockets of Soviet troops and how much to push on to conquer fresh objectives. The Soviet player has leader counters representing commanders of “armies” roughly the size of a German corps and in the course of the game can airlift two of them out of German pockets.

=== Victory conditions ===
The German side receives victory points for capturing certain geographical objectives. The Soviet gains points for destroying entire German divisions and for recapturing locations taken by the Germans.

== Publication history ==
Panzergruppe Guderian was designed by Jim Dunnigan, with cartography and graphic design by Redmond A. Simonsen, and first appeared as a pull-out game in Strategy & Tactics No. 57 (July–August 1976). It was also published as a flat-pack box, and as a Designer's Edition boxed set.

After TSR took over SPI in 1982, it sold the rights to Panzergruppe Guderian to Avalon Hill, which published a new edition of the game in 1984.

== Reception ==
In Issue 9 of Perfidious Albion, Herman Vos compared this game to Simulations Publications's 1976 game Revolt in the East and called this game "miles superior to Revolt in the East. RitE is fun but that is about it. As a simulation it hardly makes any sense, just pushing some figures around on a map. PGG is a great game, however, as the system allows a realistic simulation of Blitzkrieg as well as tenacious resistance, both ahead of and to the rear of the Panzer Spearheads!"

In his 1977 book The Comprehensive Guide to Board Wargaming, Nicholas Palmer called this a "Fluid operational game [...] The most popular recent East Front game and spiritual father of several more games with the same basic system." However, Palmer had issues with the untried units rule, saying, "Personally I find the untried units rather odd: they range from excellent to useless, and their owner has no more prior idea of their value than the enemy."

In the 1980 book The Best of Board Wargaming Marcus Watney wrote that the game was “immediately hailed as a small masterpiece”. He gave it a high rating for excitement (80%), 60% for realism, and owing to the untried units an exceptionally high 100% rating for solitaire suitability.

In Issue 50 of Moves, Steve List called this "a very good and popular game [...] a happy blend of old and new ideas." He concluded, "This is both a playable game and a reasonably good simulation."

In Issue 7 of Phoenix (May–June 1977), Graham Wheatly found that the three-color mapsheet was "a pleasure to behold", and he also complimented the graphic designer for not adding extraneous tables and charts to the map. He noted the game was designed to be unbalanced in favor of the German player, and warned the Russian player to look for any opportunity to slow the German advance: "In any way, gain time, as time is the most important thing in this highly playable game of the Russian war."

In The Guide to Simulations/Games for Education and Training, Martin Campion commented on using this as an educational aid, saying the game "is a superb representation of the German Blitzkrieg in Russia in 1941 — if the players take advantage of the possibilities. The rules are understandable enough that I have been able to give the game to students to play on their own."

In the 1980 book The Complete Book of Wargames, game designer Jon Freeman thought the game was marginally unbalanced in favor of the Germans, but commented, "Panzergruppe Guderian was an advance in the state of the art for operational simulations of World War II." He found the "system of untried units is a novel and interesting way to handle the qualitative differences between the German and Russian organizations during the period." However, Freeman did have issues with the variable and hidden strengths of Russian units, saying, "The extreme variation in actual combat strength is, however, too great for either realism or, certainly, play balance — which is not one of the game's strong points." Although he thought the Russian player, always on the defensive, "would die of frustration — if boredom didn't put him to sleep", Freeman still concluded by giving the game an Overall Evaluation of "Very Good" for solitaire play, but only "Fair to Good" for multiplayer play.

In the inaugural issue of SPI Revival, Ted Kim noted that the map was not geographically accurate, commenting that "it is clear distances are distorted from reality." He also pointed out that two urban centers – Gzhatsk and Kaluga – were on the wrong side of the river. However, he noted that the game "skillfully combined [various] elements to produce an exciting, fun and playable system that was not overly complex." He concluded, "There are many nits to pick in the area of simulation. But none are fatal to the system or to the fun."

== Awards ==
At the 1977 Origins Awards, Panzergruppe Guderian was a finalist for a Charles S. Roberts Award in the category "Best Strategic Game of 1976".

== Other reviews and commentary ==
- Moves No. 29 – Panzergruppe Guderian: Assaulting the Mystery: Redmond A. Simonsen
- Moves #33 – Panzergruppe Guderian: A Dissenting Approach: Bill Dunne, Mike Gunson, and David Parish
- General Vol.21 No. 4 Is Smolensk Burning?: Panzergruppe Guderian
- Fire & Movement No. 5 – Der Russlandkrieg: Friedrich Helfferich
- Fire & Movement #12 – Panzergruppe Guderian: The Battle of Smolensk, July 1941: Ralph Vickers
- Fire & Movement #63 – World War II Anthology: Chapter 3: The Eastern Front: Rick Swan
- Campaign #79 – Panzergruppe Guderian: Larry Lippert and Gregory Mumm)
- JagdPanther No. 15 – Panzergruppe Guderian: Stephen V. Cole
- Strategist #182 – Panzergruppe Guderian: Ryan Schultz
- Strategist #193 – Panzergruppe Guderian Review
- Casus Belli No. 1 (April 1980)
- Jeux & Stratégie #6
- The Playboy Winner's Guide to Board Games
