= I Will Fight No More... Forever =

1979 board wargame

Cover art by Rodger B. MacGowan

I Will Fight No More... Forever, subtitled "A Strategic and Tactical Study of the Retreat of the Nez Perce, 1877", is a board wargame published by Simulations Canada in 1979 that simulates the Nez Perce War. The title of the game is taken from the words of surrender attributed to Chief Joseph of the Nez Perce.

== Background ==
In 1855, the United States government signed a treaty with the Nez Perce nation, giving them title over 7,500,000 acres (30,000 km^{2}) of their traditional lands in Oregon, Washington and Idaho. However, a decade later, as settlers and gold miners clamored for access to the Nez Perce lands, the government reneged on the 1855 treaty and forced a new treaty on the Nez Perce, reducing their reservation to one-tenth its original size. Although some Nez Perce bands agreed to the new treaty, others did not and refused to move. Tensions rose and several Nez Perce were murdered. In 1877, young Nez Perce warriors enacted revenge, killing several settlers. The U.S. Army under the command of General Oliver Otis Howard moved in to force the renegade bands onto the new reservation, but were defeated by the Nez Perce at the Battle of White Bird Canyon. The Nez Perce under Chief Joseph then began a long fighting retreat, trying to get to the Canadian border, where they would be out of the jurisdiction of the U.S. Army.

== Description ==
I Will Fight No More... Forever is a two-person wargame in which one player controls Nez Perce forces and the other controls elements of the U.S. Army. The game includes two maps, a strategic hex grid map scaled at 20 miles (32 km), and a tactical map scaled at 25 yards (23 m) per hex. Other components include 255 double-sided counters and a 12-page rule book.

Rules cover ambushes, warrior bands, melee and fire combat, Sitting Bull, army howitzers, Gatling guns and horses.

=== Victory conditions ===
The game lasts 29 strategic turns, or any turn after the 25th if all strategic Nez Perce units cross the Canadian border. The U.S. Army receives Victory Points for eliminating Nez Perce units, intact lodges that are captured — Victory Points are deducted if lodges are destroyed — and Nez Perce units that surrender. The Nez Perce gain Victory Points for uncaptured lodges and units that survive to end of the game.

== Publication history ==
Stephen Newberg designed I Will Fight No More... Forever, which was published in 1979 by Simulations Canada, who printed 1000 copies featuring cover art by Rodger B. MacGowan.

Newberg later wrote, "The most difficult of all military operations is the contested retreat. Every great military writer from Sun Tzu to Clausewitz agrees on this. The most famous such retreat is Xenophon's March of the Ten Thousand to home. Chief Joseph’s band of Nez Perce, in 1877, retreated further, against more opposition, and over worse terrain. To make the game work, it required both an operational and a tactical level."

The original print run sold out, and 25 years after its publication, critic Steve Carey reported that the game's resale value was very high, writing, "Being a scarce game with an innovative design on an unusual subject and without much competition, Fight No More will command a hefty premium if it comes up for sale. This is one of the top collectible titles from SimCan."

In 2016, Compass Games republished I Will Fight No More... Forever in Issue 82 of Paper Wars

== Reception ==
In Issue 20 of Fire & Movement, historian John Prados commented, "The battle board pieces really feel like handling Indian Braves and Cavalry troopers." Prados found terrain on the two-colour map hard to distinguish, noting, "The board would have much to gain from a third color, though, as some of the hard terrain is difficult to make out." Prados also pointed out that the game was missing some key elements of a Western setting, writing, "Fight No More surprisingly misses the opportunity to have dedicated battle boards for an Army fort and town, both of which are staples of Western theme." Prados also noted "some unresolved rules questions on stacking." Despite this, Prados concluded on a positive note, saying, "Fight No More is interesting and fast-paced, there is a lot of action and the overall impression it gives is quite satisfying. This game system would make an excellent model for an evenly matched Indian-Cavalry confrontation on an even larger scale."

In a retrospective review in Issue 10 of Simulacrum, Steve Carey wrote, "Fight No More is regarded as the best simulation (not that there are that many other designs to choose from!) of the 19th century US-Indian conflicts." Carey also pointed out "Knowing that this is an obscure topic to most of us, [designer Stephen] Newberg thoughtfully included a full page prologue to provide gamers with some historical background. It seems that the designer really put his heart into this package."

== Reviews ==
- Strategy & Tactics #78
- Perfidious Albion #42 (p13)
- Adventure Gaming #10
