= Divine Wind (wargame) =

1981 WWII board wargame

Cover of boxed set with artwork by Rodger B. MacGowan, 1981

Divine Wind, subtitled "Japan in the Pacific, 41–45", is a strategic board wargame published by Simulations Canada in 1981 that simulates the Pacific Campaign during World War II.

== Description ==
Divine Wind is a two-player board wargame where one player controls the Japanese, and the other player controls the Allies. The game starts immediately following the attack on Pearl Harbor.

=== Gameplay ===
The board is divided into 12 regions. Any actions, including movement and combat, use operations points, a certain number of which are allocated each turn depending on how many bases in a region the player has. Extensive paperwork for each of the twelve regions must be kept for initiative, operations point allocations, submarines, and construction.

The game uses an alternating "I Go, You Go" system where one player moves and attacks in one region, then the other player moves and attacks. Completing this process in all twelve regions completes one game turn, which represents one month.

Due to the size of the Pacific, fleet movement is hidden. Each player conducts a search to see if they can "see" the opponent's fleet. If one player finds their opponent, but the other player does not, the "blind" player's air points are reduced to one-third.

=== Scenarios ===
The campaign game covers the entire war from 1941 to 1945, and takes 48 turns. Shorter scenarios cover one year of the war each and run for 13 turns.

== Publication history ==
Divine Wind was designed by Steve Newberg, and was published by Simulations Canada as both a ziplock bag game and a boxed set in 1981, with cover art by Rodger B. MacGowan. A total of 2000 copies were printed, and the entire production run sold out.

== Reception ==
In Issue 32 of Fire & Movement, Friedrich Helfferich remarked, "All in all, Divine Wind is a remarkable technical design achievement. It is, however, too big for its format. The Pacific War buff will keep hoping for a game as perceptive and uncluttered as this, but with more realistic detail instead of ingenious but improbable design gimmicks"

In Issue 59 of Moves, Nick Schuessler was of two minds about the rules, writing, "The rules can only be described as turgid in style and form, but once you've struggled through the unbroken chunks of type, it's hard to see where Newberg could have simplified or abstracted without doing basic damage to his theme. Each component (air, land, sea, and logistics) is as basic as possible; that Divine Wind ends up so firmly in the micro-monster category is proof of just how difficult the Pacific theatre is to deal with." Schuessler thought the extensive record-keeping slowed the game down too much, but noted that the historicity of the game was "Excellent. Both players are confronted with the strategic problems of the original participants." Schuessler concluded that "For a single map Pacific game, [it is] the best of the lot. Divine Wind is a good alternative to those who yearn after [ SPI]'s War in the Pacific but can't afford to rent a hall. However, the bookkeeping makes it bad for solitaire, and the length puts it beyond the beer 'n' pretzels crowd."

In Issue 24 of The Grenadier, James Gordon thought the game "suffers from a unique flaw; it’s too accurate for its own good. Simulating the entire Pacific theater calls for a broad concepts for the direction and fighting of that four-year campaign, which the designer handles well enough. But beyond that, Divine Wind attempts to balance a grand strategic focus with an operational accuracy, and still come out playable." Gordon concluded, "For a Pacific war fan, interested in a detailed, logistically oriented game, Divine Wind offers a very involved system and guarantees many hours of enjoyment."

In a retrospective review in Issue 10 of Simulacrum, Luc Olivier wrote that the game is "a small jewel with too much inside. It is difficult to go into the game and play it correctly, but the result can be rewarding."
