= Inchon (wargame) =

1981 Korean War board wargame

Cover art by Rodger B. MacGowan

Inchon, subtitled "Turning the Tide in Korea, 15–26 September 1950", is a board wargame published by Simulations Canada in 1981 that simulates the amphibious assault at Incheon during the Korean War.

== Background ==
Following World War II, Japanese forces that had occupied Korea surrendered to Soviet forces north of the 38th parallel and to American forces in the south. With the rise of the Cold War, this led to the formation of two separate states, both of whom claimed authority over the entire Korean Peninsula. Border clashes inflamed tensions, and in June 1950, the In Min Gun (North Korean army, or IMG) invaded South Korea. Although American and United Nations forces arrived to aid the South Korean army, by August 1950, the IMG were on the brink of victory, having pushed the opposition into a small pocket called the Pusan Perimeter. The UN forces under the command of General Douglas MacArthur decided to attempt to save the Pusan Perimeter by cutting the IMG supply lines at Incheon via a risky amphibious assault.

== Description ==
Inchon is a two-person wargame in which one player controls UN and South Korean forces and the other controls IMG (North Korean) forces.

=== Gameplay ===
The game system is based on the system used in the 1979 game White Death developed by Frank Chadwick and published by Game Designers Workshop. Instead of the traditional "I Go, You Go" alternating system of turns where one player moves and fires followed by the other player, Inchon divides its turns into a series of "impulses". Each turn, both players are given 9 movement points. In the first impulse, one player uses any number of their movement points — but must use at least one — followed by indirect and direct fire. The other player then has the same opportunity. The turn continues with alternating impulses until either all movement points have been used up, or neither player wishes to do anything more that turn.

=== Scenarios ===
The basic scenario is the historical simulation of the invasion, and dictates where all forces must be set up at the start of the game. Alternative rules allow for a free setup by South Korean forces, or the IMG can receive reinforcements more quickly.

=== Victory conditions ===
There are 12 turns in the game, each equating to one day of game time. The South Korean side earns victory points by achieving geographical objectives in and around Seoul, while the IMG side earns victory points by inflicting casualties.

== Publication history ==
Inchon was created by Steve Newberg and published by Simulations Canada featuring cover art by Rodger B. MacGowan. One thousand copies of the game were printed and quickly sold out.

== Reception ==
Jeffrey Tibbetts, writing in The Grenadier, warned that the game was not for beginners, noting, "Inchon was "tense and somewhat complex, requiring a fair amount of previous wargaming experience."

In Issue 28 if Fire & Movement, Jay Selover liked the game, commenting, "Despite its unassuming appearance, Inchon is a game with depth; there is plenty to think about and good planning is rewarded. Even if the market were glutted with Korean titles, I would still recommend it."

In Issue 16 of Panzerschreck, James Meldrum pointed out that the game fails to take into account a number of historical factors during the landings, and proposed three variant rules to overcome this.

In a retrospective review written twenty years after its release, Pratik Multani wrote, "Overall, a nicely detailed system that rewards careful coordination of indirect and direct fire on the part of the U.N. player and an orderly, fighting withdrawal on the part of the N.K. player." Multani concluded, "In general, the U.N. player has a distinct advantage, given the superior naval and air firepower, but the victory conditions help balance the game."
