= The Wilderness (wargame) =

American Civil War board wargame

The Wilderness, subtitled "Lee Meets Grant: An Operational Study", is a board wargame published by Simulations Canada in 1983 that simulates the Battle of the Wilderness during the American Civil War.

== Background ==
After a series of defeats and retreats in the Eastern Theater by a string of Union generals, President Abraham Lincoln appointed Ulysses S. Grant, victor of several notable battles in the Western Theater, to command of the Union armies. Grant decided that the way to end the war was to engage with Robert E. Lee's Confederate Army of North Virginia while driving towards the Confederate capital of Richmond. As Grant told Major General George Meade, commander of the Army of the Potomac, "Lee's army will be your objective point. Wherever Lee goes, there you will go also."

In May 1864, Grant's Overland Campaign started with Union armies crossing the Rapidan River into Spotsylvania County. The Union forces attempted to flank Lee's army by moving through a patchwork of thick forest and clearings known as The Wilderness. Lee correctly guessed at Grant's intention, and the two armies met in The Wilderness.

== Description ==
The Wilderness is a two-person wargame in which one player controls Union forces and the other controls Confederate forces. The game uses an elaborate five-level "command and control" system for leaders while they are taking and giving orders, being promoted, suffering injuries or being captured. In addition to the usual rules on movement, supply and combat, rules also cover unit effectiveness and two kinds of assault.

=== Gameplay ===
The turn sequence is a hybrid of the standard alternating "I Go, You Go" system, where the non-active player is given an opportunity to initiate combat:

- Active player
  - Fires artillery
  - Moves
- Non-active player
  - Fires artillery
  - Attacks any adjacent enemies (Skirmish or Assault)
- Active player
  - Fires artillery
  - Skirmish or Assault any adjacent enemy units
  - Support Assault using reinforcements

Optional rules deal with the thick undergrowth that was a hallmark of this battle — bush can be hacked down to provide defensive fields of fire. It can also ignited by gunfire, burn for a time, smolder and then possibly reignite.

== Publication history ==
Simulations Canada planned to publish three American Civil War games, one set in 1861, one in 1863 and one in 1864, in order to demonstrate the evolution of army command structures during the American Civil War. Lee at the Crossroads (1980) was the first to be released, although the second chronologically, being set in 1863. The Wilderness, set in 1864, was the second game in the series to be published, although the third, chronologically. The game set in 1861, although planned, was never produced.

The Wilderness was designed by Steve Newberg and was published by Simulations Canada in 1982 with a print run of 1000 copies. It was not as well received as its predecessor, Lee at the Crossroads, and designer Steve Newberg later wrote, "It worked out well as history, and even reasonably well as a game, but I think the closed nature of the terrain hampered the players."

== Reception ==
Nikita Frobish, writing in The Grenadier, noted "There have been very few simulations of this subject. This alone would give SimCan's The Wilderness value. However, the system is a good one for simulating Civil War battles at this scale, and, while not easy to master, it is not particularly difficult to play."

In Issue 95 of Strategy & Tactics, David Cook was grudging in his acceptance of the game, writing, "Somewhat awkward on bookkeeping and systems, but it works." Cook did not feel the game system suited the Battle of the Wilderness and concluded, "Historically weak and lacking in the grit of tactics or the sweep of strategy. Either ignore the battle and play the system, or wait for somebody to do a better Wilderness game."

In Issue 96 of Fire & Movement, Jamie Adams found the game system cumbersome, writing, "The game uses the same system as Lee at the Crossroads and should be dismissed as more of the same number-crunching."

John O'Toole, writing in The Wargamer, noted that at that time, there had only been two other games about the Battle of the Wilderness, both by Simulations Publications Inc. (SPI), one quite large and the other quite small; O'Toole felt that both had "fallen flat." But O'Toole was not convinced that this latest attempt was any better, writing, "Simulations Canada's game, in filling the gap [between large and small], has nonetheless done it in a way curiously reminiscent of SPI — it is more educational than entertaining." On the plus side, O'Toole found the Order of Battle "impressive", and the game map to be "strikingly accurate," although he did note that the brown hex numbers against the brown of wilderness hexes made "identification difficult for any but eagles looking for food." O'Toole thought this was a good game as a historical simulation, but not an especially enjoyable game, commenting, "A sizeable segment of the wargaming world would not care to sit watching two hordes widdle each other gradually into exhaustion. I would advise the Beer 'n' Pretzel Club to pass this one by. The exciting Lee at the Crossroads system, like the Army of the Potomac, was not used to its best advantage in The Wilderness." O'Toole concluded, "The historian will marvel at the incohesive nature of the battle, the gamer will weary of the chaos ... The Civil War student will find this a worthwhile addition to his library, and its exploration rewarding."

In a retrospective review in Issue 10 of Simulacrum, Brian Train noted, "Casualties are tracked by a roster system, which provides a certain amount of limited intelligence, but the confused nature of the historical battle, which was a series of isolated ambushes and almost accidental firefights, might have been served better by a system of inverted counters."
