= Assault on Tobruk =

Board wargame published in 1980

Cover of SimCan boxed set, with art by Rodger B. MacGowan, 1980

Assault on Tobruk, subtitled "Rommel Triumphant, 20 June 1942," is a board wargame published by Simulations Canada in 1980 that simulates the North African Battle of Tobruk during World War II. Compass Games later reissued a new edition of the game.

== Background ==
After the British under Archibald Wavell had defeated the Italian 10th Army in Libya in 1940, Wavell was not allowed to continue the offensive to capture the port of Tripolitania. This allowed the Afrika Korps under Erwin Rommel to land, and the Germans went on the offensive. After defeating the British forces around the important port of Tobruk in 1941, forcing them to retreat to Egypt, Rommel attacked Tobruk itself. While German forces were repulsed by the Australian defenders in 1941, Rommel attacked again in June 1942. The Australians had already left North Africa at that point, and the Allied defenses in the area of Tobruk had been allowed to deteriorate.

== Description ==
Assault on Tobruk is a two-player board wargame in which one player controls the Axis forces and the other the Allied forces.

With only 250 die-cut counters, a 22" x 27" hex grid map scaled at 650 per hex and only twelve pages of rules, the game has been characterized as having a similar scope and the low complexity of classic Avalon Hill games from the early 1960s such as Battle of the Bulge and D-Day.

The game comes with one historical scenario and six "what if?" scenarios.

== Publication history ==
Assault on Tobruk was designed by Steve Newberg and published by Simulations Canada packaged in either a ziplock bag or as a boxed set. Both had the same cover art by Rodger B. MacGowan, although the ziplock bag version art was monochrome while the boxed set had full-colour art.

In 2021, Compass Games republished the game.

== Reception ==
In Issue 25 of Fire & Movement, Bob Proctor noted, "The physical production is typical of Simulations Canada. They do a good job on a limited budget; just don't expect the lavish production of bigger game companies." As an example, Proctor mentioned that the counters "are die-cut, but not all the way to the corners; if broken apart instead of cut out, they will have fuzzy corners." But other than the component quality, Proctor liked the game, saying, "Overall, this is a short, clean simple game, well researched and with appeal for North Africa buffs -- all the more so since it does with a topic not previously covered on this scale." Proctor concluded, "The game will also have special appeal for old-timers longing for new games in the mold of the old Avalon Hill classics."

In a retrospective review in Issue 10 of Simulacrum, Brian Train commented, "While never receiving too much press in its prime, this low-complexity game is a solid effort. It can be found at quite a bargain compared with comparably sized ones that are being produced today."

== Other reviews and commentary ==
- Casus Belli #22 (Oct 1984)
