= With Fire and Sword (wargame) =

Thirty Years' War board wargame

With Fire and Sword, subtitled "A Strategic Game of the Thirty Years' War", is a board wargame published by Simulations Canada in 1983 that simulates the Thirty Years' War.

== Description ==
With Fire and Sword is a board wargame for two players in which one controls the forces of Bourbon France and its allies, and the other controls Hapsburg Spain and its allies.

The game includes a hex grid map of Europe scaled at 48 kilometres (30 mi) per hex, as well as 200 counters and an 8-page rulebook.

=== Gameplay ===
Each turn represents a year. There are no movement limits for counters, but each unit suffers from increasing attrition the further it moves.

The game system uses a standard "I Go, You Go" alternating system of turns, which consist of the following phases:

1. Pay and Recruit Soldiers
2. Area Recovery
3. Random Events
4. Initiative (to determine which player moves first)
5. Movement and Combat by 1st player
6. Movement and Combat by 2nd player
7. Attrition

=== Scenarios ===
The game comes with three scenarios covering each of the three decades of the war. These can all be connected by a Campaign Game.

== Publication history ==
Freelance game designer Peter Hollinger, who had a particular interest in the Thirty Years' War, created With Fire and Sword, which was then published by Simulations Canada in 1983 with a print run of 1000 copies.

== Reception ==
In Issue 27 of The Wargamer, Christoper Vorder Bruegge found many problems with this game, starting with the map, which he felt contained a lot of errors and distortions due to the hex grid. Bruegge asked why the hex grid was necessary for a strategic game where each turn represented one year. Bruegge also noted that "this is strictly a two-player military game. There is no diplomacy, no concern for religious issues, no external influences, and no naval activity." Bruegge liked the movement system, calling it "the best feature of the game", but had issues with the rules for unpaid troops, and for leader casualties during combat. Bruegge concluded on a negative note, saying, "The game is not very historical, has an inadequate counter mix, is played on a grotesque map, and offers limited strategic possibilities ... The game is neither simple enough for beer and pretzels play, nor sophisticated enough for serious wargaming."

In a retrospective review in Issue 10 of Simulacrum, Olivier Clementin found some errors in both the map and the counter mix. Like Bruegge, Clementin also noted this was strictly a military game: "there are no diplomatic rules, nations enter the war at set dates, and there are no political rules either." Clementin concluded, "On the whole, the game is not very good, but ... it is probably the only game on the period which is playable. It plays rather quickly (only winter attrition and Victory Point calculations are tedious) and it gives a good idea of the three phases of the war."

== Other commentary and references ==
- The Grenadier #20
- Perfidious Albion #61
