= Seapower & the State =

1982 naval board wargame

Seapower & the State, subtitled "A Strategic Study of World War Three at Sea, 1984–1994", is a Cold War-era board wargame published by Simulations Canada in 1982 that simulates potential naval warfare during a hypothetical World War III.

== Description ==
Seapower & the State is a two-person wargame in which one player acts as the overall commander of the naval forces of NATO and Japan ("the West"), and the other is the overall commander of the Soviet Union's naval forces ("the East"). The concept is strategic. As designer Steven Newberg wrote, "The strategic dimensions of the application of seapower are seldom addressed in modern entertainment war gaming, though they are a staple we deal with constantly on the professional side of the business. With Seapower & the State we tried to bring a bit of the modern strategic gaming concept to board wargamers. The scale is global. You now have to consider recon satellites and anti-satellite satellites. Tanker traffic flows moving oil and freighter routes for hard goods become major concerns. Fleets and warships do not exist in isolation, but as part of the grander scheme."

=== Components ===
The game box contains a 22" x 28" hex grid global map that includes two smaller detail maps of the Arctic Ocean and Europe, 400 double-sided counters and a 13-page rulebook. The global map uses an Eckert-Zenithal projection that presents all oceans in proper scale but distorts the scale of land masses.

=== Setup ===
Depending on the scenario chosen, some or all of the 400 counters are placed on the board at predetermined positions to start the game — there are no reinforcements or new units added to the map once play has begun. Critic Don Gilman warned that setup takes at least an hour.

=== Gameplay ===
Each turn represents two weeks of game time. Each turn has four main phases:

1. Conflict Level Determination: Players have an auction to bid on what level of conflict will happen this turn: 1. Peace (Bidding player earns 10 Victory Points) 2. Conventional Warfare 3. Tactical Nuclear 4. Operational Nuclear (The bidding player loses 75 Victory Points) 5. Strategic Nuclear (The bidding player loses 150 Victory Points). If someone bids the highest level, the game instantly ends, with the assumption that the world has been destroyed.
2. Eastern Forces Turn
  1. Movement
  2. Search: Using satellites and aircraft, the player tries to determine the exact location in a hex of opposing naval forces.
  3. Combat: During offensive combat, the targeted forces are allowed simultaneous defensive fire. This may result in the destruction of both attacker and defender.
  4. Reconnaissance and Communications Satellite Launch/Anti-Satellite Launch
3. Western Forces Turn
  1. Movement
  2. Search
  3. Combat
  4. Reconnaissance and Communications Satellite Launch/Anti-Satellite Launch
4. Bookkeeping

=== Scenarios ===
There are three scenarios: 1984, 1989, and 1994, all based on the game designer's estimates of satellite and combat capabilities in the years following the game's publication in 1982.

=== Victory conditions ===
There are two paths to victory:

- The West gains Victory Points at the end of each turn for each global shipping lane that is open. The East gains Victory Points for sinking commercial shipping vessels. Both players gain Victory Points for destroying enemy ballistic submarines (but neither side gains victory points for destroying any other type of military vessel). At the end of the scenario, the player with the most Victory Points wins.

OR

- One of the players can win an Operational Nuclear war by first having ballistic missiles on station and guidance satellites in orbit, and then preventing the enemy from completing a reciprocal attack by then destroying the enemy's ballistic submarines and reconnaissance satellites. With the enemy's offensive abilities destroyed by nuclear weapons and the enemy unable to launch a reciprocal attack, the surviving player wins the game.

== Publication history ==
Steven Newberg designed Sea Power and the State. Two thousand copies were published by Simulations Canada in 1982.

== Reception ==
The Grenadier warned that this game was not to everyone's taste with the comment, "The naval buff will find this game intriguing, but others will spend their money elsewhere."

Lt. John J. Vanore, USN commented, "All in all, I'm quite enthusiastic about Seapower & the State. [Designer Steven] Newberg has taken some potentially troublesome aspects of the situation and has realistically reduced them to playable game terms." Vanore concluded, "Seapower & the State is a real gem and belongs in every naval gamer's inventory."

In Issue 13 of The Journal of 20th Century Wargaming, Don Gilman thought the simple combat rules gave the game "a gemlike shine", calling them "quick, clean, and very, very final." Gilman had some minor issues with the game:

- A vessel's speed was only used to calculate movement, and was not taken into account during combat.
- Player's aid cards listing important procedures would have been useful.
- The Australian aircraft carrier HMAS Melbourne had been decommissioned in 1982 and therefore was not available for the 1984 scenario.
- The game starts with no satellites in orbit, which Gilman thought was "a situation unlikely at any time."
- All vessels listed for a scenario were available; none were in drydock for overhauls or refurbishments, which Gilman found "disconcerting," pointing out that in the United States Navy of 1983 "at any given time we have one carrier being modernized ... and two undergoing some sort of lengthy yard period. The maintenance of other ship types depends on the class, but applied to all the navies of the world I believe that the number of starting ships would drop appreciably."

Despite these issues, Gilman concluded on a positive note, saying, "Overall, I recommend Seapower to anyone looking for a quick mini-monster that sheds a great deal of light on a very important aspect of modern military art. The price is a little stiff for the components, but you are paying for the research and this system. Certainly it belongs in every naval wargamer's collection."

In Issue 22 of the French games magazine Casus Belli, Frédéric Armand noted "The game mechanics are clever and present many new ideas: however the rules are too short, and bear many similarities to an old Simulations Canada game, Raketny Kreyser. The overly concise rules contain many ambiguities, particularly with regard to underwater warfare." Armand pointed out that "In a game where anyone can locate any enemy ship, the aerial aspect of the game is unbalanced by many factors in favor of the Soviets. They can, for example, launch all their aircraft from any base each turn. They can thus overwhelm any taskforce with a multitude of aircraft, so as to suffer almost no losses. In fact, one of the most effective tactics during the game remains to throw as many combat points as possible on a hexagon since there is no limit to the number of units on a hex." Despite these faults, Armand concluded, "We may be disappointed by this very ambitious game, but nevertheless recommend it to those interested in the strategic and naval aspects of the Third World War."

In a retrospective review Bruce Costello called this "one of my favorite games. It is the only game I'm aware of that depicts WWIII at sea at the strategic-operational level ... Seapower shows the strategic interaction of all theaters, and clearly shows the decisive influence of naval strategy in a third world war." Costello concluded, "The map is not up to modern graphical standards and the counter density is occasionally a problem. Tracking the aircraft points is a hassle, but still I highly recommend the game."
