= Hannibal: The Italian Campaign =

1983 board wargame

Cover art by John Kuna

Hannibal: The Italian Campaign is a board wargame published by Simulations Canada in 1983 that simulates Hannibal's eight-year campaign against Rome during the Second Punic War.

== Background ==
In 218 BCE, Carthaginian general Hannibal undertook a multi-year land campaign against the Republic of Rome, moving his forces from present-day Spain through Gaul to the Alps and thence into the Italian Peninsula. Roman senatorial elections during Hannibal's campaign, especially following significant victories by Hannibal, resulted in changes to Roman leadership with commensurate changes to military strategy.

== Description ==
Hannibal is a two-person wargame in which one player controls the forces of Carthage and the other player controls Roman forces. As game developer Steven Newberg wrote, "the two concepts that struck me as making the game unique were the leadership rotation system used to reflect the Roman political situation, and the movement system, which had to be stretched to allow historical actions for the time scale, but not allow things to get unreal, a problem with a lot of Hannibal games."

=== Components ===
The game box contains a 22" x 27" hex grid map of the Italian peninsula, 200 double-sided counters and an 8-page rulebook.

=== Gameplay ===
Five pages of rules cover sieges, field and siege combat, recruitment of Gauls, Carthaginian reinforcements, elephants and Roman elections. Each turn representing a year of game time, and the game lasts for eight turns.

=== Victory conditions ===
The Roman player gains Victory Points for eliminating Carthaginian units. The Carthaginian player gains Victory Points for eliminating Roman units, but also for controlling provinces and cities at the end of each turn, with special Victory Points for capturing Capua and Tarentum.

The winner is the player who has accumulated the most Victory Points by the end of the game.

== Publication history ==
Peter Hollinger designed Hannibal, which was then developed by Steven Newberg. One thousand copies with cover art by John Kuna were published by Simulations Canada in 1983.

In 2019, Compass Games republished Hannibal as a pull-out game in Issue 95 of Paper Wars.

== Reception ==
In Issue 43 of Fire & Movement, Peter Hatton thought that despite his own disappointing experience, this game was worth playing, saying, "Peter Hollinger has designed a game faithful to the geography and strategic situation. One has an excellent framework for creating this epic struggle. Unfortunately, my own best strategy for the Carthaginians leads to unexciting play." Hatton concluded, "Overall, Hannibal has a good basis but will still profit from tinkering."

In Issue 95 of Strategy & Tactics, David Cook was not impressed, calling the game a failure. Cook pointed out "the most serious error on the map has to be the terrain. Where are the Alps? Movement in this game has got a serious problem." Cook concluded that the game had "major developmental flaws in the rules. So save your $20."

In a retrospective review Steve Carey did not find the production values very good, commenting, "the counters ... are hard to read with their tiny icons. The map is bland, and the design does not exude any panache." But Carey did like some of the more interesting rules concerning Roman elections and elephants. Despite this, Carey felt this subject had been better handled by other wargames, writing, "The old SPI game Punic Wars has more appeal, and Avalon Hill's Hannibal: Rome versus Carthage sets the standard for this period in history." Carey concluded on a negative note, saying, "There may be a good game buried in Hannibal somewhere, but you're going to have to find it."
