= Kriegsmarine (board game) =

Cover art by Rodger B. MacGowan, 1980

Kriegsmarine is a board wargame published by Simulations Canada (SimCan) in 1980 that is a simulation of tactical naval combat in the Atlantic and Mediterranean during World War II.

== Description ==
Kriegsmarine is a two-player naval wargame. The game includes seventeen scenarios based on historical encounters, which range from combat between two ships to fleet actions. The game has similar rules to SimCan's other naval games, allowing two or more games to be combined.

=== Components ===
The ziplock bag or game box contains:

- 22" x 28" paper hex grid map scaled at 100 yd (91 m) per hex
- 255 double-sided die-cut counters representing ships and airplanes of Britain, France, US, Netherlands, Canada, Australia, Soviet Union, and Germany, plus markers for torpedoes and other objects
- 16-page rule book

=== Gameplay ===
Each turn is divided into six phases:

1. Sighting
2. Gunfire
3. Vessel Movement and Depth Charge Combat
4. Torpedo Launching, Movement and Combat
5. Sighted Units Removal

Movement allowance is the maximum speed of the ship. Although torpedoes are mentioned in the turn phases, Kriegsmarine does not include any rules for torpedoes — these are only used if the game is combined with sister game Torpedo.

=== Victory conditions ===
In each scenario, the player must improve upon the historical result to win.

The spelling error ("Kreigsmarine") featured on both rulebook and map

== Publication history ==
Between 1978 and 1980, SimCan published three naval wargames using similar rules and identically scaled maps: IJN (1978, Pacific combat in WW II); Torpedo (1979, WW II submarine warfare); and Kriegsmarine, a game designed by Stephen Newberg and published by SimCan in a ziplock bag in 1980 with cover art by Rodger B. MacGowan. It was notable for the misspelled title "Kreigsmarine" on the rulebook and map. The game was also published as a boxed set. In total, SimCan printed 2000 copies of Kriegsmarine.

Nine years later, SimCan published a video game titled Kriegsmarine. Although it re-used Rodger MacGowan's cover art, the video game was not a direct translation of the board game, being a single-player game rather than a two-player game, and played at an operational rather than a tactical level.

== Reception ==
In Issue 29 of Phoenix, Andrew McGee found the rules "fairly short and well-organized" but did not like the rules for aircraft movement and combat, calling them "far from satisfactory." While McGee found seventeen scenarios to be "a reasonable number", he found the victory condition requiring a better result than history to be ambiguous, and didn't find much difference between the scenarios. He questioned the replayability value, saying "they are really not situations players will want to play over many times." He concluded, "As a simulation, Kriegsmarine might be politely be described as unfinished. [...] If you are simply interested in an enjoyable and well-balanced game, then I really cannot recommend Kriegsmarine to you. The rules have too many important gaps, and these scenarios are neither varied enough nor sufficiently well-balanced to make this game good value."

In The Wargamer, Chris Geggus felt the game bogged down under the weight of its rules, calling the game a "fair simulation of tactical naval combat of the era. As a game, however, I cannot recommend it as the mechanics of play far outweigh the action."

In a retrospective review in Issue #62 of Fire & Movement, while John Vanore did not think Kriegsmarine was on par with 1984's The Royal Navy (Quarterdeck Games), "it has definitely aged more gracefully than some of the competition and still provides some interesting play."

Writing in Issue 10 of Simulacrum, Joe Scolari was unsure of the realism of the game system, saying, "one could accurately describe the designer's overall approach to the game system as 'abstracted tactical.' The review concluded "if you are a naval gamer looking for a 'does-it-all' World War II system with a different flavor than the average tactical naval game, this series is worth a look."

== Other reviews and commentary ==
- The Wargamer Vol.1 #8
