= Napoleon's Last Triumph =

Napoleonic board wargame

Napoleon's Last Triumph, subtitled "An Operational Study of The Battle of Wagram, July 1809", is a board wargame published by Simulations Canada in 1982 that simulates the Battle of Wagram in July 1809 during the War of the Fifth Coalition.

== Background ==
In 1809, Archduke Charles of Austria-Teschen of Austria took advantage of Napoleon's focus on the war in Spain to invade Bavaria, a French ally. Napoleon responded by bringing his army to Bavaria, where he defeated the Austrians. The French followed the retreating army, and crossed the Danube River near the village of Wagram. After an evening attack failed to dislodge the Austrians, who occupied a strong defensive position on the Russbach Heights, the main battle began the following morning.

== Description ==
Napoleon's Last Triumph is a two-person wargame with 400 counters in which one player controls French forces and the other controls Austrian forces. Critic Jim Hind called this game "definitely on the big side", noting that unlike other wargames where only a portion of counters were on the map at any one time, most of this game's counters were on the map, increasing its size and complexity.

=== Gamplay ===
The game uses a complex set of Napoleonic rules, including eight possible formations for infantry (line, column, square, skirmish, village, undeployed, disordered, and for the French only, Order Mixte.) The Combat Results Table is likewise complex, as results are affected by the formation and class of the defenders. Each turn represents one hour of the battle.

=== Scenarios ===
The game comes with two scenarios:

1. A short 4-turn scenario designed to teach the rules, with the two armies already facing each other.
2. A longer 9-turn scenario that starts with the French still crossing the Danube and the Austrians scattered across the map.

== Publication history ==
Napoleon's Last Triumph was created by William Haggart over a number of years; he then sold the game to Simulations Canada, where Steve Newberg and Peter Hollinger revised the rules and developed it into its final form. Newberg later wrote, "Peter Hollinger and I found it intriguing for its unique grand tactical approach and systems. The game spent longer than normal in development, hammering these systems into a form a player not steeped in Napoleonics could understand and use." When the revision was finished, SimCan printed 1000 copies and released the game in 1982. This would be the only game that SimCan bought from a freelance designer.

In response to the revisions that had been made to his original game, Haggart independently wrote and released a 56-page booklet of "Designer's Notes" about how he had originally designed the game. Those that ordered this from Haggart also received his 44-page booklet containing the complete Order of Battle.

== Reception ==
Jeffrey Tibbetts, writing in The Grenadier, noted "Napoleon's Last Triumph employs a fire combat resolution system which encompasses the effects of four different levels of morale and four various states of formation while allowing the attacker to select from two forms of calculating the attack. This is the gem buried in the game."

Writing in the next issue of The Grenadier, James Naughton complimented the game, calling it "One of the best games on the Napoleonic wars in a long time, I think that it will prove to be a successor to the venerable Napoleon's Last Battles system. There is certainly much more substance to the game." Naughton concluded with a strong recommendation, writing, "I can't help but state that this is one of the best games and certainly the best simulation for its scale in this period."

In Issue 36 of Fire & Movement, David Churchman wrote, "Napoleon's Last Triumph is exceedingly well-researched. Each element of the game is well-grounded in history. [Designer William] Haggart has documented his work in [a separate] Designer's Notes and an Order of Battle, which the game purchaser will discover how to obtain. Do so before Haggart figures out how underpriced they are." Churchman concluded, ":The game is realistic because it takes so many factors of Napoleonic combat into account and because the underlying historical researhc is careful and comprehensive. It is complex and difficult to play ... It is an impressive accomplishment."

Jim Hind, writing in The Wargamer, found the Combat Result Table (CRT) to be complex, "though I admit it's laid out beautifully clearly." However, Hind had an issue with the factors used in the CRT, especially that "The quality of the firing units has no effect on these calculations ... Yet your quality does affect the casualties which your enemy will inflict on you." Hind found "The rest of the design is a similar odd mixture of lavish, nay, baroque, detail here, curious oversight there. Orders of battle for the two armies: Excellent. Map: Drab, with most curious oversights."
