= Lee at the Crossroads =

Board wargame published in 1980

Lee at the Crossroads is a board wargame published by Simulations Canada (SimCan) in 1980 that simulates the 1863 Battle of Gettysburg during the American Civil War. Each player takes the role of one of the opposing commanders, Confederate general Robert E. Lee or Union general George Meade.

== Background ==
In the summer of 1863, Confederate General Robert E. Lee marched the Army of Virginia north into Pennsylvania with the aim of reaching Harrisburg or possibly even Philadelphia in the hopes of persuading Northern politicians to agree to peace talks. Without foreplanning on either side, the Union and Confederate armies unexpectedly met at the small town of Gettysburg and joined in a titanic battle from July 1–3.

== Description ==
Lee at the Crossroads is a two-player board wargame that simulates the Battle of Gettysburg, using some rules that were unique for 1980. Unlike most board wargames of the time that resolve combat results based on the ratio of attacking strength to defending strength plus a die roll, damage is instead assigned as fixed percentages of each unit's strength based on a unit's quality classification. Also unlike its contemporaries, the counters of this game have a front and rear facing, and both attack and movement are affected by the counter's facing.

=== Components ===
The game box contains:

- two-color paper hex grid map scaled at 350 yd (320 m) per hex
- die-cut counters
- rulebook

=== Gameplay ===
The opposing players take the roles of the historic leaders of the two armies, and their command and control systems reflect the leaders' strengths and weaknesses. There are three levels of leaders; each commander has the ability to command a certain number of units. Commanders can choose to take control of more units, or to allow a commander one level down to take control of more units. Each game turn represents either two hours of daylight or five hours of night.

==== Stacking ====
Each hex can contain units adding up to 20 strength points plus units worth 20 artillery points plus an unlimited number of leaders, retreated units and straggled units.

=== Optional rules ===
There are optional rules to add more complexity to the game such as breastworks and artillery ammunition. There are also a number of "what if?" scenarios to explore various non-historical ideas: Lee doesn't retreat on July 3, but stays for a fourth day of fighting; Jeb Stuart commands the Confederate Third Corps; General John F. Reynolds replaces Meade as the Union commander.

=== Victory conditions ===
Destroying strength points, not making geographical gains, is the only way to reach victory.

- The Confederates win if they take 1.5 times as many strength points as the Union army.
- The Union forces win if they take 1.2 times as many strength points as the Confederates.

== Publication history ==
Simulations Canada was founded in 1977 as a wargame publisher, and quickly released nine titles in their first two years, including Dieppe and Raketny Kreyser. Steve Newberg was not happy with the many Gettysburg wargames in print in the late 1970s, and sought to develop a new mechanic for simulating the battle. The result was SimCan's tenth title, Lee at the Crossroads. Newberg later took the same battle system and used it for another SimCan American Civil War game, The Wilderness.

== Reception ==
In Issue 34 of Phoenix, Alex Cook and B.S. Rushton thought there were many difficulties with this game. One of the most troublesome was the stacking rule, which allowed large numbers of counters to be stacked onto one hex. Cook and Rushton found this "exceedingly tedious and cumbersome. All you need is patience to keep going and long fingernails to pick up great stacks of units. We had neither." The reviewers also disagreed with the victory conditions, saying, "Since the Confederates must take more strength points that the Union player, the onus is on the Confederates to attack. The Union can easily win by avoiding conflict." They thought that these problems could have been avoided "by greater attention to rule writing." They also recommended that, "The command structure is interesting but would be easier to operate if no stacking were allowed. [...] The game would be vastly improved if there were geographical objectives to be held or taken." They concluded, "We were not impressed with the game. Some features we liked, many others we did not. As a simulation, it is probably fairly accurate. Scenarios seem to go with historical accuracy. However, as a game, it leaves a lot to be desired."

In Fire & Movement #26, Bill Haggart commented, "Although neither complex or big, Lee is probably the best game of the Battle of Gettysburg on the market." Haggart liked the command rules, saying they were "simple but frustrating. They give both players appropriate headaches when they are trying to develop attacks." Haggart concluded by pointing out a number of problems with the game: "Victory conditions have seen extensive revisions. Not enough chits are supplied. The map is dull and lackluster."

In a retrospective review in Issue 10 of Simulacrum, Steve Carey noted, "Lee tries to be different from other contemporary Gettysburg games by focusing on casualties, not terrain held. Mechanics are somewhat innovative as hidden combat strengths and classifications can lead to many tense situations."

== Other reviews and commentary ==
- Fire & Movement #89
- The Wargamer #16
