= Power and Resolution =

English Civil War board wargame

Power and Resolution, subtitled "A Study of the English Civil War, 1642–1651", is a board wargame published by Simulations Canada in 1984 that simulates the English Civil War.

== Description ==
Power and Resolution is a board wargame for 2–4 players in which players control Royalist forces under King Charles I; Parliamentarian forces under Oliver Cromwell; Ireland; and Scotland.

The game includes a hex grid map of England, Scotland and part of Ireland, scaled at 19 miles (31 km) per hex, as well as 200 counters and an 8-page rulebook.

The short 8-page rulebook covers recruitment, supply, negotiations, attrition, sieges, naval operations, and leaders.

=== Scenarios ===
The game comes with four scenarios:

1. First Civil War (Fall 1642–Spring 1646): The player accumulating the most Victory Points wins
2. Second Civil War (Spring 1948–Winter 1649): The most Victory Points wins except if Parliament has the most Victory Points but does not control all towns in England; in this case, the game is a draw.
3. Reduction of Ireland (Summer 1649–Spring 1650): Parliament wins if it controls all Irish towns by end of scenario; otherwise, Ireland wins.
4. Reduction of Scotland (Summer 1650–Summer 1651): Parliament wins if it controls all Scottish towns by end of scenario; otherwise, Scotland wins.

There is also a Campaign game that combines all four scenarios, covering Fall 1642–Fall 1651; the winner is the player accumulating the most Victory Points. However, if at anytime during the game Parliament loses control of London, then the game is immediately won by the faction that successfully took over London.

== Publication history ==
Stephen Newberg designed Power and Resolution, which was then published by Simulations Canada in 1984 with a print run of 1000 copies.

Newberg later commented, "Though Power and Resolution works well as a military representation of the war, I do not feel it captured the color and sense of moment of the events."

== Reception ==
In Issue 102 of Strategy & Tactics, Charles Vasey thought the game's "political rules are quite good, with the beginnings of a nice idea in the concession counters." Vasey, a British writer, didn't feel the game was at all historically accurate, concluding, "Any hope of success in this area, however, is dealt a blow by the lack of historicity around movement and combat."

In a retrospective review in Issue 10 of Simulacrum, John Nebauer agreed with Vasey's assessment of the political rules, saying, "The negotiations segment is a good attempt to capture the political flavour of the campaign, and recognises that military operations were often driven by political needs." Nebauer concluded, "Power and Resolution is a playable and interesting working of the topic that can generally be played in a single sitting. If you're interested in the topic this is certainly worth getting."

== Other reviews and commentary ==
- The Grenadier #27
- Perfidious Albion #66
