= Scourge of God (wargame) =

Medieval board wargame

- Cover art by John Kula
- Designers: Steve Newberg
- Illustrators: John Kula
- Publishers: Simulations Canada
- Publication: 1982

Scourge of God, subtitled "The Campaigns of the Mongolians, 1206–1259 AD", is a board wargame published by Simulations Canada in 1982 that simulates the Mongolian invasions of China, the Middle East and Europe.

== Description ==
Scourge of God is a board wargame for two players in which one controls the Mongolian invaders, and the other (called the "Empires player") controls the various and disparate opponents of the Mongolians.

The game includes a hex grid map of Eastern Europe and Asia as well as 200 counters and a 12-page rulebook.

=== Gameplay ===
Each empire remains inactive until attacked by the Mongols. Once a country has been comprehensively defeated by the Mongols, the Mongols can recruit more armies to continue their advance. The game lasts 11 turns, and leaves the Empires player with very little to do, since it is the Mongolian player who moves, attacks and decides on strategy. The rules suggest that at the end of the game, the players switch sides and play another game, with the player who performed best while in charge of the Mongolians declared the winner. Some critics suggested that Scourge of God should be played as a solitaire game.

== Publication history ==
Stephen Newberg created Scourge of God, which was then published by Simulations Canada in 1982 featuring cover art by John Kula, with a print run of 1000 copies.

In 2018, Compass Games republished Scourge of God as a free pull-out game in Issue 88 of Paper Wars.

== Reception ==
In Issue 53 of the British wargaming magazine Perfidious Albion, Charles Vasey pointed out that designer Steve Newberg, in previous games, displayed "a brevity that borders on the brusque in his rule-writing and a lack of game atmosphere. Steve delivers exactly what the game says with a lack of imagination of almost Swiss intensity." But Vasey found Scourge of God to be "quite an improvement ... Steve has designed a game that plays fast and furiously." Vasey thought the historical accuracy of the game to be "accurate in a very broad-brush manner and fulfils the basic terms of the brief Steve describes in his design notes ... [But] the game lacks a greater historicity because it is so simplistic." Vasey concluded, "The game assumes Mongol success and leaves it to you to determine its limits, no more and no less. It tells you little about why they won, or why they did anything, you just keep going."

In Issue 26 of The Wargamer, Mark McLaughlin thought "Simulations Canada has done a reasonably good job of simulating the strategic aspect of the great Mongol invasions of China, the Middle East and Eastern Europe, but they have not made that simulation very exciting." McLaughlin found the game components were "of a mixed quality ... The map is dull, the counters are silhouettes of either infantry or horse archers. There are no leaders, navies, fortifications, etc." McLaughlin concluded, "Scourge of God is a good, quick, solitaire game but should not be played by two players as the player currently in charge of empires is little more than an occasional die-roller. It would make a good computer game."

In Issue 38 of Fire & Movement, Omar DeWitt complained that "It is tough to succeed as a Mongol, and all too often I felt the backlash of his scourge. If raping and pillaging are as difficult as this, I'll stay in the teaching profession."

== Other commentary and references ==
- The Grenadier #20
- Perfidious Albion #61
