= Man of War (wargame) =

1983 Age of Sail board wargame

Man of War, subtitled "A Game of Fleet Combat in the Age of Sail, 1775–1815", is a board wargame published by Simulations Canada in 1983 that simulates fleet and squadron naval engagements during the Age of Sail.

== Description ==
Man of War is a two-person wargame in which players control opposing fleets or squadrons of wooden-hulled ships. Tactics and command structure simulate those used by European navies from the start of the American Revolution to the end of the Napoleonic Wars.

The game includes a hex grid map scaled at 250 metres (270 yd) per hex. Other components include 400 double-sided counters and a 12-page rule book.

=== Gameplay ===
The turn sequence is unusual for board wargames of the time:

1. Both players determine the movement of each of their units. The highest rate of movement becomes the number of movement segments in the turn.
2. Players check each damaged ship in close proximity to the enemy to see if it strikes its colours.
3. The first movement segment:
  1. Ships move simultaneously
  2. Each ship may fire one or both broadsides at enemy ships that are within range. (Ships with better crew quality may be able to fire multiple broadsides during the following movement segments of the same turn.)
4. More movement segments until the number of movement determined at the start of the turn is reached. Play then moves to the next turn.

=== Movement ===
The Fighting Instructions of the time required ships to follow the maneuvers of the admiral's flagship unless engaged in close combat. The game rules follow this closely: Ships not in close engagement with the enemy are required to move in concert with their flagship, and flagships must do the same if there is a fleet flagship. If a flagship becomes engaged in battle, all ships under that command are free to maneuver freely in engaging the enemy.

=== Scenarios ===
Ten historical scenarios are provided, including the Battle of Ushant in 1778, The Glorious 1st of June, the Battle of Cape St. Vincent, the Battle of Camperdown, and the Battle of Trafalgar. The rules also provide guidelines for how to design a scenario.

== Publication history ==
Game designer Stephen Newberg was disappointed by naval combat games, finding them games for single ship engagements and not suitable for fleet engagements. Newberg designed his own game, Man of War, which was published in 1983 by Simulations Canada with a print run of 1000 copies.

Newberg later wrote, "Man of War was a design I really did for me, and we then packaged it for publication. I was happy with it at the time and still am. It remains the best command level board game on the topic available."

The game proved popular, and ten years after its publication, Simulations Canada republished it as a computer game titled Man of War: Under Sail 1765–1815.

In 1997 Strategy First redeveloped the computer game and released it as Man of War. This was followed by a sequel in 1999, Man of War II.

== Reception ==
In Issue 42 of Fire & Movement, John Burtt commented, "I found myself thinking back over each game, wondering if I could have maneuvered my fleet better, or whether my squadron composition had been correct ... in short, wondering what any admiral would wonder after a battle. And that is as good a comment as I can make about Man of War." Burtt concluded, "If you are into single-ship actions, stick with Wooden Ships and Iron Men. But if you are interested in fleet actions, Man of War is a game worth a look."

In a retrospective review in Issue 10 of Simulacrum, Nicholas Russon wrote, "In summary, I am very pleased with the game: although I have not played all the scenarios, the game results seem to be in line with the historical results. The game does not require huge amounts of bookkeeping for the scale of the action. Mr. Newburg balanced this design very well and, I think, achieved his aims admirably."

In Issue 112 of Computer Gaming World, M. Evan Brooks reviewed the computer game based on the board wargame, noting that this was the first computer game by Simulations Canada to have graphics, but then pointing out "They are not state-of-the art ... the display is static; one cannot zoom in for a more detailed rendition of a particular section, and this presents a problem. While one can order a unit to move to a specific location, determining the proper coordinates can be difficult; therefore, one will usually order a course change based on bearing (direction) only." Brooks was disappointed that only a limited area is available for the combat, writing, "Although battles occur at sea, the battle arena is limited and the 'edge of the world' syndrome applies ... Why a moving ocean replenishment map was not employed is unknown, and often somewhat artificial maneuvers are required to avoid 'falling off the edge.'" Brooks concluded. "While this presents an ostensibly accurate simulation, it does not present an entertaining game ... MoW is a simulation of limited appeal. While aficionados of the topic may want to have it to add to their collection, they should know that its short-term interest may not lend itself to long-term enjoyment."
