= La Regia Marina (wargame) =

WWII board wargame

- Cover art by John Kula
- Designers: Stephen Newberg
- Illustrators: John Kula
- Publishers: Simulations Canada
- Publication: 1983
- Genres: WWII

La Regia Marina, (Italian: The Royal Navy), subtitled "A Strategic Study of the Naval War in the Mediterranean & Black Sea, 1940–1943", is a board wargame published by Simulations Canada in 1983 that simulates the air and naval war in the Mediterranean and the Black Sea during World War II. It was designed to be mated to a previous Simulations Canada about the North African Campaign, D.A.K., to produce a large combined game about the entire theatre.

== Description ==
La Regia Marina is a two-person wargame in which one player controls Allied forces and the other controls Axis forces. The hex grid map shows the Mediterranean Sea and the Black Sea. Both players receive victory points for sinking enemy shipping, but also for convoys that safely reach their North African destinations. If this game is being combined with D.A.K., those supplies are then made available to units fighting in North Africa.

Each player receives shipping points each turn, and secretly assigns them and a destination to their convoys. All counters are placed facedown until either engaged in combat or until revealed by searches done by opposing naval units. For this reason, each player does not know what convoys are going where, and how large each convoy is. As critic Clayton Baisch noted, "The guessing game involved here can add some suspense and tension, unless your opponent happens to be Kreskin."

Vessels can be sunk during combat, but can also be damaged. Damaged vessels are removed from play for the number of turns equal to the damage received.

=== Possible strategies ===
Critic Clayton Baisch suggested, "Though victory points are awarded for sinking ships, the Axis player will probably gain the most points from safely offloading cargoes to the front lines over the perilous shipping lanes. The Allied player gets points not only for sinking ships, but also big points for any of three different convoys reaching their destination. These should the be the main Axis target of attack."

== Publication history ==
Stephen Newberg designed La Regia Marina as a companion to his previous game D.A.K. that simulated the land campaign in North Africa. Simulations Canada published it in 1983 featuring cover art by John Kula, and the print run of 1000 copies sold out.

== Reception ==
In Issue 38 of Fire & Movement, Jay Selover liked this game, saying, "La Regia Marina would probably stand up pretty well even if there was significant competition with which to compare it."

In a retrospective review in Issue 10 of Simulacrum, Clayton Baisch wrote, "In all this game looks like a good companion to SimCan's D.A.K. and could possibly be fitted to many other North Africa campaign games that have variable supply rates."
