= The Battle for Madrid =

The Battle for Madrid is a 1976 wargame published by JagdPanther Publications.

== Gameplay ==
The Battle for Madrid is a game in which combat in Spain is depicted.

== Reception ==
Charles Vasey reviewed The Battle for Madrid in Perfidious Albion #14 (February 1977) and stated that "A neat, simple, game with many advantages over the Quads which are its main rivals."
