= Seventh Fleet (disambiguation) =

The United States Seventh Fleet is a numbered fleet of the U.S. Navy.

Seventh (or 7th) Fleet may also refer to:

- 7th Fleet (Imperial Japanese Navy), during World War II
- Seventh Fleet (video game), a 1985 computer game
