= Main Battle Tank: Middle East =

1991 video game

- Publisher(s): Simulations Canada
- Release: 1991

Main Battle Tank: Middle East is a 1991 video game published by Simulations Canada.

== Gameplay ==
Main Battle Tank: Middle East is a game in which the player is a modern brigade commander involved in armored combat. Players can play in scenarios from different time periods for various conflicts between local powers in the desert terrain of the Middle East. Players can choose to challenge each other or the computer, and order their units into combat where they make tactical decisions as the battles occur. The game comes with several different scenarios, and includes a scenario editor.

== Publication history ==
Middle East is a follow-up to Main Battle Tank: Central Germany.

== Reception ==
Joe Sherfy reviewed the game for Computer Gaming World, and stated that "MBTME and its sister programs by SimCan are unique. They are not recommended for those looking solely for 'awesome graphics.' Instead, despite some shortcomings, they are recommended to those fans of traditional board wargames who remember how much fun they had playing Panzerblitz or Panzerleader. The Main Battle Tank series, because of its use of limited intelligence and 'post mortem' features, is the next step."

The PC Games Bible identifies how "Sim Can products are very specialist, effectively a computer moderated board game, no graphics, text driven, and complex. They show the most amazing depth and realism, but will be considered far too dry and boring, by anything other than a real committed strategist."
