= Warring States (wargame) =

1979 board wargame set in Ancient China

Cover art by Rodger B. MacGowan

Warring States, subtitled "The Unification of China, 231–221 BC", is a board wargame published by Simulations Canada in 1979 that simulates the campaigns of Qin Shi Huang to unify the many minor kingdoms of China into one state.

== Description ==
Warring States is a board wargame for 2–7 players in which each player is a Chinese king or warlord trying to win control of China.

The game includes a hex grid map of China scaled at 47 kilometres (29 mi) per hex, as well as 255 double-sided counters and a 12-page rulebook.

=== Gameplay ===
As critic Brian Train noted almost 25 years after this game's publication, "Sun Tze's Art of War plays a large part in the military philosophies and methods of this game. In summary: 'All warfare is based on deception. There has never been a protracted war from which a country has benefitted. To subdue the enemy without fighting is the acme of skill. What is of supreme importance in war is to attack the enemy's strategy. Next best is to disrupt his alliances. Next best is to attack his army. The worst policy is to attack his cities.'"

== Publication history ==
Game designer Stephen Newberg became interested in the life of the first Chinese emperor, Qin Shi Huang, when he read about the terra cotta army that had been created for the emperor's tomb. Newberg subsequently created the game Warring States, which was then published by Simulations Canada in 1979 with cover art by Rodger B. MacGowan and a print run of 1000 copies.

== Reception ==
In Issue 49 of the British wargaming magazine Perfidious Albion, Charles Vasey did not like the physical components, writing, "If you can stand the boring map and remember if you are Wing or Wong then the game has impressive ideas."

In Issue 78 of Strategy & Tactics, game designer Richard Berg commented, "At last! A game on pre-Mao China! The game is actually quite simple, and can be either two player or multi-player. It borrows much from old diplomacy-style games (production, assassination) and as a result there is little flavour of ancient China. At least it's a step in the right direction."

In Issue 21 of Fire & Movement, Ed Coe called this game, "a clever blend of old and new ideas in a game that requires no gymnasium or decade to play. What problems exist are very minor and do not hinder one’s enjoyment of the simulation." Coe concluded, "As relations between The United States and Communist China continue to warm, Warring States increases in interest because of the light it helps to shed on the military background of the world's most populous nation. I believe Warring States to be one of the better games of 1979."
