= Northern Fleet (disambiguation) =

Northern Fleet may refer to:

== Fleets ==
- Northern Fleet, Soviet and Russian fleet based on the White and Barents Seas
- Northern Fleet (Iran), Iranian fleet in the Caspian Sea
- Northern Fleet (English Navy), medieval English fleet in the North Sea

== Other ==
- Northern Fleet Joint Strategic Command (Russia), former name of the Russian Northern Military District
- Northern Fleet (video game)

== See also ==
- Northern Afleet, a racehorse
