= Rockets' Red Glare =

Rockets' Red Glare and similar phrases could refer to:

- "...Rockets' Red Glare...", a phrase from the national anthem of the United States, "The Star-Spangled Banner"
- Rocket's Red Glare, a 2000 American television film
- Rockets Red Glare, Canadian alternative rock band
- Rockets Redglare (1949–2001), born Michael Morra, American character actor and stand-up comedian
- The Rockets' Red Glare: When America Goes to War, the Presidents and the People, a 1990 book by Richard Barnet
- Rockets Red Glare (wargame), 1980 board wargame that simulates the War of 1812

== See also ==
- Red Rockets Glare, a recording studio in Los Angeles, California
- Rocket Red, a fictional character in the DC Comics Universe
