= Raketny Kreyser =

Naval board wargame published in 1977

Raketny Kreyser (Russian for "missile cruiser"), subtitled "Tactical Naval Combat, 1975-1999", is a naval board wargame published in 1977 by Simulations Canada (SimCan) that simulates hypothetical naval battles in the latter part of the twentieth century.

== Description ==
Raketny Kreyser is a two-player tactical naval wargame involving naval armaments considered modern in 1977, as well as hypothesized armaments and ship capabilities in the 1980s and 90s. The scenarios are drawn from geo-political troubles of the 1970s such as the Cold War, and oil shipments through the Straits of Hormuz. Ships and aircraft are drawn from the U.S., the U.S.S.R., the U.K., China, Canada, Turkey, Greece, Norway, Denmark, Sweden, West Germany, East Germany, Poland, Finland, Iraq, Iran, North and South Korea, Japan, Taiwan, Italy, India, and France.

=== Gameplay ===
The game has 255 die-cut counters, but only a few are used in each scenario. The rulebook is only 12 pages long, and the rules have been characterized as "simple."

== Publication history ==
In 1977, Steve Newberg founded Simulations Canada and released three of his games: Dieppe; The Peloponnesian War; and Raketny Kreyser. All three games were packaged in ziplock bags. Newberg characterized Raketny Kreyser as "the simple game of the three." Only 550 copies of the game were printed, and those quickly sold out. Newberg was not surprised, having noted that "It is simple mechanically, on a subject of much current interest, very attractive ... and fast, furious and fun to play."

Newberg later admitted the game was too simple, and he reworked the modern naval combat concept to produce a similarly themed SimCan game titled Battle Stations in 1984.

== Reception ==
In Issue 23 of the British wargaming magazine Perfidious Albion, Cliff Sayre found "The rules are simple and the game system is fast-moving with a five-turn game lasting about 1 hour and fifteen minutes." Sayre was confused by the 22-hex minimum movement restriction on aircraft, calling it "kind of meaningless unless more fully explained." Sayre concluded by calling on Simulations Canada to ensure better playtesting, but admitted, "All things considered it is an interesting initial effort, nicely done by a designer who has some creative ideas to offer the hobby."

Two reviews of this game appeared in Issue 10 of Fire & Movement. Although John Vanore found some minor flaws in the rules, he summarized them by calling the game "both playable and realistic. Once you become accustomed to rolling for systems reliability, you'll find the game moves quickly. Don’t let my elaborating on a few minor technical flaws deter you from this excellent game." Cliff Sayre also liked the game, commenting, "The game system is easy to learn and yet involves some innovative features which add interest without penalizing playability."

In The Guide to Simulations/Games for Education and Training, Martin Campion called it, "A broad spectrum survey of the naval and naval air units that would be engaged in any major world conflict from now until the turn of the century."

In a retrospective review in Issue 10 of Simulacrum, Chris Nelson found several major flaws, pointing out that

- No ships smaller than frigates were included in the game when several scenarios involved places where smaller ships would have been used.
- Several scenarios involve nations exchanging nuclear missile strikes on land, but noted "the game does not include any rules for nuclear combat at sea."
- The scenarios with American aircraft carriers "are implausible since it is very unlikely that Soviet warships would be able to get so close without being engaged by the carriers' tactical aircraft."
- "The ranges of various weapons are too great and the lack of ammunition limits for ships or planes is unrealistic."

Nelson concluded, "Although a simple and quick playing game, it fails to capture the flavor of modern naval combat."

== Reviews ==
- Perfidious Albion #25 (February 1978) p. 11
