= Beachhead (board game) =

Cover art by Rodger B. MacGowan, 1980

Beachhead, subtitled "A Game of Island Invasions in the South Pacific 1942–1944", is a board wargame published by Yaquinto Publications in 1980 that simulates amphibious landings in the Pacific Theatre during World War II.

== Gameplay ==
Beachhead is a two-player wargame in which one player controls American forces trying to make an amphibious landing, and the other player controls the Japanese defenders. The game is packaged in an LP record-style folder, with a generic hex grid map of a beach backed by jungle printed on the inside cover. Four hundred counters represent various infantry units as well as machine gunners, tanks and other combat equipment. An American "hero" counter, "Sgt. Stryker", can be used to provide close combat attack bonuses.

=== Setup ===
The Japanese player sets up their units facedown so that the American player cannot know the types of units and strengths. The American units are placed face up.

=== Movement and combat ===
The game system uses an alternating system of turns. Each game turn, the players roll dice for initiative, the winner going first. The two players have the following phases:

- American
  - Bombardment, Airstrikes, Indirect Fire
  - Direct Fire
  - Movement
  - Close Assault
- Japanese
  - Indirect fire
  - Direct fire
  - Movement

When both players have gone, this completes one game turn, representing 20 minutes of game time.

Additional optional rules include Banzai charges, smoke and close assaults.

=== Scenarios ===
The two scenarios simulate a generic (non-historic) amphibious landing on a small Pacific island, using a non-specific map of a jungle beach printed on the inside cover of the game folder. The two scenarios are:

- "Opposed Landing": The Americans try to land and force their way off the beachhead against a prepared defense.
- "Banzai!": The Japanese defenders try to use a Banzai charge to retake a jungle plantation.

=== Victory conditions ===
In the "Opposed Landing" scenario, the American player wins by earning a predetermined number of victory points, which are accumulated for each unit that crosses a predetermined terrain line, indicating that the unit has moved off the beachhead. The Japanese player wins by preventing this.

In the "Banzai!" scenario, the Japanese win by retaking the plantation before the end of the game. The American wins by preventing this.

== Publication history ==
In 1980, Yaquinto released four wargames packaged in LP-style folders, with the maps printed on the inside cover of the folder, one of them being Beachhead, a game designed by Michael Matheny, with cover art by Rodger B. MacGowan.

== Reception ==
In Issue 31 of The Space Gamer Nick Schuessler found the "Physical quality of the components is excellent" and that "except for the bulge of the counters, the [LP folder packaging] works fairly well." He did question the replayability of the game, noting, "With the limited number of scenarios and the fixed map, it is possible that Beachhead might 'wear out'." Despite this, Schuessler concluded on a positive note, saying, "[Game designer Michael] Matheny has given us a good, solid design. He avoided the error of taking European combat and calling the trees 'jungle' instead of 'forest.' The landing craft rules demonstrate the problems of amphibious invasion. Beachhead moves the 'beer and pretzels' game up to the 'dry white and cheese' level - a hearty offering with delicate overtones. Highly recommended as one of the best values of 1980."

In Issue 101 of Campaign, Kevin Pollock called Beachhead "perhaps the most interesting of the four [Yaquinto] games released in this [LP folder] format." Although Pollock admired the quality of the components, he was not a fan of the LP folder, saying that "the problem of unit [counter] storage, however, will persist as long as the games are packaged this way." Pollock also liked the facedown Japanese markers at the start of each scenario, but thought that Japanese placement should be completely hidden, otherwise "The Americans will still know where to bombard." He concluded, "I like Beachhead. It's tough for the Japanese, if they don't stop the Americans on the beaches, but the challenge is too good to pass up. Just finding an optimum setup for the Japanese can be a game in itself. That's quite a bit for only $7.00."

Joseph Miranda reviewed the game for Fire & Movement and felt the sides were mostly balanced by differing advantages. The Japanese player benefited from hidden units while the American player could use overwhelming fire support, albeit risking running out of time to take their objectives if they fired for too long. Miranda felt banzai charges were over-modelled but the American player could often win despite heavy losses, and concluded "not a bad effort."
