= After Pearl =

1984 video game

- Title screen
- Publisher: SUPERware
- Platform: Atari
- Release: 1984
- Genre: Warfare

After Pearl is a 1984 video game published by SUPERware.

== Gameplay ==
After Pearl simulates naval warfare in the Pacific theatre of World War II.

== Reception ==
Bob DeWitt reviewed the game for Computer Gaming World, stating "for those who are not dyed-in-the-wool wargamers, and who simply enjoy strategic planning and maneuvering without a lot of detail, this game may prove to be a mental exercise in the power of position."

== Reviews ==
- Review in Current Notes
- Review in Atari Computer Enthusiasts
- Fire & Movement #76
