= Warring States (disambiguation) =

Warring States may refer to:

== Historical ==
- Warring States period, second period of the Eastern Zhou Dynasty of ancient China
  - Seven Warring States, the seven major states of the period
- Record of the Warring States, a work compiled in the Han dynasty, from which the Warring States period derives its name
- Sengoku period or Warring States period of Japan
- Italian Wars
- American Civil War

== Movies ==
- The Warring States (film), 2011 film based on the Chinese Warring States period

== Books ==
- Warring States, a novel by Mags L. Halliday

== Games ==
- Warring States (wargame), a 1979 board wargame that simulates the Chinese Warring States period
