= Quebec Libre =

Political board game

Quebec Libre (a French phrase meaning "Free Quebec", taken from the phrase "Vive le Quebec libre" uttered by French president Charles DeGaulle during a visit to Canada in 1967) is a board game published by Simulations Canada in 1978 that simulates the political breakdown of Canada. The game, Simulations Canada's only non-military board game, failed to find an audience.

== Background ==
The British North America Act 1867 passed by the British government created Canada as a confederation of provinces acting together as an independent country. The act also defined the powers and responsibilities of the federal government, such as foreign policy, armed forces and customs, as well as those of the provincial governments, such as resources and education.

A century later an independence movement grew in Quebec based on the province's linguistic and cultural differences. Although some sought independence through violence, as exemplified by the militant Front de libération du Québec (FLQ), others felt that independence could be achieved through political means. When the Parti Quebecois rose to power in Quebec under René Lévesque in 1976, they promised to bring a referendum to the Quebec voters asking if Quebec should leave the Canadian confederation.

== Description ==
Quebec Libre is a board game of cooperation and conflict for 2–6 players in which players control various areas of Canada, and must negotiate with each other, either openly or privately, for funding, popular support and power, as each player grapples with standard of living, popularity, unemployment, energy, production, taxation, consumption, exports, and development.

During the game, random events can cause uncertainty and upset even careful planning, strategy and forethought.

== Publication history ==
The rise of the separatist Parti Quebecois in 1976 proved to be a topic of interest to wargamers for a short period. The American wargame manufacturer Simulations Publications Inc. published Canadian Civil War in 1977, and Simulations Canada, a Canadian wargame publisher, released Quebec Libre the following year. It was Simulations Canada's only non-military board game, and very few of the 1000 copies that had been printed were sold. The company's usual audience of wargamers were not interested in a political board game, and Simulations Canada failed to attract anyone else to the game. Quebec Libre's designer, Steve Newberg, later recalled "it did not sell worth beans. We ended up giving the last couple of hundred away to the school system as a simple model of the Canadian system."

== Reception ==
In Issue 23 of Fire & Movement, David Isby liked the game, saying it was "a worthwhile and valid model … an accurate simulation of Canadian politics, which are evolutionary, not revolutionary. [Designer Steve] Newberg stresses the disparate goals of the regions through cunningly constructed victory conditions." Isby's one complaint was the lack of background information for non-Canadians, writing, "Quebec Libre presents only a few notes for background … it would have done well to expand upon the textual material." Isby concluded, "Quebec Libre is a valid, complete lesson in Canadian geographical-economic political realities.

In a retrospective review in Issue 10 of Simulacrum, Steve Carey wrote "A precursor to the German/Euro type of games that are so popular today, Quebec Libre can offer an interesting gaming experience, even for those who are not enthralled with the topic." Isby did not like the game components, noting, "The game's counters and map are best described as functional, with some of the colored markers being difficult to read." Carey concluded with a warning: "Though the economic system in Quebec Libre is very simplified it is not necessarily immediately understandable. First time players should expect confusion to dominate their first game and the system encourages such a situation for the first two turns even after experience with the system. Forward planning is essential and should be done during the Negotiations Phase of the preceding turn."
