= Harm's Way =

Harm's Way or In Harm's Way may refer to:

== Films ==
- Harm's Way (1995), a short film starring Charlotte Sullivan
- Harm's Way (2006), a thriller film starring Kathleen Quinlan
- In Harm's Way (1965), a film based on the Bassett's novel
- In Harm's Way (2017 film), a Chinese war drama also known as The Chinese Widow
- Into Harm's Way (2012), an American documentary about the West Point class of 1967

== Literature ==
- Harm's Way (novel), a 1962 war novel by James Bassett
- Harm's Way (1993), a sci-fi/fantasy novel by Colin Greenland
- In Harm's Way: The Sinking of the U.S.S. Indianapolis and the Extraordinary Story of Its Survivors (2003), a non-fiction book by Doug Stanton

== Music ==
- Harm's Way (band), an American hardcore band that formed in 2006
- Harm's Way (album), a 2024 album by Ducks Ltd.
- "Harms Way", a song by Anthrax from their album Volume 8: The Threat Is Real (1998)
- "In Harm's Way", a song by Converge from their album When Forever Comes Crashing (1998)
- "In Harm's Way", a song from the album Rehab by Quiet Riot (2006)
- "In Harm's Way", a 2017 single by Amanda Palmer

== Television ==
- "Harm's Way" (Angel), a 2004 episode of the television series Angel
- In Harm's Way (TV series), a 2008 reality television series

== Other entertainment and media ==
- Harms Way, a 2010 video game
- In Harm's Way (video game), a 1988 video game
- "In Harm's Way", a 2004 episode of the fan-created Internet series Star Trek: New Voyages
