= Le Grand Empire =

1979 Napoleonic board wargame

Cover of the rulebook, artwork by Rodger B. MacGowan, 1978

Le Grand Empire, subtitled "France and Napoleon, 1795-1815", is a strategic board wargame of conquest published by Simulations Canada in 1978 that simulates the European and global wars during the reign of Napoleon.

== Description ==
Le Grand Empire is a board wargame set in Europe, the Mediterranean and India in the late 18th century, where players representing the major European powers attempt to conquer other countries. With only seven pages of rules, it is not a complex game; designer Steve Newberg noted that it was designed to be "easy to play."

=== Gameplay ===
Each turn represents one year, and the game lasts for twenty years. Military campaigns are dependent on an annual stipend of supplies. Critic Nicky Palmer called the combat system "rudimentary": each unit involved in a combat counts as one point. Once a simple ratio of attacker to defender is established, the attacker rolls a die. Leaders Napoleon and Admiral Nelson modify the die roll.

The game can be played by two players, one controlling France and the other controlling England and Austria.

All other countries are neutral, and cannot be traversed. A neutral country can be turned into an ally if a player conquers the neutral country. For two turns (two years), the victorious player can use the new ally's armies. But after two years, the ally returns to being neutral. The armies of the player who used to be an ally can now cross the neutral country, but the player no longer can use its armies (unless the player reconquers the neutral country.)

The game can also be a multi-player game, with the players controlling the major European powers, much like Diplomacy.

=== Victory conditions ===
In the two-player game, France can draw by controlling Paris and either London, Moscow or Bombay. If France can also take Alexandria, France wins. England/Austria wins by preventing a French draw or victory.

== Publication history ==
Le Grand Empire was designed by Steve Newberg and published by Simulations Canada in 1978 as a ziplock bag game, with rulebook artwork by Rodger B. MacGowan. The first printing of 1000 sold out. A further printing of 500 also sold out. No further printings were made.

== Reception ==
In his 1980 book The Best of Board Wargaming, Nick Palmer didn't think France stood much of a chance in the two-player game, and predicted the unlikely course of events that would have to take place in order for France to win. Palmer thought that "The multi-player game looks more interesting than this preordained course of events, but the fun of a free-for-all erodes the historical plausibility while giving the French a better chance." Palmer concluded by giving Le Grand Empire an Excitement grade of only 40%.

Strategy & Tactics thought Le Grand Empire was more of a "beer & pretzels" game, saying, "The game is pretty simple (and somewhat simplistic) and could probably be played in a long evening, depending on how many players are involved. Long on game, short on simulation."

In Issue 52 of Moves, Ian Chadwick thought that the initial game set up was "poorly explained in the rules." Chadwick was also disappointed in the lack of short scenarios, saying that one long game ignored the style of warfare at the time, which had periods of intense activity, followed by months or years of relative peace. He likened the game to "France's Revolutionary Army attempting to conquer Europe. While the early game may bear some vague historical likeness, it degenerates into a mid- and endgame far removed from Napoleonic aims and warfare." Chadwick concluded by giving the game grades of "C" for Playability, "C" for Historical Accuracy, and "D" for Component Quality, saying, "The game does not live up to the designer's objectives, let alone a historical veracity. Instead of a Napoleonic game, it plays more like a slow Blitzkrieg. The game fails both as a simulation and as a game — a sad product from an otherwise good producer."

In a retrospective review in Issue 10 of Simulacrum, John Kula commented, "Le Grand Empire is one of the few games that deals with the entire Napoleonic period. Unfortunately, it was a simple game released at a time when gamers were demanding ever larger and more complex simulations. Thus the fact that it was not a critical success should not be surprising, even though it was being measured against standards that clearly were not applicable.
