= Long Lance: A Computer Game of Tactical Naval Combat in the South Pacific =

1987 video game

- Publisher: Simulations Canada
- Platforms: Apple II, Atari ST, Commodore 64
- Release: 1987
- Genre: Wargame

Long Lance: A Computer Game of Tactical Naval Combat in the South Pacific is a 1987 video game published by Simulations Canada.

== Gameplay ==
Long Lance is a game in which naval combat is simulated during World War II.

== Reception ==
Johnny L. Wilson reviewed the game for Computer Gaming World, and stated that "Long Lance delivers exciting and challenging games without the graphics or sophisticated sound."
