= Grand Fleet (video game) =

1988 video game

- Developer(s): Simulations Canada
- Publisher(s): Simulations Canada
- Platform(s): Amiga, Atari ST, DOS
- Release: 1988
- Genre(s): Wargame

Grand Fleet is a 1988 video game published by Simulations Canada.

== Gameplay ==
Grand Fleet is a game in which players command the flagships of their respective fleet, the British Home Fleet based at Scapa Flow, and the German Fleet based in Jade Bay.

== Reception ==
Lt. H.E. Dille reviewed the game for Computer Gaming World, and stated that "Overall, this product is recommended for dedicated wargamers and enthusiasts of the historical period covered, but may prove too involved and time-consuming for "weekend warriors"."
