= Malta Storm =

1989 video game

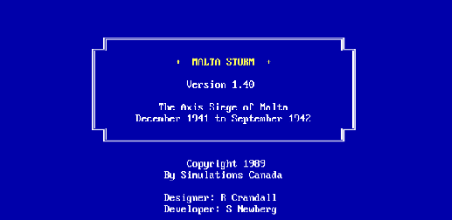
- Developer: Simulations Canada
- Publisher: Simulations Canada
- Platforms: Amiga, Atari ST, MS-DOS
- Release: 1989
- Genre: Turn-based strategy

Malta Storm, subtitled "The Axis Siege of Malta", is a turn-based strategy computer wargame published in 1989 by Simulations Canada for the Amiga, Atari ST, and MS-DOS. The game simulates the battle for the central Mediterranean during World War II.

== Gameplay ==
Malta Storm is an operational and strategic game in which the Axis powers attempt to take control of the central Mediterranean by defeating the British forces on the island of Malta. The game also covers the later stages of the war after the end of the siege.

The game can be a two-player alternating turn contest, or a one-player game where the computer can play either the Axis or Allied side.

Game box, floppy disk, and hex grid map

As with many Simulations Canada computer games, the game is text-only, and a hex grid map and counters are packaged with the game to allow the players to see visually what is happening in the game.

== Development ==
Simulations Canada had started in the 1970s publishing board wargames. With the rise of the personal computer in the early 1980s, SimCan began to create text-only computer wargames that included a hex grid map and counters. One of these was Malta Storm, created by Stephen Newberg, programmed by Robert Crandall and published in 1989 with box art by John Kula.

== Reception ==
Sam Punnett reviewed the game for Computer Gaming World, and stated that "As a pure entertainment product, many will feel the limitations placed by Malta Storm's design and lack of chrome makes it a less than desirable game for the casual gamer. As a command study, however, Malta Storm has plenty to offer aficionados of military history who are more concerned with strategy than presentation."
