= Dark Stars (board game) =

1980 board game

Dark Stars is a 1980 board game published by Simulations Canada.

== Gameplay ==
Dark Stars is a game involving the exploration and colonization of a globular cluster where the intruding Terrans interfere in a rivalry between three races native to the region.

== Reception ==
William A. Barton reviewed Dark Stars in The Space Gamer No. 42. Barton commented that "Overall, while Dark Stars might prove a moderately interesting diversion for those who don't mind having to improvise a bit on rules and who wish a change from Stellar Conquest or other such games, its faults, coupled with its overinflated [...] price tag, are enough that most gamers should be advised to look elsewhere."

Steve List reviewed Dark Stars in Ares Magazine #8 and commented that "the game is only half-cooked. The essential idea behind it is good and parts of the design are very nice, but on the whole it is underdeveloped and not terribly well produced as a physical artifact. If you like to tinker with game designs, but it, for you're sure to find lots of things to elaborate on. However, if you want a complete product, look elsewhere."

Eric Goldberg reviewed Dark Stars in Ares Magazine #8 and commented that "Dark Stars is essentially a simple, time-consuming, solitaire exercise. Interplayer contact is discouraged by the system, which makes sense in light of the rationale. I cannot say the game is very rewarding face-to-face, but it should be an excellent play-by-mail vehicle."
