= The Punic Wars: Rome vs Carthage, 264-146 B.C. =

Board wargame published in 1975

Strategy & Tactics #53 containing The Punic Wars. Cover art: "Hannibal's army crossing the Rhône" by Henri-Paul Motte, 1878

The Punic Wars: Rome vs Carthage, 264-146 B.C., is a board wargame published by Simulations Publications, Inc. (SPI) in 1975 that simulates the three Punic Wars between Rome and Carthage from 264–146 BCE.

== Background ==
In the 3rd century BCE, Carthage was the dominant naval power in the Western Mediterranean, while Rome was an up-and-coming land power in the Italian peninsula. In 264 BCE war broke out between the two over the island of Sicily, controlled by Carthage. Rome was the eventual victor.

The Second Punic War started in 218 BCE, with extensive fighting in Spain, and also in Italy when Hannibal crossed the Alps. It lasted 14 years and ended with Roman victory, ensuring that Rome was the dominant power in the Mediterranean basin, while Carthage's influence shrunk to its city and environs.

The Third Punic War was started in 151 BCE by Rome on a pretext after Carthage broke a treaty with Rome, and resulted in the complete destruction of the city of Carthage.

== Description ==
The Punic Wars is a two-player wargame in which one player controls the Roman forces and the other player controls Carthage. The game includes three scenarios, one for each war. Unusually, there is no time- or turn-limit for any of the scenarios. Instead, each scenario lasts until one player achieves the victory conditions required.

=== Gameplay ===
The game uses a series of alternating turns, first for Carthage, and then for Rome. The series of phases are:

1. Carthage Turn
  1. Diplomacy Phase
  2. Revenue Phase
  3. Movement and Combat Phase
  4. Supply Phase
  5. Recruitment and Fleet Construction Phase
2. Roman Turn
  1. Senate Election Phase
  2. Revenue Phase
  3. Movement and Combat Phase
  4. Supply Phase
  5. Recruitment and Fleet Construction Phase

This completes one Game Turn, which represents one year.

Movement is similar to the system used in Frederick the Great published previously by SPI, where units could not move except when attached to a Leader. Only the Leader has a Movement Allowance, all of the units attached to the Leader move at this rate.

In addition to rules that cover each of the above phases, there are also rules for sieges and attrition, as well as for various rebellions and the shifting alliance of the city of Syracuse, which switched allegiance several times during the Punic Wars.

=== Victory conditions ===
All of the scenarios have identical victory conditions. Achieving any of these conditions brings an immediate end to the game:

- If one player's total Regional Value of controlled Regions reaches the value required on the Victory Table, that player instantly wins.
- If the Carthaginian player is able to place a military unit inside the city of Rome, then Carthage wins.
- If the Roman player is able to place a military unit inside the city of Carthage, then Rome wins.

== Publication history ==
The Punic Wars was designed by Irad B. Hardy, and was published as a free pull-out game in Issue 53 of Strategy & Tactics (November–December 1975). It was also released as a "folio game", packaged in a double LP-sized cardstock folio featuring a painting by 19th-century French artist Henri-Paul Motte on its cover, "Hannibal's army crossing the Rhône" (1878).

The game did not prove popular, failing to crack SPI's Top Ten Bestseller list. In a poll conducted by SPI the following year to determine the most popular board wargames in North America, The Punic Wars placed a dismal 169th out of 202 games.

Following the demise of SPI, Hobby Japan acquired the rights to the game and published a Japanese-language version in Issue 37 of Tactics (December 1986).

== Reception ==
In the 1977 book The Comprehensive Guide to Board Wargaming, Nick Palmer noted that the Punic Wars were "One of history's more important conflicts (Cato used to start every speech with a thunderous 'CARTHAGE MUST BE DESTROYED') but the game balance is dubious, especially the third war."

In The Guide to Simulations/Games for Education and Training, Martin Campion called this game "A sensitive rendition of the strategic problems of the three wars." Campion had issues with diplomacy in the game, saying, "The diplomacy rules in my experience do not seem to work but they are easily replaced or ignored." Campion found the second war to be "the most complicated and most interesting of the scenarios" but noted that the players must make more counters, since not enough had been manufactured for that scenario.

In Issue 1 of the UK wargaming magazine Phoenix, John Norris noted that historically the Roman army was made up of Roman citizens while the Carthaginian army was made up of paid mercenaries, but this detail, and its possible effect, was not included in the game rules. Norris was also irritated that the infantry counters showed Roman soldiers in uniforms from a later period of history, and ship counters showed a ship from the Medieval period. Despite this, Norris concluded, "Such minor complaints aside, this is a commendable attempt to simulate the Punic Wars, and Republican Roman and Carthaginian wargaming generals should find it particularly interesting."

== Other reviews ==
- Fire & Movement #72
- Pursue & Destroy Vol. 3, #2
- Strategy & Tactics #53
