= Dieppe (board game) =

Board wargame published in 1977

Second edition cover art by John Kula

Dieppe, subtitled "An Operational Game of the Allied Raid on Fortress Europe, August 1942", is a board wargame published by Simulations Canada in 1977 that is a simulation of Operation Jubilee, the disastrous Dieppe Raid made by Canadian and British forces during World War II.

== Background ==
On 19 August 1942, a predominantly Canadian amphibious force landed at the German-occupied port of Dieppe as a test of Allied invasion equipment and the ability to take and hold a defended port. With incorrect intelligence, faulty timing and lack of surprise, the raid was a total fiasco in which most of the men never got off the beach, and over half were wounded, killed or taken prisoner.

== Description ==
Dieppe is a two-player wargame in which one player controls the Allied landing forces, and the other player controls the German defenders.

=== Components ===
The game box or ziplock bag contains:

- 21" x 27" paper hex grid map, scaled at 500 m (550 yd) per hex
- rules booklet
- 255 die-cut counters

=== Scenarios ===
The game comes with six scenarios. In all of them, the German units and their placement remain the same, but Allied units differ in number and type.

1. Historical: The day as it actually unfolded, including three uncoordinated landing waves at incorrect landing places, incorrect times of landing and other historically accurate mistakes.
2. The original plan, which envisioned a two-pronged pincer attack to surround the town.
3. The plan envisioned by General Bernard Montgomery: a frontal assault with weak flank attacks and a paratroop drop to take out the artillery batteries.
4. The plan by commander of Combined Operations Louis Mountbatten: He also favoured a pincer attack, but with less air power and more naval units.
5. The historical plan: How it was supposed to happen, with everyone landing where they were supposed to and when they were supposed to.

Some of the objectives vary from scenario to scenario, but all scenarios have six objectives in common:

- Destruction of the aerodrome
- Placing the radar specialist unit in the radar installation for one complete turn
- Capturing the German barge and taking it out to sea.
- Placing the Free French unit in a specific hex.
- Passing a unit through all three hexes of the village of Arque-la-Bataille.
- Destruction of the shore battery

=== Gameplay ===
Every scenario is ten turns in length. Each turn, marking one hour of game time, consists of:

1. Allied Bombardment: The Allied player can use air and artillery markers on hexes to be struck. The total number of bombardment factors placed on a target minus the target's defensive strength indicate which column of the damage chart is used. A die roll results in either units suppressed (lose their turn) or units destroyed.
2. German reinforcements arrive
3. Allied Landing or Withdrawal: Any Allied units arriving at the water's edge (either landing or withdrawing) must stay at the water's edge for the remainder of the turn.
4. German Attack on Landing Units: German units adjacent to the beach may fire at arriving or withdrawing units. If the result is "turned back", a landing unit must attempt to land again the next turn, and a withdrawing unit must wait on the beach for a turn without the opportunity to fire or move.
5. First Allied Movement: All units may move.
6. First Allied Combat: All units within range may fire
7. Second Allied Movement: Allied tanks, commandos and armoured units may move again. Any other Allied units not in a German zone of control may also move again.
8. Second Allied Combat: All Allied units within range may fire.
9. German Bombardment: The three shore batteries fire on the off-map Allied convoy, reducing naval units and Allied victory points.
10. German Phase: The German player moves, fires, moves and fires as the Allied player did in Phases 5–8.

All units have zones of control, forcing opponents to stop. All shore batteries, aerodromes and radar installation have a defensive strength that must be eliminated before Allied units can enter those hexes.

=== Victory points ===
The number of victory points for the Allies varies in inverse proportion to the number of Allied units that start the scenario – the higher the number of units, the fewer the victory points available. The Germans earn victory points for destroying Allied units, and for firing their shore batteries. At the end of the scenario, German victory points are subtracted from Allied victory points. If the result is a positive number, the Allied player wins. If it is a negative number, the German player wins.

== Publication history ==
In the mid-1970s, Simulations Canada was founded by Stephen Newberg with the idea that they would be able to develop a Canadian market for wargames by creating wargames with a Canadian historical angle. After publishing two non-Canadian games — Raketny Kreyser and The Peloponnesian War — Simulations Canada published Dieppe in 1977, a game designed by Stephen Newberg with graphics and artwork by Tom Fennel, and packaged in a ziplock bag. Newberg wrote at the time that two of the scenarios were challenging to the Allied player, and three of the scenarios were challenging to the German player, noting, "the 'challenged' player will have to think and consider and deliberate if he is to obtain his victory requirements because he will be sore pressed."

In 1981, a second edition was published as a boxed set with cover art by John Kula, a new map and upgraded counters, but no revisions to the rules.

Despite positive reviews, the game did not sell well outside of Canada due to the obscurity of the battle to non-Canadian audiences, and did not sell well inside Canada, despite the hopes of its creator. Newberg later commented, "In the beginning we [at Simulations Canada] wanted to do one game in three on a Canadian topic, with the strange notion of building a domestic market. This was before I found out that Canadians do not buy Canadian products due to some inferiority complex problems." Disappointed by the lack of Canadian sales, Simulations Canada did not publish any other Canadian-themed games with the exception of Quebec Libre (1978) and Ortona (1983).

== Reception ==
In Issue 12 of Fire & Movement, Roy Schelper admitted to being prepared for a fairly amateur effort by small Canadian game publisher Simulations Canada, but was pleasantly surprised by the professionalism of the components. He was also impressed by the "tightly written" rules that were "clear and concise" and found the game system to be "elegantly conceived". After playing the game, Schelper noted that "The scenarios are all quite absorbing and tensely balanced, and every one of them offers a chance of victory for either player." Schelper concluded with a strong recommendation, saying, "Dieppe is a fascinating exercise in problem-solving, and covers for the first time, to my knowledge, one of WWII's more obscure topics. {...] WWII buffs will want to add this game to their collections, since it covers a new topic, and all players who like a short, tense game will like Dieppe. [...] Reserve a space on your shelf for Dieppe because it is an outstanding value."

In Issue 65 of Fire & Movement, Jeff Petrasks called the game "fairly complex, but the system is well conceived and well presented. Petraska concluded, "Dieppe succeeds both as a game and as historical simulation, making it an excellent product."

In Issue 35 of Phoenix, John Poole did not like the components, finding the map ugly, and the counters hard to read. But he liked the game sequence, finding that it gave "a clear shape and purpose to the game that accords well with historical reality." Poole had some problems with rules ambiguities, and wished that the game had been designed to give a longer, more complex and more in-depth examination of this battle. He concluded, "In spite of a number of reservations that I have dealt with, I recommend this game. [...] There would surely be scope enough here for a more elaborate, tactical treatment of Jubilee that would, at the same time, preserve the playability and compactness of the original design?"

In Issue 10 of Simulacrum, Luc Olivier commented that, like the actual battle, the game could have suffered from "the unclearness of the real purpose of the operation." But Olivier noted "the designers had the good idea to offer a lot of what-if possibilities among the different battleplans studied before the landing." He concluded, "All in all, a very fine game."
