= Fifth Eskadra (video game) =

1984 strategy video game

- Developer: Simulations Canada
- Publisher: Simulations Canada
- Platforms: Apple II, Commodore 64
- Release: 1984
- Genre: Strategy

Fifth Eskadra is a 1984 video game published by Simulations Canada.

== Gameplay ==
Fifth Eskadra is a game in which a modern naval war is simulated.

== Reception ==
William Highfield reviewed the game for Computer Gaming World, and stated that "The release of FE convinces me that Simulations Canada will be climbing in importance in the computer simulation field."
