= Line of Battle (wargame) =

WWI naval board wargame

Line of Battle, subtitled "Tactical Capital Ship Combat, 1914–1924", is a board wargame published by Simulations Canada in 1986 that simulates naval combat just before, during, and just after World War I.

== Description ==
Line of Battle is a board wargame for two players in which each player controls a number of opposing capital ships.

The game includes a 12-page rulebook and a featureless hex grid map representing 1,000 yards (910 m) of ocean. Four hundred double-sided counters represent every European, American, and Japanese dreadnought of the period.

=== Gameplay ===
Line of Battle uses the same game system developed for sister game Battleship: all movement is pre-plotted and revealed simultaneously. After all ships have moved, combat takes place on a ship-to-ship basis. There are also rules for sighting ranges, torpedo attacks, formations, and secondary armaments.

The game focuses on the dreadnought theory of ship combat: the most favorable position for a ship was to be in an opponent's medium-range zone, while firing at the enemy at either short or long range.

=== Scenarios ===
Ten historical scenarios are included with the game.

== Publication history ==
Game designer Stephen Newberg created several tactical naval combat wargames for Simulations Canada. Two of these, both published in 1986, and both featuring the same set of rules, were Line of Battle, set in World War I, and Battleship, set in World War II. These were the last board wargames published by Simulations Canada for twenty-five years.

In 2006, Omega Games revised this game, republishing it as Line of Battle (Second Edition).

== Reception ==
After being introduced to the game at Origins '86, Ed Coe commented in Issue 51 of Fire & Movement, "The fact that ship design was mostly centered on medium range defense has been somewhat overlooked in tactical naval designs, and is where [game designer] Steve Newberg stakes his claim. Line of Battle could prove to be an interesting study in the Age of the Dreadnought.'"

== Other reviews and commentary ==
- Wargames Illustrated #104
