= Golan Front =

1985 wargame video game

- Publisher: Simulations Canada
- Platforms: Apple II, Commodore 64
- Release: 1985
- Genre: Wargame

Golan Front is a 1985 video game published by Simulations Canada.

== Gameplay ==
Golan Front is a computer wargame in which the battle fought by Israel against Egypt, Syria, Iraq, and Jordan in the Golan Heights is simulated. It features elements of board wargaming, such as counters and a physical map, in addition to computer play.

== Reception ==
William H. Harrington reviewed the game for Computer Gaming World, and stated that "GF is a first rate military simulation." Commodore Microcomputers named it one of the top computer wargames of 1986.
