= Battle of the Atlantic: The Ocean Lifeline =

1984 video game

- Developer: Simulations Canada
- Publisher: Simulations Canada
- Platforms: Apple II, Atari ST
- Release: 1984: Apple II; 1988: Atari ST
- Genre: Wargame

Battle of the Atlantic: The Ocean Lifeline is computer wargame for the Apple II published in 1984 by Simulations Canada. An Atari ST version was released in 1988.

== Gameplay ==
Battle of the Atlantic is a game in which the Battle of the Atlantic is simulated.

== Reception ==
William H. Harrington reviewed the game for Computer Gaming World, and stated that "a sophisticated and highly playable simulation of this decisive World War II naval conflict."
