= The Stalingrad Campaign =

1986 video game

- Publisher: Simulations Canada
- Platforms: Apple II, Atari ST, Commodore 64, MS-DOS
- Release: 1986
- Genre: Computer wargame

The Stalingrad Campaign is a computer wargame published by Simulations Canada in 1986 for Apple II and Commodore 64. Versions for Atari ST and MS-DOS were released in 1987.

== Gameplay ==
The Stalingrad Campaign is a game in which the Southern Front of Russia from June 1942 to February 1943 is featured in a text-only simulation.

== Development ==
Released in 1987, The Stalingrad Campaign was designed by Bill Nichols and published by Simulations Canada.

== Reception ==
M. Evan Brooks reviewed the game for Computer Gaming World, and stated that "Simulations Canada's hybrid of board and computer wargames is an interesting concept. While not part of the mainstream in either sphere, the company has staked out a small niche of dedicated gamers. The basic problem with board and counter assists to the computer is a space consideration. Most computer owners do not have the space next to their computer for easy accessibility."

In Computer Gaming World's 1993 survey of computer wargames, The Stalingrad Campaign received a score of one star out of five. The magazine remarked that The Stalingrad Campaign "fails due to a poor interface, poor documentation, and the inability of the game to deliver any semblance of player participation."
