= Ortona (wargame) =

1983 WWII board wargame

- Designers: Stephen Newberg
- Publishers: Simulations Canada
- Publication: 1983
- Genres: WWII

Ortona, subtitled "A Game of the Advance in Italy, December 1943", is a board wargame published by Simulations Canada in 1983 that simulates the Battle of Ortona during the Italian Campaign of World War II.

== Background ==
Following the invasion of the Italian mainland, the American Fifth Army was given orders to fight their way up Italy to the west of the Appennine mountains, while the British Eighth Army was tasked with forcing their way up the eastern side, through the Germans' well-prepared Winter Line.

The small Adriatic town of Ortona with its deep-water harbour was thought by some to be of strategic importance, and in early December 1943, the 1st Canadian Division, part of the British Eighth Army, was given orders to capture the town. Allied intelligence indicated that the town was lightly held and was likely to be abandoned as soon as the Canadians approached. However, the town was actually held by elements of the battle-hardened German 1st Parachute Division. The Canadians didn't reconnoitre the approaches to the town, and as they approached from the south, they expected to cross what looked like a minor ditch on their maps. But as they advanced, they discovered the "ditch" was actually a deep narrow gully that the Germans had strongly fortified with dug-outs and machine gun nests. After the Canadians' initial advance against the gully failed, Canadian Major General Chris Vokes ordered several frontal assaults, but each attack was repulsed with heavy casualties. After several days a small contingent of Canadians managed to outflank the Gully, forcing the Germans to withdraw to the town.

On 14 December 1943, the Canadians finally entered the streets of Ortona and discovered the Germans had organized a street-by-street defense, with snipers, strong points, mines and booby traps. Fighting in the exposed streets became so deadly that the Canadians took shelter in buildings, and used the technique of mouse-holing to advance, blowing a hole in the adjoining wall of the next building, then using grenades and hand-to-hand fighting to clear the building, before moving on to the next adjoining building. As December dragged on and casualties on both sides mounted, the question became whether either side had enough soldiers and determination left to force the other out of the town.

== Description ==
Ortona is a board wargame for 2 players in which one controls Canadian attackers and the other the German defenders.

The game includes a hex grid map of the town and the Gully scaled at 170 metres (190 yd) per hex, as well as 255 counters and an 8-page rulebook.

As critic Richard Berg noted, the Canadians have the advantage in numbers, but the Germans "have taken excellent advantage of the terrain to give themselves a strong defensive position." The German player must skillfully time withdrawals and counterattacks so as not to be overwhelmed by Canadian assaults.

=== Gameplay ===
The short 8-page rulebook covers artillery fire, command mechanics, German pre-plotting of mines, and the possibility of armoured units breaking down.

== Publication history ==
Stephen Newberg designed Ortona, which was then published by Simulations Canada with a print run of 1000 copies.

== Reception ==
In Issue 98 of Strategy & Tactics, game designer Richard Berg thought this was "a pretty good game." Berg noted a number of issues with the game, including very drab map and counters — "the map is only slightly less colorful than a convention of insurance salesmen; the typeface on the counters will bring joy only to the hearts of those wishing to enter the medical profession and specialize in eyesight." Berg also felt the rules were too short, noting a number of ambiguities. Despite this, Berg felt the game had "a lot of nice touches which provide for a good sense of the battle and the area." Although Berg didn't believe this game would "set heads spinning and registers ringing", he did think it was a "good, solid work, even if marred by a rather slipshod approach to rules writing and a lack of color." Berg concluded, "The situation is fun, though, and both players will be tested to come up with victory."

In Issue 16 of PanzerSchreck, James Meldrum though the game was historically accurate, but noted the lack of "what if?" scenarios that might "highlight various factors that could have altered the outcome of the Battle for Ortona." Meldrum then presented six additional scenarios mainly to do with initial placement of units, and use of various rules such as zone of control.
