= In Harm's Way (video game) =

1988 video game

- Developer(s): Simulations Canada
- Publisher(s): Simulations Canada
- Release: 1988

In Harm's Way is a 1988 video game published by Simulations Canada.

== Gameplay ==
In Harm's Way is a game in which the player can command either the Japanese or American forces to gain control of the World War II Pacific Theater.

== Reception ==
Lt. H. E. Dille reviewed the game for Computer Gaming World, and stated that "In Harm's Way is an excellent simulation of operational level decision-making that also remains faithful to the historical period covered. Those players who demand complete tactical control may be frustrated by this simulation, but for those who are willing to accept that chaos and confusion are a natural part of warfare, this is a "must" to add to a game library."

== Reviews ==
- Fire & Movement #76
