= Kriegsmarine (video game) =

1989 video game

- Cover art by Rodger B. MacGowan
- Developer: Simulations Canada
- Publisher: Simulations Canada
- Platforms: IBM PC, Atari ST, Apple II, Amiga
- Release: 1989

Kriegsmarine is a video game published by Simulations Canada in 1989 that simulates naval combat during World War II. It is text-only, unusual for the time, and requires the player to track ship movement on a physical map.

== Gameplay ==
Kriegsmarine is a game in which a World War II naval simulation is set in the Atlantic theatre of operations. The player is an operational level commander who receives reports and data and then issues commands.

Unlike most videogames of the time that used a graphical display, Kriegsmarine is a text-only game, and the player is required to keep track of ship movements on a map using a grease pencil. Simulations Canada believed that graphics reduced the realism of the game, and that a non-graphical interface was the only way of maintaining the true "fog of war" that an operational commander had to contend with.

== Publication history ==
In 1980, Simulations Canada published a two-person board wargame about World War II naval combat in the North Atlantic titled Kriegsmarine. In 1989, the company released a text-only video game with the same title, although this was a very different game, being a single-player game from an operational rather than a tactical perspective. The game, designed by James Baker and Stephen Newberg, was released for IBM, Atari ST, Apple II, and Amiga computer systems. The video game used the same cover art by Rodger B. MacGowan that had been used on the board game box.

== Reception ==
Lt. H.E. Dille reviewed the game for Computer Gaming World, and stated that "Kriegsmarine is a fine addition to an already successful series of naval wargames by Simulations Canada."

In Issue 5 of ST Format, Paul Rigby warned that "weekend wargamers" would be shocked by the lack of graphics, but thought that "Devoted wargamers, people who want depth and realism, who don't mind working for their enjoyment will find Sim Canb games both enjoyable and unique." However, Rigby thought that the company should have provided more information about algorithms, game variables and historical background used. He also found the "slack time" between action annoying. He concluded, "Presentation may be poor but Sim Can have produced a unique design and an original format allowing the dedicated wargamer to lose himself in the fog of war." He gave the game an above average rating of 8 out of 10 for both strategy and intelligence, but very poor ratings of 2 for presentation and 3 for instant appeal. Overall, he rated the game an average 68%.
