= Grey Seas, Grey Skies =

Canadian 1983 strategy video game

- Publisher: Simulations Canada
- Platforms: Apple II, Atari ST, Commodore 64
- Release: 1983
- Genre: Strategy

Grey Seas, Grey Skies is a strategy video game published by Simulations Canada in 1983.

== Gameplay ==
Grey Seas, Grey Skies is a game in which tactical engagements are simulated between forces composed of surface units and submarine units.

== Reception ==
Jay Selover reviewed Grey Seas, Grey Skies and Fall Gelb for Computer Gaming World, and stated that "Both games are good simulations, and appear to be built on well researched data bases. They are both designed in presentation and content for the board gamer who now has a computer and wants to make use of its limited intelligence and rules adjudication abilities."
