= Rommel at Gazala =

1986 video game

- Publisher(s): Simulations Canada
- Release: 1986
- Genre(s): Strategy

Rommel at Gazala is a 1986 video game published by Simulations Canada.

== Gameplay ==
Rommel at Gazala is a game that simulates the 1942 Battle of Tobruk of World War II.

== Reception ==
Stating that "Simulations Canada is filling a necessary niche in the hobby", Computer Gaming World in 1987 stated that "there is much to learn in this interesting perspective on the desert war". The magazine's Johnny L. Wilson stated that "RAG is a successful utilization of the SimCan design philosophy, but whether it is worth the price is dependent upon whether you buy into that philosophy or not. At least, the specialized requirements of this model fit the SimCan design better than most of their land-based games".

== Reviews ==
- Computer Play
- Warning Order #16
