= Rockets Red Glare (wargame) =

War of 1812 board wargame

The game packaged in a ziplock bag

Rockets Red Glare, subtitled "An Operational and Strategic Study of the War of 1812 in North America", is a board wargame published by Simulations Canada in 1980 that simulates the War of 1812. The game's title is taken from the American national anthem The Star Spangled Banner, written by poet Francis Scott Key after witnessing the bombardment of Fort McHenry by British ships in 1814.

== Description ==
Rockets Red Glare is a two-person wargame in which one player controls British forces and the other controls American forces. The game is a mixture of operational-level and strategic-level, and uses two hex grid maps to achieve this:

- An operational map of the border between the United States and British North America from Detroit to Montreal scaled at 13 mi (21 km) per hex
- A strategic map of the United States from New Orleans to Boston and the surrounding ocean scaled at 85 mi (137 km) per hex. Operations on this map cover both land operations and naval operations, which have separate victory conditions.

=== Operational game ===
The operational game simulates American attempts to invade Upper Canada and Lower Canada, as well as naval combat on the Great Lakes. Movement in this area of rugged and undeveloped boreal forest is slow, and at both the start and end of a player's turn, units that are out of supply are eliminated. This can happen if a unit travels too far from its supply fort, or if the fort that was supplying it is captured. Units can be supplied via naval transport on the Great Lakes, but are subject to being eliminated if their supply ship is captured or destroyed.

=== Strategic game: Oceans ===
American ships attempt to damage the British fleet. Fourteen of the American ships are classified as of superior quality and receive an advantage during combat. Critic Peter Hatton noted that if the American player keeps all of their ships together, an unhistorical strategy in an age of individual ship-to-ship combat, this inevitably leads to an American victory in this phase of the game.

=== Strategic game: Land ===
There are no supply rules for the strategic game. Victory points are for areas occupied, which critic Peter Hatton pointed out is unhistorical — the war along the eastern and south-eastern coast consisted of British amphibious raids, such as the raid that resulted in the Burning of Washington; Hatton believed that by forcing the British to attempt to invade the entire United States, an American victory in this area of the game is guaranteed.

=== Victory conditions ===
Each phase of the game has separate victory conditions:

- In the operational game, possession of key objectives gains victory points
- In the ocean strategic game, victory points are awarded for destroying enemy ships.
- In the land strategic game, victory points are awarded for control of areas.

The winner of the overall game is the player who accumulates the most Victory Points from all three aspects of the game.

== Publication history ==
Stephen Newberg designed Rockets Red Glare, trying to "show the military and logistical reasons for the poor showing on the field by all participants that led to a military status quo and the eventual political results." Simulations Canada published it in 1980 with a print run of 1500 copies packaged in ziplock bags. Although reviews were mixed, Newberg later wrote that the game was "one of the favourites of my own design."

== Reception ==
In Issue 91 of Strategy & Tactics, Eric Goldberg thought that "The design is original in many places and conveys a sense of one of the more senseless wars in history. The Americans begin by harassing the greatly superior British naval forces, and then watch the American heartland get stomped by powerful British stacks." Goldberg did not like the convoluted Victory Point system, feeling that it "detracts from an otherwise likable — if eccentric — game." Goldberg concluded, "If you are vaguely interested in the situation, the text is worth wading through."

In Issue 34 of Fire & Movement, Bob Proctor found the rule book to be too brief, noting, "Rockets Red Glare demands a lot from its rule book ... Unfortunately, [the rulebook's] brevity has left some areas so vague that without errata there is a good chance for misinterpretation." Despite this, Proctor called it "a very successful game in that it fulfills all of the designer's objectives. It combines a nice blend of historical constraints and strategic choices. It portrays the relationship between sea power (and lake power) and land power extremely well." Proctor concluded "Stephen Newberg has done an excellent job. It is an innovative treatment playable in six to eight hours."

Peter Hatton, writing in The Wargamer, found the slow movement and harsh supply rules in the operational game brought the game to a crawl, writing, "So the conflict here, though a faithful simulation of a difficult backwoods sector, is pretty boring." Hatton was also not thrilled with the ocean strategic game, pointing out that it was an easy American win if the American player grouped all their ships together. And Hatton also found the Americans the clear winners of the land strategic game due to the victory conditions of owning inland areas pointing out that "Scattering 25,000 British troops over 216,000 square miles of the Southern U.S.A. is not a strategy of any historic merit." Hatton concluded "the result plays unhistorically on the strategic map and historicity of the operational map lacks excitement ... not a game to recommend."

In a retrospective review in Issue 10 of Simulacrum, Steve Carey called Rockets Red Glare "one of SimCan's icon games, an ambitious design on an unheralded topic. [Designer Stephen] Newberg stated that he really enjoyed working on the project, and it shows. The interweaving of the various scales and units, both land and naval, provides for a different gaming experience.

== Reviews ==
- Perfidious Albion #71 (p5-7)
