= D.A.K. =

WWII board wargame

D.A.K. (German acronym for Deutches Afrikakorps, the German expeditionary force sent to Africa during World War II) is a board wargame published by Simulations Canada in 1982 that simulates the North African Campaign.

== Background ==
The German High Command sent the Deutches Afrikakorps to Africa in early 1941 to shore up Italian forces, which had not fared well against British forces. The German forces immediately proved they were the equals of the British, setting off a two-year campaign to determine primacy in North Africa.

== Description ==
D.A.K. is a two-person wargame in which one player controls Allied forces and the other controls Axis forces.

The hex grid map is designed to be cut lengthwise, and both pieces laid end to end to represent North Africa from Damascus to Casablanca.

=== Supply ===
D.A.K. is designed as a game of supply in the form of "Ops Points", which are needed to move, to fight, and even to remain stationary. The game designer, Stephen Newberg, wrote, "[The North African Campaign] has often been called the Quartermaster's War, and this is not far from wrong. With D.A.K., I wanted to show this aspect with all its limitations while still maintaining a viewpoint for the players as overall theatre commanders."

Each player receives several hundred Ops Points each turn, but these arrive in friendly ports and have to be moved inland to the units needing them, paying a cost per hex in points that varies according to terrain.

Players can create supply dumps close to the front so that supply can be more easily and quickly moved to units.

== Publication history ==
Stephen Newberg designed D.A.K. as an exercise in supply control, and Simulations Canada published it in 1982 with a print run of 1000 copies featuring cover art by Newberg and John Kula.

The following year Simulations Canada published another Newberg game, La Regia Marina, a game about the war in the Mediterranean, which contains rules so that it can be mated to D.A.K. to make a combined game about the entire Mediterranean-North African campaign.

== Reception ==
In Issue 38 of Fire & Movement, Jay Selover found the supply bookkeeping overwhelming, writing, "Every North Africa game requires logistics constraints, but the bookkeeping really cuts into D.A.K. The key to understanding and playing D.A.K. is 'Ops Points'. You have to plan pretty much what you want to do in a turn right from the beginning." Selover concluded, "The supply system does accurately portray the limitations under which theater commanders operated. D.A.K. has a few bright spots, but struggles in an attempt to simulate strategically what was mainly an operational theater."

In a retrospective review in Issue 10 of Simulacrum, Steve Carey called D.A.K. a game that stood out from the many games about action in North Africa, commenting, "Amidst a plethora of other North Africa games, D.A.K. actually generated a fair amount of interest for me. Yes, one will need a calculator, as there is a lot of number tracking here." Carey concluded, "Intended to link up with the La Regia Marina naval design, this still is a decent looking stand-alone item, though it does appear that it would really shine when mated up with L.R.M."
