= The Peloponnesian War (wargame) =

Board wargame

Cover of 1st edition (ziplock bag), 1977

The Peloponnesian War is a board wargame published by Simulations Canada (SimCan) in 1977 that simulates the 5th century BCE war between the Greek cities of Athens and Sparta.

== Background ==
Friction between Athens and the Peloponnesian states, especially Sparta, flared into war in 431 BCE, and did not end until 404 BCE.

== Description ==
The Peloponnesian War is a two-player board wargame where one player controls the forces of Athens, and the other the Spartan forces. Although the game has a 22" x 28" hex grid map, only 270 counters, and rules characterized as "simplistic", it is a long game, estimated at 8 or more hours. Much of the strategy concerns logistics, including troop mobilization and funding. Troop supply also must be maintained by controlling cities and naval supply lanes. Each turn in the game represents one year, and the game ends after 27 turns. There are also rules for a three-player game, where the third player controls the Peloponnesian states other than Sparta.

Cover of 2nd edition (boxed set), 1982

== Publication history ==
In the mid-1970s, Stephen Newberg was working on his Master's thesis in ancient history while in the Canadian Armed Forces. He designed The Peloponnesian War as an outgrowth of his scholarly work, later commenting, "Athens and Sparta, at first glance, display the classic confrontation between a democracy and a dictatorship, a seapower and a land power. An ideal, and often-touted direct analogy to the modern standoff between the United States and Soviet Russia during the Cold War."

Newberg founded Simulations Canada in 1977 to publish The Peloponnesian War as a ziplock bag game. Five years later, a second edition with new counters and revised rules was published as a boxed set.

== Reception ==
In Issue 10 of Fire & Movement, Bill Haggart commented "[Game designer] Newberg knows the history of the Greek Wars and has done some interesting things simulating it." However Haggart found both pros and cons to the game, saying, "I found PW to be interesting, colorful (in the historic sense as well), long and exhausting."

Game designer Richard Berg found the game to be of "Moderate complexity, fairly long."

In the 1980 book The Complete Book of Wargames, game designer Jon Freeman did not like the 1st edition components, finding the counters "garish, and hard to read" and commenting that the map colors "could induce nausea in a veteran nurse." He also had issues with the rules, calling the many typographical errors "careless design work — hardly a recommendation for a fun evening." He concluded by giving the game an Overall Evaluation of only "Fair", saying, "The game's designer does have, in general terms, a vague handle on the feel of the war, but the subject deserves better."

In Issue 10 of Simulacrum, Steve Carey noted that "The 2nd edition corrects some of the flaws from the 1st edition -- gone are the gaudy, hard to read counters, the rules are more streamlined, and certain odd situations are rectified."

== Other reviews and commentary ==
- The Wargamer Vol.1 #29
- Paper Wars #107
- Slingshot #83
- Perfidious Albion #39 (May 1979) p.9
