= Battleplan (magazine) =

Issue 4

Battleplan was a bimonthly magazine which was headquartered in Long Beach, California. It was devoted to providing variants, scenarios, and articles on game strategy for wargaming products by a variety of publishers. The first issue appeared in March/April 1987, with the last issue, Number 9, appearing in 1989. The first six issues had been published by Diverse Talents, Inc. (DTI also published Fire & Movement and Space Gamer at that time) until DTI was bought out by World Wide Wargamers (3W), who continued to publish the magazine for three more issues. In 1989 Battleplan was merged with Wargamer.

The magazine had low production values, being printed on low-grade newsprint rather than high-quality paper like its sister magazines of the day.
