= Pacific Storm: The Midway Campaign =

1992 video game

- Developer(s): R.C. Crandall
- Publisher(s): Simulations Canada
- Release: 1992
- Genre(s): Wargame

Pacific Storm: The Midway Campaign is a 1992 video game published by Simulations Canada and designed by R.C. Crandall.

== Gameplay ==
Pacific Storm: The Midway Campaign is a game in which up to two players engage in a strategic-level wargame beginning on May 15, 1942, playing through nine two-week turns, and players can either play as Admiral Yamamoto or Admiral Nimitz. It is a text only game, the second release in the line after Pacific Storm - The Solomons.

== Reception ==
Alan Emrich reviewed the game for Computer Gaming World, and stated that "While it has always seemed that [the price] is a lot to pay for a computer wargame with no graphics or sound support, it is nonetheless impressive to find a wargame that, at its highest level of play, can be finished in under 15 minutes. [...] The 'Storm' series from SimCan is one of their best".

The PC Games Bible called Simulations Canada "the masters of tactical computer moderated games", noting that their products are "very specialist, effectively a computer moderated board game, no graphics, text driven, and complex."
