= Simulations Canada =

Canadian wargame publisher

Simulations Canada, Ltd.
- Industry: Gaming
- Founded: 1977
- Headquarters: British Columbia, Canada (formerly Bridgewater, Nova Scotia)
- Key people: Stephen Newberg
- Products: Board games, wargames

Simulations Canada is a Canadian board wargame publisher established in Nova Scotia in 1977, before moving to Vancouver Island, British Columbia. The company was founded by Stephen Newberg as a one-man operation and was one of only a handful of companies devoted to publishing wargames at that time. Other companies such as Avalon Hill and Simulations Publications, Inc. did not accept unsolicited submissions, resulting in the creation of the company.

As the wargames industry grew, Simulations Canada made a number of text-only computer wargames that included a traditional board-game map and counters. The company decided to focus entirely on computer games by 1986. In 2001, Simulations Canada entered into a partnership with Matrix Games to publish some of Simulations Canada's computer titles, resulting in the release of Flashpoint Germany in 2005. In 2004, another partnership with Omega Games saw the rerelease of Line of Battle and Battleship.

== Board games ==
Year	Title	Designer(s)	Era	Notes
1977	Raketny Kreyser		Cold War	Simulates a tactical naval engagement with surface ships and aircraft
1977	The Peloponnesian War		Ancient	Strategic-level simulation
1977	Dieppe		World War II	
1978	Quebec Libre		Modern	Political and economic simulation of Canada under political tension
1978	IJN		World War II	
1978	Le Grand Empire		Napoleonic Wars	
1979	Warring States		Warring States period in ancient China	
1979	Torpedo!		World War II	Simulates tactical submarine and anti-submarine warfare
1979	I Will Fight No More... Forever		Nez Perce War	A game on the Nez Perce campaign of 1877
1980	Lee at the Crossroads		American Civil War	Brigade-level study of the Battle of Gettysburg
1980	Kriegsmarine		World War II	
1980	Dark Stars		Space	Simulations Canada's only science-fiction game
1980	Assault on Tobruk		World War II	
1980	Rockets Red Glare		War of 1812	Strategic and operational simulation of the War of 1812 in North America
1981	Jihad!		Early Muslim conquests	Strategic simulation of the first century of Islamic expansion after the death of Mohammed
1981	Inchon		Korean War	Simulation of the Inchon campaign
1981	Divine Wind		World War II	Strategic simulation of the Pacific War
1982	Seapower & the State	Stephen Newberg	Cold War	Simulates a global naval war between the U.S. and USSR. Was remade as a PC game under the title Red Sky at Morning
1982	Scourge of God		Middle Ages	Covers the Mongol wars 1206-1259
1982	Napoleon's Last Triumph	William Haggart, Stephen Newberg	Napoleonic Wars	A grand tactical game of the Battle of Wagram
1982	D.A.K.		World War II	Strategic simulation covering the battle for North Africa
1983	With Fire and Sword	P. L. Hollinger, Stephen Newberg	Thirty Years' War	Strategic simulation covering the entire Thirty Years' War
1983	The Wilderness		American Civil War	Brigade-level study of the Battle of the Wilderness
1983	La Regia Marina		World War II	Strategic simulation of naval combat in the Mediterranean Sea
1983	Ortona		World War II	Operational simulation covering the Allied drive on Ortona in December 1943
1983	Man of War		Age of Sail	Tactical-level study of naval battles from 1775 to 1815
1983	Hannibal: The Italian Campaign	P. L. Hollinger	Second Punic War	Strategic simulation of Hannibal's campaign in Italy
1984	Schnellboote		World War II	Focuses on small-craft warfare
1984	Power and Resolution		English Civil War	
1984	The One World	P. L. Hollinger, Stephen Newberg	Aztec wars	
1984	Lebensraum!		World War II	Grand-strategic game of the Eastern Front. Republished by Compass Games in 2018
1984	Battle Stations		Cold War	Operational game of modern naval combat
1985	West Front		World War II	Grand-strategic game of the Western Front. Republished by Compass Games in 2018
1985	Norseman		Medieval	
1986	Line of Battle		World War I	Tactical study of naval combat from 1912 to 1924. Republished in a second edition by Omega Games in 2006
1986	Battleship		World War II	Tactical study of naval combat from 1924 to 1945. Republished in a second edition by Omega Games in 2005
2010	Grand Fleet		World War I	Strategic game of the Anglo-German naval struggle for control of the North Sea
2015	Setting Sun, Rising Sun		Russo-Japanese War	Strategic game of the Russo-Japanese War's naval actions
2017	Sovereign of the Seas		Age of Sail	Strategic game of naval struggle between the UK and European powers from 1756 to 1805
2019	Once We Moved Like the Wind		Apache Wars	
2020	Dawn of Empire		Spanish-American War	Strategic game of the Spanish-American War's naval actions

== Computer games ==
Year	Title	Designer(s)	Era	Notes	Platform
1983	Fall Gelb	Les Howie	World War II	Strategic-level game covering the Battle of France	Apple II, Atari ST, C64, PC
1983	Grey Seas, Grey Skies	Bill Nichols, Stephen Newberg, Thomas Konczal (2nd edition)	Cold War	Portrays small naval engagements. A second edition was released in 1987, with more playable vessels and additional features	Apple II, C64, PC
1984	Sieg in Afrika	John Kula	World War II	Strategic-level game of the North African Campaign from 1940 to 1943 covered in monthly turns	Apple II, C64
1984	Fifth Eskadra	Bill Nichols, Stephen Newberg	Cold War	Theater-level game of a U.S.-Soviet naval campaign in the Mediterranean Sea	Apple II, C64, PC
1985	Battle of the Atlantic	Les Howie, Stephen Newberg	World War II	Strategic-level game covering Atlantic convoy activities from 1939 to 1944	Apple II, Atari ST, PC
1985	Golan Front	Bill Nichols, Stephen Newberg	Yom Kippur War	Theater-level game of the Yom Kippur War's Syrian-Israeli front	Apple II, C64, pC
1985	Seventh Fleet	Bill Nichols, Stephen Newberg	Cold War	Theater-level game of a U.S.-Soviet naval campaign in the Western Pacific Ocean	Apple II, C64, PC
1986	Rommel at Gazala	Stephen St. John	World War II		Apple II, Atari ST, PC
1986	Operation Overlord	Stephen St. John	World War II		Apple II, Atari ST, PC
1986	To the Rhine	Stephen St. John, Stephen Newberg	World War II		Apple II, Atari ST, PC
1987	Moscow Campaign	Stephen St. John, Stephen Newberg	World War II		Apple II, PC
1987	The Stalingrad Campaign	Bill Nichols	World War II		Apple II, Atari ST, C64, PC
1987	Kursk Campaign	Stephen St. John, Stephen Newberg	World War II		Apple II, PC
1987	Long Lance	Bill Nichols	World War II	Covers naval combat in the Pacific in 1942	Apple II, Amiga, Atari ST, C64, PC
1988	In Harm's Way	Bill Nichols	World War II	Covers naval combat in the Pacific from 1943 to 1944	Apple II, Amiga, Atari ST, C64, PC
1988	Rommel at El Alamein	Stephen St. John, Stephen Newberg	World War II		Apple II, Atari ST, PC
1988	Northern Fleet	Bill Nichols, James Baker, Stephen Newberg	Cold War	Theater-level game of a NATO-Soviet naval campaign on the North Atlantic	Apple II, Atari ST, PC
1989	Grand Fleet	James Baker, Stephen Newberg	World War I	Covers naval combat from 1906 to 1920 in the North Sea	Atari ST, PC
1989	Kriegsmarine	James Baker, Stephen Newberg	World War II	Covers naval combat in the Atlantic from 1939 to 1945	Amiga, Atari ST, PC
1989	Main Battle Tank: Central Germany	Stephen Newberg, Stephen St. John	Cold War	Battalion/brigade-level game of mechanized combat in West Germany	Apple II, Atari ST, PC
1990	Battle Tank: Barbarossa to Stalingrad	Stephen Newberg, Stephen St. John	World War II		Amiga, Atari ST, PC
1990	Main Battle Tank: North Germany	Stephen Newberg, Stephen St. John	Cold War	Follow-up to Central Germany but set in NATO's Northern Army Group sector	Apple II, Atari ST, PC
1990	Malta Storm	Robert Crandall, Stephen Newberg	World War II	Strategic-level game covering the Siege of Malta and Axis attempts to resupply forces in North Africa	Amiga, Atari ST, PC
1990	Fleet Med	James Baker, Stephen Newberg	World War II	Covers naval combat in the Mediterranean Sea from 1939 to 1943	Amiga, Atari ST, PC
1991	Main Battle Tank: Middle East	Stephen Newberg, Stephen St. John	Modern warfare	Covers potential conflicts in the Middle East	Amiga, Atari ST, PC
1991	Battle Tank: Kursk to Berlin	Stephen Newberg, Stephen St. John	World War II		Apple II, Atari ST, PC
1991	Pacific Storm: The Midway Campaign	Robert Crandall	World War II	Strategic-level game covering an 18-week period beginning on May 15, 1942 in 9 two-week turns	PC
1991	Pacific Storm: The Solomons Campaign	Robert Crandall	World War II		PC
1993	Red Sky at Morning	Bill Nichols, James Baker, Stephen Newberg	Cold War	Based upon Seapower & the State; covers naval warfare across the world in a World War III scenario, with start dates in 1973, 1982, 1991, and 2000	PC
1993	Man of War	Stephen Newberg, Stephen St. John	Age of Sail		PC
