= Fall Gelb: The Fall of France =

1983 wargame video game

- Publisher: Simulations Canada
- Platforms: Apple II, Atari ST
- Release: 1983
- Genre: Wargame

Fall Gelb: The Fall of France is a 1983 video game published by Simulations Canada.

== Gameplay ==
Fall Gelb is a game in which Germany invades the Netherlands, Belgium, and France during World War II.

== Reception ==
Jay Selover reviewed Grey Seas, Grey Skies and Fall Gelb for Computer Gaming World, and stated that "Both games are good simulations, and appear to be built on well researched data bases. They are both designed in presentation and content for the board gamer who now has a computer and wants to make use of its limited intelligence and rules adjudication abilities."
