= The One World =

1984 Aztec board wargame

Cover art by John Kula

The One World, subtitled "A Strategic Game of the Aztecs, 1426–1501", is a board wargame published by the wargame publisher Simulations Canada in 1984 that simulates a civil war in the Mexican Basin during the Aztec Empire.

== Description ==
The One World is a board wargame for 4–6 players in which players control different nations of the Aztec Empire — the Tepanscanpan, Acolhuacan, Tlahuican, Chalco, Tlateputzco and Mexica — and try to achieve domination via religion, politics and war.

The game includes a hex grid map of the Mexican Basin in 1426, as well as 255 counters and an 8-page rulebook.

=== Gameplay ===
The focus of the game is to take over cities, which will increase a nation's strength. Like Diplomacy, the object of the game is to drive other players out of the game until there is only one player left.

Each faction is led by a leader, who can be replaced if assassinated or dies from old age or from combat injury. New units can be recruited from cities controlled by the player.

Each turn features a Flower war segment, an ancient Aztec ritual in which a player is assigned a random opponent for combat. Several critics noted that this seemingly serves no purpose, since it has little or no effect on the game.

Victory points are awarded at the end of each turn, and the player with the most points at the end of the game is the winner; theoretically, a player who has been eliminated could still win the game, although critic Rick Heli calls this result "unlikely."

== Publication history ==
Peter Hollinger started to design The One World, but only partly finished it, and Stephen Newberg finished creating the game. It was published in 1984 by Simulations Canada with cover art by John Kula and a print run of 1000 copies. It did not receive critical acclaim and failed to find an audience.

Newberg later wrote, "'All of the elements are there, but they did not seem to gel as completely as I would have liked. In the end, it is a pretty good Beer & Pretzels game with the external gloss of the Aztec world before Spain arrived on the scene, but not a lot more than that."

== Reception ==
In Issue 97 of Strategy & Tactics, game designer Richard Berg was not impressed, writing, "I constantly marvel at the willingness of Steve Newberg and his SimCan company to tackle subjects that no one wants to go near. I think that is, unequivocally, marvelous ... I also constantly marvel at the ability of SimCan to take interesting subjects such as these and make absolutely nothing out of them. In a way, they are alchemists: they turn intrigue into ennui and fascination into fatuousness." Berg concluded, "The One World is a stultifying snore with practically no interest to any but the most naive gamer, and the game has even less insight into its subject."

Writing for Spotlight on Games, Rick Heli didn't think there was an audience for the game, writing, "there are players who like diplomatic games and there are players who like complex simulations, but the number who really enjoy games like this one which strongly emphasize both are rather rare. For the pure diplomatic type of player, there is too much complexity and game length for it to be enjoyable where as for the simulation player, the game is too much bound up in diplomacy to be enjoyable when what they really want to do is win by virtue of having the best strategy and tactics."

In a retrospective review in Issue 10 of Simulacrum, Brian Train wrote, "This is indeed an odd game, and is still the only design on the subject. I wanted to like it, but the graphic unimpressiveness of the components and map (and for SimCan, that's saying something) and the blandness of what players get to do during the game make it difficult."
