= Tobruk (board game) =

Board wargame that simulates tank combat

Tobruk, subtitled "Tank Battles in North Africa 1942", is a board wargame published by Avalon Hill in 1975 that simulates tank combat in North Africa during World War II.

== Background ==
In 1942, German and Italian forces under the command of Erwin Rommel clashed with British forces at the Battle of Gazala and Battle of Bir Hakeim near the city of Tobruk and succeeded in driving the British forces back.

== Description ==
Tobruk is a two-player game in which one player controls German and Italian forces and the other player controls British and Allied forces. Although tank combat is paramount, infantry, artillery, and air superiority aspects of combat are present, albeit in secondary, reduced or abstract form.

=== Components ===
The game box includes:

- 3 hex grid maps (can be combined or used separately, depending on the scenario), scaled at 63 m (69 yd) per hex
- 36-page Rulebook
- 504 die-cut counters
- various charts and player aids
- pad of Infantry and Crew Roster sheets
- two six-sided dice

=== Graduated scenarios ===
The game includes nine scenarios. The rules are introduced gradually in order to teach new players a basic set of rules with the first scenario, with new rules and complexity added to each successive scenario.

=== Gameplay ===
Each turn represents thirty seconds of real time, and each counter represents a single vehicle or a platoon of soldiers. The game board is a featureless desert terrain, the only defenses being man-made, such as slit trenches, bunkers, wire entanglements and tank revetments. Each round of fire requires dice rolls to resolve a successful hit, location of the hit and the damage caused. The game system uses SPI's Simultaneous-Sequential-Play-System, a more realistic system than the traditional wargame "I Go, You Go" sequential turn system.

== Publication history ==
Tobruk was designed by freelance game designer Harold Hock and was developed by Avalon Hill staffer Randall Reed, who also provided the artwork. A 1st edition was only sold at the 1975 Origins Game Fair, with a few units also sold via mail-order. Several errors in the rules were discovered, and a 2nd edition with revised rulebook and charts was quickly released later in the same year. The game received little support or publicity from Avalon Hill and did not sell well. In 1987, Avalon Hill sold the rights back to Hock.

In 2002, Critical Hit Inc. extensively revised and expanded the game and released the result as Advanced Tobruk. The game proved popular, and Critical Hit produced several expansion modules.

== Reception ==
In the inaugural issue of Perfidious Albion, Charles Vasey and Geoff Barnard traded comments about the game. Barnard noted, "The game is complicated, and can be very long winded in terms of the amount of player work that must be expended to determine quite minor points ... Notwithstanding this, the game is certainly very realistic." Vasey replied, "I found it an interesting game, and one that I was at least pleased to attempt, but I would view it much along the lines of being rich. Nice if someone hands it to you on a plate, but far too much work otherwise."

In Issue 54 of Games & Puzzles (November 1976), Nick Palmer called Tobruk "one of the most innovative wargames for years. It positively bubbles with new ideas and old ideas taken in a new context. Whether all the ideas are good ones is another matter." He noted the graduate learning approach, but warned that "it requires patience to be prepared to play eight games before reaching the full flower of Tobruk, and the early scenarios are not terribly interesting except as learning devices." Palmer found two major issues with the game: the lack of excitement around gradual attrition of units leading to surrender; and "the extraordinary number of die-rolls required." He concluded by giving the game an Excitement rating of only 2 out of 5, saying the game "is less suitable for newcomers [and is] unlikely to appeal greatly to players who demand instant action every turn." The following year, in his book The Comprehensive Guide to Board Wargaming, Palmer confessed that he did not like the graduated system of rules, commenting that "Early scenarios are very simple indeed and not very interesting." He noted that "the most controversial feature is the legions of die rolls required, as each round of fire is checked in exhaustive detail." Palmer concluded that the game was "Impressively detailed, with strong flavour of realism, but some miss the blood and thunder of faster moving games." In his 1980 sequel, The Best of Board Wargaming, Palmer added a further comment about the "interminable die-rolls ", saying, "This aspect of the game is its greatest weakness [...] Tedium can set in rapidly." He concluded by giving the game a very low "excitement" grade of only 20%.

Andrew Marshall, writing for Boot Camp & Military Fitness Institute, noted that despite the use of SPI's new Simultaneous-Sequential-Play-System (SSPS) that allowed for much greater realism without sacrificing playability, Tobruk did not sell well due to the detailed artillery penetration tables, which ironically undercut the new SSPS game system by increasing realism at the cost of playability. Marshall commented that the system "inundates players with tables of complex ballistics information."

In The Guide to Simulations/Games for Education and Training, Martin Campion commented on the possible use of this game as an educational aid, saying, "Tobruk is fascinating, and except for the lack of terrain, fairly accurate. It is a great deal of work, however, for the amount of warfare simulated and probably too difficult for most classrooms."

John Keefer, writing for The Escapist Magazine in 2014, listed eight old Avalon Hill games that he felt deserved to be reprinted. One of the games was Tobruk, which he recalled was "a very tactical game given the openness of the terrain, and it was also very specific with a limited set of scenarios."

== Awards ==
At the 1976 Origins Awards, Tobruk was a finalist for a Charles S. Roberts Award in the category "Best Professional Game of 1975."

== Other recognition ==
A copy of Tobruk is held in the collection of the Strong National Museum of Play (object 117.956).

== Other reviews and commentary ==
- Campaign #90
- Fire & Movement #60
- PanzerFaust #54 & #70
