= Battle of Tobruk =

Battle of Tobruk may refer to:

- Battle of Tobruk (1911), an engagement in December 1911 during the Italo-Turkish War
- British capture of Tobruk, the capture of Tobruk by the Allies in January 1941
- Siege of Tobruk, by the Axis from April to November 1941
- Axis capture of Tobruk, the fall of Tobruk to the Axis in June 1942
- 1989 air battle near Tobruk, shootdown of two Libyan MIG-23s
