= Man of War (video game) =

1997 video game

- Developer(s): Strategy First
- Publisher(s): Virgin Interactive Entertainment
- Platform(s): MS-DOS, Windows
- Release: 1997

Man of War is a 1997 real-time strategic naval combat video game developed by Strategy First and published by Virgin Interactive Entertainment for MS-DOS compatible operating systems and Microsoft Windows. A sequel, Man of War II: Chains of Command, was released in 1999.

== Plot and gameplay ==
Players complete naval battles through a series of historical scenarios. The games included a character creator, and a scenario editor.

"It was a turn-based game wherein you plotted your orders on a 2D map, then watched your turn play out in real-time 3D from the deck of a ship; while you could move about the ship and watch the action from different perspectives, you had no control during this real-time phase—you were only an observer."

— Scott Udell, CDMag

== Development ==
The game was developed by the small studio Strategy First (established in 1991), and would become one of its flagship series. Man of War was released December 31, 1997, while the sequel was released December 31, 1999. On June 17, 1997, Virgin Interactive signed a distribution agreement with Strategy First for North and South America; as part of the deal Virgin Interactive would also distribute two additional titles from Strategy First.

== Reception ==
CD Mag felt the game took players to places they had never been before, though described it as a "pretty straightforward classic wargame with a new-fangled wrapper". Game Revolution said that while the game sounds good on paper it falls flat in its execution. The game sold 30,000 copies by April 1999.

== Legacy ==
Man of War II was released in North America in 1999 by GT Interactive.
