= Seventh Fleet (video game) =

1985 video game

- Publisher(s): Simulations Canada
- Platform(s): Apple II, Commodore 64
- Release: 1985
- Genre(s): Wargame

Seventh Fleet is a 1985 computer wargame published by Simulations Canada.

== Gameplay ==
Seventh Fleet is a computer wargame that simulates the invasion of Vietnam by China. It features elements of board wargaming, such as counters and a physical map, combined with computer play.

== Publication history ==
Seventh Fleet was released by Simulations Canada for the Commodore 64, Apple II, Atari ST and IBM PC.

== Reception ==
Reception

Review score
Publication	Score
Computer Play	7.36/10

Ed Curtis reviewed the game for Computer Gaming World, and stated that "SF is the best simulation of operational level naval warfare currently available. My only doubt concerns its longevity."

In a 1989 survey of computer wargames, J. L. Miller of Computer Play offered Seventh Fleet a positive assessment, noting that it offered "minimal graphics but good play value".
