= Northern Fleet (video game) =

1988 video game

- Publisher(s): Simulations Canada
- Platform(s): Apple II, Atari ST, Commodore 64, MS-DOS, Mac
- Release: 1988

Northern Fleet is a 1988 video game published by Simulations Canada.

== Gameplay ==
Northern Fleet is a game in which operations for the American or Soviet naval forces in the North Atlantic are simulated.

== Reception ==
M. Evan Brooks reviewed the game for Computer Gaming World, and stated that "In Northern Fleet, much of what is happening is hidden behind the immutable source code of the computer. Nevertheless, it is a clear success as it presents the "appearance" of historical accuracy."
