= Main Battle Tank: Central Germany =

1989 video game

- Developer: Simulations Canada
- Publisher: Simulations Canada
- Platforms: Amiga, Apple II
- Release: 1989

Main Battle Tank: Central Germany is a video game published in 1986 by Simulations Canada.

== Gameplay ==
Main Battle Tank: Central Germany is a game in which the player takes the role of either a battalion leader or a brigade/regiment leader in a scenario covered by the fog of war.

== Reception ==
Mike Siggins reviewed Main Battle Tank: West Germany for Games International magazine, and gave it 4 stars out of 5, and stated that "MBT is a very good game and should be an essential purchase for the modern period gamer."

William Bulley reviewed the game for Computer Gaming World, and stated that "Main Battle Tank: Central Germany is a quality game."
