= Rodger B. MacGowan =

American artist

- Avalon Hill's bestseller Squad Leader. Cover art by Rodger B. MacGowan, 1977
- Born: 1948; San Francisco
- Died: February 21, 2025
- Occupations: Artist, publisher, graphic designer, game designer

Rodger B. MacGowan (1948 - February 21, 2025) was an artist, game developer, art director, and magazine publisher who was active in the board wargame industry from the 1970s. MacGowan was a prolific artist of cover art for wargames, and the wargaming magazine he founded, Fire & Movement, won the Charles S. Roberts Award several times while under his editorial control. MacGowan co-founded GMT Games, and created C3i magazine, for which he was Editor-In-Chief and art director.

== Biography ==
=== Early life ===
Rodger MacGowan was born in San Francisco in 1948, the son of career Marine Donald L. MacGowan, and grew up on various Marine bases in Hawaii, North Carolina, New Jersey, and California. Rodger was a budding artist from a young age and using his personal observations of military life, he began creating military history illustrations in the seventh grade. While attending Oceanside High School in California, he was introduced to Avalon Hill's Gettysburg by a friend, and his parents purchased a copy for him while vacationing at the Gettysburg battlefield. Hooked on the board wargaming hobby, MacGowan started reading books about military history, and received Avalon Hill games Stalingrad and Afrika Korps as birthday gifts. He dropped his wargame hobby after entering UCLA to study art, motion pictures, and graphic design.

MacGowan restarted his gaming hobby again after playing Avalon Hill's Panzer Blitz. MacGowan kept in touch with his high school gaming friends, corresponding with them about the games he was playing and describing the games in "Battle Reports" which included maps and analyses. These proved to be so popular with his friends that he expanded his concept to create an amateur magazine, Arquebus.

Following graduation, he found work at an advertising agency, where he was serendipitously given the opportunity to create cover art for one of the agency's accounts, a science fiction magazine titled Vertex. Although the magazine only lasted sixteen issues (1973–1975), MacGowan contributed one cover and over a dozen interior illustrations for various science fiction stories.

MacGowan moved to Los Angeles to become a television graphic artist.

Cover of Fire & Movement #1

=== Professional career ===
In 1975, there was no professionally-published independent review magazine for wargames – the largest, Strategy & Tactics, was owned by the games company Simulations Publications Inc., and its rival The General, was owned by games company Avalon Hill. MacGowan saw a niche market for an independent wargames magazine and approached Baron Publishing Company, who expressed interest in printing it as long as MacGowan paid all printing costs after the first issue. MacGowan created the company RBM Design Studio, borrowed money from friends, and published the first issue of his new bi-monthly magazine Fire & Movement in May 1976. The first issue was 48 pages, and had a circulation of 2000. By the end of 1976, F&M's circulation matched that of Moves (owned by game company SPI), and was nominated for a Charles S. Roberts Award for "Best Professional Magazine". In 1978, F&M won the "Best Professional Magazine" award, and repeated this for the next five years.

In 1977, Avalon Hill approached RBM to produce cover art for their wargames. MacGowan's first cover was for The Russian Campaign, which became the first American wargame to portray Soviet soldiers on its cover. In 1977, MacGowan created the cover art for Avalon Hill's bestselling wargame Squad Leader. For subsequent expansion sets and related games, Avalon Hill's plan had been to only portray German soldiers, but MacGowan insisted on using a different nationality on each box cover. MacGowan continued breaking new ground, being the first to portray Japanese pilots and crews on a wargame box for 1979's Flat Top by Avalon Hill, and the first to portray Egyptian soldiers on 1981's Suez '73 by GDW.

MacGowan quickly made a reputation for wargame cover art. Game critic Kevin Pollock, reviewing Beachhead by Yaquinto Publications in 1980, opined that "the cover painting by Rodger B. MacGowan is excellent. I think Roger is far and away the best illustrator in the industry and I'm sure all the Squad Leader devotees out there will back up that statement."

In 1982, F&M was sold to Steve Jackson Games. In 1990, MacGowan co-founded GMT Games, and two years later created C3i Magazine, in MacGowan's words to readers, to "inform, entertain, add to your perspective and instruct you in your enjoyment of GMT games." For many years, MacGowan was a graphic design consultant with Computer Gaming World.

=== Personal ===
MacGowan enjoyed music, especially movie scores by Jerry Goldsmith, for inspiration while painting. He was married and lived in Santa Monica, California. He died on February 21, 2025 of pneumonia.

== Partial list of box cover art by company ==
MacGowan is a prolific artist, having created over 275 pieces of box cover art for over twenty different wargame companies. A partial list includes:

- 3W: 34 covers
- Australian Design Group: 2 covers
- Avalon Hill: 24 game covers including Squad Leader, Cross of Iron, Advanced Squad Leader
- Game Designers' Workshop: 17 covers including White Death
- GMT Games: 137 covers including Air Bridge to Victory
- Hobby Japan: 25 covers including Ironbottom Sound
- Operational Studies Group: 4 covers including Napoleon at Bay
- Peoples War Games: 4 covers
- Quarterdeck Games: 4 covers
- Simulations Canada: 11 covers including Kriegsmarine, Dieppe
- Yaquinto Publications: 11 covers including Swashbuckler and Beachhead

MacGowan has also created cover art for several video games including TAC, Midway Campaign, Carrier Strike, and Carriers at War.

== Awards ==
- After winning the Charles S. Roberts Award for "Best Professional Magazine" from 1978 to 1983, Fire & Movement was inducted into the Origins/GAMA Hall of Fame in 1999, and MacGowan himself was also inducted in 2004.
- In 2004, at ConsimWorld Expo, MacGowan received the "Ed Blomgren/Winston Hamilton Memorial Award for Lifetime Achievement", and the same year MacGowan's company RBM was awarded the "Academy of Adventure Gaming Hall of Fame Award".
- Several wargames with art and graphics designed by MacGowan have won industry awards for graphic design, including Modern Naval Battles (1989 James F. Dunnigan Award for Playability and Design).
- In 2025, MacGowan was inducted into the Charles S. Roberts Wargaming Hall of Fame.
