= The Grenadier (magazine) =

Wargaming magazine, 1978-1990

Cover of first issue, January 1978

The Grenadier (or Grenadier Magazine) was a quarterly games publication founded in 1978 that ran for 35 issues. The magazine focused on reviews and discussions of various wargames and related products. It ceased publication in 1990.

== History ==
The Grenadier evolved from Game Designers Workshop's Europa Newsletter in 1978. This periodical was originally titled The Paper Soldier, with the first issue appearing under the new banner The Grenadier Wargaming Quarterly in January 1978. The first issue of this name was digest size (5½" by 8½") with just 32 pages, and dealt exclusively with Game Designers Workshop products with general military history regarding the subjects of those games. Beginning with Issue 4, other company's games began to be discussed.

In 1980, The Grenadier was slated by their publisher for discontinuance, and Issue 12, dated January 1981, was the last issue published by Game Designers Workshop. Jeffery Tibbetts offered to continue publication, and a takeover was effected with Issue 13, dated June 1981, being the first published by J Tibbetts & Son. That issue was physically printed by Tibbetts and son Robert on a press in the garage of author Thomas J. Bates.

Issue 14 saw the move to a larger, magazine style format (8½" × 11"), abandoning the "digest" size. Tibbets assumed the role of editor, which he maintained until Issue 35. In that issue, he gave the following farewell:

It is with a mixture of great pride and a certain amount of bittersweetness that I announce that this is the last issue of The Grenadier to be done by the current Editorial Staff.

The irregularity which has become a hallmark of The Grenadier has been the product of my personal incapacities to juggle multiple priorities - being a husband, parent, corporate publishing executive, and simple Editor - these have caballed against my most excellent intentions and pious pronouncements to delay the important transfer of information from the Seats of Power to You, the Readers.

It would be both easy and facile for me to slip into a slough of self-pity brought about by the betrayal of Others, Named and Un-named. That would, however, be self-analysis...I have tried to do more that(sic) I have been personally capable of fulfilling. That is both my pride and my sin...

I am pleased to tell you all that Dr. Jay Selover, former Editor of Fire & Movement has agreed to assume the editorship of The Grenadier and that he is prepared to work toward a monthly schedule. (Gasps of horror and incredulity!)

In bestowing upon Dr. Selover the Editorial Dignity of The Grenadier, I am passing my complete Trust in his understanding of the topology of Wargaming, his ability to marshall excellence from contributors, and his abiding faith that games are for fun.

Despite this pronouncement, no subsequent issues were ever published.

Pacific Rim Publishing also produced CounterAttack magazine, BattleTechnology magazine, and Animag.

== Reception ==
In Issue 27 of the British wargaming magazine Perfidious Albion, Charles Vasey reviewed the first issue, liked the content and found the book review "rather good." Vasey concluded, "Quite a promising start, although obviously lacking in certain categories of articles which should appear in response to the magazine."

== Reviews ==
- Perfidious Albion #29 (July 1978) p.11
- Perfidious Albion #35 (January 1979) p.17
- Perfidious Albion #45 (February 1980) p.19
