= Perfidious Albion (magazine) =

Boardgame and wargame magazine

Perfidious Albion was a British board game and wargame magazine, published and edited by Charles Vasey and Geoff Barnard.

== History ==
In the early 1970s, Charles Vasey, a chartered accountant and wargames hobbyist, began to write reviews of the games that he played for small games magazines such as Military Modelling and Strategy & Tactics. Vasey and his acquaintance Geoff Barnard came to believe that other reviews being published at the time were either too deferential to the major game publishers such as SPI, or were written for game designers and publishers, not for the consumers who were buying the games. When the 1975 publication of the popular wargame Tobruk by Avalon Hill resulted in more shallow reviews, Barnard convinced Vasey that they should create a zine dedicated to in-depth, objective and critical reviews of wargames.

The result was Perfidious Albion, a small self-published zine focussed on miniatures and board wargames. It was intermittent in frequency of publication and irregular in size. At the height of its popularity, Vasey said that it had a circulation of about 500.

== Awards ==
- At the 1979 Origins Awards, Perfidious Albion was awarded the 1978 Charles S. Roberts Award as "Best Amateur Wargame Magazine".
- At the 1980 Origins Awards, Perfidious Albion was awarded the 1979 Charles S. Roberts Award as "Best Amateur Wargame Magazine".

== Reviews ==
- Magazines for Libraries, 2000, p. 1058
- Magazines for Libraries, 2006, p. 506
