= Fire & Movement =

American wargaming magazine

- Cover of first issue
- Editor: Rodger B. MacGowan (founder) Eric R. Harvey
- Categories: Miniature wargaming, computer games
- Frequency: Monthly
- Founded: 1975
- First issue: 1976
- Final issue: February 2010
- Company: Diverse Talents Inc. (DTI); World Wide Wargames (3W); Decision Games
- Country: United States
- Website: decisiongames.com

Fire & Movement: The Forum of Conflict Simulation was a magazine devoted to wargames, both traditional board wargames and computer wargames. It was founded by Rodger MacGowan in 1975, and began publication the following year.

In February 1982, Fire & Movement was acquired by Steve Jackson Games. In January 1985 the magazine was sold again to Diverse Talents Inc. (DTI). In 1988, World Wide Wargames (also known as 3W) acquired Diverse Talents Inc. (DTI), publisher of Fire & Movement, Battleplan and Space Gamer, leading to a complete merger of the two companies. 3W then continued on to publish four gaming magazines simultaneously. John Vanore was the only "outsider" appointed to editorial duties, taking the reins of F&M at the time.

F&M is now published by Decision Games. In January 2010, the last "print" edition of the magazine was published. Editing and layout had been outsourced to Jon Compton to preserve the independence of the magazine content, but subscriptions and newsstand sales continued to decline. As of February 2010, Fire & Movement had been redesignated as an online magazine, and is undergoing retooling. Editorial duties have since been assigned to Eric Harvey.

F&M was inducted into the Academy of Adventure Gaming Arts & Design's Hall of Fame in 1999.

== Beginnings ==
Rodger B. MacGowan started wargaming when he was in high school in the late 1960s. After a hiatus due to the Vietnam War (in his words, "girls also had a major impact"), he returned to the hobby in the 1970s with his old playing partners, who had now moved to different cities. They started to correspond with each other about gaming, and MacGowan started to detail the games in a format he referred to as "Battle Report". He included maps and analyses of his games, and his reports proved to be so popular with his friends that he expanded his concept to create his first magazine, entitled Arquebus. Many of the concepts that F&M would later make famous were included, such as game reviews, game reports, hobby news, and feedback analysis from readers. As he became more involved in the writing of Arquebus, a friend suggested "going professional". Using his background as a professional graphic designer in both advertising and magazine production, he approached Baron Publishing Company, who expressed interest in printing the magazine, as long as MacGowan did the work.

MacGowan next contacted Mark Saha, who wrote for The General and Moves magazines. Since he was playtesting the next big release from Avalon Hill — Tobruk — he was able to provide an "inside scoop" for the first issue of F&M. Another concept was born with the first edition, when a copy of the review for Tobruk was sent to the actual developer of the game for fact checking and it was decided to publish his reply word for word. The technique of having developers respond in print to reviews, in the same issue, would be repeated many times over the years.

The title "Fire & Movement" comes from a standard military expression, and MacGowan noticed it as a chapter heading in a military manual and decided it would be more appropriate and recognizable than Arquebus.

== Reception ==
In Issue 6 of Perfidious Albion, Charles Vasey and Geoff Barnard found the first issue of Fire & Movement to be "Professionally printed." and noted that it was "A good first issue in general. As the 'zine is independent very little bias is shown to various products." They also pointed out the content "leans heavily towards battles in [the 20th century]." Vasey and Barnard concluded, "We think this magazine is a useful addition to anyone's bookshelf." Two issues later, Barnard thought the magazine showed improvement, noting, "The magazine concentrates well on the more practical side of the hobby, and furthermore gives a wide coverage in terms of games and companies covered — all in great detail too ... From its present form, this zine deserves to success — one can expect great things from them in the future!"

In Issue 7 of the British wargaming magazine Phoenix, Ralph Vickers reviewed the three issues and noted that the new magazine was "a commercially printed 40-page bi-monthly publication embellished with some of the finest graphics in war-gamedom." Vickers commented, "It is clear that the people producing F&M are independent (because they've already covered games of just about everybody), fearless (because they haven't pulled their punches in their criticism) and they are obviously dedicated to producing a wargaming magazine of major importance."

== Reviews ==
- Perfidious Albion #8 (August 1976) p. 12
- Perfidious Albion #11 (November 1976) p. 19
- Perfidious Albion #13 (January 1977) p. 15
- Perfidious Albion #16 (April 1977) p. 7
- Perfidious Albion #18 (June 1977) p. 17
- Perfidious Albion #20 (April 1977) p. 17
- Perfidious Albion #21 (October 1977) p. 17
- Perfidious Albion #25 (February 1978) p. 13
- Perfidious Albion #29 (July 1978) p. 11
- Perfidious Albion #33 (November 1978) p. 17
- Perfidious Albion #35 (January 1979) p. 17
- Perfidious Albion #39 (May 1979) p. 17
- Perfidious Albion #44 (January 1980) p. 8
- Perfidious Albion #47 (August 1980) p. 13
- Perfidious Albion #48 (October 1980) p. 19
- Imagine #11

== Awards ==
Fire & Movement won the Charles S. Roberts Award for Best Professional Magazine of 1978, of 1979, of 1980, and of 1982.
