= Torgau (wargame) =

Board wargame published in 1974

Cover of rulebook, 1974

Torgau is a board wargame published by Game Designers' Workshop (GDW) in 1974 that simulates the Battle of Torgau between Prussias and Austrians in 1760 during the Seven Years' War, a costly battle for both sides. Reviews were generally favorable, although gameplay was characterized as very long (10–12 hours), complex, and more similar to traditional miniatures wargaming than board wargames.

== Background ==
In November 1760, Field Marshal Leopold Josef Graf Daun arrayed his imperial Austrian forces in a strong defensive position on a hilltop near the town of Torgau in Saxony. Frederick the Great sent his four corps to attack different points of the Austrian perimeter, but due to communications problems, these were not well-coordinated, and Prussian losses mounted. After dusk, when fighting had concluded, a Prussian corps unexpectedly attacked again, catching the Austrians by surprise.

== Description ==
Torgau is a two-player wargame in which one player controls Frederick the Great's Prussians, and the other player the Austrian forces of Field Marshal Daun. With a large 21" x 31" hex grid map scaled at 200 yds (180 m) per hex, 480 counters, and a new rules system based more on traditional miniatures sandbox wargames than board wargames, Torgau has been characterized as "reasonably complex."

== Gameplay ==
=== Setup ===
The Austrian player sets up on the board in any formation or placement desired. On the first turn, the Prussian player can send forces onto the map using any or all of the marked hexes at the edge of the map. However, the Prussians are subject to command control issues, and Prussian units may end up entering at the wrong hex or might march off in the wrong direction.

=== Counters ===
In contrast to most other board wargames, counters do not have a zone of control. Counters also have a front face, which affects the direction of movement and firing. Unlike most board wargames, which either limit the number of counters that can be stacked in the same hex or don't allow stacking, Torgau's stacking limit is 300 soldiers, which must all be placed into either line formation or column formation. Certain types of counters cannot be mixed together in one stack. (For example, cavalry cannot stack with infantry.)

=== Movement and combat ===
The game uses a complex series of movement turns blended with both offensive and defensive fire. Unlike many board wargames, melee combat is not initiated when units are adjacent. Instead, melee combat happens when enemy units occupy the same hex. Combat damage uses a step reduction system, where a unit's strength is gradually reduced as it takes more damage.

=== Scenarios ===
The game comes with only one scenario, a long game of 56 turns that covers the entire battle, where each turn represents 15 minutes of the battle.

== Publication history ==
Torgau was designed by Frank Chadwick, and released as a zip lock bag game by GDW in 1974.

== Reception ==
In the November 1975 issue of Airfix Magazine, Bruce Quarrie commented, "A considerable degree of sophistication is achieved with simple rules and devices, and after the opening moves [...] the game becomes fast and exciting. It forcefully brings home the principles of battlefield tactics and a single slip can bring disaster." Quarrie concluded, "Altogether a well-produced game and recommended."

In the inaugural issue of Perfidious Albion, Charles Vasey called this "a rather long, complex game. It suffers from a lack of period feel, and yet it is the best simulation [of this period] available ... Nevertheless in its present form, Torgau is almost unplayable."

In a 1976 poll conducted by Simulations Publications to determine the most popular board wargames in North America, Torgau was rated very highly, placing an excellent 7th out of 202 games.

In his 1977 book The Comprehensive Guide to Board Wargaming, Nick Palmer called this game "admirable for its detail but slower than less precise games." He noted that "Command control problems plague Frederick as he marches onto the battlefield, with a difficult dilemma between a safe approach and a fast one." Palmer concluded, "A large but not unmanageable game." In his 1980 sequel, The Best of Board Wargaming , Palmer gave the game an Excitement grade of 60%, saying, "A long game with too many die-rolls for comfort and a strong edge to defending troops which forces both players to exercise caution, but an interesting simulation of a rarely seen war."

In Issue 8 of the UK wargaming magazine Phoenix, Tony Dinsdale characterized the stacking limit rule as "quite revolutionary and requires some thought." He also thought that "where the game really draws my vote is the wealth of strategies available to both sides, but especially the Prussian." Dinsdale concluded that Torgau was "a good simulation of the period and is most professionally presented. [...] It is good to know that in these days of world recession Torgau is wonderful value for money in all respects."

In The Guide to Simulations/Games for Education and Training, Martin Campion commented on the game as an educational aid, saying, "The game is difficult but seems faithful to eighteenth-century warfare. There are many ways of dividing the sides up among several commanders."

In the 1980 book The Complete Book of Wargames, game designer Jon Freeman wrote that the then five-year-old game "was an important — if flawed — game" since it had led to the development of larger games such as La Bataille de la Moskowa and Terrible Swift Sword. Freeman questioned the overworking of the rules, noting that "Torgau has a wealth of design ideas but some poor development". He also felt that the game was unbalanced in favor of the Austrians, commenting that "it takes a superior Prussian player to beat the Austrian." Freeman concluded by giving the game an Overall Evaluation of "Fair but Significant", saying, "Despite its overworked fire system and opaque rules, Torgau is tense, if tough, game."

== Other reviews and commentary ==
- Fire & Movement #3
- Panzerfaust #67
- Strategy & Tactics #43 & #49
- Moves #31, p10-11
