= The Battle of Lobositz =

1978 Napoleonic board wargame

- Rulebook cover, 1978 ziplock bag edition
- Designers: Frank Chadwick
- Illustrators: Rich Banner
- Publishers: Gametime Games
- Publication: 1978
- Genres: Pre-Napoleonic

The Battle of Lobositz is a board wargame published by Game Designers' Workshop (GDW) in 1978 that simulates the Battle of Lobositz. The game was part of GDW's "120 Series" that featured games with 120 counters that could be learned and played in less than 120 minutes.

== Background ==
In late August 1756, Frederick the Great invaded Saxony, the opening move in what was to become the Seven Years' War. After a month of campaigning, Frederick led his army of 28,000 south through Bohemia to establish a winter base. Unbeknownst to Frederick, Maximilian Ulysses Count von Browne, commander of 33,000 Austrians, had laid a trap for Frederick at the town of Lobositz (modern day Lovosice in the Czech Republic), knowing that the Prussians would be emerging from a narrow mountain pass in order to cross the River Elbe. On the morning of 1 October 1756, the Prussians marched through thick fog and into the trap.

== Description ==
The Battle of Lobositz is a wargame for two players in which one controls the Prussians, and the other controls the Austrians. The game starts with the valley in thick fog for the first six turns of the game.

=== Gameplay ===
The game system uses a series of "I Go, You Go" alternating turns. Each player, on their turn, takes the following phases:

1. Movement: Demoralized units move first, and their panic has a chance to spread to other units on their side.
2. Attempt to rally demoralized units who are retreating.
3. Offensive fire: Any units that did not move can fire. The result is based on the attacker's strength and a die roll, modified by terrain and the defender's type.
4. Defensive Fire: The non-active player has a chance to return fire against attackers that are within range.
5. Melee: Attacking units that moved adjacent to an enemy unit during the movement phase now can attack with bayonets. The result is a comparison of the attacker's morale plus the attacker's total strength plus a die roll versus the defender's morale plus the defender's total strength plus a die roll. Whichever value is higher wins the skirmish; the losers are demoralized, must retreat, and lose a strength point.

Each turn represents 30 minutes of the battle, and the game lasts for 16 turns.

=== Victory conditions ===
The Prussian win if they can either sweep the board of all Austrian units, or capture both Lobosch Heights AND all eleven hexes of the town of Lobositz by the end of Turn 16.

The Austrians win by denying the Prussians their victory conditions.

== Publication history ==
In the mid-1970s, large and complex board wargames such as Drang Nach Osten! and Terrible Swift Sword were very popular among experienced gamers, but were impossible to play in a single session, and were very difficult for new players to learn. In response, GDW created "Series 120", smaller and less complex games that used no more than 120 counters and that would take less than 120 minutes to learn and play. The first of these was The Battle of Raphia, 217 B.C., published in 1977. Over the next four years, GDW would publish a dozen "Series 120" games, including The Battle of Lobositz in 1978, designed by Frank Chadwick, with artwork by Rich Banner, and released as both a ziplock bag game and a boxed set.

In 2002, Kokusai-Tsushin Co. (国際通信社) translated the game into Japanese and published it in Issue 45 of Command Japan.

== Reception ==
In Issue 34 of the British wargaming magazine Perfidious Albion, Charles Vasey and Geoffrey Barnard discussed the game. Vasey commented, "Nice stuff this ... The rules appear totally without holes (sorry chaps, but damned if we could find any)." Vasey did suggest that deployment of the Prussians should be done randomly to simulate Frederick's lack of knowledge about the Austrian set-up. "This way the Prussian does not know what he must do." Barnard did not agree with Vasey's very positive assessment, replying, "I cannot say I was madly impressed with this game. It does work, OK, and it seems to play reasonably accurately, it just seems all a bit odd ... The melee combat system which seemed quite appropriate for the Guilford Courthouse game struck me as rather strange for this game." Vasey concluded, "The game is quick, morale is neat and fire accurate ... All in all, superior design work." Barnard concluded, "The game plays along [and] the almost hidden movement early in the game is of some interest."

In Issue 22 of the British game magazine Phoenix, Rob Gibson called this "a most unusual choice of subject for a popular series of simulation games ... However, the choice is an excellent one ... The situation is such that it will not allow any passive manoeuvering, but demands instant action." Gibson had few complaints about the game other than a few suggestions on minor revisions to the cavalry rules.

In his 1980 book The Best of Board Wargaming, Nicky Palmer called this "quite a respectable simulation of the period" but noted that the actual playing time was double the advertised time of 120 minutes. Palmer also didn't think the colour-coding on the map of foggy areas was correct, but did admit that the fog "adds an enjoyable claustrophobic feeling to the game." Palmer concluded by giving this game an Excitement grade of 35%, saying, "Pleasant, brisk, and a good introduction to pre-twentieth-century concepts."

== Other reviews and commentary ==
- The Wargamer #11
- Strategy & Tactics #13
