= Red Star/White Eagle =

1979 board wargame

- Cover art by Rodger B. MacGowan
- Designers: David Williams
- Illustrators: Rodger B. MacGowan
- Publishers: GDW
- Publication: 1979
- Genres: Post-World War I war

Red Star/White Eagle, subtitled "The Russo-Polish War, 1920", is a board wargame published by Game Designers' Workshop (GDW) in 1979 that simulates the Russo–Polish War of 1920 that followed World War I and the Russian Revolution.

== Background ==
Following the collapse of the Central Powers at the end of World War I, the newly independent Poland attempted to push its boundaries outwards, while at the same time the newly formed Soviet Union sought to take over Poland, since Vladimir Lenin viewed the new country as a critical route for spreading communist revolutions into Europe. In 1920, after Poland captured Kyiv, the Russian army pushed Polish forces back to Warsaw, and the two sides clashed at the critical Battle of Warsaw.

== Description ==
Red Star/White Eagle is a two-player game where one player controls Polish forces and the other player controls Soviet forces. The game uses an alternating "I Go, You Go" system, where one player adds reinforcements and replacements, moves and fires, followed by the other player. Special rules cover armored trains, minor nationalities (Galicia, Ukraine, Lithuania, etc.), and tank breakdowns. The 73 cm x 58 cm hex grid map scaled at 23 kilometres (14 mi) per hex covers Eastern Europe, including eastern and central Poland, western Soviet Union, the Danzig Corridor, eastern Prussia and central Lithuania.

=== Set up ===
Each counter shows attack and defense factors, movement rate, and "delay" factor. Although the hex grid map is numbered, there is no starting hex printed on each counter because starting locations of counters vary depending on the scenario chosen. As a result, players start the game by placing up to 300 counters in their starting positions according to a printed list. As critic Frédéric Armand noted, "Setting up scenarios is a slow and painful (lower back) task. "

=== Movement ===
The Soviet forces must start the game divided by the Pripet River into a West Front — heading towards Kyiv — and a Southwest Front — heading towards Minsk — and cannot join together until they pass the Bug River deep in Poland.

In most wargames of the time, a unit must stop in an enemy unit's zone of control (ZOC). In this game, a unit moving into a ZOC must pay an extra movement cost equal to the largest delay factor an enemy unit exerts upon each hex being entered.

Hexes with terrain (mountains, swamps, etc.) cost triple the usual movement factors unless the unit is moving down a railroad, in which case movement is unlimited as long as the unit starts and finishes on a friendly railroad.

=== Strategy ===
Critic John Kula noted that like the Russo-Polish War where offense and movement were valued over static defense, "The mechanics of the simulation definitely favor the offensive and penalize the defensive. On the whole, the Poles are imbued with the cavalry tradition and notorious for their martial spirit. They may not have known that this war was to be their crowning glory, but their aggressiveness suggested otherwise." Brian Muldoon agreed with this assessment, writing, "From the lead in, it is apparent that Red Star/White Eagle is a game of movement and attack."

=== Scenarios ===
The game comes with three scenarios:

- The Gates of Warsaw: The battle for Poland
- The Campaign Game: The Poles take Kyiv before the Soviets force them back.
- The Belorussian Scenario

There are a number of variants as well:

- Three-Player Game: Three players control the Poles, the Russian Western Front and the Russian Southwestern Front.
- The March to the West: To reward Lenin's original vision of Soviet troops entering Germany to foment a proletarian revolution, the Soviet player gains victory points if, at the end of any game turn, there is a supplied Russian unit adjacent to the western edge of the map.
- The Red Scare: If Russian units enter Germany, the Polish player receives German Freikorps as replacements.
- Polish Troops Use the Upper Silesian Railway
- Skullduggery in Danzig: The Poles can trace a rail supply line to Danzig, but the Soviets can counter by bringing a number of Danzig dockworkers out on strike for a number of turns.

Other variants included free deployment, Partisans in the Ukraine, Ukrainian Nationalism, and Kościuszko's Squadron of aeroplanes.

=== Victory conditions ===
If the Soviets occupy Warsaw, then the game ends immediately with a Soviet victory. Otherwise, all of the cities on the map are worth varying number of Victory Points, which add up to 38 points. The player at the end of the game who has occupied cities worth between 20 and 27 points wins a minor victory. Accumulating 28 Victory Points is a major victory.

== Publication history ==
David Williams designed Red Star/White Eagle, which was published by GDW in 1979 with cover art by Rodger B. MacGowan.

In 2018, Compass Games republished a revised edition of the game titled "Red Star/White Eagle: The Russo-Polish War, 1920 – Designer Signature Edition." In 2022, Banana Games published a Chinese-language version of this edition titled "红星/白鹰：苏波战争" ("Red Star/White Eagle: Soviet-Polish War").

== Reception ==
In Issue 45 of the British wargaming magazine Perfidious Albion, Charles Vasey made an in-depth analysis of the game and concluded, "It's a game full of play-value, and does take time, but it's time spent playing, not checking the Pasta Rules, or counting your spell points. All this and cavalry — simply super."

In Issue 27 of The Wargamer, Brian Muldoon commented, "Red Star/White Eagle can rightly take its place in the hobby for being a very good game which covers the period extremely realistically."

In Issue 9 of the French games magazine Casus Belli, Frédéric Armand called this "a game that deserves a place on your game library shelves, especially if you prioritize two factors: playability and realism."

In a retrospective review written 30 years after the game's publication, John Kula noted that the Russo-Polish War had not been well-covered by wargames of the 1970s, pointing out, "GDW was able to build on the uncommon factor and develop an excellent simulation of a fascinating situation, just as they did with Beda Fomm." Kula thought the physical components were good compared to contemporaneous games, commenting, "In its time, GDW’s graphics and physical presentation were second to none. Their simple but effective use of strong color, legible fonts and basic graphics was a trademark that set them apart and made them instantly recognizable."
