= Battle for Midway: Decision in the Pacific, 1942 =

Cover of the rulebook, with artwork by Rodger B. MacGowan, 1976

Battle for Midway: Decision in the Pacific, 1942 is a board wargame published by Game Designers' Workshop (GDW) in 1976 that simulates the Battle of Midway during World War II.

== Background ==
In June 1942, six months after the Attack on Pearl Harbor, Japan sought to ambush an American fleet near Midway Island and take control of the island in order to extend their defensive perimeter and offensive capabilities against Fiji, Samoa and Hawaii. However, American codebreakers were able to read the Japanese orders, and the Americans planned a trap of their own, setting up one of the most important naval engagements of the war.

== Description ==
Battle for Midway is a two-player wargame in which one player controls American forces and the other controls Japanese forces. The game, which takes 6-10 hours to play, features submarines, initiative, invasion, combat air patrol, air combat in waves, and storms. The game is relatively complex, including 2 hex grid maps, 480 die-cut counters, an extensive rulebook and several players' aids.

== Publication history ==
Battle for Midway was designed by Marc Miller, and was published by GDW in 1976 as a ziplock bag game. The rulebook artwork by Rodger B. MacGowan served as the game's front cover.

== Reception ==
In the 1977 book The Comprehensive Guide to Board Wargaming, Nick Palmer called the game "Another sizable GDW production, filled with detail", and noted that "Unfortunately, many of the interesting features [...] are ineffective or have an odd effect on the game, and the full-length game adds almost nothing to the abbreviated one. Plenty of potential, but purchasers should experiment with rule modifications." In his 1980 sequel, The Best of Board Wargaming , Palmer added "A very strange game going well beyond Avalon Hill's simple Midway to little apparent effect." Palmer recommended several rule changes to improve the game. He concluded, "As it stands, it looks to me like a rush job with enthusiasm outpacing testing." Palmer gave the game a very poor "Excitement grade" of only 25%.

In Issue 9 of the UK wargaming magazine Phoenix, Rob Gibson compared Midway to GDW's previously published Coral Sea (1974), and wrote "the new simulation shows considerable additions to the use of ships and aircraft.' In effect, this makes it a more sophisticated simulation." Gibson concluded on a positive note, calling the game "a first-class sim ulation of the battle that destroyed the Japanese capability to wage an offensive naval campaign and passed the initiative to the United States."

In The Guide to Simulations/Games for Education and Training, Martin Campion called this game "a good strategic simulation, and it is not very detailed tactically." He suggested for classroom use that the teacher could use a fully secret movement and search system.

== Other reviews and commentary ==
- Fire & Movement 67
- Panzerfaust & Campaign #76
- Games & Puzzles #57
