= Crimea: The Dawn of Modern Warfare =

Cover of rulebook

Crimea: The Dawn of Modern Warfare is a board wargame published by Game Designers' Workshop (GDW) in 1975 that simulates the Crimean War.

== Background ==
In 1853, Russia and the Ottoman Empire went to war, with England and France backing the Ottomans, hoping to maintain the current European balance of power in the Concert of Europe. When Russia scored several victories against the Ottoman Empire, England and France entered the war against Russia, and made Sevastopol their main objective, hoping that its surrender would force Russia to sue for peace.

== Description ==
Crimea is a two-player wargame where one player controls the Alliance, and the other controls the Russians. The game is very complex, having a relatively large 22" x 28" hex grid mapsheet subdivided into a strategic map and four smaller tactical maps, 450 double-sided die-cut counters, a large rulebook and many charts and game aids.

=== Gameplay ===
In contrast to most wargames of the mid-1970s that used a simple alternating "I Go, You Go" system of turns, Crimea mixes movement and combat from both players in an open-ended structure that does not end until combat peters out. Each Tactical Turn is divided into three segments:

1. Fortifiation construction
2. Strategic movement
3. Action

The Action segment only happens when opposing units are adjacent to one another, or if the Allied player during the Strategic movement segment declares an intention to fire siege guns. Either of these situations instigates the Action segment, which is a complex series of phases involving both players:

- Simultaneous fire phase;
- Allied: Siege fire commitment phase;
- Russian: Disrupted defender movement phase;
- Allied: Attacker movement phase;
- Allied: Siege fire resolution phase;
- Russian: Fortification repair phase;
- Russian: Hold fire resolution phase (units that did not fire during the Simultaneous Fire phase may now fire at adjacent enemy units);
- Allied: Attacker melee phase;
- Russian:: Defender undisrupted movement phase;
- Allied: Hold fire phase;
- Russian: Defender melee phase.

At this point, if opposing units are still adjacent to each other, then another Action segment happens immediately. This cycle of Action segments continues until no opposing units are adjacent to each other at the end of an Action segment. Play then returns to a new Tactical Turn. If three Tactical Turns take place without any melee combat, then the battle comes to an end.

=== Scenarios ===
The game comes with Basic and Advanced rules.

- The Basic game is only centered on the siege of Sevastopol.
- The Advanced game offers six scenarios that simulate the major battles of the war:
- Battle of Alma, 20 September 1854
- Battle of Balaklava, 25 October 1854
- Battle of Inkermann, 5 November 1854)
- Battle of Eupatoria, 17 February 1855
- Battle of the Chernaya, 16 August 1855
- Battle of Malakoff, 8 September 1855

These can be combined into a long campaign game that simulates the entire war. There is also a smaller "micro-game" included that simulates the Charge of the Light Brigade during the Battle of Balaklava.

== Publication history ==
Crimea was designed by Frank Chadwick and published as a ziplock bag game by GDW in 1975. The game initially sold well, and in a 1976 poll conducted by Simulations Publications Inc. to determine the most popular wargames in North America, Crimea was ranked very highly, placing 7th out of 202 games. By 1980, initial popularity had faded, and game critic Nick Palmer reported that "This game deserves to be played more frequently than it is. In part, lack of interest in it stems from the very unusual rules."

== Reception ==
In Issue 1 of Phoenix, Dave Mylie thought that the game was good value, saying "Physically the game is beyond criticism and definitely value for money." But although he found the rules "well written and clearly indexed", Mylie felt that the innovative actions system should have been explained better; he also highlighted some rule ambiguities, commenting, "the rules can be something of a problem and the player may find he has to do a little rule writing himself at times." He also warned that "The play of a tactical segment can take several hours and as there are twenty three strategic turns it can be a very, very long game." Nonetheless, he concluded with a positive note, saying, "Whether a player is looking for a relatively simple, complex, long or short game, Crimea provides the answer with its battle, basic and campaign games. It generates such a feel for the period that it must be regarded as a classic."

In Issue 17 of the British wargaming magazine Perfidious Albion, several critics took turns analyzing this game. John Poole noted "There is a good historical feel to the game, but ... there is too much emphasis on historical unit accuracy at the expense of command and doctrine rules." Charles Vasey commented, "The rules were chock fulla holes ... I did not like the meshing of movement and time and felt it was the reason I would not play it again." Geoffrey Barnard pointed out that in most games, "players are often able to make splendid, finely calculated moves that would just never be made in a real battle. Crimea's one hex per turn battle rules are therefore for me much more satisfying.. It is so pleasing to see a battle slowly disintegrate as each side gets an increasing number of its units disrupted due to morale."

In his 1977 book The Comprehensive Guide to Board Wargaming, Nick Palmer commented "This game's enthusiastic reception from the hard-core[gamers] demonstrates the potential interest of this subject." He also noted that the "Innovative combat system reinfoces correct period 'feel'." Palmer concluded "Another delight for aficionados, intimidating for beginners." Three years later, in his 1980 sequel, The Best of Board Wargaming , Palmer added "Sadly, there are some holes in the rules; these are being cleared up slowly but steadily." For this reason, Palmer warned "do not make my mistake and plunge straight into the campaign game." He concluded by giving the game an "Excitement Grade" of only 50%, saying, "This game is first and foremost for enthusiasts of the period, and is not suitable for novices."

In the 1980 book The Complete Book of Wargames, game designer Jon Freeman noted "This is a unique game; nothing like it has been done before — or since." However, Freeman found that "the problem is that the game isn't really a game. There's too much jockeying for position (as opposed to maneuvering for position) [...] And, like history, the game bogs down around Sevastopol." He concluded by giving it an Overall Evaluation of "Fair to Good", saying, "It is an interesting design, and for that it may be worth inspection."

In The Guide to Simulations/Games for Education and Training, Martin Campion was not impressedd, saying, "Several of the rules, especially those having to do with battles, are poorly thought out or poorly presented."

== Other reviews and commentary ==
- Fire & Movement #7
- Panzerfaust #69
- Games & Puzzles #70
