= Battle for Moscow (wargame) =

Board wargame published in 1986

Battle for Moscow is a short and simple board wargame published by Game Designers' Workshop (GDW) in 1986 that simulates Operation Typhoon, the German attempt to quickly capture Moscow during the opening days of their surprise invasion of the Soviet Union in 1941 during World War II. The game was designed as a free giveaway to try to introduce new players to wargaming.

== Background ==
On 22 June 1941, less than two years after signing the non-aggression Molotov–Ribbentrop Pact with the Soviet Union, Germany attacked across a wide front. One of their key strategic goals was the capture of Moscow, in an operation code-named "Typhoon". The Russians desperately struggled to halt the German offense before this goal could be attained.

== Description ==
Battle for Moscow is a two-player wargame where one player controls the Russian forces and the other player controls the Germans. With a small 8.5" x 11" hex grid map, only 4 pages of rules and 39 counters, the game has been characterized as "easy to learn".

=== Set up ===
The Russians set up their counters on pre-determined hexes. The Germans can set up their forces anywhere within a specific area.

=== Gameplay ===
The game system uses an alternating "I Go, You Go" series of turns divided into four phases:

1. Add Reinforcements
2. Special Movement: During the German turn, the German player can move their tanks. During the Russian turn, the Russian player can move units via railways.
3. Combat: All units of the active player that are adjacent to an enemy may attack if the attacker's strength is equal to or more than the defender's strength.
4. General Move: All units, including those that moved during the Special Movement phase, can move.

The German player completes all four phases, followed by the Russian player. This completes one turn, which represents 1 week of game time.

As an introductory wargame, the game uses

- "sticky" zones of control (a unit must stop if it comes within one hex of an enemy unit and can't leave until it or the enemy unit is destroyed)
- combat damage determined by a Combat Results Table (CRT) (the ratio of attacker strength to defender strength is referred to on the CRT, and a die roll is used to determine the result)
- step reduction damage (the first damage taken reduces a unit to half strength, the next hit eliminates it)
- terrain's effects on movement and combat
- the effect of muddy conditions as winter sets in

Unlike more complex wargames, counters cannot be stacked.

=== Victory conditions ===
The game ends after seven turns. The player in possession of Moscow at the end of the game is the winner.

== Publication history ==
In the 1970s, most wargame manufacturers were producing complex "monster" wargames with thousands of counters like Drang Nach Osten! (GDW, 1972), Rise and Decline of the Third Reich (Avalon Hill, 1974), and The Campaign for North Africa (SPI, 1978). After a downturn in the market for these large and very lengthy games, publishers started to produce simpler games to try to develop a new audience. One of these was Battle for Moscow, designed by Frank Chadwick at GDW, and included as a free game with every mail order purchase.

With the demise of GDW in 1996, Chadwick allowed the game to be posted on the internet, and the website Grognard started to offer it as a free download.

In 2001, Kokusai-Tsushin Co., Ltd. (国際通信社) published a Japanese-language version in Command #39.

In 2009, the game was revised by Victory Point Games as a solitaire game and republished as Battle for Moscow: Operation Typhoon, 1941. The company also published an expansion kit in 2011 that extended the game into the spring of 1942.

In 2016, Victory Point Games combined the solitaire game and its expansion into Battle for Moscow II.

In 2020, a Web-based version of the game was released by Ober Labs. It support both standard and tournament rules in a guided beginner-friendly user interface, with both a solitaire/hotseat option playing on the same browser and an AI opponent.

== Reception ==
In Issue 62 of Fire & Movement, Rick Swan wrote, "It is difficult to imagine a more painless introduction to wargaming that this. Though easy to learn, it's not necessarily easy to win." Swan concluded, "It's more enjoyable that many (if not most) magazine games. A much-needed and superbly executed product"

In Issue 5 of Simulacrum, Joe Scoleri noted "GDW's [free game] was especially effective. The straightforward rules take nothing for granted and nearly everything that could thwart a newcomer is carefully explained."

In Issue 19 of Simulacrum, written almost twenty years after the game's original publication, John Kula commented, "Battle for Moscow is a simple and relatively painless introduction to wargaming ... the game could continue to do duty as an introduction to wargaming."

== Awards ==
Battle for Moscow was a finalist for a Charles S. Roberts Award in the category "Best World War II Game of 1986."

== Other reviews and commentary ==
- Battleplan #7
