= Beda Fomm (wargame) =

Board wargame published in 1979

Cover of the first edition "ziplock bag" game, 1979

Beda Fomm, subtitled "Wavell in the Western Desert, 1941", is a board wargame published by Game Designer's Workshop (GDW) in 1979 that simulates the Battle of Beda Fomm during World War II. The game was part of GDW's "120 System", games that contained 120 counters, and supposedly could be played in 120 minutes.

== Background ==
In late 1940 and early 1941, British successes in Tunisia and Libya against the Italian 10th Army during Operation Compass sent the Italians into a retreat along the Mediterranean coastal road. In order to stall the retreat, General Archibald Wavell sent a small British force racing through the desert around the Italians. On 5 February 1941, the task force set up a road block at Beda Fomm, hoping to stall the 150,000 Italian soldiers long enough for the rest of the British army to arrive and force a surrender.

== Description ==
Beda Fomm is a two-player wargame where one player controls the British forces setting up an ambush, and the other controls the Italians trying to break through and escape. As a relatively simple game, it has a small 17" x 22" paper hex grid map, only 120 counters, and a short 4-page rulebook.

=== Gameplay ===
The game starts with the Italians entering the map on the north edge of the map. Beda Fomm uses an alternating turn sequence, starting with the Italian player:

1. Movement Phase: The active player moves. No non-armored unit can enter the zone of control of an enemy armored unit unless the non-armored unit is stacked with an armored unit.
2. Barrage Phase: Both sides may fire artillery. The active player may choose either Interdiction (affects enemy movement) or Attack (affects enemy morale); the inactive player may only use Attack.
3. Anti-Tank Phase: Both sides may fire on enemy tanks.
4. Combat Phase: The active player fires.

Then the British player is given the same opportunity using the same phases. This completes one turn, which represents one daylight hour. There are two overnight moves each night, but units are not allowed to enter any enemy zone of control, and no combat is allowed. The game lasts for a maximum of 28 turns.

=== Victory conditions ===
The Italian player wins by exiting between 3 and 6 units off the south side of the map. The British player wins by preventing this.

== Publication history ==
Beda Fomm was designed by Frank Chadwick and was published by GDW in 1979 as a ziplock bag game in their "120 System", a series of short, relatively simple games with only 120 counters that could be played in less than 120 minutes. The game was also released as a boxed set.

In 2009, Kokusai-Tsushin Co. (国際通信社) published a Japanese edition titled "ベダ・フォム" (Beda Fomm) in Command #89 (November 2009).

In 2010, Consim Press published an updated and revised version of the game with much more detailed rules.

== Reception ==
In Issue 98 of Campaign, Kevin Pollock noted that "This situation could have easily become the traditional boring slugfest normally associated with games on North Africa, but, thanks to some nice design work by Frank Chadwick, is instead one that is both tense and interesting." Pollock admired the unusual turn sequence, saying, "Because of this turn structure each element of the two armies has its own strengths and weaknesses which make it a truly combined arms game." Pollock concluded, "BF is an unusual game but one that can be very exciting and challenging. Perhaps more important than this, however, is that Beda Fomm is fun to play."

In Issue 49 of the British wargaming magazine Perfidious Albion, Charles Vasey commented, "a simple version of Operation Crusader in that combat is divided into Barrage, Anti-tank and Combat. The rules are quick and easy to read." Vasey concluded, "This is not a game of 'cowardly [Italians]', especially with some good morale, bersaglieri [sharpshooters] and armour." Two issues later, Vasey called the game "magnificent ... The system seems to combine so much of Crusader and Suez '73 [GDW, 1981] yet it does so with so much grace that one is staggered that one small game could hold all it knew." Vasey concluded, "My only criticism (honest) is that you cannot play it is two hours, its a five hour game with careful play. Its the best value in historical gaming at the minute. Get it."

In the 1980 book The Best of Board Wargaming, contributor Marcus Watney commented "Given unlimited time and resources, it is not difficult to design a superlative game; but within the restraints of the 120 System (120 counters, two hours playing time) anyone who succeeds deserves extra recognition and praise. Frank Chadwick has done so." Watney also noted "The most impressive facet of the design is the inclusion of sophisticated morale rules." He concluded by giving Beda Fomm an "Excitement Grade" of 90%, saying, "This game is highly recommended."

In Issue 24 of the UK wargaming magazine Phoenix, Roger Jordan commented "It is refreshing to see a game dealing with the desert war that doesn't consist of hordes of Panzers." He called the rules "clear and concise", but warned players to "read every sentence or you will miss something." He concluded "In short, a real nailbiter, combining just the right amount of skill and luck [...] Strongly recommended to everyone except those with weak hearts or nervous dispositions."

In a retrospective review in Issue 5 of Simulacrum, John Kula commented "Beda Fomm is an elegant game in many respects. Its simplicity is elegant. It is the only exclusive simulation of this battle that I'm aware of [...] And it is one of a very few simulations of a meeting engagement." Kula concluded, "Beda Fomm can be a close game, just as the battle was a close-run thing."

== Awards ==
At the 2010 Charles S. Roberts Awards, the Consim Press edition of Beda Fomm was a finalist for "Best World War II Era Board Wargame".

== Other reviews and commentary ==
- Fire & Movement #20 and #60
- The Grenadier #15
- Panzerfaust #54
- Strategy & Tactics #40 & 78
- Casus Belli (Issue 11 - Nov 1982)
