= Belter (board game) =

Science fiction board game

Mining the Asteroids, 2076
- Box cover
- Designers: Frank Chadwick; Marc Miller
- Publishers: Game Designers' Workshop
- Publication: 1979; 47 years ago
- Genres: Science fiction

Belter, subtitled "Mining the Asteroids, 2076", is a science fiction board game published by Game Designers' Workshop (GDW) in 1979.

== Gameplay ==
Belter: Mining the Asteroids, 2076 is a science fiction board game set in the Asteroid Belt in the year 2076. Players take the role of miners ("belters") looking for strikes of tradeable goods such as ore, natural gas or antimatter. The game is a combination of economics, power politics, combat and movement mechanics. The advanced game has rules introducing a quasi-independent Peace Keeping Force, and the possibility of rebellion against an oppressive Terran authority.

== Publication history ==
Belter was designed by Frank Chadwick and Marc Miller, and was published by GDW in 1979.

== Reception ==
In the 1980 book The Best of Board Wargaming, Graham Beckell called this "primarily an economic game." He noted that "Lazy players should be warned that there is a lot of book-keeping involved. It is worth devising some book-keeping aids as none are provided." Beckell concluded by giving the game an average "excitement" grade of 70%, saying, "Once the game is mastered Belter offers much scope for inventive players to expand the rules."

In the first issue of Ares Magazine, David Ritchie found it to be "an interesting product with much to recommend it. Moderately complex, and playable in an afternoon."

In the March–April 1980 edition of The Space Gamer (Issue No. 27) Mike L. Maloney found Belter to be good but complex. "Belter is a very playable game and should be highly recommended to S-F players. A word of warning, though; if you are just getting into gaming, you might wait to play this game until you have more experience. Belter can be a real challenge."

In the May 1980 edition of Dragon (Issue 37), Roberto Camino was not overly impressed. "Belter is not a bad game, it is just not an exciting one. It’s a good example of why economic, political, and social simulations never displaced conflict simulations as the mainstay of the hobby, or even really supplemented them, for that matter." He found the game a bit dull, although it had no major flaws. "It’s not a blockbuster..., rather, it is another one of GDW’s solid line of science-fiction games which the buyer can rely on to be playable, enjoyable, and generally worth the asking price."

In Issue 29 of Phoenix (January–February 1981), Terry Devereaux wondered why so much space in the rulebook was devoted to combat and buying weapons when the object of the game was to collect the most money. He concluded, "In my opinion, the game of Belter should be one thing, or the other. At the moment it is a weakly based Science Fiction monetary race game, with the added incidental of the possibility of having combat. Yet it would be in the participant's best interest, if anyone plays the game, NOT to have combat."

In a retrospective review in Issue 5 of Simulacrum, written in 1999, Joe Scoleri commented, "With the influx of 'theme over simulation' oriented German games, it is unlikely that we will ever see many board games like Belter again. Today's rendition of Belter would no doubt be a highly abstracted game with large glossy components and little simulation feel. This writer still tends to prefer games that offer a rich simulation feel, and Belter delivers!"
