= Citadel: The Battle of Dien Bien Phu =

1977 First Indochina War board wargame

Cover art by Rodger B. MacGowan

Citadel:The Battle of Dien Bien Phu is a board wargame published by Game Designers Workshop (GDW) in 1977 that is a simulation of the Battle of Dien Bien Phu that marked the end of the First Indochina War in 1954.

== Description ==
Citadel is a two-player game in which one player controls the forces of the French Foreign Legion holding the Dien Bien Phu citadel, and the other player controls the Viet Minh besiegers.

=== Components ===
The game box (or ziplock bag) contains:

- two-piece 44" x 28" hex grid map
- 480 die-cut counters
- Air chart
- Turn record
- Two combat results/terrain effects charts
- Scenario information chart
- Rule book

=== Gameplay ===
Each turn is 24 hours. The game comes with a series of chronologically linked scenarios that cover each phase of the battle. Although each separate scenario is only 5–7 turns, reviewer Brian Laidlaw noted that each one still takes 12–14 hours to complete. There is a complete Campaign game that covers the entire battle from start to finish in 55 turns.

Movement is unusual for wargames of the time: there is no limit to how far a unit may move except that every third hex, a moving unit may be subject to enemy fire, and the unit must stop if it comes up against an enemy unit's zone of control. Starting with the second scenario, the Viet Minh can entrench towards the French positions, thus avoiding movement in the open.

The French forces start the game with ten tanks, but these cannot be replaced if disabled, although they can be repaired. Likewise, only the French have airplanes, which can be used for artillery spotting, resupply or bombing raids. If the citadel's airstrip is destroyed or taken, then the French lose access to this resource.

The combat system is complex – some reviewers called it "overwrought" — and each separate combat die roll requires several calculations to achieve results.

=== Scenarios ===
Seven scenarios cover various aspects of the battle. An eighth campaign scenario covers the battle from start to finish.

=== Victory conditions ===
If the Viet Minh take objectives set out for them while keeping their losses within defined limits, then they win the scenario. Any other result is a French victory.

== Publication history ==
Citadel was designed by Frank Chadwick, with cover art by Rodger B. MacGowan, and was published by GDW in 1977 as both a ziplock bag edition, and as a boxed set.

== Reception ==
In Issue 31 of the British wargaming magazine Perfidious Albion, Hugh Baldwin felt that because the victory conditions for most of the seven scenarios required the capture of a few important strongpoints by the Viet Minh, the Viet Minh player tended to concentrate only on those while ignoring the rest of the battlefield, "which results in a slightly warped or lopsided battle." Baldwin also pointed out that in the shorter scenarios, there was little incentive for the French to attack Viet Minh supply lines, or to preserve air and ground units, since these were not part of the French victory conditions. Baldwin also pointed out that the rules allowed the Viet Minh unlimited use of 82 mm mortar fire, and felt that, overall, the game was unbalanced in favor of the Viet Minh. Baldwin concluded, "the game is extremely good in dealing with the tactical points and 'feel' of the battle of Dien Bien Phu but this is severely marred by the fundamental flaws in the victory conditions and the construction of the scenarios."

In Issue 29 of Phoenix, Brian Laidlaw liked the limitless movement system, which he thought forced the player on the defensive to decide when to fire at an advancing enemy. He agreed that the combat system was complex, but found it "satisfying to use, and the results 'feel' right." He concluded with a strong recommendation, saying, "It's not an easy game and perhaps when all is said and done the subject does not have wide appeal. But it is a game which rewards the thinker and the planner and, more importantly, once you've cracked the mechanics of the thing and got to grips with the action it's very exciting and darn good fun."

In Issue 77 of Campaign, Don Lowry called Citadel, "a very interesting, innovative and challenging tactical modern warfare game [...] That the combat system is innovative definitely follows from the complete lack of movement allowances in the game."

In Issue 33 of Moves, John Prados called the components "impressive". Looking at game strategy, Prados was equally as impressed, noting that for the Viet Minh player, this game "is not completely a matter of 'human wave' tactics. Some sophistication in tactical techniques is available to both players." Prados also found the morale rules that simulated the French increase in morale as their numbers were reduced were "a fine touch from designer Chadwick." He did, however, have some issues with replacement rules, saying that the casualty rate for the Viet Minh in the game is far higher than during the actual battle. Prados also noted historical issues with the number of artillery units for both sides. Prados concluded on a positive note, saying, "The excitement level is high due to the extremely interactive player-turns, and few notice the passage of time that it takes to run through complete game turns [...] Altogether a satisfying game for a francophile who wants to feel caught between Dien Bien Phu and the devil or for a prospective Viet Minh sympathizer who can see the light at the end of the entrenched camp."

In The Guide to Simulations/Games for Education and Training, Martin Campion warned that "This is an intricate and long game, but it is also a fascinating and convincing study of a crucial battle in contemporary history."

== Awards ==
At the 1978 Origins Awards, Citadel won two Game Designers Guild Awards: Best Movement System of 1977; and Best Combat System of 1977.

== Other reviews and commentary ==
- Campaign No. 79
- Grenadier No. 2
- Casus Belli (Issue 11 - Nov 1982)
