= Indian Ocean Adventure: The Japanese Raids on Ceylon =

1978 board game

Rulebook cover, 1978

Indian Ocean Adventure: The Japanese Raids on Ceylon is a board wargame published by Game Designers' Workshop (GDW) in 1978 that simulates the Indian Ocean raid by a Japanese aircraft carrier fleet during World War II.

== Description ==
In early April 1942, in a naval sortie now called the Indian Ocean raid, a strong Japanese carrier fleet under Admiral Chūichi Nagumo sortied into British-controlled waters around Sri Lanka (then Ceylon) to attack ports and shipping in an attempt to lure Admiral James Somerville's numerically inferior British Eastern Fleet into combat. Indian Ocean Adventure is a two-player board game that simulates the raid and the British commander's response. The game uses a set of rules developed for two previous carrier fleet wargames, Coral Sea: Turning the Japanese Advance and Battle for Midway, with some special rules added for night operations: the Japanese player is not allowed to operate flights at night, and while the British player can send airplanes out at night, they are limited to half their normal range.

Time scale is six hours per turn, four turns per day (morning, afternoon, evening, night). Map scale is 37.5 statute miles (33 nautical miles) per hex. Unit types include individual ships, groups of naval auxiliaries, half-squadrons (representing 8 aircraft) and smaller scouting elements (2-3 aircraft).

The game begins with the April 3 morning turn and ends on the evening turn of April 14 (43 turns maximum).

=== Components ===
The game, packaged in a resealable plastic bag, contains:

- 22" × 27 1/2" hex grid paper map
- 16-page rulebook
- 240 single-sided die-cut counters
- Ship status pad
- Two task-force composition charts
- Combat tables

== Publication history ==
GDW game designer Marc W. Miller created a set of wargame rules for World War II aircraft carrier actions in the 1974 game Coral Sea: Turning the Japanese Advance. He further expanded those rules in 1976's Battle for Midway: Decision in the Pacific. In 1978, Miller designed Indian Ocean Adventure: The Japanese Raids on Ceylon using the same set of rules, expanded to allow for the specific needs of this operation.

== Reception ==
In the January–February 1979 edition of the wargame magazine Fire & Movement (Issue #15), Mike Colleron had several problems with the historical accuracy of the rules. He pointed out that British aircraft carriers had armoured decks while Japanese carriers did not, yet in this game "the Indomitable and the Formidable have no such advantage over the Japanese carriers". Colleron also pointed out that some of the British Fairey Albacore torpedo bombers had historically been equipped with radar and could operate at full speed at night. While the game rules allow British air operations at night, these are limited to half speed, meaning that "morning was sure to find the British fleet within five hexes of the Japanese fleet, which just happens to be Kate [Japanese bomber] range". Colleron concluded the game was irreversibly unbalanced in favour of the Japanese player, saying, "You'll probably have trouble finding a British player for Indian Ocean Adventure."

In the November 1979 edition of Dragon (Issue #31), Mike Carr liked the use of rules from previous games, noting "The beauty of this is the easy transition a gamer can make, once he has mastered the system and has a basic grasp of the rules, for his knowledge will pave the way for a relatively quick assimilation of the other games in the series." However, Carr also found the game unbalanced, commenting that "Playing the British in this game is a real challenge, which is to say that this game is definitely weighted in favour of the Japanese chances." He also noted the game rules were not well-tested or edited, saying "they're simply not as clear as they should be and do not do an adequate job of explaining the rules." Carr also noted that an important rule about reconnaissance that was referenced on page 2 was missing from the rulebook, a fairly serious error "considering the importance of reconnaissance and search rules in a game of this sort." Overall, Carr concluded that if the player had access to the better-edited rules from GDW's Coral Sea, "The game is a good one, and certainly worthy of attention and recommendation (even if it's tough for one side to win) despite its glaring omission."

In Issue 18 of the Australian wargaming magazine Queensland Wargamer, Kevin Flynn commented, "Indian Ocean is fun to play but nerve-wracking for the British player as they await the Japanese raid on Ceylon. I would recommend it to anyone who is sick of playing games based on the Pacific War where the Americans are always the 'good guys'."
