= Suez '73 =

1981 board wargame

- Cover art by Rodger B. MacGowan
- Designers: Frank Chadwick
- Illustrators: Rodger B. MacGowan; Rich Banner
- Publishers: Game Designers' Workshop
- Publication: 1981
- Genres: Modern Middle East

Suez '73, subtitled "The Battle of Chinese Farm: October 15-19, 1973", is a board wargame published by Game Designers' Workshop in 1981 that simulates the Israeli crossing of the Suez Canal during the 1973 Yom Kippur War.

== Background ==
During the Arab-Israeli War of October 1973, Israeli forces opened a bridgehead over the Suez Canal to exploit a perceived gap in the Egyptian line, and instead ran up against a strong force. The battle took place in the vicinity of an Egyptian experimental farm that used Japanese equipment. Israeli observers mistook the Japanese Kanji characters on the machinery for Chinese Hanzi, leading to the misnomer "The Chinese Farm".

== Description ==
Suez '73 is a very complex board wargame for two players (or two teams) in which one side controls Israeli forces and the other side controls Arab forces.

=== Gameplay ===
The game system is based on the rules of White Death (also designed by Frank Chadwick and published by GDW in 1979), using a system of "impulses" within the turn. Each impulse has nine phases:

1. Movement Decision: The phasing (active) player has a certain number of Movement Points (MPs) for the entire game turn, and decides how many to expend in the impulse that is about to begin.
2. Artillery Barrage Decision: The phasing player decides on whether to use an artillery barrage and against which enemy units.
3. Movement: The phasing player uses the MPs committed in Step 1 to move units.
4. Defensive Opportunity Fire: The non-phasing player can take opportunity fire.
5. Artillery Barrage: The phasing player completes the artillery barrage decided on in Step 2.
6. Defensive fire: The non-phasing player fires.
7. Assault Decision: The phasing player must decide whether to press further or pull out.
8. Fire phase: All phasing units that have not yet fired may do so.
9. Withdrawal: Both sides can choose to withdraw.

The other player is given the opportunity to complete all of these steps. Play then returns to the first player, who starts at Step 1 again. This continues until both players have run out of MPs. This completes one game turn, which represents 12 hours of the battle.

The number of MPs per game turn varies from seven in the first turn to 10 for subsequent turns during the day, and five for turns at night.

=== Scenarios ===
Four short scenarios of 1–3 turns are included with the game:

- Advance to the Canal
- Arrival of the bridge
- Battle for Chinese Farm
- Israeli break-out

These can all be combined into a Campaign game.

== Publication history ==
In 1979, game designer Frank Chadwick created White Death, a World War II wargame that used a new and complex game system. Two years later, Chadwick created a second game using the same system, Suez '73. The game was published as a boxed set by GDW in 1981, with cover art by Rodger B. MacGowan and interior art by Rich Banner.

== Reception ==
In Issue 51 of the British wargaming magazine Perfidious Albion, Charles Vasey found the game overly long, writing, "the rules are well-written, the map and counters excellent, the research most impressive, and the results - well they look pretty good but I am no expert. Against this, the game is so long and dreary that it has become pretty unplayable." Vasey's biggest issue was with the impulse-based combat system, which he found long and cumbersome. Vasey concluded, "Suez '73 is like a Harley-Davidson MotorGlide, beautifully engineered but heavy and not that manoeuvreable, whereas Beda Fomm [GDW, 1979, also designed by Chadwick] is a 200cc Honda - excellent for both touring and town-work. If you can give the game the time it deserves you will do something worth your time ... Do not buy the game if you like three hour games however."

In Issue 27 of Fire & Movement, Bill Sanders liked the physical components, writing, "GDW produces some of the best components in wargaming." However, Sanders noted that this came at a cost: "The major plus and minus about the counters is the amount of information each contains. On the back of each counter are seven factors, and the front contains about as much information concerning the unit's identity, strength, and mobility. All this makes for a lot of squinting and set-up is a process of locating tiny identification numbers. During play, when you start adding markers for everything from strength point losses to disruption and illumination, things get cumbersome and messy — not to mention confusing!" Although Sanders was very familiar with the antecedent rules from White Death, he warned, "Let me advise players of White Death to go over the Suez rules very carefully before playing." Explaining the game's complexity, Sanders wrote, "the rules are not so much poorly written as they are complex ... it is a matter of GDW attempting as detailed as possible a representation of the nature of the conflict and simulating the numerous special units in the battle along with the features of the terrain, supply, and everything else unusual or unique." Sanders concluded, "Overall, I found Suez 73 to be the best game published in 1981, and the best I have seen in a long time. The mechanics are cumbersome and awkward, but all for the sake of increasing realism. The historical research is most impressive, considering how much mystery still shrouds the details of the battle. I would like to see clarification of the barrage rules and perhaps an 'introductory' scenario. Other than that, I cannot offer suggestions for improvement."

In the August 1981 issue of the Italian games magazine Pergioco, Ivo Fossati called this "is a battalion-level game characterized by a wide variety of units and the characteristic type of movement already adopted in the highly successful game White Death.

In Issue 25 of Warning Order, Matt Irsik called this a game "at the upper end of the complexity scale ... It is almost a tactical level game with operational level units and decisions, which does add to the complexity." Irsik concluded that Suez '73 did "a good job of portraying the desperate battles of the war, but will take an investment of time by the gamer."
