= 1940 (wargame) =

WWII board wargame

- Designers: Frank Chadwick
- Publishers: Game Designers' Workshop
- Publication: 1980; 45 years ago
- Genres: World War II

1940 is a board wargame published by Game Designers' Workshop (GDW) in 1980 that simulates Germany's 1940 invasion of France during World War II.

== Background ==
Although France and Germany had declared war in 1939, the two sides did not engage in conflict for the remainder of the year and the first four months of 1940, prompting newspapers to call it the "Phony War". Following the First World War, the French General Staff had ruled out the idea of a future German thrust through the Ardennes–Sedan sector, certain that such rough terrain with such a limited road network could not be crossed by tanks. They also believed Germany would respect the neutrality of Belgium and the Netherlands. For that reason, France was content to wait behind the heavily fortified Maginot Line that ran along the French-German border south of the Ardennes Forest, believing that German would be forced to advance through that sector. On 13 May 1940, Germany confounded French expectations by striking through Belgium and the Netherlands as well as through the weakly defended Ardennes, bypassing the Maginot Line. French forces reeled back from Germany's blitzkrieg tactics, trying without success to slow the German advance as it approached Sedan and the Meuse River.

== Description ==
1940 is a wargame for two players in which one controls the German forces, and the other controls the Allied forces. The game is one of the "Series 120" games produced by GDW — simple wargames with a small 17 in × 22 in (43 cm × 56 cm) hex grid map, only 120 counters or less, and designed to be played in less than 120 minutes. The game system uses a simple alternating "I Go, You Go" system, where one player moves and fires, followed by the other player. In addition, there are rules for morale that affect the firepower of units, special rules for the various types of soldiers, and leaders have an effect on combat.

The hex grid game map shows the heavily forested terrain of the Ardennes Forest as well as northern France, southern Netherlands, and Belgium. The game lasts ten turns.

=== Scenarios ===
Specific scenarios are not offered, but the German player must choose and complete at least one of three possible missions:

1. Take over the Maginot Line: No Allied unit can be on a Maginot Line hex at the end of the game.
2. Take Paris: All three hexes of Paris must be friendly territory for the German player at the end of the game.
3. Take over all ports and cities of Belgium: The German player must control all Belgian ports, all Belgian cities, and Lille at the end of the game. If the German player invaded Netherlands and does not force its surrender, then this mission fails.

=== Victory conditions ===
Both players receive various amounts of Victory Points (VPs) for eliminating enemy strength points. At the end of Turn 10, victory is determined as follows:

- Total Allied Victory: The Allied player has more VPs, has prevented the German player from fulfilling any of the three missions, and controls at least two Ruhr hexes.
- Decisive Allied Victory: The Allied player has as many or more VPs as the German player and has prevented the German player from fulfilling any of the three missions.
- Marginal Allied Victory: The Allied player has as many or more VPs as the German player OR has prevented the German player from fulfilling any of the three missions.
- Draw: The German player has completed their chosen mission and has more VPs than the Allied player.
- Marginal German Victory: The German player has completed their chosen mission, has more VPs than the Allied player AND has completed one of the two missions they did not choose.
- Decisive German victory: Same as Marginal German Victory, except the German player must have at least twice as many VPs as the Allied player. (This is the historical result.)
- Total German victory: Same as Decisive German Victory, but the German player must also achieve the third mission OR destroy at least 12 British strength points.

== Publication history ==
In the mid-1970s, large and complex board wargames such as Drang Nach Osten! and Terrible Swift Sword were very popular among experienced gamers, but were impossible to play in a single session, and were very difficult for new players to learn. In response, GDW created "Series 120", smaller and less complex games that used no more than 120 counters and would take less than 120 minutes to play. Three of these were 1940 (German invasion of France), 1941 (German invasion of the Soviet Union), and 1942 (Japanese invasion of Indonesia). 1940 was designed by Frank Chadwick, and published by GDW in 1980.

In 1988, the French game magazine Casus Belli featured a French translation of the game. In 2001, Kokusai-Tsushin Co. (国際通信社) published a Japanese-language version in Issue 38 of Command magazine.

== Reception ==
In Issue 46 of the British wargaming magazine Perfidious Albion, Charles Vasey commented "Clear rules, neat map, smart counters, plenty of historical work."

Issue 46 of the French games magazine Casus Belli noted, "Its author, Frank Chadwick, has achieved a remarkable feat: a simple, elegant, and accurate simulation with only 120 counters and a few pages of rules."

In Issue 7 of BattlePlan, James Meldrum liked the game, but noted "One of the greatest mysteries of World War Two is why the French and British did not attack Germany when they invaded Poland in 1939. Every military consideration favored a violent Anglo-French counteroffensive that could have struck deep into the heart of Germany and brought down Hitler's Third Reich in short order." Meldrum then suggested a variant of the game to explore this "what if?" scenario.

== Other reviews and commentary ==
- Campaign #100
- Fire & Movement #25 and #65
- Panzerfaust #54
- Strategy & Tactics # 27
