= Last Battle: Twilight 2000 =

Board game

- Cover art by A.C. Farley
- Designers: Tim Ryan
- Illustrators: A.C. Farley
- Publishers: Game Designers' Workshop
- Publication: 1989
- Genres: Science fiction

Last Battle: Twilight 2000 is a tactical board wargame published by Game Designers' Workshop (GDW) in 1989 that uses the post-apocalyptic European setting of the role-playing game Twilight 2000.

== Contents ==
Last Battle: Twilight 2000 is a tactical wargame in which post-nuclear holocaust warfare is simulated between small groups of surviving soldiers and armored vehicles. Nine scenarios are included that are designed to be played in order. The first, between two platoons of soldiers, uses a minimum of rules. Each successive scenario adds a few more rules such as advanced weapons, armor, transport, supplies and leadership. However, despite the additional rules, the game has been characterized as "easy to play."

The game contains a mix of small, medium and large counters, 6 geomorphic maps, vehicle cards and a rulebook. The rules for this game can replace the combat rules in the Twilight 2000 role-playing game.

== Publication history ==
In 1984, GDW published the post-apocalyptic survival role-playing game Twilight: 2000. Five years later, Tim Ryan developed a simple combat board wargame using the Twilight: 2000 setting titled Last Battle: Twilight:2000. It was published by GDW in 1989 as a boxed set with cover art by A.C. Farley.

== Reception ==
In Issue 7 of the British magazine Games International, Norman Smith stated that "This must be a welcome addition for Twilight 2000 enthusiasts and for those who are interested in man to man, tank to tank encounters of the modem era. Those who want a follow on from Team Yankee or Test of Arms may find Last Battle an acquired taste." Smith concluded by giving the game a rating of 3 out of 5.

In Issue 152 of Dragon (December 1989), Jim Bambra called this a game that "plays fast and gives a good feel for modern combat without recourse to complicated rules." Although Bambra found the production values high, he noted that the game "suffers from sloppy proofreading with various names being assigned to the same technical terms, not enough vehicle counters being provided for scenario three, and a few other muddy areas." Bambra commented that "the programmed-learning approach of the rules makes learning the game easy." Bambra thought that using these combat rules in a Twilight 200 role-playing session would speed up combat, but didn't think the rules for converting vehicles to Last Battle worked. Bambra concluded, "As a war game, this one is very good and I recommend it highly. How useful it will be in determining Twilight: 2000 combats is really a matter of personal taste. If you enjoy diving behind walls to avoid enemy fire and fumbling to change weapon clips, then Last Battle has limited usefulness. But if you want a quick way to lead lots of troops into action, then it may well be what you've been waiting for."

In the December 1989 issue of Games, Last Battle was chosen for inclusion in "The Year's Best Games". Editor Scott Marley called Last Battle "a fast-moving boardgame of soldier-to-soldier and tank warfare, circa World War Three. High-tech tanks rumble over devastated terrain in this easy-to-play game, a companion to Twilight: 2000, GDW's game of the coming apocalypse."
