= SSN =

SSN may refer to:

== Arts and entertainment ==
- Tom Clancy's SSN, a 1996 game by Clancy Interactive Entertainment describing the operations of a U.S. Navy attack submarine
- SSN (novel), a 1996 novel by Tom Clancy as a tie-in to the game
- SSN: Modern Tactical Submarine Warfare, a 1975 board wargame

== Organisations ==
=== Broadcasting ===
- Setanta Sports News, a former 24-hour sports news network in the UK
- Sky Sports News, a 24-hour sports news network in the UK
- Soul of the South Network, an African-American oriented television network

=== Education ===
- Scholars Strategy Network, an association of academics and researchers
- Scoil an Spioraid Naoimh, a primary school in Cork City Ireland
- SSN College of Engineering, an engineering institution located in the suburbs of Chennai, Tamil Nadu, India

=== Government ===
- Servicio Sismológico Nacional, the Mexican National Seismological Service, UNAM, Mexico
- Servizio Sanitario Nazionale, Italy's national health service
- Social Security number, an identification number used by the U.S. Social Security Administration
- Superintendency of Insurance (Argentina) (Superintendencia de Seguros de la Nación), of Argentina overseeing insurance companies

=== Other ===
- The Seed Savers' Network, an international not-for-profit seed-saving organisation founded in Australia
- Società Storica Novarese (Novara Historical Society), an association for historical studies founded in Novara, Italy
- Société suisse de numismatique, a Swiss numismatic organization
- Space Surveillance Network, a US program to monitor space activity
- Species Survival Network, a coalition of conservation organizations
- Suncorp Super Netball, the sponsored name of the Australian Super Netball professional league

== Science and technology ==
- Secure Service Network, a type of network behind a firewall or IPS
- Semantic Sensor Network, an ontology in the Semantic Sensor Web
- SIM Serial Number, used to identify a mobile phone's SIM card
- Subsystem number, used in the Signaling Connection and Control Part of Signaling System #7 routing
- Surgical segment navigator, a system for computer-assisted surgery
- Superior salivatory nucleus, a cranial nerve nucleus

== Other uses ==
- South Sudan, a country
- Seoul Air Base (IATA code: SSN), South Korea
- SSN (hull classification symbol), the US Navy's symbol for a nuclear powered fast attack submarine
- Stoom Stichting Nederland, a Dutch Railway Museum

== See also ==
- SN (disambiguation)
- SS (disambiguation)
