= 1974 Origins Award winners =

The following are the winners of the 1st annual (1974) Origins Award, presented at Origins Game Fair 1975:

The awards were the "brainchild of Canadian hobbyist John Mansfield." Originally the awards were the Origins Awards but were informally known as the Charles Roberts Awards and it was only in 1988 that Charles Roberts officially agreed to let his name be used.

== Charles Roberts Awards ==
Category	Winner	Company	Designer(s)
Best Professional Game	Third Reich	The Avalon Hill Game Company	Don Greenwood, John Prados
Best Amateur Game	Manassas	Historical Simulations	Tom Eller
Best Professional Magazine	Strategy & Tactics	SPI	
Best Amateur Magazine	Albion		Don Turnbull

== Adventure Gaming Hall of Fame Inductee ==
- Don Turnbull
