= 1942 (board game) =

Board game

- Designers: Marc W. Miller
- Publishers: Game Designers Workshop
- Publication: 1978
- Genres: WWII

1942 is a board wargame published by Game Designers Workshop (GDW) in 1978 that is a strategic simulation of Japan's invasion of the Philippines, Indonesia, and Indochina in 1942.

== Description ==
1942 is a two-player "Series 120" game, part of a series of GDW microgames that had only 120 counters and could be played in 120 minutes. The game covers December 1941–May 1942, when Japan rapidly struck out on multiple fronts against Dutch, British, Australian and American holdings in the Pacific theatre. Faced with a powerful Japanese offensive, the Allied player must play a defensive game and try to prevent the Japanese player from gaining the geographical objectives it needs to win the game.

=== Components ===
The game box (or ziplock bag) contains:

- 17 in × 22 in (43 cm × 56 cm) paper hex grid map scaled at 85 nautical miles (158 km) per hex
- 16-page rulebook
- 120 counters
- errata sheet

=== Gameplay ===
The turn sequence uses the traditional "IGOUGO" (I go, You go) structure except for a special start to the game, when the Japanese player is given a "surprise" turn representing actions taken in December 1941. Thereafter, the game lasts 10 turns, representing the first five months of 1942. Each turn has four phases:

1. Allied movement
2. Allied Combat
3. Japanese Movement
4. Japanese Combat

=== Victory conditions ===
The Japanese player earns 2 Victory Points for each surrendered Allied unit, 20 Victory Points for each Allied fortification taken, and 5 Victory Points for taking Hong Kong. The Allied player earns a Victory Point for each surviving Allied unit, and 2 Victory Points for each surrendered Japanese unit. Allied points are subtracted from Japanese points. If the result is greater than 40, the Japanese player wins, and if 20 or less, is an Allied victory. Anything in between is a draw.

== Publication history ==
1942 was designed by Marc W. Miller, and was published by GDW in as a boxed set in 1978. GDW reissued the game in a ziplock bag in 1980.

Command Japan magazine published a Japanese version of the game in Issue 57 (July–August 2004) with artwork by Sawshun Yamaguchi.

== Reception ==
In Issue 30 of Phoenix, Steve Hackett was very disappointed in this game, which he felt had probably been originally conceived as a larger game that had been "savaged and trimmed to fit the 'Series 120' format." He noted that despite the theme of Japanese amphibious landings, there are no naval units or transports in the game, only a Naval Movement rule. He likewise felt there were problems with rules for supply, zone of control, and victory conditions. He concluded "Quite simply — not recommended."

Ray Garbee, writing a retrospective review of 1942 more than 40 years after its publication for Armchair General, thought the old game "mostly captures the feel of the period. The Japanese start with a powerful army that is likely to drive back their opponents. [...] Conversely, the Allied player is on the back foot. At best they can mount a powerful defense designed to slow the Japanese advance." But Garbee felt that the game "does not really capture the Japanese ability to move faster than their opponents as seen in both Malaya and the Philippines." He also noted that "the quantity of special rules feels cumbersome." In conclusion Garbee gave the game a score of 88%, saying, "It’s a good introductory game covering an under-represented campaign. In addition, it can be a reasonable solitaire game. Also, it has a high nostalgia factor for the veteran gamers of the late 1970’s and 1980’s. But be aware that the game mechanics are a bit dated."

== Other reviews and commentary ==
- Campaign #90
- Fire & Movement #68
- Grenadier #9
- Strategy & Tactics #29 & #65
- Casus Belli (Issue 15 - Jun 1983)
- Games & Puzzles #75
