= Pharsalus: The Clash of Legions, August 9, 48 B.C. =

Board wargame

Cover of the rulebook

Pharsalus: The Clash of Legions, August 9, 48 B.C. is a board wargame published by Game Designers' Workshop (GDW) in 1977 that simulates the Battle of Pharsalus, which decided who would rule the Roman Empire, Pompey or Julius Caesar.

== Background ==
Following the start of Caesar's Civil War in 49 BCE, Julius Caesar had captured Rome, forced Pompey and his allies to withdraw from Italy, and defeated Pompey's legates in Spain. The following year, Caesar was defeated at Dyrrachium, Greece and withdrew east into Thessaly. Pompey pursued, under pressure from his overconfident allies who accused him of prolonging the war to extend his command. The two armies met near the town of Pharsalus on 9 August 48 BCE.

== Description ==
Pharsalus is a two-player board wargame where one player controls the legions of Caesar and the forces of his allies, and the other the Roman Republican legions of Pompey. With a 22" x 28" hex grid map, and 480 counters, the game's complexity has been characterized as "somewhat more unusual than others — a step above the straight SPI PRESTAGS system."

Some of those complexities include:

- Units have specific facing (front, back and flanks), which vary according to the weapon they wield.
- Fatigue, which is brought on by running, fighting, and receiving missile fire, plays an important factor.
- A unit's efficiency is reflected in its combat power.
- Players are limited in the number of units they can stack on one space by a total strength allowance

== Publication history ==
Pharsalus was designed by Loren K. Wiseman and John Harshman, and published by GDW in 1977 as a ziplock bag game.

== Reception ==
In the 1980 book The Complete Book of Wargames, game designer Jon Freeman commented that "the somewhat interwoven sequence of play reflects a greater tactical orientation than is typical of battle games of this period." Although he felt that the game's tactical complexity was a step above average, he noted that "Nonetheless, the dull, almost nonexistent terrain serves to define the battlefield rather than decorate or influence it, and like all ancient battles, the affair is limited in maneuver and heavy on shock." Freeman concluded by giving the game an Overall Evaluation of "Good", saying, "Within these limitations, Pharsalus does quite well: you even get the feel of moving individual legions, withdrawing tired troops, and gearing up for the big charge, as opposed to just pushing counters around. A nice effort."

In The Guide to Simulations/Games for Education and Training, Martin Campion thought "the game has a good tactical flavor, although it does not reflect leadership as a tactical consideration." However, Campion concluded, "Pharsalus is not the best battle to turn into a tactical game because the enemy armies are do much alike it tends to get dull."

== Reviews ==
- Phoenix #11
