= Battle of Prague =

Battle of Prague may refer to:

- Battle of Prague (1179), a battle between Soběslav II and Frederick of Bohemia
- Battle of White Mountain (1620), an early battle in the Thirty Years' War
- Battle of Prague (1648), the last action of the Thirty Years' War
- Siege of Prague (1742), a siege during the War of the Austrian Succession
- Battle of Prague (1757), a battle in which the Prussians defeated the Austrians in the Seven Years' War
  - Siege of Prague, which directly followed the 1757 battle
  - The Battle of Prague, a composition by Frantisek Kotzwara based on the 1757 battle
- Prague Offensive (1945), the last major Soviet operation of World War II in Europe

== See also ==
- Siege of Prague (disambiguation)
- The Battle of Prague, board game released in 1980
