= Asteroid (disambiguation) =

An asteroid is a minor planet.

Asteroid or Asteroids may also refer to:

== Astrophysics ==
- Asteroid belt
- Asteroid moon

== Art, entertainment, and media ==
=== Films ===
- Asteroid (film), a 1997 TV movie

=== Games ===
- Asteroid (board game), published by Game Designers' Workshop, 1980
- Asteroids (video game), 1979 arcade game

=== Music ===
- Asteroid 1976, a 2008 album by Taiwanese rock band 1976
- Asteroid (Pearl & Dean theme), a piece of music used to introduce cinema advertising reels distributed by Pearl & Dean
- "Asteroid", a song by Killing Joke from the album Killing Joke
- "Asteroid", a song by Kyuss from the album Welcome to Sky Valley
- "Asteroid", a song by Pentagon from the album Universe: The Black Hall

== Biology ==
- Starfish, echinoderms in the class Asteroidea
- Asteroideae, the subfamily of flowering plants
- Asterids, a clade of flowering plants

== Other uses ==
- Asteroids in astrology
- Asteroid (horse), a racehorse
- Asteroid body
- Astroid, a mathematical curve
