= SSN: Modern Tactical Submarine Warfare =

Naval board wargame

SSN: Modern Tactical Submarine Warfare is a board wargame published by Game Designers' Workshop (GDW) in 1975 that simulates submarine warfare in the 1970s.

== Description ==
"SSN" is the US Navy designation for a nuclear-powered general-purpose attack submarine. SSN is a game about submarine warfare, simulating technology and tactics that were cutting edge in 1975. The game is played on a large featureless hex grid map that represents the ocean, using a scale of 1,000 yards (910 m) per hex. The game uses a system of simultaneous movement for surface vessels. Until detected, submarines make their movement off the map, effectively making them invisible. Detecting a submarine is a combination of the level of technology available on the ship trying to detect it, and the noise that the submarine makes.

=== Scenarios ===
The game comes with 15 scenarios. Three are peacetime scenarios and simulate the "cat and mouse" electronic tag strategies used by Soviet and American vessels during the Cold War. The remaining 12 scenarios are wartime scenarios that usually pit one submarine against 4 to 12 surface vessels. Some of the wartime scenarios are submarine versus submarine engagements.

== Publication history ==
SSN was designed by Stephen Newberg and Marc W. Miller and published as a ziplock bag game by GDW in 1975.

== Reception ==
In a 1976 poll conducted by Simulations Publications to determine the most popular board wargames in North American, SSN placed 65th out of 214 games.

In the 1977 book The Comprehensive Guide to Board Wargaming, Nicholas Palmer noted that the map was "understandably" featureless, and mentioned the "wide range of scenarios and forces".

In The Guide to Simulations/Games for Education and Training, Martin Campion commented "The movement and combat systems are not difficult but they succeed in portraying the most important elements of contemporary naval warfare if it were to occur.
