= White Death (board game) =

1979 WWII board wargame published by Game Designers Workshop

Cover art by Rodger B. MacGowan

White Death, subtitled "Velikiye Luki, The Stalingrad of the North", is a board wargame published by Game Designers Workshop (GDW) in 1979 that is a strategic simulation of the Battle of Velikiye Luki during World War II.

== Background ==
The German summer offensive of 1942 had forced the Soviets back along a broad front. In the fall of 1942, the Soviets sprung a massive counterattack. One part of that offensive was an encirclement of the German-held city of Velikiye Luki by the Third Shock Army under General Maksim Purkayev. The Germans responded by trying to break the siege to rescue the defenders.

== Description ==
White Death is a two-player wargame where one player controls the Soviet forces besieging Velikiye Luki, and the other player controls the German defenders and relief columns.

=== Components ===
The original GDW edition game box contains:

- 22" x 28" paper hex grid map scaled at 1 mi (1.6 km) per hex
- rulebook
- 480 double-sided die-cut counters
- various player aids
- 6-sided die

The version published by Command Japan has 550 counters and does not include a die.

=== Gameplay ===
Each game turn represents five days and is divided into first a Soviet turn and then a German turn. Both players start each turn with ten movement points. Each turn is broken down into "impulses", which are further subdivided into five phases:

- Movement Phase
- Barrage Phase
- Defensive Fire Phase
- Assault Phase
- Terminal Phase

During each impulse, the active player can choose "action" or "pass". If choosing "pass", the player can only attack with barrage, and can only move by railway but must spend 1 movement point. If "action" is chosen, then the player spends between 1 and 10 movement points, from his 10 MP limit per turn, to move one or more units, and then can use both barrage fire and assault. The other player then becomes the active player. The players alternate spending movement points and conducting impulses until all ten movement points have been used by both players.

=== Scenarios ===
The game has six scenarios:

- "Purkayev’s Attack" (4 turns)
- "Woehler’s Response" (3 turns)
- "First Relief Attempt"(2 turns)
- "Second Relief Attempt" 2 turns)
- "Final Relief Attempt" (2 turns)
- "Velikiye Luki Campaign": A compilation of all five of the shorter scenarios in a 13-turn game

=== Victory conditions ===
The victory conditions for each scenario are based on enemy units destroyed, as well as reaching geographical objectives.

== Publication history ==
Historian Shelby Stanton researched the Battle of Velikiye Luki and passed that on to friend and game designer Frank Chadwick, who turned Stanton's research into the wargame White Death, published by GDW in as a boxed set in 1979 with cover art by Rodger B. MacGowan.

A video game version of White Death was published for Amiga in 1989 and MS-DOS in 1990.

Command Japan magazine (シミュレーションゲーム コマンドマガジン) published a Japanese-language pull-out version of the game (ホワイト・デス) in Issue 96 (January–February 2011).

== Reception ==
In Issue 47 of the British wargaming magazine Perfidious Albion, Charles Vasey commented, "GDW's White Death may not be a modern classic, but it could well be a major advance in wargame design ... because of the extent to which it shows that it is possible to mix historical accuracy with playability, if you take the necessary care in design rather than merely re-hashing an existing system." Vasey was impressed by the game's historical accuracy, writing, "White Death oozes historicity, from the almost complete unit designations (those that are unknown are honestly marked '?') to the German and Russian (Cyrillic) place names side by side on the map, just as they would have appeared on the actual operations maps of the time ... the game earns excellent points for historical accuracy." Vasey concluded, "The game IS a game, it is playable and fun, and yet it IS historical, or at least it feels like it is."

In Issue 26 of Phoenix, Geoff Barnard called White Death "a superb example of a historically accurate wargame in which it is clear, almost from the very moment that you open the package, that the historicty of the simulation was one of the prime considerations." Barnard liked the "clean system" of rules that resulted in a "cleanly flowing game." He concluded with a strong recommendation, saying, "White Death is a game of small actions and much manoeuvre and even when the fronts do form later in the game it flows."

== Other reviews and commentary ==
- Fire & Movement No. 21
- Paper Wars No. 6
- Casus Belli (Issue 14 - Apr 1983)
