= Rommel: Battles for Tobruk =

1985 video game

- Publisher(s): Game Designers' Workshop
- Engine: Atari 8-bit
- Release: 1985
- Genre(s): Strategy

Rommel: Battles for Tobruk is a computer wargame for Atari 8-bit computers published by Game Designers' Workshop in 1985.

== Gameplay ==
Rommel: Battles for Tobruk is a game in which the four major World War II battles for the city of Tobruk (Operation Brevity, Operation Battleaxe, Operation Crusader and the Battle of Gazala) are simulated.

== Reception ==
M. Evan Brooks reviewed the game for Computer Gaming World, and stated that "Overall, Rommel is an extremely detailed simulation. But the detail clutters playability to an unconscionable degree so that Rommel becomes an exercise in frustration."
