= The Battle of Prague =

The Battle of Prague is a 1980 board game published by Game Designers' Workshop.

== Gameplay ==
The Battle of Prague is a game in which Fredrick the Great's armies are depicted in 1757 during the Seven Years' War.

== Reviews ==
- Casus Belli
- Phoenix
