= Operation Crusader (board game) =

1978 WWII board wargame

- Cover art by Rodger B. MacGowan
- Designers: Frank Chadwick
- Illustrators: Rodger B. MacGowan
- Publishers: Game Designers' Workshop
- Publication: 1978
- Genres: WWII Combat

Operation Crtusader is a board wargame published by Game Designers' Workshop in 1978 that simulates combat in and around Tobruk during the North African Campaign of World War II.

== Background ==
In early 1941, the German Afrika Korps under the command of General Erwin Rommel laid siege to Tobruk, needing it as a supply port in order to continue fighting in North Africa. From May 1941 to November 1941, the British launched three attempts to lift the siege, code-named Operation Brevity, Operation Battleaxe, and Operation Crusader.

== Description ==
With almost 1,500 counters, Operation Crusader is a "monster" board wargame (a wargame with more than 1,000 counters) for 2 players or, more likely, 2 teams. As critic Friederich Helfferich pointed out, "The game can be played by two but is at its best in team play with limited communications and intelligence under an imaginative umpire." There are five unmounted hex grid maps scaled at 1.5 miles (2.4 km) per hex that cover the North African desert from east of Sidi Barani to west of Tobruk. The counters for individual units are not placed on the board; rather, they are gathered into "columns', and one marker is placed on the board to represent that battle group. Each turn represents one hour of game time, and the "Operation Crusader" scenario lasts twenty turns.

=== Movement ===
The game uses "simove" (simultaneous movement), where both players or teams reveal their movements simultaneously. Rather than having to write down the route of each column, hex by hex, for every turn, each player simply writes down the compass direction in which each column will move, or the road it will move along. If the former, the unit moves in a straight line to the limit of its movement allowance; if the latter, the unit follows the road to the limit of its movement allowance.

Moving columns must take on one of three formations: Bounding, Travelling or Road. If a column does not move, it must be either Stationary or Laagered.

=== Supply ===
Supply points, divided into food, ammunition and gas, must be brought onto the board and transported to headquarter units. Units must go to the headquarter unit to get supplied. Units with no food points take damage. Lack of ammunition points means they can neither attack nor defend. No gas points leaves the unit stationary. Designer Frank Chadwick deliberately chose supply as an important design parameter, saying, "When I began work on the Crusader project, I was aware that supply would have to play a important part in the game system. Why this was and the extent to which it was important, I perceived only dimly..."

=== Leaders ===
Leader counters have an effect on the units that they command, and are rated for morale bonus, capture evasion, and escape ability.

=== Scenarios ===
Three scenarios are included with the game:

- Operation Crusader: The main scenario that requires all the maps and counters.
- Operation Brevity: A much smaller scenario requiring fewer maps and counters.
- Operation Battleaxe: A mini-game requiring only one map and a few dozen counters.

== Publication history ==
Operation Crusader was designed by Frank Chadwick, and was published by GDW in 1978 as a boxed set with cover and interior art by Rodger B. MacGowan.

Frank Chadwick recreated Operation Crusader as a "double-blind" game that used two sets of maps, one for each player. The game, retitled 8th Army: Operation Crusader – The Winter Battles for Tobruk, 1941, was released by GDW in 1984.This version was translated into Japanese and published in Command Magazine Japan #53 (November–December 2003).

== Reception ==
In Issue 33 of the British wargaming magazine Perfidious Albion, Charles Vasey and Geoffrey Barnard discussed the game. Vasey commented, "Operation Crusader make me wonder if GDW have really done the right thing with this game. The five-map, multi-player, air game simulation of [the "Operation Crusader" scenario] requires far more time and people than are common in the hobby. It's not that you couldn't play it all with two players — it's simply that you could not really keep track of what was going on in a thousand small combats. 'Battleaxe' is smaller but still best for a team; and 'Brevity' is an excellent mini-game." Barnard commented, "It is very much a monster game, covering a complex operation in immense detail. I suppose that like any other masterpiece, it does help if you understand it, and you really cannot expect to understand Operation Crusader on the first playing." Vasey concluded, "Once mastered, the system is beautifully flowing and quick ... All I can say is buy this game and play it." Barnard concluded, "In spite of the mass of details in the game, it does work, though there are odd things that I'm not happy with."

In Craft, Model, and Hobby Industry Magazine, Rick Mataka noted, "All rules are well written with many examples of play provided. [A] large game that is highly detailed, it accurately simulates the problems encountered with desert warfare." Mataka concluded, "Operation Crusader could be recommended for those with [an] intermediate background in boardgaming."

In the 1980 book The Best of Board Wargaming, Friederich Helfferich called the simultaneous movement rules "revolutionary" and the physical components "outstanding." Helfferich also noted that the rules, although ground-breaking, were "remarkably free of errors and failings, except perhaps that artillery in certain situations can become too powerful." Helfferich concluded by giving the game an Excitement grade of 85%. Marcus Watney agreed with this grade, commenting, "A quite remarkable game, breaking new ground in its handling of desert warfare." Watney added, "The main Operation Crusader scenario is too large for two players, but is very exciting when played in teams, with one player per division. ... I recommend this game for [wargame] club play."

== Awards ==
At the 1978 Charles S. Roberts Awards, Operation Crusader was a finalist in two categories:

- "Best Twentieth Century Game"
- "Best Graphics and Physical Systems"
