= Manassas (wargame) =

- Rulebook cover of GDW edition, 1976
- Designers: Tom Eller
- Illustrators: Rodger B. MacGowan
- Publishers: Historical Concepts, Game Designers' Workshop
- Publication: 1973, 1976
- Genres: Board wargame

Manassas is a board wargame originally published by Historical Concepts in 1974, and republished by Game Designers Workshop (GDW) in 1976 that simulates the First Battle of Bull Run during the American Civil War.

== Background ==
In the first major battle of the American Civil War, poorly trained Union forces under Brigadier General Irvin McDowell marched south from Washington, attempting to attack the Confederate capital of Richmond. They were intercepted by the equally inexperienced Confederate Army under Brigadier General P.G.T. Beauregard. What started as a strong Union position quickly deteriorated as Confederate reinforcements arrived by train, and the result was a Confederate victory as Union forces beat a hasty and disorganized withdrawal to Washington.

== Description ==
Manassas is a two-player brigade/regiment-level wargame in which one player controls Unions forces, and the other the Confederate forces.

=== Components ===
The game box contains:

- paper hex grid map scaled at 0.6 mi (1 km) per hex
- 240 die-cut counters
- rulebook
- player aid with charts
- organization card

=== Gameplay ===
Unlike many wargames that use a "I go, You go" alternating turn system, Manassas uses simultaneous movement. Units damaged in combat are reduced in strength via a number of steps, with another marker showing the unit's current strength. Various rules allow for night disengagement, weather, supply and military formations.

== Publication history ==
Manassas was designed by amateur game designer Tom Eller, who subsequently founded Historical Concepts in order to publish the game in 1974. The game was purchased by GDW in 1976, who published it the following year with cover art by Rodger B. MacGowan.

== Reception ==
Richard Berg reviewed Manassas in Opening Moves, saying "A minor gem from an 'amateur' designer. A SiMove [simultaneous movement] system that concentrates on formation and operational-level tactics. A tense contest of wits backed by solid historical research."

In his 1977 book The Comprehensive Guide to Board Wargaming, Nicholas Palmer noted that the first edition of this game had been praised despite being an amateur production. He called the system of using a marker to denote unit strength "slightly odd", and warned that due to its complexity, this was "Not for beginners."

In The Guide to Simulations/Games for Education and Training, Martin Campion noted the game could be used as an educational aid, commenting "This game could be used as the basis of an apprpriately confusing multiplayer game in which the McDowell and Beauregard players would write to their subcommanders, while the latter would prepare separate written orders for their own units."

== Awards ==
At the 1975 Origins Awards, Manassas won the very first Charles S. Roberts Award for Best Amateur Game of 1974.

== Other reviews and commentary ==
- Fire & Movement #41
- Fire & Movement #84
