= The Great Patriotic War: Nazi Germany vs. the Soviet Union =

Board game

The Great Patriotic War: Nazi Germany vs. the Soviet Union is a board game published by Game Designers' Workshop (GDW) in 1988 that simulates conflict between Germany and the Soviet Union in World War II.

== Description ==
The Great Patriotic War is a two-player game in which the war on the Russian front during World War II is simulated either as a single campaign game, or as a series of smaller scenarios.

=== Components ===
The game box contains:

- 22" x 33" hex grid map scaled at 40 mi (65 km) per hex
- 24-page rulebook
- 16-page scenario booklet
- 240 die-cut counters
- A copy of Battle for Moscow, a smaller game on which The Great Patriotic War is based

== Scenarios ==
In addition to a short introductory scenario meant to teach the basic rules, the game includes five historical scenarios:

1. Operation Barbarossa
2. Fall Blau
3. Kursk
4. Stalingrad
5. Operation Bagration

These five can be combined into a campaign game.

=== Gameplay ===
First the Germans, and then the Soviets, follow this sequence each turn:

1. Reinforcements/Replacements
2. Special movement: During their respective turns, the Germans can move their tanks, and the Soviets can move by train
3. Combat
4. General movement

=== Victory conditions ===
In each scenario, occupation of certain cities defines who will win.

== Publication history ==
In 1986, GDW published Battle for Moscow, a small game (39 counters, 7 turns) simulating Operation Typhoon that was designed by Frank Chadwick to introduce new players to the hobby of wargaming. It was a success, and at the Origins Awards in 1987, it was a finalist for the Charles S. Roberts Award for "Best World War II Board Game of 1986."

Using the same rules system with the addition of more advanced options, Chadwick expanded the game to cover the entire German-Soviet conflict, and released it as The Great Patriotic War in 1988.

== Reception ==
In Issue 2 of Games International, Norman Smith liked the components, and found the turn sequence "beautifully models warfare at the Corps and Army level of this period." He concluded by giving it an above average rating of 4 out of 5, saying, "Overall, the game is good value for money, an excellent choice for beginners and a solid game for the collections of regular gamers."

In Fire & Movement #68, John K. Setear noted that The Great Patriotic War lacks a fog of war mechanism in its design, making any simulation of battle inaccurate, since both players can clearly see the disposition of their opponent's forces.

== See also ==
- Moscow '41
