= White Death (video game) =

1989 video game

- Developer: Command Simulations
- Platforms: Amiga, MS-DOS
- Release: 1989: Amiga; 1990: MS-DOS
- Genre: Strategy

White Death is a turn-based strategy video game published in 1989 for the Amiga by Command Simulations. An MS-DOS version was released in 1990.

== Gameplay ==
White Death is a computer game adaption of Frank Chadwick's White Death board game, covering the Battle of Velikiye Luki during World War 2.

== Reception ==
Wyatt Lee reviewed the game for Computer Gaming World, and stated that "For those who desire the detail of a boardgame where the computer both performs the bookkeeping functions and provides a built-in opponent, White Death is an extremely viable choice."
