= The Battle of Chickamauga (video game) =

1985 video game

- Publisher(s): Game Designers' Workshop
- Platform(s): Atari 8-bit
- Release: 1985
- Genre(s): Turn-based strategy

The Battle of Chickamauga is a computer wargame published by Game Designers' Workshop in 1985.

== Gameplay ==
The Battle of Chickamauga is a game in which the Battle of Chickamauga from the American Civil War is recreated.

== Reception ==
Mark Bausman reviewed the game for Computer Gaming World, and stated that "The turn resolution is very quick but still gives a nice "feel" for what happened. Overall, I feel that GDW has a good first entry to the world of computer gaming."
