= Troubled Waters (Harpoon) =

1991 game supplement for the game Harpoon

Troubled Waters is a 1991 game supplement for the board game Harpoon published by Game Designers' Workshop.

== Contents ==
Troubled Waters is a supplement in which combat in the Middle East between 1971 and 1991 is covered.

== Reception ==
Allen Mixson reviewed Troubled Waters in White Wolf #33 (Sept./Oct., 1992), rating it a 4 out of 5 and stated that "Troubled Waters focuses on the smaller battles fought on the tactical level near the coasts. While not as grand as a fleet-to-fleet slug-out, it brings naval tactics up close and personal."
