= Red Empire (game) =

1990 card game

Red Empire is a card game published by Game Designers' Workshop in 1990.

== Gameplay ==
Red Empire is a fast-paced political card game for 3 to 6 players in which each participant assumes the role of a high-ranking Soviet official leading a faction within the Party, military, or KGB. The objective is to navigate a volatile environment of power struggles, crises, and purges to accrue the most victory points by game's end—whether or not the winner ever becomes president. Gameplay begins with an open contest for the presidency. Once in power, a player gains resilience through high Stature, making them harder to purge. But crises—drawn as headline-driven cards—can quickly threaten the regime, forcing immediate resolution or resulting in the President's removal. Mandate Cards drive obligatory actions each turn, while Option and Action Cards enable bold maneuvers like staging purges, avoiding them (say, with a trip to Paris), or undermining rivals. Diplomacy involving temporary alliances can devolve into betrayal. New leaders may be drawn for tactical flexibility or expendable roles in internal purges. A game-changing Hero of the Soviet Union card can shield the President from threats and boost their standing permanently. Despite its layered strategy, the game plays swiftly—rounds with five players typically wrap in under 30 minutes.

== Reception ==
Allen Mixson reviewed Red Empire in White Wolf #25 (Feb./March, 1991), rating it a 4 out of 5 and stated that "The game is fast-paced fun and ends all too soon. […] With five people, the average game played was less than 30 minutes. This makes for an excellent, flexible game. The game can be easily understood and played by just about anyone from the age of 8 and up, so the whole family can play. I highly recommend Red Empire. Keep laughing and deal, comrade!"

== Reviews ==
- Casus Belli #59
- Dragon #162
- Fire & Movement #70
