= Double Star (board game) =

Science fiction board wargame

Interplanetary War as Worlds Collide
- Box cover by Steve Leialoha
- Designers: Marc Miller
- Publishers: Game Designers' Workshop
- Publication: 1979; 47 years ago
- Genres: Science fiction board wargame

Double Star is a 1979 science fiction board wargame, designed by Marc Miller, and published by Game Designers' Workshop that simulates interplanetary warfare in a double-star solar system.

== Game play ==
Double Star is a two-player game about space warfare, and operates on the belief that warfare between two star systems is possible but expensive and difficult.

This game is based in a binary star system, where the two stars orbit each other, and each star has a different human colony orbiting it; one is of Chinese descent, the other Arab. Each colony has both antipathy for the other colony and a need for something the other colony has, and so war begins. The board features both worlds as they orbit their respective stars, and both stars orbiting each other. These complex orbital movements must be taken into account when sending ships or trying to steer an asteroid into colliding with the opposing planet.

=== Movement ===
The game uses a simple alternating "I Go, You Go" system of turns. Each unit on the board can use its movement points to either move one hex per point, or can make one 60-degree change of direction per point.

=== Combat ===
Each player forms their spaceships into task forces, which can form into one of several tactical formations: cone, wedge, cylinder and globe. Each formation has its advantages in combat. Players can also "fling" asteroids at the enemy planet, which acts as a kinetic bomb upon impact.

=== Strategy ===
Strategic planning is key to the game, and players must purchase ships, defense units, power plants, and then allocate limited resources for training or combat. Since it takes several turns to move ships from one system to the other, offensives must be carefully planned in advance.

=== Scenarios ===
Several scenarios are offered, resulting in games that can last anywhere from a few hours to several gaming sessions.

== Reception ==
In Issue 45 of the British wargaming magazine Perfidious Albion, Charles Vasey and Geoffrey Barnard discussed the game. Vasey commented, "This is a rather simple game with a great deal of Imperium complexity removed, which I regret ... The combat rules are quite cunning." Barnard replied, "There are certainly some interesting ideas in Double Star from the point of view of game mechanics, [but] I'm not too sure if it is a 'game'." Vasey concluded, "Despite being simpler than Imperium, the slower movement makes it quite a long game. Given this length of time, I wonder if more complexity could not have been incorporated?"

In the March 1980 issue of Ares magazine, David Ritchie liked the game enough to award it 7 out of 9. "All in all, this is a honey that chooses to entertain by doing a few things and doing them well. Playable, rather than definitive, you might say. Moderately complex. May be played in an afternoon."

In the March 1980 edition of Dragon (Issue 35), William Fawcett enjoyed the ability to choose tactical formations for space fleets, and liked the rules, which he found to be simple enough to digest in 30 minutes. "There appear to be no serious ambiguities or omissions, although your first few spaceship-to-spaceship combats may drag a little until you become familiar with the formation system." Fawcett recommended the game, saying, "Double Star is one of the most solid science-fiction games this reviewer has played. It holds together well and includes all of the major strategic considerations that can be expected in warfare of this type. It can take a considerable period of time to play... but involves enough combat and other decision-making situations to keep interest high."

In the August 1980 edition of The Space Gamer (Issue 30), Robert G. F. Marrinan gave it a favorable review, saying, "This is one of the most fun games that I've played in a while. Not to mention that it is a good simulation, too. What more could I ask for?"

In Issue 79 of the UK magazine Games & Puzzles, Nick Palmer called Double Star "something of an anomaly, building a medium-sized game on a decidedly basic framework." After an in-depth examination of the game, Palmer concluded by giving it an Excitement rating of 3 out of 5, saying, "On the whole, my impression is that the game has suffered from a shortage of development time. There are several interesting ideas, but the triviality of the movement system and the small choice of scenarios detract from the overall impact [...] I'm not sure that it will be played more than a couple of times."

In a retrospective review in Issue 7 of Simulacrum, Joe Scoleri commented, "Realistic or not, there's no denying that Double Star offers a good deal of variety within the bounds of the conflict it depicts." Scoleri concluded, "Although Double Star shares superficial similarities with other sci-fi games, its unique background makes it truly one of a kind."

== Reviews ==
- Analog Science Fiction and Fact

== See also ==
- Galac-Tac
- Starweb
