= Dark Nebula (board game) =

Science fiction tabletop wargame

- Box cover by Charles Bernard
- Designers: Marc W. Miller
- Illustrators: Paul R. Banner
- Publishers: Game Designers' Workshop
- Publication: 1980; 45 years ago
- Genres: Board wargame
- Series: Traveller boardgames

Dark Nebula is a two-player science fiction board wargame published by Game Designers' Workshop (GDW) in 1980.

== Gameplay ==
Dark Nebula is a strategic game about space combat which is based on the previously published Imperium board game. Dark Nebula was part of a series produced by GDW called "Series 120" — games with 120 pieces that were designed to be learned and played in 120 minutes. The names of the opposing forces, the Solomani Confederation and the Aslan Hierate, are taken from GDW's Traveller science fiction role-playing game.

=== Components ===
The game comes with a rule book, 120 counters representing the various ships and troops, and an astromorphic map consisting of 8" x 5.5" sections that can be placed in various configurations.

=== Scenarios ===
Specific scenarios are not offered, but a mechanism is given to randomly build the map, and also to randomly select neutral forces that will be on the map with the two opposing forces.

== Publication history ==
Dark Nebula, designed by Marc W. Miller, was published in 1980 by GDW, the seventh Traveller boardgame published by GDW. A second edition was published in 1983 with a new cover. Dark Nebula was republished in 2004 as part of Far Future Enterprises Traveller: The Classic Games, Games 1-6+.

== Reception ==
In Issue 46 of the British wargaming magazine Perfidious Albion, Charles Vasey called this "A Series 120 Imperium spin-off. Uses smaller hexes and counters than the original but is the same system. Rules seem to have been tightened up and the concept of wars and the Imperium have been removed." Vasey concluded, "Both sides may explore the Dark Nebula with special vessels (treading boldly of course) and find some very tedious advantages for their war-effort. This is a rather weak element in the package, but who will complain with Imperium for £4.50?"

Colin Reynolds reviewed Dark Nebula for White Dwarf #20, giving it an overall rating of 9 out of 10, and stated that "Dark Nebula is full of colour, reflected both in the sense of visual appreciation and of variety in play. The game is well balanced, fast and furious, and deserves to be placed alongside its fore-runner as a classic."

In the September 1980 edition of Dragon (Issue #41), Roberto Camino thought Dark Nebula did not compare well to its predecessor, Imperium. He found this to be especially true of the smaller and less informative cardboard counters, commenting that "Something was lost in the passage to Dark Nebula's counter mix." Camino did find the ships in this game more powerful than Imperium, and welcomed the addition of armor units. But he noted that the presence of only one fuel tanker for each fleet "tends to funnel operations." Camino thought the game's biggest flaw was its lack of balance: "What does not seem to vary is the fate of the Aslans. They appear doomed to be the vassals of the Solomani. The Solomani have 20% greater resources, and their capital is more easily defended [...] It seems that an otherwise outstanding buy for six dollars may be fatally marred by play balance."

In the November 1980 edition of The Space Gamer (Issue No. 33), Forrest Johnson thought Dark Nebula was not as good as its predecessor, Imperium, saying, "If you have a copy of Imperium, there is no reason to invest in Dark Nebula. If you don't own Imperium, buy it - and forget about Dark Nebula.

== See also ==
Traveller boardgames
