= Fifth Frontier War =

Science fiction tabletop wargame

Battles for the Spinward Marches
- Box cover by Richard Flory
- Designers: Marc W. Miller
- Illustrators: Paul R. Banner
- Publishers: Game Designers' Workshop
- Publication: 1981; 45 years ago
- Genres: Science fiction Board wargame
- Series: Traveller boardgames

Fifth Frontier War two-player science fiction board wargame published by Game Designers' Workshop (GDW) in 1981. Fifth Frontier War is the fifth Traveller boardgame published by GDW. It was republished in 2004 as part of Far Future Enterprises Traveller: The Classic Games, Games 1-6+.

== Setting ==
Although Fifth Frontier War shares the universe and history of the Traveller role-playing game, it is a stand-alone board game with no elements of role-playing. In the Traveller universe, the Imperium and the Zhodani Consulate have been warring with each other for control of the Spinward Marches. The title of this game refers to the fifth confrontation between the two superpowers, a Zhodani offensive.

== Gameplay ==
The game components are:

- a 22" x 28" map depicting the Jewell, Regina, Lanth, and Vilis subsectors, and parts of four other subsectors, which involve a total of 146 star systems. The map includes details of each star system (starport class, presence of gas giant for refuelling, bases, and high population if applicable)
- 480 counters representing combat units
- 240 counters to record losses of ground troops and system defense boats
- a rulebook
- 2 six-sided dice

The game starts with invasion of the subsectors by the Zhodani forces. Sequence of play each following turn is subdivided into four phases.

1. Reinforcement
2. Movement
3. Combat
4. Plotting and Reorganization

Movement In the Traveller universe, there is no means of instantaneous communication, and information can only move as fast as the fastest ship. To simulate this lack of knowledge of the tactical situation, movement must be plotted several turns ahead — four turns for the Zhodani player, five turns for the Imperium player. (Both sides have counters representing admirals whose tactical abilities allow the player to modify the number of turns needed to pre-plot movement. At the end of each movement phase, ships that have moved must refuel, either from a gas giant, a planetary ocean, a tanker or a starport.

Combat As fleets move into position to assault planets, there are several types of combat.

- Starship versus starship: Starships total their combat factors and roll dice against a resolution table. (This can be modified by the tactical ratings of admirals, if applicable.) The result is expressed as defense factors which have to be lost, either by reducing the strength of squadrons, or by eliminating squadrons.
- Starship versus planetary System Defense Boats (SDBs): The combat resolution against the SDBs uses a table that expresses losses as a percentage. Combat resolution against the attack starships is resolved using the same table and reduction system as starship versus starship.
- Starship bombardement of planet: Losses of planetary ground troops are expressed as a percentage of total strength
- Invasion of planet: Combat factors of opposing squadrons are compared to create an odds ratio. (Tech levels of the forces can modify this ratio.) This ratio on the appropriate table resolves as losses expressed as a percentage of the squadron's combat factor.

Each side gains victory points by capturing worlds. Usually the number of victory points awarded is equal to the tech level of the world captured. The game ends either when one player accumulates a pre-determined number of victory points, or when both sides agree to an armistice.

== Reception ==
In the December 1981 edition of The Space Gamer (Issue No. 46), William A. Barton gave a strong recommendation to the game, saying, "if [...] you are interested in the outcome of events in the Traveller universe or you like a game that takes a lot of thought and a lot of playing time [...] I can heartily recommend Fifth Frontier War."

In the February–March 1982 edition of White Dwarf (Issue 29), John Roberts liked most of the game, but criticized the victory conditions, pointing out that a high tech world with low population gives the same number of victory points as a high tech world with high population (and better defenses), unbalancing the game in favour of the Zhodani player: "As a result, the vast invading fleets head straight for the low population, high tech level worlds, and steer clear of the important but highly defended high tech high population worlds. Hence the Zhodani achieve the victory conditions with ease by dominating only a small population." As a result, Roberts rated the game 8 out of 10 with the comment "an excellent game, but spoiled by those victory conditions."

In the March 1982 edition of Dragon (Issue 62), Tony Watson called Fifth Frontier War "a grand strategic science fiction game." Watson found the game well-balanced but very complex, and thought the suggested game length of 4–6 hours was overly optimistic. He concluded, "Fifth Frontier War is a good game, but it may be a bit involved for some players. It certainly succeeds in its intention of simulating a large interstellar campaign. The game has detail and realism. If it plays something like a historical simulation, that's because it essentially is one, considering the meticulously prepared background the game is drawn from."

In the Winter 1983 edition of Ares (Issue 13), Greg Costikyan criticized the length of the game, which he estimated could take as long as 35 hours — far longer than the 4–6 hour estimate on the back cover of the box. Costikyan also thought the game was unbalanced in favour of the Zhodani, who start with their entire fleet on the map, while the Imperium "enter in dribs and drabs." However, Costikyan called these problems "quibbles", and recommended the game, saying, "Fifth Frontier War is perhaps the most innovative and interesting science fiction game to have been published in the last year. Its strategic complexities are intriguing, it's fun to play and — a rarity — it is an excellent simulation of an SF situation. GDW shows again that they are without peer in the design of serious science fiction."

== See also ==
- Galac-Tac
- Starweb
- Traveller boardgames
