= Siege of Prague (disambiguation) =

Siege of Prague may refer to:

- Siege of Prague (1309–1310), by the Meissener forces
- Siege of Prague (1420), by the Catholic forces of Sigismund of Luxembourg as a part of the First crusade against the Hussites (Hussite Wars)
- Siege of Prague (1648), a three-months lasting siege by Swedish forces during the Thirty Years' War
- Siege of Prague (1742), by Austrian forces during the War of the Austrian Succession
- Siege of Prague (1757), by Prussian forces during the Seven Years' War following the battle of Prague

== See also ==
- Battle of Prague
