= Desert Falcons (board game) =

Board game expansion

Desert Falcons is a board game expansion published in 1988 by Game Designers' Workshop.

== Contents ==
Desert Falcons is the second expansion module to the Air Superiority air combat wargame and provides more types of aircraft and options for rules.

== Reception ==
Lee Brimmicombe-Wood reviewed Desert Falcons for Games International magazine, and gave it 4 stars out of 5, and stated that "For the fervent Air Superiority fan this is an essential buy and I unhesitatingly recommend it, although I suspect that the casual gamer might find the new rules and primitive jets depicted only of passing interest."

== Reviews ==
- Fire & Movement #67
- Casus Belli #50
