= Coral Sea (wargame) =

Board wargame

Cover of 2nd edition rulebook with artwork by Rodger B. MacGowan, 1976

Coral Sea, subtitled "Turning the Japanese Advance, 1942", is a board wargame published by Game Designers' Workshop (GDW) in 1974 that simulates the Battle of the Coral Sea in the Pacific Theater of World War II.

== Background ==
In May 1942, Japanese and American aircraft carrier fleets engaged in long-distance combat in the area of the Coral Sea, the first action in which aircraft carriers engaged each other and the first in which the opposing ships neither sighted nor fired directly upon one another.

== Description ==
Coral Sea is a two-player wargame in which one player controls the Japanese fleet, and the other player controls the American fleet.

=== Components ===
The ziplock bag contains:

- 22" x 28" paper hex grid map scaled at 40 mi (65 km) per hex
- 240 die-cut counters
- rulebook
- various charts and player aids

=== Gameplay ===
The game has two phases. First the opposing fleets must be located. While aircraft on the map can always be seen by both players, fleets are hidden, and players use the numbered hex grid system to track their fleet movements. Fleet locations are only revealed when spotted by aircraft, reconnaissance ships or coast watchers. Once a fleet has been spotted, the opposing player can send airplanes to attack. There are also rules to cover air craft maintenance, coast-watchers, and amphibious invasions,

== Publication history ==
In 1974, Marc W. Miller designed Coral Sea, and it was published by GDW as a ziplock bag game with artwork by Rodger B. MacGowan. A second edition with slightly revised rules was published by GDW in 1976.

== Reception ==
In the 1977 book The Comprehensive Guide to Board Wargaming, Nick Palmer thought the combination of open air movement and hidden sea movement was unusual. He noted the "highly detailed ship and air descriptions" and that "90% of the ship and air counters are interchangeable with [companion game] Battle for Midway." Palmer concluded with a warning about the complexity of the game, saying, "noted for realism, but rules require concentration."

In The Guide to Simulations/Games for Education and Training, Martin Campion commented that "the antiaircraft ought to be toned down and a fully secret movement and search system used."

In Issue 1 of Command, Dennis Agosta warned that "Aircraft are not universally available, but require maintenance between flights. Thus each side builds up its available strength over several turns, and then makes a bold, swift strike."

== Other reviews and commentary ==
- Strategy & Tactics #29, #38 and #65
- Fire & Movement #7, #12 and #67
- Phoenix #4
- Panzerfaust Magazine #68
