= The Campaign for North Africa =

Strategic board wargame

- Designers: Richard Berg
- Publishers: Simulation Publications
- Publication: 1978
- Genres: Military simulation
- Players: 2–10
- Playing time: Up to 1,500 hours
- Synonyms: CNA

The Campaign for North Africa (CNA), subtitled The Desert War, 1940–43, is a strategic board wargame published by Simulations Publications, Inc. (SPI) in 1978 that simulates the entire North African campaign of World War II. It is considered one of the most complex wargames ever published, with ten recommended players and an estimated total playtime of 1,500 hours. The game was not fully playtested before release and though creator Richard Berg speculated the game likely has been fully completed at some point, no full completion has been published.

== Description ==
The Campaign for North Africa has been called the longest board game ever produced, with estimates that a full game would take 1,500 hours to complete. Reviewer Luke Winkie pointed out that "If you and your group meets for three hours at a time, twice a month, you'd wrap up the campaign in about 20 years." It has also been called the most complex wargame ever designed, with the commonly cited example (noted in SPI's advertising) that Italian troops require additional water supplies to prepare pasta. The map board alone is 9.5 ft (3 m) long.

Nominally a two-player game, the rules recommend ten players divided into two teams of five people, each team composed of a Commander-In-Chief, Logistics Commander, Rear Area Commander, Air Commander, and Front-line Commander.

=== Components ===
The boxed set contained in a large 4 inch deep box includes:

- five 34 in × 23 in (86 cm × 58 cm) paper hex grid maps scaled at 8 km (5 mi) per hex with thirty-one types of terrain; the maps when placed together form a single 34 in × 115 in (86 cm × 292 cm) board.
- 1,800 counters
- 6 booklets:
  1. "Historical Background": 16 page analysis of the North African campaign written by Al Nofi, Richard Berg, and Jim Dunnigan
  2. "Land Game Rules of Play": 45 pages, plus 2 pages of addenda
  3. "Air and Logistics Game Rules of Play and Scenarios": 23 pages of rules, 14 pages of scenarios, 7 pages of designer's notes
  4. "Charts and Tables Common to Both Players": 16 pages
  5. "Axis Exclusive Charts and Tables": 36 pages, including 73 charts and tables
  6. "Commonwealth Exclusive Charts and Tables" 32 pages including 58 charts and tables
- 12 logistical sheets
- 3 plastic counter storage trays
- 2 six-sided dice, one larger and one smaller.

=== Gameplay ===
The Wargamer Academy rates the complexity of CNA, on a scale of 1–10, as 10+. The complete campaign game takes 111 turns, each turn representing one week of game time. A number of shorter scenarios are included that are still long in comparison to other wargames. As reviewers noted, the game is less about combat, and more about managing logistics, supply lines, and sanity.

To give an idea of the game's complexity, reviewer Nicholas Palmer outlined the actions for one side's single turn. As a first step, before playing, the player or team must make unit organization charts for every one of the hundreds of counters on their side. Then each turn:

- Plan strategic air missions
- Raid Malta
- Plan Axis convoys
- Raid convoys
- Distribute stores and consume stores
- Calculate spillage/evaporation of water and adjust all supply dumps
- Determine initiative
- Determine weather (hotter weather results in more evaporation of water)
- Distribute water
- Reorganize units
- Calculate attrition of units short of water and stores
- Begin building construction
- Begin training
- Rearrange supplies
- Transport cargo between African ports
- Bring convoys ashore
- Deploy Commonwealth fleet
- Ship repair
- Plan tactical air mission if airplanes are fuelled
- Begin air mission
  - Fight air-to-air combat
  - Fire flak
  - Carry out mission, return to base, airplane maintenance.
- Place land units on reserve
- Movement:
  - Move units, tracking fuel expenditure and breakdown points vis a vis weather
  - Enemy reaction
  - Move more units
- Combat:
  - Designate each tank and gun as deployed forward or back
  - Plot and fire barrages
  - Retreat before assault
  - Secretly assign all units to anti-armor or close-assault roles
  - Anti-armor fire
  - Adjust ammunition
  - Deploy destroyed tank markers and update unit records to reflect losses.
  - Carry out probes and close assaults
- Release reserves
- Move rear trucks
- Begin repair of breakdowns
- Make patrols
- Repeat all movement and combat steps a second time
- Repeat all movement and combat steps a third time

This entire sequence would then be repeated by the other player or team, completing one game turn.

== Publication history ==
In the mid-1970s, SPI's house magazine Strategy & Tactics gathered feedback from players that indicated the desire for a massive game. Responding to this feedback, SPI envisioned several huge wargames that would be called the "Heuristic Intensive Manual Simulation Series". In 1976, a team of developers started to create CNA, with Richard Berg responsible for the gigantic map. After six months, all of the other developers had left the project, and Berg was asked to complete the game on his own, which he took two years to complete. Redmond A. Simonsen provided cartography and graphic design. The game was so massive that playtesting was not completed before the game was published by SPI in 1979, retailing for $44. This was the one and only game published under the "Heuristic Intensive Manual Simulation Series" label.

Critic John Kula, writing twenty years after the game's publication, noted that development of a game this size was solely driven by player feedback. "So why produce a game which is unplayable? Well apparently the feedback responses that governed Jim Dunnigan and SPI indicated that gamers wanted such monster games. And true to the old curse, gamers got what they asked for. This is likely the single biggest difficulty with reader feedback — everyone knows what they want, but few know what they need."

Following the demise of SPI, Decision Games acquired the rights to CNA, and in 2016-2017, started the process of streamlining and simplifying the rules, with an advertised publication date of 2020 for the retitled "North African Campaign." After Richard Berg's death in 2019, the prospects of this project was uncertain. As of December 2024, the North African Campaign game was slated for play-testing. As of 2026 the game is available for pre-order via the Decision Games website.

== Reception ==
In Issue 21 of Fire & Movement, Gary Charbonneau wrote, "You may have heard rumors that this game would be unplayable. It is."

In his 1980 book The Best of Board Wargaming, Nicholas Palmer noted that despite the game's obvious complexity, "the rules are clear and entertainingly written, there are copious notes, and the basic system does seem to have been properly playtested." Nevertheless he called the game "a mind-bogglingly slow job; no doubt the first ten turns are the hardest." He concluded by giving CNA a very poor "excitement" grade of only 15% but a "realism" grade of 100%.

In Issue 49 of Moves, Thomas G. Pratuch called the game so big that "it defies immediate analysis of the tactical and strategic planning necessary to win the game." However, he called the game's scenarios the most complex designed to date. He also believed that players could use the game rules as a framework for designing new scenarios.

In Issue 24 of Phoenix, Bob Campbell called CNA "certainly the best simulation of the desert war yet", despite its length. He found a mismatch between the "simple but laborious" logistics system and the very complex combat system. He especially found the air game to be overly complex, pointing out that designer Richard Berg admitted this in the Designer's Notes. Campbell concluded that the game was "a success, if only a partial success. It does not contain the ultimate truth about North Africa, but there's enough there to get on with."

In the 1980 book The Complete Book of Wargames, game designer Jon Freeman noted the complete game would take at least 1500 hours to complete, and responded, "Balance? Who cares? To survive is to win." He further commented that this "was not a game, and to consider it as such is a big mistake. It's a history lesson—a pure simulation. On that level, it is quite an achievement; for people looking for a good 'game,' it is totally worthless." He gave the game an Overall Evaluation of "Very Good for historians, Very Poor for anyone else", concluding, "the game is overly complex and overlong—pure overkill."

In a 2012 review, game designer Andrea Angiolino called CNA "the most complicated board game ever released."

In a retrospective review almost 40 years after CNA's publication, Luke Winkie called the arcane complexity of the game "transparently absurd", pointing out the example that each turn, every unit loses 3% of its fuel due to evaporation, except for British units, which lose 7% because historically they used 50-gallon drums instead of jerry cans. He admitted that due to its complexity, "The Campaign for North Africa will seduce new players for the rest of time."

== Cultural references ==
In the 2018, season 11 episode 16 of The Big Bang Theory, Sheldon suggests that his friends play the game while waiting for Bernadette to go into labor during her overdue pregnancy. His friends are completely uninterested in the game, so Sheldon enthusiastically plays their turns as they halfheartedly look on. He references its complexity, with lines like, "Welcome to the next five to eight weeks of your life!".

In 2025, the podcast War With a Mate was launched by two friends from England, Andy Taeger and James Purcell. The podcast documents their playthrough of The Campaign for North Africa, beginning with a six-turn practice run, which took 20 months to complete. They commenced the full 111-turn game on October 30, 2026.
