= Game Designers' Workshop =

Wargame and roleplaying game publisher

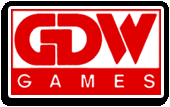
- Type: Corporation (1973–1996)
- Industry: Wargame and Role-playing game publisher
- Founded: June 22, 1973
- Defunct: February 29, 1996
- Headquarters: Normal, Illinois, United States
- Key people: Frank Chadwick, Rich Banner, John Harshman, Marc Miller, Loren Wiseman
- Products: Wargames, role-playing games

Game Designers' Workshop (GDW) was a wargame and role-playing game publisher from 1973 to 1996. Many of their games are now carried by other publishers.

== History ==
Game Designers' Workshop was originally established June 22, 1973. The founding members consisted of Frank Chadwick, Rich Banner, Marc Miller, and Loren Wiseman. GDW acquired the Conflict Games Company from John Hill in the early 1970s.

GDW published a new product approximately every twenty-two days for over twenty years. In an effort to bridge the gap between role players, board wargamers and miniature wargamers, the company published RPGs with fantastic settings alongside games with realistic themes including rulesets for 15mm and 20mm miniatures set during the American Civil War, World War I, World War II, and the modern era; and boardgames involving these eras such as the Air Superiority series and Harpoon.

The company disbanded February 29, 1996 after suffering financial troubles.

== Products ==
=== Role-playing games ===
- En Garde! (1975): Dueling game set in 17th-century France, often run as a play-by-mail game.
- Traveller (1977): A science fiction game originally intended as a ruleset for generic space adventures. Revised and reissued as Megatraveller (1987) and with completely different rules and a greatly changed setting as Traveller: The New Era (1993)
- Twilight: 2000 (1984): An alternate history game set in a Europe devastated by nuclear war, with adventures and supplements also dealing with the U.S. and Bangkok.
- Traveller: 2300 (1987): A hard science fiction roleplaying game, set 300 years after the Twilight War featured in Twilight: 2000. Traveller: 2300 was later renamed to 2300 AD in (1988) with the release of the second edition.
- Space: 1889 (1988): Victorian-era spacefaring game which provided for roleplay opportunities, steampunk aerial gunboat engagements and "colonial" miniature warfare with retro-futuristic elements such as Martian brave warbands and odd space creatures.
- Cadillacs and Dinosaurs (1990): Based on the underground comic book Xenozoic Tales.
- Dark Conspiracy (1991): a near-future horror role-playing game (RPG), created by Lester Smith
- Dangerous Journeys (1992): Roleplaying game created by Gary Gygax, the co-creator of the original Dungeons & Dragons system.

=== Board games ===
| Game | Year | Designer | Category | Notes |
|---|---|---|---|---|
| 1940 | 1980 | Frank Chadwick | wargame | Series 120 |
| 1941 | 1981 | John Astell | wargame | Series 120 |
| 1942 | 1978 | Marc Miller | wargame | Series 120 |
| 1815: The Waterloo Campaign | 1975 (2nd ed. 1982) | Frank Chadwick | wargame | |
| 8th Army: Operation Crusader | 1984 | Frank Chadwick | wargame | Double Blind series |
| Battle of Agincourt - 1415 AD | 1978 | Marc Miller | wargame | Series 120 |
| Air Strike | 1987 | JD Webster | wargame | Air Superiority series |
| Air Superiority | 1987 | JD Webster | wargame | Air Superiority series |
| Battle of Alma | 1978 | Frank Chadwick | wargame | Series 120 |
| Arctic Front | 1985 | Frank Chadwick | wargame | The Third World War series |
| Assault | 1983 | Frank Chadwick | wargame | Assault series |
| Asteroid | 1980 | Frank Chadwick | sci-fi | Series 120 |
| Attack in the Ardennes | 1982 | Frank Chadwick | wargame | |
| Avalanche | 1976 | Frank Chadwick | wargame | |
| Azhanti High Lightning | 1980 | Frank Chadwick & Marc Miller | sci-fi | Charles S. Roberts Award winner |
| Bar-Lev | 1977 | Frank Chadwick | wargame | Acquired from John Hill/Conflict Games |
| Battle for Basra | 1991 | Frank Chadwick | wargame | First Battle series |
| Battle Rider | 1994 | Frank Chadwick | sci-fi | |
| Battlefield Europe | 1990 | Frank Chadwick | wargame | First Battle series |
| Beda Fomm | 1979 | Frank Chadwick | wargame | Series 120 |
| Belter | 1979 | Frank Chadwick | sci-fi | |
| Blood & Thunder | 1992 | Frank Chadwick | wargame | First Battle series |
| Bloodtree Rebellion | 1979 | Lynn Willis | sci-fi | |
| Bloody Kasserine | 1992 | Frank Chadwick | wargame | |
| Blue Max | 1983 | Phil Hall | wargame | |
| Boots & Saddles | 1984 | Frank Chadwick | wargame | Assault series |
| Brilliant Lances | 1993 | David Nilsen | sci-fi | |
| Bundeswehr | 1986 | Frank Chadwick | wargame | Assault series |
| Burma | 1976 | Bob Fowler | wargame | |
| Case White | 1977 | Frank Chadwick | wargame | Europa series game VII |
| Chaco | 1973 | Marc Miller | wargame | |
| Chieftain | 1988 | Frank Chadwick | wargame | Assault series |
| Citadel: The Battle of Dien Bien Phu | 1977 | Frank Chadwick | wargame | 2 Game Designer Guild Awards |
| Coral Sea | 1974 (2nd ed. 1976) | Marc Miller | wargame | |
| Crimea | 1975 | Frank Chadwick | wargame | |
| Dark Nebula | 1980 | Marc Miller | sci-fi | Series 120 |
| Desert Falcons | 1989 | JD Webster | wargame | Air Superiority series |
| Double Star | 1979 | Marc Miller | sci-fi | |
| Drang Nach Osten! | 1973 | Frank Chadwick | wargame | Europa series game I |
| Eagles | 1974 | Loren Wiseman | wargame | |
| En Garde! | 1975 (2nd ed. 1977) | Darryl Hany | rpg | |
| Eylau | 1980 | Rik Fontana | wargame | |
| The Fall of France | 1981 | John Astell | wargame | Europa series game VIII |
| The Fall of Tobruk | 1978 | Frank Chadwick | wargame | |
| Fifth Frontier War | 1981 | Marc Miller | sci-fi | |
| Fire in the East | 1984 | John Astell | wargame | Europa series game I |
| Great Patriotic War | 1988 | Frank Chadwick | wargame | |
| Guilford Courthouse | 1978 | Greg Novak | wargame | Series 120 |
| Harpoon | 1987 | Larry Bond | wargame | includes supplement Troubled Waters |
| Harpoon: Captain's Edition | 1990 | Larry Bond | wargame | |
| A House Divided | 1981 (2nd ed. 1989) | Frank Chadwick | wargame | 2 time Charles S. Roberts Award winner |
| Illad | 1978 | Rik Fontana | sci-fi | |
| Imperium | 1977 | Marc Miller | sci-fi | |
| Indian Ocean Adventure | 1978 | Marc Miller | wargame | |
| Invasion Earth | 1981 | Marc Miller | sci-fi | |
| Kasserine Pass | 1977 | Frank Chadwick | wargame | |
| La Bataille de la Moscowa | 1977 & 1988 | John Harshman | wargame | |
| Last Battle | 1989 | Tim Ryan | rpg | |
| The Battle of Lobositz | 1978 | Frank Chadwick | wargame | Series 120 |
| Manassas | 1975 (2nd ed. 1976) | Tom Eller | wargame | |
| Marita-Merkur | 1978 | Rich Banner | wargame | Europa series game III |
| Mayday | 1978 | Marc Miller | sci-fi | Charles S. Roberts Award winner |
| Battle for Midway | 1976 | Marc Miller | wargame | |
| Battle for Moscow | 1986 | Frank Chadwick | wargame | Free giveaway, Charles S. Roberts Award finalist |
| Narvik | 1974 (2nd ed. 1980) | Frank Chadwick | wargame | Europa series game IV |
| The Near East | 1983 | John Astell | wargame | Europa series game IX |
| The Normandy Campaign | 1983 | Ben Knight | wargame | Double Blind series |
| Operation Crusader | 1978 | Frank Chadwick | wargame | |
| 8th Army: Operation Crusader – The Winter Battles for Tobruk, 1941 | 1984 | Frank Chadwick | wargame | Double blind series |
| Operation Market Garden | 1985 | Frank Chadwick | wargame | Double Blind series |
| Over the Top | 1990 | Greg Novak | wargame | Command Decision series rules |
| Overlord | 1978 | Frank Chadwick | wargame | |
| Pearl Harbor | 1977 (2nd ed. 1979) | John Prados | wargame | 2nd edition developed by Marc Miller |
| Persian Gulf | 1986 | Frank Chadwick | wargame | The Third World War series |
| Pharsalus | 1977 | Loren Wiseman | wargame | |
| Phase Line Smash | 1992 | Frank Chadwick | wargame | solitaire game |
| Port Arthur | 1976 | Marc Miller | wargame | |
| The Battle of Prague | 1980 | Frank Chadwick | wargame | Series 120 |
| The Race for Tunis | 1992 | Frank Chadwick | wargame | |
| The Battle of Raphia, 217 B.C. | 1977 | Marc Miller | wargame | Series 120 |
| Red Army | 1982 | John Astell | wargame | |
| Red Empire | 1990 | Frank Chadwick | wargame | |
| Red Star/White Eagle | 1979 | Dave Williams | wargame | |
| Reinforcements | 1985 | Frank Chadwick | wargame | Assault series: Russo–Polish War |
| Road to the Rhine | 1979 | Frank Chadwick | wargame | |
| The Sands of War Expansion Kit | 1992 | Frank Chadwick | wargame | First Battle series |
| The Sands of War | 1991 | Frank Chadwick | wargame | First Battle series |
| Scorched Earth | 1987 | John Astell | wargame | Europa series game II |
| Snapshot | 1979 | Marc Miller | sci-fi | |
| Soldier King | 1982 | Frank Chadwick | wargame | |
| Southern Front | 1984 | Frank Chadwick | wargame | The Third World War series |
| Spain & Portugal | 1984 | Frank Chadwick | wargame | Europa series game X |
| Suez '73 | 1981 | Frank Chadwick | wargame | |
| SSN | 1975 | Stephen Newberg | wargame | |
| Stand & Die | 1991 | Frank Chadwick | wargame | First Battle series |
| Tacforce | 1980 | Frank Chadwick | wargame | miniatures rules |
| Team Yankee | 1987 | Frank Chadwick | wargame | First Battle series |
| Test of Arms | 1988 | Larry Smith | wargame | First Battle series |
| Tet Offensive: 1968 | 1991 | Frank Chadwick | wargame | |
| Their Finest Hour | 1976 | Marc Miller | wargame | Europa series game V |
| Their Finest Hour | 1982 & 1984 | John Astell | wargame | Europa series game V |
| The Third World War | 1984 | Frank Chadwick | wargame | The Third World War series |
| Torch | 1985 | John Astell | wargame | Europa series game XI |
| Torgau | 1974 | Frank Chadwick | wargame | |
| Trenchfoot | 1981 | Frank Chadwick | wargame | |
| Triplanetary | 1973 (2nd ed. 1981) | John Harshman, Marc Miller | sci-fi | |
| Tsushima | 1976 | Marc Miller | wargame | |
| Unentschieden | 1973 | Frank Chadwick | wargame | Europa series game II |
| Verdun | 1978 | Marc Miller | wargame | |
| Western Desert | 1983 | John Astell | wargame | Europa series game VI |
| White Death | 1979 | Frank Chadwick | wargame | |
| Yalu | 1978 | John Hill | wargame | |

=== Miniatures rules ===
- Fire & Steel (Napoleonic Wars, 1978)
- Harpoon (modern naval combat), later developed into a computer game
- Johnny Reb (American Civil War)
- Striker (science fiction, 1983), another Traveller based game.
- Command Decision (20th century warfare, World War II. 1st and 2nd editions; a 3rd edition was written by Frank Chadwick and published in 1998 by EHQ and Old Glory)
- Combined Arms (Cold War, post-WWII)
- TacForce (20th century warfare)
- Over the Top (20th century, WWI)
- Star Cruiser (23rd century space warfare) a 2300AD-based game
- Sky Galleons of Mars (Space 1889 aerial warfare, boxed board game with miniatures)
- Cloudships and Gunboats (Space 1889 aerial Warfare, boxed board game with miniatures)
- Soldier's Companion (Space 1889 land, air and sea warfare)
- Striker II (science fiction, 1994), Traveller: The New Era–based game.
- Volley & Bayonet (big battles in black powder era, 1994)

=== Grenadier Magazine ===
The Grenadier was the house magazine from 1978 to 1990, with 35 issues. It started off as a quarterly magazine, but towards the end was published sporadically. Although it covered games from all companies, it gave most of the magazine space to GDW games.

=== Journal of the Travellers Aid Society ===
Journal of the Travellers Aid Society was a magazine dedicated to Traveller published by GDW between 1979 and 1985.

=== Challenge ===
Challenge was a role-playing game magazine that replaced Journal of the Travellers Aid Society. It covered all of GDW's role playing games, not just Traveller. It was published between 1986 and 1996.

=== Video games ===
- The Battle of Chickamauga
- Rommel: Battles for Tobruk

== Awards ==
- Best Graphics of 1976 Charles S. Roberts Award, Avalanche
- Best Fantasy/Futuristic Game of 1978 Charles S. Roberts Award, Mayday
- Best Miniatures Rules of 1978 H. G. Wells Award, Fire & Steel
- Best Historical Figure Series of 1979 H. G. Wells Award, System Seven Napoleonics
- Best Miniatures Rules of 1979 H. G. Wells Award, System Seven Napoleonics
- Best Roleplaying Adventure of 1979 H. G. Wells Award, Kinunir
- Best Magazine Covering Roleplaying of 1979 H. G. Wells Award, Journal of the Travellers Aid Society
- Best Fantasy or Science Fiction Boardgame of 1980 Charles S. Roberts Award, Azhanti High Lightning
- Best Miniatures Rules of 1980 H. G. Wells Award, Tacforce
- Best Roleplaying Adventure of 1980 H. G. Wells Award, Twilights Peak
- Best Professional Magazine Covering Roleplaying of 1980 H. G. Wells Award, Journal of the Travellers Aid Society
- Best Pre-20th Century Boardgame of 1981 Charles S. Roberts Award, House Divided
- Best Professional Roleplaying Magazine of 1981 H. G. Wells Award, Journal of the Travellers Aid Society
- All Time Best Miniatures Rules for 20th Century Land Battles of 1981 H. G. Wells Award, Tacforce
- Best Miniatures Rules of 1982 H. G. Wells Award, Striker
- Best Roleplaying Rules of 1984 H. G. Wells Award, Twilight: 2000
- Best Miniatures Rules of 1986 H. G. Wells Award, Command Decision
- Best Roleplaying Adventure of 1986 H. G. Wells Award, Going Home
- Best Boardgame Covering the Period 1900-1946 of 1987 Origins Award, Scorched Earth
- Best Boardgame Covering the Period 1947-Modern Day of 1987 Origins Award, Team Yankee
- Best Miniatures Rules of 1987 Origins Award, Harpoon
- Best Miniatures Rules of 1988 Origins Award, To The Sound of the Guns
- Best Fantasy or Science Fiction Boardgame of 1988 Origins Award, Sky Galleons of Mars
- Best Graphic Presentation of a Boardgame of 1988 Origins Award, Sky Galleons of Mars
- Best Pre-World War Two Game of 1989 Charles S. Roberts Award, House Divided (2nd edition)
- Best Roleplaying Rules of 1993 Origins Award, Traveller: the New Era
