= Asteroid (board game) =

Science fiction board game

Into an Asteroid Station, Against a Deranged Computer, To Save a Threatened World.
- First edition box cover by William H. Keith, 1980
- Designers: Marc Miller; Frank Chadwick
- Publishers: Game Designers' Workshop
- Publication: 1980; 45 years ago
- Genres: Science fiction
- Series: Series 120

Asteroid is a 1980 science fiction board game published by Game Designers' Workshop (GDW) as one of their 120 series. Players must destroy a mad scientist's computer-controlled asteroid before it crashes into Earth.

== Gameplay ==
Asteroid is a two-player game designed by Marc Miller and Frank Chadwick in which a mad scientist has programmed a computer-controlled asteroid to crash into the Earth, resulting in an extinction level event, and only one spaceship is able to intercept the asteroid and try to save the world.

One player must put together a team consisting of adventurers — accompanied by Sasha the dog — that will try to overcome the computerized defenses of the asteroid and start the self-destruct sequence that will destroy the asteroid. The other player arranges eight geomorphic tiles to represent the asteroid's cave system and controls the asteroid's robotic defenses.

There are several special rules for various personality interactions. For example, Sasha the dog hates a person called Carter, and will not go through any door that Carter has opened.

Both players may come across some of the mad scientist's other inventions, including a disintegrator pistol and an invisibility belt.

There are various victory conditions that the players can claim; for example The World Preservation victory is achieved if the computer is destroyed; or an SPCA victory is claimed if Sasha the dog survives, and the victory is maximized if Carter does not survive.

Asteroid is a GDW "Series 120" game. "Series 120" indicating that the game should take less than two hours (120 minutes) to play.

== History ==
Originally published in 1980, a second edition was published in a larger box in 1983 with new cover art by Rich Banner. Hobby Japan released a Japanese language version in 1985 with a cover by Naoyuki Kato. Another Japanese language version was published in 2003 by Kokusai-Tsushin.

== Reception ==
In the December 1980 edition of The Space Gamer (Issue No. 34), William A. Barton gave a thumbs up to Asteroid, saying, "Asteroid is very playable and a lot of fun – more so than many games costing more than twice its price. Well worth the investment."

In the January 1981 edition of Ares (Issue #6), Eric Goldberg called Asteroid "a very amusing game."

In the April 1981 edition of Dragon (Issue #48), Bill Fawcett thought the variety of characters available to the player trying to save Earth was "both a strength of the game, and its largest drawback. Because of the challenges which await the first player, it is necessary to employ all of the skills possessed by every character. Because there are so many to choose from, it takes a few playings to really become adept at deciding which skills are best in certain situations and then employing them properly." Fawcett concluded with a recommendation to use this game to draw more players into the hobby, saying, "Since Asteroid has a familiar plot and is easily played, it is a nearly ideal way to introduce science-fiction gaming to a friend who has read some science fiction but not played very many games of this type."

Bob McWilliams reviewed Asteroid for White Dwarf #27, giving it an overall rating of 8 out of 10, and stated that "It is harder than it appears to distil all the elements included into such a concise and playable format, and Asteroid offers a lot of fun to those willing to play their parts to the hilt."
