= Test of Arms =

1988 modern-day board wargame

Test of Arms is a modern-day board wargame published in 1988 by Game Designers' Workshop.

== Contents ==
Test of Arms is a two-player tactical wargame that simulates various worldwide post-World War II conflicts. The game includes six geomorphic hex grid map sections, 480 counters, and 29 scenarios drawn from post-World War II tactical conflicts around the world.

=== Gameplay ===
The game uses the rules system from GDW's previously published wargame, Team Yankee, using a simplified version of a traditional "I Go, You Go" system. The basic rules are not complex. During each turn, the first player has several phases:

1. List artillery targets, and roll a die to see if air units are available
2. Attack with some or all units where they are
3. Movement. (Opponent may have opportunity for reactive fire.)
4. Attack (any unit that did not fire in Phase 2
5. Fire artillery

The second player then has the same phases to complete the current turn.

== Reception ==
Norman Smith reviewed Test of Arms for Games International magazine, and gave it 4 stars out of 5, and stated that "Despite its generalities the game gives a good representation of its subject and may have some appeal to the players of miniatures. It also plays well solitaire."

== Awards ==
At the 1989 Origins Awards, Test of Arms was a finalist for a Charles S. Roberts Award in the category "Best Post-World War II Board Game of 1988."

== Other reviews and commentary ==
- Games Review Vol.1 #7
- Casus Belli #50
