= Zone of control =

Combat unit influence in board wargames

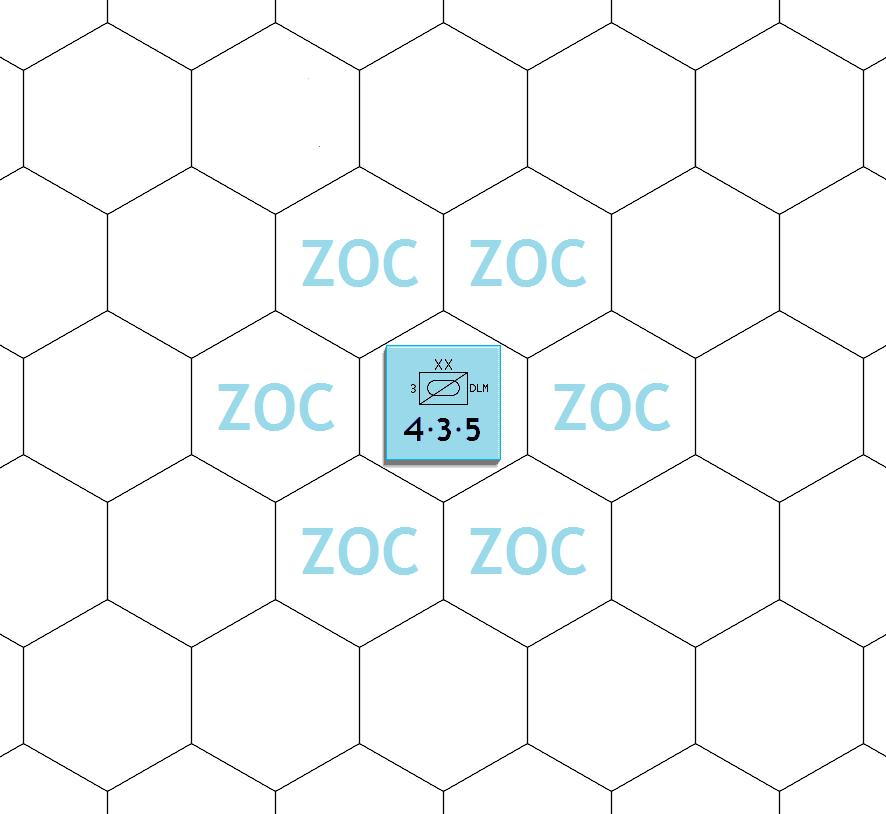
Hexagons marked "ZOC" are the zone of control for the combat unit shown in the center (for a wargame that uses hexagons).

In board wargames, a zone of control (ZOC) is the area directly adjacent to certain combat forces that affects the movement and actions of enemy combat units. In hexagonal tiled maps, a combat unit's zone of control is the six hexagons adjacent to the hexagon occupied by a unit.

The effects of zones of control can vary significantly between different wargame rules. The most common effect is that moving combat units must stop when entering an enemy unit's zone of control. This type of zone of control is termed "rigid" zone of control. If movement is not stopped, but only prohibited when moving directly from one zone of control space to another, this is termed "semi-rigid". Rules that slow down (increase movement cost) instead of stopping movement are termed "fluid" or "elastic" zones of control. Rules that prohibit leaving are termed "locking" zones of control. Some zone of control rules require enemy units must be attacked.

In some games, zones of control may be cancelled by terrain features such as rivers, cities, mountains, the presence of enemy units, or even by enemy zones of control. A couple of wargames even have zones of control partially affect friendly units, representing traffic congestion on nearby roads and access routes. Some games also have zones of control block retreats from combat, or interdict supply lines.

In theory, zones of control represent the military necessity of having to slow down in the presence of the enemy, such as moving off road, dismounting from transport, and moving through cover. In practice, since board wargames are played in turns alternating between the two players, zones of control are used to limit what one player's units can do during their turn while the other player's units are inactive, awaiting their turn. Without zones of control, players could use their fast-moving units to bypass and surround the other players' units without giving them get a chance to react.

Zones of control are also present in some strategy computer games, such as the Civilization series.
