= The Comprehensive Guide to Board Wargaming =

1977 book by Nicholas Palmer

- First edition
- Author: Nicholas Palmer
- Language: English
- Subject: Wargaming
- Publisher: Hippocrene Books
- Publication date: 1977
- Publication place: United States
- Media type: Print

The Comprehensive Guide to Board Wargaming is a 1977 book by Nicholas "Nicky" Palmer about the hobby of board wargaming.

== Contents ==
The Comprehensive Guide to Board Wargaming is a 223-page book exploring wargaming as a hobby, written for an audience of both non-gamers and gamers. The book covers the evolution of wargames, strategy and tactics employed, short reviews of the games that were available when the book was published, and concludes with a sample game as an example of the hobby for newcomers. The original edition included a sample, small scale game, complete with terrain map.

At the time of publication, Palmer explained the audience he was trying to reach, saying, "I haven't aimed the book at beginners; in particular, they get a preliminary section on a 'need to know' basis describing the basic concepts plus anything they'll need for the main part, but the rest will, I hope, interest battle-hardened veterans."

== Reception ==
In Issue 12 of the British magazine Perfidious Albion, Charles Vasey commented, "All in all this sounds like a very good introduction for novices and a valuable aid to scattered players to get into the hobby. Perhaps the most important factor is Nicky's neutrality, which means the reader will get a wide and comprehensive picture of the hobby." In Issue 21, Vasey commented "This should at best be considered 'A Comprehensive Introduction...' and as such it succeeds very well. Mr. Palmer has the ability to write so as to attract the novice even if his asides infuriate the more choleric buff." Vasey wasn't impressed by the chapter on reviews of current games, noting, "The veteran learns nothing new, and the novice gets precious little detail on what the game covers — he does learn a game exists but precious little else." Geoffrey Barnard added, "Complete newcomers will certainly find Nicky's opus of great interest, and I hope that some at least use the book as a first step into the wide wide world of wargaming."

C. Ben Ostrander reviewed The Comprehensive Guide to Board Wargaming in The Space Gamer No. 13. Ostrander commented that "The nicest thing about this book is that a publisher somewhere feels wargaming is a good enough investment for a superior 'production' book. It will become a standard reference work for board wargaming. After all, the first is always in the position to become the book of any field."

In the December 1977 issue of British Book News, Arthur Barker was enthusiastic, writing, "This truly excellent publication is to be strongly recommended for all interested in the burgeoning hobby of wargaming ... its claim to comprehensiveness is justifiable." Barker liked the inclusion of the sample game, calling it "an ideal introduction to the pastime for the beginner, who is thus encouraged to try out some of the initially rather complex ideas involving 'hexagons' and other specialties."

In Issue 11 of Phoenix, Allan Frost called the book "a classic work on wargame theory and practice. Every self-respecting wargamer should acquire it." Although Frost noted the book's relatively high price (£6.50), he thought the book was worth the price as "a well produced, clearly illustrated, 223-page tome on all aspects of board wargaming as they exist at the present time." After a summary of the book's contents, Frost concluded with a strong recommendation, saying "No doubt this book will be regarded as the book on wargaming; certainly it will be a Herculean task for anyone to better it. Can you afford to be without it?"

In Craft, Model, and Hobby Industry Magazine, Rick Mataka called this "an interesting introductory book covering this vast subject. It covers only the basics used in this hobby. A well explained book and contains numerous examples to aid in the understanding of boardgaming." Mataka concluded, "Excellent book for the novice who wants to gain some insight into the tactics used in boardgaming and the reasons behind them."
