= The Best of Board Wargaming =

Nonfiction book

- Cover
- Author: Nicholas Palmer
- Language: English
- Subject: Wargaming
- Publisher: Hippocrene Books
- Publication date: 1980
- Publication place: United States
- Media type: Print
- Pages: 194
- ISBN: 978-0882545257

The Best of Board Wargaming is a 1980 book edited by Nicholas Palmer and published by Hippocrene Books.

== Contents ==
The Best of Board Wargaming is a book that was published as a follow-up to The Comprehensive Guide to Board Wargaming (1977).

== Reception ==
In Issue 49 of the British wargaming magazine Perfidious Albion, Charles Vasey was disappointed, noting, "[Palmer's] new book The Best of Boardgaming (Arthur Barker £8.50) fails to have a marketable mission, and further fails to achieve the mission it has set for itself ... The reviews, however, are far too short, and not properly conceived for the mission in hand. If space is short you cannot afford to waste it on 'humorous' anecdotes about the game. Frequently you get too little of the game's structure or its ambience."

In Issue 39 of The Space Gamer, Steve Jackson commented "This one belongs in the library of the game club, collector, or serious designer. As a reference work for the average gamer, fantasy/SF or otherwise, I couldn't recommend it. Consumer Guide's Complete Book of Wargames [...] is bigger, better, and half the price."
