= Phoenix (wargaming magazine) =

British wargaming magazine

- Issue #1 cover
- Frequency: Bimonthly
- Publisher: Simpubs Ltd.
- First issue: June/July 1976
- Final issue Number: March/April 1982; 36
- Country: United Kingdom
- Language: English

Phoenix was a magazine primarily focussed on board wargames. It was published in the UK in the 1970s and 1980s by Simpubs Ltd., the British subsidiary of American game company Simulations Publications, Inc. (SPI).

== History ==
In 1974, SPI started to ship some of their wargames to J.D. Bardsley in the UK, who acted as a sales representative using the name SP/UK. Bardsley sold the games either via mail order or face to face at games conventions. Sales increased rapidly, and by March 1976, SP/UK had sold 25,000 units. To handle the increased sales, SPI formed a formal British subsidiary, Simpubs Ltd. in June 1976. In much the same way that SPI published their own house magazine Moves, Simpubs immediately created the bi-monthly periodical Phoenix with J.D. Bardsley as managing editor.

In the first issue (June/July 1976), Bardsley editorialized that "Phoenix is not envisaged as a 'house magazine'", and foresaw a publication of "game reviews, play strategy, game reports with historical comparisons of events, rule modifications, additional scenarios and historical articles." As well as reviews and variants for SPI products, the first issue also included reviews of wargames by rival game companies Game Designers Workshop and Avalon Hill.

The magazine was one of a number of hobby magazines in its field popular during that era.

The magazine started as a slim 12-page magazine, then expanded to 16 pages in Issue 4, to 20 pages in Issue 5, and to 24 pages in Issue 10 (November/December 1977). By 1980, The Best of Board Wargaming called it a "flourishing" publication. Notable reviews included Bob Campbell's "authoritative study" of The Campaign for North Africa in Issue 24.

In Issue 30 (March/April 1981), Phoenix reached its maximum size of 36 pages. A year later, parent company SPI ran into financial difficulty and was unexpectedly taken over by TSR. Although TSR continued to publish US-based SPI publications Strategy & Tactics, Ares and Moves, TSR cut off support to UK-based Simpub. In Issue 36 of Phoenix (March/April 1982), the first issue after the TSR takeover, editor John Spence promised that Phoenix would continue as Simpub transitioned into a new independent company.

However, no new company was ever formed, and Issue 36 proved to be the last.

== Reviews ==
- Perfidious Albion #9 (September 1976) p.19
- Perfidious Albion #13 (January 1977) p.14
- Perfidious Albion #44 (January 1980) p.8
- Perfidious Albion #46 (May 1980) p.19
- Perfidious Albion #48 (October 1980) p.19
- Perfidious Albion #49 (December 1980) p.19
