= Narvik: The Campaign in Norway, 1940 =

Board wargame

1st edition cover artwork by Don Lowry, 1974

Narvik: The Campaign in Norway, 1940 is a board wargame published by Game Designers' Workshop (GDW) in 1974 that simulates Operation Weserübung, the German invasion of Denmark and Norway during World War II. The game was one of the first in the Europa series of twenty interlocking games envisioned by GDW that would cover the entire European and North African theatres from the start to the end of World War II, using identical map scales and similar rules.

== Background ==
In the late 1930s, the German war machine was dependent on large amounts of high quality Swedish iron ore that were shipped through the Norwegian port of Narvik. In early 1940, while German and Anglo-French forces watched each other across the French border during the "Phony War" period of World War II, the English and French governments began to draw up plans to send aid to Finland, which was resisting an invasion by the Soviet Union. Plan R 4 called for Anglo-French forces to be sent through Norway and Sweden to Finland. This would include an occupation of Narvik, which would force Sweden to ship iron ore to Germany via the open Baltic Sea, making it vulnerable to interdiction by British naval forces. In April 1940, Germany preemptively circumvented this plan by invading Denmark and Norway. In response, the Allies sent forces to aid Norway; while the Royal Navy enjoyed success against the Kriegsmarine, Allied land forces were comprehensively defeated.

== Description ==
Narvik is a "monster" two-player wargame (characterized as a game with more than 1,000 counters) in which one player controls the German invaders, and the other player controls Norwegian and Allied defenders.

=== Components ===
The 1st edition game components, packaged in a ziplock bag or cardboard sleeve, are:

- three paper hex grid maps (a 21" x 27" full map and two partial maps) scaled at 16 mi (26 km) per hex
- 550 die-cut counters
- rules folder
- Various charts and player aids

The second edition increased the number of counters to 720, and combined the one full and two partial maps into two full-sized maps. The third edition (Storm Over Scandinavia) increased the number of counters to 1400, and used eight maps one-quarter the size of full Europa maps, and two maps of one-eighth size.

=== Gameplay ===
The game uses a slightly revised form of the "I Go, You Go" alternating system of turns popularized in Kursk: Operation Zitadelle (Simulations Publications Inc., 1971). In the Kursk System, one player moves and fires, and then moves their mechanized units a second time. The second player then has the same opportunity. In Narvik, phases for reinforcements and Air Power are also included:

1. Reinforcement
2. Ground and Naval Movement Phase (all units)
3. Air Phase
4. Combat Phase
5. Mechanized Movement Phase

When both players have had their turn, this completes one game turn, which represents three days of game time. The game lasts fifteen turns.

=== Scenarios ===
Narvik comes with one fifteen-turn scenario, the historical invasion of Denmark and Norway. In the 1989 edition (Storm Over Scandinavia), a number of what-if scenarios are also included:

- "The Four Hour War": What would have happened if Denmark had resisted the Germans?
- "Northern Theater of Operations": What would have happened if the Allies had occupied parts of Norway and Sweden in order to intervene in the Winter War before the German invasion occurred?
- "Invasion Sweden": What would have happened if Germany had invaded Sweden as well?

Hobby Japan edition featuring artwork by Rodger B. MacGowan, 1983

== Publication history ==
In 1973, and GDW published the monster wargame Drang Nach Osten!, a wargame designed by Paul R. Banner and Frank Chadwick that simulated Operation Barbarossa using maps scaled at 16 mi (26 km) per hex. This became the first game of Europa, a planned series of games with identical wargame rules and interlocking maps that would eventually simulate the entire Second World War in Europe. This was followed later the same year by Unentschieden ("Stalemate"), that covered the Eastern Front from the end of Operation Barbarossa to the end of the war. In 1974, Narvik was the third Europa game to be published, although it was called "Europa IV". (In planning the Europa series, GDW numbered the games by the sequence of maps that would be joined with the maps of previous games, gradually creating an entire map of Europe. Thus the game Marita-Merkur (war in the Balkans), having maps that would interface with the Soviet Union and Germany maps of Drang Nach Osten!/Unentschieden, was designated "Europa III", but it was not published until 1979, several years after Narvik ("Europa IV") and Their Finest Hour ("Europa V").

Narvik was designed by Paul R. Banner and Frank Chadwick, with cover art by Don Lowry, and was packaged in either a cardboard folder or ziplock bag. GDW published a second edition as a boxed set in 1980. In 1983, Hobby Japan published a Japanese edition with cover art by Rodger B. MacGowan.

In 1986 Game Research/Design (GR/D) took over the task of revising and completing the Europa series. In 1998, GR/D published a revised edition of Narvik titled Storm Over Scandinavia, with rules revisions by John Astell, A.E. Goodwin and Winston Hamilton, and cover art by Darla Hamilton.

== Reception ==
In a 1976 poll conducted by SPI to determine the most popular board wargames in North America, Narvik was rated very highly, placing 23rd out of 202 games.

In Issue 28 of Moves, Scott Renner called Narvik "a perfect game for the serious wargamer," although he did warn that the game "may strike some Players as unnecessarily complicated, and, in fact, almost all Players will have to look over the rules more than once, but this does not affect the playability of the game."

In Issue 18 of the British wargaming magazine Perfidious Albion, Charles Vasey found the colors of the counters and the map "little less than a joy to the eye" due to their uniformly drab colors. Vasey also complained that the rules overflowed with too much data, and added too many optional rules known as "chrome"; Vasey quoted fellow critic and game designer Richard Berg: "Too much information, too much chrome."

In his 1977 book The Comprehensive Guide to Board Wargaming, Nicholas Palmer called the game "Tense and well-balanced. There is a heavy emphasis on air combat and transportation lines through the difficult Norwegian terrain."

In Issue 7 of the UK wargaming magazine Phoenix, Rob Gibson was disappointed that the naval confrontation between the British and German navies receives short shrift, noting, "this was the major confrontation at all levels between the Royal Navy and the Kriegsmarine, and the lack of an effective naval presence tends to unbalance the land and air games, especially the latter." Despite this, Gibson concluded that "Narvik is an excellent game and a fair simulation of history to boot."

In The Guide to Simulations/Games for Education and Training, Martin Campion commented, "Narvik is difficult and not well presented for beginning players, but it is a convincing simulation of many aspects of the campaign, particularly its opening phases. It shows the sheer audacity of the German invasion and the great importance of German airpower." Campion concluded, "It is a remarkable game for its integration of land, sea, and air forces and actions."

In a retrospective review in Issue 31 of Warning Order, Matt Irsik recalled that the Europa series "was kind of the Holy Grail of gaming and Narvik was about the only game [in the series] anyone could afford." Irsik tried playing the game for the first time in 25 years, and found that the first turn was "pretty exciting with the airborne assault, naval landing, etc." But after that, "the game bogged down into playing out the string until the Germans win."

== Other reviews and commentary ==
- Fire & Movement #8 & #65
- Panzerfaust #67
- Campaign #84
- Paper Wars #25
- Casus Belli #26 (Jun 1985)
