= Fire in the East =

Board game

Fire in the East is a monster board wargame published in 1984 by Game Designers' Workshop (GDW) that simulates Operation Barbarossa, the German invasion of the Soviet Union in 1941.

== Description ==
Fire in the East, characterized as a "monster game' because it has more than 1000 counters, is a two-player (or two-team) game that covers Operation Barbarossa along World War II's Eastern Front between 22 June 1941 and 30 April 1942. The game, part of GDW's Europa series, uses a set of rules common to the series.

=== Components ===
The game box contains:

- Six 21" x 27" maps that, when put together, cover the Eastern Front from Warsaw in the west to Stalingrad in the east, and from Murmansk in the north to Sevastopol in the south. The map scale used in the entire Europa series is 25 km (16 mi) per hex.
- More than 2500 die-cut counters
- 40-page rulebook
- player charts
- two six-sided dice

=== Gameplay ===
Each turn represents 2 weeks of game time — characterized as first half of the month and last half of the month. Movement is modified by both terrain and weather. Combat results are determined by the ratio of attackers to defenders. Supplies are dependent upon home cities that act as supply depots. If a city is captured, it can never regain its "depot" status, even if recaptured.

=== Special rules ===
- Before the first turn (second half of June 1941), German force enjoy a bonus "surprise round".
- Once the surprise round is over, normal play begins with the first turn, and Romania immediately enters the war.
- During the first half of July 1941 (the second regular turn), Finland and also Hungary join the Axis forces.
  - Finnish forces may only fight in Finland and cannot cross into Soviet territory beyond a rules-established 'stop line'.
  - Due to Balkan rivalry, Hungarian and Romanian forces may not be stacked together, and cannot participate in the same attack.

=== Victory conditions ===
To win, the Axis player/team must capture every major Soviet city hex before the end of the 21st turn (second half of April 1942). The Soviet player/team wins by preventing this.

== Publication history ==
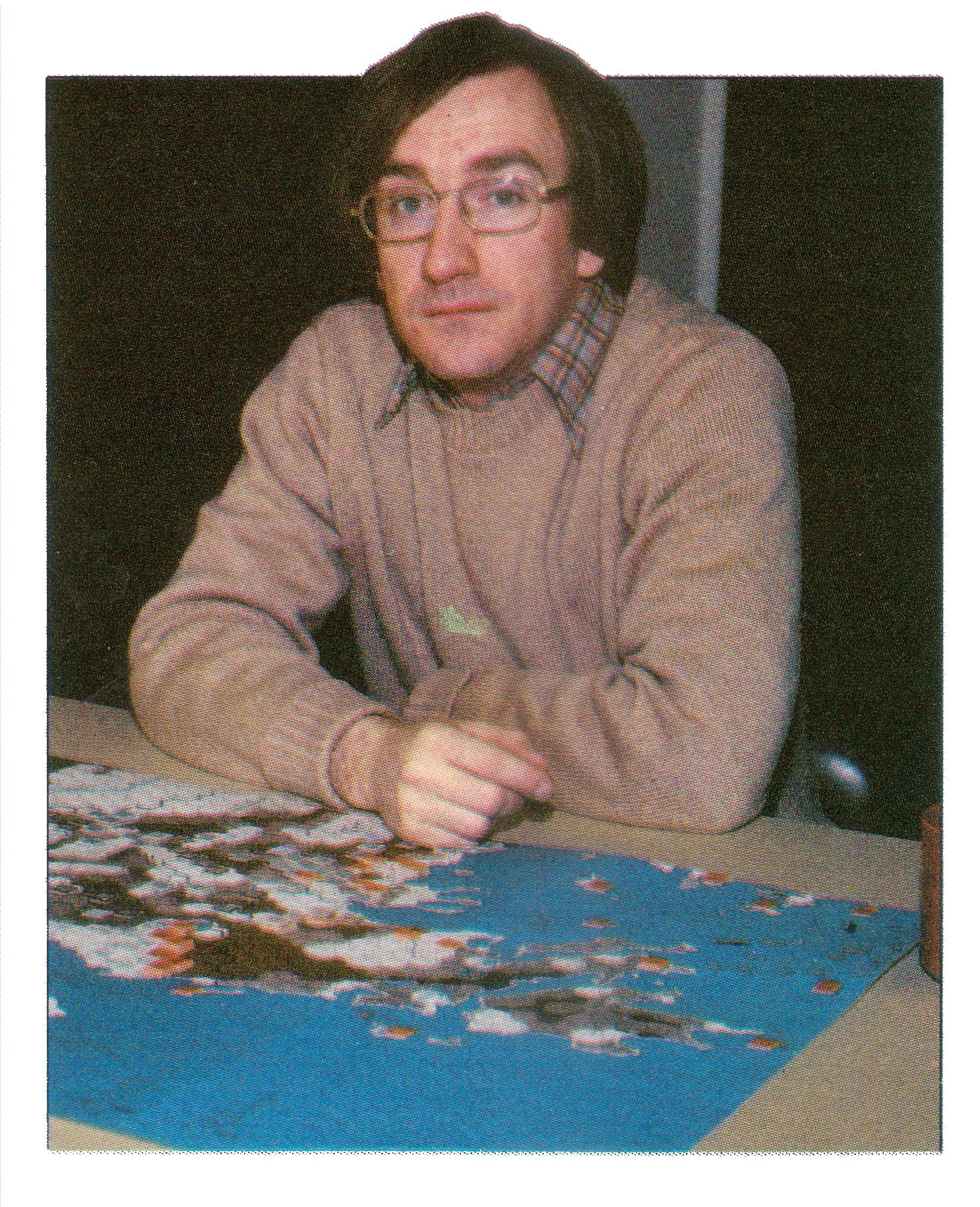
Wargame designer Paul "Rich" Banner in 1980

In 1973, GDW published Drang Nach Osten! ("Drive to the East!"), a monster board wargame simulating Operation Barbarossa designed by Paul R. Banner and Frank Chadwick. GDW also published an expansion kit, Unentschieden ("Stalemate"), in 1973.

In 1984 Rich Banner, Frank Chadwick, Marc Miller and John Astell revised and greatly expanded Drang Nach Osten! and GDW published it in 1984 as Fire in the East.

In 1987, GDW released a sequel, Scorched Earth, that continued the Eastern Front conflict from May 1942 to 1944. At the 1988 Origins Awards, Scorched Earth won the award for Best Boardgame of 1987 Covering the Period 1900-1946.

In 1989, the new licensee for the Europa series (following the demise of GDW), Game Research/Design (GRD), published a further expansion for Fire in the East, entitled The Urals, with several additional maps expanding the play area to the titular mountains, additional charts, and a 1943 scenario designed by John Astell.

Following the demise of GRD, Historical Military Simulations (HMS) acquired a license to produce Europa games in 2004, and continued with the production of a new edition of Fire in the East, entitled Total War. To date, this has not been published, though the maps, counters, and game boxes have all been released to purchasers of the game who request them.

== Reception ==
Wargame Academy noted that the playing time was 40+ hours, and on a complexity scale of 1–10, was rated a 10. In an opinion comparing it to War in Europe (published by Simulations Publications Inc. in 1976), it said that Fire in the East was "more detailed than WIE [but] its playability is lessened."

== Other reviews ==
- Casus Belli #36 (Feb 1987)
- Fire & Movement #44 (Sept/Oct 1985)
- Casus Belli #58
