= Monster game =

Board games that are either very large, very complex or both

A monster game is a game, usually a wargame, that is either very large, very complex, or both. One criterion sometimes adopted is the number of pieces; a game which puts greater than 1000 counters into play at once may be considered to be a monster game. This classification can technically be applied to any board game, but most commonly refers to the kind of non-abstract wargames in which a large amount of time is needed to play each turn as a result of a relatively high commitment to period accurate military realism. Drang Nach Osten!, widely considered the first monster game, and its companion, Unentschieden, led to the creation of the Europa wargames, a series of connected wargames intended to cover combat over the entire European Theater of WWII.

Games that are considered monster games include:

Wargame	Company	Year	Counters	Playing time (hours)	Description
Drang nach Osten! (DNO)	GDW	1973	1,792	200	A game to cover Operation Barbarossa, the German invasion of Russia.
Europa series	GDW, GRD, Mill Creek Ventures and Historical Military Services (HMS)	1973-			A series containing 17 war games (the first being Drang nach Osten!), which can be combined, most games classified as monster games.
La Bataille de la Moscowa	GDW	1975	1,440	16	A simulation game of the Battle of Borodino. It is both complex and large.
War in Europe	SPI	1976	3,600	180	A simulation game of the war in Europe. This game is a combination of War in the East and War in the West with additional rules and mechanics.
Highway to the Reich	SPI	1976	2,400	6	The game is set during the Second World War, covering ten days of Operation Market-Garden, from 17 to 26 September 1944, with two hours per turn.
War Between the States 1861–1865	SPI	1977 (1st edition) 2004 (2nd edition)	1,400	6	A game that covers the entire American Civil War, the major theaters of operation from Galveston, Texas, to St. Joseph, Missouri, and from Philadelphia, Pennsylvania, to Jacksonville, Florida.
Empyrean Challenge	Superior Simulations	1978			A science fiction play-by-mail (PBM) game described by a reviewer in 1988 as "the most complex game system on Earth". Turn results sent from the company to the player could be up to 1,000 pages in length.
War in the Pacific	SPI	1978	3,200	6	A simulation game of the War in the Pacific with 7 maps.
The Longest Day	Avalon Hill	1979	2,603	90	Mammoth Operational wargame of the WWII Normandy Campaign, JUN-AUG 1944.
The Campaign for North Africa	SPI	1979	1,600	1,500	A game about the North African campaign of World War II.
Lords of the Earth	Thomas Harlan	1983		25 years	A PBM game involving expansion by conquest lasting about 25 years per game.
Pacific War	Victory Games/GMT Games	1985	> 2000	1–100	A grand strategy hex and counter WW 2 of the entire Pacific Theater of Operations.
The Great War in Europe	XTR Corp	1995	1,200	6	A simulation game of the first world war in Europe.
D.A.K.	The Gamers	1997	1,540	6	A game that covers the entire North African campaign at the regimental level
Case Blue	The Gamers	2007	3,500 (2,660 unit counters and 840 marker counters)	375	A game that covers both the Axis advance (between 1941 and 1942) as well as the Soviet counterattacks (Nov 42 to Jan 43) and the German counteroffensive at Kharkov (Feb-March 1943) including the Case Blue 1942 strategic summer offensive in southern Russia between 28 June and 24 November 1942, during World War II.

== See also ==
- List of board wargames
- List of wargame publishers
- Simulation game
- Tactical wargame
