= Quatre Bras: Stalemate on the Brussels Road =

Board wargame

Cover of folio edition, 1976

Quatre Bras: Stalemate on the Brussels Road is a board wargame published by Simulations Publications Inc. (SPI) in 1976 that simulates the Battle of Quatre Bras, one of the engagements leading to the Battle of Waterloo. Quatre Bras was originally published as one of four games in the popular collection Napoleon's Last Battles, but was also released as an individual game.

== Background ==
On 16 June 1815, the Anglo-Allies under Wellington were holding Quatre Bras, a strategic road intersection in Belgium. They were attacked by French forces under the command of Marshal Ney. This was a preliminary engagement that led to the Battle of Waterloo two days later.

== Description ==
Quatre Bras is a two-player board wargame where one player controls the Allied forces, and the other the French forces. Having a small 17" x 22" hex grid map, basic rules and only 100 counters, this game is relatively short and simple, where "players can usually discern the winner in one evening."

=== Gameplay ===
The rules are based on the system developed for Napoleon at Waterloo published by SPI in 1971, which uses a simple "I Go, You Go" system of alternating player turns:

- The French player moves all units desired, and engages in combat.
- The Allied player then has the same opportunity.

This completes one game turn, which represents 1 hour of game time. In addition, stacking of units is prohibited, and there are no supply rules. Zones of control are both "rigid" and "sticky": a unit moving adjacent to an enemy unit must stop there. Combat is mandatory, and units thus engaged cannot move away from each other except as a result of combat.

== Publication history ==
In 1975, SPI published the "quadrigame" Blue and Gray, which contained four different American Civil War games and one set of rules in the same box. The concept proved popular, and SPI quickly produced more. Napoleon's Last Battles, designed by Kevin Zucker and Jay Nelson, with cartography and graphic design by Redmond A. Simonsen, was published the following year and proved to be one of SPI's most popular quadrigames. One of the four games in the box was Quatre Bras, which was also released as an individual "folio game", packaged in a cardstock double LP-sized folder.

As related by Nick Palmer, Quatre Bras generated some controversy in the gaming community – in the game's "Designers' Notes", Zucker and Nelson decried rival games Waterloo by Avalon Hill and 1815 by Game Designers' Workshop for adding what they believed was a nonexistent hill to their maps of the Battle of Waterloo. GDW responded by issuing game errata for 1815 that doubled down on the hill, allowing Wellington's forces to shelter behind it. Palmer added, "The truth appears to be that there was a gentle slope, sufficient to offer some concealment."

After TSR took over SPI in 1982, they attempted to get a quick return on their money by republishing several popular SPI titles such Quatre Bras, which reappeared within a new edition of Napoleon's Last Battles.

In the 1990s, Decision Games acquired the rights to Quatre Bras and the other games in the original Napoleon's Last Battles collection, and republished all four games with revised and streamlined rules and new components.

== Reception ==
In Issue 14 of the British magazine Perfidious Albion, Steve Clifford called this "an interesting short game, with ,much of the onus on the French player ... Ney must win quickly, however, because of the strength of the Allied reinforcements."

In his 1977 book The Comprehensive Guide to Board Wargaming, Nicholas Palmer called Quatre Bras "A gripping battle for the crossroads, which swings dramatically to the French and back again." In his 1980 sequel, The Best of Board Wargaming , Palmer modified his opinion slightly, stating "Exciting, but not the sort of game you play a dozen times, since the course of play varies little." He concluded by giving the game an Excitement grade of 60%.

In Issue 53 of Moves, Ian Chadwick called Quatre Bras "short and sweet" and concluded by giving the game an "A" for playability, a "B+" for historical accuracy, and an "A" for component quality, saying, "A delight and a must in the collection of Napoleonic and tactical buffs."

In Issue 3 of the French games magazine Casus Belli, Jeran-Jacques Petit commented, "It is difficult for the French player to lose the Battle of Quatre Bras. The problem with wargames is that we have a general view of the battlefield and, moreover, we often know exactly where and when reinforcements are arriving. Ney hesitated and lost this battle because he thought for a moment that he was facing a superior force while the Allied reinforcements were arriving in dribs and drabs. As the game is presented, the French can beat the Allies as they come into play."

In a retrospective review twenty years after publication, Monte Gray felt that Quatre Bras tended to swing in France's favor due to defensive limits laid on the Allied commanders. Gray concluded on a positive note, saying, "Time has been kind to Kevin Zucker's design. It remains easy to learn, difficult to master."

== Other reviews and commentary ==
- Fire & Movement #6, #24, and Special Issue #1
- Paper Wars #26
- Simalcrum #20
- Strategy & Tactics #103
- The Wargamer Vol. 1, #4
- Games & Puzzles #64
