= 1976 Origins Award winners =

The following are the winners of the 3rd annual (1976) Origins Award, presented at Origins 1977:

== Charles Roberts Awards ==
Category	Winner	Company	Designer(s)
Best Strategic Game	The Russian Campaign	The Avalon Hill Game Company	John Edwards
Best Tactical Game	Terrible Swift Sword	SPI	Richard Berg
Best Graphics	Avalanche	GDW	Rich Banner
Best Professional Magazine	Strategy & Tactics	SPI	
Best Amateur Magazine	Jagdpanther/Battlefield		

== Adventure Gaming Hall of Fame Inductee ==
- Tom Shaw
