= Europa (wargame) =

Board wargame series

Europa is a series of board wargames planned to cover combat over the entire European Theater of World War II at a scale that represents units from divisions down to battalions and game turns that represent two weeks of time. The series was launched in 1973, and is still in production as of 2013, with over a dozen titles published and several more still in production or planning. Most of the titles qualify as "monster games", a subgenre of wargames featuring extensive orders of battle, a complex ruleset and usually a large game-map area with a detailed representation of the terrain they cover.

== Publishers and related publications ==
=== Games ===
The Europa series has been produced by four different publishers, as follows:

- Game Designers Workshop (GDW), 1973–1987
- Game Research/Design (GRD), 1989–2000
- Mill Creek Ventures, 2001–2003
- Historical Military Services (HMS), 2004–2025
- Europa Series Wargames Foundation (ESW), 2025-present

GRD began publishing play aids for Europa under a license from GDW, while GDW was still publishing the games. In 1989, they acquired use of the Europa trademark and began publishing the games, both new titles and "Deluxe Edition" revisions of previously published titles.

When GRD's Winston Hamilton died in March 2001, Mill Creek Ventures (principal owner Carl Kleihege) bought the rights and took over production of Europa. They continued using the terms "Game Research/Design", "GRD", and "GRD Games" alongside "Mill Creek Ventures" in their publications. They never published an actual Europa game, but they continued with the development of future releases and released several issues of The Europa Magazine.

In mid-2004, HMS bought the assets that formerly belonged to GRD, and thus took over production of the Europa series. HMS published the module Wavell's War in November 2005, and has released two issues of The Europa Magazine.

Under the terms of the agreement whereby GRD had obtained use of the Europa trademark, the intellectual property reverted to Rich Banner when Winston Hamilton died, so all Europa production by Mill Creek Ventures and HMS has been done under a license from Banner.

Per news in the Europe Series Wargames website, in late 2025 Rich Banner withdrew the license from HMS after many years with no new games, modules, scenarios, magazines, or website updates.

Per news in the Europe Series Wargames website, in early 2026 with Rich Banner's authorization the non-profit Europa Series Wargames Foundation was incorporated in Illinois to oversee Europa’s intellectual property through licensing and Fair Use policies in order to preserve, protect, and promote the Europa Series of historical wargames as both rigorous military simulations and deeply enjoyable recreational games for students and enthusiasts of military history. The Europa Series Wargames Foundation holds this body of work in trust for the gaming public and for future generations, with a commitment to stewardship rather than exploitation. The founding directors of the Foundation are Marc Miller, John Astell, and Bill Stone.

The changes in publishers have interfered with continuity in terms of publication schedules—only one new title has appeared since 1998—but there has been a great deal of continuity in terms of the people actually doing the development. For example, John Astell took over from Frank Chadwick as game designer for the series back when GDW was still publishing the series, and designed or co-designed several of the titles released by GRD. He appears not to be currently involved with HMS. Current HMS owners Gar Olmsted and Arthur Goodwin (and formerly Cory Manka, who left in the midst of a legal dispute) are also familiar names to long-time followers of the series, appearing in the credits of a number of the games and/or as authors in the official magazine of the series and fanzine publications.

GRD, Mill Creek, and HMS have also worked on newer game series covering the War in the Pacific (the Glory series) and World War I (the Great War series), which are somewhat similar to the Europa series, though not part of it.

In 2025, rights to the Europa trademark and copyrights of the individual games were withdrawn from HMS and assigned to the Europa Series Wargames Foundation with directors John M. Astell, Marc Miller, and Bill Stone. The Foundation now owns the registered trademark and copyrights and is the process of producing new and revised games in the Europa series.

=== Magazines and accessories ===
During 1976-1977, GDW published four issues of a flier called The Europa Newsletter. The fifth issue became a full-fledged magazine called The Grenadier, and expanded its coverage to GDW's other, non-Europa offerings as well.

In 1988, GRD revived The Europa Newsletter. Issue #5 saw the title changed to The Europa News (TEN), a somewhat more substantial magazine with a stiff glossy cover. Starting with issue No. 11, the title on the cover was changed to simply Europa, it was called The Europa Magazine (TEM), and it has continued under that name since then, and various subtitles have been in use over time as well, such as "The Europa Systems Magazine from GRD" (TESM) on the cover of #86 (with "HMS" substituted for "GRD" on the title page).. (As of July 2015, the most recent issue is #87, published in 2004. The repeated changes in publishers since 2000 have made the appearance of new issues somewhat erratic, but the magazine is still in existence.)

The magazine subscription is also a membership in The Europa Association, whose members also receive discounts on game orders and free copies of some of the "refit kit" materials or special maps. As with The Grenadier before it, The Europa Magazine also covers the publisher's other, non-Europa offerings. Unlike The Grenadier, however, it has not strayed far afield, and still focuses primarily on Europa.

Over the life of the series, a large number of official and unofficial play aids, rules variants, fanzines, and other Europa-related materials have been published. The most important of these was a fanzine entitled ETO: The New Europa Newsletter, which was published by Bill Stone and ran to 58 issues (excepting the unpublished issue number 57) during 1985-1990. Starting with issue #45 in 1989, the subtitle was changed to The Independent Europa Newsletter in response to GRD's acquisition of the trademark and publication rights for the system. This fanzine was an important focus for fans of the Europa system during the years when GDW was sidelining the system and it had not yet been turned over to GRD.

Currently, ESW has an official Europa website at EuropaSeries.com. The site has information about the availability of published games, the status of games in production, plans for future games in the series, downloadable errata sheets, and other material of interest to Europa players.

== East Front trilogy ==
The Europa series had its beginnings as a project by Paul Richard ("Rich") Banner, Frank Chadwick, and Marc Miller to produce a series of three wargames to cover the entire Eastern Front of the Second World War at the operational scale — that is, with more detail than a strategic simulation would provide, but less than a tactical simulation would merit. The trilogy was to include:

German	English	Description
Drang Nach Osten! (DNO)	Drive to the East	A game to cover Operation Barbarossa and the Soviet counterattacks during the winter of 1941-1942.
Unentschieden (UNT)	Stalemate	An expansion kit providing maps and orders of battle to allow for play of Drang nach Osten to continue until the end of 1944, if neither side had achieved victory before then.
Götterdämmerung	Twilight of the Gods	An expansion kit providing maps and orders of battle to allow for play of Drang nach Osten and Unentschieden to continue into 1945 if neither side had achieved victory before then.

The titles appealed to the historical Drang nach Osten and mythological Götterdämmerung concepts as symbols for the epic struggle between Nazi Germany and the Soviet Union.

Banner, Chadwick, and Miller founded Game Designers Workshop (GDW) initially to produce educational simulations for university classes. Drang nach Osten and Unentschieden were the company's first commercial releases. The game rules were a merger of Chadwick's earlier system for ground combat with Miller's earlier rules for science-fictional space combat adapted to represent World War II-era air combat (both had published earlier titles reflecting those interests). Banner served as art director for the project.

GDW released Drang nach Osten and Unentschieden in 1973. DNO was the first commercial "monster" board game. Due to an expanding range of interests that the developers wanted to pursue with their successful new company, Götterdämmerung was indefinitely postponed by GDW, and will never be published as originally conceived, due to a greatly revised plan for the series. The scope of the expanded series is covered more thoroughly below.

== Expansion from trilogy to Europa ==
The ostensible trilogy began its expansion to cover the entire European theater when the developers published a game on the German 1940 invasion of Norway, Narvik, in 1974. They then started working on a game to cover Germany's unplanned 1941 Balkans campaign to overthrow the governments of Yugoslavia and Greece, which some believe delayed the onset of Operation Barbarossa by several weeks and may have contributed to its failure. The game was finally published in 1979 as Marita-Merkur, named after German operations Marita and Merkur carried out during that campaign. However, it was published as a stand-alone game; by this time the Europa concept of covering the entire European theater had evolved, and the plan called for publishing a series of stand-alone games that provided Europa material, but concentrated on a single campaign and left most of the link-up issues to be addressed by future publications. The series also grew to cover such topics as the Spanish Civil War, which, though not strictly part of World War II, helped with the map coverage and provided a basis for what-if scenarios, had the various campaigns and battles of World War II gone differently in the games than the historical outcome.

The plans for the series evolved somewhat over the four decades of its existence, but can be approximated as follows. The various games traditionally been identified as "Europa Game X", where X is a Roman numeral. Since some of the games have been published under different names for their various editions, the list given here describes the subject matter for each game and breaks out the individual titles as bullets. Many titles have unofficial but commonly used acronyms, given in parentheses after the title. Acronyms for the games' publishers are given as well.

Several of the games listed here have had separately published "refit kits" for corrections and minor upgrades, and in some cases those have been included in later printings of the games. Their Finest Hour is the most extreme example of this, with both defective maps and numbers of counters needing to be reprinted. Some games have also been reprinted with new box art. Such details are not shown here.

Europa I - The German invasion of the USSR and the Soviet riposte, 1941-1942.

- Drang Nach Osten! (DNO), GDW 1973. Primarily used German sources for OB information, and had rudimentary maps (by later standards).
- Fire in the East (FitE), GDW 1984. OBs and maps were thoroughly revised, utilizing more recently published material on Soviet forces.
- Total War (TW), HMS/GRD (not yet published). The final revision for this title. Maps and counters were released to those purchasers who chose this option at the end of 2012.

Europa II - The Eastern Front, 1942–1944

- Unentschieden, GDW 1973. The name is German for Stalemate.
- Scorched Earth, (SE) GDW 1987.

Europa III - The Balkans Campaign, 1941.

- Marita-Merkur, (MM) GDW 1979.
- Balkan Front, (BF) GRD 1990.

Europa IV - The Norwegian campaign, 1940.

- Narvik, (Nar) GDW 1974.
- Storm Over Scandinavia (SoS) GRD 1998.

Europa V - The Battle of Britain and planned German invasion, 1940.

- Their Finest Hour (TFH), GDW 1976.

Europa VI - The Western Desert Campaign in North Africa, 1940-1942.

- Western Desert, (WD) GDW 1982.
- War in the Desert (WitD), GRD 1995. (see below)

Europa VII - The German invasion of Poland, 1939.

- Case White (CW), GDW 1977.
- First to Fight (FtF), GRD 1991.

Europa VIII - The Western Campaign in the Netherlands, Belgium, and France, 1940.

- The Fall of France (FoF), GDW 1981.

Europa IX - Operations in the Near East.

- The Near East (NE or TNE), GDW 1983.
- War in the Desert (WitD), GRD 1995. (see below)

Europa X - Potential involvement of Spain and Portugal in World War II, including the planned German assault on Gibraltar.

- Spain and Portugal (S&P), GDW 1984.
- For Whom the Bell Tolls (FWtBT), GR/D 1995. (Covers the Spanish Civil War as well.)

Europa XI - The Allied invasion of French North Africa, 1942-1943.

- Torch, GDW 1985.
- War in the Desert (WitD), GRD 1995. (see below)

Europa XII - The Allied invasion of France, 1944.

- Second Front (SF), GRD 1994.

Europa XIII - Expansion module giving a bigger picture of the Soviet war effort, plus updates and play aids for FitE/SE, and a scenario for the 1943 campaign.

- The Urals (TU), GRD 1989.

Europa XIV - The Winter War between Finland and the USSR, 1939-1940.

- A Winter War (WW or AWW), GRD 1992.

Material included in Balkan Front and First to Fight, published in 1990 and 1991 respectively, agreed with the above (excepting titles not yet released), and proposed the following extensions to wrap up the series, though none of them have been published:

Europa XV - The naval campaigns in the Mediterranean Sea and around the shores of Europe, 1939-1945.

- The Naval War

Europa XVI - Rules for integrating the individual games into a single game covering the entire war in the European theater, 1939-1945.

- Grand Europa

Europa XVII - Czechoslovakia fights rather than surrendering to appeasement in 1938.

- Peace in our Time

However, material included with War in the Desert, published in 1995, introduced substantial changes to the plan. It included all the material previously distributed over Europa VI/IX/XI in a single publication, now officially Europa VI but billed as "Europa VI/IX/XI" on the game box. It also offered the following changes to the earlier numbering scheme, though none of the proposed new material has been published:

Europa V (a combination of the earlier V & VIII)

- Blitzkrieg in the West

Europa VIII - The partisan/anti-partisan campaign in southeastern Europe, 1941-1945.

- Partisan War

Europa IX (previously XVII)

- Peace in our Time

Europa XI (previously XV)

- The Naval War

Europa XV (previously XVI)

- Grand Europa

Material included with Storm Over Scandinavia, published in 1998, retained the same scheme, but proposed some new titles:

- Total War would be a third edition of Europa I.
- Total Victory would be a third edition of Europa II, and would apparently also cover material originally planned for the unpublished Götterdämmerung.
- The proposed but unpublished Blitzkrieg in the West would be retitled Lightning War.

Much of this planning apparently became moot when GR/D's assets were picked up by Mill Creek Ventures in 2001. Work on a Europa-style game covering the campaign in East Africa had already been underway by a group calling itself "The East Africa Map Company", and it now became an official Europa project to be published as Wavell's War, covering all of World War II not only in East Africa, but in North Africa and the Mediterranean as well. It was offered for preorder in 2002, and was published in November 2005. No Europa series number has been announced for it. Mill Creek Ventures also continued development of Total War, the third edition of Europa I, and has offered it for preorder since 2003. The first components of this game (maps and counters) were released to purchasers at the end of 2012. Earlier in 2011, customers were given the opportunity to purchase additional unfolded maps from Total War. Although development of the series continues, no formal plan for its completion has been announced since the one given in Storm Over Scandinavia in 1998.

== Current status ==
The current status of the series can be seen at the publisher's Europa site, EuropaSeries.com. As of February 2013, the plan for Europa conforms approximately to the plan offered in 1998 (above), except that no Roman numerals are given for the games, and:

- Partisan War has been renamed PARTIZAN!
- Wavell's War published in 2005, joined the list, including coverage of the Italian campaign in East Africa and their defeat.
- The Eastern Front is once more planned as a trilogy, with Clash of Titans inserted between Total War and Total Victory, to cover the years 1943-1944.
- A new Ike's War is proposed as a module linking War in the Desert with Second Front.
- There is no mention of Peace in our Time, The Naval War, or "Grand Europa"

The changes to the 1998 plan indicate an assessment by the new publishers that the Europa system cannot be completed simply by publishing the three unpublished titles. Instead they propose that the modules Wavell's War and Ike's War be used as intermediate steps toward a completed system.

There was once a freely downloadable set of "Boot Camp Rules", a simplified ruleset to help people get started with the Europa system.

== Reviews ==
- Casus Belli #42 (Dec 1987)
