= Sky Galleons of Mars =

Board game

- Sky Galleons box cover Sky Galleons of Mars (1988) by Game Designers' Workshop
- Designers: Frank Chadwick, Marc W. Miller and Loren Wiseman
- Publishers: Game Designers' Workshop
- Publication: 1988
- Genres: Victorian Science Fiction
- Players: 2+
- Setup time: 10 minutes
- Playing time: 30–120 minutes
- Chance: Medium
- Age range: 10 and up
- Skills: Strategic thought

Sky Galleons of Mars is a board wargame designed by Frank Chadwick, Marc W. Miller and Loren Wiseman, published in 1988 by Game Designers' Workshop. It is set in an alternate Victorian Era where the major nations of Earth are extending their colonial interests on Mars (a barbarian, Edgar Rice Burroughs-style planet) and Venus (a primitive planet teeming with dinosaurs). The discovery of Liftwood, a Martian plant endowed with anti-gravity powers, allows the deployment of aerial fleets in the skies of the Red Planet.

The game won Origins Awards for Best Fantasy or Science Fiction Boardgame of 1988 and Best Graphic Presentation of a Boardgame of 1988, and was the inspiration for the role-playing game Space: 1889. It can be played on its own or used as the tactical ship combat system for Space: 1889.

== Gameplay ==
The game is played on a hexagonal mapboard that serves to regulate movement and combat. Each hex on the map represents 200 yards, each turn represents one-minute of time. A single plastic model represents an individual cloudship or aerial gunboat, though paper counters can also be used.

The rulebook is split into two main sections, Basic Rules and Advanced Rules. Basic is the game at its simplest form, with rules for moving, firing and taking damage. The Advanced section adds detailed rules for ramming and grappling, towing other vessels, crew small arms, crew quality, and more. The rest of the booklet includes seven scenarios along with rules for a campaign game.

During a battle, play proceeds through turns, each of which is broken down into three phases:

Initiative Phase: The players change crew assignments. If desired, boarding parties can be assembled or disbanded at this stage. Players also roll dice to determine who is the First Player that turn.

First Movement/Fire Phase: The First player moves all of his ships. Both players attack (taking into account range, weapon type, etc.). If damage is taken, it is resolved now.

Second Movement/Fire Phase: The second player moves all of his ships. Both players attack (taking into account range, weapon type, etc.). If damage is taken, it is resolved now.

== Components ==
- Rule Book
- Introduction to Space: 1889 (16pp)
- Ship Form Book (16pp)
- 2x Reference Folders
- 15 plastic Sky Galleons and Aerial Gunboats
- 4x dice
- 2x 22"x28" maps

== Reception ==
G.E. Smith reviewed Sky Galleons of Mars in Space Gamer/Fantasy Gamer No. 83. Smith commented that "Frank Chadwick, Marc Miller, Loren Wiseman, Timothy Brown and brad r hay [...] are to be congratulated for Sky Galleons of Mars [...] GDW has done about the best that they could do to make SGoM an easy-to-play stand alone game that gives its players full play value for their money."

Mike Siggins reviewed Sky Galleons of Mars for Games International magazine, and gave it 4 stars out of 5, and stated that "Overall, I enjoyed Sky Galleons and found the system fresh, quick and fun to play. As we are promised true sailing ships, ether flyers and even a set of land action rules in the future, I am looking forward to the next release with interest."

The game won Origins Awards for Best Fantasy or Science Fiction Boardgame of 1988 and Best Graphic Presentation of a Boardgame of 1988.

== Reviews ==
- Isaac Asimov's Science Fiction Magazine v13 n9 (1989 09)
- Best Games of 1988 in Games #94
- Casus Belli #50

== Supplements ==
=== Cloudships & Gunboats ===

Cloudships & Gunboats is a 1989 role-playing game supplement published by GDW for Space: 1889. Cloudships & Gunboats is a boxed supplement that deals with flying ships, containing a rule booklet that contains additional, optional rules for aerial combat, expanded ship design rules, and information on several ships from the Earth and Mars; also included are deck plans for the ships, a book of record forms for the ships, and 60 cardboard characters. Cloudships & Gunboats was reviewed in Space Gamer/Fantasy Gamer No. 88. The reviewer commented that "Cloudships & Gunboats is a nicely done supplement but it is not a necessity in the game. The deck plans and ship designs are the only real reason to buy this module. Cloudships & Gunboats contains a lot of flash, but very little substance."
