= Snapshot (board game) =

Science fiction tabletop wargame

Close Combat Aboard Starships in the Far Future
- Box cover by Jennell Jaquays (Note: Credited as Paul Jaquays.)
- Designers: Marc W. Miller
- Illustrators: Paul R. Banner; Richard Hentz
- Publishers: Game Designers' Workshop
- Publication: 1979; 47 years ago
- Genres: Science fiction Board wargame
- Series: Traveller boardgames

Snapshot is a 1979 board wargame, designed by Marc W. Miller, illustrated by Paul R. Banner and Richard Hentz, cover art by Jennell Jaquays, and published by Game Designers' Workshop. The original was republished in 2004 as part of Far Future Enterprises Traveller: The Classic Games, Games 1-6+.

== Gameplay ==
Snapshot is a game of starship boarding and personal combat derived from Traveller. Azhanti High Lightning is the third Traveller boardgame published by GDW. A second edition with new cover art by Chris White was published in 1983.

== Reception ==
Peter Darvill-Evans reviewed Snapshot for White Dwarf #16, giving it an overall rating of 8 out of 10, and stated that "it is an invaluable adjunct to Traveller, allowing close combat to be resolved in detail, yet quickly and simply; as a game in itself it is perhaps less satisfactory, although still one of the best man-to-man combat systems on the market; and the presentation is in every way excellent."

Eric Goldberg reviewed Snapshot in Ares Magazine #1, rating it a 5 out of 9. Goldberg commented that "Slightly more complicated than necessary, but fairly playable. Adventurers can take half an hour or an afternoon."

Tony Watson reviewed Snapshot in The Space Gamer No. 27. Watson commented that "While Snapshot is a solid game in its own right, I think it truly realizes its potential when used with Traveller. Players must consider character survival more carefully and think of goals and ambitions beyond the immediate combat."

== See also ==
Traveller boardgames
