= Soldier's Companion =

Soldier's Companion is a 1989 role-playing game supplement for Space: 1889 published by Game Designers' Workshop.

== Contents ==
Soldier's Companion is a supplement in which massed land combat is covered, both on Earth and the planets.

== Publication history ==
Soldier's Companion was written by Frank Chadwick, with a cover by Richard Hasenauer, and was published by Game Designers' Workshop in 1989 as a 196-page book.

== Reception ==
Mike Siggins reviewed Soldier's Companion for Games International magazine, and gave it 3 stars out of 5, and stated that "Overall, the Soldier's Companion is a useful purchase only if you are likely to need these rules or are looking for a new historical set. It offers little else if you already have the rolegame and modules. This is sad because it could have been an excellent product if the balance of material were better."

== Reviews ==
- Casus Belli #53
