= Tales From The Ether =

Science fiction role-playing game

Cover art by David R. Deitrick

Tales From The Ether is a collection of short role-playing game adventures published by Game Designers' Workshop (GDW) in 1989 for the steampunk role-playing game Space: 1889.

== Description ==
Tales From The Ether is a collection of five adventure scenarios featuring locations on the Moon, the planets Mercury, Venus, and Mars, and the orbiting British heliograph-signalling station Harbinger. With a steampunk setting in 1889, these adventures combine 19th-century steam-era technology with a planetary system based on a Victorian astronomical understanding of the Solar System similar to that displayed by Edgar Rice Burroughs in his Barsoom stories, featuring a solar system filled with aether, and with breathable atmospheres on all of the planets.

The five scenarios are:

1. "The Burning Desert": The characters travel to Mercury to help in an investigation.
2. "Drums Along the Border": The characters must thwart a plot hatched against English interests on Venus.
3. "River of Life": A sequel to a scenario in the Space 1889 manual set on the Moon.
4. "Anarchy in the Ether": The characters must thwart an anarchist plot to destroy the orbiting heliographic station that allows the Earth to communicate with Mars by means of light signals.
5. Ausonian Stalker: The characters must search for a serial killer in a Martian city.

== Publication history ==
The science fiction role-playing game Space: 1889 published by GDW in 1989 was, according to game historian Shannon Appelcline, the first role-playing game to feature space colonization using steam technology in the style of Jules Verne, H.G. Wells, and Arthur Conan Doyle in what would later be called steampunk. GDW immediately followed this with the supplement Tales From The Ether, a 64-page collection of short adventures written by Frank Chadwick with Marc W. Miller, Loren K. Wiseman, Tim Ryan, and Lester W. Smith, with cover art by David R. Deitrick, and interior art by Rick Harris and Paul Herbert.

GDW followed this in 1990 with More Tales from the Ether, a collection of four more adventures all set on Mars.

== Reception ==
In Issue 5 of the British magazine Games International, Paul Mason felt that "Tales from the Ether is a standing still product. It will satisfy those who were sold on the Space: 1889 concept but who lack the imagination to design their own adventures. What it doesn't do is add anything truly creative to the game, or provide much in the way of inspiration for more imaginative referees." Mason concluded by giving the product a poor rating of 2 out of 5, stating "Still, it's good value for money."

In his 1990 book The Complete Guide to Role-Playing Games, game critic Rick Swan highly recommended Tales from the Ether, calling it "a superb anthology of short adventures, a great introduction to the game [Space: 1889]." Swan suggested players should "try the 'Burning Desert' scenario first, an exciting visit to the tin mines of Mercury."

In Issue 19 of Diary of the Doctor Who Role-Playing Games, Michel Albert suggested that Tales from the Ether could be adapted to the Doctor Who Roleplaying Game, but admitted that the Victorian understanding of astronomy used in the Space: 1889 setting would possibly require "staging them elsewhere and elsehwen, [removing] the need for a lot of suspension of disbelief about breathable atmospheres and such."
