= Conklin's Atlas of the Worlds =

1989 role-playing game supplement

Conklin's Atlas of the Worlds and Handy Manual of Useful Information
- Cover art by Shea Ryan
- Designers: Frank Chadwick
- Publishers: Game Designers' Workshop
- Publication: 1989; 37 years ago
- Genres: Steampunk

Conklin's Atlas of the Worlds and Handy Manual of Useful Information is a supplement published by Game Designers' Workshop in 1989 for the steampunk role-playing game Space: 1889.

== Contents ==
Conklin's Atlas of the Worlds is a supplement that provides:

- a page of rules for space naval combat
- recent history of the past decade on Earth, with a few events on Mars and Venus
- maps and other information about Earth, Mars, Venus, Mercury, the Moon (Luna) and the lost continent of Atlantis. The book also provides details of railroads and airship lines on Earth, and current national borders.

== Publication history ==
GDW published the steampunk role-playing game Space: 1889 in 1989 and quickly provided several supplements, including Conklin's Atlas of the Worlds and Handy Manual of Useful Information, an 80-page softcover book written by Frank Chadwick, with cover art by Shea Ryan and interior art by Tim Bradstreet and Angela Bostick.

However, Space: 1889 did not fare well against rival steampunk game Spelljammer, which had been published by TSR the same year, and GDW cancelled Space: 1889 and all its supplements a year later in 1990, as a commercial failure.

== Reception ==
In Issue 7 of the British magazine Games International, Paul Mason stated that "Conklin's is far better than Tales from the Ether, and is well worth getting if you are running a Space: 1889 campaign. However, I still feel that the game is too much facts, and not enough flair." Mason concluded by giving this book a rating of 3 out of 5.

In Issue 53 of the French games magazine Casus Belli, Pierre Lejoyeux noted that previous material for Space: 1889 had left vast gaps in the description of the Solar System. Lejoyeux felt that although this supplement provided some information, he was disappointed in its lack of balance, commenting, "The supplement Conklin's Atlas of the Worlds partly fills this gap with regard to Venus. Mars is not so lucky, yet it is the most attractive planet!"

In Issue 74 of Polyhedron, Timothy Brown suggested that gamemasters running a Spelljammer campaign could switch their campaign over to the Space: 1889 campaign setting, which Brown though was superior. Brown suggested the material in Conklin's Atlas would be valuable, but warned, "Read the boxed set carefully — Victorian scholars might show great interest in AD&D game characters and creatures, but panic may easily engulf the common folk."

== Reviews ==
- Papyrus (Issue 9 - 1993)
