= The Fall of France (wargame) =

1981 WWII board wargame

- Cover art by Rodger B. MacGowan
- Designers: John Astell
- Illustrators: Rodger B. MacGowan
- Publishers: Game Designers' Workshop
- Publication: 1981
- Genres: WWII

The Fall of France, subtitled "The Campaign in France, 1940", is a board wargame published by Game Designers' Workshop (GDW) in 1981 that simulates the 1940 German invasion of France during World War II. This was the eighth game in GDW's Europa series.

== Background ==
Although France and Germany had declared war in 1939, the two sides did not engage in conflict for the remainder of the year and the first four months of 1940, prompting newspapers to call it the "Phony War". Following the First World War, the French General Staff had ruled out the idea of a future German thrust through the Ardennes–Sedan sector, certain that such rough terrain with such a limited road network could not be crossed by tanks. They also believed Germany would respect the neutrality of Belgium and the Netherlands. For that reason, France was content to wait behind the heavily fortified Maginot Line that ran along the French-German border south of the Ardennes Forest, believing that German would be forced to advance through that sector. On 13 May 1940, Germany confounded French expectations by striking through the weakly defended Ardennes, bypassing the Maginot Line and driving a wedge between French and British forces.

== Description ==
The Fall of France is a board wargame for two players or teams, one of whom controls the German invaders, while the other controls the Allied defenders.

Like all maps of the Europa series, the two 21" x 28" hex grid maps are scaled at 25 kilometres (16 mi) per hex. The game includes over 2000 double-sided die-cut counters and several loose-leaf booklets of rules.

=== Gameplay ===
The gameplay sequence used by all games of the Europa series is a system taken from Kursk: Operation Zitadelle (SPI, 1971) that emphasizes exploitation by mechanized armor following regular movement and combat. Play alternates between each player (or team) and follows this sequence:

1. Supply Determination Phase
2. Ground Movement Phase
3. Air Phase
4. Ground Combat Phase
5. Mechanized Exploitation Movement Phase

Once both players or teams have completed this sequence, it is the end of one turn, which represents two weeks of game play. The game lasts for ten turns.

During the first turn of the "Historical Scenario" the movement of some German, French, and British units is restricted and there is no Mechanized Exploitation Movement Phase.

=== Scenarios ===
The game comes with two scenarios:

- "Historical Scenario": This is the standard game, where set up and player objectives are based on the historical battle for France.
- "1940 Campaign Scenario": This non-historical scenario allows both players or teams to set-up their forces as they wish.

The game also includes information on belligerent and neutral armies of the time, as well as reinforcement and mobilizations rates, which allows players to design their own "what-if" hypothetical scenarios.

In Europa X: Spain and Portugal (1984), rules were included for a scenario titled "Battle for Spain" (a hypothetical invasion of Spain by Germany); this required components from both Spain and Portugal as well as The Fall of France.

== Publication history ==
In 1973, GDW published Drang Nach Osten!, the first in the Europa series of "monster" wargames (games that have over 1000 counters) that would share a common set of rules and interwoven maps. GDW's plan was that eventually the Europa series would cover every campaign of the war's European theatre. The eighth game in this series was The Fall of France, designed by John Astell and released in 1981 with cover art by Rodger B. MacGowan.

In 1984, GDW published a second edition. The same year, Hobby Japan published a Japanese-language edition.

== Reception ==
In Issue 50 of the British wargaming magazine Perfidious Albion, Charles Vasey noted the thousands of counters, writing "Aaaargh! More counters than you can shake a stick at covering the surface of the map to vast heights. The only game where you can lose a division under a company of bicycle troops." Vasey questioned the playability of the monster game, commenting, "The research is awesome, the back-up is impressive, but Orville - does it fly?"

In Berg's Review of Games, George Pearson was not impressed, writing, "GDW's Fall of France is Europa at its worst: the time scale is all wrong, and the effects of the blitz are crudely rendered."

== Other recognition ==
A copy of The Fall of France is held in the collection of the Strong National Museum of Play (object 117.101).

== Other reviews and commentary ==
- Campaign #83
- Fire & Movement #26 and #65
- The Grenadier #14
- Panzerfaust #54
- Strategy & Tactics #27
- Nuts & Bolts #13 and #14
