= Azhanti High Lightning =

Board wargame published in 1980

Adventure Aboard an Imperial Starship
- Box cover by Richard Flory
- Designers: Frank Chadwick; Marc W. Miller
- Illustrators: Paul R. Banner; Charmaine Geist; Richard Hentz; Richard Flory
- Publishers: Game Designers' Workshop
- Publication: 1981; 45 years ago
- Genres: Board wargame
- Series: Traveller boardgames

Azhanti High Lightning is a science-fiction wargame, designed by Frank Chadwick and Marc W. Miller, illustrated by Paul R. Banner, Charmaine Geist, Richard Hentz, and Richard Flory, and published by Game Designers Workshop (GDW) in 1980. The title is the name of the large military starship that provides the setting for close-action combat between individuals on board. Azhanti High Lightning is the fourth Traveller boardgame published by GDW. It was republished in 2004 as part of Far Future Enterprises's (FFE) Traveller: The Classic Games, Games 1-6+. Originally Supplement 5: Lightning Class Cruisers was only available as part of this game, it was republished in 2000 as part of FFE's Traveller Supplements volume.

== Gameplay ==
The game, designed by Frank Chadwick and Marc Miller, is a combat game set in the Traveller universe, and was developed from Snapshot, a game of starship boarding and room-to-room fighting. It depicts close-action combat between individuals on board the Azhanti High Lightning, a large military starship.

Each turn, representing 15 seconds, is subdivided into six phases. In the first phase, players secretly write orders for each counter, each of which has a six points to expend on actions during the remaining five action phases. Combat is divided into hand-to-hand fighting and rifle fire. The game provides six scenarios — violent boarding, stealthy boarding, theft from the holds, salvage, mutiny and escape from the brig — along with suggestions for designing further scenarios.

The game comes with a rulebook; fourteen 14" x 22" full-color maps representing the various decks of the ship, with each square representing 1.5 metres; Traveller Supplement 5: Lightning Class Cruisers that supplements the maps; and 240 die-cut counters representing individuals, robots and aliens.

== Reception ==
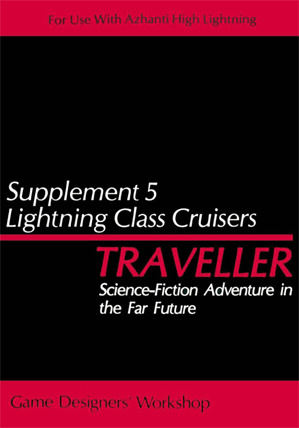
The game contained Traveller Supplement 5: Lightning Class Cruisers

In the October 1980 edition of The Space Gamer (Issue No. 32), William A. Barton commented that in spite of its flaws, "Azhanti High Lightning still rates high in quality - far above the releases of a lot of other companies. It stands as a welcome addition to the Traveller family of games and deserves a place on the shelf of any science fiction gamer who enjoys a well-designed game that offers both complexity and playability. Designers Marc Miller and Frank Chadwick deserve a hefty round of applause for this offering. One wonders what they'll come up with next. All I can say is, after Azhanti High Lightning, Traveller game 4 is going to have to be a real planet-buster to compete."

In the October–November 1980 edition of White Dwarf (Issue No. 21), Andy Slack thought the game to be a very good and needed addition to the Traveller game system: "My only criticism of the game is the price; this is a bit on the high side... Overall, however, a thorough and excellent game."

In the November 1980 edition of Dragon (Issue 43), Roberto Camino found the production values to be excellent, especially the maps of the decks, and the "prodigious amount of additional background material" in the supplementary booklet.

In the January 1981 edition of Ares (Issue 6), Eric Goldberg liked the combat system, but since it was supposed to be a stand-alone board game separate from the Traveller role-playing system, he disagreed with the inclusion of the technical manual, which he said would be "useful only to the Traveller aficianado" and would be "no more than a curiosity for the purchaser who does not eat, sleep and breathe the parent game." Although he felt the game was good, with "a unique flavor which allows the players to feel they are fighting across the decks of a gigantic spaceship", Goldberg concluded "The package is also, because of the supplementary material, too expensive. Unless the reader is interested in the Traveller universe, he is paying a good deal of the purchase price for something of little or no value to him."

Michael Blum reviewed Azhanti High Lightning for Different Worlds magazine and stated that "for the Game Master who cares to come up with a damage comparison system, blade weapon adjustments to the sketchy melee system, and animal ratings, this system can prove to be an interesting alternative to standard Traveller; and, of course, Azhanti High Lightning can still be played for its own considerable enjoyment."

In a retrospective review in Issue 11 of Simulacrum, Luc Olivier commented, "All in all, AHL is an interesting game to play if you like Science Fiction and role-playing games." Olivier concluded, "Of course, some mechanisms are outdated and could be updated to reflect current standards, but wandering across some beautifully drawn ship plans and zapping all over the place is quite fun."

== Reviews ==
- Polyhedron #75
- Analog Science Fiction and Fact

== Awards ==
Azhanti High Lightning was awarded the Charles S. Roberts Award for "Best Fantasy or Science Fiction Game of 1980".

== See also ==
- Galac-Tac
- Starweb
- Traveller boardgames
