= Eylau =

Eylau can refer to:

- Battle of Eylau during the Napoleonic Wars in 1807
- Eylau (wargame), a 1980 board wargame that simulates the 1807 battle
- Bagrationovsk (Preußisch Eylau) in Russia, until 1945 in East Prussia, Germany
- Eylau, Texas
- Iława (Deutsch Eylau) in Poland, until 1945 in West Prussia, Germany
- French ship Eylau (1856)
