= Eylau (wargame) =

1980 Napoleonic board wargame

- Designers: John Astell, Frank Chadwick, Rik Fontana
- Illustrators: Rich Banner, Richard Hentz
- Publishers: Game Designers' Workshop
- Publication: 1980
- Genres: Napoleonic

Eylau, subtitled "Napoleon's Winter Battle, 1807", is a Napoleonic board wargame published by Game Designers' Workshop (GDW) in 1980 that simulates the Battle of Eylau.

== Background ==
During the War of the Fourth Coalition in the fall of 1806, Napoleon smashed the Prussian army at the Battle of Jena-Auerstadt, and spent the remainder of the year pursuing the scattered Prussians. In January 1807, the Russian Imperial Army under the command of General Levin August von Bennigsen took advantage of Napoleon's preoccupation to push west across Prussia. Napoleon reacted by moving to the north, hoping to prevent their retreat back to Russia. After Bennigsen's Cossacks captured a copy of Napoleon's orders, Bennigsen rapidly withdrew to the northeast to avoid being cut off. The French army of 45,000 pursued for several days and on 7 January 1807, they found 60,000 Russians drawn up for battle at the town of Eylau.

== Description ==
Eylau is a board wargame for 2–4 players in which one player or team controls French forces and the other player or team controls Russian forces.

=== Components ===
The game comes with a 22" x 34" hex grid map scaled at 150 yards (140 m) per hex that is predominantly white (snow), displaying towns, woods, marshes, lakes, streams and slopes. The game also includes 240 counters and an eight-page rulebook.

=== Gameplay ===
Setup is semi-free: players can place leaders and their units anywhere within a certain radius of a specified hex. Play alternates between each side, with each player/team given the opportunity in turn to reorganize, move and fire. Zones of control are locking (units must stop once they have entered an enemy unit's zone of control); but cavalry units ignore zones of control, and heavy snow removes zones of control. Combat is mandatory for opposing units that are adjacent. Only two half-strength counters can be stacked; full-strength counters must stand alone (except that leaders can be stacked.)

Units cannot move or engage the enemy unless they are within range of an active leader. Leaders also enable eliminated units to be reorganized, returning to the board as half-strength units. Although the Russians have numerical superiority, they are placed under severe leadership restrictions: In Turns 1 and 2, the Russians can only use one leader; this increases to four by Turn 6.

Special rules cover Russian routs, weather and darkness, and Cossack unreliability, as well as allowing the cavalry of Joachim Murat to charge the Russians with a special attack bonus for three turns.

=== Victory conditions ===
Victory is determined by the player or team who has earned the most victory points. These are gained by capturing towns, eliminating French leaders, and demoralizing enemy formations. Eliminating Napoleon is an instant Russian win, regardless of victory points.

== Publication history ==
In 1980, John Astell, Frank Chadwick, and Rik Fontana designed Eylau, which was published by GDW in 1980 with artwork by Rich Banner and Richard Hentz.

== Reception ==
In Issue 49 of the British wargaming magazine Perfidious Albion, Charles Vasey called this game "Borodino with a high degree of polish." Vasey noted "Divisional morale is the feature they really work on, but there is also a distant bombardment table to encourage those grand Napoleonic cannonades." Vasey concluded, "The game demonstrates that GDW can do the mainstream games with style as well as being innovative."

In Issue 101 of Campaign, John D. Burtt noted that "Eylau is advertised as moderately complex, a basic game designed for beginning players. In this I think they only partially successful, releasing a game that will fall beyond the interest of the beginner and below the interest of the experienced Napoleonic gamer." Burtt found the components "ordinary" and the rules for movement and combat "will seem very familiar" to anyone with experience playing the "quadrigames" from Simulations Publications Inc. Burtt did have issues with the actual choice of battle, commenting, "It is simply too frustrating to see the Russians sit there with their numerical advantage on the map and have command restrictions keep them from taking the initiative." Burtt also felt the game, with 240 counters, was too large, writing, "A beginner can get bogged down by the size and lose the fun." Burtt thought that the "semi-free" setup was overwhelming for the beginner, and suggested that a fixed setup would have been better, with semi-free setup offered as an option. Burtt concluded, "The bottom line is a question mark. This is a sound design that feels like it's being misused. It will make a great play-by-mail game, but has little else to really recommend it. Eylau sells for $9.98, but I would suggest looking it over before you buy."
