= Case White =

Case White may refer to:

- Fall Weiss, the 1939 German invasion of Poland
- Case White: The Invasion of Poland, 1939, board wargame
- a mistranslation of Operation Weiss, a 1943 Axis operation against the Yugoslav Partisans throughout occupied Yugoslavia, ending in the Battle of the Neretva
