= Unentschieden =

Board wargame published in 1973

Cover art by Don Lowry, 1973

Unentschieden (German for "Stalemate") is a board wargame published by Game Designers' Workshop (GDW) in 1973 that simulates combat on the Eastern Front during World War II. The game is an expansion of GDW's popular "monster" wargame Drang Nach Osten!, and was the second game in the Europa series that was planned to eventually cover all operations in the European Theatre.

== Contents ==
Unentschieden, characterized as a "monster game" because it has more than 1000 counters, is a two-player (or two-team) game that covers operations on the Eastern Front from April 1942 to December 1944.

=== Components ===
A copy of Drang Nach Osten! is required to play this game, which uses the 1800 counters and four maps from Drang Nach Osten!, and adds another 2100 counters and four more maps. The combined maps of both games cover the entire Eastern Front at a scale of 25 km per hex.

== Publication history ==
Drang Nach Osten!, designed by Rich Banner and Frank Chadwick and published by GDW in 1973 as its first commercial release, covered Germany's surprise invasion of the Soviet Union, Operation Barbarossa from September 1941 to March 1942. It was the first in an ambitious project to create a series of twenty wargames called Europa that would use the same rules system and the same map scale. When finished, the maps of the series, when placed edge to edge, would cover the entire European theatre, and the games would cover every European operation. Unentschieden, also known as Europa II, was GDW's second release, published in 1973 with cover art by Don Lowry. Unlike subsequent games in the Europa series, it was not a standalone game but was designed as an expansion to Drang Nach Osten!

In 1984, GDW revised and republished Drang Nach Osten! as Fire in the East, and followed this in 1987 with a revision of Unentschieden titled Scorched Earth.

In 1989, following the demise of GDW, the new licensee for the Europa series, Game Research/Design (GRD), added another expansion to Fire in the East/Scorched Earth titled The Urals.

== Awards ==
At the 1988 Origins Awards, Scorched Earth won the award for Best Boardgame of 1987 Covering the Period 1900-1946.

== Reception ==
In a 1976 poll conducted by Simulations Publications Inc. to determine the most popular wargames in North America, the combination of Drang nach Osten! and Unentschieden was rated Number 1 out of 202 games.

In his 1977 book The Comprehensive Guide to Board Wargaming, Nick Palmer commented "There is a school of thought which holds that the Europa series is for admiring and revelling in the rules rather than playing, but it is playable."

In the 1980 book The Complete Book of Wargames, game designer Jon Freeman noted the immense size of the two games when combined, saying, "This is monster-game territory! There are eight maps that when placed together, will take about two pool tables to support." Freeman pointed out "Even GDW's excellent staff admits the order-of-battle work is weak compared to today's state of the art." He questioned game balance, saying the game favored the German side, and warned that the game was only playable by large groups of players with plenty of time on their hands. For the resultant lack of playability, Freeman refused to give this game an Overall Evaluation, saying it was too large, too long and too complex, rating it "Not for public consumption."

In a review published in 1980, Steve List commented, "DNO/Unentschieden is not exactly a way of life, but it is a big game. Despite its age, it is far from obsolete, and it is decked with plenty of color (or chrome, if you will)." List concluded by giving the combination of games a grade of "B+", saying, ":No collection of east front multi-map monster games would be complete without it."

In The Guide to Simulations/Games for Education and Training, Martin Campion noted, "This set [of two games] shows a lot about the war but at a terrific cost in time and trouble."

== Reviews ==
- Panzerfaust #64
