= En Garde! (role-playing game) =

Tabletop role-playing game

- Fourth edition cover by Lee Brimmicombe-Wood
- Designers: Frank Chadwick; Daryl Hany; John Harshman; Loren Wiseman
- Publishers: Games Designers’ Workshop, Margam Evans Limited
- Publication: 1975 (1st edition); 1977 (2nd edition); 1988 (3rd edition); 2005 (4th edition)
- Genres: Historical
- Systems: Custom
- Website: www.engarde.co.uk/index.html

En Garde! is a hybrid role-playing and tactical dueling game published by Game Designers' Workshop (GDW) in 1975 that simulates the swashbuckling world of the Three Musketeers and Cyrano de Bergerac in 17th century Paris.

== Publication history ==
En Garde! was GDW's first entry into the role-playing game field, a game designed by Darryl Hany, Frank Chadwick and Paul Evans and published as a 48-page digest-sized book in 1975. Chadwick especially wanted this swashbuckling game to be a hybrid of role-playing game and strategy game. David M. Ewalt, in his book Of Dice and Men, pointed out that the game, published only a year after TSR's Dungeons & Dragons, was one of D&D's first early competing products.

A revised second edition was published in 1977, but the game failed to gain an audience. As David Ewalt noted, "Players responded to the Three Musketeers-style setting, but they didn't care for the rules."

Theo Clarke and Evans ran a game for over 20 players at the UK Gamesfair in 1983. Evans then wrote a BASIC computer program to administer a PBM game and they ran increasingly large games at successive games fairs. Evans started a PBM game using the same computer programs in 1986 in a new magazine called Small Furry Creatures Press, which he co-published with Clarke. Evans continues to run this game as Les Petites Bêtes Soyeuses. The success of the game also led to an annual convention which ran for over ten years.

Clarke and Evans found a demand for the rule book arising from their games and other postal games. Under the name SFC Press they intended to publish a new edition of the game under license from Chadwick. When SFC Press was liquidated in 2003 the rights to the game were acquired by Evans personally. Evans' company Margam Evans produced a new edition, the 4th, of the game.

Although the 1987 Swedish product En Garde! by Ragnarök Speldesign is also a role-playing game set in seventeenth-century France that emphasizes fencing, it has no connection to this game.

=== Play-by-mail version ===
En Garde transitioned well to a play-by-mail game (PBM) format. Its first appearance in this form may have been in the late 1970s through the fanzine Chimera. By the early 1980s, the game had fully emerged in PBM with numerous games active. By 2001, the game was still running in PBM and PBeM formats.

== Reception ==
In Issue 55 of the UK magazine Games & Puzzles (December 1976), Charles Vasey noted that GDW "have picked a really splendid period for the new duelling game." However, Vasey questioned the game system, saying, "Despite its complexity, the system does not play as well as one might think. Often duels end very swiftly." He concluded, "It is complex and convoluted, and it feels like real life. Players will soon find they have natural enemies and rivals who must be crushed directly or by a hired blade. One must seek to be in the best set, but beware bankruptcy or it's the frontier regiment and disgrace until you pay off your debts."

In the inaugural issue of Games International, Richard Ashley reviewed the republished edition by Small Furry Creatures Press, and was impressed by its improved layout, as well as the new chapter on postal play. He concluded by giving this game an above-average rating of 4 out of 5, saying, "This new edition retains all the old rules with a superior presentation."

In the July 1980 issue of Fantastic Science Fiction, game designer Greg Costikyan called En Garde! "the first well-written set of role-playing rules.... En Garde! was the first role-playing game by a major company and by established designers; and, as one might expect, it set new standards for role-playing rules — standards to which few subsequent games have risen."

In the 1979 book The Playboy Winner's Guide to Board Games, John Jackson noted that "There is a minimum of player interaction; play is geared toward individual deeds rather than group action." Jackson liked the clarity of the rules, commenting, "Although lacking neither color nor detail, the rules to En Garde! are clear and comprehensible." Jackson concluded, "If it lacks the scope of true fantasy role-playing games, it's not as time-consuming, either, and it appears to be a pleasant diversion."

In the 1980 book The Complete Book of Wargames, game designer Jon Freeman thought "the game's limited scope (no monsters, no magic, no hoards of treasure) will keep it from challenging Dungeons & Dragons, but it makes a delightful change of pace." Freeman concluded by giving the game an Overall Evaluation of "Good", saying, "except for Melee and Wizards, it's the only RPG you could imagine running concurrently with your major campaign on, say, alternate Tuesdays."

In The Guide to Simulations/Games for Education and Training, Martin Campion called the game "a tongue-in-cheek simulation of the kind of life lived in The Three Musketeers and other historical adventures." Campion emphasized the open-ended nature of the game by concluding "No criteria for ending the game are included in the rules."

In his 1990 book The Complete Guide to Role-Playing Games, game critic Rick Swan called this "an out of print classic that's worth the search." He also noted "What makes it special is the inventive tactical combat system, perhaps the best fencing simulation ever to grace an RPG." Swan concluded by giving the game a rating of 3 out of 4, saying, "A simple, delightfully tongue-in-cheek game."

== See also ==
- List of play-by-mail games
