= Space: 1889 =

Steampunk tabletop role-playing game

- Cover by David Dietrick
- Designers: Frank Chadwick
- Publishers: Game Designers' Workshop; Heliograph, Inc.; Clockwork Publishing; Ulisses North America
- Publication: 1988, 2001, 2014
- Genres: Steampunk; Victorian era; science fantasy
- Systems: GDW Task system, Ubiquity
- ISBN: 0-943580-80-3

Space: 1889 is a tabletop role-playing game of Victorian-era space-faring, created by Frank Chadwick and originally published by Game Designers' Workshop (GDW) from 1989 to 1990. It was the first roleplaying game to feature space colonization using steam technology in the style of Jules Verne, H. G. Wells, and Arthur Conan Doyle in what would later be called steampunk. The setting of Space: 1889 has not only produced roleplaying games, but board games, books, miniatures and a computer game.

== Publication history ==
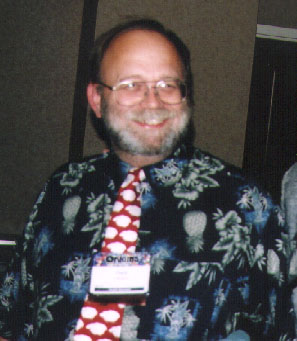
Frank Chadwick designed Space: 1889.

The first published description of Space: 1889 was in the "Feedback" column in the Ares Magazine in 1983, as a proposal for a board wargame.

GDW initially published the game in 1989, cancelling it a year later in 1990, as a commercial failure. Along with the RPG, a Space: 1889 computer game was produced in 1990 by Paragon. On the closures of GDW in 1995, the rights returned to Chadwick, with Heliograph, Inc. acquiring a reprint licence in 2000 and 2001.

In 2010, the Pinnacle Entertainment Group published a Savage Worlds edition of the game called Space 1889: Red Sands.

In February 2013 Chronicle City announced that it was working with the German publisher Uhrwerk Verlag/Clockwork Publishing on a new English edition of Space: 1889, which is based on the German edition from 2011 which uses the Ubiquity ruleset. In December 2014 Uhrwerk Verlag cut their ties with Chronicle City and continued the translation of the new English edition on their own. The PDF of the English Ubiquity core rulebook was released in October 2014, the print edition in November 2015.

In September 2019, after the announcement of bankruptcy by Clockwork Publishing earlier that year, Ulisses North America announced that it had acquired the rights to Space: 1889. Under license in December 2023, Strange Owl Games successfully crowdfunded Space: 1889 After, which is set ten years after 1899 and has two different sets of rules: Dungeons & Dragons 5th edition and a new system called Empyrean.

== Setting ==
The game presents an alternate history in which certain discredited Victorian scientific theories were instead found to be true and have led to the existence of new technologies. In the setting, Thomas Edison invented an "ether propeller" that could propel ships through the "luminiferous aether" (the universal medium that permeates space, based on a now outdated scientific theory), and he traveled to Mars in 1870, accompanied by Scottish soldier of fortune Jack Armstrong, where they discovered that the planet was inhabited. By the time of the game's setting in 1889, the great powers have used Edison's invention to extend their colonies and interests to the inner planets of the Solar System. Venus and Mars have been colonized by the United Kingdom, Germany, France, and Russia. Belgium has only colonized Mars and Italy has only colonized Venus whilst Japan and the United States maintain economic and scientific enclaves on Mars. There are no colonies or bases on the Moon. Only the United Kingdom maintains a (scientific) base on Mercury.

The inner planets reflect an evolutionary progression, the planets nearest to the Sun being younger than those farther out. All planets have extraterrestrial life and most bear native sentient species. Mercury is primeval and tide locked and possesses apparently only rudimentary lifeforms. Venus is a vast swamp world dominated by hulking reptiles and lizard men. The Moon is an airless dead world, but with mysteries hidden deep beneath the surface. Mars is an ancient desert planet in decline that is divided into warring decadent city-states clinging to a failing system of canals. Vulcan (named historically more correct Phaeton in Uhrwerk/Clockwork version) has exploded and become the asteroid belt. Limitations in technology cause the outer worlds to remain unreachable and unexplored. There are also hints that some worlds may have terrain hidden beneath their surface.

One of the treasures that spurred the Europeans to Mars was "liftwood": a rare cultivated plant with anti-gravity properties that allowed for the construction of giant floating ships. The Earthers used Martian sky galleons at first but later constructed their own armored steam-powered flyers.

Since Wireless was not invented yet in 1889, communication between Earth and Mars is handled by orbital heliograph stations. The game contains much more detail on the flora, fauna and species of the planets. Most published material is centred on Mars.

The Space: 1889 edition by Uhrwerk Verlag/Clockwork Publishing partially modified the alternate history of Earth, at Frank Chadwick's request. In this timeline, the revolutionary Paris Commune was successful in establishing itself as the form of government in France. More controversially, the American Civil War ended with the victory of the Confederate States because of the death of Abraham Lincoln from typhus in the spring of 1862. Maximilian I of Mexico is still emperor in 1889, and Siam is an emerging regional power under the government of Rama V.

The Space: 1889 After iteration takes place ten years after the original 1889 setting, and war and disaster have for a time separated the worlds.

== Publications ==
=== GDW (1989–1990) ===
- Space: 1889 by Frank Chadwick (1989). The core rulebook, hardback, 216 pages.
- Space: 1889 Referee's Screen by Julia Martin (1989).
- Tales From The Ether by Frank Chadwick, Marc Miller, Loren Wiseman, Ryan and Smith (1989), 64 pages. Five adventures.
- More Tales from the Ether by Brown, Smith, Ryan, and Blaine Pardoe, edited by Loren Wiseman (1989), 64 pages. Four Martian adventures.
- Beastmen of Mars by Lester Smith (1989), 64 pages. An adventure set on Mars.
- Canal Priests of Mars by Marcus Rowland, 1990, 64 pages. Adventure.
- Steppelords of Mars by John A. Theisen (1989), 64 pages. Campaign setting on the steppes of Mars.
- Caravans of Mars by Ed Andrews (1989), 64 pages. A caravan adventure set on Mars.
- Cloud Captains of Mars by Frank Chadwick (1989), 64 pages. Supplement on the aerial cloud ship captains and sky pirates.
- Conklin's Atlas of the Worlds and Handy Manual of Useful Information by Frank Chadwick (1989), 80 pages. The basic reference for Space: 1889, mapping Earth, Mars, Venus, Mercury, Luna, and Atlantis. Includes history and transport maps.
- Soldier's Companion by Frank Chadwick (1989), 196 pages. Miniatures rules for land and sky combat, with army lists.
- Ironclads and Ether Flyers by Frank Chadwick, boardgame. Rules for surface naval combat, including detailed information about Earth's navies and flyers. The rules are a simplification of Sky Galleons of Mars
- Sky Galleons of Mars, boardgame. Boxed game of aerial combat on Mars. It included large scale maps, ship miniatures, and rules.
- Cloudships & Gunboats, Sky Galleons of Mars expansion. Role playing game supplement with mini-scale deckplans, cardstock miniatures, rules, and ship diagrams.
- Temple of the Beastmen, boardgame. Boxed modular board game that never plays the same way twice.
- GDW's house magazine (Challenge) also contained material for the game.

=== 3W (1990) ===
- The Liftwood Conspiracy by Gary E. Smith, published under license by 3W (1989), 64 pages. Adventure on Mars.

=== Heliograph (1999–2002) ===
- Heliograph's magazine Transactions of the Royal Martian Geographical Society (fan material mostly originally published in the early 1990s) containing additional game material.
- The Complete Canal Priests of Mars by Marcus Rowland. The GDW edition cut about a third of the author's manuscript. The Complete Canal Priests of Mars restored all of the original text and had new illustrations throughout.
- Heliograph reprinted the rules portions of Sky Galleons of Mars and Cloudships & Gunboats, but did not reprint the boxed games themselves.

=== Pinnacle Entertainment Group (2010) ===
- Space 1889: Red Sands A Savage Worlds Plot Point Campaign published by Pinnacle Entertainment Group as a full-color hardback. The campaign "pits a desperate band of heroes against the Inner Circle of the Brotherhood of Luxor. The Brotherhood, led by the mysterious Kronos, King of the Titans, plots to bring about the end of all worlds." The campaign was released in November 2010, with a Gen Con debut in August.

=== Uhrwerk Verlag/Clockwork Publishing (2012–2018) ===
- Space: 1889 published first in German by Uhrwerk Verlag (Clockwork Publishing) in July 2012 as 264 pages full-color hardback, based on the Ubiquity rules. The sourcebooks of Venus and Mercury were published in 2015, Mars in 2016, and Luna in 2017. An English translation, by Uhrwerk Verlag and Chronicle City (later only Uhrwerk Verlag under Clockwork Publishing) was funded on Kickstarter in late 2013, met with continued delays but was finally completed. The English edition was released in 2014 (PDF) and 2015 (print).
- Marvels of Mars, focussed on martian fauna and flora as well as on martian technology and artifacts is also available since 2016.Venus Sourcebook is available since August 2017 (both as PDF and print).
- Mercury Sourcebook was released in May 2017 (PDF) and May 2018 (print).
- Mars Sourcebook, devoted to Mars history, geography, politics including colonial powers, and mysteries is available since November 2018 after a successful Kickstarter campaign. It includes most of the Information presented in Marvels of Mars and has harmonized most of the supplemental Information regarding Mars published by GDW and Heliograph.
- The City at the Center of the Earth, The Ether Calculator, On the Trails of Gods, London Bridge has Fallen Down, Thunders of Venus, The Fate of Angahiaa, Nocturne in the City of Lights, The Strange Land and Murder on the Ether Express, are all adventures available as PDF and print published by Clockwork Publishing for both Ubiquity and Savage Worlds rules.
- Phaetons Vermächtnis, Kolonie im Nebel, Unter Hochdruck, Der marsianische Patient are all expansions and adventures by Uhrwerk-Verlag currently available only in German, as well as the sourcebooks Paris 1889 - Im Angesicht der Welten and the above named Luna. Das Erbe der Kanalwächter is a translation into German and the Ubiquity rules of the Canals Priests of Mars adventure. Äther, Dampf und Stahlgiganten contains adventures printed in GDW's Magazine Challenge, adapted to Ubiquity rules, while Planet der Legenden includes adventures from both Challenge Magazine, Tales from the Ether and More Tales from the Ether, also adapted to Ubiquity rules.

=== Strange Owl Games (2023- ) ===
- Space 1889: After, both 5e and Empyrean editions are expected to be released by mid-2023

== Miniatures ==
GDW released a range of 25mm miniatures sculpted by Bob Murch of RAFM. These sets were collectively called Adversaries, and included Soldiers of the Queen (a "company" of 20 British infantry), Legions of Mars (a warband of 20 Martians), Kraag Warriors (20 High Martians, 10 each flying and walking), and Victorian Adventurers (10 diverse personalities, as seen in Temple of the Beastmen). In 2002, RAFM released Martian colonial infantry, cavalry & artillery crew, as well as new gashants (a Martian cavalry mount), Hill Martians and Canal Martians.

Highlander studios produced a line of 15mm miniatures.

== Computer game ==
A computer game adaptation of the same name was also released in 1990. It was developed by licensee Paragon, which produced four computer games for GDW.

== Audio dramas ==
Between 2005 and 2006, Noise Monster Productions produced audio adventures under license from Chadwick. The first three released stories are commonly referred to as The Mars Trilogy, and the fourth release The Lunar Inheritance is a stand-alone tale. Each was released on a single CD with a full-cast and running time of approximately 70 minutes.

The audio dramas released have been:

- Red Devils by Jonathan Clements
- The Steppes of Thoth by James Swallow
- The Siege of Alclyon by Marc Platt
- The Lunar Inheritance by Andy Frankham-Allen & Richard Dinnick

== eBooks ==
In 2011, Untreed Reads Publishing launched a series of Space: 1889 eBooks. Called Space: 1889 & Beyond, they were edited by Andy Frankham-Allen. The first series was based loosely on the Tales from the Ether supplement, introducing the characters, setting, aether, planets, and politics. The first series ran until February 2012. The second series of six books began in August 2012, for the first time advancing the setting beyond the year 1889, and pushing the narrative forward to previously unexplored areas of the property. The opening book of series two, Conspiracy of Silence, was the first time any Space: 1889 product has been set entirely on Earth (featuring characters from Frank Chadwick's forthcoming prequel novel The Forever Engine), with the series two finale, Horizons of Deceit Book I, being the second - serving as the opposite bookend of the season following the political manoeuvring seen in the previous novel. A third series of novels launched in July 2014, a further set of six books featuring authors who have all previously written for the series. Only the first two books in the series were published, and Untreed Reads is no longer publishing the series.

=== Series one (April to December 1889) ===
- Journey to the Heart of Luna by Andy Frankham-Allen
- Vandals on Venus by K.G. McAbee
- The Ghosts of Mercury by Mark Michalowski
- Abattoir in the Aether by L. Joseph Shosty
- A Prince of Mars by Frank Chadwick
- Dark Side of Luna by J. T. Wilson & Frank Chadwick

=== Series two December (1889 to October 1890) ===
- Conspiracy of Silence by Andy Frankham-Allen & Frank Chadwick ISBN 9781611874105
- Mundus Cerialis by Andy Frankham-Allen & Sharon Bidwell (based on an idea by Paul Ebbs)
- Leviathans of the Clouds by Steven Savile & David Parish-Whittaker
- A Fistful of Dust by Sharon Bidwell
- The Forever Journey by Paul F Gwyn (based on an idea by Mark Michalowski)
- Horizons of Deceit Book I by Jonathan Cooper

=== Series three October (1890 to late 1891) ===
- Horizons of Deceit Book II by Andy Frankham-Allen & Jonathan Cooper
- The Draco Eye by Sharon Bidwell

== Reception ==
G. E. Smith reviewed Space: 1889 in Space Gamer/Fantasy Gamer No. 85. Smith commented that "the Space: 1889 system encompasses a serious game, produced by serious game designers who have their tongues lovingly but firmly in their cheeks, at least in the technology areas. But it all seems to work wonderfully well and is a delight to read and work with, as well as play."

Paul Mason reviewed Space: 1889 for Games International magazine, and gave it 3 stars out of 5, and stated that "All in all, a good game. Not a great game, but certainly worth a try if you like the idea of the background."

Stewart Wieck reviewed Space: 1889 in White Wolf #15 (April/May 1989), rating it a 5 out of 5 and stated that "If the setting interests you at all, then you should try to game. The system itself is easy to learn and use and shouldn't interfere with your ability to tell a story."

In his 1990 book The Complete Guide to Role-Playing Games, game critic Rick Swan called this game "one of the most imaginative RPGs of the last decade." Swan thought the character generation rules were "a terrific system producing playable, well-rounded PCs in just a few minutes." Swan found the rest of the game "similarly elegant." Swan concluded by giving this game an excellent rating of 3.5 out of 4, saying, "What makes Space: 1889 a joy is its delightful setting, rendered in loving, whimsical detail."

The Games Machine reviewed Space: 1889 and stated that "this is one very entertaining package and after a play you'll soon be wanting to return to the Crown Colony of Sytis on Mars!"

In a 1996 reader poll conducted by UK magazine Arcane to determine the 50 most popular role-playing games, Space 1889 was ranked 20th. Editor Paul Pettengale commented: "Although the character generation is a delight—the stats include Social Standing—the system itself combines simplicity with incomprehensibility. You have to be prepared for lots of house rulings and on-the-spot improvising, or take an easier route and convert to another system. Comparisons with the later Falkenstein are inevitable and not necessarily to Falkenstein's credit. Space 1889 avoids fantasy hangovers, or the pretence that the setting is a utopia. Imperialism exists, and its complexities and gradiations are not glossed over. The game leaves it up to the players (and ref) to decide whether they become bold imperialists or bold freedom fighters for the Martians. You bring your own biases to Space 1889, rather than being forced to accept the predigested ideas of its authors."

== See also ==
- Alternative history
- Mars in fiction
- Mercury in fiction
- Venus in fiction
