= War Between the States 1861–1865 =

1977 American Civil War board wargame

War Between the States 1861–1865 is a grand strategy monster board wargame published by Simulations Publications Inc. (SPI) in 1977 that simulates the American Civil War. Players can choose to play scenarios representing a single year of the war, or can play a campaign game that covers the entire war in both the Eastern and Western Theaters from the Battle of Fort Sumter to the Confederate surrender at Appomattox Court House.

== Description ==
War Between the States is a monster wargame (more than 1000 counters) for two players, one of whom controls the Union forces, while the other controls the Confederate forces. The game, with a very large 66" x 34" (168 cm x 86 cm) hex grid map of the United States from Pennsylvania to Texas, 1400 counters, and a 20-page rulebook, has been described as "Not for any but the most determined beginners because of its length and complexity."

Counters represent between 1,000 and 10,000 men (infantry) or 5,000 cavalry.

=== Scenarios ===
Players can choose to play one of the three shorter scenarios, each of which represents a single year of the war: 1862, 1863 or 1864. Or the players can choose to play the campaign game, which covers the entire war.

=== Gameplay ===
==== Strategic turn ====
Four game turns, each of which represents one week of the war, are gathered into a "Game Cycle", representing one month. At the start of each monthly Game Cycle, the players complete a "Strategic Turn", doing the various economic, logistical, production, command, and political operations that are necessary to raise and maintain armies.

After both players complete activities in the Strategic Turn, the four weekly Game Turns then follow.

==== Game turns ====
At the start of each weekly game turn, the two players draw to see which one goes first. The first player then has the following opportunities:

- Movement, which includes both movement of military units and individual leader initiative.
- Combat

When this is completed, the second player is given the same opportunities for play.

=== Leadership ===
A variety of individual leaders are obtained by both players during the game (drawn randomly from a cup), and are essential for command and control of military units. Each leader is rated for Personal Initiative, Command Capability, and Combat. Headquarters are also necessary for issuing commands and enabling leaders of armies to control multiple units, and enter the game randomly during the Strategic Turn.

Each player can an issue a certain number of direct orders (the number varies each turn) but any other general must roll equal or less than his initiative rating to move. Whereas Grant, Sherman, Lee and Forrest rate 4, and will be able to move most turns, McClellan rates only 1 and Benjamin Butler 0 (Nicky Palmer wrote that he is “not going to poke his head out of Fort Monroe unless directly ordered to do so”). Whereas McClellan has a command rating of 5 (Palmer recommended he actually be placed second-in-command of the Army of the Potomac under "somebody more spirited"), Nathaniel Lyon has initiative 4 but a command rating of only 1, meaning he can command only one division or one HQ. Palmer commented that it is too easy for leaders to be killed or wounded and recommended that there only be a 1/36 chance of this happening, and that the rule whereby leaders can be captured and paroled to senior positions in the enemy army be ignored as it led to “silly results” (e.g. Lee being captured).

=== Naval war ===
The game also has a naval component, with both sea-going and river flotillas and Confederate ironclads. Each player must decide what types of ships to build.

=== Production ===
Coordinating the various areas of production, and then using that to build the forces necessary to meet future strategic war goals plays an important part of the game. Built units are placed on spiral displays, similar to those in War in Europe, becoming available a certain number of months in the future according to the type of unit.

Nicky Palmer described the production system as “absorbingly interesting”, with the chance to construct siege trains, railroad repair units and supply trains as well as infantry, cavalry and naval units. In order to produce units, throughout the game each player must issue fresh demands first for volunteers then for drafts at increasing political cost.

== Publication history ==
War Between the States was designed by Irad B. Hardy, with graphic design by Redmond A. Simonsen, and was published by SPI in 1977. Despite good critical reception, the game failed to crack SPI's Top Ten Best Selling Games list.

A revised edition was published by Decision Games in 2004.

== Reception ==
In his 1977 book The Comprehensive Guide to Board Wargaming, Nicky Palmer called War Between the States one of the finest examples of the grand strategic game, and felt that it offered "a depth and excitement unrivalled by its tactical colleagues, as each instrument in the orchestra, from small local skirmishes to full-scale battles, from complex supply problems to combined land-sea actions, joins to form a symphony of a game which you can play for years without finally 'solving' it." Palmer also warned that this is a long game, pointing out "Weather, supply and leadership constraints prevent either side dashing for a quick victory."

Three years later, in The Best of Board Wargaming, Palmer somewhat moderated his comments, calling the game "A flawed masterpiece" due to the many "murky points in the rules." He described the game as one of the “large and luscious” type of monster game (i.e. both very large and very complex) and “eminently playable again and again”. He also felt that the short one-year scenarios were "not very interesting", and recommended the full campaign game instead. The Confederate initial advantage in leaders allowed “marvellous excitement during 1861-3”, with much of the course of the game decided by the political stance taken by Missouri and Kentucky. However Union production would gradually gather strength and “1864-5 are largely devoid of interest as the Union pounds the defenders with a rain of dice”. Palmer recommended the "extensive" suggested rules amendments in Moves magazine number 46, and credited the game with awakening his interest in the American Civil War. He concluded by giving the game an excellent Excitement Grade of 90%, saying, "Given sufficient space and time, serious players will find it a rewarding experience."

In The Guide to Simulations/Games for Education and Training, history professor Martin Campion commented on the use of this game as an educational aid, saying, "If I taught a course on the Civil War only, I would be tempted to run this game as the main or only classroom activity in the course. As it is, the game contains at least a reference to the most important political and economic effects on military operations and the effects of operations on political and economic conditions. It is eminently suitable to multiple player use and will give everyone in a group of twenty-four something to do if the teams are organized correctly and if the production rules are used." Campion advised teachers that "Economic and political rules should be kept under the control of the instructor, who can use the published rules as guidelines rather than as absolutes."

In Issue 54 of Moves, Steve List gave this game a grade of "B", commenting, "Despite the cumbersome command rules, this game has a lot to offer. It is also the only strategic [American Civil War] game on the market, so despite its being an overgrown operational game, it is the only one in town covering the entire war."

== Awards ==
At the 1978 Origins Awards, War Between the States was a finalist for the Charles S. Roberts Award for "Best Strategic Game of 1977."

== Other reviews and commentary ==
- Strategy & Tactics #43
- Campaign #87
- The Wargamer Vol.1 #5
- Fire & Movement #12, #19 & #81
- Ann Arbor Wargamer #9
