= Come the Revolution =

Come the Revolution or Comes the Revolution may refer to:

== Music ==
- "Come the Revolution", a 2003 song by Corinne Bailey Rae
- "Come the Revolution", a song by Curt Smith from the 1993 album Soul on Board
- "Come the Revolution", a song by Girlschool from the 2015 album Guilty as Sin
- "Come the Revolution", a song by Julian Cope from the 2008 album Black Sheep
- "Come the Revolution", a song by Roy Harper from the 1998 album The Dream Society
- "Comes the Revolution", a song by George & Ira Gershwin from the 1933 musical Let 'Em Eat Cake

== Other uses ==
- Come the Revoltion, a play by Robin Chapman featured on Play for Today in 1977
- Come the Revoltion, a 1972 play by Albert Wendt
- Come the Revolution, the 2011 memoirs of Alex Mitchell
- Come the Revolution, a 2013 BBC Radio Wales comedy series hosted by Chris Corcoran
- Come the Revolution, a 2015 science fiction novel by Frank Chadwick
- "Come the Revolution", a 1989 TV episode of 227
- "Comes the Revolution", a 1963 episode of TV series The Farmer's Daughter
- "Comes the Revolution", a vaudeville comedy routine by the Howard Brothers
