= Highway to the Reich =

1976 WWII board wargame

Box cover of the 1977 SPI edition

Highway to the Reich is a grand tactical monster board wargame published by Simulations Publications, Inc. (SPI) in 1976 that simulates the World War II Allied operation known as Operation Market Garden.

== Description ==
In September 1944, Allied paratroopers attempted to seize 100 km (60 mi) of German-held highway and bridges in the Netherlands to open a bridgehead over the Rhine. Ground-based units were then sent up the highway in an attempt to consolidate the bridgehead. Highway to the Reich simulates this operation on a massive scale, using thousands of counters, a map board almost 3 meters (9 ft) long, and a 106-turn campaign game that can last hundreds of hours.

So many errors were found in the original set of rules, and so many errata issued, that the company published a second edition of the rules six months after the game's release.

=== Components ===
- four 22" x 34" paper hex grid maps, joined end to end to create a 22" x 136" map covering, scaled to 600 m (656 yd) per hex.
- 2400 counters
- 32-page rule book (2nd edition)
- various charts and player aids

=== Game mechanics ===
Units are infantry companies, artillery batteries and tank troops. They are rated for effectiveness (i.e. firepower – this factor is not reduced by step losses), strength (a proxy for manpower) and morale; paratroops have low effectiveness but high strength and morale, whereas a tank unit would have high effectiveness but low strength. The game places great emphasis on unit integrity (i.e. units of the same parent organization receiving a benefit for fighting together). Combat requires a great deal of die rolling, with a possibility of close combat between units after the exchange of fire.

=== Scenarios ===
The game includes an introductory scenario, "Hell's Highway", to learn the rules. Players can then choose one of five scenarios, each of which uses only one of the four maps:

1. "Drop of the 101st Airborne Division, 17–18 September 1944"
2. "Drop of the 82nd Airborne Division, 17–18 September 1944"
3. "Drop of the British 1st Airborne, 17–18 September 1944"
4. "Destruction of the British 1st, 19–21 September 1944"
5. "The Breakout of the XXX Corps"

All of these scenarios, and all four maps, can be joined into a 106-turn campaign game. Wargamer Academy rates the complexity of the game 10 on a scale of 10.

== Publication history ==
Highway to the Reich was designed by Jay Nelson and Irad B. Hardy, with cartography and artistic design by Redmond A. Simonsen, and was released in a large box by SPI in January 1976. Players immediately found many problems with the rules. SPI first issued several sets of errata, but finally hired Eric Goldberg to completely rewrite the rules. This second edition of the rule book was released in July 1977, and was offered free to anyone who had already purchased the first edition of the game.

After the demise of SPI, Decision Games acquired the license to the game and in 2008 issued a revised edition titled Highway to the Reich: The Allied Airborne Invasion of Holland, 1944, designed by J.A. Nelson and Joe Youst, with artwork by Joe Youst.

== Reception ==
In his 1977 book The Comprehensive Guide to Board Wargaming, Nicholas Palmer warned that this was a "massive company-level game," and that it "covers the full operation, from the first paratroop landings to the final evacuation (if the game goes historically, that is.)" In his 1980 sequel The Best of Board Wargaming Palmer wrote that Allied paratroops had "astoundingly low" casualty limits in the scenarios, and that the Allies were advised to play for a draw in these. He added that he had never come across anyone who claimed to have played the complete campaign game, although there was doubtless somewhere "a pair of mad hermits" who had done so. Palmer quoted the opinion of Geoff Barnard (see below) that the game contained a level of complexity that belonged in miniatures play, and added that it was "a fine game of its type" but that those who did not want such tactical detail should stick to a simpler game, e.g. the Arnhem game of the Westwall Quad.

In the Chicago Tribune, Roger Verhulst thought this monster game was "for the ambitious and those with a fondness for historical accuracy." Verhulst noted the "sophisticated refinements designed to increase realism." He warned that "you'll have to pay careful attention to the logistics of ammunition, supply and transport resources." Despite this, he concluded, "you'll be rewarded with an understanding of the largest airborne operation in military history that no movie can provide. You'll have experienced it from the inside."

In Issue 9 of Phoenix, Tony Dinsdale complimented the production values of the components, writing, "the counters are quite adequate and packed with information, though it is the map which takes the prize for artistic merit. Rivers look the part for once, frequently being over 2 cms in width." As impressive as Dinsdale found the components, "the real appeal for the game to me is the actual system [...] not too simple to begin with." However, he noted that "Highway to the Reich appears to have been rushed in some respects." In particular, he found the scenarios to be "horribly biased". Dinsdale concluded with a strong recommendation despite its perceived flaws, saying, "even in view of these facts, I consider HWTR to be an excellent simulation, especially for the more experienced gamer. No collection is fully complete without it since it is something of a breakthrough in World War II gaming."

In Issue 20 of Phoenix, Geoff Barnard acknowledged the complexity of the game, saying, "the system makes few concessions to playability. Even in the mini-scenarios using one map, the quantity and complexity of combat calculations each turn, never mind the need to keep a careful eye on all the other rules, makes for hard work." Barnard also commented that with hundreds of counters in play, "counter congestion" was a serious problem. Even with the second edition of the rules addressing many problems, he still found issues of historical accuracy with artillery, attrition, travel, as well as each of the four main scenarios.

In the next issue of Phoenix, Barnard offered a general review of World War II tactical games, and complimented Highway to the Reich for its novel rule for infantry units that have been damaged in combat. In most games, the units "dig in", reflected in a higher defensive value but lower combat value and lower (or no) mobility. Barnard noted that Highway to the Reich was unique in offering the player a choice of either the standard "digging in" rule, or retaining its mobility and combat values at the cost of even more damage. Barnard called this option "superbly realistic and yet operates so simply."

In The Guide to Simulations/Games for Education and Training, Martin Campion looked at the feasibility of using this as an educational aid, but concluded, "this is a large game and probably too complex and on too limited a subject to consider using it in a classroom."

In Issue 46 of Moves, Stuart Glennan emphasized the complexity of the game, pointing out that in addition to strategy, tactics, movement and combat, "the players are required to maintain divisional, regimental, and even battalion integrity for purposes of supply, artillery support, and combat."

== Awards ==
- At the 1978 Origins Awards, Highway to the Reich was a finalist for the Charles S. Roberts Award for "Best Tactical Game of 1977".

== Other reviews ==
- Fire & Movement No. 7 and No. 65
- American Wargamer Vol.5 No. 3
- Ann Arbor Wargamer, Issue No. 5
- Games & Puzzles #66
- Perfidious Albion #26 (March 1978) p.7-8
- Perfidious Albion #34 (December 1978) p.4-8
