= Space: 1889 (video game) =

1990 video game

- Developer: Paragon Software
- Publishers: NA: MicroProse; EU: Empire Software
- Designers: F. J. Lennon; Steve M. Suhy; Don Wuenschell
- Programmer: Don Wuenschell
- Artist: Steve M. Suhy
- Composer: Derek Schofield
- Platforms: MS-DOS, Amiga, Atari ST
- Release: 1990
- Genre: Adventure
- Mode: Single-player

Space: 1889 is an adventure game developed by Paragon Software and published in 1990 for Amiga, Atari ST, and MS-DOS.

== Plot ==
Space: 1889 is a science-fiction role-playing adventure game based on the Space: 1889 role-playing game by Game Designers' Workshop. The game is set in the 19th-century Victorian era where interplanetary travel has already been achieved, and discoveries have taken place, like the antigravitational liftwood on Mars in 1870 and hydrogen-filled airships. Great Britain is a constitutional monarchy, with the goal of making its colonies profitable rather than expanding the empire. The player creates five player characters, assigning them various skills and attributes. The scenario in the game involves the lead character being invited to a London museum opening to unveil several artifacts from newly discovered Egyptian tombs. Throughout the evening, the characters discover that they will need to mount an expedition to the tomb of King Tut. The game involves several other quests where the characters travel from London to San Francisco, then to the Far East, and eventually go to Mars, Mercury, and places beyond.

== Reception ==
Todd Threadgill reviewed the game for Computer Gaming World, stating that "Space 1889 is an intriguing product, and ideal for those who like adventures with a unique flavor. Players who revel in bloodshed should look elsewhere, but gamers who yearn for something different (and don't mind having a dash of history thrown in) will find what they're looking for in Space 1889".

Space: 1889 was reviewed in 1991 in Dragon #170 by Hartley, Patricia, and Kirk Lesser in "The Role of Computers" column, where the reviewers gave the game 4 out of 5 stars. Computer Gaming World's Scorpia in 1993 wrote that "Paragon's attempt to bring this paper RPG to life falls flat on its face". She criticized the graphics, plot, interface, combat, and ending, recommending it only to "hard-core Space 1889 (paper version) fans".
