= Canal Priests of Mars =

1990 role-playing game adventure module

Canal Priests of Mars is a 1990 role-playing game adventure for Space: 1889 published by Game Designers' Workshop.

== Plot summary ==
Canal Priests of Mars is an adventure in which the player characters must travel to Mars on a security job.

== Publication history ==
Canal Priests of Mars was written by Marcus L. Rowland, with a cover by Dell Harris, and illustrations by Rick Harris and Larry MacDougall, and was published by Game Designers' Workshop in 1990 as a 64-page book.

== Reception ==
Games International magazine reviewed Canal Priests of Mars and stated that "distinguished by some excellent non player characters. There is also plenty of detail on ether flyers, floorplans of martian buildings and so on."
