= 1815: The Waterloo Campaign =

Board wargame published in 1975

- Cover of 1st edition rulebook, 1975
- Designers: John Astell; Frank Chadwick
- Illustrators: Rodger B. MacGowan
- Publishers: Game Designers Workshop
- Publication: 1975
- Genres: Napoleonic

1815: The Waterloo Campaign is a board wargame published by Game Designers' Workshop (GDW) in 1975 that simulates the final three days of Napoleon's last campaign, culminating in the Battle of Waterloo. Reviewers characterized the game as not too complex, playable, fast-moving, and enjoyable. The game was found to be tilted in favor of the French, and GDW released a second edition in 1982 that addressed that issue.

== Description ==
1815 is a two-player wargame in which one player controls Napoleon's forces, and the other the Allied forces arrayed against France. The game covers Napoleon's final battles in the three-day span from the Battle of Ligny to the Battle of Waterloo. The game is 49 turns long, but as critic William W. Easton noted, the game "is essentially simple, and play moves rapidly, with tension and uncertainty an ever-present part of the play."

The rules are developed from previous GDW wargames Torgau and Crimea, and use a traditional "I Go, You Go" system of alternating turns, where one player moves and then fights, and then the other player does the same. Special rules include:

- Some cavalry have a "shock" value added to their combat rating when charging. Following a charge, however, cavalry horses are "blown" and cannot move during the following turn, leaving them exposed to counterattacks.
- The game uses "step reduction damage." The first time a unit is damaged, its counter is flipped over to illustrate the damage. The second time the unit is damaged, it is removed from the board.
- A unit that is disrupted only moves at half rate, and cannot attack. The unit stays disrupted until the next morning. (The only exceptions to this are units of the British, the French, and the King's German Legion. which can roll a die to see if they recover the next turn.) If the French Old Guard is disrupted, it has a domino effect on other French units.
- The various national armies also have different stacking rules to simulate the various sizes of divisions and regiments.

With a large 22 in × 27 in (56 cm × 69 cm) paper hex grid map and over 200 double-sided counters, the game has been characterized as "moderately complex tending towards the simple."

Box cover of 2nd edition, with artwork by Rodger B. MacGowan, 1982

=== 2nd edition rule changes ===
Following complaints that the game was tilted in favor of the French, GDW issued a second edition in which several rule changes were made in favor of the Allies. The map was shifted 6 km (4 mi) to the west to reduce the French maneuvering room. A leadership rule was added where units had to be within a set number of hexes of a leader counter in order to advance adjacent to an enemy unit, which was less favorable to developing a French attack. The French no longer got a bonus to their attack odds. Movement during the night was restricted to roadways. The arrival of the Prussian Corps was moved ten turns earlier. The way the French start their first move was changed, and there was a possibility of one or two Allied divisions being hidden from view, allowing for the chance that the French would unexpectedly stumble upon them during an attack.

== Publication history ==
1815 was designed by John Astell and Frank Chadwick, and released as a zip lock bag game by GDW in 1975. This proved to be the most popular Napoleonic wargame in North America for two years until GDW published La Bataille de la Moscowa. However, complaints emerged about the imbalance of the game rules, which heavily favored the French to win. In 1982, GDW released a second edition with revised rules that addressed the imbalance issue. This was released as a boxed set with cover art by Rodger B. MacGowan.

Following the demise of GDW, Kokusai-Tsushin Co. (国際通信社) acquired the rights to the game, and in 2015 published a Japanese-language edition as a pull-out game in Issue 122 of Command magazine.

== Reception ==
In Issue 27 of Moves, game designer Richard Berg was impressed by the quality of the components in the first edition, saying, "GDW's counter-work is, again, the best-looking in the industry. The counters are neat, precise, informative, and colorful." Due to the "blown cavalry" rule, Berg warned that "cavalry charges and attacks must be planned with precision; they cannot be wasted assaulting useless objectives because their vulnerability to counter-attack is far above that of a normal unit." Berg's only complaint was that some rules were ambiguous, adding, "With an outfit as sophisticated and capable as GDW, this is often frustrating." Despite these problems, Berg ended on a positive note, concluding, "1815 is an exciting, well-designed game. It should — and will — be played often, for it offers the players a wide spectrum of challenges. The action is fast and furious without being a simple slugfest — at least until the end game. Despite its several flaws, it is a game well worth owning."

In Issue 8 of Perfidious Albion, Geoff Barnard and Charles Vasey exchanged thoughts about the game. Barnard commented, "This game can be seen both as GDW's attempt to improve upon [Avalon Hill]'s Waterloo and as their challenge to the [Simulations Publications] "Quadrigame" systmes. It succeeds on both counts, and by a considerable margin." The only issue Barnard had was "that the game now lasts for about 49 game turns, although when mud sets in on the second day movement becomes so slow that not a lot can happen and the turns can go by quite quickly." Vasey replied, "This one took some assimilating. I am still working out the best methods to use in certain circumstances. The combat system is a massive advance ... The cavalry rules work well." The only issue Vasey had was "that the very subject will tend to the usual failings of historical battles. In the game one always finds oneself fighting miles from the real area in part of the map where details are thin. " Vasey also thought some short scenarios should have been included with the game.

In Bulletin #111 of the Special Libraries Association (Geography and Map Division), William W. Easton called the rules of the first edition "especially interesting" and noted that "1815 has been designed with playability in mind, using the proven move-fight sequence, rigid zones of control, and limited step reduction." He concluded that it was "a tense, fast-moving game, with the French racing against time to lever apart the enemy armies, and defeat them in detail before capturing Brussels."

In Issue 17 of the UK wargaming magazine Phoenix, Jeff Parker admired many of the rule developments in the first edition of 1815, which he thought raised above previously published Napoleonic games about Waterloo. He especially liked the cavalry rules, the "shock points" enjoyed by some units, and terrain rules. Parker also argued that these new rules did not detract from the game's playability; instead, he found them "easily manageable and make an immense difference to a player's understanding of Napoleonic warfare."

In his 1980 book The Best of Board Wargaming, Nick Palmer commented that the "fairly straightforward operational-level rules are supplemented by various interesting tactical aspects." Palmer concluded by giving the game an Excitement grade of 70%, saying, "overall, both sides get a good run for their money."

In The Guide to Simulations/Games for Education and Training, Martin Campion reviewed the first edition and commented, "The rules are fairly simple, but the game nevertheless makes realistic distinctions in the way it handles infantry, cavalry, and artillery." His only complaint about the game was that "The map is hard to read because of too little difference between two types of road." As an educational aid, Campion thought that 1815 "could easily [become] a multiplayer classroom game."

In Issue 52 of Moves, Ian Chadwick reviewed the 1st edition, and commented "The counters are colorful enough [...] but the map is drab and lifeless." But Chadwick found "a lot of good ideas and interesting rules in this game." However, he thought that the one long scenario could have been broken up into several shorter scenarios. He concluded by giving the game grades of B for playability, B for historical accuracy, and C for component quality, saying, "The game is interesting, highly playable, but by no means outstanding. There is some unusual and enjoyable treatment of unit functions, but the poor map quality detracts from the appreciation of the finer elements."

Writing for The Wargamer, John Burtt reviewed the second edition released in 1982, reminding readers that the 1st edition had been unbalanced in favor of the French. He called the new two-section map "much more colorful and pleasant than the old map, reflecting the current state of graphic arts" and noted a shift in the map some 6 km (4 mi) to the west, which reduced maneuvering room for the French on their left and made for more interesting engagement with the Prussians. Burtt also noted changes in the rules that made the game more difficult for the French player. Burtt concluded "this classic was worth a revision, and I like most of what they have done. For 1815 buffs, the revised edition is worth having — for others, it is worth a good look."

== Other reviews and commentary ==
- Campaign #73
- Strategy & Tactics #32
- Fire & Movement #3
