= Avalanche: The Salerno Landings =

1976 WWII board wargame

Avalanche!
- Cover of the 1st edition rulebook
- Designers: Frank Chadwick
- Illustrators: Rich Banner
- Publishers: Game Designers' Workshop
- Publication: 1976
- Genres: WWII

Avalanche: The Salerno Landings is a board wargame published by Game Designers' Workshop (GDW) in 1976 that simulates the nine-day battle for the beachhead at Salerno in September 1943 following the Allied amphibious landing known as Operation Avalanche.

== Historical background ==
Following the Allied invasion of Italy from Sicily in 1943, German defenders were successfully delaying the British 8th Army from advancing north. In an attempt to outflank the German defenders, General Mark Clark's Fifth Army landed at Salerno, about 20 miles south of Naples, on September 9. "Operation Avalanche", as it was called, pitted the Allies trying to break out of the beachhead against the German defenders, who strove to destroy the landing forces before they could link up with the British 8th Army.

== Description ==
Avalanche: The Salerno Landings is a tactical, company-level simulation of Operation Avalanche. The game is designed for two players (or two teams), one taking the Allied side trying to successfully break out of the Salerno beachhead, and the other playing the German defenders who are trying to either throw the Allies back into the sea, or inflict maximum casualties on the Allies. Reviewer Geoff Barnard called it the first "tactical/operational" wargame.

=== Components ===
The game components include:

- Two 22” x 28” hex grid maps (with Turn Record Chart and Terrain Key incorporated) scaled at 1300 yds (1190 m) per hex
- 960 ½” cardboard Counters (includes armor, armored infantry, motorized infantry, paratroops, glider troops, commandos, infantry, artillery, antiaircraft, antitank, engineers, naval, and information markers)
- 5½”x 8½” 20-page rulebook
- two 8½” x 11” Allied charts and two 8½” x 11” German charts
- 5½” x 8½” sheet of Errata (dated July 20, 1976)
- 6-sided die
- “Zip-Lock” Bag (1st edition) or box (all subsequent printings) to hold components

=== Gameplay ===
The game is scaled to 8 hours per game turn (morning, afternoon and night of each day.) The game lasts from the start of the landings on 9 September 1943 to 17 September 1943 when Allied reinforcements arrive, a total of 25 turns. During each turn, both sides have an opportunity for player movement, simultaneous artillery fire, and combat.

==== Movement ====
Rather than assigning different movement factors to each unit, this game assigns ten movement points to every unit, but each unit uses them at a different rate to move through each hex. For example, tanks will use fewer movement points per hex, allowing them to move farther each turn than an infantry unit, which must spend more movement point on each hex.

==== Stacking ====
Large numbers of units are allowed to be stacked in each hex, as long as they all belong to the same battalion.

=== Scenarios ===
In addition to the main historical simulation, the rules also include four optional "what if" scenarios using different orders of battles, different reinforcement arrivals and improved German supply capability.

=== Victory conditions ===
The Allies are victorious if a given number of units can successfully break out of the beachhead area, or if they can survive until their reinforcements arrive on September 17. The Germans win if they can prevent enough Allied units from breaking out of the beachhead, or if they can destroy the Allies before September 17.

== Publication history ==
The game was designed by Frank Chadwick, with graphic design by Rich Banner. It was published by GDW in 1976 packaged in a ziplock bag, but later was produced as a boxed set.

== Reception ==
In Issue 11 of Perfidious Albion, Charles Vasey was impressed by the game, writing, "In few WWII games have I spent time considering the emplacement of my flak, the wisest use of my engineers to destroy a road as I retreat, desperately searching for infantry to attack with the tanks, yet all of these are required to win this game." Vasey concluded, "A real must for all WWII buffs, and very enjoyable for those of us who are just interested. It does take a long time but it is worth it."

In Issue 55 of the UK magazine Games & Puzzles (December 1976), Nick Palmer called the movement system "simple and ingenious", but called the stacking rule "realistic but tiresome", since it necessitated "careful examination of each stack to make sure that a stray company from another battalion has not sneaked in." Given the game's complexity and the large number of counters, Palmer agreed that "It sounds like a recipe for trench warfare, but in fact tension is constantly maintained." He thought the game was slightly unbalanced in favor of the Allies, "but the game is so rich in strategic and tactical alternatives that it is impossible to explore every avenue for each side." Palmer concluded, "Anyone buying this game will have a real challenge to his skill which will last him years — but unless you can keep it set up over a long period, you will rarely finish a game." In his book The Comprehensive Guide to Board Wargaming, Palmer called this game "highly sophisticated in land combat, with one of the most advanced simulations of special unit functions appearing in any game yet published." Although he admired the "Numerous special-function units, attractive board, clear rules, interesting choice of strategies for both sides," he warned that games were "very long (up to 50 hours or so)." He concluded that the game was "Marvellous for lovers of complex, realistic games, but frightful for a beginner." In his 1980 sequel, The Best of Board Wargaming, Palmer added "The game does suffer from some minor historical errors [...] but these do not affect play."

In Issue 19 of Phoenix (May/June 1979), Rob Gibson recommended this game for more experienced players due to its complexity, but suggested that in a team situation, beginners could be given command of a small unit in order to learn the rules. Gibson felt that "On the whole, this is an excellent simulation of a very complex and confused battle and well worth learning the rules to play." He concluded, "This is one of the best simulations of an amphibious operation I have come across so far — well worth buying and very rewarding to play. Highly recommended."

In The Guide to Simulations/Games for Education and Training, Martin Campion questioned its usefulness in the classroom, saying, "The rules are inexact at times, and would have to be supplemented extempraneously from time to time." He concluded "Because this is a large game on a small subject, I will probably not use it, but it is good in its way."

In a retrospective review in Issue 32 of Phoenix (July–August 1981), Geoff Barnard wrote "For its day Avalanche contained many rules and ideas which ought to have been in other games." However, he pointed out that in terms of historical accuracy, "as time has gone by, accumulated play experience and piled up historical research has made it increasingly obvious that Avalanche is severely wanting." Barnard, who is British, found the details about the British contribution to the battle to be largely inaccurate. He also pointed out that an entire German artillery regiment was missing. However, he concluded "I still feel that [Avalanche] has my essential ingredient for a wargame, historical interest. It is the sort of game you can study, that gives those players who are interested in more than just what is going on, something to ponder rather than merely shuffling counters and counting factors."

== Awards ==
At the 1977 Origins Awards, Avalanche won the Charles S. Roberts Award for "Best Graphics and Physical Systems of 1976."

== Reviews ==
- Fire & Movement #6
- Grenadier #8
- Moves #30 (Dec/Jan 1977)
- Panzerfaust and Campaign #76 (Nov/Dec 1976)
- Campaign #79 (May–June 1977)
