= Waterloo (board game) =

Board wargame

- Designers: Thomas Shaw
- Publishers: Avalon Hill
- Publication: 1962
- Genres: Napoleonic board wargame

Waterloo is a Napoleonic board wargame published by Avalon Hill in 1963 that simulates the Battle of Waterloo. It was one of the first board wargames produced and despite its lack of historicity and complexity, it still received positive comments more than twenty years later as a fun and playable game, and remained in Avalon Hill's catalogue until 1990.

== Background ==
When Napoleon returned from 11 months of exile on Elba in 1815, the powers that had defeated him the previous year quickly formed the Seventh Coalition and mobilized large armies to march on Paris. Napoleon believed his only hope of success was to quickly take on each opposing army individually and defeat them piecemeal. As the first step, Napoleon marched into Belgium, hoping to defeat the Duke of Wellington's Anglo-Dutch force before it could rendezvous with the Prussian army under Marshal Blucher.

== Description ==
Waterloo is a two-player wargame in which one player takes the role of Napoleon, and the other controls the Allied forces. The game is played on a mounted hex grid map of the Belgian countryside.

=== Gameplay ===
The game begins as Napoleon crosses over into Belgium at 7:00 a.m. on 16 June 1815, and simulates the skirmishes and battles over the next five days, culminating in the Battle of Waterloo. At the start of the game, the French have a larger army, but will receive no reinforcements. The smaller Allied armies will receive significant reinforcements later in the game. Players are allowed to stack infantry units in one hex up to 15 combat factors. Game designer Frank Chadwick noted that the stacking rules "Though primitive by today's standards, are nevertheless revolutionary in that they provide the first use of stacking points [in board wargaming] that I have been able to discover."

The simple game mechanics use a standard "I Go, You Go" format, where the French player moves and then attacks, followed by the Allies, completing one game turn, which represents two hours of the battle. The game ends after 30 turns. Although leaders are represented by individual counters, they have no effect on play.

If a French unit moves off the north edge of the board towards Brussels, the Allied player must remove one Allied unit from the board in a process known as "defection."

The 30-turn campaign is the only game provided, although Avalon Hill published a number of alternate scenarios in various issues of their house magazine, The General.

=== Victory conditions ===
The French player wins by eliminating all Allied units either through combat or defection before the end of the last turn. The Allied player wins by either preventing the French victory conditions, or by eliminating all French units.

== Publication history ==
After Charles S. Roberts incorporated The Avalon Hill Games Company in 1958, he hired Thomas Shaw to design games. One of Shaw's first wargames was Waterloo, published in 1962. Some players complained the game was unbalanced and some rules were ambiguous, and to address these concerns, a second edition was designed by Lindsey Schultz and released in 1978. Although the game was never a bestseller like other "classic" Avalon Hill games such as Gettysburg and Afrika Korps, Avalon Hill continued to sell Waterloo until 1990.

== Reception ==
In a 1976 poll conducted by SPI to determine the most popular board wargames in North America, Waterloo only placed 136th out of 202 games. In a poll conducted the same year by Avalon Hill to determine the popularity of their own products, Waterloo placed 19th out of 25 Avalon Hill products.

In the 1977 book The Comprehensive Guide to Board Wargaming, Nicky Palmer thought the game offered "plenty of excitement and action as usual" and noted that the second edition would "eliminate some of the oddities" of the first edition rules. However, Palmer found the game "weak on realism, especially with the absence of a special role for artillery."

In the 1980 book The Complete Book of Wargames, game designer Jon Freeman commented "Waterloo is the spiritual progenitor of all the operational Napoleonic-era simulations. It is first and foremost a game, and French combat factors were modified for play balance." Freeman concluded by giving the game an Overall Evaluation of Good, saying, "While it is seriously lacking in realism, the game captures something of the feel of the period and remains fun to play."

In The Guide to Simulations/Games for Education and Training, Martin Campion commented "Among avid players of wargames, Waterloo is known as a 'classic', which means that it has little claim to historical accuracy but that it is old and fun to play."

In a retrospective reviews in Issue 52 of the wargaming magazine Moves (August–September 1980), Ian Chadwick noted that the 18-year-old game "is a far cry from state-of-the-art ... As with many early wargames, the map leaves much to be desired." Chadwick also believed "There is little historical accuracy in either map set-up or counters ... this was the first of many Waterloo games in which opposing armies formed more or less solid fronts across the board, quite unlike the real battle and more WW2 than Napoleonic." Despite these problems, Chadwick concluded "Despite the lack of realism, the boring graphics, and the distance the game is removed from reality, it is still playable, balanced game. It is hard to be seriously angry at one of the grandfathers of modern wargames." Chadwick awarded grades of B− for playability, C for historical accuracy, and D for component quality.

In Issue 7 of the French games magazine Casus Belli, Henri Gregoire wrote a retrospective review twenty years after the game's original publication and admitted "It is a classic and is of interest only to the collector. The map, which is far from perfect as in most old games, and a very 'approximately' historical simulation, are the main criticisms." Despite this, Gregoire concluded, "But it is a well-balanced game, pleasant to play."

Henry Lowood, writing in Zones of Control: Perspectives on Wargaming, noted that for its early games, Avalon Hill did not develop a house set of rules to be used and reused in different games. On the contrary, Waterloo and other early Avalon Hill games "stood alone, covering a single conflict situation with a bespoke system, components and rules. They were fixed on a single topic."

== Other recognition ==
A copy of Waterloo is held in the collection of the Strong National Museum of Play (object 112.6921).

== Other reviews and commentary ==
- Fire & Movement #24
- Campaign #77
- Strategy & Tactics #32
- Panzerfaust #55
- Spartan Simulations Gaming Journal #3
