= War in the Pacific (board game) =

1978 World War II board wargame

Cover art

War in the Pacific: The Campaign Against Imperial Japan, 1941–45, is a board wargame published by Simulations Publications Inc. (SPI) in 1978 that simulates the Pacific Campaign during World War II. Critics gave the game positive reviews, praising its use of logistics and "fog of war", and its well-written rules.

== Description ==
War in the Pacific is a two-player board wargame where one player controls Japanese forces and the other player controls Allied forces. With a 56-page rulebook, 3200 die-cut counters, and seven maps totaling 88 in × 102 in (220 cm × 260 cm), the game has been rated as 100 on a complexity scale of 100. Every warship from aircraft carriers and battleships down to destroyers that sailed on the Pacific Ocean during World War II is represented by a counter. Air counters represent a grouping of ten aircraft.

=== Gameplay ===
The game uses a series of three naval and three air phases each turn, which represent one week of the war. Supply and logistics play a central part in the game. Supply points must be transported to where they are needed, usually via merchant shipping, which is vulnerable to enemy submarines and aircraft. As critic John Kula noted, "Victory stands, and falls, on the ability of the players to generate, move and use their supply points. Everything depends on supply points and bases. Everything. Supply in the Pacific would have been a more accurate name for the game." Amphibious invasions need to be planned in advance, and production of ships and units up to eight years in advance. Players are required to track the fuelling (based on recent speeds) and refitting of each ship, and supply for land and air forces.

Rather than having hundreds of ship counters on the map at the same time, players organize their ships into various task forces off the map, and place one counter on the map for each task force. A player may deploy dummy task forces. Map clutter is further reduced by deploying only one counter for the many aircraft at each airbase.

The "fog of war" is an important part of the game. As a task force counter steams across the Pacific, the opponent tries to glean what ships are in the task force and therefore the possible mission of the task force. Although land-based observers and submarines can produce accurate reports, players must depend mainly on aircraft, which have a lower rate of accuracy. For each air-based observation of a task force, the task force owner pulls a random counter which directs the player to give the observing player either the complete truth of the task force's composition, a somewhat exaggerated or underestimated composition, or a completely false report. As critic Nicky Palmer noted, "While many other games have attacked the problem of excessive information, War in the Pacific is the first strategic game to incorporate partial intelligence as the cornerstone of its system. More than anything else, this feature distinguishes the simulation and justifies the considerable effort which playing the game requires."

Although there are ten different playing aids included with the game, each player is still required to keep extensive notes. As Nicky Palmer noted, "The playing aids provided need to be supplemented by copious scratch paper, best assembled in loose-leaf notebooks to keep some control of the situation."

=== Scenarios ===
The game offers five separate scenarios, each of which can take between 10 and 60 hours to play:

- "Pearl Harbor" (Six months/24 turns)
- "Midway" (Two months/8 turns)
- "Guadalcanal" (5 months/21 turns)
- "Burma" (6 months/26 turns)
- "Leyte" (2 months/8 turns)

All five scenarios can be combined into a campaign game covering the entire war, which takes several hundred hours to complete.

== Publication history ==
In the mid-1970s, SPI published several "monster" wargames (games with more than 1000 counters) that proved very popular, including War in Europe (1976), Terrible Swift Sword (1976), and Wacht am Rhein (1977). Following the success of these games, a team of game designers — Edward Curran, Jim Dunnigan, Irad B. Hardy, and Tom Walczyk — created War in the Pacific, SPI's most complex game to date. It was published in 1978 with graphic design by Redmond A. Simonsen, packaged in either a large "detergent box" format, or a "flatpack" package of four plastic trays.

War in the Pacific proved popular, and stayed in SPI's Top 10 Bestselling Games list for six months after its publication.

In 1989, Hobby Japan published a Japanese-language edition titled "太平洋戦争" (Pacific War).

Decision Games acquired the rights to War in the Pacific and published a second edition in 2006. In an extensive revision of the rules, this edition replaced the entire supply and logistics system with a command point system.

== Reception ==
British critic Nicky Palmer called this game "my personal favourite, for depth of strategy the game is probably without equal", and wrote about it several times. In Issue 28 of the British wargaming magazine Phoenix, Palmer commented on the "fog of war" as an intrinsic part of the game, saying that unreliability of ship sightings "comes as a shock [to veteran gamers], since in this game it is possible and even probable that your information about enemy dispositions is wildly incorrect. Large carrier-backed forces turn out to be a few heavy cruisers plus a dose of jittery imagination by your spotters; innocuous task forces cruising in enemy waters turn into deadly arrows speeding to the heart of your defences. You are no longer omniscient; on the contrary, you are worryingly short of reliable information, and accurate reconnaissance becomes as important a preoccupation as tactical placement." In his 1980 book The Best of Board Wargaming, Palmer listed the game as the epitome of monster games which are both very large and very complicated, and noted that in his experience, the game "seems to produce satisfyingly historical results." He did note that "The realism of the simulation is somewhat suspect in detail, but the remarkable search power attributed to aircraft is balanced by the ghastly uncertainty of the reports they bring home." Palmer rated the game as unplayable solitaire but gave it an Excitement Grade of 75%, saying, "Careful strategists will enjoy the long struggle, with each major battle preceded by many feints and skirmishes, but it is quite hard work, and the scenarios are usually quite long as well" and added that the game will generate naval battles as dramatic as those in the real war.

Writing shortly after the sudden demise of SPI, Wes McCoy and Nick Schuessler commented, "War in the Pacific is SPI's best monster, and probably the best wargame produced by that company over its 14 year effort [...] If SPI had a 'finest hour', it must have come in 1978 when War in the Pacific appeared." McCoy and Schuessler concluded, "War in the Pacific stands as a monument to SPI. If a single game can typify what SPI meant — the blending of technically accurate data with realistic and workable game systems — then War in the Pacific is that game."

In a retrospective review in Issue 4 of Simulacrum, John Kula noted, "As a simulation, WitP is quite accurate, so much so that the Japanese player's best hope is not in winning, which is well nigh impossible for him/her, but in prolonging the war and staving off defeat." Kula noted that despite the game's size and complexity, "It's not unplayable, as the rules have a reputation for being clear and unambiguous, the sequence of events is simple and unit density is kept low (except in China) through the use of naval task forces and air bases." Kula did admit that "One of the most common complaints, however, had to do with time and space distortions, resulting in too generous movement abilities and anomalous rules to correct the effects, as well as difficulties with limiting intelligence, and with meshing the naval, air and land systems."

== Other reviews and commentary ==
- Strategy & Tactics #65
- Fire & Movement #68 and #71
- Moves #45–47
- American Wargamer Vol.5 #12
- Boardgame Journal #2
