= Drang Nach Osten! =

Board game

Cover art by Don Lowry, 1973

Drang Nach Osten! ("Drive to the East!") is a monster board wargame published in 1973 by Game Designers' Workshop (GDW) that simulates Operation Barbarossa, the German invasion of the Soviet Union in 1941. The game was the first of what was envisioned as a series of games with identical wargame rules and map scale that would simulate the entire Second World War in Europe.

== Description ==
Drang Nach Osten!, characterized as a "monster game" because it has more than 1000 counters, is a two-player (or two-team) game that covers Operation Barbarossa along World War II's Eastern Front between 22 June 1941 and 31 March 1942.

=== Components ===
The game, packaged in a ziplock bag, contains:

- 1792 die-cut counters
- Five 21" x 27" maps that, when put together, cover the Eastern Front from Warsaw in the west to Stalingrad in the east, and from Murmansk in the north to Sevastopol in the south. The map scale used in the entire Europa series is 25 km (16 mi) per hex.
- Rules folder with 20-page rulebook and game cover art
- Ten charts and aids

=== Gameplay ===
Each turn represents 2 weeks of game time – characterized as first half of the month and last half of the month. Movement is modified by both terrain and weather. Combat results are determined by the ratio of attackers to defenders. Supplies are dependent upon home cities that act as supply depots.

=== Victory conditions ===
To win, the Axis player/team must capture every major Soviet city hex before the end of the 19th turn (second half of March 1942). The Soviet player/team wins by preventing this.

== Publication history ==
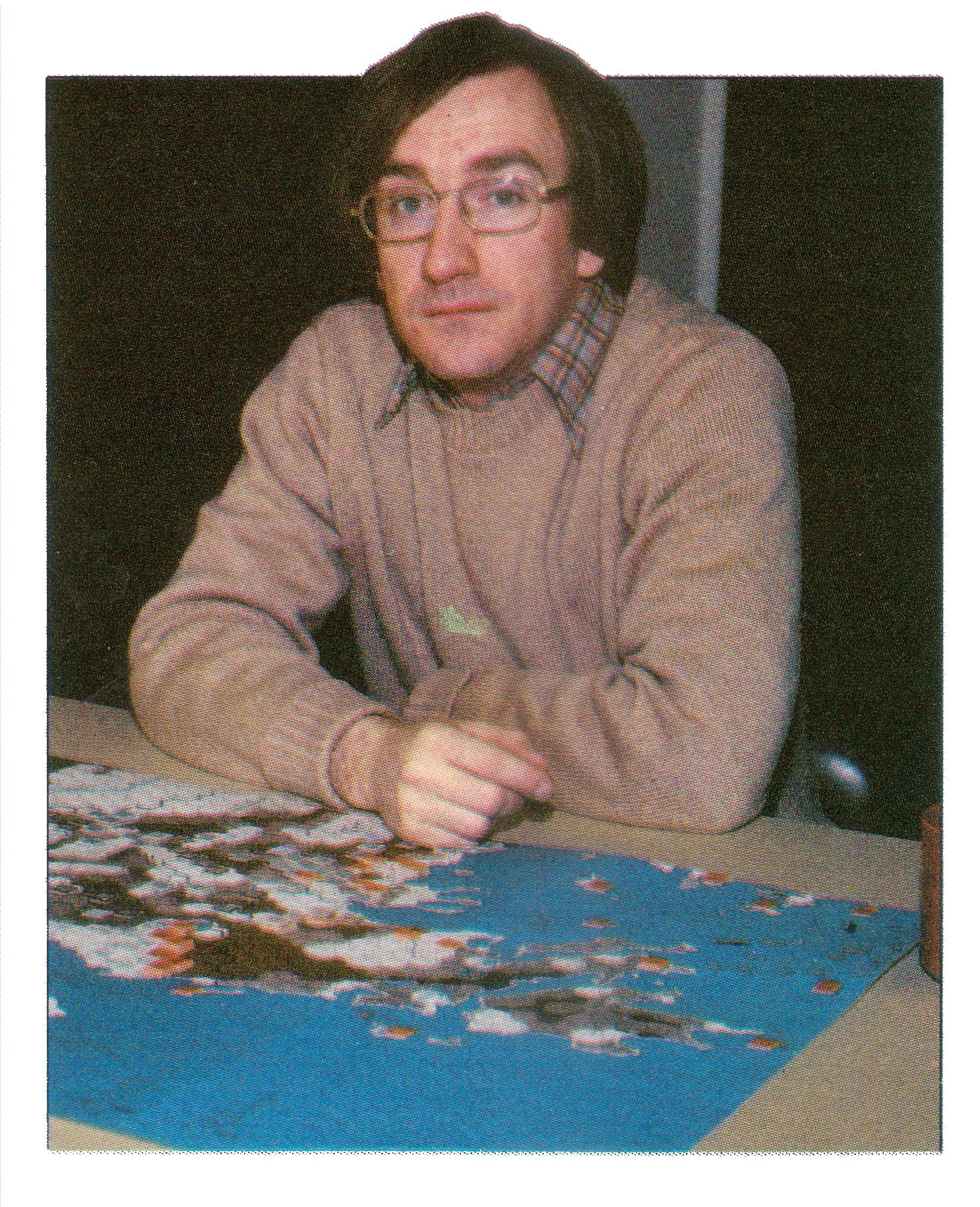
Wargame designer Paul "Rich" Banner in 1980

In 1973, GDW published Drang Nach Osten!, a game designed by Paul R. Banner and Frank Chadwick, as the first in the 'East Front Trilogy'. Cover art was by Don Lowry. GDW also published an expansion kit, Unentschieden ("Stalemate"), in 1973, that extends the simulation to the end of the war in May 1945. This was the first game of Europa, a planned series of games with identical wargame rules and map scale that would simulate the entire Second World War in Europe.

In 1984 Banner, Chadwick, Marc Miller and John Astell revised and greatly expanded Drang Nach Osten! and GDW published this expansion as Fire in the East.

GDW went out of business before the entire Europa line could be completed. Following the demise of GDW, Game Research/Design (GRD) acquired the license to Fire in the East, and announced a new edition titled Total War, which to date, has not been published.

== Reception ==
In a 1976 poll of 202 wargames conducted by Simulations Publications Inc., wargame players rated Drang nach Osten! as Number 1.

In his 1977 book The Comprehensive Guide to Board Wargaming, Nick Palmer wrote, "There is a school of thought which holds that the Europa series is for admiring and revelling in the rules rather than playing, but it is playable [...] given enough time or (more realistically) enough players."

In the 1980 book The Complete Book of Wargames, game designer Jon Freeman questioned the balance of the game, stating "The Germans roll. [...] Only a top group of Russian players will be able to overcome this." While Freeman admitted that Drang nach Osten! was a legend, he said it was not because of its playability, but "because it proved big games — nay, monster games — had a place in the hobby." With its extreme size and complexity, Freeman found playing the game was like "sucking wind uphill." He also found that due to the length of time needed to play — he estimated two years — "Playability is limited to large groups with plenty of time on their hands." Freeman refused to give an Overall Evaluation grade for the game, saying "Its significance far exceeds its intrinsic merit {...] Not for public consumption."

In The Guide to Simulations/Games for Education and Training, Martin Campion summarized the complexity of this game, saying it "shows a lot about the war but at a terrific cost in time and trouble."

== Other reviews ==
- Fire & Movement #17 and #63
- Grenadier #11
- Panzerfaust #59 and #64
- Moves #50, p27
- Games & Puzzles #57

== See also ==
- Victory! The Battle for Europe
