= Game Research/Design =

Board wargame publisher

Game Research/Design (GR/D) was a board wargame publisher, principally concerned with the Europa series of European World War II wargames. GR/D was formed in 1985 by John Astell, one of the Europa designers, and Winston Hamilton, another World War II wargame designer. The company published several Europa expansions, as well as a magazine dedicated to the series, and in 1989 GR/D acquired the rights to the series. They published collectors' editions of the Europa games, as well as beginning two more series focusing on the Pacific War and World War I.

The Europa Winter War Game was designed by Gary Stagliano, friend of John Astell. He was partly Finnish and grew up in the Upper Peninsula of Michigan. He was an avid gamer and highly interested in military history.

In 2001, GR/D was purchased by Mill Creek Ventures (principal owner Carl Kleihege).

In 2004, Mill Creek sold GR/D to Historical Military Services.
