= Rich Banner =

American board game designer

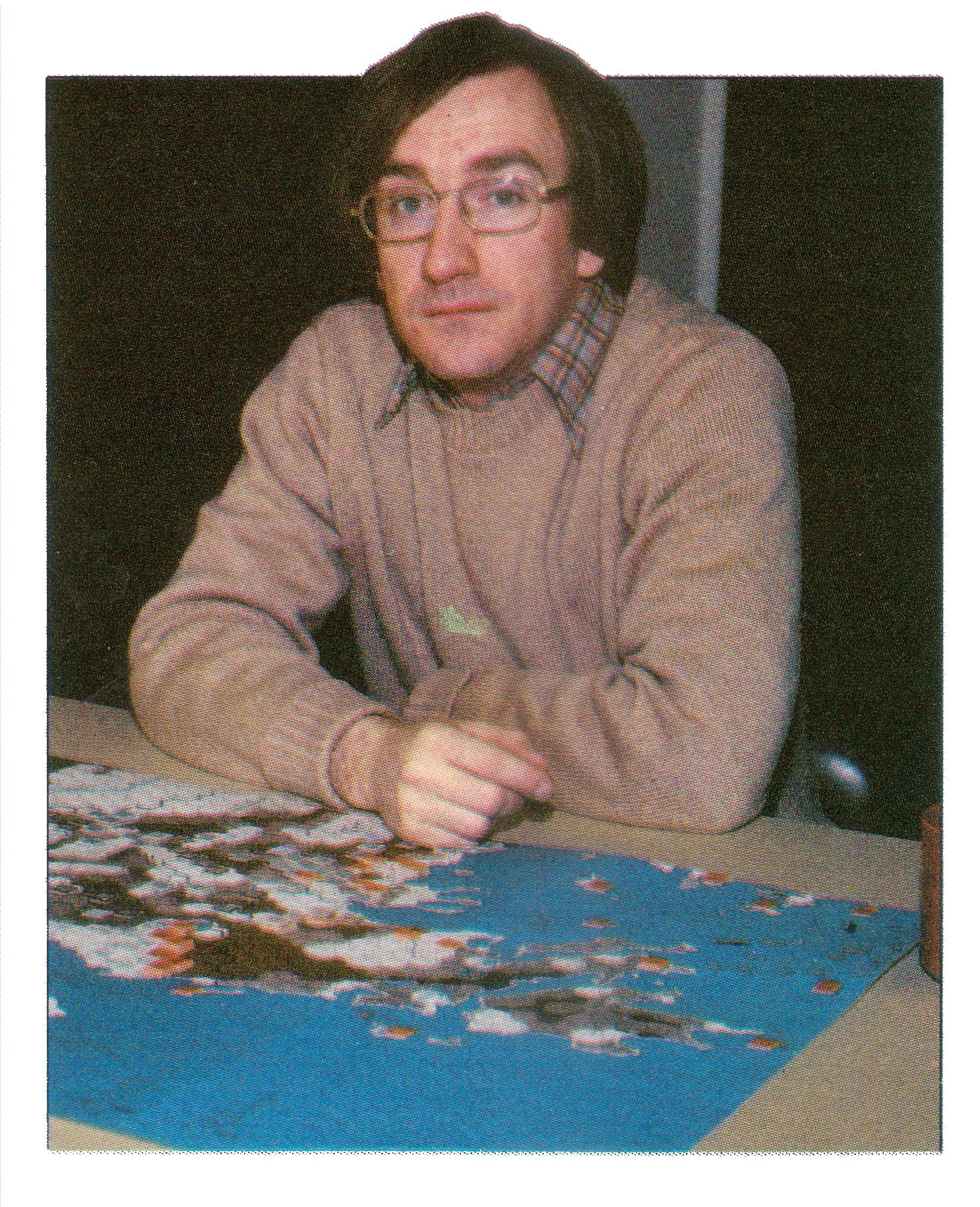
- Rich Banner in 1980
- Born: Paul Richard Banner; United States
- Occupations: Game designer, graphic artist

Paul Richard "Rich" Banner is an American game designer and graphic artist.

== Beginnings ==
Rich Banner and Frank Chadwick formed the ISU Game Club at the Illinois State University (Normal, Illinois). Banner engineered a grant which funded the printing of blank hex sheets (suitable for making wargame maps) and they began drafting a variety of designs, some derivative of existing games at the time, and some original concepts.

In 1973, Illinois State University, under a program to fund educational innovation, created SimRAD (Simulation Research, Analysis, and Design), which designed games for implementation in the college classroom. At about the same time, Banner and Chadwick, along with newcomers Marc Miller and Loren Wiseman, decided to publish a massive World War II simulation game, and founded Game Designers' Workshop as their publishing company. As university funding dried up for SimRAD, the three shifted their attention to the commercial sector.

== Game Designers' Workshop ==
Game Designers' Workshop (using the plural possessive to reflect the three partners) adopted as its birthdate June 22, 1973. In that year, GDW published Banner and Chadwick's Drang Nach Osten! (the first of its Europa Series on World War II), Triplanetary, and Unentschieden (the sequel to Drang Nach Osten!). In 1974, the company published five new titles, including Chaco, Eagles, Narvik, Torgau and Coral Sea.

Banner's position was art director, and his knowledge of printing and graphic design shaped GDW's public image and the appearance of its games. His graphic vision for Chadwick's Avalanche (a game of the Salerno landings in World War II) won him the Charles S. Roberts Award for Best Graphics in 1976. His graphics for the System 7 (printed Napoleonics Miniatures) won him the H G Wells Award for Best Historical Figure Series in 1979 (and Chadwick received the companion H G Wells Award for Best Miniatures Rules for 1979).

Banner is credited as co-designer on six of the 11 original Europa Series of World War II wargames.

He was honored as a "famous game designer" by being featured as the king of diamonds in Flying Buffalo's 2010 Famous Game Designers Playing Card Deck.

== Game Manufacturers' Association ==
Banner was the first treasurer (1977–78) for the newly formed Game Manufacturers' Association, and its second president (1978-1981). During his tenure, the Association established its basic goals of promoting and protecting the game manufacturing industry, and oversaw the creation of the annual GAMA trade show.
