= Frank Chadwick =

American game designer and author

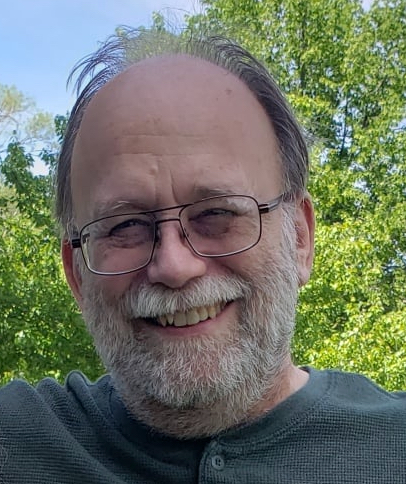
- Chadwick in 2021
- Born: United States
- Occupations: Game designer, author

Frank Chadwick is an American game designer and New York Times best selling author. He has designed hundreds of games, his most notable being the role-playing games En Garde!, Space: 1889 and Twilight 2000, and the wargame series Europa and The Third World War, as well as creating Traveller with Marc Miller. He has won multiple awards for his work.

== Beginnings ==
Chadwick formed the ISU Game Club at Illinois State University with Rich Banner. The club focused on wargaming, but the students also began designing games as a fun activity and were able to convince the university to fund a new program called SIMRAD ("SIMulation Research And Design"), with the intent of aiding instructors to produce specifications for simulation games. They used their club funding to design war games. They also formed a small educational games organization in response to a project by the university to bring new ideas into the system. After failing to win this project, Chadwick and Banner, along with newcomers Marc Miller and Loren Wiseman, continued to work together, forming Game Designers' Workshop. When ISU stopped funding SIMRAD after 18 months, Miller, Chadwick, and Banner founded Game Designers' Workshop on June 22, 1973, as a commercial outlet for their creations, initially headquartering the company in Chadwick's and Miller's apartment.

== Game Designers' Workshop ==
There is little doubt that, even in the rather busy pantheon of (wargame) industry heroes, Frank Chadwick is a Zeus amongst the Ajaxes. He is one of—if not THE—finest game designer working today. Since GDW's emergence in the mid-1970s, Chadwick has been GDW's main designer, producing a body of work remarkable for its breadth and width. ... ever resourceful, Frank C covered his simulated butt with the out-of-sight success of his Desert Shield Fact Book. Its reported, six-figure sales will probably bank-roll the company for the next decade. And, as if that weren't enough, he has steered GDW (admittedly with the astute help of others) from a small-town, Third World company to its status as one of the major simulation and RPG publishers in the market today. Frank is also president of the industry professional association, the Game Manufacturers Association, so GDW's tentacles reach out to almost every cave in which hobbyists can hide in. If dice produced olive oil, there is no doubt that Frank Chadwick would be wargaming's Godfather.

—Richard Berg, 13 time Charles S. Roberts Award winner, in Berg's Review of Games, issue #3, Spring 1992

Game Designers' Workshop existed from 1973 until 1996. There, he designed several well-known and award-winning games, including En Garde! (first swashbuckling role-playing games) in 1975, Space: 1889 in 1989 (which was set in a steampunk milieu before the term was coined), and Twilight 2000 in 1984. Chadwick and Miller designed Traveller. Game Designers' Workshop also published the Gulf War Fact Book, a book he wrote on the military capabilities of the United States and Iraq at the time of the Gulf War. The book was on The New York Times bestselling list, and led to appearances on various news programs by Chadwick. After the closure of Game Designers' Workshop, Chadwick got the rights to Space: 1889.

== After Game Designers' Workshop ==
Chadwick has written blogs on history and military issues at Greathistory.com.

== Awards and recognition ==
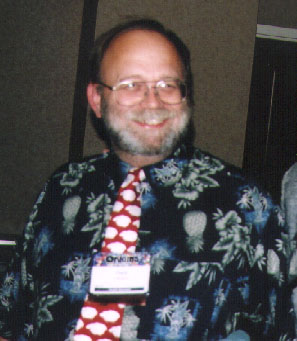
Chadwick at the 2005 Origins game convention

Chadwick won numerous awards, including induction into the Charles Roberts Awards Hall of Fame and Origins Hall of Fame in 1984. He won a Charles S. Roberts Award in 1980, 1981 and 1989, was nominated for an Origins Award in 2009.

== Works ==
Below are some of Chadwick's most notable works.

=== Design credits ===
- 1973: Drang Nach Osten! (Europa), wargame, with Rich Banner
- 1975: En Garde!, RPG, with Darryl Hany
- 1975: 1815: The Waterloo Campaign, wargame, with John Astell
- 1977: Imperium, wargame, with John Harshman and Marc W. Miller
- 1977: Traveller, RPG, with Marc W. Miller, John Harshman, Loren K. Wiseman, and many others
- 1980: Tacforce, miniatures board wargame, with Marc W. Miller- CSR Award Winner
- 1980: Azhanti High Lightning, boardgame linked to Traveller RPG, with Marc Miller
- 1981: A House Divided, wargame, two-time CSR Award Winner
- 1981: Striker (Traveller), miniatures wargame
- 1981: Suez '73, wargame
- 1983: Assault, wargame
- 1984: The Third World War, wargame
- 1984: Fire in the East (Europa), wargame, with John Astell and Rich Banner
- 1984: Twilight: 2000, RPG, with John Astell, John Harshman, Loren K. Wiseman
- 1988: Space: 1889, RPG, with Marc W. Miller and others
- 1988,1992,1997: Command Decision, miniatures wargame
- 1994: Volley and Bayonet, miniatures wargame
- 2006: Command Decision: Test of Battle, miniatures wargame, with Glenn Kidd

=== Fiction ===
==== Space: 1889 & Beyond series ====
- 2012: A Prince of Mars, Untreed Reads Publishing, B007CQDAPM, novella and book five of the Space: 1889 & Beyond series.
- 2012: Dark Side of Luna, Untreed Reads Publishing, B007WUK8MQ, novel and book six of the Space: 1889 & Beyond series, co-written with JT Wilson.
- 2012: Conspiracy of Silence, Untreed Reads Publishing, ASIN B008XQT0TU, novel and book seven of the Space: 1889 & Beyond series, co-written with Andy Frankham-Allen.
- 2014: The Forever Engine, Baen Books, ISBN 978-1-62579-221-1, time travel novel set in a divergent Space: 1889 universe (serves as something of a prequel to Space: 1889 & Beyond, and shares some of the same characters as Conspiracy of Silence).

==== Cottohazz series ====
1. (2013) How Dark the World Becomes, Baen Books, ISBN 978-1-4516-3870-7, science fiction crime novel
2. (2015) Come the Revolution, Baen Books, ISBN 978-1476780955, science fiction sequel to How Dark the World Becomes
3. (2017) Chain of Command. Baen Books, ISBN 9781481482974, science fiction, set in the same universe as How Dark the World Becomes and Come the Revolution, but with new characters.
4. (2020) Ship of Destiny, Baen Books, ISBN 978-1982124434, sequel to Chain of Command
