= Arab–Israeli Wars (game) =

1977 Board wargame

The Arab-Israeli Wars, subtitled "Tank Battles in the Mideast 1956–73", is a board wargame published by Avalon Hill in 1977 that simulates various battles during the Suez Crisis, Six-Day War and Yom Kippur War.

== Description ==
Arab-Israeli Wars is a 2-player tactical level wargame that uses a variation of the rules from Avalon Hill's previously published PanzerBlitz (1970).

=== Components ===
The game box includes:

- 20-page rulebook
- scenario sheet
- 504 die-cut counters
- four 8" x 17" mounted geomorphic hex grid maps scaled at 250 m (270 yd) per hex including a "Canal" map for scenarios fought along the Suez Canal

=== Gameplay ===
The game system uses a standard "I go, You go" alternating sequence of play: one player moves their units and fires, and then the other player does the same, completing one turn.

=== Scenarios ===
The game has twenty-four scenarios. Most of them based on historical battles, but one examines what might have happened if certain factors in a particular battle were changed, and two are hypothetical future battles. The scenarios are presented in increasing order of complexity so that those new to the game can learn a few rules at a time as they play each scenario.

== Publication history ==
Avalon Hill published the highly successful PanzerBlitz in 1970, a tactical simulation of tank warfare during World War II. This was followed by another World War II simulation, Panzer Leader, in 1974. To update the rules for the faster tanks, guided missiles, and modern aircraft of the 1960s and 1970s, Russell Vane and Seth Carus revised and expanded the PanzerBlitz rules, resulting in The Arab-Israeli Wars, which was published by Avalon Hill in 1977 with artwork by Randall C. Reed.

== Reception ==
In his 1977 book The Comprehensive Guide to Board Wargaming, Nicholas Palmer approvingly noted the inclusion of "all the modern weaponry available in the Middle East."

In Issue 17 of the British wargaming magazine Perfidious Albion, Charles Vasey and Geoffrey Barnard discussed this game. Vasey commented, "I find it an enjoyable game. I feel some scenarios need a lot of study to find the correct tactics." Barnard noted, "While Arab-Israeli Wars is a definite improvement in terms of detail and realism over Panzer Leader, which in turn was an improvement over PanzerBlitz, I feel that in terms of my personal enjoyment, each game has been successively an increasingly retrograde step. ... But then maybe I have gotten too used to Panzerbush to readily accept the open space of AIW." Vasey replied, "In Panzerblitz the thick cover and vast moves allowed far too much movement, it might be the dream of the armour fetishist but it has little truth in reality. These differences will probably mean the game appeals more to the Mech War '77 fans than to old Pansy-hands."

In Issue 55 of Moves, Ian Chadwick called it "an easy, fun game to learn and play, presented to players in formats of increasing complexity and heightened realism." He concluded by grading the game A for playability, C for component quality and C for historical accuracy, saying, "Gamers new to the system will find it a full, varied course offering many hours of enjoyable gaming, but those of us more used to playing PanzerBlitz and Leader may not be so enthralled with the system."

In Issue 13 of The Journal of 20th Century Wargaming, Marion Bates pointed out that the PanzerBlitz system developed in 1970 was already out of date by the Yom Kippur War of 1973, saying, "The state of the art had simply moved on. The Arab-Israeli system, refurbished with some rudimentary morale rules, teaches little about modern combat." Bate concluded the game was too far out of date to be useful, writing, "The title is mostly balanced and provides some entertaining gaming, but offers little in the way of simulation. Stick to backgammon."

In the 1980 book The Complete Book of Wargames, game designer Jon Freeman thought "while if in not in some ways as successful or as satisfying as its preeminent forefather [PanzerBlitz], The Arab-Israeli Wars is nonetheless a good tactical game." Freeman also thought the game system was outdated, saying, "The main problem is that the system is becoming a little tired, and players may feel they are just getting some new scenarios for an old game." He also noted that "While some of these scenarios are exciting, many are dull and unwieldy." Although he concluded by giving the game an Overall Evaluation of "Good", he recommended that players instead try October War by Simulations Publications Inc. as "more accurate and innovative."

In The Guide to Simulations/Games for Education and Training, Martin Campion discussed how to use the game in a classroom setting, and suggested "a chain of command system can be used. The commander-in-chief on each side should be provided with a separate map and not allowed to look at the actual playing field. Moves on each side should be timed, and players on one side should not be allowed to view the board while the other side is moving."

== Other reviews and commentary ==
- Campaign #80
- Strategy & Tactics #61
- Fire & Movement #8
- Perfidious Albion #21
