= Red Star/White Star: Tactical Combat in Europe in the 1970s =

1972 Cold War board wargame

Red Star/White Star: Tactical Combat in Europe in the 1970s is a board wargame published by Simulations Publications Inc. (SPI) at the height of the Cold War in 1972 that simulates hypothetical battles in West Germany between Warsaw Pact invaders and NATO defenders.

== Description ==
Red Star/White Star, referring to the red star on Soviet tanks and the white star on American tanks, is a two-player board wargame, where one player controls Warsaw Pact forces trying to invade West Germany, and the other the NATO forces (Americans and West Germans) trying to stop the invaders. The game posits an attack on West Germany, and contains ten scenarios simulating various parts of the overall battle.

=== Gameplay ===
Red Star/White Star uses an alternating series of turns. The first player completes these phases:

1. Indirect Fire/Air Strike
2. Movement
3. Close Assault
4. Other player: Defensive Fire

The other player then has the same opportunities. This completes one game turn, which represents six minutes and forty seconds of the battle. Weapons and technology date to when the game was published in the early 1970s, and include wire-guided missiles, rocket launchers and helicopter gunships. With many weapons systems, and units as small as platoons, the game has been called "highly complex."

== Publication history ==
Jim Dunnigan founded the small publisher wargame publisher Poultron Press in 1969, and changed the name to Simulations Publications in 1971. The new company produced a series of wargames of approximately the same scale and using similar rules, all designed by Dunnigan: Tactical Game 3 (sold to Avalon Hill and republished as PanzerBlitz), Combat Command, Red Star/White Star, Kampfpanzer, and Desert War. Red Star/White Star was published in 1972 with graphic design by Redmond A. Simonsen.

=== Reception ===
Writing for The Pouch, Nicholas Ulanov felt the game "works better than PanzerBlitz." But Ulanov felt the game suffered because of an imbalance in favor of the Americans, saying, "If the NATO forces did not have such a great advantage over the Russians, the game would be excellent."

In his 1977 book The Comprehensive Guide to Board Wargaming, Nicky Palmer listed the many weapons systems and unit sizes down to platoons, and noted "the total effect is highly complex."

In The Guide to Simulations/Games for Education and Training, Martin Campion also felt there was a pro-NATO bias, questioning the premise that "five M60A1 American tanks are superior to ten T62 Russian tanks. And that is hard to believe."

=== Other reviews and commentary ===
- Strategy & Tactics #36
- JagdPanther #3
- Panzerfaust #74
- Fire & Movement #15
