= Tactical wargame =

Type of wargame that models military conflict at a tactical level

Tactical wargames are a type of wargame that models military conflict at a tactical level, i.e. units range from individual vehicles and squads to platoons or companies. These units are rated based on types and ranges of individual weaponry. The first tactical wargames were played as miniatures, extended to board games, and they are now also played as video games.

The games are designed so that a knowledge of military tactics will facilitate good gameplay. Tactical wargames offer more of a challenge to the designer, as fewer variables or characteristics inherent in the units being simulated are directly quantifiable. Modern commercial board wargaming avoided tactical subjects for many years, but since initial attempts at the subject appeared, it has remained a favourite topic among wargamers. Perhaps the most successful board wargaming system ever designed, Advanced Squad Leader, is set at the tactical level.

== Miniatures-based wargames ==
Tactical wargame rules have appeared for every period of human history and even into the future. The first true "miniatures" games may have developed in antiquity, though Kriegsspiel, a command study invented in 18th century Prussia, is generally accepted as the first true miniatures game. Commercially available miniatures, however, only became popular at the start of the 20th century.

=== Naval miniatures ===
Jane's published several sets of rules for naval games in the early to mid-20th century.

=== Land-based miniatures ===
The number of land-based tactical miniatures games produced for the commercial market increased exponentially following the Second World War as interest in that conflict and disposable income increased.

== Combat resolution systems ==
Various games have different methods for resolution of combat results, a central core dynamic for any wargame.

=== Attacker-defender ratio ===
The wargame Panzerblitz is a leading game in the genre of tactical wargames, and was an iconic new type of game when published by Avalon Hill in 1970. In this game, each unit has an attack strength and a defense strength. To resolve combat, the attacker's attack rating and the defender's defense rating are calculated into a simple ratio; the result is rounded off in the defender's favor. One die is rolled. The Combat Results Table provides the result for the dice roll; the results can range from "no effect" to partial damage, or another role, or complete destruction of the unit being attacked.

=== Attack and defense values ===
The game series Axis and Allies includes some games that are tactical in nature, such as Axis & Allies: Battle of the Bulge and Axis & Allies: D-Day. In all Axis and Allies games, each unit has an attack value and a defense value. During a single attack, each attacking unit gets one dice roll and each defending unit gets one dice roll. If a dice result is the same or less than the appropriate value, then that unit destroys the enemy. it is possible for both units to be destroyed using this system.

== Tactical board wargames ==
=== History ===
The genesis of tactical board wargaming goes back to 1969. Up until that time, wargaming—which in the modern, recreational form only dated back to 1958—tended to concentrate on operational and strategic subjects. Charles S. Roberts of Avalon Hill had developed a wide range of strategic wargames based upon historical battles—the first of these being the 1961 releases of Gettysburg and Chancellorsville, issued to coincide with the beginning of the centennial celebration of the American Civil War. AH issued a wide range of similar games in the years that followed, and established itself as the market leader in board wargames. However, most of these games were at the army, brigade, battalion, or regiment level. Few were at the more tactical levels.

Tactical Game 3 was introduced by Strategy & Tactics magazine as a platoon/company level game focusing on tactics on the Eastern Front. In 1970, that game's designer, the legendary James F. Dunnigan, sold the rights to the game to Avalon Hill, who quickly released PanzerBlitz. This was the start of the so-called "Second Generation" of wargaming. PanzerBlitz eventually sold 250,000 copies, though it was not without critics (including Dunnigan himself).

In the early 1970s, several tactical games made their way onto the expanding wargaming market, including Grunt (1971) featuring platoon-level warfare in Vietnam and Combat Command: Platoon-Company Combat, France, 1944 (1972) billed as a western front sequel to PanzerBlitz, and Soldiers (1972) about World War I, all by Dunnigan/SPI. Dunnigan then crossed another boundary and became the first publisher to release a game on the then-ongoing Cold War, called Red Star/White Star: Tactical Combat in Western Europe in the 1970s. While the game was successful, Dunnigan was disappointed with it, citing difficulties in realistically portraying tactical combat in a tabletop board game.

Dunnigan tried to take tactical games into a new direction in 1973 with KampfPanzer and Desert War, which featured simultaneous movement, expanding on an optional rule for PanzerBlitz. Unfortunately, the quest for greater realism was having a price in complexity and "bookkeeping", or recording of moves on paper. Nonetheless, other tactical games on a man to man level were released with simultaneous movement, with Sniper! being released by SPI in 1973, Patrol!: Man to Man Combat in the 20th Century and Tank!: Armored Combat in the 20th Century both in 1974. That same year, Avalon Hill released Panzer Leader: The Game of Tactical Warfare on the Western Front 1944-45.

The problems with true tactical (company/battalion level) games were all too apparent. According to Lorrin Bird, writing in Special Issue #2 of Campaign Magazine:

The major disappointment with the three major Avalon Hill games (Panzer Leader, PanzerBlitz and Arab-Israeli Wars) was the obvious sequential nature of the whole situation. A shoots, A moves. B shoots, B moves. With a little opportunity fire thrown in. In situations like the Battle of Kursk in Panzer Blitz confronting the enemy meant possible extinction. The hardest part to accept was the situation where three German tanks block a pass and cannot be seen by the T-34s on their combat phase. On the Russian move they move up to the Mark IVs and have to stop. The T-34 move might have taken only a two-hex advance (500 metres) and then they idle their engines for the next 5 minutes. On the next German move, the Mark IVs cleverly dart away, in and out of cover and take position again. The T-34s...move a few hexes, stop and idle, awaiting the German movement which frees up the next few hexes for them. Another funny situation is where a Tiger unit sits in the open and a Sherman comes out of nowhere and ends up adjacent to the Germans. With ideal conditions, the Tiger can decimate the Shermans in no time flat without any "defensive" fire by the M-4s at all, and then move off....While Panzer Blitz, Panzer Leader and Arab-Israeli Wars are wonderful games, and demand a high degree of tactical ability to play, victory can be obtained in a manner very often that runs contrary to reason and a player's intelligence...

This much anticipated sequel to PanzerBlitz was successful, and the next year SPI replaced their earlier titles with games featuring a new "Simultaneous-Sequential-Play-System", eliminating the bookkeeping involved in games like KampfPanzer and Tank and attempting to address the problems described by Bird, above. And so MechWar '77 replaced the earlier Red Star/White Star, Panzer '44 replaced Combat Command, and Search & Destroy replaced Grunt.

The new Simultaneous-Sequential-Play-System (SSPS) allowed for much greater realism without sacrificing playability, and was considered the new "state of the art" for tactical wargames. The first era of tactical wargaming had come to an end. The new state of the art was extended to Avalon Hill's Tobruk in 1976, as well as SPI's Firefight. But neither game did well, with increased realism in the form of detailed penetration tables in Tobruk and rigid rules for modern Soviet doctrine forced on the players of Firefight making games once again less playable. Tobruk also suffered from an unattractive map surface which depicted basically flat terrain.

Another point for players of tactical wargames to consider was the increasing amount of unit data that was being built into the games. Rather than pieces depicting generic "infantry" or "cavalry" units as in Civil War strategy games, for example, games like Tobruk were inundating players with tables of complex ballistics information. Firefight came with a separate booklet on "Reference Data" amounting to 20 pages of information, much of it not immediately necessary for gameplay but certainly useful to defend some of the design decisions which restricted game play.

At this point, Avalon Hill approached developer John Hill to "do a game like Tank! (but) a squad level game...." Hill was well known, and had recently written an article in Moves entitled "Designing for Playability." He had recently published BarLev and Battle for Hue.^{[1]}

=== Squad Leader ===
The result was Squad Leader, which went on to become the best selling tactical wargame ever, spawning three add-ons (called "gamettes" by Avalon Hill) and an Advanced version which produced twelve "official" core modules, several historically based modules, a solitaire version, and hundreds of third party add-ons and variants.

Squad Leader, released in 1977, used a semi-simultaneous system as well, focusing on infantry combat. The physical components for the game were unmatched in terms of quality, using full color painted mapboards on rigid mountings that had the added advantage of being geomorphic. As the Squad Leader game system grew and more boards were added, they could be set up in a variety of configurations and used to represent a wide array of units, as the infantry counters were generic and did not portray specific units. Some innovative rules for such things as leadership and "penetrating fire" (to simulate the ability of automatic weapons on the battlefield to engage more than just one target) were introduced.

Some observers felt Squad Leader was too romantic a view of infantry combat. Bird felt that the game "completely sidesteps the effect of widespread panic and morale breakdowns (contagious hysteria), and treats every soldier as if he were totally dedicated to the cause..."^{[2]} Others felt that games like Search & Destroy received short shrift.

Few tactical games during (the 1970s) are comparable to Squad Leader ... which is quite popular and is of a similar scale (to S&D), but has a needlessly complex combat system, leadership rules that would be more appropriate for 18th Century combat and ridiculously simplistic casualty rules...The wargame industry has basically ignored the more accurate portrayal of company level combat in S&D for the more glamorous version portrayed in Squad Leader.^{[3]}

Even the developers of Squad Leader admitted that "our troops assault with a tenacity that would make Kelly's Heroes proud."^{[4]}

=== Squad Leader vs. Tobruk ===
The Tobruk game released by Avalon Hill prior to Squad Leader got little support from gamers or AH. "With the exception of a few articles and scenarios in The General, there was never a follow-on game or expansion product for Tobruk enthusiasts. We now have the benefit of hindsight to point to the years between the release of Squad Leader and its progeny Cross of Iron through GI: Anvil of Victory represented AH's commitment to tactical-level World War II gaming. As most readers are aware, that series led to ASL, followed by its own progeny over the years. Thus, one should not be the least bit surprised that Tobruk appeared to be expendable circa 1987, a year that happened to be the height of the ASL craze." ^{[5]}

In fact, Hal Hock (developer of Tobruk) and Don Greenwood and John Hill (developers of Squad Leader) compared the merits of the two games shortly after the release of the latter in the pages of The General.^{[6]} It was made clear that the two game systems were quite different, and as time passed it was clear which game Avalon Hill preferred to support. In July 1987, as alluded to above, Avalon Hill sold the rights to Tobruk back to Hal Hock.

Some of the challenges facing designers of tactical wargames were also made clear in that article, which contrasted Hill's "design for effect" philosophy with the more data-driven philosophy of Hock:

Hill's is the artistic approach akin to the impressionistic school of painting where subjects are abstracted until the overall effect on the viewer is such that the artist can will his impressions upon the viewer. Hence, an artistic designer studies history with concern for the overall battlefield environment and how each specific weapon relates to it, as opposed to proving ground statistics. Regardless of a weapon's value, if the soldier wielding it has confidence in his handling of the weapon and its overall effectiveness, his performance will be greatly enhanced. He subscribes to the opinion in vogue these days in battlefield research that technical differences of weapons is not nearly as important as the psychological perception of the individual using the weapon...

Hock is the scientist and indeed has been employed in such a capacity by the government. He believes that since a battle is primarily a clash of technology, it can be measured. Proving ground data is his bible. Armor actions can be studied by careful study of "projectile penetration" vs. armor....The artist responds that this shell vs. armor test does not always hold true in the battlefield environment...The artist concludes...that when shell hits armor, anything (such as hits on vision ports, slung equipment, oblique angles, variable metal quality of cast armor, etc.) can happen and that only a most generalized statement of probability can be made.

=== Other land-based wargames ===
Nonetheless, while Squad Leader progressed into Advanced Squad Leader ("ASL") in 1985, other titles also appeared, none of whom managed to gain the popularity that Squad Leader/ASL had gained. Perhaps the downturn in the wargaming industry is also to blame for that, as videogame consoles and computer games became more sophisticated and offered greater appeal than previously to those who enjoyed board wargaming as an intellectual challenge. West End Games introduced Eastern Front Tank Leader (also designed by John Hill) in 1986, followed by Western Front Tank Leader in 1987 and Desert Steel in 1989. The same year, Avalon Hill offered up a modern tactical game in MBT, only superficially similar to Squad Leader as it simulated a different era of tactical combat. Another game, IDF, appeared in 1993 that used the same rules as MBT, changing the setting from a fictional World War Three in Germany to the Middle East and the Arab–Israeli conflicts.

Panzer Command by Victory Games in 1984 tried to address some of the problems Bird had mentioned in the Campaign article mentioned above. Robert Kern reported (in Fire & Movement Number 49 (Jul/Aug 1986)) that: "Experimentation is the main reason why our games have been so successful. Not only do we try to simplify game systems as much as possible, but we also tear systems apart to see if something new can be created from them. Panzer Command, for example, does not use a strict sequence of play; rather, portions of the game turn are on chits which are drawn at random."

Other significant product lines appeared by producers GDW and Clash of Arms Games ("CofA"). GDW focused on the Cold War or World War III period with Team Yankee, the first product of its First Battle Series line of games. Later offerings moved this system to cover several post-Cold war scenarios, such as Desert Storm, and also back to Second World War. CofA produced Landships! which covers the First World War, primarily focusing on the appearance of tanks during the later years on the Western Front. Subsequent expansions moved the system to cover the Russian Civil War and CofA intends to move the series up to 1939, covering the Chaco War, the Spanish Civil War and the German invasion of Poland in World War II.

Other producers have also produced small unit tactical board wargames covering earlier eras such as the Roman Empire, the Napoleonic Wars and the American Civil War. However, with the exception of Avalon Hill's The Siege of Jerusalem, none of these games have met with much success. Note however, grand tactical board war games have extraordinary followings, especially The Gamers' series of games covering the American Civil War and CofA's La Bataille series covering the Napoleonic Wars and the Seven Years' War. GMT Games has also had considerable success with its Great Battles of History series. These series though use larger units, usually at the battalion or regimental level.

=== Land-based games published 1969–1994 ===
- Tactical Game 3 (Poultron Press, 1969) – later published as PanzerBlitz
- PanzerBlitz (Avalon Hill, 1970)
- Grunt (Issue 26 of Strategy & Tactics, 1971)
- Combat Command (Issue 30 of S&T)
- Soldiers (Simulations Publications, Inc. (SPI) (1972)
- Red Star/White Star (SPI, 1972)
- KampfPanzer (Issue 41 of S&T, 1973)
- Desert War (SPI, 1973)
- Sniper! (SPI, 1973)
- Battle for Hue (Simulations Design Corporation, 1973)
- Patrol (SPI, 1974)
- Tank! (Issue 44 of S&T, 1974)
- Panzer Leader (Avalon Hill, 1974)
- Search & Destroy (SPI, 1975)
- Panzer '44 (SPI, 1974)
- MechWar '77 (SPI, 1975)
- FireFight (SPI, 1976)
- H-Hour (Balboa Game Company, 1976)
- Tobruk (Avalon Hill, 1976)
- SuperTank (Strategic and Tactical Studies, 1976)
- Squad Leader (Avalon Hill, 1977)
- Arab/Israeli Wars (Avalon Hill, 1977)
- October War (Issue 61 of S&T, 1977)
- Trenchfoot (Unknown, 1977)
- Raid (Issue 64 of S&T)
- Cross of Iron (Avalon Hill, 1978) – Squad Leader expansion
- Commando (SPI, 1979) – role playing game
- Panzer Battles (Issue 73 of S&T, 1979)
- Panzer (Yaquinto, 1979)
- 88 (Yaquinto, 1979)
- City Fight (SPI, 1979)
- Mech War 2 (SPI, 1979)
- Crescendo of Doom (Avalon Hill, 1980) – Squad Leader expansion
- Armor (Yaquinto, 1980)
- Beachhead (Yaquinto, 1980)
- Storm Over Arnhem (Avalon Hill, 1981) – area movement game
- GI: Anvil of Victory (Avalon Hill, 1982) – Squad Leader expansion
- Combat (Game Forms, 1982)
- Up Front (Avalon Hill, 1983) – card game
- Close Assault (Yaquinto, 1983)
- Commando Actions (Yaquinto, 1983)
- Rapid Deployment Force (Yaquinto, 1983)
- Assault (GDW, 1983)
- Ambush! (Victory Games, 1983)
- Firepower (Avalon Hill, 1984)
- Boots & Saddles (GDW, 1984)
- Move Out! (Victory Games, 1984) – Ambush! add on
- Panzer Command (Victory Games, 1984)
- Ranger (Omega Games, 1985)
- Advanced Squad Leader (Avalon Hill, 1985) – rule book only
- Beyond Valor (Avalon Hill, 1985) – ASL module
- Streets of Fire (Avalon Hill 1985) – ASL module
- Purple Heart (Victory Games, 1985) – Ambush! add on
- Paratrooper (Avalon Hill, 1986) – ASL module
- Air Cav (Victory Games, 1986)
- Eastern Front Tank Leader (West End Games, 1986)
- Battle Hymn (Victory Games, 1986)
- Battle Cry (World Wide Wargamers, 1986)
- Bundeswehr (GDW, 1986)
- Sniper! 2nd Edition (TSR/SPI, 1986)
- FireTeam (West End Games, 1987)
- Soldiers (West End Games, 1987)
- Team Yankee (GDW, 1987)
- Western Front Tank Leader (West End Games, 1987)
- Raid on St-Nazaire (Avalon Hill, 1987) – solitaire game
- Yanks (Avalon Hill, 1987) – ASL module
- Silver Star (Victory Games, 1987) – Ambush! add on
- Desert Steel (West End Games, 1989 – Charles S. Roberts Award for Best WWII Wargame)
- Battlefield: Europe (GDW, 1991)
- Sands of War (GDW, 1993)
- Landships! (Clash of Arms, 1993)

=== Advanced Tobruk and Advanced Squad Leader ===
In 2002, Advanced Tobruk was released by game manufacturer Critical Hit, Inc. This game was a makeover from the original, and Raymond J. Tapio, who had been designing third party ASL add-ons for sale by his company Critical Hit, conversed with original designer Hal Hock in 1998 and decided, with Kurt Martin, to re-release the game. Tobruk was expanded into a system covering the entire Second World War at the tactical level, with a game scale similar to Squad Leader, 50 metres per hex and counters depicting individual squads and vehicles. The Advanced Tobruk System ("ATS") proved to be very popular, with several expansion modules being produced. Graphic quality of the components was high. The system has gone on to cover battles from the Spanish Civil War through the Korean War, with rumors of a World War I expansion, and even a version of the American Civil War.

In 2006, the final component for Advanced Squad Leader, Armies of Oblivion, went to press, completing the last of twelve essential "core modules" covering every major combatant army, vehicle and ordnance type of the Second World War. It is unclear which direction new projects will take ASL, although there are some indications are that a modern version may be in the offing, other sources suggest more Historical Advanced Squad Leader modules will be the future direction. The long rumoured World War I expansion module appears to have been cancelled, however it may eventually be produced by a third-party manufacturer. Critical Hit has however recently produced several unofficial expansion modules, introducing the system to cover the Spanish Civil War, the Arab–Israeli wars of 1948 and 1956 and the French–Vietnamese war during the 1950s.

=== Sea-based ===
Several game manufacturers have produced tactical wargames covering naval warfare. Due to the scales of these battles, most games tend to be miniatures-based without boards, and several popular rules systems have appeared. However, several board versions have been produced over the past forty years, with most games focusing either on the Napoleonic Era or the first half of the 20th century.

Pre-1750

- Trireme (Avalon Hill) 1974
- War Galley (GMT Games) 1999
- Salamis – expansion for War Galley (GMT Games) 1999

Napoleonic Era (1750–1850)

- Frigate: Sea War in the Age of Sail (SPI) 1974
- Wooden Ships & Iron Men (Avalon Hill)
- Enemy in Sight (Avalon Hill)
- Close Action (Clash of Arms) 1996
- Rebel Seas – expansion for Close Action (Clash of Arms) 2001
- Flying Colors (GMT Games) 2005

American Civil War/Industrialized Era (1850–1898)

- Ironclad (Yaquinto Games)
- Ironclads: Hearts of Iron (Avalanche Press) 2007 (not released yet)

World War I Era (1898–1930)

- Jutland (Avalon Hill) 1967
- Dreadnought: Surface Combat In The Battleship Era, 1906-45 (SPI) 1975
- Great War at Sea: Vol 1 - The Mediterranean (Avalanche Press) 1996
- Great War at Sea: Vol 2 - The North Sea (Avalanche Press) 1998
- Great War at Sea: U.S. Navy Plan Orange (Avalanche Press) 1998
- Great War at Sea: 1904-1905: The Russo-Japanese War (Avalanche Press) 1999
- Great War at Sea: U.S. Navy Plan Black (Avalanche Press) 1999
- Great War at Sea: 1898: The Spanish–American War (Avalanche Press) 2000
- Great War at Sea: U.S. Navy Plan Red (Avalanche Press) 2002
- Great War at Sea: Cruiser Warfare (Avalanche Press) 2004
- Great War at Sea: Jutland (Avalanche Press) 2006 (New version of Vol 2)
- Great War at Sea: U.S. Navy Plan Gold (Avalanche Press) 2006
- Great War at Sea: Cone of Fire (Avalanche Press) 2008

World War II Era (1930–1945)

- 'CA', Tactical Naval Warfare in the Pacific 1941-43 (SPI) 1973
- IJN (Simulations Canada) 1978
- Torpedo! (Simulations Canada) 1979
- Kriegsmarine (Simulations Canada) 1980
- Ironbottom Sound (Quarterdeck Games) 1981
- Destroyer Captain (Quarterdeck Games) 1982
- The Royal Navy (Quarterdeck Games) 1983
- Schnellboote (Simulations Canada) 1984
- Second World War at Sea: SOPAC (Avalanche Press) 1999
- Second World War at Sea: Eastern Fleet (Avalanche Press) 2001
- Second World War at Sea: Bomb Alley (Avalanche Press) 2002
- Second World War at Sea: Strike South (Avalanche Press) 2005
- Second World War at Sea: Leyte Gulf (Avalanche Press) 2006
- Second World War at Sea: Bismarck (Avalanche Press) 2006

Post-war Era (1945–Present)

- Missile Boat (Rand Games Assoc) 1974
- SSN (Game Designer's Workshop) 1975
- Raketny Kreyser (Simulations Canada) 1977

=== Air-based ===
Several board-based tactical wargames have also appeared for aerial warfare, although popularity for this genre is low due to the amount of rules and plotting required.

- Fight in the Skies (also known as Dawn Patrol) (Guidon Games) 1971
- Richthofen's War (Avalon Hill) 1972
- Flying Circus (SPI) 1972
- Foxbat & Phantom – Tactical Aerial combat in the 1970s (SPI) 1973
- Spitfire (SPI) 1973
- Air Force (Battleline) 1976
- Dauntless (Battleline) 1977
- Air War (SPI) 1977
- Sopwith (Gametime) 1978
- Air Superiority (GDW) 1987
- Air Strike (GDW) 1987
- The Speed of Heat (Clash of Arms) 1992
- Over the Reich (Clash of Arms) 1993
- Achtung Spitfire! (Clash of Arms) 1995
- Spitfire! (WWW Games) 1996
- Whistling Death (Clash of Arms) 2005

== Fusion ==
An additional category of tactical wargames would be direct translation of board wargames for play on the computer, but with manual input by players. The Vassal game engine designed by Rodney Kinney, as well as Aide-de-Camp, Cyberboard, ZunTzu, and Battlegrounds Gaming Engine are five examples of this. Using Java or similar technology, graphical versions of boards and counters can be manipulated in cyberspace as if a manual version of the game was being played. Dice rolling, chit drawing, and other game functions are all recreated in these "virtual tabletop" systems, which can be played solo, by email, or live multi-player over the Internet, including the option of spectators. A large proportion of published board games have been converted for play in this manner, extending the lives of old boardgames (to avoid copyright infringement, it is expected that players of these games provide their own rulebooks and other physical components only obtainable by purchasing the games.)

Some companies are now releasing games meant solely for play via this medium, such as Dan Verssen's Special Forces, a traditional counter and hex-map board game played strictly in the medium of Vassal. Furthermore, some long-out-of-print games have been republished exclusively as digital games for use in such software.

== Notes ==
1. Information in this section condensed from the article "20 Years Later and 10 Years After Squad Leader" by Rodger B. MacGowan, Fire and Movement Magazine, Issue 53, May/June 1987
2. Lorrin Bird, writing in Special Issue #2 of Campaign Magazine
3. Nick Stasnopolis, Fire & Movement, May/June 1991 issue.
4. Don Greenwood, The General Magazine, May/June 1983 issue.
5. Raymond J. Tapio, Fire & Movement Summer 2004 issue.
6. Don Greenwood, John Hill, and Hal Hock, "Game Design: Art or Science", The General Magazine, Volume 14, Number 5, January–February 1978.
