= PanzerBlitz =

World War II board wargame published in 1970

- Box cover
- Designers: Jim Dunnigan
- Publishers: Avalon Hill
- Players: 2
- Setup time: 15 minutes
- Playing time: 45–180 minutes
- Chance: Medium
- Age range: 10 and up
- Skills: Strategic thought

PanzerBlitz is a tactical-scale board wargame published by Avalon Hill in 1970 that simulates armored combat set on the Eastern Front of World War II. The game, which was the most popular board wargame of the 1970s, is notable for being the first true board-based tactical-level, commercially available conflict simulation wargame. It also pioneered several concepts that would become industry standards.

== Description ==
PanzerBlitz simulates clashes between Soviet and German forces at the level of company-sized infantry for Russian units, and platoon-sized infantry for German units, as well as individual mechanized or motorized vehicles. This scale of simulation was new to wargaming, since previous wargames had focused on larger units such as brigades, regiments, and divisions.

Much of the strategy in PanzerBlitz derives from the rule allowing units to shoot or move, but not both, in a single turn. Additionally, the difficulty of outright destruction of units encourages players to use combined arms rather than a simple concentration of one unit type to defeat the opponent.

The game includes technical information on the weight, speed, gun size, and crew complement of every major tank used on the Russian front. Additionally the battles - which were tactical fights - featured the detailed organizations of fairly small units, all the way from mortar teams to the trucks and wagons needed to give the units strategic flexibility. Much of this information had never been published before, outside of Army field manuals and partially classified intelligence reports.

It also pioneered concepts such as isomorphic mapboards and open-ended design, in which multiple unit counters are provided from which players can fashion their own free-form combat situations rather than simply replaying the published scenarios.

== Gameplay ==
One of many situation cards that tell players how to arrange board and which game pieces to use

=== Scale ===
The game board hexes represent 250 meters, a turn is 6 minutes, the playing pieces represent companies and platoons.

=== Innovative features ===
PanzerBlitz introduced a number of innovations to board wargames:

1. Geomorphic mapboards which can be arranged in various combinations to create different battlefields. This became a hallmark of Avalon Hill tactical games such as Squad Leader. Panzer Leader includes a beach board for invasion scenarios, while The Arab-Israeli Wars includes a canal board to represent the Suez Canal. From the release of PanzerBlitz onward, wargamers started to call any modular game mapboard "geomorphic", adding a new and peculiar meaning to that word.
2. Armor units are represented by vehicle silhouettes rather than standard military symbols, making the game a departure from other operational level games as well as being reminiscent of miniatures games. Combined with bookcase-style packaging, it advanced Avalon Hill's reputation for physical quality.
3. The game is not limited to the 12 scenarios provided with it, but includes instructions for making a Design-Your-Own (DYO) scenario, or "Situation 13". The Designer's Notes shows players how many counters it will take to make up a complete Soviet Tank Corps, though this would require purchasing additional counter sets from Avalon Hill. (Players were advised against such extravagance, however, and urged to keep "counter density" low.) This open-ended approach made PanzerBlitz a highly replayable game system, a feature widely emulated by subsequent games.
4. The wealth of technical detail was unprecedented, as was the detailed description of how this technical data was incorporated into the game. The Designer's Notes state, "A glance at the PanzerBlitz game components gives you the impression that you can pick up a considerable amount of historical data by just studying the game, much less actually playing it ... Unfortunately, you cannot take this data, as modified in the game design, at face value. Instead you must understand some of the decisions that were made about this game data before it was incorporated into the game."

=== Design philosophy ===
In spite of the heavy technical payload, the basic system is quite simple, an expression of Avalon Hill's design philosophy in that playability and design elegance were prized above exactitude. The game mechanics are abstract and aimed at giving a realistic "feel" for armored combat rather than a completely accurate simulation.

=== Simulation issues ===
Although the abstract simplicity of PanzerBlitz attracted a wide following, certain unrealistic aspects were heavily criticized.

- Panzerbush: A tank that ends its movement in a wooded hex is invisible unless an enemy unit is directly adjacent to it, even though the tank may have moved to that position in full view of the enemy, and fired from that position as well. This ability of units to hop from one woods hex to another without being attacked was called "Panzerbush Syndrome", which became a scornful nickname for the game itself. The game provided a cumbersome optional rule to overcome this, but the later versions of the system (Panzer Leader and The Arab-Israeli Wars) provided much better solutions, such as the optional opportunity fire and more realistic rules for spotting and visibility. In addition in these later games systems, a hidden unit that fires on the enemy becomes visible and can be fired upon in return.
- Truck burners: The game provides truck and wagon units to transport infantry and anti-tank guns. However, players used rule "loopholes" to develop other non-historical uses for trucks.:
  - Spotter: A tank parked in woods is invisible unless an enemy unit is adjacent to it. Nothing in the rules prevents a player from driving a truck into the woods and parking it adjacent to the tank, which removes the tank's invisibility, allowing the player owning the truck to fire with other units at the now-visible tank.
  - Roadblock: The rules do not allow for tanks to move into hexes already occupied by enemy units unless the enemy units are located on clear terrain, in which case, the tank can use the "overrrun" rule. However, road hexes with any wood hex-sides are not considered clear terrain and cannot be overrun, allowing a truck to be parked on a road as a roadblock to stop enemy tanks.

== Publication history ==
In 1969, Avalon Hill dominated the wargame market, producing on average, one game per year with well-produced but expensive components. At the new wargame publisher Poultron Press, co-founder Jim Dunnigan and his design team decided to go in the opposite direction, marketing a number of very cheaply made "Test Series" games to see if producing many games a year could also be a viable business model. These test games featured typewritten pages with hand-drawn maps and graphics and thin paper counter sheets, packaged in a plain manila envelope. Tactical Game 3, also titled Test Series Game 3, designed by Dunnigan, was sent to playtesters in 1969. Later the same year, a second printing was included as a free pull-out game in Issue 22 of Poultron Press's house magazine Strategy & Tactics, becoming the first tactical wargame in the history of modern board wargaming.

In 1970, Dunnigan sold the rights to Tactical Game 3 — retaining royalty rights — to Avalon Hill, who republished the game as PanzerBlitz, with professionally designed components and twelve combat scenarios.

From 1970 to 1980, PanzerBlitz was the top-selling board wargame in North America. Avalon Hill followed PanzerBlitz with two companion games: Panzer Leader, which focused on the Western Front; and The Arab-Israeli Wars, which covered the 1956, 1967 and 1973 wars in the Middle East. The numerical values used by counters in The Arab-Israeli Wars conformed to the same scales as the World War II sister games, so that players who wanted to create fanciful scenarios involving modern equipment facing World War II equipment could do so while maintaining the internal consistency and realism of the game system.

Multi-Man Publishing acquired the rights to the game, and released PanzerBlitz: Hill of Death in 2009.

=== Unofficial sequels ===
PanzerBlitz designer Jim Dunnigan created several PanzerBlitz-style games for his own company (which had evolved from Poultron Press to Simulations Publications Inc.): Combat Command, Panzer '44, and MechWar '77. However, as critic Heinz von Sieben noted, "The major disappointment with PanzerBlitz was the sequential nature of the mechanism, and Dunnigan’s mechanism of simultaneous movement for subsequent tactical games such as KampfPanzer and Desert War solved one problem, only to introduce a different problem of playability and bookkeeping."

== Reception ==
In Issue 5 of the UK magazine Games & Puzzles, (September 1972), game designer Don Turnbull commented, "PanzerBlitz is the game which I would isolate as a personal favourite and one which is most suitable for a newcomer to the hobby." Turnbull noted that the game "has variety, flexibility, realism, playability and considerable entertainment value." After a lengthy examination of the game mechanics, Turnbull concluded, "I recommend PanzerBlitz highly to anyone aspiring to become a board wargamer. [...] This game probably represents the best combination of the features of board wargaming." Several issues later, Turnbull added, "At the risk of repeating myself, one of the most flexible and enjoyable games currently available."

In A Player's Guide to Table Games, John Jackson noted the "Panzerbush syndrome", pointing out that "units skulk from woods hex to woods hex, from ravine to protecting slope, without incurring the enemy fire which, in reality, they would have drawn when they exposed themselves on open ground." However, Jackson concluded, "PanzerBlitz is complex; it's got a lot of rules and is definitely not the first wargame a novice should tackle. But it's challenging and a whole lot of fun, and that's what games are all about, isn't it?"

In his 1977 book The Comprehensive Guide to Board Wargaming, Nicholas Palmer called it "Perhaps the most frequently played wargame ever produced." He noted PanzerBlitz was "the first to bring a wealth of tactical detail to the Second World War East Front, and met a delighted reception from the hobby when it came out in 1970." Palmer highlighted some frailties of the aging game design, particularly "somewhat unbalanced scenarios and the 'Panzerbush' syndrome, in which units popping from wood to wood cannot be attacked by non-adjacent units, which is a flaw in realism." He concluded on an upbeat note, saying, "Exciting, high skill level, very complex."

Games magazine included PanzerBlitz in their "Top 100 Games of 1980", saying, "Simulating World War Il combat between small units of Germans and Russians, this is the best-selling wargame ever published. Its popular features include a nifty mapboard that fits together in 12 different configurations, and rules that allow players to invent battle situations beyond the 12 provided."

In the 1980 book The Complete Book of Wargames, game designer Jon Freeman called PanzerBlitz "a watershed design. It was the first to simulate World War II events at the tactical level, the first to treat the differences between armor and infantry as more than a distinction in attack or movement factors, and the first to develop a real sequence of play, with different events occurring at different stages." He called it "an enormously important game — really the first to break out of the 'classic' Avalon Hill mode." In addition to its historical significance in the hobby, Freeman also noted that "It is also a very good game that is fluid in play, exciting, and colorful." He did admit there were problems with the spotting rules that allowed units "to skulk from woods without being fired on — a pattern known as the 'panzerbush syndrome'", as well as with the effectiveness of indirect high explosive artillery. Despite these issues, he gave the game an Overall Evaluation of "Very Good".

By August 1996, a quarter century after its publication, PanzerBlitz had sold 275,000 copies. Computer Gaming World columnist Terry Coleman claimed that these figures made it the second-best-selling board wargame ever, behind Axis & Allies. In his 2000 book Wargames Handbook: How to Play and Design Commercial and Professional Wargames, PanzerBlitz designer Jim Dunnigan stated that the game had sold the "extraordinary sales figure" of 320,000 units over 25 years, making it the most successful board wargame in the history of the hobby.

In a retrospective review in Issue 28 of Simulacrum, Heinz von Sieben commented, "The abstract simplicity of PanzerBlitz combined with its elegant physical presentation and its release at a most opportune moment in the growth of interest in board wargames attracted a wide following. Quite simply, PanzerBlitz was incredibly popular when it first came out, a fact which encouraged the development of other tactical games and ultimately led to the most successful of the tactical systems, Squad Leader and Advanced Squad Leader."

SimCity designer Will Wright cited PanzerBlitz as one of his influences in designing his later works.

== Other reviews and commentary ==
- Casus Belli #12 (Dec 1982)
- Moves #50, p23
- The Playboy Winner's Guide to Board Games
- Panzerfaust #55 and 61
