= Crescendo of Doom =

Cover art by Rodger B. MacGowan

Board 6	Orchard Terrain
Board 7	River Terrain
Scenarios: 21-32

Crescendo of Doom is a supplement published in 1980 by Avalon Hill for use with the World War II board wargame Squad Leader. This expansion concentrates on the early part of the war (1939–1941) in Western and Central Europe.

== Description ==
Crescendo of Doom (COD) is an expansion (or "gamette", as described by the publisher) for Squad Leader that includes counters and rules for French and British infantry, vehicles and ordnance, with most tanks and guns being palpably less powerful than the late-war equipment in other gamettes. Because this focuses on the early years of the war before American involvement, none of the US built tanks and equipment used by the British from 1941 are included.

The gamette includes more detailed infantry rules, including such things as cowering and pinning, while introducing Scouts and morale disadvantages for early war infantry facing off against tanks. The gamette also includes Finnish infantry (who have the rare ability to rally themselves without the presence of a leader) and the "Allied Minors" including Belgium, Norway, Poland and the Netherlands.

Two new map boards are provided. (In Squad Leader terms, these modular maps, which can be used in conjunction with Squad Leader and Cross of Iron, are numbered Boards 6 and 7.) Many new terrain types are introduced on the two new mapboards, including marsh, river (with rules for river crossings), large bridges, and orchards.

Twelve new scenarios are included with this expansion, Scenarios 21–32.

21. Battle for the Warta Line (Poland)
22. The Borders are Burning (Russo-Finnish War)
23. Silent Death (Russo-Finnish War)
24. Action at Balberkamp (Norway)
26. Assault on a Queen (Hypothetical - Belgium)
27. The Dinant Bridgehead (France) (the German 7th Panzer Division crosses the Meuse, with a counter representing Erwin Rommel taking personal command.)
28. Counterstroke at Stonne (France)
29. In Rommel's Wake (France)
30. Ad Hoc at Beaurains (France)
31. Chateau de Quesnoy (France)
32. Rehearsal for Crete (Greece)

Copies of both Squad Leader and Cross of Iron are needed in order to play these scenarios.

== Publication history ==
Avalon Hill debuted Squad Leader in 1977, and it quickly became very popular, selling more than 100,000 copies. This was followed by the publication of two "gamettes" or expansions, Cross of Iron in 1979 and Crescendo of Doom in 1980. The latter was designed by Don Greenwood and featured cover art by Rodger B. MacGowan.

== Reception ==
In Issue 49 of the British wargaming magazine Perfidious Albion, Geoffrey Barnard noted several issues with the American publisher's use (or misuse) of British units, pointing out in one instance that one British regiment should have had nine Bren guns but in fact were only supplied with two. But about the game itself, Barnard concluded, "Squad Leader/Cross of Iron/Crescendo of Doom is not so much a game, but more a way of life ... the game now contains more detail, rules and counter-types than most gamers will be able to use in a lifetime."

In his 1980 book The Best of Board Wargaming, Nick Palmer commented, "Play can be very bloodthirsty, and is nearly always exciting." Palmer gave this game an Excitement rating of 90%. In a sidebar, Geoff Barnard agreed, writing, "Squad Leader and its expansions is very much a system with components rather than a mere game, and while the [overall] package is so detailed as to be almost indigestible, the player is free to use what detail he wants as he see fit." In a second sidebar, Graham Buckell cautioned "the rules are disorganized and though there is an index it can be difficult to find minor points."

In the Italian magazine Pergioco, Giovanni Ingellis noted, "Crescendo of Doom continues to broaden the horizons of the game by providing French, English and Finnish tanks and units." But Ingellis warned beginning players against advancing through the scenarios too quickly, saying, "It is a dish for gourmets, even if they are beginners; overdoing it with spices would distort its flavour ... Taken in the right doses ... this could instead become your favorite war game."

In Issue 51 of Moves, John Alsen did an in-depth review of the new rules, terrain, counters and each of the 11 scenarios, then concluded, "Crescendo of Doom is a worthy successor to Cross of Iron. There are no major problems with the rules ... This is a package with the potential to provide many hours of enjoyment to those interested in the period."

In Campaign Special Issue #2, Lorrin Bird commented, "While the original Squad Leader game was a work of art with regard to its fine balance of playability and detail...the gamettes are coming to represent the 'masterpieces' of wargamedom due to the unbelievable trivia that is included." Bird concluded, "The end result of the amazing efforts being made to make the SL system as complete as possible is that one is presented with tanks which act pretty much like they did in real life."

== Awards ==
- At the 1981 Origins Awards, Crescendo of Doom won the Charles S. Roberts Award for Best 20th Century Boardgame of 1980.
