= Squad Leader =

1977 tactical board wargame

- Publishers: Avalon Hill
- Publication: 1977
- Genres: Board wargame
- Skills: Strategy

Squad Leader is a tactical level board wargame originally published by Avalon Hill in 1977. It was designed by John Hill and simulates infantry combat in Europe during World War II. One of the most complex board wargames of its time, Squad Leader is the natural extension of the trend towards greater realism (and hence complexity) initiated by several earlier games, including Avalon Hill's own PanzerBlitz and Panzer Leader. Those two earlier games were slightly larger in scope, with counters representing platoons and map hexes measuring 250 metres across, compared to Squad Leader's 40 meter hexes and squad sized units.

Full color flyer from 1977

The original Squad Leader was produced in time to debut at Origins 1977. (The original print run of 2,500 copies had purple boxes which have become collector's items.) Avalon Hill sold well in excess of 100,000 games of Squad Leader, making it one of the most successful war games ever made. Combined with the sales of Advanced Squad Leader, its sales totaled over 1 million copies by 1997.

== Gameplay ==
Pieces in Squad Leader represent regular squads (rated for firepower, range and morale), weapon and vehicle crews, elite squads (with high firepower and morale but shorter range - used to represent paratroops or combat engineers armed with sub-machine guns), individual leaders, support weapons, and vehicles.

The original game contains counters representing the German, Russian and American armies. Russian troops are portrayed as poorly armed (and with poor quality radios, making it very difficult for them to summon artillery support) and with relatively fewer leaders, but with the capacity to become "berserk" in combat (a capacity shared in later expansions by SS troops). US troops are shown as having unusually high firepower (representing larger squads, using the Browning Automatic Rifle - unlike other nationalities who have separate counters for light machine guns), but with slightly lower base morale than German or Soviet troops, representing the supposed greater tendency of more individualistic Americans to break from their orders or the group under fire - however, American troops are easier to rally under fire, as they were exempt from the usual penalty ("desperation morale") paid by broken squads in these circumstances. British troops, when eventually added to the game system, are shown as largely similar to the Germans, albeit with somewhat inferior equipment.

The mapboards are divided into hexagonal grids with each hex said to represent 40 metres of terrain, the result of the designer being asked what the ground scale was, rolling a die and it coming up 'four'. In reality, European village streets are not 40 meters across, for example. Time was said to be two minutes per turn, though the developer admits that this is also inexact and that each game turn should be considered a "module of time, such that the (game's) events can occur and interact with one another."

The semi-simultaneous system of play developed in the mid-1970s can be seen in Squad Leader's sequence of play. Each turn consists of two player turns, each of which have eight "phases":

- Rally phase (in which "broken" units attempt to rally and malfunctioning weapons are repaired)
- Prep fire phase (in which the player whose turn it is may fire on enemy units; any units that prep fire cannot move or fire again for the rest of the player's turn)
- Movement phase (in which the player may move their units on the board)
- Defensive fire phase (in which the other player may fire on units that just moved)
- Advancing fire phase (in which any units that moved may fire, at reduced strength)
- Rout phase (in which any "broken" units must flee for cover)
- Advance phase (in which the player whose turn it is may move every unit one hex), and the close combat phase (in which any units from opposite sides that start that phase in the same hex engage in close combat)

The name of the game is actually a misnomer, as in most ways the player assumes the role of a company commander (i.e. gives orders to platoons and squads). The squad leaders in Squad Leader are actually "factored in" to the squad counters, and only exceptional leaders - officers and NCOs - are portrayed separately, by their own counters. Leaders can exert a favorable influence on the firing of support weapons, or the morale rolls of squads with whom they are stacked, although if a leader fails a morale check the squads stacked with him must check for morale a second time. Most scenarios give each player, generally speaking, enough simulated men to make up a company, though order of battle is not precise and most scenarios only give a flavor of what the real life battles were like rather than a direct simulation.

One aspect of the game that adds greatly to its popularity are the generic geomorphic mapboards, each of which can be aligned to any edge of the same length to any other mapboard (except river boards). This allows for an almost unlimited number of combinations to create any terrain situation, including player designed scenarios. Printed overlays, first introduced in the gamette GI: Anvil of Victory, enable additional terrain types to be added to mapboards.

Line of sight (LOS) is determined by sighting between the dots in the center of each hex. String can be used to check LOS, and the printed terrain depictions on the photo-realistic maps are used to determine blockages (hexes are not considered automatically filled by terrain therein). These LOS rules were innovative for board games when introduced in the 1970s.

The original game contains mapboards mounted on heavy durable cardboard, which was (and remains) expensive but a design feature long associated with Avalon Hill games. Each mapboard measures 10 columns of hexes high by 32 hexes wide, numbered from hex A1 in the top left corner to hex GG10 in the lower right.

Board 1	Urban terrain
Board 2	Hill terrain
Board 3	Village terrain
Board 4	Rural terrain
Scenarios: 1-12

The design philosophy that John Hill brought to Squad Leader was "design for effect". He hypothesized that no matter what kind of fire might be brought on a squad of infantry, be it a flame weapon, a grenade, a machine gun, or an artillery shell, there could only be three outcomes; the squad would be eliminated by killing or wounding the men in it; the squad would be "discomfited" to some degree (i.e. they must check for morale - if they fail they run for cover until rallied by a leader, and if they fail a second morale roll while "broken" the counter is removed as the men are assumed to have run away); or there would be no effect. Using this principle, he was able to employ a single table to create combat results of the various weapons systems used in the game. A similar principle is employed in dealing with support weapons - rolling a certain number might cause a weapon (e.g. a machine gun) to be put out of action, after which a player must roll again each turn until the weapon is either restored to use or lost altogether; there is no need to determine whether the weapon was broken, jammed, or was simply reloading with fresh ammunition.

Squad Leader is a game system by design rather than just one game. The game itself comes with 12 different scenarios, each one introducing more complicated rules in a system called "programmed instruction". Each scenario card includes historical information, victory conditions and play balancers for each side. However, Squad Leader also has a "design your own" system where forces are selected by drawing playing cards from a standard 52 card deck and comparing the result to a table where different forces were described. There is also a point purchase system for "buying" opposing forces. New scenarios were published in Avalon Hill's gaming magazine, The General, as well as additional scenario packs (the rogue scenarios, for example, see below). Third parties also produced scores of SL scenarios.

== Strengths ==
Squad Leader attempted to simulate many types of battlefield phenomena not addressed before in a tactical board game, and enjoyed a cosmetic treatment unmatched then and afterwards. Some of these strengths include:

- The effects of leadership on morale is elegantly handled, with extraordinary leaders (only) having direct effects on the ability of men to move, shoot, and resist enemy attack.
- The rigid turn sequences of earlier war games was dispensed with in favor of the innovative eight-phase turns described above. Units can interact with enemy units during the other player's turn.
- The game, as explained by John Hill's designer's notes, encourages players to learn and adopt basic infantry tactics - defenders are encouraged to site machine guns to dominate fields of fire, while attackers are encouraged to have some men give covering fire while others moved.
- Some support weapons can fire multiple times in a phase, and machine guns have the ability ("penetration") to inflict damage through a line of several adjacent hexes - two hexes for a light machine gun, and six or even eight for a heavy machine gun.
- The system is flexible and open-ended; the geomorphic boards can represent reasonably well many types of terrain, and the use of "scenario special rules" expand these possibilities even further. Victory conditions are also flexible and imaginative, not being confined to mere shootouts between opposing forces, scenarios could simulate all manners of military missions (especially in the follow-up modules), such as successfully escorting convoys, parachute and glider assaults, a deliberate assault on prepared positions, an ambush, a meeting engagement, a hasty attack/defence scenario, a passage of obstacles, a withdrawal under fire, and even such things as hostage situations. Missions that real life company commanders would have faced and performed.
- The quality of the physical components has rarely been equalled by other games; counters are functional, evocative, well designed (free of clutter), and attractive. Especially popular are the red "berserk" counters which add much flavor to the game; Cross of Iron adds striking white-on-black counters to represent the Waffen SS. The mounted mapboards (both in Squad Leader and its offspring) are a hallmark of Avalon Hill, and continued right through to the introduction of the ASL Starter Kits by Multi-Man Publishing in 2004 (which featured mapboards printed on inexpensive cardboard stock). The mapboards are also photo-realistic, with an attractive top down view that is also functional, with line of sight (LOS) drawn from hex center to hex center and blocked only by terrain depictions (often with accompanying shadows) on the artwork itself, not the entire hex as in other games.

== Weaknesses ==
Some of the weaknesses that keep Squad Leader from being a true simulation of the decisions that a World War II commander would make are well known and attempts have been made to address them; others were simply ignored for the sake of "playability". Some of these include the following:

- Despite some rules for "concealment" and "hidden initial placement", most of the game is played where each player can always see what forces the enemy has and precisely where they are placed, even if out of LOS of their own units. There is little "fog of war." Attempts to address this - some have suggested using multiple copies of the game and a third party to act as "umpire" - are cumbersome and in some cases book-keeping intensive.
- Play is not simultaneous but done in predictable turn sequence, one player getting a turn, and then the other. An attempt to address this was the use of "track" counters introduced in the first section of the rulebook, and the optional rule of "semi-simultaneous movement and defensive fire" which later became standardized in Advanced Squad Leader.
- There are no partial casualties to either men or vehicles. Squads are considered to be at full strength until destroyed, and vehicles suffer no damage aside from weapons malfunctions or immobilizations; partial penetrations, panicked crews, and other battlefield phenomena are not directly depicted in Squad Leader. (However, the concept of the "half squad" was introduced in Crescendo of Doom, though not as a battlefield result, and further developed with the introduction of special half squad counters in GI: Anvil of Victory).

Nick Stasnopolis, writing in Fire & Movement magazine (Number 73, May/June 1991) made the following assessment:

Few tactical games during this period (mid 1970s) are comparable to Squad Leader,...which is quite popular and is of a similar scale (to Search & Destroy and Firefight), but has a needlessly complex combat system, leadership rules that would be more appropriate for 18th century combat and ridiculously simplistic casualty rules. It also displays the typical American fascination with gadgets while ignoring war's social, political, and logistical aspects. The war-game industry has basically ignored the more accurate portrayal of company level combat in (Search & Destroy) for the more glamorous version portrayed in Squad Leader.

== Expansion ==
Three expansions (called gamettes by the publisher) were produced, Cross of Iron (COI), Crescendo of Doom (COD) and GI: Anvil of Victory (GI).

=== Cross of Iron ===
COI expands the German and Soviet orders of battle, including also Axis Minor infantry types.

=== Crescendo of Doom ===
COD provides blanket coverage to the Western Front of 1939–1941.

=== GI: Anvil of Victory ===
The final gamette (1983)

Board 8	River Terrain
Board 12	Village Terrain
Board 13	Rural Terrain
Board 14	Rural/Airfield Terrain
Board 15	Hill Terrain
Scenarios: 33-47
Terrain Overlays: "A-O"

This gamette provides expanded coverage to American forces, as well as US-manufactured equipment as used by the British in the last half of the war, as well as certain British equipment like the PIAT that was not included in COD. The rulebook for Crescendo of Doom suggested that this game would not be available before February 1981; Squad Leader fans still recall awaiting this next game, which was finally released in 1983.

The "gamette" was actually bigger than Squad Leader itself, with 856 more counters and five more mapboards, as well as three more scenarios than the original SL. As well, two sheets of terrain overlays were included in the box. The modelling of infantry was again increased in level of detail, with squads now able to "break to green", or be replaced by lower quality units when morale checks didn't measure up to their Experience Level Rating. Many players were upset that the ELR restrictions were almost always applied to American forces and not to other nationalities as a rule. (ASL would remedy this by applying the restriction to all forces of all nationalities). Point values for US forces were also omitted from the game, restricting DYO (Design Your Own) scenarios to non-American forces. Other restrictions on US troops not present in the earlier SL game also angered some players (the original SL had a rule whereby American troops were not subject to "Desperation Morale" penalties, for example, while GI dispensed with this.) And the Italian forces promised as early as autumn 1979 did not materialize (indeed, would not, until the Hollow Legions module for Advanced Squad Leader was released in 1989.)

Nonetheless, the game system did go forward in many ways; according to James Collier in his history of Squad Leader printed in Issue 34 of The Grenadier:

Like (Crescendo of Doom) before it, GI brought mostly rules changes, including some rather drastic revisions of some of the most fundamental system mechanics. For example, in COD a provision was made to allow whole squads to be deployed into half-squads, but without providing special half-squad counters...GI brought a profusion of half-squad counters and also provided a mechanism where a squad could take half-squad casualties...

Some of these changes required a reissue of many of the original infantry counters with new parameters (and a distinctly less dynamic counter art). Many AFVs had to be retrofitted with new parameters, but without counters (the player had to remember which changes applied to which vehicle). Many of the parameters chosen for US components proved to be controversial.

The outcome was that GI was a very disorganized game, difficult to play "correctly". Trying to synthesize all the many rules into a coherent whole was virtually impossible, a fact tacitly conceded by (Avalon Hill) in that the GI (rulebook) index was not cumulative and did not cross-reference with the previous rules manuals.

The end result was that German AFV counters did not represent some of the new changes, such as inferior turret armor, and German squad counters did not have accurate representations for such things as smoke making capability or other abilities introduced in GI. As far as the game system had come, it was clear that much of the foundation on which it was resting had to be redone and/or reorganized. In fact, GI: Anvil of Victory had already reached a point where most of the counters from the original Squad Leader game had been made obsolete, as German, British, French and American infantry counters were redone (with controversial "static" artwork depicting soldiers at rest rather than in action poses) with new information for smoke-making capability, and special weapons and morale characteristics (these characteristics would carry over to Advanced Squad Leader.)

== Additional products ==
Additional products by John Hill include Across A Deadly Field and Johnny Reb.

Many third-party products were produced for Squad Leader, and it is probable that privately made scenarios number in the hundreds if not thousands. Avalon Hill also released "official" additions to the Squad Leader system.

=== Additional Official Scenarios ===
Three sets of "official" scenarios were released by Avalon Hill directly. Series 100 was designed for Cross of Iron and released Series in 1979, consisting of ten new scenarios designed by Courtney Allen (SL playtester and designer of Storm Over Arnhem). Series 200 (scenarios 201-210) was designed for Crescendo of Doom, and Series 300 for GI: Anvil of Victory (scenarios 301-310).

- Scenarios: 101-110 (Series 100)
- Scenarios: 201-210 (Series 200)
- Scenarios: 301-310 (Series 300)

A rare case of third-party scenarios being done by license as an "official" product was the scenario pack released by World Wide Wargamers (W.W.W.) in 1982, offered by The Wargamer Magazine, containing Scenarios 81-90 for Crescendo of Doom and released in 1982. The artwork published by WWW is poorly done on this offering, which was also printed on flimsy paper, in booklet style, rather than the separate card stock scenarios normally associated with Avalon Hill SL products. A second set was released for G.I.: Anvil of Victory.

- Scenarios: 81-90
- Scenarios: 91-100

=== Rogue Scenarios ===
Board 9	Mountain Terrain
Board 10	Forest/Village Terrain
Board 11	Low Hill Terrain
Scenarios: R211-R220

The Rogue Scenarios were available only by direct mail-order to Avalon Hill, and were so called because they required ownership of three non-standard boards (also available at that time only via mail-order). The artwork on these boards initially was of low quality. For example, the low hill mass on Board 11 in the earlier version was actually rendered in bright red, indicating it could be simulating either a Level One height, or possibly some other type of terrain such as ground level mud, wheatfield, etc. However, the boards later were redone for ASL products to the high standards previously established. Most of these scenarios require only single copies of the three new boards along with the Squad Leader series boards (specifically boards 1-8), but Scenario R220 requires access to two copies each of boards 4 and 6-10.

=== ASL Annual ===
Scenarios: A1-A6

Aside from regular features in the house organ of Avalon Hill, The General, AH also produced a series of magazines focused on Advanced Squad Leader called ASL Annual beginning in 1989; these contained some original SL content also. When Multiman Publishing (MMP) took over publication of ASL components, they started to produce ASL Journal on an irregular basis. Both magazines were in the same format as The General, with no outside advertising, and full of articles, variants, and scenarios for all incarnations of ASL. SL-themed content seems to have disappeared from the MMP-produced ASL Journal. Other third party offerings have also declined in the years since the release of ASL.

== Advanced Squad Leader and VASL ==
By 1983 and the release of GI, there were four separate rulebooks with sometimes contradictory or poorly integrated rules. For example, US forces with lower morale were penalized by the fact that morale ratings were used to determine at random the ability to push ordnance through snow or mud. Logically, morale should not have an effect on such an effort.

James Collier, in a piece entitled "Glass Anvil: A Dissenting View of GI: Anvil of Victory", presented in Volume 20, Number 1 of The General, described the situation:

By now it should be recognized that the Squad Leader series is virtually unique among WWII board games by being a game in evolution. The succeeding gamettes have not been mere additions to the original, but instead have introduced substantial revisions to the original parameters. This is even more true with GI where the bulk of both components and rules represent revisions rather than new material. There are, for example, only 300 more counters than provided with CRESCENDO OF DOOM, and well over half the GI counters represent replacements for counters previously introduced (only a handful of the original SL counters are still usuable (sic) in their printed form)...

Though one must pay the price of forfeiting obsolete materials above and beyond the purchase price, the loss can be accepted as the cost of progress. There are few who would quibble with the appropriateness of the added dimensions of the revised vehicle and ordnance counters presented in CROSS OF IRON. That process is, of course, carried forward in COD and GI to include the relevant nationalities. Now GI introduces a similar order of revision for the infantry counters in addition to a number of new maneuvers and capabilities. As this evolution continues, one is eventually compelled to ask where it is going and why?

It was clear that the system had grown in ways never dreamed of in 1977; large amounts of "nutmail" arriving at Avalon Hill convinced the developers of the need to streamline the rules. Originally this was anticipated as being a simple compilation of the rules in existence, possibly redoing the "To Hit/To Kill" system used to simulate armour protection and penetration in tank combat. In the March–April 1983 issue of Fire & Movement, developer Don Greenwood stated that he saw the next project as being a hardcover or loose-leaf version of the rules, with the "entire game system ... rewritten and revised where necessary" to make one combined "advanced" version. Greenwood also, in one of the replies to Collier in the Volume 20, Number 1 issue of The General, described this project as "...a rewritten, succinct and complete compilation of the entire game system in one rulebook."

Greenwood envisioned the new rulebook as not being available before 1985, and thought it would be followed by a gamette featuring the fighting in North Africa (and allowing a redo of the German armour counters while also introducing the Italians), followed by a Russian Front gamette redoing the Russians, and a final gamette featuring the Far East, with Chinese and Japanese troops. After that, it was expected to release historical offerings with maps modelled after actual locations. In Volume 20, Number 1 of The General, he also anticipated "the Advanced SQUAD LEADER Rulebook will be a major publishing event greater than any of the previous gamette releases."

Greenwood's prediction was correct as far as time frame; in 1985 the Advanced Squad Leader system debuted. Greenwood had stated the following in the Introduction to the GI: Anvil of Victory rulebook:

During the past two years in which G.I. has been under design, I have been simultaneously making copious notes for the project which must ultimately follow it: THE ADVANCED SQUAD LEADER RULEBOOK. Don't let the title fool you. It will not be an even more complex version of what you already have, bound together between two covers. Rather it will improve the final game system by simplifying, cutting, and rewriting. The end result will be both a more comprehensive and a much shorter set of rules.

However, the Advanced Squad Leader Rulebook became much more than just a simple rewrite of the rules, it in fact became a complete replacement of the games of the original SL series. Some fans were much taken aback by the need to replace the four modules they had spent so much money on; only the mapboards of the earlier series would be compatible (indeed, necessary) to play the new games. Squad Leader alone has 520 1/2 in counters and 192 5/8 in counters rendered obsolete by the new system (in fact, many had already been made obsolete by the time GI was introduced). GI: Anvil of Victory has 1568 counters all of which are rendered useless by anyone wishing to continue on with the Advanced version. Greenwood's predictions on future gamettes were also inaccurate given the need to redo every counter in the system from scratch; twelve "core" modules would be needed to introduce the wide range of nationalities. The historical gamettes (called "modules" now) did evolve as predicted.

The new game is also a minimum purchase of two components, the Advanced Squad Leader Rulebook, and an initial module, either Beyond Valor, which contains a brand new counter mix for the German, Russian and Finnish armies, as well as all necessary system counters, or else Paratrooper, which contains a limited counter mix for system markers, US paratrooper units and their German opponents in Normandy. Either initial module also requires ownership of boards from SL in order to play the included scenarios. Future modules also make use of mapboards previously released only with SL.

The new game does not feature Programmed Instruction, requiring a thorough reading of at least four chapters of the ASL Rulebook in order to play a game with ordnance and/or vehicles in it. Even the most basic ASL components are no longer introductory in nature, though Paratrooper, masquerades as such. (This would be redressed in 2005 by the introduction of ASL Starter Kits). Avalon Hill actually suggested that anyone wishing to play ASL also purchase the original Squad Leader and gain experience with that system first, and kept the original SL and three gamettes in print. The necessity of owning boards from these modules in order to play printed scenarios in the core modules of ASL may also have been a factor in this decision. So while ASL was intended to replace SL, there was a certain ambiguity for many years about the status of SL's replacement; the original game was still necessary as a stepping stone to learning ASL, and a source for needed mapboards.

Virtual Squad Leader

However, the original Squad Leader went out of print after Hasbro purchased Avalon Hill. Nonetheless, there are still many aficionadoes of the original SL system, who prefer the simplicity of the earlier design to its much more complicated offspring. There are also projects similar to Virtual Advanced Squad Leader (VASL) for the original game system, which allow for live online play of Squad Leader in a virtual environment, like Virtual Squad Leader (VSQL) for the VASAL game engine. At least one programmer is working on an Artificial Intelligence (or AI) for the virtual version of SL. As home publishing software and hardware get more sophisticated, it is possible to produce high quality "unofficial" game components from scenario cards to custom sized mapboard to personalized leader counters.

== Reception ==
In Issue 21 of the British wargaming magazine Perfidious Albion, Charles Vasey and Geoffrey Barnard discussed the game. Barnard commented, "I am greatly impressed with everything about this game, comparing it to every other tactical game on the market it comes out on top in every possible category." Vasey replied, "It is a good game, it bears the John Hill stamp of realism through simplicity and has passing resemblance to Hue." Barnard concluded, "A massive recommendation to all tactical game fans, this game contains almost everything you might wish for. If any game could overtake PanzerBlitz in popularity, this could be it." Vasey concluded, " If this game is not a success, I'll eat my hat. It is probably as accurate as Tobruk but about three million times more fun."

In the 1980 book The Complete Book of Wargames, game designer Jon Freeman noted that "The game is exciting, colorful, and almost endless in its variations and scenario possibilities. While the play sequence (complicated as it is) is geared more to fun than to an accurate representation of a squad-level firefight, the game does give the players a remarkable feel for close-tactical combat." Freeman gave this game an Overall Evaluation of "Very Good", concluding, "Although clearly intended only for advanced players, Squad Leader is not unplayably long and does reward the time spent learning the rules. It seems to be that rare bird: an instant success with staying power."

R. B. McArthur for Washingtonian in 1980 said that "It is incredible that anyone actually plays these monsters, but the use of programmed rules lets the player start Squad Leader, for instance, by reading seven pages and then working his way up. Certainly such games could exist only in a modern urban setting. No one could play them if they had to get any plowing done."

Squad Leader was chosen for inclusion in the 2007 book Hobby Games: The 100 Best. Game designer Ray Winninger explained: "Hill's design recreates World War II combat in the same way that a great caricaturist recreates a face — by exaggerating the important bits and abstracting everything else. Many of the game's individual concepts are decidedly 'unrealistic.' Players possess almost omniscient knowledge of the battlefield, cardboard soldiers are all too eager to fight to the last man, key weapon systems and environmental effects are vastly oversimplified. Yet, added together, these details produce an end result that somehow feels real. By exaggerating, oversimplifying, and abstracting, Hill provides a decent primer on World War II infantry tactics — the importance of covering fire and maneuver, the use of machine guns to prevent movement across open spaces, the key differences between German and Russian combatants, and so forth."

=== Awards ===
- At the 1978 Origins Awards, Squad Leader won the Charles S. Roberts Award for Best Tactical/Operational Game of 1977.
- At the 1979 Origins Awards, Cross of Iron won the Charles S. Roberts Award for Best Physical Systems & Graphics of 1978.
- At the 1981 Origins Awards, Crescendo of Doom won the Charles S. Roberts Award for Best 20th Century Boardgame of 1980.
- Squad Leader was inducted into the Origins Hall of Fame in 2003.

== Other reviews and commentary ==
- Fire & Movement #33
- Moves #48
- Moves #50
- Games & Puzzles #73
- The Playboy Winner's Guide to Board Games
- Perfidious Albion #24 (January 1978) p. 7-10
