= Magic Realm =

Board game

- Magic Realm game components (1st edition)
- Designers: Richard Hamblen
- Publishers: Avalon Hill
- Publication: 1979
- Players: 1–16
- Chance: Low
- Age range: 12 and up

Magic Realm is a fantasy adventure board game designed by Richard Hamblen and published by Avalon Hill in 1979. Magic Realm is more complex than many wargames and is somewhat similar to a role-playing game. It can be played solitaire or with up to 16 players and game time can last 4 hours or more. The game board is a type of geomorphic mapboard constructed of large double-sided hexagon tiles, ensuring a wide variety of playing surfaces.

A second edition of the rules, changing the rulebook format and some of the gameplay, was published in 1986 and included in those games sold after that date. Magic Realm has been out of print since 1998, when Avalon Hill went out of business. Due to its uniqueness and complexity, the game has achieved cult status with some gamers. Some of these have written an unofficial 'Third Edition' of the rules that clarifies many of the game's ambiguities. Many websites exist today to promote the game.

== Gameplay ==
In the game, a player takes the role of one (or more) of sixteen different characters. Each character has different abilities, strengths, weaknesses, and different allies and foes among the native groups and visitors that can appear on the board. Once characters have been chosen, each player chooses individual victory conditions based on 5 categories: Great Treasures, Spells, Fame, Notoriety and Gold. The player allocates between 2-5 points (depending on the level he plays at) to the categories in any way they wish. The allocation usually corresponds to the type of character played. The player will then attempt to obtain these goals through fighting with monsters, trading and various quests and searches for treasure and items, and encounters with other characters and the various beings in the Realm. The player who first achieves their personal victory conditions wins the game.

Example: the Swordsman might choose 2 points in Great Treasures, 1 in Fame and 2 in Gold, meaning that to win he needs to have 2 great treasures, 10 fame, and 60 gold pieces. As the Swordsman has no magical ability they would not pursue spells. Another character, such as the Wizard, might choose differently, perhaps decreasing the need for gold and great treasures to obtain spells for casting. Winning the game is quite challenging, and the chances of your character dying at the hands of monsters, hostile natives, or another perfidious character are significant.

The game has many unique features that were groundbreaking for its time that can make repeat play very enjoyable: notably the random distribution of treasure sites, monsters, treasures, and spell cards and the novel board which is built collectively by the players from hexagonal tiles that can be put together in literally millions of ways following a few simple rules to ensure the connectivity of the paths. The ability of characters with magical skills to enchant hex tiles during play, causing the tiles to flip over and changing the paths and adding magic colors to the tile, is another unique and intriguing feature.

The setup preparation time is relatively long. Preparing the treasure setup card can take 30 minutes or longer. The building of the game board can also take a considerable amount of time, particularly for inexperienced players. In addition, some players find the combat system difficult to learn. To aid in this effort, and to bend the learning curve, the game system allows to play truncated versions known as encounters. In the Second Edition rules there are 4 encounters - as opposed to 7 in the First Edition -, each one introducing a new game concept. This allows the players to master one part of the rules before learning the next section.

== Realm Speak ==
Robin Warren has written a java application called Realm Speak that simulates both solo and multiplayer Magic Realm on a computer for either offline, LAN or internet play. The application decreases setup time to zero and also permits the use of various expansions, alternate counter art and alternate characters. In addition, the app enforces all of the complex written rules for Magic Realm version 2, eliminating the chances for error, and greatly increasing the challenge for players. The app runs on Mac and PC computers, for Windows, macOS/OS X and Linux operating systems.

== Reception ==
In the December 1979 issue of the British wargaming magazine Perfidious Albion, Nicholas Barker liked the physical components, calling them "first rate", and liked the overall tone of the game, saying it was "probably the best boardgame/wargame treatment of a fantasy subject available." However, Barker was not impressed with the graduated learning environment, pointing out that it might be necessary for a complex tactical wargame like Squad Leader, it made all of the preliminary steps for this game "utterly trivial ... A mass of ideas have been crammed into a box and although they hang together it makes Magic Realm (a) damned hard to learn, and (b) difficult to discover all the goodies in three hours playing." Despite this, Barker concluded on a relatively positive note, saying, "the basic game is clever and works well, the game is unlikely to stale with repeated play, there is a good balance between luck and skill."

In 1980, Eric Goldberg reviewed Magic Realm in Ares Magazine #1, rating it a 4 out of 9. Goldberg commented that "As the rules become more sophisticated (and this is a complex game when all the rules are used), the murky rules require as much interpretation as a Supreme Court decision. There could have been a great game in Magic Realm, but it was aborted early in the life-cycle of this game."

Eric Goldberg again reviewed Magic Realm in Ares Magazine #2 and commented that "For all its faults, Magic Realm contains a wealth of excellent ideas. If the game had been realistically planned and well executed, it would have been one of the best fantasy board games ever produced. Unfortunately, the lofty goals set for the game caused it to fall flat on its face. The design remains like the legendary Don Quixote: forever tilting at windmills."

Also in 1980, Denis Loubet reviewed Magic Realm in The Space Gamer No. 28. Loubet commented that "If you can wade through the rules, Magic Realm is worth buying. The components alone justify the price. If you can play the game, so much the better. If you can't figure out the rules, then make up your own, so you can still use the playing pieces."

Colin Reynolds reviewed Magic Realm for White Dwarf #19, giving it an overall rating of 7 out of 10, and stated that "As a game, it excels. The programmed instruction by use of Encounters allows the rules to be grasped slowly but surely, and the colourful board and counters set the scene and create the atmosphere. As a FRP game, D&D is a better buy, but as a game Magic Realm has a flavour all its own."

In Issue 79 of the UK magazine Games & Puzzles, Nick Palmer called the game "a plunge into the deep end of fantasy gaming for the hitherto conventionally-oriented Avalon Hill, and while it has many strong points the published product was badly finished." However, Palmer found the game "highly innovative." He concluded by giving the game an Excitement rating of 3 out of 5, saying, "If you are interested in a relatively simple and well-defined introduction to fantasy role-playing, the game might meet your needs."

In a retrospective review of Magic Realm in Black Gate, Jeff Stehman said "Players choose their own victory conditions, setting goals of Gold, Fame, Notoriety, Usable Spells, and Great Treasures. They travel roads, caves, hidden paths and secret passages that stretch across the twenty tiles making up the board, and you're not likely to see the same board configuration twice."

== Reviews ==
- The Playboy Winner's Guide to Board Games
