= Panzer Leader =

Panzer Leader may refer to:

- Panzer Leader (book), by German general Heinz Guderian
- Panzer Leader (game), from the Avalon Hill game company
