= October War: Doctrine and Tactics in the Yom Kippur Conflict, 1973 =

Board wargame published in 1977

The cover of Strategy & Tactics #61, which contained October War as a pull-out game

October War: Doctrine and Tactics in the Yom Kippur Conflict, 1973 is a board wargame published by Simulations Publications, Inc. (SPI) in 1977 that simulates the Yom Kippur War.

== Background ==
On 6 October 1973, the Jewish holy day of Yom Kippur, an Arab coalition led by Egypt and Syria jointly launched a surprise attack against Israel with the strategic objectives of recovering the Sinai Peninsula and the Golan Heights, both of which Israel had occupied following the 1967 Six Day War.

== Description ==
October War is a two-player board wargame at the tactical platoon/company level with tactical armored combat where one player controls the forces of the Arab Coalition, and the other controls the Israeli forces. One generic hex grid map is used interchangeably with all the scenarios. With only 200 counters and 12 pages of rules, this game is not considered very complex.

The game comes with eight individual scenarios representing various battles that took place during the war, four of them on the Golan Heights, four of them in the Sinai. Each takes 15 to 20 turns. There is also a campaign game that links the Golan Heights scenarios together, and a campaign game linking the Sinai scenarios together.

== Publication history ==
October War was designed by Irad Hardy, who revised the rules from SPI's 1975 wargame MechWar '77. The result was published by SPI as a free pull-out game in Issue 61 of Strategy & Tactics (March–April 1977) with graphic design by Redmond A. Simonsen. It was also offered for sale as a boxed set. The game failed to find an audience, and never cracked SPI's Top Ten Bestseller List.

== Reception ==
In The Guide to Simulations/Games for Education and Training, Martin Campion thought this game "gives some feeling of realism without great rules complexity." He felt that October War successfully "suggests the reasons for Israeli tactical superiority and shows other factors that influenced the fighting in the Middle East." He also noted that for players looking to explore the subject further, "The game equipment can easily be used to develop other scenarios on the war."

In Issue 13 of The Journal of 20th-Century Wargames, Marion Bates acknowledged the use of revised MechWar '77 rules, saying, "The results are usually an improvement, but at times the cure is worse than the disease." Bates used the alternating movement rules as an example, pointing out "in scenarios with heavy unit density, it is easy to forget which units have moved or fired." However, Bates felt that changes to panic, disruption, and overrun were all improvements, saying, "The result is both a better game and a better simulation." Bates concluded by calling October War "an outstanding alternative to Avalon Hill's [The Arab-Israeli Wars]."

== Awards ==
At the 1978 Origins Awards, October War was a finalist for a Charles S. Roberts Award in the category "Best Tactical Game of 1977."

== Other reviews and commentary ==
- Fire & Movement #8
- The Wargamer Vol.1 #2
- Ann Arbour Wargamer #8
- Line of Departure #52
