= Destruction of Jerusalem (disambiguation) =

Siege of Jerusalem, fall of Jerusalem, or sack of Jerusalem may refer to:

== Battles ==
- Siege of Jebus (ca. 1010 BC); according to biblical narrative, David, king of the United Kingdom of Israel, captures Jebus
- Sack of Jerusalem (925 BC), by Pharaoh Shishak, from biblical narrative
- Siege of Jerusalem, during the Syro-Ephraimite War (736–732 BCE); unsuccessful
- Assyrian siege of Jerusalem (701 BCE) by Sennacherib, king of the Neo-Assyrian Empire; unsuccessful
- Siege of Jerusalem (597 BC) by Nebuchadnezzar II of the Neo-Babylonian Empire, during Judah's first revolt against Babylon; successful
- Siege of Jerusalem (587 BC) and destruction of the city and the First Temple by Nebuchadnezzar II, during Judah's second revolt against Babylon
- Siege of Jerusalem (168 BC) by Seleucid king Antiochus IV Epiphanes after revolt by Jason; successful
- Siege of Jerusalem (162 BC) by Seleucid general Lysias; unsuccessful
- Siege of Jerusalem (134 BC) by Seleucid king Antiochus VII Sidetes during the reign of John Hyrcanus; successful
- Siege of Jerusalem (67 BC) by Aristobulus II of Judea against his brother, beginning the Hasmonean civil war; successful
- Siege of Jerusalem (65 BC, maybe into 64 BC) by Hyrcanus II and allied Nabataeans against his brother Aristobulus II; unsuccessful
- Siege of Jerusalem (63 BC) by Pompey the Great, intervening in the Hasmonean Civil War; successful
- Siege of Jerusalem (37 BC) by Herod the Great, ending Hasmonean rule over Judea
- Siege of Jerusalem (70 CE) and destruction of the city and the Second Temple by Titus, ending the major phase of the First Jewish–Roman War
- Sasanian conquest of Jerusalem (614) by Shahrbaraz during the Byzantine–Sasanian War of 602–628
- Siege of Jerusalem (636–637) by Khalid ibn al-Walid during the Muslim conquest of the Levant; successful
- Siege of Jerusalem (1099) by the Crusaders in the First Crusade; successful
- Siege of Jerusalem (1187) by Saladin; successful
- Siege of Jerusalem (1244) by Khwarazmian mercenary army associated with the Ayyubids; Crusaders lose the city for good
- Siege of Jerusalem (1834) by Arab villagers during the 1834 Peasants' revolt in Palestine; unsuccessful
- Battle of Jerusalem (1917), the city is captured by British and Commonwealth forces during the Sinai and Palestine campaign of World War I
- Battle for Jerusalem during the 1948 Arab–Israeli War, ending in armistice and the city being split between Israel and Jordan
- Capture of East Jerusalem by Israel (1967), during the Six-Day War

== Other uses ==
- Siege of Jerusalem (poem), a 14th-century poem depicting the events of 70 CE
- The Siege of Jerusalem, a 1976 board wargame that simulates the events of 70 CE

== See also ==
- Jerusalem attack (disambiguation)
- Timeline of Jerusalem
