= Squad Leader Scenarios =

Squad Leader Scenarios (SL) is a tactical board wargame created by Avalon Hill (Hasbro Gaming) that focuses on infantry combat during the Second World War. Players use map boards and counters to control small units of soldiers, vehicles, and weapons.

In the game, situations are presented to players in the form of scenarios, typically including a map, a set of forces, and a set of victory conditions. The original Squad Leader game comes with 12 scenarios, and additional scenarios, numbered in sequence, follow in the three sequel games. There are also many "official" Scenarios in The General or sold as special releases (the Rogue Scenarios).

In total, 123 official scenarios were made for the Squad Leader series.

== Scenario format ==
Each scenario in the original four-game releases was printed on an 8-1/2" × 11" cardstock with the scenario number, an illustrative graphic, and a historical overview of the aftermath of the event depicted. Rodger MacGowan did the artwork for the original SL, COI and COD Scenarios and Charles Kibler took over with GI: Anvil of Victory.

The original core Scenarios from the 4 games are numbered as follows:

- Squad Leader – 1 through 12
- Cross of Iron – 13 through 20
- Crescendo of Doom – 21 through 32
- GI: Anvil of Victory – 33 through 47

=== Rules sections ===
The four Squad Leader games use Programmed Instruction to teach the game system; each scenario included with the games lists the new rules introduced with that Scenario.

Squad Leader scenarios come with specific victory conditions, which vary depending on the nature of the scenario. Some common victory conditions include:

- Assault on a Village: Certain buildings within the village must be occupied and held.
- Withdrawal: A specific number of units must be exfiltrated from the map.
- Defense of a Bridge: Players must hold a bridge against enemy attacks for a set number of turns.
- Rescue Mission: Units on one side need to secure another group of trapped units, then escort them to safety.
- Encirclement: A significant portion of the opposing force must be surrounded and eliminated.

== Official Scenarios ==
Game	#	Name	Allies	Axis	Date	Location
SL	1	The Guards Counterattack			6 October 1942	Stalingrad, USSR
SL	2	The Tractor Works			6 October 1942	Stalingrad, USSR
SL	3	The Streets of Stalingrad			6 October 1942	Stalingrad, USSR
SL	4	The Hedgehog of Piepsk			14 November 1941	Piersk, USSR
SL	5	Hill 621			1 July 1944	near Minsk, USSR
SL	6	Escape From Velikiye Luki			12 January 1943	Velikiye Luki, USSR
SL	7	Buchholz Station			16 December 1944	Buchholz, Germany
SL	8	The Bitche Salient			14 January 1945	Bitche, Germany
SL	9	The Cannes Strongpoint			23 August 1944	Cannes, France
SL	10	Hitdorf on the Rhine			6 April 1945	Hitdorf, Germany
SL	11	The St. Goar Assault			24 March 1945	St Goar, Germany
SL	12	The Road to Wiltz			17 December 1944	Wiltz, Luxembourg
COI	13	The Capture of Balta			3 August 1941	Balta, Ukraine
COI	14	The Paw of the Tiger			12 January 1943	South of Leningrad, USSR
COI	15	Hube's Pocket			6 April 1944	near Buchach, USSR
COI	16	Sowchos 79			8 December 1942	Chir River Line, Russia
COI	17	Debacle at Korosten			30 August 1941	Korosten, Ukraine
COI	18	The Defense of Luga			19 July 1941	Luga, USSR
COI	19	A Winter Melee			17 February 1942	Okorovo, Russia
COI	20	Breakout From Borisov			2 July 1941	Borisov, Russia
COD	21	Battle for the Warta Line			6 September 1939	Central Poland
COD	22	The Borders are Burning			30 November 1939	Kuhmo, Finland
COD	23	Silent Death			9 December 1939	Aittojoki, Finland
COD	24	Action at Balberkamp			22 April 1940	Balberkamp, Norway
COD	25	Resistance at Chabrehez			10 May 1940	Chabrehez, Belgium
COD	26	Assault on a Queen			11 May 1940	The Hague, Netherlands
COD	27	The Dinant Bridgehead			13 May 1940	Houx, Belgium
COD	28	Counterstroke at Stonne			15 May 1940	Stonne, France
COD	29	In Rommel's Wake			17 May 1940	on the Meuse, France
COD	30	Ad Hoc at Beaurains			21 May 1940	Arras, France
COD	31	Chateau de Quesnoy			6 June 1940	Le Quesnoy, France
COD	32	Rehearsal for Crete			26 April 1941	Peloponnesus, Greece
GI	33	A Belated Christmas			27 December 1944	Bastogne, Belgium
GI	34	Climax at Nijmegen Bridge			20 September 1944	Nijmegen, Netherlands
GI	35	The French Decide to Fight			10 November 1942	Port-Lyautey, Morocco
GI	36	Weissenhof Crossroads			16 December 1944	Schnee Eifel, Germany
GI	37	Medal of Honor			21 September 1944	Nijmegen, Netherlands
GI	38	The Factory			11 February 1944	Aprilia Settlement, Italy
GI	39	Sweep For Bordj Toum Bridge			10 December 1942	Bordj Toum Station, Tunisia
GI	40	The Dornot Watermark			10 September 1944	Dornot, Germany
GI	41	Swatting at Tigers			11 July 1943	Biazzo Ridge, Italy
GI	42	Bridgehead on the Rhine			24 March 1945	Speldrop, Germany
GI	43	Action at Kommerscheidt			4 November 1944	Kommerscheidt, Germany
GI	44	Prelude to Breakout			7 July 1944	Vire et Taute Canal, France
GI	45	Hide and Seek			7 June 1944	Normandy, France
GI	46	Operation Varsity			24 March 1945	near Hamminkeln, Germany
GI	47	Encircling the Ruhr			30 March 1945	the Ruhr, Germany

=== Other official Scenarios (Avalon Hill) ===
==== Series 100 ====
Avalon Hill released Series 100, ten new Scenarios for Cross of Iron, in 1979. The Scenarios were designed by Courtney Allen (SL playtester and designer of Storm Over Arnhem).

#	Title	Allies	Axis	Date	Location
101	Blocking Action at Lipki			3 July 1941	near Borisov, USSR
102	Slamming of the Door			17 August 1941	Panikovo forest, USSR
103	Bald Hill			11 September 1941	Leningrad, USSR
104	The Penetration of Rostov			24 July 1942	Rostov, USSR
105	Night Battle at Noromatyevka			1 January 1943	Noromaryevka, USSR
106	Beachhead at Ozereyka Bay			4 February 1943	Ozereyka valley, USSR
107	Disaster On The Dneiper Loop			24 September 1943	Dnieper River, USSR
108	Block Busting in Bokruisk			29 June 1944	Bokruisk, USSR
109	Counterattack On The Vistula			6 August 1944	near Wola Chodkowska, Poland
110	The Agony of Doom			19 April 1945	Muncheberg, Germany

==== Series 200 ====
Avalon Hill released Series 200 with 10 new Scenarios for Crescendo of Doom.

#	Title	Allies	Axis	Date	Location
201	Sacrifice Of Polish Armor			1 September 1939	Novy Targ region, Poland
202	Under Cover Of Darkness			12 September 1939	Gdynia, Poland
203	Bitter Defense At Otta			28 April 1940	Gudbrandsal valley, Norway
204	Chance D'une Affaire			14 May 1940	Chehery, France
205	Last Defense Line			15 May 1940	Bouvellemont, France
206	Fighting At The World's Edge			28 May 1940	Tarladsvikfjell, Norway
207	The French Perimeter			2 June 1940	Spyckar, France
208	Road To Kozani Pass			13 April 1941	Komanos, Greece
209	The Akroiri Peninsula Defense			20 May 1941	Profitilias, Crete
210	Commando Raid At Dieppe			18 August 1942	Varengeville, France

==== Rogue Series 200 ====
The Rogue Scenarios Series 200, named because they used boards 9, 10 and 11 which were not "official" boards at the time, used rules from the Crescendo of Doom. Some of the Scenarios needed multiple copies of several boards.

#	Title	Allies	Axis	Date	Location
R211	Auld Lang Syne			1 January 1945	Gerimont, France
R212	On The Road To Andalsnes			24 April 1940	near Andalsnes, Norway
R213	Traverse Right...FIRE!			23 June 1941	S of Bialystok, Poland
R214	The Front In Flames			22 August 1943	S of Kharkov, USSR
R215	Hasty Pudding			27 May 1940	near Dunkirk, France
R216	A Small Town In Germany			8 April 1945	Friesoythe, Germany
R217	The Whirlwind			18 April 1945	Aschaffenburg, Germany
R218	Operation Switchback			6 October 1944	Scheldt estuary, Holland
R219	Scheldt Fortress South			25 October 1944	Scheldt estuary, Holland
R220	Clearing the Breskens Pocket			6 October 1944	Scheldt estuary, Holland
R221	Vitality I			24 October 1944	South Beveland, Holland
R222	Infatuate II			1 November 1944	Westkapelle, Walcheren Island, Holland
R223	Night Drop			6 June 1944	Cherbourg Peninsula, France

==== Series 300 ====
Avalon Hill released Series 300 with additional Scenarios for GI: Anvil of Victory.

#	Title	Allies	Axis	Date	Location
300	Trial by Combat			27 February 1945	Elsdrof, Germany
301	The Clearing			10 October 1944	Huertgen Forest, Germany
302	Stand Fast			10 December 1944	Obergeich, Germany
303	Thrust and Parry			15 March 1945	Pfaffenheck, Germany
304	Riposte			15 March 1945	Pfaffenheck, Germany
305	The Duel			15 March 1945	Pfaffenheck, Germany
306	The Rag Tag Circus			12 April 1945	Barby on the Elbe, Germany
307	Point D'Appui			9 October 1944	Bardebberg, Germany
308	Han-Sur-Neid			11 November 1944	Han-sur-Neid, France
309	The Roer Bridgehead			23 February 1945	Koerrenzig, Germany

==== The General Magazine ====
Over the years, Avalon Hill also released Scenarios in issues of their magazine The General.

#	ID	Title	Allies	Axis	Date	Location
15–6	A	Burzevo			2 December 1941	Burzevo, USSR
15–6	B	Hill 253.5			9 July 1943	North of Kursk, USSR
15–6	C	The Burkin Bridgehead			24 September 1943	SE of Kiev, Ukraine
15–6	D	Delaying Action			30 October 1944	Western Lithuania
17–2	E	The Niscemi-Biscari Highway			10 July 1943	Biscari, Sicily
17–2	F	The Pouppeville Exit			6 June 1944	Normandy, France
17–2	G	Devil's Hill			19 September 1944	Kleve-Nijmegen, Holland
17–2	H	The Attempt to Relieve Peiper			21 December 1944	the Ardennes, Belgium
17–2	I	Hunters from the Sky			24 March 1945	Rhine river, Germany
18–2	J	Semper Paratus			27 September 1944	Oorderen, Holland
18–3	K	Fast Heinz			7 August 1944	Roslayl, USSR
18–4	L	The Long Road			16 September 1942	S of Andriba, Madagascar
18–5	M	The Dead of Winter			29 December 1941	NW of Staritsa, Russia
19–5	TS1	First Crisis at Army Group North			25 June 1941	Daugav river, USSR
19–5	TS2	Pavlov's House			20 October 1942	Stalingrad, USSR
19–5	TS3	Land Leviathans			3 July 1941	Lipki, USSR
19–5	TS4	Soldiers of Destruction			10 October 1944	Radzymin, Poland
19–6	N	Faugh A'Ballagh!			16 May 1944	Sinagoga, Italy
20–2	1000	Operation Marston			14 July 1943	Catania, Sicily
20–4	O	Strayer's Strays			6 June 1944	Normandy, France
20–6	SSTK 1a	Death's Head at Lusho			24 September 1941	Lusho, USSR
20–6	SSTK 1b	Death's Head at Lusho			24 September 1941	Lusho, USSR
21–2	P	Aachen's Pall			25 October 1944	Aachen, Germany
21–3	Q	Gambit			21 May 1941	Maleme, Crete
21–4	2000	Operation Hubertus			11 November 1942	Stalingrad, USSR
22–5	3000	Assault on Round Top			30 September 1944	north of Riga, Latvia

=== ASL Annual ===
The final "official" Scenarios issued by Avalon Hill for the original Squad Leader game were in the first two issues of the ASL Annual.

Issue	#	Title	Allies	Axis	Date	Location
ASL Annual '89	A1	On the Borderline			30 November 1939	Artahuhta, Finland
ASL Annual '89	A2	Sbeitla Probe			17 February 1943	Sbeitla, Tunisia
ASL Annual '89	A3	Regalbuto Ridge			31 July 1943	Regalbuto, Italy
ASL Annual '90	A4	King's Castle			26 November 1944	Frenzenberg, Germany
ASL Annual '90	A5	The Professionals			7 April 1941	Pirot, Yugoslavia
ASL Annual '90	A6	A Meeting of Patrols			26 December 1944	Hofen, Belgium
ASL Annual '92	ACG	Commando Campaign Game				

All official Squad Leader Scenarios printed by Avalon Hill have been reissued for Advanced Squad Leader and released in either The General, ASL Annuals, or scenario packs. The ASL Journal had released seven Scenarios for Squad Leader but Multi-Man Publishing has indicated no intention to support the original SL game system.

==== Non-official scenarios ====
The Wargamer also released Scenarios 81–90 and a pack with Scenarios 91–100 in 1982. These were designed by contributors.

Scenario 81	A Bridge Too Near
Scenario 82	To Lose A Battle
Scenario 83	The Final Attempt
Scenario 84	Le Paradis
Scenario 85	The Far Bank
Scenario 86	Raid on Vaagso
Scenario 87	The Bruneval Raid
Scenario 88	The Backwater of War
Scenario 89	Cherkasskoye
Scenario 90	The Bridge at Kanev
Scenario 91	Assault At Wadelincourt
Scenario 92	Patton's End Run
Scenario 93	Cassino Station
Scenario 94	Hill 112
Scenario 95	The Attempt To Exploit
Scenario 96	Scratch Force
Scenario 97	The Breaking Wave
Scenario 98	Night Assault
Scenario 99	Cooperative Venture
Scenario 100	A Day At The Races
