= Desert War: Tactical Warfare in North Africa =

Board wargame published in 1973

Desert War (1973)

Desert War: Tactical Warfare in North Africa is a board wargame published in 1973 by Simulations Publications, Inc. (SPI) that simulates combat in North Africa during World War II.

== Contents ==
Desert War is a two-player platoon-level tactical wargame in which one player controls Allied forces and the other player Axis forces.

=== Gameplay ===
With a large 22" x 34" paper hex grid map and 400 counters, and simultaneous movement — tracked on movement pads — the game is relatively complex. The game comes with five generic (non-historical) scenarios: "Armored Assault", "Meeting Engagement", "Infantry Defense", "Minefield Defense", and "Raid on Leager". Once a scenario has been picked, the players choose the time frame, which will determine available weapons and armor: early 1941, late 1941, early 1942, late 1942, and early 1943. As critic Duncan K. Smith noted, "Of course the later the year, the more modern the weapons. The Germans have the advantage in the early scenarios but as the years go by, and the Allied tanks improve, the Germans lose their edge completely."

== Publication history ==
In the first years of its existence, SPI produced several tank combat wargames, including PanzerBlitz (1970), Combat Command (1972) and KampfPanzer (1973). SPI game designers Jim Dunnigan and Redmond A. Simonsen took elements from each of the three previous games and produced Desert War, a non-historical game of desert combat, which was published in 1973.

== Reception ==
In a 1976 poll carried out by SPI to determine the most popular board wargames in North America, Desert War placed 65th out of 202 games.

In Issue 55 of The Pouch, Duncan K. Smith liked the simultaneous move system, claiming that "moves for twenty pieces can be written in five minutes." The only disappointment Smith had with the game was the lack of historical scenarios. He noted that "SPI explains the lack of historical scenarios by saying that there must have been countless engagements throughout the war — just like the ones they have provided. This isn't good enough for me." Smith concluded, "Desert War is a fun game. [...] My only complaint lies with the scenarios. If you like a fun, fast moving game, this game is for you, but if you like historical simulations in the true sense of the word, this game is not for you."

In Issue 21 of the UK wargaming magazine Phoenix, Geoff Barnard grouped Desert War with its predecessors PanzerBlitz, Panzer '44, and KampfPanzer, saying that they all "tend to keep their eye firmly set on the tanks, the infantry plod along [...] and play a very subordinate role. [...] they are based on certain ideals of the cut and thrust of armoured combat, the type of action that would take place at the very focal point of an armoured attack. They are a tank commander's Dream World!"

In The Guide to Simulations/Games for Education and Training, Martin Campion commented on using Desert War as an educational tool, saying that when he had used it in classes, it had been popular. However, Campion noted that "it is nearly impossible for any British force to beat a German force, while the Italians are just as easily defeated by the British [...] Infantry is worthless and helpless against tanks, and antitank guns are easily spotted and destroyed. I do not believe these are correct lessons." Campion suggested the game "ought to be used [in the classroom] cautiously."

== Other reviews and commentary ==
- Moves #14
- Strategy & Tactics #45
- Fire & Movement #10 & #60
- Panzerfaust #74
- Outposts #5
- Ann Arbor Wargaming #10
- Albion #48
