= Geomorphic mapboard =

A geomorphic mapboard is a game board that can be configured in different ways and reused to create different playing surfaces. The mapboards are made geomorphic by using identical features along the edges of the maps, so that any two may be paired.

== History ==
The concept was introduced in PanzerBlitz, though the number of configurations was low. This is the moment when "geo-morphic" gets in wargaming its peculiar meaning. The back of the game box described among the contents a “three section ‘Geo-Morphic’ mapboard which can be rearranged to form dozens of different terrain configurations”. Geo-morphic was there used in the established sense of "resembling the earth and its surface features." But several gamers thought that "can be rearranged to form dozens of different terrain configurations" was the explanation of that unusual adjective, and from then onward the possibility to rearrange pieces became part of the definition of "geo-morphic" among wargamers. Even game publishers started using the word with this new meaning on their printed material, so that the use became widespread and somehow "official" in the hobby community.

Many tactical wargames use geomorphic mapboards, and they also appear in Robo Rally, Magic Realm, and occasional other games.

The concept is embraced by Advanced Squad Leader (ASL), which has 60+ geomorphic mapboards as of 2006. ASL increases this flexibility with the addition of "overlays" to permit further changes to the playing area.
