= Schnellboote (wargame) =

197 board wargame

Schnellboote, subtitled "Tactical Small Craft Warfare, 1941–1945," is a board wargame published by Simulations Canada in 1984 that simulates various naval engagements involving small craft such as PT boats and E boats. It was the third in a series of three interlocking naval wargames.

== Description ==
Schnellboote is a two-person wargame in which one player controls one or more small craft and the other controls opposing forces. It is played on a large (22" x 28") featureless hex grid map where each hex represents 100 yards (91 metres), and each turn represents 90 seconds of game time.

Movement of both players is simultaneous, with each player preplotting their movement for the turn, and then revealing them at the same time. The turn then takes the following sequence, all done simultaneously for both players:

1. Search
2. Gunfire
3. Ship Movement
4. Aircraft Movement and Bombing
5. Torpedo launching and movement (Torpedo movement is logged secretly until the torpedo is placed on the map when it is one hex from its target. Before it is revealed, the targeted ship has a chance to spot the incoming torpedo and take evasive action if possible.)

== Publication history ==
Steven Newberg created a series of three naval wargames that used the same rules system: IJN (1978), which contained the basic rules for movement and combat; Torpedo! (1979), which added rules for submarines and anti-submarine searches; and Schnellboote, which added rules for torpedo boats and other small craft. All three were published by Simulations Canada. Combining the three games, players could design scenarios for any naval engagement in any theatre of World War II. Newberg later wrote, "Scenarios tended to be fast and vicious, with either lots of casualties if the range got short, or a scattered confusion when closing did not happen. Pretty close to how these things actually went. This final title brought the series [of three games] up to almost 1,000 counters and coverage of every country and [naval vessel] combat class type of the war.

== Reception ==
In Issue 102 of Strategy & Tactics, Douglas Niles commented, "For aficianados of tactical naval games, Schnellboote has a lot to offer. This seems to be the area where SimCan does its best work, and their standards of accuracy and playability in naval games are displayed here." Niles liked the relatively simple rules, noting, "Schnellboote avoids a lot of the complexity that is so common to tactical naval games, yet retains a high level of accuracy." Niles concluded, "The scenarios can be fast, wild, and fierce, successful attributes of any successful wargame."

In a retrospective review written twenty years after this game's publication, Joe Scoleri commented "With about six pages of rules (including tables), Schnellboote is a comparatively simple game, quick to set up and play. The downside of this is that the tactical depth is rather limited: the only really effective weapon in the game is the torpedo, and only then when it is fired at a range where it will reach its target within the turn at which it is launched, giving the target no time to outmaneuver it. That way, both players must usually aim for point-blank shots." Scoleri concluded, "Overall, for the time at it was published, the game is quite good, but cannot really live up to today's expectations. Still, I would make the point that the game is probably the best tactical naval game system that can be described in six pages of rules."

== Reviews ==
- Game News #6 (Aug., 1985)
