= Grunt (board wargame) =

Vietnam War board wargame published in 1971

- Strategy & Tactics #26 that contained the pull-out wargame Grunt
- Designers: John Young
- Publishers: Simulations Publications
- Publication: 1971
- Genres: Vietnam War

Grunt, subtitled "The Game of Tactical Level Combat in Vietnam", is a tactical level board wargame published by Simulations Publications, Inc. (SPI) in 1971, set in the Vietnam War. It was the first board wargame to focus on squad level combat, and the second to simulate parts of the Vietnam War, which was still ongoing at the time this game was published. Designed by John Young, the two-player game simulates combat between American and Viet Cong forces, and was later updated and republished as Search & Destroy in 1975.

== Description ==
Grunt is a 2-player wargame that simulates non-urban squad- or platoon-level combat between American forces and Viet Cong (VC) guerrilla forces during the period of American involvement in the Vietnam War. The American player must deploy forces to search the map for caches of equipment and food. The VC player tries to cause unacceptable American casualties. The game comes with three scenarios, all only 10 turns long.

=== Components ===
The game includes:

- 22" x 28" paper hex grid map printed in black and tan at a scale of 100 yards (91.5 m) per hex.
- 100 counters
- rule booklet
- game charts and tables

=== Set-up ===
The VC player chooses how many elite VC, VC militia, snipers and booby-traps to use — the fewer chosen, the fewer Victory Points are required to win — and places them face down on the board, along with Vietnamese peasants and porters.

The American player then deploys units onto the map, using no fewer than four helicopters. Units can also be brought onto the board via road.

=== Turns ===
Grunt uses an alternating "I Go, You Go" system where one player moves and fires, then the other player has the same opportunity. Each turn represents six minutes of game time.

=== Movement ===
Each unit has six movement points (MP). Plain terrain uses 1 MP, broken terrain uses 2 MP and jungle costs 3 MP.

=== Searching ===
When American units move on top of a VC counter, it is turned over and revealed. If it is a Viet Cong, militia or sniper unit, the American unit is bounced back into its previous hex and combat results. If the counter is a cache, the American must spend one turn on top of the cache without moving or firing. At the end of that turn, the American player can either capture or destroy the cache. Capturing the cache is worth more Victory Points, but if the unit is subsequently pinned down during combat, the cache is dropped, and an American unit will have to spend a non-firing turn picking it up again.

Strategy & Tactics #26 that contained the pull-out wargame Grunt

=== Combat ===
Every unit has a firing range of 8 hexes, but this is reduced to 4 hexes by broken hexes and to 0 hexes by jungle. Terrain adds a defensive value equal to its movement cost: plain terrain gives a defensive value of 1, jungle adds 4. The standard American squad has a combat strength of 2. The elite VC units also have a strength of 2, militia and snipers have a strength of 1. Booby traps attack as if they had a 3-to-1 advantage.

The American player must be careful about firing at unidentified units. If the unit turns out to be a civilian, then the American player will lose Victory Points.

=== Victory conditions ===
Americans gain Victory Points for capturing or destroying caches, and for inflicting casualties. VC gain Victory Points by inflicting casualties. Both players lose Victory Points for inflicting civilian casualties. At the end of 10 turns, the player with the most Victory Points is the winner.

== Publication history ==
In March 1971, Issue 26 of SPI's house magazine Strategy & Tactics included a free pull-out game designed by John Young titled Grunt, the then widely used term for an army private. It was not only SPI's first contemporary game, set in what was at the time the still on-going Vietnam War, but also the first squad-level combat wargame ever published, just the second wargame to focus on the Vietnam War, and also SPI's first magazine-published game that included a sheet of die-cut counters. Grunt was later published as a boxed set.

By 1974, after several rival game companies published tactical-level games with better rules, SPI revised, updated and republished several of their older games. One of these was a new edition of Grunt, retitled Search & Destroy, published by SPI in 1975.

== Reception ==
In Issue 31 of Albion (July 1971), Don Turnbull noted some issues with the supplied counters, specifically not enough Vietcong counters and too many American counters. He also was not pleased with the lack of clarity in the rulebook, commenting, "the poor construction of the text makes it quite an onerous task to get to grips with the game, and makes the play itself frustrating in constant reference to that section of the rules which you have seen somewhere but just can't find at the moment." Turnbull also mentioned the lack of rules about VC snipers. "Unless you invent a rule to cover the omission, all they can do is sit around in trees watching the US go by." He concluded by giving the game a poor rating, saying, "the shortcomings in the game are too great a handicap to allow me the enjoy the play [...] there is no excuse for poor layout of the rules, since that betokens poor play-testing, which is itself inexcusable."

In Issue 23 of Moves (October–November 1975), Phil Kosnett thought Grunt did not compare favorably to its descendant, Search & Destroy. Kosnett found Grunt's black and tan map "ugly". He also found the rules dis-organized, saying of the "sloppy work" done with the rule book, "Most (not all) of the rules are in there someplace, but in such disorder that it can take half an hour to dig them out." He also had issues with some of the rules, including unit stacking, and especially extended field-of-fire. He concluded that Search & Destroy was a far superior product, commenting "Search & Destroy is well worth buying, even if you own Grunt."

In Issue 18 of Fire & Movement, Rodger B. MacGowan commented that "Grunt does an excellent job of capturing the period 'feel' and flavor of the war in Vietnam in the mid-1960s." MacGowan noted that "there are rules covering U.S. air strikes, Medevac evacuation by helicopter of U.S. casualties, 'body count' victory points, NLF ambushes and booby traps. In short, the bitter realities of the tragic conflict."

Over a decade later, another review appeared in Fire & Movement. Nick Stasnopolis noted the unique leadership rules for both sides that accurately reflected reality. For the VC player, he noted that "To use their full capabilities the NLF [National Leadership Front, or Viet Cong] units must be within eight hexes of their cadre. This reflects their lack of modern communications equipment, which produced a reliance on written messages and sound signals, thus limiting operational radius." Stasnolopis noted that the myriad radios used by the Americans allowed them to operate as far away from their leader as desired, but "Unfortunately, this also produced a dependence on contact with higher headquarters [...] U.S. squads can be paralyzed for up to three turns if the squad radioman is hit or their headquarters takes casualties."

== Other reviews ==
- Panzerfaust Magazine #69
- Pursue & Destroy Vol.1, #6
