= Torpedo! (wargame) =

197 board wargame

Cover art by Rodger B. MacGowan

Torpedo!, subtitled "A Tactical Study of Submarine and Anti-Submarine Warfare, 1941–1945," is a board wargame published by Simulations Canada in 1979 that simulates various naval engagements involving submarines World War II. It was the second in a series of three interlocking naval wargames.

== Description ==
Torpedo! is a two-person wargame in which one player controls one or more submarines and the other controls the forces searching for the submarine or protecting a target ship. It is played on a large (22" x 28") featureless hex grid map where each hex represents 100 yards (91 metres), and each turn represents 90 seconds of game time.

Scenarios vary from a single submarine versus a destroyer to large combined forces involving submarines, surface ships and airplanes.

Movement of both players is simultaneous, with each player preplotting their movement for the turn, and then revealing them at the same time. The turn then takes the following sequence, all done simultaneously for both players:

1. Search
2. Gunfire
3. Ship Movement
4. Aircraft Movement and Bombing
5. Torpedo launching and movement (Torpedo movement is logged secretly until the torpedo is placed on the map when it is one hex from its target. Before it is revealed, the targeted ship has a chance to spot the incoming torpedo and take evasive action if possible.)

In addition to rules about submarines, torpedoes and anti-submarine defenses, the game includes rules for convoys, anti-submarine aircraft and min-submarines.

== Publication history ==
Steven Newberg created a series of three naval wargames that used the same rules system: IJN (1978), which contained the basic rules for movement and combat; Torpedo! (1979), which added rules for submarines and anti-submarine searches; and Schnellboote, which added rules for PT boats and other small craft. All three were published by Simulations Canada with cover art by Rodger B. MacGowan. Using the three games together, players could design scenarios for any naval engagement in any theatre of World War II.

== Reception ==
Kirk Stroup, in Fire & Movement, commented, "While the game does not exactly bog down in paperwork — only sighted units are allowed on the board and search must be executed during each turn — there are moments when it resembles blind chess." Although Stroup identified a number of problems and glitches, he concluded on a positive note, saying, "A fun game to play, and one that is quite tense at times."

In Issue 11 of The Grenadier, Karl Wiegers complained that "The effort invested by the designer in creating so many scenarios is pretty much lost in the abstraction of the game system; the tactical finesse needed by both participants in a submarine battle does not readily surface in Torpedo! It plays more like an episode of hide-and-go-seek than an actual World War II submarine action." Wiegers looked at the three interlocking games produced by Simulations Canada (IJN, Torpedo! and Schnellboote) and found that the identical game system used by all of them "is easy to learn, and play moves quite rapidly ... Despite some shortcomings in realism, the main attraction of the games is their high playability." However, Weigers admitted that the lack of realism could be a problem for some players, writing, "the gamer with a serious interest in WWII naval combat will only be partially satisfied ...The level of abstraction is just too great to be very rewarding, and all sorts of historically unreasonable things can happen in the course of a scenario."

In Issue 11 of The Wargamer, Jim Hind found major problems with the game, writing, "Somewhere in the heart of Torpedo! there seems to be a workable system. But as it stands at the moment, the whole product cries out how they lovingly playtested it and proofread it, then depthcharged the results." Hind concluded "This Torpedo! is a dud."

Cliff Sayre reviewed all three of Simulations Canada's naval games and felt that the designer "has done an excellent job of retaining those aspects which should be significant in a naval game and yet retained a high degree of playability and simplicity." Sayre did feel that perhaps luck was more important than skill, noting, "Luck of the die roll is a considerable factor in the games ... Winning does call for skill, but there will be times when the dice may rule." Despite this, Sayre concluded on a positive not, saying, "I have enjoyed the three games very much. The game system offers features which are not available in any other games."

In a retrospective review written almost twenty-five years after this game's publication, Joe Scoleri didn't like the highly abstracted air rules, writing, "In short, if you are an air combat gamer looking for something with a more hard-core air-naval focus, this might not be your cup of tea. But if you are a naval gamer looking for a 'does-it-all' World War II system with a different flavor than the average tactical naval game, this is worth a look."
