= Search & Destroy: Tactical Combat Vietnam 1965–1966 =

Vietnam War board wargame published in 1975

Search & Destroy: Tactical Combat Vietnam 1965–1966 is a tactical-level wargame published by Simulations Publications, Inc. (SPI) in 1975, set in the Vietnam War.

== Description ==
Search & Destroy is a 2-player wargame that simulates non-urban squad- or platoon-level combat between American forces and Viet Cong guerilla forces during the period of American involvement in the Vietnam War. The American player must deploy forces to search the map for caches of equipment and food. The Viet Cong player tries to prevent this, or to cause unacceptable American casualties.

== Publication history ==
In March 1971, in Issue 26 of Strategy & Tactics, SPI published a pull-out game designed by John Kramer titled Grunt. It was SPI's first contemporary game, set in what was at the time the still on-going Vietnam War, as well as the first ever wargame focused on squad-level combat. By 1974, after several rival game companies published tactical-level games with better rules, SPI revised, updated and republished several of their older games. One of these was a new edition of Grunt, designed by John Young and retitled Search & Destroy, published by SPI in 1975. As critic Joe Scoleri noted over 25 years later, "Search & Destroy, like its predecessor, Grunt, was not a popular game with the board wargamers of the time."

== Reception ==
In the August 1975 edition of Airfix Magazine, Bruce Quarrie liked the simplicity of the rules, saying, "At its most complex, Search and Destroy is still easily playable even with the American use of medical teams, heli-drops with gunship support, artillery, airstrikes, M-48 tanks, and M-113 APCs." Quarrie also noted the apparent imbalance between the powerful and technology-heavy Americans and the weaker Viet Cong is somewhat mitigated by the command structures of each.

The [VC] player has a number of independent commands and the failure of one through loss of leadership will not affect the others [...] The Americans on the other hand have a chain of command which is prone to heavy disruption at various levels by the loss of radio contact with higher command. This situation is quite well reflected in the rules, and indeed it is a joy to the [VC] player to watch the Americans rendered impotent at a stroke by a successful attack on a higher command unit.

In Issue 18 of Fire & Movement, Rodger B. MacGowan commented, "Search & Destroy never did well on the SPI Game Ratings Chart. But in my opinion this is one of the finest games on the subject still in print."

In Issue 23 of Moves (October–November 1975), Phil Kosnett thought Search & Destroy a much superior product than its predecessor, Grunt. He found the product quality much higher and more pleasing to the eye, and the rules much better organized and indexed. Kosnett liked rule changes that doubled movement, eliminated unit stacking, and eliminated extended field-of-fire. He did see problems with some rules, including medics carrying unlimited numbers of bodies without encumbrance. He concluded that "Search & Destroy is a significant step forward in the art of conflict simulation. [...] Search & Destroy is well worth buying, even if you own Grunt. It is an important addition to any gamer's library."

In Issue 69 of Panzerfaust, Pat Allen thought the game was "interesting and fairly playable" but of limited appeal due to the political nature of the American victory conditions. "This makes the game realistic, but less fun for many gamers, I think." Allen also noted that the American player gets rewarded for capturing "rice caches and administrative records. This is not quite as exciting as trying to capture Moscow or even having to destroy 4 Tiger tank platoons to win." Allen also pointed out the inherent frustrations for the American player.

He is very seldom sure what he is shooting at or where he will be shot at from. It can be pretty aggravating to lose a game just because you accidentally killed a peasant unit on the last turn. But Vietnam was that way, and so must the game be.

Allen concluded, "I do think that Search & Destroy has great appeal for some wargamers: the historians."

In Issue 73 of Fire & Movement (May/June 1991), Nick Stasnopolis called Search & Destroy "a unique game" that "goes beyond a strictly military interpretation of war to take into account the political consequences of small unit actions and how they fit into a national strategy." Stasnopolis pointed out that often players are left with frustrating choices, often based on "limited information made under difficult circumstances." He concluded, "This uncertainty makes for tense contests that are seldom decided until the final turn."

== Other reviews ==
- Pursue & Destroy, Vol. 1 #6
