= Cross of Iron (board game) =

Board wargame published in 1979

Cover art by Rodger B. MacGowan, 1979

Board 5	Forest Terrain
Scenarios: 13-20

Cross of Iron is a tactical board wargame published in 1979 by Avalon Hill as an expansion — called a "gamette" by the company — to their very popular 1977 wargame Squad Leader. The game simulates small group tactical combat during World War II on the Eastern Front.

== Description ==
Cross of Iron is a two-player wargame that builds upon the rules for Squad Leader, including:

- Expanded German and Soviet orders of battle, including Axis Minor infantry types.
- The original handful of vehicle and ordnance types in Squad Leader are expanded to include a large variety of vehicles that saw service on the Eastern Front.
- Expanded armor and artillery systems.
- The "design for effect" philosophy that had guided Squad Leader's development gave way in the case of tank combat to "actual data" taking priority over "effect data."
- The addition of white-on-black counters to represent the Waffen SS.
- Complete orders of battle for Soviets and Germans for the entire war, including dozens of different models of Sd.Kfz. 250 and 251 halftracks and PzKpfw I through VI tanks.

== Publication history ==
Even before Squad Leader debuted, plans were being made to expand the initial release; these expansions would be called "gamettes" and concentrate on particular eras or theatres, all the while developing the basic game system with additional rules, new weapons types, and different terrain.

John Hill and Don Greenwood became the creators of the first gamette, Cross of Iron, which was released by Avalon Hill in 1979 with cover art by Rodger B. MacGowan.

Hill and Greenwood initially started with the intention of providing a few extras not contained in Squad Leader, such as Waffen-SS troops, the Tiger I tank, and the T-34/85, but admitted afterwards that the project got away from them. Hill felt he had been too easily persuaded by playtesters who probably had a higher threshold for complexity than average gamers. Greenwood noted that had he known from the beginning that the gamette would end up so large, he would "have broken it into two expansion kits - it simply is too much for one."

Series 100, a package of ten extra scenarios designed by Courtney Allen, was released by Avalon Hill in 1979.

== Reception ==
In Issue 39 of the British wargaming magazine Perfidious Albion, Geoffrey Barnard commented, "Cross of Iron really demonstrates just how very wonderful, in design and especially development terms, the original Squad Leader game is. All of the additional complexities and variations of COI would seem to fit on well, as if the original game was designed with them all in mind." But Barnard questioned if the game was getting too complex and what effect that might have on the players, noting, "One could foresee gamers spending more time sorting out which parts of the rules they will play to than they spend actually playing the game." Despite this, Barnard concluded on a positive note, saying, "It's a really tasty number with stacks to appeal to the eye and add spice to the old Squad Leader original, only don't expect it to be so easy to digest."

In Special Issue #2 of Campaign, armor researcher Lorrin Bird described the impact that this game had on the war-gaming community, saying that Cross of Iron "has changed the value of the game system immensely. Now, instead of being a good infantry game, particularly with regard to support weapons and leadership effects, the system represents one of the best combined arms representations available from either a boardgame or miniatures approach." Bird further noted, "In comparison with the SL system, the new game mechanics for tanks are both terribly involved and interesting, since the degree of tank trivia has both exceeded the infantry and approached a level that only Tractics has previously attempted in the field of miniature armor rules." Bird concluded, "After suffering through the rather simplistic armor rules of Squad Leader, the publication of Cross of Iron has not only made up for the inane simplicities of its parent game but has brought into the field of armor miniatures design a host of innovative and highly sophisticated concepts."

In the 1980 book The Complete Book of Wargames, game designer Jon Freeman was impressed, saying, "This is designed to be an improvement on one of the best and most successful games around. The new armor rules are far superior to the original ones, and add a depth of feeling for the subject that had been lacking. The complexitiies of the system are effectiverly summarized on the counters themselves in a masterfully done job of graphic presentation." Freeman concluded by giving the game an Overall Evaluation of "Very Good (but only for the experienced)", saying, "This is the last word — the state of the art — in tactical armor games. With Squad Leader, it forms the most complete and realistic playable game system every published. Newcomers, of course, will have to work their way up to it gradually, but they have a treat in store when they get there."

In Issue 49 of Moves, Jeff Geisler commented, "The game is not perfect. Some rules do play weirdly: the line of sight rules, the bugbear of any tactical game, are neither well-explained nor self-evident." Geisler concluded, "Cross of Iron has interesting and occasionally useful features, but many of the rules add too much work for only a small return in fun or realism."

In Avalon Hill's house magazine The General James Collier commented, "There are few who would quibble with the appropriateness of the added dimensions of the revised vehicle and ordnance counters presented in Cross of Iron."

== Awards ==
At the 1979 Origins Awards, Cross of Iron won the Charles S. Roberts Award for Best Physical Systems & Graphics of 1978.
