= The Siege of Jerusalem =

Board game

Historical Perspective's 2nd edition Rulebook, 1980

The Siege of Jerusalem, 70 A.D. is a board wargame published by Historical Perspectives in 1976 that simulates the Roman attack on Jerusalem by Cestius Gallus. The game was subsequently bought by Avalon Hill, revised and republished in 1989.

== Description ==
The Siege of Jerusalem is a two-player game in which one player controls the besieging Roman army, and the other player controls the Jewish defenders.

=== Components ===
The 1st edition ziplock bag holds:

- a four-piece 29" x 45" cardboard hex grid map of the walled city
- 800 die-cut counters representing infantry, archers, cavalry, ladders, siege engines and towers, ramps, wall damage, and wall breaches
- Rulebook
- Game Rulebook
- Five scenario books: Rebellion, Assault on the Temple, Assault of Gallus, Night Attack, and Full Siege, which is a combination of the previous four
- Loss & Replacement Record
- Time Record
- Terrain Effects Chart
- Conference Map
- Errata Sheet
- Two sets of charts

Box cover of Avalon Hill's 3rd edition, 1989

== Gameplay ==
The Roman player's main objective is the capture of the Temple, and there is a time limit of only five phases in which to successfully complete this task. The designers reasoned that although the siege would be successful eventually, the longer the Romans took, the greater the Jewish resistance in other areas of the country would become; therefore only a short and efficient success would allow the Romans to bring the rest of the country under control.

== Publication history ==
The first edition of The Siege of Jerusalem, A.D. 70 was designed by Stephen Weiss and Fred Schacter, and published by Historical Perspectives in a ziplock bag. The designers published a second edition with errata sheets in 1980. Avalon Hill bought the rights to the game, revised and repackaged it as a boxed set, and published the resultant 3rd edition in 1989 using the shortened title The Siege of Jerusalem.

== Reception ==
In his 1977 book The Comprehensive Guide to Board Wargaming, Nicholas Palmer noted the many different units involved: "Infantry, cavalry, siege towers, battering rams, catapults, onagers, zealots, leaders." He rated the game of "Moderate complexity, fairly long."

Richard Berg, writing in Issue 32 of Moves, called the 1st edition of this game "one of the most delightful surprises of the past several months [...] a well-researched game on a relatively obscure topic [...] executed with great care and a desire to produce a 'good game'." Berg did note that the printing of the rulebooks "leaves something to be desired, in that they tend to be a bit muddy and hard to read." He also noted that some "rules can be hazy, and even confusing in spots." But he concluded on a positive note, saying,"The whole game is just a marvelous bit of fun for anyone interested in the era, the type of warfare, or just a good old-fashioned game [...] Siege of Jerusalem could be the best buy of the year."

In The Guide to Simulations/Games for Education and Training, Martin Campion called the map "Exceptionally detailed and attractive" but felt its large size "makes if a little hard to store between sessions." Commenting on its possible use as an educational aid, Campion said, "In a classroom, the command of the two sides could be easily divided into four legionary and one overall command on the Roman side,, and four factioon and one overall command on the Jewish side."

In the 1980 book The Complete Book of Wargames, game designer Jon Freeman called it "one of the finest amateur games ever published [...] a masterful job from all angles." Freeman explained, "What makes it work is that the designers have abstracted a great deal of the tedious 'wall-busting' and concentrated on the bloody assaults. Both players fight the clock as well as each other." He did note that "Some of the rules are a bit hazy, and a strong sense of organization might have helped." Nonetheless, he gave the game an Overall Evaluation of "Very Good", saying, "this is a game that was not only designed well but developed well, and it shows in the level of excitement it provides."

Charles Vasey reviewed Avalon Hill's 3rd edition for Games International magazine, and gave it a poor rating of 4 out of 10 or a very good rating of 8 out of 10, depending on if the player likes a long, complicated siege game with a lot of counters. With this in mind, Vasey asked "Who is Siege of Jerusalem for? Well, you must be able to resource a long and big game, so you need a spare room with a big table. In addition you must be very interested in the tactical side of sieges in the Ancient Period, because it is the technical side of the siege that gives the game its feel. Finally, you have to enjoy games with a very large number of operations where you serve almost as centurion rather than legate."

The Chicago Tribune said of Avalon Hill's 3rd edition that "It is designed for experienced players with a lot of time on their hands and beginners should stay away from this one. Siege of Jerusalem is, however, one of the best games available on ancient warfare. It is moderately suited for solitaire play and easily adapted for teams."

In Issue 30 of the Canadian Wargamers Journal, Keith Martens called the Avalon Hill 3rd edition "one of the most beautiful, detailed, challenging wargames ever made." But he also noted "it has some tough rules to swallow and is hard to win with the Romans. It is also very long to play (40–80 hours)."

== Awards ==
Avalon Hill's 3rd edition of the game won a Charles S. Roberts Award in the category "Best Pre-World War II Board Game of 1989", and was a finalist in the category "Best Wargaming Graphics of 1989."

== Other reviews and commentary ==
- Fire & Movement #66 & 67
- Panzerfust & Campaign #77
- Casus Belli #57
- The Wargamer Vol.2 #20
- Fire & Movement #64 & #66
