= IJN (wargame) =

1978 World War II board wargame

Cover art by Rodger B. MacGowan

IJN (Imperial Japanese Navy), subtitled "A Tactical Game of Naval and Naval-Air Combat in The Pacific, 1941–1945," is a board wargame published by Simulations Canada in 1978 that simulates various naval encounters during the Pacific Campaign of World War II. It was the first in a series of three interlocking naval wargames.

== Description ==
IJN is a two-person wargame of search followed by combat. It is played on a large featureless hex grid map where each hex represents 100 yards (91 metres), and each turn represents 90 seconds of game time.

Scenarios vary from two-ship engagements to large fleet battles. In each case either destroyers or airplanes search for enemy ships. When the enemy is located, larger ships, possibly accompanied by bomber aircraft, move in to engage in battle.

Movement of both players is simultaneous, with each player preplotting their movement for the turn, and then revealing them at the same time. The turn then takes the following sequence, all done simultaneously for both players:

1. Search
2. Gunfire
3. Ship Movement
4. Aircraft Movement and Bombing
5. Torpedo launching and movement (Torpedo movement is logged secretly until the torpedo is placed on the map when it is one hex from its target. Before it is revealed, the targeted ship has a chance to spot the incoming torpedo and take evasive action if possible.)

=== Scenarios ===
The game comes with the following scenarios:

- Battle of Balikpapan
- Battle of the Java Sea
- Battle of Sunda Strait
- Destruction of the Exeter
- Battle of Coral Sea (5 separate scenarios)
- Battle of Midway (8 separate scenarios)
- Battle of Savo Island
- Battle of Lunga Point
- Battle off Samar (a series of four hypothetical scenarios)
- Battle of Cape Esperance
- Battle of Kula Gulf
- Battle of Suriago Strait (3 separate scenarios)

Extra counters are included in the game to allow the players to design their own scenarios.

== Publication history ==
Steve Newberg designed IJN, which was published by Simulations Canada as both a ziplock bag game and as a boxed set with cover art by Rodger B. MacGowan. It was the first of three naval games designed by Newberg that used the same game system, meaning players could combine the three into one game that could be used to design scenarios for any naval engagement in any theatre of World War II. The other two games feature slightly different rule sets; Torpedo! (1979) adds rules for submarines, and Schnellboote (1984) does not have any rules for aircraft.

== Reception ==
Kirk Stroup, in Fire & Movement, thought that this game "makes one look forward to the other two [sister games] still to come, despite the fact that it has to deal with the mechanics of tactical naval simulation, a subject on which few gamers agree."

In Issue 70 of Fire & Movement, Friederich Helfferich and Joseph Miranda found the game to be a little ponderous, commenting that the rules were "fairly simple and a little broad-brush. Even so, the game is a little slow in play, requiring a good deal of bookkeeping and cross-indexing with the usual die rolls." They concluded "Designer Stephen Newberg is an old navy man. His experience shows, but even he has not found ideal solutions to the problems of tactical naval design."

Unlike some other reviewers, Dan Sichel, found the game "can be learned quickly and played fast. There is very little sitting around." Sichel did find that the 100 yd/hex scale was too granular and concluded, "IJN is not too bad a game. The scale has got to be changed however or the game is useless."

In Issue 11 of The Grenadier, Karl Wiegers looked at the three interlocking games produced by Simulations Canada (IJN, Torpedo! and Scnhellboote) and found that the identical game system used by all of them "is easy to learn, and play moves quite rapidly ... Despite some shortcomings in realism, the main attraction of the games is their high playability." However, Sayre admitted that the lack of realism could be a problem for some players, writing, "the gamer with a serious interest in WWII naval combat will only be partially satisfied ...The level of abstraction is just too great to be very rewarding, and all sorts of historically unreasonable things can happen in the course of a scenario."

Cliff Sayre also reviewed all three of Simulations Canada's naval games and felt that the designer "has done an excellent job of retaining those aspects which should be significant in a naval game and yet retained a high degree of playability and simplicity." Sayre did feel that perhaps luck was more important than skill, noting, "Luck of the die roll is a considerable factor in the games ... Winning does call for skill, but there will be times when the dice may rule." Despite this, Sayre concluded on a positive note, saying, "I have enjoyed the three games very much. The game system offers features which are not available in any other games."

In a retrospective review written almost twenty-five years after this game's publication, Joe Scoleri didn't like the highly abstracted air rules, writing, "In short, if you are an air combat gamer looking for something with a more hard-core air-naval focus, this might not be your cup of tea. But if you are a naval gamer looking for a 'does-it-all' World War II system with a different flavor than the average tactical naval game, this is worth a look."
