= MechWar '77 =

Board wargame

MechWar '77, subtitled "Tactical Armored Combat in the 1970s", is a board wargame published by Simulations Publications Inc. (SPI) in 1975 that simulates hypothetical tank combat in the mid-1970s between various adversaries, using the same rules system as the previously published Panzer '44.

== Description ==
MechWar '77 is a two-player wargame that comes with a variety of hypothetical scenarios set in the 1970s. Most of the scenarios pit NATO against the Warsaw Pact in West Germany between the east and west arms of the Main River, but one scenario is set in the Yom Kippur War, and one features a border clash between the Soviet Union and China. Players are encouraged to create their own scenarios, and for that purpose, British and West German units are included among the die-cut counters. In addition, the playing map is interchangeable with that used in Panzer '44.

=== Components ===
The "flatpack" edition includes:

- paper hex grid map scaled at 200 m (220 yd) per hex
- 400 die-cut counters
- rulebook
- sheet of charts
- one small six-sided die

In the "Designer's Edition", packaged in a larger bookshelf box, the map was mounted.

=== Gameplay ===
MechWar '77 uses the same game system as the previously published Panzer '44, the only difference being the addition of 1970s-era battle technology, including helicopters and smoke grenades. Movement uses the traditional "I Go, You Go" system of alternating turns, but once both players have moved units, combat is simultaneous.

== Publication history ==
In 1974, Jim Dunnigan developed Panzer '44, a tank combat wargame set in World War II. The previous year, Dunnigan had designed another tank combat game, Kampfpanzer, that used a simultaneous movement and combat system called "SiMove". Players and critics both found the system cumbersome because it required players to note the exact hexes every unit moved through during each turn. For Panzer '44, Dunnigan threw out the SiMove system and used a more traditional alternating movement system, but kept the simultaneous combat. The following year, Dunnigan updated Panzer 44 to a modern setting, titling the game MechWar '77. The game was released in two different packages with graphic design by Redmond A. Simonsen: SPI's traditional "flatbox" with integrated counter tray, and a "Designer's Edition" in a larger bookshelf box.

MechWar '77 proved relatively popular, debuting at No. 2 on SPI's Top Ten Bestsellers list as soon as it was released, and staying in the Top Ten for the next six months.

In 1979, Mark Herman provided many more new scenarios and an updated rules system for the sequel, MechWar 2.

== Reception ==
In the December 1975 edition of Airfix Magazine, Bruce Quarrie commented that "The game lends itself well to the creation of further scenarios by the players." He noted the simplicity of the rules system compared to other wargames of the time, saying, "The rules are kept to a minimum, consistent with some degree of realism, and regular collectors of these games will find no innovations (do we hear sighs of relief?)." Quarrie concluded, "A good game and a must for armour enthusiasts."

In a 1976 poll conducted by SPI to determine the most popular wargames in North American, MechWar '77 placed a respectable 44th out of 202 games.

In Issue 11 of the British wargaming magazine Phoenix, Mike Doe compared MechWar '77 to miniatures wargaming, and found that MechWar '77 enjoyed two major advantages: "battles are fought over a larger area, allowing more opportunity for manoeuvre, and secondly very little bookkeeping is required." However, he felt that traditional miniatures system of building units by point system was better because both opponents were unaware of what they would be facing, whereas the fixed scenarios of board wargaming meant that opponents know exactly what forces they will be facing.

In the 1977 book The Comprehensive Guide to Board Wargaming, Nicholas Palmer complimented the "Large, attractive map" and noted that "Movement is sequential but combat simultaneous, compromising between playability and realism.""

In The Guide to Simulations/Games for Education and Training, Martin Campion noted "This game is a companion to Panzer '44 — the two have nearly identical rules, the differences due mainly to the differences in weapons."

In the 1980 book The Complete Book of Wargames, game designer Jon Freeman commented, "MechWar '77 demonstrates the lethality of modern weaponry in dramatic fashion." He warned that "Tactical finesse becomes important, as direct actions tend to result in great slaughter for the impetuous." Freeman had issues with the written firing plots "and the same stupid command control rules of [SPI's Panzer '44]" Freeman gave this game an Overall Evaluation of "Good", concluding, "It can be fun for armor buffs."

In a retrospective review in Issue 13 of The Journal of 20th Century Wargaming, Marion Bates felt the simultaneous combat rules "can become rather tedious, particularly if you have quite a few units on the board, but it is far easier than detailed plotting of both movement and combat." Bates noted, "The most significant failure of the game is the absurd panic rules that pass for command control." Bates concluded, "While seriously flawed, MechWar '77 is nonetheless a creditable early effort."

== Other reviews and commentary ==
- Fire & Movement No. 15
- The Wargamer Vol.1 # 3 & No. 9
- Jagdpanther No. 10 & No. 15
- Outposts No. 7 & No. 9
- Journal of Twentieth Century Wargaming No. 13
- Pursue & Destroy Vol.1 No. 3 & Vol.3 No. 2
- Games & Puzzles #58
