= KampfPanzer: Armored Combat, 1937–40 =

Simulation war game

Cover of Strategy & Tactics No. 65, which contained the pull-out game KampfPanzer

KampfPanzer: Armored Combat, 1937–40 is a board wargame published by Simulations Publications Inc. (SPI) in 1973 that simulates the first battles involving battle tanks.

== Background ==
Tanks as armored units capable of overcoming trench warfare were first used by British forces in World War I during the Battle of Cambrai in 1917. These early machines were slow, cumbersome and prone to mechanical breakdown in the middle of no man's land. In the 1930s, many nations developed the concept of the "battle tank", a relatively rapid, mobile, well-armed and well-armored machine, usually with an artillery gun in a rotating turret. These modern tanks and the beginnings of the tactics for both using them and defending against them made appearances in various conflicts in the late 1930s.

== Description ==
KampfPanzer (German for "battle tank") is a two-player game that pits various combinations of tanks, infantry and artillery against each other during the first years of such combat.

=== Components ===
The original magazine pull-out version of the game includes:

- 22" x 34" unmounted paper hex grid map scaled at 100 m (110 yd) per hex, with generic terrain that can be adapted to all scenarios
- 10-page map-folded rules sheet
- sheet of charts and scenarios
- 200 die-cut counters
- simultaneous move sheet

The boxed edition of the game included a pad of double-sided simultaneous move sheets, and a small six-sided die.

=== Gameplay ===
Rather than the then-standard alternating "I Go, You Go" system of movement and combat found in most wargames of the time, Kampfpanzer uses SPI's first simultaneous turn system, "SiMov". Both players are required to write down the actions each unit will take for the coming turn. These moves and actions are then simultaneously revealed, and the turn occurs, representing the equivalent of 3 min 40 sec in game time. The game also has "panic" rules for units in combat; if a unit reaches a "panic" threshold, the unit moves in a random direction for a turn and does not fight.

=== Scenarios ===
The game included nine scenarios, eight of them historical, one of them hypothetical:

1. Spain, 1937: Combat during the Spanish Civil War
2. Czechoslovakia, 1938: A hypothetical encounter between a mechanized German unit and Czech defenders during the German occupation of Czechoslovakia
3. Bain-Tsagan Hill, 28 May 1939: Encounter between Russian and Japanese forces during the Russo-Japanese War
4. Poland, September 1939: Combat between German and Polish armor during the Invasion of Poland
5. Summa, 16 December 1939: Encounter between Finnish infantry and artillery and Russian tanks
6. Hannut, 13 May 1940: A clash of French and German armor during the German Blitzkrieg
7. Flavion, 16 May 1940: Another French-German combat
8. Arras, 21 May 1940: British and German armor combat
9. Abbeville, 27 May 1940: Another encounter between British and German armor.

== Publication history ==
KampfPanzer was designed by Jim Dunnigan, with graphic design by Redmond A. Simonsen, and appeared as a pull-out game in Issue No. 41 of SPI's house magazine Strategy & Tactics in 1973. SPI also released the game in a flatpack box.

The SiMov system was judged to be too cumbersome by critics and players, and SPI dropped the system immediately. The following year, Panzer '44, another tank battle game, used a blended system of alternating movement but simultaneous combat.

== Reception ==
In a poll conducted by SPI in 1976 to determine the most popular wargames in North America, Kampfpanzer placed a very poor 136th out of 202 games.

In A Player's Guide to Table Games, John Jackson noted "A decent enough effort, Kampfpanzer's biggest problem is that its scenarios and units seem inherently dull compared to the super weapons of the more 'modern' games."

In Issue 15 of Simulacrum, Joe Scoleri called the simultaneous movement system "cumbersome", and noted that the game system was quickly eclipsed by SPI's much superior Panzer '44 published the following year.

In the 1977 book The Comprehensive Guide to Board Wargaming, Nicholas Palmer noted the "controversial panic rule which randomly makes some units disobey orders." He concluded that the game was "Generally simpler but less challenging than [Avalon Hill's] Panzer Leader, except for the simultaneity of movement."

In The Playboy Winner's Guide to Board Games, game designer Jon Freeman noted that "Kampfpanzer's biggest problem, aside from order writing, is that its scenarios and units seem inherently dull compared to the super weapons of the more 'modern' games."

In Issue 65 of Fire & Movement, Jeff Petraska called it an "interesting game which is insightful and plays rather well. Its only system flaw is that there is no way for infantry to attack tanks. This is not as serious as it could be because during the time period portrayed in the game infantrymen were still figuring out how to do that."

== Other reviews and commentary ==
- Panzerfaust No. 74
- JagdPanther No. 13
- Games & Puzzles #58
