= Panzer Leader (game) =

Board game

- Designers: Jim Dunnigan
- Publishers: Avalon Hill
- Players: 2
- Setup time: 15 minutes
- Playing time: 45–180 minutes
- Chance: Medium
- Age range: 10 and up
- Skills: Strategic thought

Panzer Leader, published in 1974, is the sequel to Avalon Hill's 1970's PanzerBlitz tactical board-wargame.

== Gameplay ==
Like its predecessor, it is a tactical platoon level hex and counter board wargame depicting World War II tank and infantry combat on the Western European front. It features 4 geomorphic map tiles, which can be put together in a variety of ways to play the provided scenarios (which are printed on cardstock, showing all the necessary information for a scenario) or home-made scenarios. The 20 provided scenarios cover various battles on the Western Front, with most of the scenarios involving the Normandy campaign or the Battle of the Bulge. Two scenarios cover the amphibious assaults on Omaha and Gold beaches and include special rules for naval fire. While based on PanzerBlitz, the rules were cleaned up and included additional mechanics such as for air attacks and engineers, as well new spotting rules to prevent "PanzerBush" tactics - units could no longer fire from concealment without revealing themselves to enemies. Several optional and experimental rules are provided, including one for opportunity fire to further nullify PanzerBush maneuvers.

The Panzer Leader map boards are interchangeable with the PanzerBlitz maps, and one could combine the two sets to make a larger battlefield. The scale is the same with the two games. The German units are interchangeable, and if one wanted, players can try a "what if" scenario with American/British forces vs. Soviet forces.

An extension kit covering the tanks of 1940 was also published. This is for the France 1940 campaign, and is meant for play with the Panzer Leader game.

== Anticipation ==
PanzerBlitz is considered to be revolutionary in the history of tactical war-games and brought many new players into the hobby. When it was released in 1970, the few war-games available for purchase were generally larger scale strategic war-games that did not delve into the same kind of unit detail.

Beyond merely coming up with additional scenarios for the existing PanzerBlitz game, the idea of a new game featuring the Western Front was an obvious one and the merits of different approaches were debated outside of Avalon Hill during the early 1970s. As an example of this fervor, a proposal in Panzerfaust No. 51 inspired three different articles in response in No. 53.

In their time, PanzerBlitz and Panzer Leader were very popular among the war gamer crowd, but their popularity fell away to what is considered the next generation of tactical World War II games of Squad Leader and Advanced Squad Leader.

== Reception ==
In his 1977 book The Comprehensive Guide to Board Wargaming, Nicholas Palmer called the dots in the middle of map hexes (to calculate line of sight) "useful." However, he noted "The opportunity fire rule, while more realistic, has a slight tendency to keep units' heads down in cover, so the game is not quite as fluid as [previously published Avalon Hill game] PanzerBlitz." Comparing Panzer Leader and PanzerBlitz, Palmer said, "both games are excellent, and preference is largely a matter of taste."

In the 1980 book The Complete Book of Wargames, game designer Jon Freeman noted that "Panzer Leader follows in the footsteps of PanzerBlitz, but with four years' worth of improvements and additions." He also commented on another difference: "While units individually don't have quite the interest of some employed on the eastern front (in PanzerBlitz), there's a bit more variety overall and a bit more realism in this western-front version." Freeman concluded by giving the game an Overall Evaluation of "Very Good".

In The Guide to Simulations/Games for Education and Training, Martin Campion commented, "The rules show several improvements over those of PanzerBlitz, but are basically the same."

== Other reviews and commentary ==
- Panzerfaust #66
- Panzerfaust and Campaign #72, #76, & #77
- Campaign #83
- Fire & Movement #4
- Variant Vol.1 #4
- Moves #24, p13-14
- Games & Puzzles #58
