= Panzer '44: Tactical Combat in Western Europe, 1944–45 =

Board wargame

Panzer '44: Tactical Combat in Western Europe, 1944–45 is a board wargame published by Simulations Publications Inc. (SPI) in 1975 that simulates historical tank combat during World War II.

== Description ==
Panzer '44 is a two-player board wargame where one player controls German forces, and the other Allied forces. With rules for plotted fire, and different types of artillery fire, including direct fire, defensive opportunity fire, and indirect fire, all of which use various types of ammunition, as well as close air support, minefields and entrenchments, this game has been characterized as "complicated."

Combat is tactical at platoon level, with map hexes scaled at only 200 m (220 yd), and each turn representing 6 minutes of game time. The counters represent 27 types of German units, 24 types of American units and seven kinds of British units. As critic Jon Freeman noted, this is a game where armor units are predominant, and infantry are "offensively useless." Critic Geoff Barbard agreed, saying "the infantry plod along at 1 hex per turn and play a very subordinate role."

=== Gameplay ===
Both players simultaneously plot their fire for the turn, then reveal which of their units are going to move. Units are then moved before all firing happens simultaneously. The game system is the same used in SPI's MechWar '77 wargame set in the 1970s.

=== Scenarios ===
The game comes with fourteen scenarios, all of them based on actual battles that happened from June 1944 to March 1945.

== Publication history ==
In 1975, Jim Dunnigan designed two tank combat games that used the same game system, Panzer '44 and MechWar '77. SPI released Panzer '44 first, in March 1975, and it proved popular, immediately opening at #6 on SPI's Top Ten Bestseller List, then rising to #5 two months later. MechWar '77 was released two months after Panzer '44, in May 1975, and proved even more popular.

== Reception ==
In a 1976 poll conducted by SPI to determine the most popular board wargames in North America, Panzer '44 was rated very highly, placing 33rd out of 202 games.

In Issue 10 of JagdPanther, game designer Stephen V. Cole called "the twin games of Panzer '44 and MechWar '77 a pretty decent simulation." He noted that because the two games use the same game system, it was possible to combine the two and throw World War II tanks against modern (1970s) tanks. However, he noted that 1970s armor was capable of withstanding World War II firepower, and suggested, just for fun, that tanks from Panzer '44 be given 3 points of extra firepower to at least make them competitive. He then suggested two science-fiction scenarios in which World War II tanks find themselves time-warped into the 1970s to face modern opponents, calling both scenarios "hokey but enjoyable." In the same issue, Howard Anderson liked the game, calling it "the best simulation of these types of actions you are likely to find." However, he noted that with the game's unwieldy quasi-simultaneous move and fire system, it was impossible to control very many counters. Anderson proposed moving to a more traditional "I Go, You Go" sequential turn system, saying "you are throwing away quite a bit of the accuracy, but the game is a lot more fun with faster action and more units."

In the 1980 book The Complete Book of Wargames, game designer Jon Freeman thought the game system was very complex and the command control rules "absurd", saying "they cannot be justified on the grounds of either realism or playability." Despite this, he concluded by giving the game an Overall Evaluation of "Good," saying "Panzer '44 isn't a bad game and when published it represented something of an advance in the state of the art of tactical armor simulations."

In Issue 21 of the UK wargaming magazine Phoenix, Geoff Barnard looked at developments in armor combat simulations, and complimented Panzer '44's artillery rules as a positive step forward, saying that they "add further to the detail of the artillery rules by putting the artillery effect at the very end of the turn, after all movement and book-keeping." However, he noted the issues with infantry, saying, the game has "a mere subsidiary role for the infantry: as the tanks and vehicles zoom about, the infantry move at one hex per turn, generally the fire system leaves them very exposed to being wiped out by a tank with nothing better to fire at!" He concluded that Panzer '44 was "not too bad at representing tank vs tank combat, and mobile warfare but not really tactical simulations and, not doing a very good job on the infantry side."

== Other reviews and commentary ==
- Fire & Movement #65
- Panzerfaust #77
- Campaign #85
- Ann Arbor Wargamer #17
