= Canadian Civil War =

Canadian Civil War may refer to:

- Canada and the American Civil War the events in the colonies of British North America during the U.S. civil war (1861–65).
- The rebellions of 1837–1838, two armed uprisings in what are now Quebec and Ontario
- Canadian Civil War (game), a 1977 board game that simulates a hypothetical break-up of Canada

== See also ==
- Riel Rebellion (disambiguation), two uprisings led by Louis Riel 1869 and 1885, in what are now Manitoba and Saskatchewan
