= 1918 (disambiguation) =

1918 is a year in the Gregorian calendar.

1918 may also refer to:

- 1918 (number)
- 1918 (1957 film), a Finnish war film
- 1918 (1985 film), an American drama film
- 1918 (wargame), a board wargame published by SPI in 1970
