= The Next War =

The Next War may refer to:

- The Next War (board game), 1978 board wargame
- "The Next War" (poem), 1917 poem by Wilfred Owen
