= Flying Fortress I & II =

1969 WWII board wargame

Cover of the rulebook, 1969

Flying Fortress I and Flying Fortress II are different versions of the same board wargame published by Poultron Press in 1969 that simulates the American bombing campaign over Europe during World War II. The games were part of a test series in which the better version was to be republished under the name Luftwaffe; however, that game was never released.

== Description ==
Both Flying Fortress I and Flying Fortress II are two-player board wargames where one player controls American bombers and fighters and the other player controls German fighters and city air defenses.

=== Gameplay ===
The players can choose to play a single mission, or a campaign game, which links several missions together. Both the mission game and the campaign game come with Basic rules as well as optional Variable Orders of Battle, and a set of optional rules.

In addition, the game includes a Beginner's Game, meant to introduce new players to the hobby of wargaming.

Each bomber counter represents 100 bombers — either Boeing B-17G Flying Fortresses or Consolidated B-24J Liberators — and each fighter counter represents 50 fighters.

The game starts when the American bombers take off from England and fly over the hex grid map towards German targets. The German player, who chooses before the game where to station airbases and flak guns, attempts to eliminate bombers. Another possible combat result in the first version of the game is to disperse the bomber group, which forces the American player miss a turn while the bombers regroup. The American player tries to protect the bombers with escort fighters, and tries to drop bombs on strategic targets to gain victory points.

Each missions lasts about 12 turns.

=== Flying Fortress II ===
The second version of the game removes "dispersal" from the Combat Results Table and adds "step reduction" — a unit takes two hits before it is destroyed. The counters are printed on the front with the undamaged unit and on the back showing the damaged unit. When a unit is damaged, the counter is flipped over. When the unit is damaged a second time, the unit is removed from the board. The game also provides new aircraft types

== Publication history ==
In 1969, Avalon Hill dominated the wargame market, producing on average, one game per year with well-produced but expensive components. At the new wargame publisher Poultron Press — soon to become Simulations Publications Inc. — co-founder Jim Dunnigan and his design team decided to go in the opposite direction, marketing a number of very cheaply made "Test Series" games to see if producing many games a year could also be a viable business model. These test games featured typewritten pages with hand-drawn maps and graphics and thin paper counter sheets, packaged in a plain manila envelope. The second of these games was Flying Fortress I. This was followed later in 1969 by the tenth Test Series game, Flying Fortress II. Dunnigan was planning to produce a boxed game called Luftwaffe in 1971, and released the two Flying Fortress games to try to decide which version would become the new Luftwaffe. (A third game, B-17, was also going to be considered for Luftwaffe, but was never produced.) In the end, Luftwaffe was never published.

== Reception ==
In Issue 16 of Albion, British critic Don Turnbull liked the rules of Flying Fortress I, commenting, "We have come to expect excellent play mechanics from the Test Series games, and this one is no exception [...] Action is swift, interesting and thought-provoking. German fighters struggle to knock the powerful Allied bombers out of the sky before they can drop their bombs, or to delay them in reaching their target by dispersing the group and forcing the Allied player to spend precious time in reforming." Turnbull also liked the short missions, which he found could be completed in about 90 minutes, saying, "Two or three missions can be played per evening, yet natural breaks occur at frequent intervals, and the game can be shelved at almost a moment's notice, with little expenditure of energy in re-setting up the game next time." The only issues Turnbull had with the game were the lack of variety of bombers, and the Combat Results Table, which Turnbull felt was "too harsh by far. Whole wings of aircraft fall out of the sky after attacks at low battle odds, and the French and German countryside is littered with broken planes." Despite this, Turnbull concluded on a positive note, saying, "Certainly a good deal of enjoyment can be had from FFI."

In Issue 19 of Albion, Don Turnbull compared Flying Fortress II to its predecessor, and found it difficult to recommend one version over the other. The only issue he had with the second version was the German fighter production rules, which he found ambiguous. Turnbull concluded, "Both games are highly recommended. Please clean up the production rules in FFII, but otherwise don't touch a thing."

In a retrospective review of Flying Fortress I in Issue 33 of Simulacrum, John Kula noted the primitive production quality: "The components constituting FF were the usual Test Series quality ... everything photocopied on 8½”x 11” sheets except possibly the main map which was bed sheet size. The counters were photocopied in colour, but not cut. The tables and charts were sometimes photocopied on coloured paper and sometimes not. And it all came in a plain brown manila envelope." With the benefit of hindsight 45 years after the game had been published, Kula pointed out, "The target systems presented in the game were based on information allegedly developed by the US on the efficacy of bombing various targets. The initial data were apparently incorrect, and it was later determined that bombing certain targets that were thought to be essential in fact did little to slow Germany’s war economy, whereas other targets that were ignored or treated as secondary were in fact vital to Germany’s efforts.
