= Normandy: The Invasion of Europe 1944 =

Board wargame

- Cover of 2nd edition, 1971
- Designers: Jim Dunnigan
- Illustrators: Redmond A. Simonsen
- Publishers: Simulations Publications Inc. (SPI)
- Publication: 1969; 56 years ago
- Genres: Board wargame
- Players: 2
- Playing time: 3-4 hours

Normandy: The Invasion of Europe 1944 is a board wargame published by Simulations Publications Inc. (SPI) in 1969 that simulates the D-Day landings on the beaches of Normandy, and the six days that followed as the German forces tried to prevent an Allied break-out. A second revised edition was published in 1971

== Background ==
On June 6, 1944, the Allies opened a western front during World War II by landing an invasion force on the beaches of Normandy. Although Allied forces fought their way off the beaches by the end of the first day, German reserves counterattacked fiercely, trying to pin the Allies against the beaches and then force them back into the sea.

== Description ==
Normandy is a two-player wargame in which one player controls Allied landing forces, and the other controls the Germans. Rules cover naval artillery support, airborne troops, commandos and supply. Although relatively complex, with 255 counters and a large hex grid map, the game only lasts only a few turns (seven in the 1st edition, six in the 2nd edition), each turn representing one day of battle.

Although there is only one scenario, the German defense has several possible orders of battle, from the actual historical defense to "what if?" orders of battle such as the defense envisioned by Erwin Rommel. (In the 1st edition, only three orders of battle were available; the 2nd edition increased this to six.) The German order of battle is chosen at random by the German player, who does not reveal the result to the Allied player. Some of the German units start facedown, making it even more difficult for the Allied player to determine the German's disposition.

== Publication history ==
In the mid-1960s, Jim Dunnigan had designed some games for Avalon Hill, but questioned the company's sales model, which was based on marketing only one or two expensive games every year. Dunnigan started up Poultron Press in 1969 with the idea of marketing a lot of cheap games every year. To test this idea, Dunnigan produced a series of test games packaged in plain manila envelopes and using the cheapest components: cardstock counters, hand-drawn paper maps and mimeographed sheets of rules. One of the games in this Test Series was Normandy, published in 1969. The game proved popular enough that Dunnigan revised the rules and published a second edition in 1971 as a boxed set with upgraded components and graphic design by Redmond A. Simonsen. The company name had, by this time, been changed to Simulations Publications. The 2nd edition with different cover art was published in the UK the same year.

== Reception ==
In a 1976 poll conducted by SPI to determine the most popular board wargames in North America, Normandy, seven years old at that point, did not attract much attention, and was only rated 128th out of 202 games.

In Issue 11 of Albion, game designer Don Turnbull reviewed the original 1969 Test Series edition, and called the overall production quality "below average", complaining about the thin counters, especially "the careless way in which they have been cut from the main sheet. The poor bloke who does this obviously gets rather fed up of cutting out counters all day, and seems incapable of cutting anything approaching a square. It strikes me they have put the company moron on this job. The result is untidy stacking and often difficulty in deciphering the combat factors etc. Totally displeasing to the eye." However, he found the rules "quite easy to read and sort out. It only took us about 20 minutes to set up for the first game. [...] On the whole I would rate them highly for clarity and comprehension." Turnbull found the gameplay "Very good indeed. Although the basic rules are far from the complexity of [Avalon Hill's game] 1914 etc., much thought is required in play." The one improvement Turnbull suggested for gameplay was to have a separate Combat Results Table (CRT) for combat on the beaches rather than the same one for the entire game, since "At present it seems rather easy to get ashore." Turnbull found the game well-balanced between complexity and playability, saying, "This could be the most complex game ever if the designer had wanted it that way. It would have probably been unplayable in those conditions. We think a nice balance has been obtained." Turnbull concluded, "Play excellent. [...] Well worth getting, if you don't mind paying a bit extra for the physical side than you should do, being compensated by good play."

In Issue 7 of Moves, Martin Campion called the 1st edition "one of the more disappointing of the old first generation Poultron Press games" but found the 2nd edition "thoroughly professionalized in its format and it solves all the annoying problems with the rules that made the first edition so frustrating." Campion concluded, "The game is fast moving and a little more suspenseful than most."

Writing for The Pouch, Nicholas Ulanov thought the game was "Interestingly done, but it's unrealistic and the Germans can never win." Ulanov concluded by giving the game a rating of only 2 out of 4.

In the 1977 book The Comprehensive Guide to Board Wargaming, Nick Palmer reviewed the second edition and listed the various complexities of the game and its numerous counters, but admitted "plenty of units but a mere six turns, so playable in 3–4 hours." For a more up-to-date game, he suggested Overlord designed by John Hill, or for a more strategic simulation of the entire six-month campaign from Normandy to the German border, D-Day by Avalon Hill.

== Other reviews and commentary ==
- The Wargamer Vol.1 #3
- Fire & Movement #65
- Panzerfaust #5
- Spartan Simulation Gaming Journal #2
- Phoenix #10
