= Jim Dunnigan =

American writer (born 1943)

James F. Dunnigan
- Born: August 8, 1943 (age 82); Rockland County, New York, United States
- Education: Columbia University (BA)
- Occupations: Author, military analyst, wargame designer
- Known for: Founder, Simulations Publications Inc. (SPI); PanzerBlitz; How To Make War

James F. Dunnigan (born August 8, 1943) is an author, military-political analyst, Defense and State Department consultant, and wargame designer currently living in New York City.

== Career ==
Dunnigan was born in Rockland County, New York. After high school, he volunteered for the military instead of waiting to be drafted. From 1961 to 1964, he worked as a repair technician for the Sergeant ballistic missile; his service included a tour in Korea. Afterwards, he attended Pace University studying accounting, then transferred to Columbia University, graduating with a degree in history in 1970.

In college he became involved in wargaming. He designed Jutland, which Avalon Hill published in 1967, following it up with 1914 the next year, and PanzerBlitz in 1970, which eventually sold more than 300,000 copies. Meanwhile, Dunnigan had founded his own company, initially known as Poultron Press, and which was soon renamed to Simulations Publications Inc. (SPI). Dunnigan created SPI to save the magazine Strategy & Tactics, which at that time was published by Chris Wagner. Dunnigan had been contributing material to the magazine since its second issue in February 1967, and when Wagner was having financial challenges with the magazine he sold the rights to Dunningan for $1. Dunnigan took over a windowless basement on the Lower East Side of Manhattan where he published his first issue, Strategy & Tactics #18 in September 1969; every issue included a new wargame beginning with that issue. Dunnigan also designed the game Sniper! (1973). Dunnigan later designed Dallas: The Television Role-Playing Game (1980), which was the first published licensed role-playing game. In 1980, Dunnigan was forced to leave SPI as the financial situation at the company was deteriorating. He left SPI to write more books, begin modeling financial markets, and pursue other projects.

Between 1966 and 1992, he designed over 100 wargames and other conflict simulations, ranging from 1969's Up Against the Wall, Motherfucker about the student takeover at Columbia (which he witnessed as a bystander (Note: According to Dunnigan he was a student at Columbia University that season and, although he has not participated in the action, several of his friends did. Some of these worked in the school newspaper and asked Dunnigan to make a game for the first anniversary of The Spectator. Quoted in Dunnigan, James F (2000). "Appendix". Wargames Handbook (3rd ed.). New York: Writers Club Press. p. 405. ISBN 0-595-15546-4.)), to the gigantic War in Europe, to the online Hundred Years War with his long-time partners Albert Nofi and Daniel Masterson, which has been running since 1992.

In 1979, he wrote The Complete Wargames Handbook (first edition), and in 1980 How to Make War.

Dunnigan contributed to Three-Sixty Pacific's Victory at Sea but, he claimed, was not allowed to finish the computer wargame's design, although it was advertised as "James F. Dunnigan's Victory at Sea".

With his partners from the Hundred Years War, Daniel Masterson and Albert Nofi, Dunnigan founded the online military news site StrategyPage in 1999, of which he is the editor-in-chief. Podcasts of his commentaries on history, military affairs, and the contemporary world are regularly posted on StrategyPage.Com and as at Instapundit.com

Dunnigan regularly lectures at military and academic institutions, such as the Chief of Naval Operations Strategic Studies Group, in Newport, Rhode Island.

== Awards/recognition ==
At Origins in 1976, Dunnigan was inducted into the Charles Roberts Awards Hall of Fame. In 1999 Pyramid magazine named him as one of the millennium's most influential persons "at least in the realm of adventure gaming". He was honored as a "famous game designer" by being featured on the king of diamonds in Flying Buffalo's 2008 Famous Game Designers Playing Card Deck.

== Books ==
- The Complete Wargames Handbook, first edition, 1979
  - The Complete Wargames Handbook: How to Play, Design and Find Them, Revised edition, William Morrow, 1992. ISBN 0-688-10368-5. (online version)
  - Wargames Handbook: How to Play and Design Commercial and Professional Wargames, Third edition, 2000. ISBN 0595155464.
- How To Make War: A Comprehensive Guide To Modern Warfare, first edition, 1983
  - How to Make War: A Comprehensive Guide to Modern Warfare for the Post-Cold War Era, 3rd edition, William Morrow, 1993. ISBN 0-688-12157-8.
  - How to Make War: A Comprehensive Guide to Modern Warfare in the Twenty-first Century, 4th edition, HarperCollins, 2003.
- Digital Soldiers, St. Martin's, 1996. ISBN 0-312-14588-8.
- Dirty Little Secrets of the 20th Century: Myths, Misinformation, and Unknown Truths About the 20th Century, William Morrow, 1999. ISBN 0-688-17068-4.
- The Perfect Soldier. Citadel, 2004. ISBN 0-8065-2416-2.

=== Co-author ===
As editor and co-author
- The Russian Front: Germany's War in the East, 1941-45 (also published as The Russian Campaign), Arms and Armour, 1978. ISBN 0-85368-152-X.
With William Martel
- How to Stop a War: The Lessons of Two Hundred Years of War and Peace, Doubleday, 1987. ISBN 0-385-24009-0.
With Austin Bay
- From Shield to Storm: High-Tech Weapons, Military Strategy and Coalition Warfare in the Persian Gulf, William Morrow, 1991. ISBN 0-688-11034-7.
- A Quick & Dirty Guide to War: Briefings on Present and Potential Wars, 4th edition, Paladin, 2008. ISBN 978-1-58160-683-6.
With Albert Nofi
- Shooting Blanks: War Making That Doesn't Work, 1991. ISBN 0-688-08947-X.
- Medieval Life and the Hundred Years War (200,000 word online book, 1994)
- Dirty Little Secrets of World War II: Military Information No One Told You About the Greatest, Most Terrible War in History, William Morrow, 1994. ISBN 0-688-12235-3.
- Victory at Sea: World War II in the Pacific, William Morrow, 1995. ISBN 0-688-14947-2.
- The Pacific War Encyclopedia, Facts on File, 1998. ISBN 0-8160-3439-7.
- Dirty Little Secrets: American Military Information You're Not Supposed to Know, St. Martins Press, 1999. ISBN 0-312-19857-4.
- Victory and Deceit: Deception and Trickery at War, 2nd edition, Writers Club, 2001. ISBN 0-595-18405-7.
- Dirty Little Secrets of the Vietnam War: Military Information You're Not Supposed to Know, St. Martins Griffin, 2001. ISBN 0-312-25282-X.
With Daniel Masterson
- The Way of the Warrior: Business Tactics and Techniques from History's Twelve Greatest Generals, St. Martin's Griffin, 1998. ISBN 0-312-19535-4.
With Raymond M. Macedonia
- Getting It Right: American Military Reforms After Vietnam to the Gulf War and Beyond, 2nd edition, Writers Club, 2001. ISBN 0-595-18446-4.

=== Other works ===
- (contributor) Wargame Design: The History, Production, and Use of Conflict Simulations, Simulations Publications, 1977. ISBN 0-917852-01-X.
- Foreword to H.G. Wells's Floor Games (Skirmisher, 2006)

== Games ==
- Jutland (1967)
- 1914 (1968)
- 1918 (1969)
- Anzio Beachhead (1969)
- Barbarossa (1969)
- Crete (1969)
- Deployment (1969)
- Flying Fortress (1969)
- Italy (1969)
- Korea (1969)
- Leipzig (1969)
- Normandy (1969)
- Tannenberg (1969)
- Up Against the Wall, Motherfucker (1969)
- Bastogne (1970)
- Chicago, Chicago! (1970)
- PanzerBlitz (1970)
- Grenadier (1971)
- Kursk (1971)
- Lost Battles (1971)
- Origins of World War II (1971)
- Strategy I (1971)
- USN (1971)
- The Next President (1971)
- American Revolution (1972)
- Breakout and Pursuit (1972)
- Combat Command (1972)
- Flying Circus (1972)
- France '40 (1972)
- Franco-Prussian War (1972)
- Moscow Campaign (1972)
- Origins of World War I (1972)
- Outdoor Survival (1972)
- Red Star/White Star (1972)
- Turning Point (1972)
- Wilderness Campaign (1972)
- Year of the Rat (1972)
- Ardennes Offensive (1973)
- Battles of Bull Run (1973)
- CA (1973)
- Desert War (1973)
- El Alamein (1973)
- Foxbat & Phantom (1973)
- Kampfpanzer (1973)
- NATO (1973)
- Napoleon at Waterloo (1973)
- Panzer Armee Afrika (1973)
- Scrimmage (1973)
- Sinai (1973)
- Sniper! (1973)
- Solomons Campaign (1973)
- Spitfire (1973)
- World War Two (1973)
- American Civil War (1974)
- Combined Arms (1974)
- Frigate (1974)
- Operation Olympic (1974)
- Patrol (1974)
- Tank (1974)
- The East is Red (1974)
- War in the East (1974)
- Wolfpack (1974)
- Battle for Germany (1975)
- Global War (1975)
- Invasion America (1975)
- Mech War '77 (1975)
- Oil War (1975)
- Panzer '44 (1975)
- Sixth Fleet (1975)
- The Fast Carriers (1975)
- War in the Pacific (1975)
- World War 3 (1975)
- World War I (1975)
- Wurzburg (1975)
- FireFight (1976)
- Panzergruppe Guderian (1976)
- Plot to Assassinate Hitler (1976)
- Minuteman: The Second American Revolution (1976)
- Revolt in the East (1976)
- Russian Civil War (1976)
- Strike Force (1976)
- War in Europe (1976)
- War in the West (1976)
- Fulda Gap (1977)
- Agincourt (1978)
- Brusilov (1978)
- Canadian Civil War (1978)
- The Next War (1978)
- Bulge (1979)
- Berlin '85 (1980)
- Dallas (1980)
- Demons (1980)
- Drive on Metz (1980)
- Empires of the Middle Ages (1980)
- Fifth Corps (1980)
- NATO Division Commander (1980)
- TimeTripper (1980)
- Wreck of the Pandora (1980)
- Light Infantry Division (1985)
- Tactical Combat Model (1985)
- Men-At-Arms (1990)
- Hundred Years War (1992)
- Victory at Sea (1992)
