= Sinai: The Arab-Israeli Wars =

1973 Middle East board wargame

Sinai: The Arab-Israeli Wars – '56, '67 and '73 is a board wargame published by Simulations Publications Inc. (SPI) in 1973 that simulates three conflicts in the Middle East: The 1956 Suez Crisis, the 1967 Six-Day War, and the just-completed 1973 Yom Kippur War. The staff of SPI had been developing a wargame simulating a hypothetical Middle East conflict when war broke out in October 1973. Using newspaper and television reports, SPI found that their envisioned simulation was not accurate, and quickly redeveloped the game, releasing it only weeks after a ceasefire had been signed. The game proved very popular, and remained a best-seller for SPI during the 1970s.

== Description ==
Sinai is a two-player board wargame where one player controls Israeli forces and the other player controls Arab forces, which can include Egyptian, Jordanian, Syrian, and Russian units. The game provides three historical scenarios:

- 1956: Suez Crisis
- 1967: Six-Day War
- 1973: Yom Kippur War

In addition, the game includes a hypothetical conflict in the mid-1970s, and several "what if?" scenarios for each of the three historical conflicts.

=== Gameplay ===
With only 225 counters and a 22" x 34" hex grid map scaled at 12 km (7.5 mi) per hex, Sinai is not complex and has been characterized as a game of "fast-moving simplicity." For the 1956 and 1967 scenarios, the game uses a traditional "I Go, You Go" alternating system of turns, where one player moves and attacks, followed by the other player. This simulates 12 hours of combat.

In the 1973 and hypothetical mid-1970s scenarios, each game turn includes two movement phases and two attack phases for each player, and each game turn represents 24 hours of the battle.

The rules for the 1956 and 1967 games, characterized by Ian Chadwick as "straightforward", cover supply, overrun, Jordanian participation, Arab command control, trucks, airstrikes, and fortified settlements. Rules for surface to air missiles (SAMs), the Bar Lev line, Israeli garrisons, Egyptian reserves, and ceasefires, are added for the 1973 and mid-1970s games.

=== Victory conditions ===
In the 1956 and 1967 scenarios, the Israelis will defeat the Arabs quite handily, but must achieve a number of victory conditions in order to "win" the game.

In the 1973 and hypothetical mid-1970 scenarios, the game is more balanced, and victory conditions depend on geographical gains made by both sides.

== Publication history ==
In 1973, Jim Dunnigan and his SPI staff were in the midst of developing a wargame that simulated the Suez Crisis, the Six-Day War and a hypothetical war in the 1970s when the Yom Kippur War began, making their hypothetical game a historical reality. As critic Martin Campion noted, "Immediately they began watching television and reading newspapers and redesigning the game on a day-to-day basis. Finally after the cease fire they finished the game with three instead of two historical scenarios." Marcus Watney commented "Hurriedly comparing their own projection of a future war with the real thing, SPI found that their 'tomorrow' bore little resemblance to the real events. Specifically, the significance of the Egyptian missile defences had been missed, and the Egyptian capability vastly underrated. The 'tomorrow' scenario was improved and became the 1973 scenario, and a new 'tomorrow' scenario was designed from scratch."

The finished product, with graphic design by Redmond A. Simonsen, was marketed only weeks after the cease fire.

Critic Bruce Quarries predicted that because of Sinai's topicality, "this game will probably became one of SPI's most popular." Quarrie was correct — Sinai proved to have a long-lasting popularity. Two years after its release, the game was still on SPI's Top Ten Bestseller List. In a 1976 poll conducted by SPI to determine the most popular board wargames in North America, the three-year-old game was rated 15th out of 202 games, the oldest game in the top twenty. Five years after its publication, Vic Baker called Sinai one of SPI's "three best-sellers to date". (The other two were Star Force and World War 3.)

== Reception ==
In the August 1974 issue of Airfix Magazine, Bruce Quarrie called Sinai "Good fun, good value for money, and some interesting tactical problems emerge which give one some insight into the problems of Middle Eastern warfare today.

In his 1977 book The Comprehensive Guide to Board Wargaming, Nicky Palmer called Sinai "a fine operational-level simulation." Palmer noted that "Israel wins the first two wars comfortably (the game victory depending on the level of Israeli success), but in 1973, the better Arab training and SAM missiles make it very much an even struggle with a fascinating choice of strategies for the Israeli player in particular." In his 1980 sequel, The Best of Board Wargaming , Palmer added "Somewhat abstract in the simulation of air/SAM combat, but convincing and exciting in the land campaign." Palmer concluded by giving the game an "Excitement Grade" of 80%.

In The Guide to Simulations/Games for Education and Training, Martin Campion found that "Trying to fit the game to three different wars has resulted in many awkward rule switches." Campion also thought that the air rules "are uncomfortably abstract."

In Issue 55 of Moves, Ian Chadwick found the 1956 and 1967 scenarios "to be blunt, a pushover for the Israelis." In addition, Chadwick found the 1956 scenario "neither a good game nor a good historical simulation. It oversimplifies the situations, ignores too many possibilities, and gives the Israeli player a guaranteed victory." Chadwick also found the 1967 scenario unbalanced, but "Nonetheless, the game is playable and entertaining." Finally Chadwick called the 1973 and hypothetical mid-1970s scenarios "mobile, desperate, and yet simple enough to be fun and playable in one sitting." Overall, Chadwick concluded that Sinai "would benefit from some retouching and the inclusion of a 1948 scenario, but it stands as one of SPI's best efforts to date."

== Other reviews and commentary ==
- Strategy & Tactics #54
- Fire & Movement #145
- The Wargamer Vol.1 #2
- Outpost #5
- Panzerfaust #66
- International Confederation of Wargamers #34
- American Wargamer Vol.4 #6, 7 & 8
