= NATO Division Commander =

Board wargame published by Simulations Publications Inc. in 1980

NATO Division Commander, subtitled "Leadership Under Fire", is a board wargame published by Simulations Publications Inc. (SPI) in 1980 that simulates hypothetical World War III ground combat scenarios in Europe between NATO and Warsaw Pact forces using armaments of the 1970s.

== Description ==
NATO Division Commander is a 2-player board wargame in which one player controls the invading forces of the Warsaw Pact, and the other player controls the NATO defensive forces. The game scenarios posit that the Warsaw Pact has already penetrated into the West Germany countryside; the setting is the Fulda Gap north of Frankfurt.

=== Components ===
The game box contains:

- two identical 22" x 35" paper hex grid maps scaled at 1 mi (1.6 km) per hex
- two identical sets of 600 counters each
- 25-page rule book (contains opening scenario)
- 8-page booklet of 30 game charts and tables
- 15-page Scenario book with Designer's and Playtesters' Notes
- 8-page booklet of charts required for scenarios
- 11-page essay, "NATO Division Commander: Command and Control in the Modern Battlefield Environment" by Stephen B. Patrick

=== Gameplay ===
Each game turn represents 8 hours. In addition to an introductory scenario included with the rules as an introduction to the basic game, the game includes a booklet of eight more scenarios of increasing complexity, with instructions for how to design more scenarios. Unlike most other wargames of the time that have some form of "all units move, then all units shoot", NATO Division Commander uses a system similar to SPI's larger game The Next War, where one unit moves at a time, combat and other activities being a function of movement.

The game can be played in two different modes:

- Competition Game: A conventional wargame played on a single map, where two competitors can see all of their opponent's units.
- Controller Game: Similar to military wargame training exercises, one player deploys NATO forces on one of the maps, but cannot "see" any opponents. A second person, the Controller, places both the player's NATO forces and the Warsaw Pact forces on a second (identical) map that is not visible to the NATO player. As the NATO player moves units, the Controller moves the Warsaw Pact forces in accordance with pre-programmed reactions, and gives the NATO player information and intelligence gained as the NATO player moves. As the NATO player makes contact with opposing units, they appear on the NATO map.

Regardless of which game system is used, each game turn takes the following sequence:

1. Weather Determination and Intelligence Allocation
2. First player
  1. Intelligence gathering
  2. Asset transfers
  3. Mode Change/Forced March Designation
  4. Offensive Counter-Battery Fire
  5. Defensive Counter-Battery Fire
  6. Movement and Combat
  7. Housekeeping
3. Second player
  1. Repeats all phases of Step 2
4. Game Turn Marker Advance

== Publication history ==
In the December 1977 issue of SPI's house magazine Strategy & Tactics, a reader suggested that NATO Division Commander be developed as a "player versus controller" simulation. Game designer Jim Dunnigan reported in S&T #68 (June 1978) that the game was indeed being developed as a Controller game. However, later reports indicated that a standard two-player Competition game was also developed for the game. Game development took longer than expected, and several tentative release dates were pushed back until the game finally appeared in March 1980, featuring graphic design by Redmond A. Simonsen.

The game appeared at #8 on SPI's Top Ten Bestseller list, and stayed on the Top Ten list for four months after its release.

After the demise of SPI, Chinese game company Aurora Game Studio acquired the rights to the game and published a Chinese version (北约师指挥官) in 2021.

== Reception ==
In Issue 32 of Phoenix, Donald Mack pointed out that several charts and tracks referred to in the rules did not exist, saying that the game, "having been delayed time and time again, was finally rushed out without as complete a set of graphic playing-aids as had been intended." He also noted that "The rules, I am afraid, also bear the indications of a hurried finishing-off. They are generally complete but in some important instances there are very vague explanations and concepts." Mack was not impressed with the Competition Mode game, calling it "a book-keeping, dice-rolling, counter-stacking, balls-aching ordeal, each turn likely to last for two hours [...] it's rather a lot of drudgery." However, Mack enjoyed the Controller game, and felt that this is what the game had been developed to do, saying, "the whole feel of a game changes dramatically for the better." He concluded "NDC certainly lacks the feel of mechanised warfare, strong though it is on planning. Its appeal lies, I consider, in the opportunity it gives the Player to venture on to the hostile emptiness of the map and see what is 'at the other side of the hill'."

In Issue 26 of Fire & Movement, Bill Sanders also thought that this game was not good in Competition mode, but shone as a Controller game. However, he questioned why only one set of rules had been included. "With two sets of everything else, I would have hoped to have two sets of rules, especially since the game is fairly complicated so that both players will very often have to look up rules." Sanders liked the system of one unit moving and firing at a time, but noted that "a computer would come in handy" to handle combat calculations. He concluded, "Even with a mastery of all the rules, I found the Competition game to be a monumental bore — more paperwork than play. In contrast, the Controller game is so dramatic that any paperwork seems well worth the effort. For the active player, it is like being in a command post, and for the controller, acting like God."

== Other reviews ==
- The Wargamer Vol.1 #15
- American Wargamer Vol.7 #10
