= Demons (board game) =

Board game

Cover art by Howard Chaykin, 1979

Demons is a board game published by Simulations Publications (SPI) in 1979 in which players control magicians who conjure demons to aid them during a treasure hunt.

== Description ==
Demons is a fantasy game for 1–4 players which takes place in medieval Armenia in the year 1091. Each player is a magician being pursued by mortal armies while searching for treasure. To aid in both defence and the quest for treasure, a wizard can attempt to summon and control demons.

=== Components ===
The ziplock bag or game box contains:

- 11" x 17" paper map sheet
- 12-page rulebook
- 100 die-cut counters
- two Combat Tables

=== Gameplay ===
Mortal counters are moved first according to automatic rules. Magicians then have an opportunity to conjure one or several of the 72 demons and them use them to fight mortal armies or other magicians, or to search for treasure.

=== Victory conditions ===
Magicians may leave the map permanently at anytime with the treasure they have accumulated. Once there are no magicians left on the map, either having left or been killed, the game ends.

- In a multiplayer game, each magician adds up their treasure and deducts 15,000 ducats for each level of shield above copper that had been carried. The magician with the highest net total is the winner.
- In a solitaire game, the player deducts 20,000 ducats for each level of shield above copper that was carried, and wins if the net total is a positive number.

=== Incantations ===
A free sheet of incantations that could be used for game flavor could be ordered from SPI.

== Publication history ==
Demons was designed by Jim Dunnigan, with graphic design by Redmond A. Simonsen, and cover art by Howard Chaykin. It was published in both a ziplock bag version and a boxed set in 1979. After its release, the game appeared on SPI's Top Ten Bestseller list at #4, and stayed on the Bestseller list for four months.

== Reception ==
In the inaugural issue of Ares, Eric Goldberg found that he lost interest in the repetitive game mechanics, and questioned the game's replayability. He concluded by giving it a below-average rating of 6 out of 9, saying "The game may be played solitaire, and various systems are of interest, but Demons does not stand up to repeated playings."

In Issue 28 of The Space Gamer, Tony Zamparutti liked the quality of the components. While he noted the rulebook was short and easy to understand, he found some ambiguities and thought more time could have been spent on the rules. He concluded, "While Demons isn't a masterpiece of game design, it is an interesting and innovative game."

In the October 1980 issue of Fantastic, game designer Greg Costikyan wrote "Demons is too simple to hold the players' interest beyond the first couple of games. Another interesting failure."

In Issue 2 of Simulacrum, William Sariego called it "a game that is hard to classify [...] It is neither fish nor fowl, having elements of both history and fantasy. Games of such a bastard nature often fail to satisfy, as fans of one genre prefer their pet element receiving more exposure." Sariego noted some issues with the rules, and also felt the map should have been larger, saying "The constricted area for maneuver restricts players' options a great deal." Despite these problems, Sariego concluded, "the game is just another testament to the design genius of Jim Dunnigan. He may be famous for such games as Wacht am Rhein and War in the Pacific, but his true talents, in my humble opinion, show best in his small designs. Battle for Germany may be the most famous example of this, but Demons is another."

== Reviews ==
- Jeux et Stratégie #11
