= Korea: The Mobile War =

Board wargame

Cover of "flat-pack" box edition, 1971

Korea: The Mobile War is a board wargame published by Simulations Publications Inc. (SPI) in 1969 that simulates the Korean War.

== Background ==
Following World War II and the start of the Cold War, the United States and the Soviet Union agreed to divide Korea at the 38th parallel. After several border clashes in the late 1940s, North Korean forces unexpectedly invaded South Korea and successfully pushed to within a few kilometers of the southernmost part of South Korea. A United Nations force successfully landed behind the North Koreans at Incheon and cut off large numbers of North Koreans. Those who escaped encirclement retreated back to North Korea in disorder. The United Nations forces followed and were able to push to within a few kilometers of the Chinese border. At this point a large Chinese force entered the war, pushing the United Nations back into South Korea. After several back-and-forth offensives and counter-offensives, the front stabilized near the original border and became a war of attrition.

== Description ==
Korea is a two-player wargame in which one player controls the United Nations forces, and the other player controls the North Korean and Chinese forces. The game comes with three scenarios:

1. Invasion: The North Korean incursion from 25 June 1950 to 21 September 1950. (17 turns)
2. Intervention: The intercession of the United Nations and the rout of the North Koreans, 26 November 1950 to 20 January 1951. (9 turns)
3. Stalemate: The sudden assault of Chinese forces and the resultant deadlock, 20 January 1951 to 23 June 1951. (21 turns)

These scenarios can be combined into one 52-turn campaign game that covers the entire war. There are also twelve "what if" scenarios that change various factors such as earlier or later invasion or intervention, etc.

=== Components ===
The game box contains:

- 23" x 29" paper hex grid map scaled at 16 km (10 mi) per hex
- 255 die-cut counters
- a map-folded rules sheet
- small six-sided die

In the original "Test Series" edition, packaged in an envelope, the counters were paper and needed to be cut apart, and a die was not included.

=== Gameplay ===
The game uses an alternating "I Go, You Go" system of movement. The first player has three phases:

1. First Movement: All units may move
2. Combat: All units within range may fire upon enemy units
3. Second movement: All units may move again.

The second player then has the same phases. This completes one turn, which represents one week of game time.

Units are not allowed to "stack" (no more than one counter per hex) except during retreat situations if stacking is unavoidable. There are also rules for naval gunfire, sea transport, invasions, and fortifications.

== Publication history ==
In 1969, Avalon Hill dominated the wargame market, producing on average, one game per year with well-produced but expensive components. At the newly founded wargame publisher SPI, Jim Dunnigan and his design team decided to go in the opposite direction, marketing a number of very cheaply made "test games" to prove that producing many games a year could also be a viable business model. These test games featured typewritten pages with hand-drawn maps and graphics and thin paper counter sheets, packaged in a plain envelope. Korea, designed by Dunnigan, was the twelfth of these games, published in 1969.

After receiving positive reviews for the "Test Series" games, SPI reissued them in 1971, first in plain white boxes with a red title ribbon, and then in "flat pack" boxes using graphic design by Redmond A. Simonsen, featuring cover art and an integrated plastic counter tray. Korea was one of the re-published games.

== Reception ==
In Issue 21 of Albion (September 1970), Don Turnbull reviewed the Test Series edition, and was mystified by the supply rules that seemingly made it impossible to supply North Korean units in the eastern sectors of the map. "The whole matter is rather confused, and there seem to be conflicting rules on supply." But Turnbull liked the rule that forbid stacking, commenting "It's nice not to be continually looking under stacks to see what you left there." He concluded "This has all the potential for a very fine game, and [I] would recommend it highly were it not for the mystery surrounding the supply rule [...] With clarified supply rules — recommended." Two years later, in Issue 2 of the UK magazine Games & Puzzles, Turnbull added, "in the first version of Korea, there were some poor supply rules which ruined the game. Happily the rules have been rewritten and the map redrawn, and the result is a most interesting game on an off-beat subject.""

Writing for The Pouch, Nicholas Ulanov thought the Test Series game was "A good simulation of the Korean war. That's the problem, it's too realistic!" Ulanov concluded by giving the game a very good rating of 3.5 out of 4.

In his 1977 book The Comprehensive Guide to Board Wargaming, Nicholas Palmer was not overly impressed, noting that "neither side has a great choice of strategies and the general effect is not very challenging." He concluded on an ambiguous note, saying, "A good simulation and a passable game."

In Issue 17 of Moves, Omar DeWitt pointed out several ambiguities with the rules. He also did not like the map-folded rules sheet, which he found difficult to use during the game. He concluded, "Although there are items I am not pleased with, in general I like Korea. The problems I have raised are not major [...] The game itself is playable and interesting."

In The Guide to Simulations/Games for Education and Training, Martin Campion thought that the game was "an excellent simulation of the most important military problems of the campaign — supply, reinforcement, the strength of the defense, terrain, and amphibious operations." However, Campion had issues with the game rules, saying, "the game is very difficult to play because it has a large number of very specific rules. Every force moves and fights according to different rules."
