= Strategy I =

1971 board wargame

- Designers: Jim Dunnigan; Stephen B. Patrick; Redmond A. Simonsen; John Young
- Publishers: Simulations Publications Inc.
- Publication: 1971

Strategy I, subtitled "Strategic Warfare 350 BC to 1984" is a universal board wargame published by Simulations Publications Inc. (SPI) in 1971, which uses a modular system that can be configured to simulate any battle in history.

== Description ==
Strategy I uses over 1000 counters and two large abstract hex grid maps to allow the players to recreate any battle in recorded history from Alexander the Great to the present day. The large rulebook, which critic Don Turnbull declared "would be the envy of the compilers of the Great American novel", contains 36 "modules". The first few modules outline rules needed for ancient battles; as time moves forward, more modules are required that cover new weaponry such as long bows, armored cavalry and muskets. Modern battles require even more modules with rules for modern armaments, railways, naval fleets, and mechanized transportation. There are also increasingly involved rules for supply and production. For a modern battle that requires using rules from all 36 modules, the game is quite complex, and battles can take any where from 4 to 30 hours. Critic Nicky Palmer suggested that due to the extreme complexity of the rules, battles would be more manageable with teams of players on each side. The game uses a standard "I Go, You Go" system, where one player moves and attacks, followed by the other player.

=== Scenarios ===
The game comes with 17 pre-designed scenarios, which range from several battles in Ancient History to a hypothetical World War III. Each scenario suggests which modules or rules to use, and describes which map configuration to use. Players are encouraged to design their own scenarios.

== Publication history ==
In the 1960s, Avalon Hill was the main board wargame publisher in North America, and released two high-quality wargames a year. Jim Dunnigan, who worked for Avalon Hill, left to co-found SPI in 1969, with the idea of selling a lot of titles per year. In 1969 and 1970, the fledgling company published a "Test Series" of fifteen cheap wargames that featured photocopied rules, counters and maps, mailed to buyers in manila envelopes. These sold relatively well, supporting Dunnigan's business model, and the company turned to more professionally produced products called their "Simulation Series". One of the first of these was Strategy I, created by Dunnigan, Stephen B. Patrick, Redmond A. Simonsen and John Young. The company had announced their intention to publish this game in December 1969, but as co-designer John Young admitted, "Strategy I has been likened to an unwanted orphan child with leprosy. From the beginning, it was such a monstrous task that no one wanted to pick up the ball ... There was so much involved in finishing the project, that it was always more productive to finish something else than half-finish Strategy I." The publication date was pushed back to June 1970, then April 1971; the game was finally released in July 1971. By May 1972, SPI had sold 1567 copies of the game, less than the most popular Test Series games Barbarossa and Kursk, but more than any other "Simulation Series" game. A large number of errors were found in the rules, and in 1972 SPI released several pages of errata and a second edition of the game featuring corrected rules.

In a 1976 poll conducted by SPI to determine the most popular board wargames in North America by all publishers, Strategy I placed 80th out of 202 games.

== Reception ==
In Issue 31 of Albion, game designer Don Turnbull called Strategy I "a veritable monster of a game," noting "a whole host of new and fascinating details." Turnbull felt the game was "a labour of love and a tremendous triumph for the designers ... The work they have put into this project defies the imagination, as does the satisfaction they must have at the completion." However, Turnbull concluded, "I wonder if players are going to play the game in anything like its most complex form; there is just so much in it! However everyone will buy it, as indeed they should, as a collector's item without parallel in the history of board wargaming."

In the 1975 book A Player's Guide to Table Games, John Jackson was dismissive of the game, saying, "Unfortunately, all but the most hardened fanatics will lose themselves in the jungle of completely optional rules long before they have managed to hack out a playable scenario."

In his 1977 book The Comprehensive Guide to Board Wargaming, Nicky Palmer called this game an "Immensely ambitious project to simulate history throughout history." Palmer warned, "The complex production rules of the modern scenarios are very alluring to the hard-core, but even the simpler wars of earlier periods are quite a handful." Palmer found, "The main drawback, apart from the length (four hours to thirty or more), is a rather abstract flavour, so that one country is much like another." Palmer concluded that the game was "An impressive attempt, with much to interest would-be designers."

== Other commentary and reviews ==
- Games & Puzzles #4
- Panzerfaust #62
- Fire & Movement Special Issue #1
- Jagdpanther #1 & #7
- D Elim Vol 2 #12
