= Origins of World War II (game) =

Board game

Release poster

Origins of World War II is a board game published by Avalon Hill in 1971 that combines a wargame with international diplomacy to simulate the diplomatic conditions that led to the outbreak of World War II.

== Description ==
Origins of World War II is a game for 2–5 players, in which each player takes on the role of one of five world powers in the mid-1930s (USA, France, UK, Russia, Germany). Each attempts to promote the diplomatic objectives of their country while preventing the other players from achieving theirs.

=== Gameplay ===
The game starts in 1933, and each turn represents one year. The game ends in 1939, at the end of the sixth turn.

==== Objectives ====
Each player has a particular set of objectives, each of which provides a set number of victory points. These will differ from player to player — one player may earn 2 victory points for establishing an understanding with Italy, another player may earn no victory points or more victory points for the same thing.

==== Political Factors and Understandings ====
Each player goes in a particular order, the United States first, Germany last. Each receives a number of Political Factors each turn, which can be placed on any country where the player can score victory points, or the player's home country. Once a player has placed five Political Factors in a country, the player can place an Understanding in that country. Several players can simultaneously have Understandings with the same country.

==== Control ====
Once a player has placed more than five Political Factors in a country, and no other player has any Political Factors in that country, the player may place a Control on that country if it would earn that player victory points. Once a Control is in place, it cannot be removed.

In order to remove another player's Political Factors from a country, a player can attack an opponent's Political Factors with their Political Factors. The ratio of attackers to defenders is calculated, a die is thrown and a result gained from the Diplomatic Result Table. There are four possible results: the attacking player removes all their Political Factors from that country; the defending player removes all their Political Factors; the Defending player removes all their Political Factors and the Attacker removes the same number; and No Effect.

For example, France has 3 Political Factors in the Rhineland, and Germany has 6. Germany attacks France's Political Factors at a ratio of 2:1. The German player rolls a 2, meaning France must remove all 3 Political Factors, but Germany must also remove 3, leaving only 3 in the Rhineland, not enough to establish Control. If Germany had rolled a 1, only France would have had to remove Political Factors, leaving Germany with 6 and able to place a Control on the Rhineland.

=== Diplomacy ===
Germany is the most powerful player, receiving the greatest number of Political Factors each turn, and having the advantage of going last. To counteract an easy German victory, the other players must find some way of cooperating in order to limit Germany's power while still advancing their own agendas.

=== Victory conditions ===
At the end of the sixth turn (1939), victory points are awarded according to each country's national objectives. For example, if the French player has an Understanding in Austria, they gain 1 victory point. If Germany has Control of the Rhineland, they gain 5 victory points. The player with the most points wins. If Germany or the Soviet Union win with 15 points or more, then World War II has started. If any other player wins, war has been averted.

=== Scenarios ===
In addition to the "historical" scenario, four other "what if" scenarios are included: Aggressive French Policy Game, Aggressive French-British Policy Game, British-U.S. Alliance Game, and Anti-Bolshevik Crusade Game.

== Publication history ==
Game designer Jim Dunnigan had designed a couple of games for Avalon Hill, Jutland in 1967 and 1914 in 1969. Dunnigan had also designed a game, Origins of World War I, which was included in the 1969 book A Gamut of Games. Shortly afterwards, Dunnigan left Avalon Hill to form his own games company, Simulations Publications Inc. (SPI). While he was starting up SPI, Dunnigan designed another game for Avalon Hill based on his Origins of World I game but updated to the Second World War.

The game was play-tested with secondary school students at the Benjamin Franklin High School, in East Harlem, New York City (now the Manhattan Center for Science and Mathematics), by Albert Nofi, then a teacher at the school.

Origins of World War II was published by Avalon Hill in 1971, with royalties being paid directly to SPI. and was not a bestseller. In Avalon Hill's company history, published in 1980, Origins of World War II was described as "A good, simple little game which never really caught on with hard core gamers; it remains in the line primarily for its value in the school supply market where it remains an excellent classroom game." An article in Boys' Life published around the same time also noted that Origins was used in college classrooms. A set of guidelines to help teachers use the game in the classroom was published in SPI's house magazine Moves.

== Reception ==
In Issue 4 of the UK magazine Games & Puzzles, (August 1972), John Turner noted the game's simplicity, saying, "The rules are few in number and very easy to understand; they have obviously been written with a moron in mind, since they explain each point in laborious detail and with considerable repetition." He thought that "Play is rapid and holds the interest throughout; every move made by every player influences the position of every other player." He concluded by rating the physical quality of the components, the playing quality and the value for money as excellent, saying, "if you are at all interested in games, this one must be added to your collection."

In his 1977 book The Comprehensive Guide to Board Wargaming, Nicholas Palmer called the game an "Unhappy attempt to marry wargames with multi-player diplomacy." Although he agreed the game was "often tense, and easy to learn", Palmer felt the game was fatally and heavily unbalanced in favor of Germany and the USSR, noting that "no American victory [has ever] been recorded to my knowledge, although the rules claim it can be done."

In A Player's Guide to Table Games, John Jackson thought the rules, "a masterpiece of redundancy [that] obscure the issue." He also noted that "Conflict is not just inevitable; it is the crux of the game and is clearly intended to induce the frenzied negotiations and double-dealing that make Diplomacy so fascinating. In this, however, it is only partially successful." Jackson thought the major flaw in this game was that it "is not at all balanced. Germany is the overwhelming favorite, not only because it has nearly twice as many Political Factors as the next most powerful country, Britain [...] but also because it plays last; it can pick up cheap Controls in places the other players have missed, and it can frustrate an attack by the placement of a single PF."

In The Playboy Winner's Guide to Board Games, game designer Jon Freeman called this "basically a fairly simple game [that] can be played in an hour." However, Freeman found the game fatally unbalanced in favor of Germany, commenting "Germany is the overwhelming favorite, not only because it has nearly twice as many Political Factors as the next most powerful country, Britain, but also because it plays last; it can pick up cheap Controls in places the other players have missed, and it can frustrate an attack by the placement of a single Political Factor." Freeman suggested the only way to improve the game was to use hidden simultaneous moves akin to the system used in Diplomacy.

In The Guide to Simulations/Games for Education and Training, Harry Miller thought this was an excellent game for the classroom, saying, "The primary strength of Origins of World War II is its historical setting and the need for negotiations in order to win ... Such class discussion topics as nationalism, political geography, and alliances can be pursued by students. Contemporary foreign policy can be easily initiated and examined in terms of cultural ties, location of resources, military security, and international compacts."

== Other reviews and commentary ==
- Fire & Movement #73

== Other recognition ==
A copy of Origins of World War II is held in the collection of the Strong National Museum of Play (object 112.6191).
