= Minuteman: The Second American Revolution =

Board wargame published in 1976

Minuteman: The Second American Revolution is a board wargame published by Simulations Publications Inc. (SPI) in 1976 that hypothesizes a modern-day revolution in United States as the result of widespread unrest.

== Description ==
Minuteman is a two-player game that combines a political game and a traditional wargame. One player controls Rebel forces trying to revolt, and the other player controls Government forces trying to hold the revolution in check. Game designer Jim Dunnigan set the game in 2020 (which was almost 45 years in the future when the game was published in 1976), and hypothesized that most American adults would be chronically underemployed, with no hope of future advancement or improvement. As Brian Train pointed out in a retrospective review, "The future history [Dunnigan] cooks up as the framework to the basic scenario [...] seems strikingly accurate now."

=== Components ===
The ziplock bag edition contains:

- 28" x 35" paper hex grid map scaled at 200 m (220 yd) per hex
- 400 double-sided die-cut counters
- 16-page rulebook
- sheet of designer's notes

The boxed set edition also includes a small six-sided die.

=== Gameplay ===
The first phase of the game is political. Rebel networks and "Minutemen" (Rebel leaders) are placed on the map at random. The Rebel player spends the first part of the game trying to improve this setup by creating more Minutemen and secret militia. Meanwhile, the Government player uses the army and informers to try to stay ahead of the Rebellion. The Rebel player starts the second phase of the game by declaring a revolution; the game then becomes a standard military board wargame.

Optional rules can bring in the involvement of Canada and Mexico and other foreign intervention, as well as air and amphibious assaults (during the wargame part of the game). There are also rules enabling two or three Rebel players (working against each other, not as an alliance).

=== Scenarios ===
In addition to the basic game there are scenarios that involve occupation by the "European Socialist Coalition", and a second North vs. South American Civil War.

== Publication history ==
Jim Dunnigan designed Minuteman in 1976 as a counterpoint to the patriotism displayed during the American Bicentennial. The game was released by SPI packaged as a ziplock bag game and a boxed game, both featuring graphic design by Redmond A. Simonsen.

The game enjoyed only modest sales, never cracked SPI's Top Ten Bestseller List, and publication was quickly discontinued. Graphic designer Redmond Simonsen put this down to the long political phase of the game, which he said could be likened to "a simulation of the spread and growth of a fast-food chain" rather than an armed rebellion. With this in mind, Simonsen labelled Minuteman SPI's worst game of 1976.

== Reception ==
In the 1977 book The Comprehensive Guide to Board Wargaming, Nicholas Palmer called the game "Partisan warfare in America leading to a full-scale contemporary Second Revolution."

In Issue 22 of the British wargaming magazine Perfidious Albion, David Barnsdale found the basic scenario was unbalanced in favor of the government, mainly because "it is difficult for the government player to make mistakes." Barnsdale also questioned the American setting, pointing out that "the game system and the basic scenario are ill-suited for the US ... America has never fitted hack Marxist sociology at the best of times." Despite this, Barnsdale admitted this was "a very playable, and enjoyable game."

In The Guide to Simulations/Games for Education and Training, Martin Campion thought that "Minuteman is a lively and interesting game. The politics of insurgency is handled very abstractly, but this is the only game that covers the subject along with the military side at all." In terms of using it as an educational aid, Campion warned that "The multiplayer rules are vague in some important areas."

In Issue 4 of Simulacrum, Brian Train called Minuteman one of his personal favorites, saying that "It has good repeat play value because of its randomized setup and the choice of strategies open to both players." He pointed out that the Rebel player can employ various strategies, and that "A switch from one to the other at the right time can be devastating for the Government player, who, for his part, tries to inhibit Rebel growth and engages in a certain amount of 'spy vs. spy' combat later in the game." Train concluded that "The additional scenarios in the game can make for some interesting free-for-alls, especially the Second Civil War scenario which is entirely randomized at the beginning."

== Other reviews and commentary ==
- Strategist #300 and #341
- Panzerfaust #70
