= Solomons Campaign (wargame) =

1973 World War II board wargame

SPI edition, 1973

Solomons Campaign, subtitled "Air, Land, and Sea Warfare, Pacific 1942", is a board wargame published by Simulations Publications Inc. (SPI) in 1973 that simulates the struggle between the U.S. and Japan for control of Guadalcanal Island during the Pacific Campaign of World War II.

== Background ==
After the surprise attack by Imperial Japan at Pearl Harbor on 7 December 1941, a subsequent wide-ranging series of Japanese offensives in Burma, China, and the southwest Pacific put the U.S. and her allies on the defensive for the first half of 1942. Eight months after Pearl Harbor, the U.S. turned to the offensive, using combined arms to assault Guadalcanal Island, seeking to capture and retain the strategically vital airbase that became known as Henderson Field. The Japanese counterattacked furiously, resulting in a series of battles on land, at sea and in the air for control of the island.

== Description ==
Solomons Campaign is a two-player board wargame in which one player controls U.S. forces and the other controls Japanese forces. The non-traditional map divides Guadalcanal and the surrounding ocean into nineteen giant hexes. Counters for land forces display abstract point values instead of representing specific units. Naval units represent specific ships or task forces of smaller ships. Air counters represent generic aircraft rather than specific types of airplanes. With 20 pages of rules, simultaneously planned and revealed movement of air, naval and land forces, dealing with many separate operations or possible operations each turn, planning combined arms operations and dealing with problems of supply on the island, the game has been described as "quite complex."

Due to the simultaneous revealed movement system, both players must plan on the best strategic use of their forces while outguessing their opponent's likely course of action.

=== Scenarios ===
Only one 16-turn scenario is offered for the game, each turn representing one week of the battle. A non-historic "what if?" option allows the Japanese player to add one or both of the heavy battleships Yamato and Musashi.

== Publication history ==
Solomons Campaign was designed by Jim Dunnigan, with graphic design by Redmond A. Simonsen, and was published in 1973. The game received a generally positive reception from critics, but was not well received by players. In a 1976 poll conducted by SPI to determine the most popular board wargames in North American, Solomons Campaign placed a poor 128th out of 202 games.

Following the demise of SPI, Decision Games acquired the rights to the game. Joseph Miranda revised the rules, Joe Youst provided new artwork and the second edition, titled The Solomons Campaign, appeared as a pull-out game in the second issue of World at War (August 2008). A Japanese-language version of the second edition was published by Kokusai-Tsushin Co. (国際通信社) in Issue 90 of Command (January 2010).

== Reception ==
In his 1977 book The Comprehensive Guide to Board Wargaming, Nicky Palmer noted the "unusual design", the "strong strategic emphasis" and warned that it was "quite complex."

In The Guide to Simulations/Games for Education and Training, Martin Campion called this game, "one of the few games that successfully combines land, sea and air operations on approximately the same level of simulation."

== Other reviews and commentary ==
- Moves #10
- Fire & Movement #12 & #68
- The Wargamer Vol.1 #12
