= U.S.N.: The Game of War in the Pacific, 1941–43 =

1971 World War II board wargame

Cover of Strategy & Tactics #29, which contained the pull-out game U.S.N.

U.S.N.: The Game of War in the Pacific, 1941–43 is a board wargame published by Simulations Publications Inc. (SPI) in 1971 that simulates two years of the Pacific Campaign during World War II.

== Description ==
U.S.N. is a board wargame where one player controls Allied forces and the other controls Japanese forces. With 400 counters but a complex set of rules and an extremely long campaign game, it has been described as a "small monster" and "highly complex."

=== Setting ===
The hex grid map covers almost the entire Pacific Ocean and Southeast Asia.

=== Gameplay ===
Each turn has six phases:

1. Japanese movement
2. Allied movement
3. Joint air strike
4. Allied movement
5. Japanese movement
6. Joint air strike

Each of these phases is further broken down into as many as eight segments that can include naval bombardment, naval engagement and land combat.

There are also optional rules for a China front, Japanese submarines, and kamikaze attacks.

=== Scenarios ===
The entire campaign game, which covers the Pacific war from December 1941 to the end of 1943, takes 81 turns, estimated to need up to 150 hours to complete. However, there are also two shorter campaign games of twenty turns each covering either the first or the second four months of the war. In addition there are a number of much shorter "battle games" that are only two or three turns long.

The second edition of the game, U.S.N. Deluxe, offers a much longer campaign game of 192 turns that covers the entire war from 1941 to 1945, but also many more shorter scenarios, including an 8-turn Burma campaign. It also includes a "War Plan Orange" scenario that hypothesizes a Pacific War between Japan and the United States in the 1930s.

== Publication history ==
Jim Dunnigan founded Poultron Press in 1969 to save the foundering Strategy & Tactics wargaming magazine, and to publish wargames. Dunnigan changed the name of the company to Simulations Publications in 1971, and one of the first games published under the new name was U.S.N., designed by Dunnigan, with graphic design by Redmond A. Simonsen. The game was first published as a free pull-out game in Issue 29 of Strategy & Tactics. Its 400 counters made U.S.N. unusual — for several years afterwards, SPI's magazine games were limited to 100 counters. SPI also offered this game for sale as a boxed set.

In 2004, Decision Games released U.S.N. Deluxe, a greatly expanded edition with 800 counters and many more scenarios, designed by Joseph Miranda and Michael Myers.

== Reception ==
In a 1976 poll to determine the most popular board wargames in North America, the four-year old U.S.N. was still relatively popular, placing 44th out of 202 games.

In his 1977 book The Comprehensive Guide to Board Wargaming, Nicky Palmer called this game "absorbing and highly complex." Palmer warned that it was "a long game."

In The Guide to Simulations/Games for Education and Training, Martin Campion suggested that this game was better played by two teams of "several people who are thoroughly immersed in this kind of game, [with] unlimited time." Campion commented "USN does offer an excellent simulation of some of the problems of the war." However, he felt that allowing the Japanese player to coordinate and plan their offensive as one master plan was not historically accurate, saying "the [Japanese] offensive never slows down because of indecision or lack of information, and the Japanese will achieve more than they should."

In Issue 28 of Warning Order, Matt Irsik reviewed U.S.N. Deluxe by Decision Games and noted the emphasis on logistics, saying, "Every offensive has to be planned carefully, transports need to be marshaled, oilers and ships topped off at bases, then the attack can begin. The game forces you to look at capturing forward bases, constructing airfields, and many other things that most games skip over." However, Irsik did not think this was a "fun" game to play, noting that the game was a long grind: "There will be numerous turns of combat where neither side does much than shoot down a few points of aircraft. Disappointing at first, but the cumulative result may pay dividends 20 or 30 turns down the road. The question is, do you want to game that out? The answer is that this is not for everyone or gamers looking for a quick Pacific game." Irsik concluded, "In the end USND accomplishes one thing very well, namely showing the scope of the Pacific theater and the long campaign it was. The game is about organization, planning, logistics, and coming up with a strategy across a huge area, which isn't easy to do. The game is a realistic simulation of the theater, but it is definitely for grognards and those who have time to leave the game out for several weeks or months."

== Other reviews and commentary ==
- Moves #7 and #9
- Fire & Movement #12 and #68
- Panzerfaust #55, #61 and #64
- Paper Wars #68
