= The Franco-Prussian War (wargame) =

1972 board wargame

The Franco-Prussian War, subtitled "August 1 to September 2, 1870", is a board wargame published by Simulations Publications Inc. (SPI) in 1972 that simulates the 1870 war between the Second French Empire and the North German Confederation led by the Kingdom of Prussia.

== Background ==
France, egged on by inflammatory rhetoric from Prussian Prime Minister Otto von Bismarck, declared war on Prussia in July 1870. The French army, still using antiquated tactics and inflexible leadership from the time of Napoleon, proved no match for the Prussian army with its new general staff model of leadership, intensive training, and use of modern technologies such as railways and artillery. The capture of Napoleon III and then Paris and the rapid defeat of France not only was a stunning demonstration of Prussia's military capabilities, but also culminated in Bismarck's ultimate goal, the unification of the independent German kingdoms and duchies into a single German Empire, with himself as Chancellor.

== Description ==
The Franco-Prussian War is a two-player board wargame in which one player controls Prussian forces, and the other controls French forces. With each counter representing an entire army corps, there are very few counters on the board at a time, with a maximum of 18 German corps and 11 French corps. The French corps have more strength but move more slowly than the German corps.

With a complex turn sequence, and many factors to consider in terms of combat, rail movement, and leadership, the game has been described as "fairly complex."

== Basic game ==
The simpler Basic game is meant to familiarize players with the rules, and uses a standard "I Go, You Go" alternating system, where the Prussians add reinforcements, move and attack. Then the French get the same opportunities, completing one game turn, which represents three days of the war.

During the movement phases, Prussians can move up to two corps via railway while the French can only move one corps. If Prussian railways are damaged by the French, the Prussians can employ unlimited numbers of Eisenbahnbautruppen units (Railway Construction or EB units) to repair the lines. If a French railway is damaged, the French can only have three EB units on the board at a time.

Combat results in the removal of strength points from both the attacker and the defender. When this happens, the current unit counter is replaced with a counter showing the unit's current strength. Once a unit is reduced to zero strength, it is removed from the game.

== Standard game ==
The Standard game uses all the same rules as the Basic game, but adds significant complexity.

=== Inverted and dummy counters ===
In order to simulate the limited military intelligence of the time, all units on the board are placed face down, and remain that way until attacked. In addition, both sides can utilize dummy counters, which are discarded if attacked, but may be re-used. Game critic Omar DeWitt, writing in 1973, believed that "Although the idea of dummy counters has been around for some time, [The Franco-Prussian War] is the first game, to my knowledge, that actually incorporates them."

In addition, each player places an inverted Formation Status marker on inverted corps counters. If and when the corps is flipped over, the unit's formation status will be revealed as either:

- Extended Formation: The unit has a zone of control but fights at half strength.
- Concentrated Formation: The unit has no zone of control but fights at full strength.

=== Movement ===
Due to the inverted counters, movement is a more complex procedure in the Standard game. During the Movement phase, the active player moves units as desired, but can also launch "probe attacks" at enemy counters to reveal their strength at a minimal risk. If the counter revealed is a dummy, then the dummy counter is removed from the board and the unit can continue to move if it has any movement left.

=== Scenarios ===
Although there is only one main scenario in the game, there are a variety of alternate non-historical orders of battle that can be used to create "what if?" scenarios. Game critic Martin Campion noted that choosing different orders of battle secretly and at random would increase the complexity of the game and "make for a fascinating situation."

=== Victory conditions ===
Both sides can gain Victory Points by fulfilling certain geographical objectives and by the destruction of enemy strength points. The side with the most Victory Points at the end of the eleventh turn is the winner.

== Publication history ==
SPI founder Jim Dunnigan designed The Franco-Prussian War, which was released as a boxed set with graphic design by Redmond A. Simonsen in 1972. By 1976, the game had fallen out of favor — in a poll conducted by SPI to determine the most popular board wargames in North America, The Franco-Prussian War only placed 159th out of 202 games.

== Reception ==
Writing in The Pouch, Nicholas Ulanov did not like the game because of the inverted counters, calling it, "the worst of the hidden movement games. Nothing happens and it's too slow."

In his 1977 book The Comprehensive Guide to Board Wargaming, Nicky Palmer called it an "operational level simulation of the war which alerted the world to Prussian strength." Palmer called the used of inverted counters an "elementary form of hidden movement."

In Issue 7 of Moves, Martin Campion noted the hidden movement system had both positive and negative effects, saying, "The game provides a valuable and promising system for hidden movement, with inverted fighting counters half hidden by the presence of inverted dummy counters. But because this system is new it gives rise to numerous problems of interpreting rules." Campion also noted that the game was unbalanced in favor of the Germans, writing, "The French seem to have little chance of winning the historical scenario but can play for a draw and hope that the Prussian gets careless." Campion concluded, "Despite a number of bugs, The Franco-Prussian War is worth investing in, both as history and as an innovative playable game."

Writing a retrospective review for The Wargamer, Bill Gray called this "not only one of the most playable yet historically accurate games on the 1870 tussle between Bismarck and Napoleon III, but unlike most, one that completely immerses the player in the same swamp of frustration and bewilderment of the original commanders. Easy to learn, tough to win, I have played many nail-biting simulations before, but this is one of the few able to make both players look absolutely stupid." Gray concluded, "Of the several different titles that have attempted, over the years, to simulate this somewhat obscure conflict, this game still remains my personal favorite. A number of other treatments have appeared since 1972, and a few of them have even been interesting, but I still keep returning to this one."
