= PanzerArmee Afrika (board game) =

Board wargame

Box cover

PanzerArmee Afrika, subtitled "Rommel in the Desert, April 1941 - November 1942", is a board wargame published by Simulations Publications, Inc. (SPI) in 1973 that simulates the World War II North African Campaign that pitted the Axis forces commanded by Erwin Rommel against Allied forces. The game was revised and republished in 1984 by Avalon Hill.

== Description ==
In February 1941, Erwin Rommel was ordered to stabilize the situation in North Africa after British troops routed the Italian army. This game simulates Rommel's campaign from April 1941 until his defeat at the Battle of El Alamein in November 1942.

== Components ==
The magazine pull-out edition had the following components:

- One 22 x 34" paper hex grid map, scaled at 12 mi (19 km) per hex
- 200 die-cut counters
- 12-page rules booklet

SPI also published the game in a "flat-pack" box with integral counter tray and clear plastic lid.

In the Avalon Hill boxed set, the map was mounted, and a 6-sided die was included.

=== Gameplay ===
Each turn, which represents a month of game time, is divided into 4 phases for the Allied player, and then the same phases for the Axis player:

1. Supply Determination Phase
2. Movement Phase
3. Combat Phase
4. Replacements and Reinforcement Phase

=== New rules ===
This game used several unusual rules:

- If a unit survives an attack, it can counterattack at double strength.
- Supply units, which must be set up in a chain, do not move themselves, and can be captured by enemy units.
- Units have 50–60 Movement Points, considered a very large number in comparison to other wargames

== Publication history ==
PanzerArmee Afrika was designed by Jim Dunnigan, with the system design and graphics by Redmond A. Simonsen and game development by Irad Hardy and Hank Zucker. It was first published by SPI in Strategy & Tactics #40, and also in a "flat-pack" box.

After SPI was taken over by TSR in 1982, TSR sold off some of SPI's games to Avalon Hill, including Panzergruppe Guderian and PanzerArmee Afrika. Avalon Hill printed a revised edition of PanzerArmee Afrika in 1984 in a "bookcase" box.

== Reception ==
In his 1977 book The Comprehensive Guide to Board Wargaming, Nicholas Palmer called it an "enduringly popular operational-level game." He noted the "lightning movement emphasized with movement factors up to sixty." Palmer also highlighted the "controversial Command Control system [...] realistic and extremely irritating for the player affected!" He concluded, "Moderate complexity, good choice of strategic and tactical options, rather realistic."

In a post-publication discussion in Moves #17, SPI R&D staff agreed that if both players were aggressive, gameplay would favour the Allied player; but if the Axis player was content to simply occupy Tobruk and defend it, the result was almost guaranteed to be an Axis marginal victory.

In The General, Bob Medrow felt that the revised Avalon Hill edition took away the "reasonably careful and conservative" play option that had guaranteed a German victory in the older SPI edition. He concluded that the new rules made a good game even better, saying, "For years, [the SPI edition of] PanzerArmee Afrika was a favorite among garners looking for a fast-moving, exciting challenge. [...] The Avalon Hill Game Company is to be congratulated on keeping this game on the market — and even improving it."

In Volume 25, Issue 6 of The General, Martin Shaw made an in-depth analysis of the strategies and tactics of this game and warned players the game was never over until the final skirmish, pointing out, "In this game of desert warfare you should never give up, as it is very easy for you to leave a seeming gap in your lines so your opponent can fatally overextend himself as he rushes through that gap." Shaw concluded, "Victory in PanzerArmee Afrika will usually go to the bold, but rarely to the reckless. And that, in conclusion, sums up this intriguing, challenging game best of all."

In The Guide to Simulations/Games for Education and Training, Martin Campion commented, "For a short game, PanzerArmee Afrika gives the feel of the North African campaign well. The supply rule is abstract and difficult to remember, but the rest of the game moves smoothly." Campion concluded, "The game shows many of the factors that were important in the campaign, but it does not show that Axis supply was erratic, a fact which continually influenced Rommel's plans to attack."

== Other reviews ==
- Fire & Movement #10 and #60
- Europa #6-8
- Simulacrum #19
- Pursue & Destroy #17
- Wargame News #17
