= Agincourt (game) =

1978 Medieval board game

Agincourt, subtitled "The Triumph of Archery over Armor, 25 October 1415", is a board wargame published by Simulations Publications, Inc. (SPI) in 1978 that simulates the Battle of Agincourt.

== Description ==
Agincourt is a 2-player wargame in which the English and French forces face each other at the Battle of Agincourt.

=== Components ===
- a full-colour contour map of the battlefield using a hex grid scaled to 34 yards (31 m) per hex
- 270 counters
  - 45 cardboard counters representing military units (32 French and 13 English)
  - other counters representing dead soldiers and survivors from battle
- rulebook
- player reference sheets
- twenty-sided die

=== Gameplay ===
Each player sets up their forces at either end of the board. Each turn counts as three minutes of game time. Each player takes turns moving, after which the opponent can use archery fire. After movement is finished, units are checked for morale. If any units are adjacent to an enemy unit, melee combat is resolved with a 20-sided die, and damage uses a step-reduction system, with each damaged unit generating dead and fugitives. Fugitives move randomly, and units encountering them lose the rest of their movement.

=== Victory conditions ===
The French player wins by inflicting casualties at a rate of less than 7 French to 1 English. The English player wins by raising the casualty rate to 7 to 1 or greater.

== Publication history ==
Agincourt was designed by Jim Dunnigan, with artwork by Redmond A. Simonsen, and was published as a boxed set by SPI in 1979.

== Reception ==
In the July 1979 edition of Dragon (Issue #27), Tim Kask called the game "incredibly playable" but "very complex." Kask did find a major problem with the fugitives: as battles progressed, it became difficult to remember which fugitives belonged to which side, since they were both represented by identical counters: "For every line that everyone lost, there is a fugitive marker running around somewhere, or there are combined fugitive markers running around, if they all happen to form in the same hex. And these markers running around all over creation can become quite difficult to keep track of in their random movement, and which way they’re supposed to go next. And it can bog down the game and just be fugitive movement phase." However, Kask admitted the survivors were an important element of the game, and concluded "I feel that Agincourt is a major design triumph."

In Issue 43 of Moves, Charles Vasey was not impressed, saying, "If the game adequately simulates the battle, I cannot say I find it a good game. It seems to me to be both long and tiresome with a multitude of dice and calculations." Vasey thought the lack of viable tactics the worst part of this game. He concluded, "Agincourt is not a game I would play again."

In the next issue of Moves, David Smith concurred with Vasey. He felt the game was fatally unbalanced against the French, pointing out "there is no other possible outcome than needless die-rolling, record-keeping, and eventually French slaughter." He admired the combat system, which he called "novel", but felt that it was lost on this game, and suggested, "The archery tables, morale concepts, and personal combat ideas are all ready to be transported into a more fitting subject." He concluded by suggesting that historians would congratulate SPI for accurately depicting the inevitable French defeat, but "the gamer will hope that [the game designers] apply the same reasoning to other battles with less predestined results."

In the 1980 book The Complete Book of Wargames, game designer Jon Freeman noted "This is the first game really to treat medieval warfare as a serious subject. The system is intense — down to lost arrows and dead bodies littering the field." However, Freeman concluded on a down note, saying, "As a history lesson, Agincourt is virtually without peer. As a game, it is a stultifying bore, replete with endless die-rolling and a total lack of heart-stopping action."

== Other reviews ==
- Strategy & Tactics #68
- American Wargamer Vol. 6 No. 7
- Ann Arbor Wargamer #20
