= Foxbat & Phantom =

Vietnam War-era aerial combat wargame

Cover of the Designer's Edition box

Foxbat & Phantom, subtitled "Tactical Aerial Combat in the 1970's", is a board wargame published by Simulations Publications Inc. (SPI) in 1973 that simulates aerial dogfights using jet aircraft technology from the early 1970s.

== Description ==
Foxbat & Phantom is a two-player game in which both players control flights of three jet aircraft chosen from a list of 14 different aircraft. One player is the Intruder, sending a flight into disputed airspace. The other player, as the Interceptor, sends a flight to fight the Intruders.

=== Components ===
The "flatbox" edition includes:

- 22" x 34" paper hex grid map
- 255 die-cut counters
- rules folder
- 16 aircraft control charts (8 blue, 8 pink)

The "Designer's edition packaged in a bookcase box replaced the paper map with a 2-piece mounted map and included a small six-sided die.

=== Scenarios ===
The rules come with a large chart that lists the likely Intruder/Interceptor combinations in hotspots of the early 1970s: NATO/Warsaw Pact, Israel/Arab, India/Pakistan, North & South Korea, South Africa, Vietnam, and Taiwan/China.

== Publication history ==
Foxbat & Phantom was designed by Jim Dunnigan, with graphic design by Redmond A. Simonsen, and was published by SPI in 1973. The game was published in three different formats: a plain white box with a red title ribbon, a "flatpack" plastic box, and a "Designer's Edition" bookcase box. It was a reasonably popular game; in a 1977 poll undertaken by SPI to determine the most popular wargames on the market in North America, Foxbat & Phantom placed a respectable 80th out of 202 games.

== Reception ==
In A Player's Guide to Table Games, John Jackson commented, "Though it lacks the variety, flexibility, and initial simplicity of Richthofen's War, the incredible aircraft involved have an appeal of their own."

In the 1977 book The Comprehensive Guide to Board Wargaming, Nick Palmer commented "As with most games of the type, the main interest focuses on exploring the strengths and weaknesses of the different aircraft, and games are fast and simple." To aid in this, Palmer suggested adding a short time limit per move, pointing out that "to spend (as some players do) thirty minutes pondering each move is more suggestive of a duel with pikes by exceptionally ponderous peasants in a swamp."

In the 1980 book The Complete Book of Wargames, Jon Freeman wrote that "In an admittedly limited way, the game vividly depicts some of the elements of modern air combat." He did point out that the simplicity of the game guarantee that "restrictions of the design and some inaccurate assessments distort the capabilities of various aircraft." Freeman concluded that "Nonetheless, the game is fun and far more playable than its 'successor', Air War."

In Simulacrum #9, Joe Scolari pointed out the game's biggest asset, its simplicity, saying, "Until someone comes up with a modification of Game Designer's Workshop's Blue Max system that works for the jet era, Foxbat & Phantom will likely remain the beer and pretzel king of jet combat games." He concluded, "The stripped down approach of Foxbat & Phantom makes for a quick playing game that still conveys basic air combat tactics. Be prepared to accept large doses of speculation and abstraction."

In The Guide to Simulations/Games for Education and Training, Martin Campion called this "a very believable simulation of the problems of dogfighting with planes capable of supersonic flight. However, the missions are written in such a way that many of the planes in the game cannot win." He also pointed out that although planes are equipped with cannons, radar-guided missiles and heat-seeking missiles, only radar-guided missiles can actually shoot down anything. Campion concluded, "The game is quite difficult to learn, although it moves more quickly once it is learned."

In Issue 16 of the British wargame magazine Perfidious Albion, Gray Boak suggested there were major problems with the rules, especially climb and altitude performances for both the Phantom and the Foxbat, and suggested some major rule refinements for a more realistic game.

== Other reviews and commentary ==
- JagdPanther #3, #4, #9 and #13
- Strategy & Tactics #45 & #57
- Pursue & Destroy Vol.1 #4 and Vol.2 #2
