= Combined Arms (game) =

Board wargame

The cover of Strategy & Tactics #46, which contained Combined Arms as a pull-out game

Combined Arms, subtitled "Combat Operations in the 20th Century", is a board wargame published by Simulations Publications Inc. (SPI) in 1974 that simulates various combat engagements in the mid-twentieth century

== Description ==
Combined Arms, is a two-player game that examines various combats from the 1939 German invasion of Poland to the 1973 Yom Kippur War. As the game's title implies, each scenario requires coordination of infantry, armor, and artillery.

=== Components ===
The game includes:

- 22" x 28" paper hex grid map scaled at 300 m (330 yd) per hex
- 200 die-cut counters
- 8-page rulebook
- two chart sheets

=== Gameplay ===
The game uses a conventional "I Go, You Go" system of turns, where the first player moves and engages in combat, then the second player has the same opportunity. Each player, on their turn, has five Phases:

- Command Control Determination
- Movement & Reinforcement
- Combat
- Disruption Removal
- Interdiction Removal

The end of the second player's phases marks the end of one Game Turn (1 hour of real time.)

=== Scenarios ===
The game includes six scenarios. The first, an introductory scenario to learn the rules, is hypothetical. The other five are based on historical battles:

1. Hypothetical battle in Russia during World War II, 12 July 1943
2. German attack on Polish-held bridges across the Vistula River, 2 September 1939
3. Battle of Prokhorovka, 12 July 1943
4. Battle of Arracourt, 19 September 1944
5. Battle of the Chinese Farm, 15 October 1973
6. Heartbreak Ridge, 13 September 1951

== Publication history ==
The development of Combined Arms encountered several problems and delays before the game was published in 1974 in Strategy & Tactics #46 and also as a boxed set. Designer Jim Dunnigan later thought "The game worked but it had no spark." Game developer Christopher Allen said during the game's creation that "nothing seemed to go right." He created a large number of scenarios but admitted "They were either dull, clumsy or unbalanced" and only six were eventually included with the game. Graphical designer Redmond A. Simonsen confessed that "The Combined Arms ennui struck me as well. The counters were boring, the map was boring, and the tables and charts offered only a limited opportunity for presentation design. Even the counter colors came out dull." The game's playtesters joked that "Combined Arms may be complex, but it's dull." Given the game's development problems, it was unsurprising that the game was not popular — in a 1977 poll of wargamers conducted by SPI to determine the popularity of every wargame that was on the market in North America at the time, Combined Arms was rated only 195th out of 202 games.

== Reception ==
In his 1977 book The Comprehensive Guide to Board Wargaming, Nick Palmer called it a "Disastrously unpopular game featuring tactical operations of the 1939–1980 time span." He recommended that wargamers looking for a wargame involving combined operations spend their money on one of several others in that genre such as PanzerBlitz or Panzer Leader.

== Other reviews and commentary ==
- Fire & Movement #65
- Jagdpanther #14
