= Revolt in the East =

1976 Cold War-themed board wargame

Strategy & Tactics #56 containing Revolt in the East

Revolt in the East, subtitled "Warsaw Pact Rebellion in the 1970's", is a Cold War-themed board wargame published by Simulations Publications Inc. (SPI) in 1976 that simulates a hypothetical rebellion of Warsaw Pact states against the Soviet Union, with possible intervention by NATO forces.

== Description ==
Revolt in the East is a two-player board wargame where one player controls Soviet forces and the other player controls the forces of other Warsaw Pact nations such as Czechoslovakia, East Germany, Bulgaria and Poland. The second player also controls NATO forces, which can intervene and support the rebellious states if certain conditions prevail.

As the nations of the Warsaw Pact rebel, the Soviet player must crush each rebellion.

=== Gameplay ===
With only 100 counters and a basic "I Go, You Go" alternating system of turns where one player moves and attacks followed by the other player, the game has been characterized as "fairly simple." Terrain costs for movement vary from country to country.

The NATO player rolls dice at the start of each turn to see which of the Warsaw Pact countries (if any) rebel against the Soviets.

Each scenario runs for twelve turns. The player controlling the most cities at the end of the scenario is the winner.

=== Scenarios ===
In addition to the general rebellion scenario, the game also includes simulations of the Hungarian Revolution of 1956 and the 1968 Warsaw Pact invasion of Czechoslovakia, as well as an uprising in Yugoslavia following the hypothetical death of Tito in 1976. (Tito would not actually die until 1980.)

== Publication history ==
In 1976, Jim Dunnigan designed Revolt in the East and it was published as a free pull-out game in Issue 56 of SPI's house magazine Strategy & Tactics, with graphic design by Redmond A. Simonsen. It was also offered for sale packaged in a ziplock bag.

== Reception ==
In his 1977 book The Comprehensive Guide to Board Wargaming, Nicky Palmer called this "A lively corp/army level simulation of anti-Communist revolts in Eastern Europe." Palmer questioned why some countries with stronger ties to the Soviet Union such as Bulgaria were just as likely to revolt as other countries such as Romania. Palmer also noted that the game was very luck-dependent.

In the 1980 book The Complete Book of Wargames, game designer Jon Freeman called the game, "too dependent on luck for some tastes" but also noted that the randomness of the rebellions "adds variety to the game and preserves its novelty over repeated playings." Freeman gave this game an Overall Evaluation of "Good", concluding, "A lively and pleasant diversion."

In The Guide to Simulations/Games for Education and Training, Martin Campion recommended the game as a classroom tool for Grades 9 and up, but noted that in the historical scenarios set in 1957 Hungary and 1968 Czechoslovakia "the history [has been] changed to allow the conflicts to spread."

The game was a regular staple of wargamers for over a decade; in 1989, at the start of the Polish uprising, BattlePlan published a game variant based on Polish unrest.

In a retrospective review in Issue 9 of Simulacrum almost 25 years after the game's release, Luc Olivier noted "[Designer Jim] Dunnigan’s mechanisms of the game are still interesting to discover. [...] All in all the Russian units play a game of fire brigade, while the enemies must try to survive or rush to help." Olivier concluded, "in spite of the old and dated background, Revolt in the East provides an interesting situation [...] The game is hard to win for either side, and quite balanced."

== Other reviews and commentary ==
- Strategy & Tactics #56
- Fire & Movement #15
- Jagdpanther #14
