= World War I: 1914–1918 =

1975 WWI board wargame

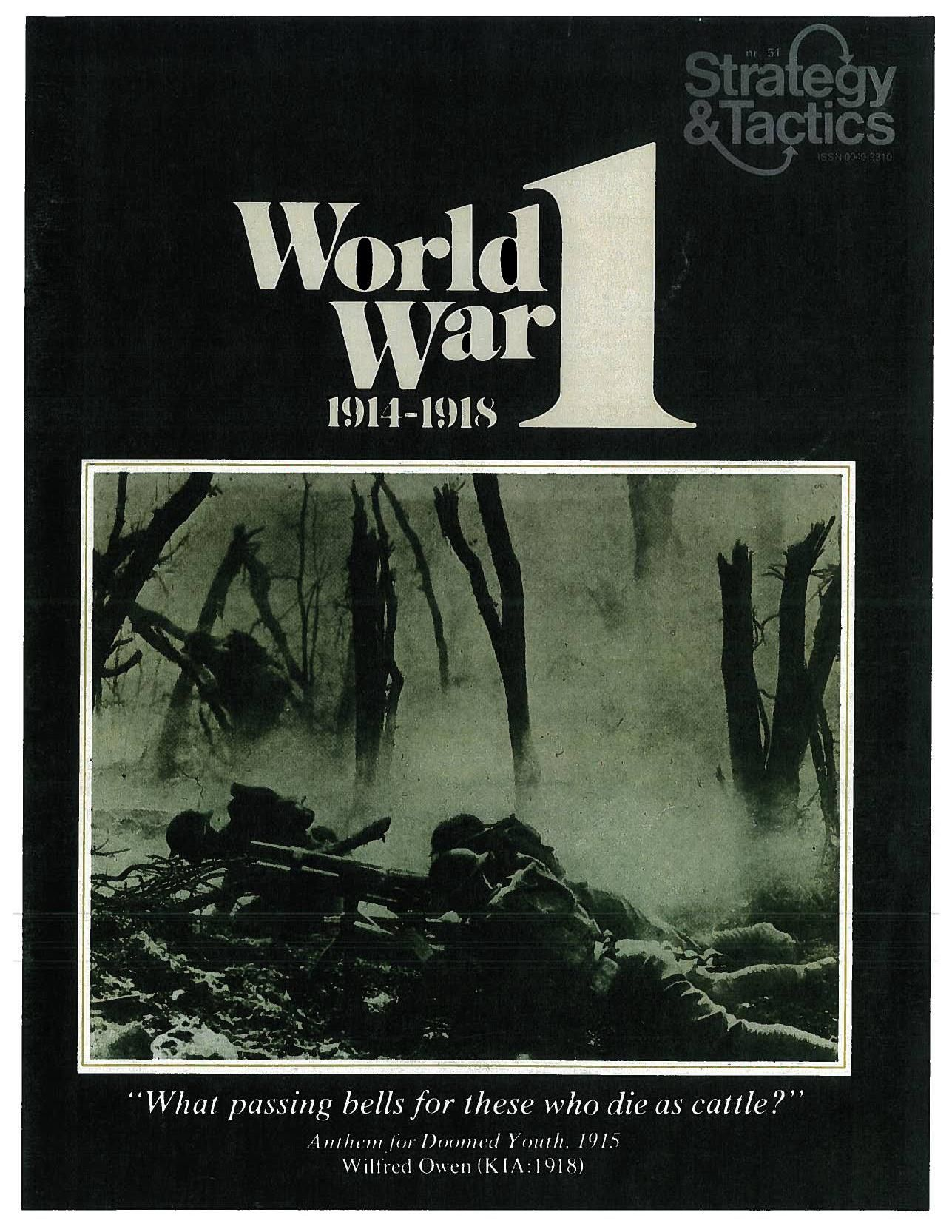
Cover of Strategy & Tactics #51, which contained World War I as a pull-out game

World War I: 1914–1918 is a board wargame published by Simulations Publications Inc. (SPI) in 1975 that simulates the First World War at a strategic level. Contemporary critics gave the game positive reviews, noting that its ingenious rules, short playing time, and emphasis on resource management made the game highly playable.

== Description ==
World War I is a two-player board wargame where one player controls the Triple Entente (aka "the Allies": Russia, England, and France) and the other player controls the Central Powers (Germany, Austro-Hungary, and Turkey).

There are also a number of small neutral countries on the map. There is a chance during each turn that one of them will ally with one side or the other, based on historical alliances. If a Central Power invades a neutral country, it joins the war on the side of the Allies.

With only 100 counters and 8 pages of rules, the game has been characterized as "simple" and "moderately complex."

== Gameplay ==
=== Combat Resource Points ===
Combat Resource Points (CRPs), which symbolize industrial capacity and are accumulated by both players at the end of each turn, form the heart of the game. A player can choose to use CRPs to build new combat units and fortifications. Each player can also transfer CRPs between countries within their alliance.

CRPs held in reserve are significant during combat — the player with the most CRPs attacks first. Banked CRPs can also be used to mitigate points of damage from combat:

- A defending unit can pay for the damage points in CRPs, or by retreating the unit a number of hexes equal to the number of damage points, or by eliminating the unit.
- An attacker can only pay for damage points with CRPs or eliminate the unit.

There may be strategic reasons why a player might eliminate a unit rather than using CRPs to save it.

=== Movement and attack ===
All units have the same rate of movement, and can move on foot or via railway. In addition, the Allies can use sea transport. The game uses a non-traditional system of movement and attack:

1. The Allies move, and then the Central Powers move.
2. Three rounds of combat follow. The player with more CRPs attacks first, followed by the other player.

This completes one turn, which represents six months of the war. The game lasts for ten turns.

In most wargames, increasing the ratio of attackers to defenders increases the odds of damaging or eliminating the defender. However, in this game, increasing the number of attackers simply increases the losses on both sides. Attackers always take more damage than defenders.

Russian and Rumanian units take double damage from German attackers. This is often enough to eliminate Russia well before the game ends.

=== Supplies ===
Units are supplied if they can trace an unhindered line to a friendly city; unsupplied units cannot attack and only defend at half strength. Units that are still unsupplied at the end of a turn are removed from play.

=== Stoßtruppen and tanks ===
Beginning in the sixth turn (Winter of 1916–17), the Germans may build one Stoßtruppen (Stormtrooper) unit per turn. When these units win an attack, the defending unit must retreat rather than paying for combat damage with CRPs.

In Turn Nine (Summer of 1918), the French may build tank units at a cost of five CRPs each. The tanks attack with the same effect as Stoßtruppen.

=== Victory conditions ===
Victory Points are earned in several ways:

- Both players earn Victory Points by possessing or being the last to pass through a Resource Center.
- The Central Powers gain Victory Points if Russia surrenders; the sooner in the game that this happens, the more Victory Points are earned.
- If a Neutral country is brought into the game as a result of being invaded, the non-invading player earns Victory Points.
- The Allied player automatically earns Victory Points in recognition of the British naval blockade.

The player with the most Victory Points is the winner. If both players have the same number of points, the game is a draw.

== Publication history ==
In 1975, in a move away from large and complex such as Drang Nach Osten! and Wacht am Rhein, SPI co-founder Jim Dunnigan designed some smaller games with 200 or fewer counters that could be played in a single evening. World War I was one such product, published in 1975 as a free pull-out game in Issue 51 of SPI's house magazine Strategy & Tactics. The game, with graphic design by Redmond A. Simonsen, was also published as a "folio game", packaged in a double LP-style cardstock folio. Despite good critical reception, the game was not popular and did not crack SPI's Top Ten Bestseller list. In a 1976 poll conducted by SPI to determine the most popular board wargames in North American, World War I only placed 101st out of 202 games.

In 1986, Hobby Japan published a Japanese-language edition of World War I in Issue 27 of the wargaming magazine Tactics.

Decision Games acquired the rights to World War I and published a second edition in 1994 that featured revised rules, 20 more counters and a full-color map.

== Reception ==
In his 1977 book The Comprehensive Guide to Board Wargaming, Nicky Palmer thought this was a brilliant game for its size, writing, "a small map squeezes in every front in continental Europe, and extremely ingenious rules encompass the whole war at a grand strategic level, enabling the game to be played in a few hours." Palmer did think the game was unbalanced in favor of the Allies, and noted that this might be the cause of the game's relative lack of popularity. Nonetheless, Palmer concluded that this game was "Exciting and highly playable; moderately complex; realism a bit doubtful at this eagle's-eye-view level." In his 1980 sequel, The Best of Board Wargaming , Palmer added "the game retains tension and interest as the combat resource points reserves constantly teeter on the brink of exhaustion." Palmer concluded by giving the game an Excitement Grade of 65%.

In the 1980 book The Complete Book of Wargames, game designer Jon Freeman called this game, "a surprisingly enjoyable treatment of a fundamentally dull subject. The game simulates both the economic nature of the war and its lack of movement but — amazingly — remains fun to play." Freeman gave this game an Overall Evaluation of "Good", concluding, "There is something to be said for a game in which you have twenty pieces and seldom lose any — as opposed to having hundreds, gobs of which go regularly to the dead pile."

In Issue 2 of Zone of Control, Eric and Jane Lawson reviewed the second edition produced by Decision Games in 1994, and thought that "this game is definitely suitable for someone new to wargames [...] With mechanics and components that are easily handled by novices, it also serves as an excellent introduction to the hobby." The Lawsons liked the revised rules, "rewritten for style rather than content." They found that "Play is clean and unencumbered. [...] Again the focus is on grand strategy and not a search for loopholes by rules lawyers." They concluded that the new edition was "much brighter, both graphically and in the style of its rules."

In a retrospective review written 25 years after the game's publication, Brandon Einhorn thought that "the game is simple, plays quickly, but has a generic no-frills feeling." Einhorn concluded, "Overall, the game's strengths are its fast play time, nostalgia from our youth and the SPI name. But the game has problems that need to be fixed and it's somewhat bland."

== Other reviews and commentary ==
- Paper Wars #21
- The Wargamer Vol.1 #8
- Moves #24
- American Wargamer Vol.3 #2
- Pursue & Destroy Vol.2 #6
- Perfidious Albion #91
