= 1918 (wargame) =

Board wargame

- Cover of 2nd edition in "flatpack" box, 1972
- Designers: Jim Dunnigan
- Illustrators: Redmond A. Simonsen
- Publishers: SPI
- Publication: 1970
- Genres: WWI

1918, subtitled "Operation Michel: March 21–30, Germany's Last Chance in the West", is a board wargame published by Simulations Publications Inc. (SPI) in 1970 that simulates Operation Michael, the final German offensive on the Western Front in which they tried to win the war or at least force peace talks before American soldiers started to arrive on the Western Front in force. The game was well received by critics, but did not sell well.

== Background ==
The United States declared war on Germany in 1917, and it was obvious that overwhelming numbers of American soldiers would be arriving in Europe by the latter part of 1918, swinging the defensive stalemate on the Western Front in favor of the Allies. The German High Command knew they had a limited amount of time to somehow force the Allies to come to the negotiating table seeking peace on Germany's terms. The withdrawal of Russia from the war in late 1917 gave Germany this opportunity, as large numbers of German soldiers were transferred from Russia to the Western Front, where they were secretly trained in new infiltration tactics using Stoßtruppen (stormtroopers). Germany unexpectedly launched Operation Michael in March 1918, a major offensive that sought to drive a wedge between the British and French forces. In only seven days, German forces tore a large hole in the Allied lines and advanced 65 km (40 mi), coming within 75 km (45 mi) of Paris. Unless the Allies were able to blunt this attack, it would be a sudden end to the war.

== Description ==
1918 is a two-player wargame in which one player controls the German attacking forces, and the other player controls Allied defenders. The Germans begin with an overwhelming advantage mainly driven by a limited number of Stoßtruppen units; as they advance, supplying the offensive units becomes difficult. The Allied player must give ground and play for time, waiting for an opportunity to resist the offensive.

=== Components ===
The original "Test Series" game was packaged in a plain manila envelope and included:

- 23 in × 29 in (58 cm × 74 cm) paper hex grid map scaled at 2.8 km (1.8 mi) per hex
- a sheet of 255 paper counters (to be cut apart by the players)
- a typewritten rule sheet

The second edition of the game featured professionally printed components and die-cut counters, was packaged in a "flatpack" box, and included a small six-sided die.

=== Gameplay ===
==== Turns ====
1918 uses an "I Go, You Go" alternating system of turns. The German player starts each turn with three phases:

- Movement
- Combat
- Second Movement

The Allied player then has the same phases. This complete one full game turn, which represents one day of game time. Each game lasted ten turns.

==== Zones of control ====
Zones of control (ZoC) do not force adjacent units to fight, but a unit cannot move from the ZoC of one enemy unit to the ZoC of another enemy unit. There are two exceptions to this rule:

- a German Stoßtruppen can move one hex from one enemy ZoC directly to another enemy ZoC, simulating German "infiltration" techniques. (Since there are two movement phases, it is possible for a Stoßtruppen unit to move from one ZoC to a second on the first movement phases, and then move from the second to a third ZoC on the Second Movement phase.)
- Leapfrog Withdrawal: A unit in an enemy ZoC can jump onto an adjacent friendly unit in an enemy ZoC as long as the second unit has not moved in the current Movement phase. As reviewer Charles B. Turner noted, "This is especially useful to the Allied player because [they] will need it repeatedly to save [their] units that have been surrounded by German infiltration.".

==== Stacking ====
Only two units may be stacked. Both units can attack, but only one of the units can defend, and only that defending unit is subject to combat results.

==== Terrain ====
Difficult terrain (requiring double the cost in movement) is marked on the map, a gray area directly west of the German start line and covering most of the Allied trenches and rear areas. This represents the area deliberately devastated by the Germans as they retreated back to the Hindenburg Line in 1917. Ironically, the German devastation severally impedes their planned offensive.

==== Supply ====
An unsupplied unit cannot fight. For any unit to be considered supplied, it needs to be able to draw either a 5-hex line through friendly territory to a road that leads off a friendly edge of the map (called "general supply"), or a 4-hex line through friendly territory to a supply counter. If a unit goes on the attack, it consumes the supply counter, which is removed from the board. The supply counter can't return to the board until the next friendly Movement Phase. If a unit that traces its supply to a supply counter only defends and does not attack, it does not consume the supply counter. The German player will usually have to expend between three and five supply units per turn in order to keep their offense rolling.

=== Scenarios ===
The game comes with one historical scenario, as well as 13 "what if?" scenarios that provide various Orders of Battle to shift the numbers and types of units on both sides.

=== Victory conditions ===
==== Historical scenario ====
At the end of ten turns, the Germans gain

- 10 points for controlling Arras
- 15 points for controlling Amiens
- 5 points for controlling Montdidier
- 1 point for every German unit that exited off the southern, western or northwestern edges of the map

If the Germans gain 10–25 Victory Points, the German player wins. If they only gain 5–9 points, the game is a draw. If the Germans are limited to less than 5 points, the Allied player wins.

== Publication history ==
In 1969, Avalon Hill dominated the wargame market, producing on average, one game per year with well-produced but expensive components. At the new wargame publisher Poultron Press, co-founder Jim Dunnigan and his design team decided to go in the opposite direction, marketing a number of very cheaply made "Test Series" games to see if producing many games a year could also be a viable business model. These test games featured typewritten pages with hand-drawn maps and graphics and thin paper counter sheets, packaged in a plain manila envelope. 1918, designed by Dunnigan, was the fourteenth of these games, published in 1970, and proved to be one of the more popular of the Test Series.

After receiving positive reviews for the "Test Series" games, SPI reissued several of the games with professionally printed components. This included a second edition of 1918 in 1972 in which several rules were revised based on player and reviewer comments. The second edition was first packaged in a plain white box with a red title ribbon, and then in a "flat pack" box with graphic design by Redmond A. Simonsen, featuring cover art and an integrated plastic counter tray.

The game did not sell well. In a 1976 poll conducted by SPI to determine the most popular board wargames in North America, 1918 was only rated 128th out of 202 games. As Redmond A. Simonsen noted eight years after its publication, "It suffers from being about WWI, being 'old', and not having state-of-the-art graphics and rules."

== Reception ==
In Issue 15 of Albion, Don Turnbull reviewed the "Test Series" edition, packaged in a manila envelope, and noted that the components were a somewhat "less-that-average presentation." However, Turnbull was quite pleased by the game rules, and thought that "the actual play of the game more than compensates for any disadvantage [provided by the components]." He found that "Play itself is absorbing, yet fairly quick," and "The outcome of the game is always in doubt until the final moves, which promises an exciting finish, and all in all the game can provide a very pleasant and interesting afternoon or evening." Turnbull concluded on a positive note, saying, "Another first-class game, and one which we have no hesitation in recommending to readers."

In Issue 3 of the UK magazine Games & Puzzles, (July 1972), game designer Don Turnbull reviewed the Test Series game, and noted that it was not only one of his personal favorites, but it was "one of the most successful early Test Series games." He called it "a most playable game, both face-to-face and by post, and contains some rules which at the time of publication were pure innovations, and which have become the basis for further development since." He concluded it was "Likely to remain popular."

In Issue 7 of Moves, Martin Campion noted, "The second edition demonstrates how greatly improved a game can be by a few minor adjustments in the rules. [...] These rules and a few others put the punch in the German attack that was missing in the first edition." Campion concluded that the game "should please anyone who wants to explore the German possibilities in 1918."

In his 1977 book The Comprehensive Guide to Board Wargaming, Nick Palmer thought the game did not sell well because "The problem of First World War games is to simulate trench warfare without making things boring, as in the marvellously detailed 1914 [also designed by Jim Dunnigan and published by Avalon Hill in 1968] which was lovely to look at but a dour struggle indeed." However, Palmer believed 1918 provided more opportunity for maneuvering, saying it "gives a good chance of German breakthroughs, the main constraint on rapid advance being supply and the difficulty of getting adequate artillery support."

Writing almost a decade after 1918's original publication, Charles B. Turner admitted the game had not been a bestseller for SPI, saying, "Because 1918 is an older game and because games on World War I have never been particularly popular, 1918 is almost forgotten today. This is unfortunate, for 1918 is quite a good game that is rarely decided until the last turns." After examining the game rules in detail, Turner concluded, "Although some aspects of the game are handled rather abstractedly, 1918 recreates the overall flow of the German Operation Michel offensive quite well. [...] 1918 is a must for anyone interested in World War I or for anyone who is looking for an interesting game of yesteryear."

== Other reviews and commentary ==
- Jagdpanther #7
- D-Elim Vol.2 #2
- International Wargamer Vol.3 #10
- The Wargamer Vol.2 #22
- Albion #25
