= Lost Battles: Operational Combat in Russia =

1971 WWII board wargame

Lost Battles
- Cover of the 1972 boxed edition
- Designers: Jim Dunnigan
- Illustrators: Redmond A. Simonsen
- Publishers: Simulations Publications Inc.
- Publication: 1971
- Genres: WWII

Lost Battles: Operational Combat in Russia is a board wargame published by Simulations Publications Inc. (SPI) in 1971 that simulates hypothetical combat situations set in the Soviet Union during World War II.

== Description ==
Lost Battles is a two-player operational wargame in which one player takes the role of Soviet forces, and the other controls the Germans. The four included scenarios are hypothetical rather than historical, and are intended to convey the flavor of combat along the southern front from Belgorod to the Sea of Azov rather than simulate actual battles.

=== Components ===
The original edition, published as a pull-out game, included:

- 22" x 28" paper hex grid map scaled at 2 km (1.2 mi) per hex
- 255 die-cut counters
- map-folded rules sheet
- various charts and player aids

The boxed set edition also included an errata sheet dated May 1973 and a small six-sided die.

=== Gameplay ===
The game uses an alternating "I Go, You Go" system, with the following phases:

- First Movement
- Combat
- Ranged Artillery Combat
- Initial Armored Combat
- Final Ground Combat
- Air-Strike Combat
- Second Movement

Once one player has completed these phases, the second player is given the same opportunity. This completes one game turn, which in turn represents 24 hours of game time.

In order to simulate fog of war, both players are randomly given one of several possible objectives to complete to win the scenario. Each player must discern their opponent's objective and attempt to prevent its completion based on their opponent's play.

== Publication history ==
Lost Battles was designed by Jim Dunnigan, with graphic design by Redmond A. Simonsen, and was published as a pullout game in Strategy & Tactics No. 28 (August 1971). The following year, SPI released it in their standard "flatpack" box with integrated counter tray. Unlike many of their other games, SPI did not create any further scenarios or additional material for Lost Battles.

At the end of 1972, SPI conducted a survey of wargamers, asking them to judge games released during year in ten different categories. Although the physical quality and layout of the die-cut counters used in Lost Battles was above average, game balance of the scenarios was below average; all other categories were judged to be average.

Although the game initially sold well, only having four scenarios limited long-term replayability and enthusiasm faded. In a 1976 poll conducted by SPI to determine the most popular wargames in North America, Lost Battles came in a dismal 193rd out of 202 games, the second lowest rating received by an SPI game.

== Reception ==
In his 1977 book The Comprehensive Guide to Board Wargaming, Nicholas Palmer called this game "Highly complex", and suggested a better alternative was PanzerBlitz by Avalon Hill.

Geoff Barnard noted that Lost Battles introduced some innovative road travel rules, pointing out that "although road movement was fast, it was often very complicated and could cause all sorts of problems, especially when you tried to move up the artillery units which took up vast amounts of 'road space' as compared to normal units."

== Other reviews and commentary ==
- Strategy & Tactics No. 28
- Fire & Movement No. 62
- D-Elim Vol.2 No. 11
