= Tank! (wargame) =

1974 board wargame

Strategy & Tactics #44, which contained Tank! as a free pull-out game

Tank!, subtitled "Armored Combat in the 20th Century", is a board wargame published by Simulations Publiucations Inc. (SPI) in 1974 that simulates tank versus tank and tank versus infantry combat set anywhere from World War II to the middle of the twentieth century.

== Description ==
Tank! is a board wargame for two players in which each controls opposing forces. Unlike other wargames that have movement and attack/defense statistics printed on the game counters, the counters for Tank! only have generic silhouettes of tanks, anti-tank guns and infantry. Similarly the hex grid map is generic, with various colors representing different types of terrain depending on the scenario.

The game uses a simultaneous action system. Each unit is allowed only one action per turn (movement, attack or pause); at the start of each turn, the players write down what action each of their units will take during the turn (where each unit will attempt to move to, or if attacking, which enemy unit is targeted, or if paused, what opportunity fire the unit will make on advancing units). These actions are revealed simultaneously. Then the turn takes the following sequence:

- Panic: Each player checks their units to see if any are panicked.
- Direct Fire
- Movement (and Opportunity Fire if it has been triggered)

Completing all of these phases represents one Game Turn.

The original game comes with 13 scenarios as well as tank statistics for 18 tanks and three anti-tank guns. A game expansion provides additional tank statistics, more rules and new scenarios.

== Publication history ==
Tank!, designed by SPI founder Jim Dunnigan, was published as a free pull-out game in Issue 44 of SPI's house magazine Strategy & Tactics (May–June 1974) with graphic design by Redmond A. Simonsen. SPI also released it as a boxed set that included expanded rules, more tanks and more scenarios. In a 1976 poll conducted by SPI to determine the most popular wargames in North America, Tank! placed 102nd out of 204 games.

== Reception ==
In his 1977 book The Comprehensive Guide to Board Wargaming, Nicky Palmer called this a "Solid tactical game; there is also an expanded version for the ambitious."

In The Guide to Simulations/Games for Education and Training, Martin Campion placed this game, in terms of complexity, somewhere between Tobruk (Avalon Hill, 1975) and PanzerBlitz (Avalon Hill, 1970). Campion called the map "versatile since it can be read to represent three different kinds of terrain." Campion concluded, "Tank! offers a fairly simple approach to the tactical problems of armored warfare and the comparisons of the weapons used in it."

Geoff Barnard commented "I always rather liked Tank!, especially when you stuck to the early weapons and tanks; with the later years, the system began to fail as a hit became almost automatic." Barnard also pointed out that "quick movement was a great provider of safety, as the system clearly showed the problems of hitting a moving vehicle target." However, Barnard found one of the big faults to be the map, which he found "neither realistic or exciting." And Barnard also pointed out that "as its title states, this game is concerned primarily with tanks, hence the infantry rules can be considered useless, which is a pity as parts of the artillery rules are quite good." Barnard concluded that Tank! "is a good game for experimenters."

Because of its changeable map and wild card counters, many wargaming magazines of the time published new scenarios and variant rules for the game. For example, in Issue 12 of JagdPanther, game designer Stephen V. Cole suggested variant rules to introduce tactical aviation and paratroopers to the game.

Similarly, in Issue 5 of the British wargaming magazine Phoenix, Mike Costello commented "I see Tank! as falling into the category of games that are worth saving despite some glaring faults; it's potentially so good that it is worth spending a little time on revision, and it is also excellent value for the money." Costello went on to suggest several rule revisions that he felt would improve the game.

== Other reviews and commentary ==
- Fire & Movement #65
- Panzerfaust #69 & #74
- Outpost #3
- Pursue & Destroy #16
