= Berlin '85 =

Cover of boxed edition, 1980

Berlin '85, subtitled "The Enemy at the Gates", is a battalion-level board wargame published by Simulations Publications, Inc. (SPI) in 1980 that hypothesizes an attack on West Berlin by the Warsaw Pact.

== Description ==
Berlin '85 is a game set in the 1980s during the Cold War in which the NATO forces in Berlin, composed of French, British, and American military units, and West Berlin Police, are attacked by Soviet/Warsaw Pact military units in a battle involving both time and attrition. The game uses SPI's "Modern Battles Quad" rules with new rules for urbanized terrain, subways, fire storms, gas warfare, rubble, police, supply and airpower.

=== Components ===
The game includes:

- 22" x 32" hex grid paper map of West Berlin scaled to 1 km (0.6 mi) per hex
- 200 counters
- rulebook

=== Scenarios ===
Three scenarios are included:

1. Unity: A surprise attack by the Warsaw Pact
2. Werewolf: NATO is expecting an attack
3. Medicine Wheel: NATO sortie into East Berlin

Each scenario lasts 16 turns, each of which represents 8 hours of game time.

=== Gameplay ===
1. At the start of the turn, Warsaw Pact can ask NATO to surrender, the success of which is determined by various factors of the battle plus a die roll.
2. The NATO player may attempt to gain emergency reinforcements with a die roll.
3. Warsaw Pact: checks supplies, moves units, paratroop drop, combat.
4. NATO: checks supplies, moves units, combat.

The scenario lasts for 16 turns, or until NATO surrenders or the Warsaw Pact occupies the entire city.

=== Victory conditions ===
"Unity" and "Werewolf": For the first two scenarios:

- The Warsaw Pact earns Victory Points for each non-police unit it has on the map at the end of the scenario, multiplied by the special Victory Point factor. (The factor is dependent on the turn in which Berlin fell, and can be as high as 5 in Turn 1, and as low as 0.5 in Turn 16.) If the Warsaw Pact did not capture the city by the end of Turn 16, it receives no Victory Points for units on the board.
- The Warsaw Pact earns 5 Victory Points for each mech or airborne division it did not use during the game.
- The NATO player receives 5 Victory Points for each turn in which it interdicted Warsaw Pact communications, and 8 Victory Points for each turn when any NATO unit occupied the rail line south of the city.
- NATO's total is then subtracted from Warsaw Pact's total. The Warsaw Pact wins if it has 120 or more points. NATO wins if Warsaw Pact's point total is less than 120.

"Medicine Wheel": For the third scenario, both sides are awarded Victory Points for occupying territory and eliminating enemy units. The player with the most Victory Points at the end of the scenario is the winner.

== Publication history ==
Berlin '85 was designed by Jim Dunnigan, with cartography and graphic design by Redmond A. Simonsen, and was originally published as a pull-out game in Strategy & Tactics # 79. It was also released as a boxed set. The game was not a top seller for SPI, failing to make SPI's Top Ten list in the months after its release.

== Reception ==
Kristan J. Wheaton reviewed Berlin '85 in The Space Gamer No. 30. Wheaton commented that "All in all, Berlin '85 is a game with many problems, but ultimately worth purchasing. An experienced player will recognize the faults in the game mechanics and change them to make a more balanced, exciting game. This is not a game for beginners, as they will not be able to adjust to the grossly unbalanced system. It is obvious that in Berlin '85, it is the subject and not the game that is 'the thing.'"

In Issue 29 of Phoenix, Donald Mack wrote, "Its combination of a tried and true system plus a few clever additions to emphasize the peculiar nature of the hypothetical battle which it simulates produces a tense game for both players, with swift Soviet victory or drawn-out Soviet failure."

In Issue 50 of Moves, Nick Karp noted that although Berlin '85 uses an older game system, it also introduces a lot of new concepts such as gas warfare and the use of subways for movement that give it a modern feel.

== Awards ==
At the 1981 Origins Awards, Berlin '85 was a finalist for the Charles S. Roberts Award in the category "Best Twentieth-Century Game of 1980".

== Other reviews ==
- The Wargamer Vol.1 # 17
- Line of Departure # 48
- Wargame News # 21
- Strategist # 304
