= NATO: Operational Combat in Europe in the 1970s =

Board game

Original SPI edition, 1973

NATO: Operational Combat in Europe in the 1970s is a board wargame published by Simulations Publications Inc. (SPI) in 1973 that simulates an invasion of Western Europe by the Warsaw Pact.

== Description ==
NATO is a tactical wargame at the divisional level for two players that simulates a surprise attack by Warsaw Pact forces against NATO forces defending Western Europe in the 1970s.

=== Components ===
The game comes with:

- hex grid map of Central Europe with a north–south axis of Denmark to Switzerland and an east–west axis of Poland to Belgium. The scale of the map is 15 miles per hex.
- 36-page rulebook
- 3 pages of rules errata
- die-cut counters

=== Gameplay ===
The game comes with four scenarios:

1. "M + 1": Both sides are at peacetime mobilization. The Warsaw Pact player is not obligated to immediately invade, and can delay as both sides prepare for an attack. After the fifth turn, the NATO player can also initiate combat.
2. "M + 31": The scenario begins with both sides at peak readiness
3. "M + 1 + Nukes": The same as #1, but with the addition of tactical nuclear weapons
4. "M + 31" + Nukes": The same as #2, with the addition of tactical nuclear weapons

=== Victory conditions ===
Both players earn Victory Points by destroying enemy units, and by capturing or recapturing cities. Each scenario lasts 20 Turns once hostilities commence. The player with the most Victory Points at the end of the scenario wins the game.

== Publication history ==
NATO was designed by Jim Dunnigan and published by SPI in 1973.

In 2003, Decision Games acquired the license to the game, revised and streamlined the rules, and republished it in Strategy & Tactics #220 as Group of Soviet Forces Germany.

In 2018, Compass Games acquired the license for the game and reimplemented it as Brezhnev's War: NATO vs. the Warsaw Pact in Germany, 1980, hypothesizing an invasion of Western Europe after the fall of Saigon and before the Soviet invasion of Afghanistan.

== Reception ==
In his 1977 book The Comprehensive Guide to Board Wargaming, Nicholas Palmer noted the relatively high rating of this game in a 1977 poll conducted by SPI (44th out of 209 games), commenting "The poll takes a jaundiced view of many operational-level games, but it rates this one well, and with good reason." Palmer liked the back-and-forth nature of the game, as the NATO forces inevitably thrown back by the Soviets start to stiffen in good defensive positions. He concluded, "Some queries on realism, but thrilling from start to finish."

In the July/August 1978 issue of Phoenix (#14), Ralph Vickers gave an in-depth review of the original SPI game, and found that the various design factors of the game "not only allow the players to draw on the full arsenal of subterfuge and surprise but also the many ways NATO can be played strategically makes a game of long-lasting interest." Vickers did find some problems with the rules, especially the special rules for Denmark, commenting "It is difficult to imagine why these cumbersome, hairy, creaking rules were included in this otherwise lean, clean game." Despite this, Vickers concluded with a strong recommendation, saying, "All in all, NATO properly played is a fascinating game — in almost every regard it's a classic."

In Issue 31 of The Wargamer, John D. Burtt compared the 10-year-old game NATO to just-published The Red Storm published by Yaquinto Games. He found NATO to be a much more complex game, and used unit movement as an example: In Red Storm, all units use one standard type of movement, but in NATO there are eight different options for movement. Burtt pointed out several other areas where the rules of NATO involve much more complexity, including supply lines, tactical nuclear weapons, and combat. He did feel the rules for NATO had been created in a rush, as evidenced by the three pages of errata. Despite this, Burtt concluded that he preferred the much more complex NATO to the simpler Red Storm, saying that NATO "provided a more satisfying game experience."

In The Guide to Simulations/Games for Education and Training, Martin Campion noted that "There are a few political rules to complicate the military action." He concluded with a warning: "The game involves a large number of units and is difficult for that reason."

== Awards ==
At the 2005 Origins Awards, Decision Games' 2003 edition, Group of Soviet Forces Germany, was a finalist for the "Charles S. Roberts Best Modern Era Boardgame of 2004", and the "Charles S. Roberts Best Magazine-Published Boardgame of 2004".

== Other reviews ==
- Moves #13
- Fire & Movement #15
- Fire & Movement #39
