= The American Civil War: 1861–1865 =

Strategic simulation board game

Cover of Strategy & Tactics #43, which contained the pull-out game. The same artwork was used on the boxed set released later the same year.

The American Civil War: 1861–1865 is a board wargame published by Simulations Publications Inc. (SPI) in 1974 that is a strategic simulation of the American Civil War.

== Description ==
The American Civil War is a two-player game in which one player takes the role of Abraham Lincoln, controlling the Union forces, and the other player takes the role of Jefferson Davis, controlling the Confederate forces.

=== Components ===
The magazine pull-out edition contains:

- 22" x 34" paper hex grid map of American states in 1861
- 200 die-cut counters
- map-fold rule set

The boxed edition also includes a six-sided die

=== Scenarios ===
In addition to the historical game covering the entire Civil War, the rules also include a number of "what-if": scenarios, such as "What if Robert E. Lee had commanded the Union army?"

=== Gameplay ===
The game uses a traditional "I Go, You Go" format, where one player completes all the phases of a turn, and then the other player completes the same phases. The phases are:

- Reinforcement
- Attrition Phase
- Command Control
- Supply Judgment
- Movement
- Combat Phase
- Supply Attrition Phase

Although the focus is on land combat and Command Control and Supply prove vital to victory, naval and riverboat combat are also important.

== Publication history ==
The American Civil War was designed by Jim Dunnigan, with graphic design by Redmond A. Simonsen. It originally appeared in 1974 in Strategy & Tactics #43 as a pull-out game, but was also released the same year as a boxed set.

In 1982, SPI was unexpectedly taken over by TSR. For a short while, TSR continued to publish SPI's house magazines; In 1983, Issue 93 of Strategy & Tactics contained a revision of the game designed by Joseph Reiser and Bruce Shelley, with artwork by Kristine L. Bartyzel and James Holloway.

The game was republished as a pull-out game by Decision Games in Strategy & Tactics #310 (May–June 2018). Kilovolt Designs published a Chinese-language boxed set in 2018, and Kokusai-Tsushin Co., Ltd. (国際通信社) published a Japanese-language edition (戦略級 南北戦争)in Command Magazine #145 (February 2019).

== Reception ==
In his 1977 book The Comprehensive Guide to Board Wargaming, Nicholas Palmer noted that this was a game at a "grand strategic level" played at the level of corps and armies. He suggested this might not fulfill the needs of wargamers looking for more tactical combat, saying "Big-game hunters should look instead at War Between the States [a 1200-counter tactical wargame published by SPI in 1977]."

In Issue 15 of Moves, Steve List was not impressed by the Command Control rule, saying, "This device is dearly beloved by the designer and therefore used almost indiscriminately." List went on to suggest a number of ways to modify this rule for better play.

In the November 1974 edition of Airfix Magazine, Bruce Quarrie noted "The game is a strategic one recreating the entire war, and although complicated is very playable and by far one of the most engrossing games [Strategy & Tactics] have designed for some time." He was also pleased by the various options, commenting on the "effects of border states changing sides, of European recognition of the Confederacy, and of European intervention in the conflict, permitting endless permutations." He concluded, "A very good game."

In The Guide to Simulations/Games for Education and Training, Martin Campion called this game "an excellent simulation of many of the strategic problems of both sides in the war." Campion concluded, "It would be particularly good for team play since there are several fronts to look after."

== Other reviews and commentary ==
- Strategy & Tactics #45, #93 & #310
- Fire & Movement #19 & #81
- The Grenadier #20
- Jagdpanther #12 & #13
- Outposts #2 & #4
- The American Wargamer Vol 2 #5
