= Oil War: American Intervention in the Persian Gulf =

Board wargame published in 1975

Cover of Strategy & Tactics #52, which contained Oil War as a pull-out game

Oil War: American Intervention in the Persian Gulf is a board wargame published by Simulations Publications, Inc. (SPI) in 1975 that simulates a hypothetical invasion of oil-producing countries in the Middle East in response to the oil crisis of 1973.

== Background ==
In October 1973, members of the Organization of Arab Petroleum Exporting Countries (OAPEC), led by Saudi Arabia, proclaimed an oil embargo targeted at nations that had supported Israel during the Yom Kippur War: Canada, Japan, the Netherlands, the United Kingdom and the United States (although later extended to Portugal, Rhodesia and South Africa.) As a direct result, the price of a barrel of crude oil rose almost 300% by March 1974. Nick Palmer noted that "there was a good deal of speculation on the feasibility of an American intervention to seize the [oil] wells on the grounds of economic self-protection."

== Description ==
Oil War is a two-player wargame in which one player controls American and allied forces invading oil-producing nations of the Middle East to seize oil wells, and the other player controls defending forces. With a small 17" x 22" hex grid map and only 80 counters, the game has been characterized as "not complex".

=== Gameplay ===
The game uses the following phases:

1. Land all American aircraft
2. American supply: Allocate air transport points and pay them to keep American units in supply (unsupplied units move at half rate)
3. American air transport phase
4. American movement phase
5. American air combat phase
6. Land all Arab aircraft
7. Reinforcement phase
8. Arab movement phase
9. Arab air combat phase
10. Ground combat phase

This completes one turn, which represents two days. The game only lasts 8 turns.

=== Victory conditions ===
The American player wins by controlling at least 15 of the 25 oil facilities and one of three ports by the end of the last turn. The Arab player wins by preventing this.

=== Scenarios ===
There are three scenarios:

- In response to an Iranian incursion into Iraq, the U.S. sends forces to fight alongside the Iraqis.
- Invasion by American and European forces (but not Israel).
- Invasion by American, European and Israeli forces.

== Publication history ==
Oil War was designed by Jim Dunnigan less than a year after the end of the OAPEC oil embargo. It was released as a free pull-out game in Issue 52 of Strategy & Tactics (October 1975) with graphic design by Redmond A. Simonsen. It was also published as a folio game (packaged in a double LP-sized cardstock folder, and as a boxed set. The game failed to attract an audience, and did not crack SPI's Top Ten Bestseller list.

== Reception ==
In the inaugural issue of Perfidious Albion, Charles Vasey's first impression was positive, but on closer examination, he found several serious flaws, including the map scale, bombing rules, lack of zone of control for aircraft, and "non-appearance of the various navies."

In the 1977 book The Comprehensive Guide to Board Wargaming, Nicholas Palmer stated that "The game system is not very complex, but unusual, with the entire US force air-lifting into the action. The US has air domination, but the defenders have considerable ground superiority, and the race to seize the wells in the eight turns allowed is touch and go. Some interesting problems for both sides, but probably not enough sustained suspense for the hard-core. Playable in a few hours."

In the 1980 book The Complete Book of Wargames, game designer Jon Freeman noted the relative unpopularity of the game, saying, "Oil War has never received much notice in wargaming circles. Perhaps the situation portrayed is too discomforting to be popular." He complimented the game system, calling it "one of the more novel and innovative game systems around [...] clean and fast, and the situation [...] is fluid and exciting." However, Freeman had an issue with the numbers of American aircraft, saying, "the portrayal of naval air units is unrealistic in regard to both the particular aircraft capabilities and the numbers shown – unless we are to assume that the entire U.S. Pacific carrier force is cruising the Gulf of Oman!" Freeman concluded by giving the game an Overall Evaluation of "Good."

In Issue 27 of the UK wargaming magazine Phoenix, Donald Mack also noted its unpopularity, calling it "An under-rated game." Writing in 1980, five years after the game's publication and the year after the Iranian Revolution, Mack noted that the game was "now rather dated by events in Iran." He found the game balanced, noting that "The Allied player will have little difficulty in defeating the mixed bag of Arab/Iranian ground and air forces opposed to him, but this will not gain him any victory at all: this can be achieved only by capturing and holding a sufficient mix of oil and port hexes, and that in the limited time imposed by a comparatively short game."

In a retrospective review in Issue 8 of Simulacrum, Luc Olivier commented on the supplied scenarios, writing, "Realistic or not today, those scenarios are fun, fast and well balanced, dealing with an air assault to seize airbases, to bring more troops and supply only by air bridges from Europe and Israel." Olivier concluded, "All in all, Oil War is a quick and clever design, quite outdated today but with some interesting learning about the use of a combined air operation. It is just a pity that only a very classical warfare is shown and that many options are missing, like helicopter transport between points on the map, the guerilla terrorism against the oil well garrisons, and the political subtleties of the region."

In Issue 16 of Panzerschreck, James Meldrum thought that not enough scenarios had been supplied by the designers, and suggested a fourth, a hostage situation in the late 1970s.

== Other reviews and commentary ==
- American Wargamer #2
- Battleplan #9
- Campaign #79
- Fire & Movement #69
- JagdPanther #11 & #15
- Outposts #8
- Panzerschreck #7
