= Wargame Design =

Nonfiction book

Wargame Design: The History, Production, and Use of Conflict Simulation Games
- First edition
- Language: English
- Publisher: Simulations Publications, Inc.
- Publication date: 1977
- Pages: 186

Wargame Design: The History, Production, and Use of Conflict Simulation Games is a book published by Simulations Publications, Inc. in 1977.

== Contents ==
Wargame Design is a 186-page book that provides information on games useful for both game designers and historians of the games hobby, as well as a game bibliography, a glossary and a list of symbols used in games.

== Reception ==
G. Arthur Rahman reviewed Wargame Design in The Space Gamer No. 15. Rahman commented that "As a final assessment, this reviewer shall compare Wargame Design to a very good recipe, with something left out. We welcome it as it stands, but we can use much more."
