= Riel Rebellion =

The Riel Rebellion (or more precisely Riel Rebellions) is the name often given to two uprisings led by Louis Riel in what are now Manitoba and Saskatchewan.

These were:

- The Red River Rebellion of 1869
- The North-West Rebellion of 1885
