= Battle for Germany =

- Cover of Strategy & Tactics No. 50, which contained Battle for Germany
- Designers: James F. Dunnigan
- Publishers: Simulations Publications
- Publication: 1975
- Genres: Board wargame
- Skills: Strategy

Battle for Germany is a board wargame published by Simulations Publications Inc. (SPI) in 1975 that simulates World War II operations in Germany during 1945

== Description ==
Battle for Germany is a 2-player strategic-level wargame that simulates the collapse of German defenses during the last four months of the Second World War, when American, British and French forces pressed German's Western Front, and Soviet forces attacked Germany's Eastern Front.

Unusually, the Allied and German forces are divided between the two players. The American player also plays the Germans that are defending the Eastern Front against the Soviet Union. The Soviet player also plays the Germans defending the Western Front. Thus, each player plays both offense and defense each turn.

=== Victory conditions ===
Each player tries to capture as much German territory as possible while preventing the opponent from doing the same on the other side of the board. Captured cities are worth either 1 or 2 Victory Points. Berlin is worth 10 Victory Points. The player with the most Victory Points when Berlin falls is the winner.

== Publication history ==
Battle for Germany, designed by Michael Bennighof and Jim Dunnigan, was first published by SPI in the May 1975 edition of Strategy & Tactics (Issue 50). SPI subsequently published both a folio edition, and a boxed "Designer's Edition." The game was not popular, and failed to crack SPI's Top Ten Games list after publication.

After SPI went out of business, Decision Games acquired the right to Battle for Germany and published a boxed set with new cover art.

== Reception ==
In the January 1976 edition of Airfix Magazine, Bruce Quarrie liked the game, saying it "gives the players the best of both worlds, each being able to play the aggressive attacker and the tenacious defender at one and the same time."

In the June–July 1976 edition of Moves (Issue 27), Leon Higley noted that "complexity and some realism have been sacrificed at the altar of playability" but he concluded, "Battle for Germany does give a fair representation of the last six months of the war, particularly the desperate situation of the Germans."

In his 1977 book The Comprehensive Guide to Board Wargaming, Nicholas Palmer called splitting the German fronts between the two players "An imaginative idea." He found the game "Very fast (1-2 hours), well balanced between the two main players and with a simple basic system." He concluded, "Not a bad game for beginners and useful for anyone wanting a quick game, but weak on realism."

In the 1980 book The Complete Book of Wargames, game designer Jon Freeman called this "a novel and interesting game to play." He concluded by giving the game an Overall Evaluation of "Very Good", saying, "Tactical options are somewhat limited because of the one-way direction of movement and the fortified lines on the wester front. The game system, however, is smooth and playable."

In Issue 50 of Moves, Steve List called Battle for Germany "one of the more unusual strategic games." He thought the game system was "fairly simple", but called the division of Germany between the two players like "playing two different games in alternation, using the same map." He concluded, "While not overly detailed, this is something more than an abstracted game. {...} It is basically a good game."

In The Guide to Simulations/Games for Education and Training, Martin Campion called the game "Odd, but it works." He concluded by noting that once Germany collapses, the two players can fight it out as Soviets versus Americans.

== Other reviews and commentary ==
- Fire & Movement No. 62
- Paper Wars No. 19
- Pursue & Destroy Vol. 1, No. 3
