= World War 3: 1976–1984 =

1975 Cold War board wargame

World War 3: 1976–1984 is a Cold War-era board wargame published by Simulations Publications Inc. (SPI) in 1975 that simulates a hypothetical non-nuclear war for control of the world set in the 1970s. The game sold very well, and was one of SPI's top-selling games for almost a year.

== Description ==
World War 3 is a two-player board wargame in which one player controls the Soviet Union and associated allies, and the other player controls the United States and its allies. The game board is an atlas of the world. Despite having 600 counters and 12 pages of rules, World War 3 has been characterized as "not a complex game".

=== Gameplay ===
The game uses an alternating "I Go, You Go" system. The Soviet player moves first:

- Naval forces
  - Movement
  - Attack
- Ground forces
  - Movement
  - Attack
- Reinforcement
- Industrial production

The American player then has the same opportunities. This completes one game turn, which represents 3 months. The game lasts 20 turns (five years).

To simulate a surprise attack, the Soviet player receives advantages in movement and attack for the first four-game turns (one year), allowing the Soviet Bloc to take over most of Europe. The American player has an advantage in naval forces and production, and gradually builds up an invasion force to retake Western Europe.

=== Nuclear option ===
Both players can use nuclear weapons, but immediate mutual destruction is the only possible outcome.

=== Victory conditions ===
Victory is based on how many industrial centers each player owns at the end of the game, most of these located in Western Europe. Critic Nicky Palmer pointed out that "unfortunately most of the map is unused, as the vast majority of winnable objectives are in Western Europe." Palmer recommended that players move some of those industrial centers to South Africa, Australia and Brazil, while making some rule changes to ensure the game is still balanced.

== Scenarios ==
In addition to the main scenario, the game also offers a three-player scenario, where one player takes China and associated allies, although critic Martin Campion pointed out that "China has little to do, and has no chance of winning." There are also two "learning" scenarios, one involving only land-based forces and the other only sea-based forces.

== Publication history ==
World War 3 was designed by Jim Dunnigan, and was published by SPI in 1975 as a boxed set with graphic design by Redmond A. Simonsen. The game sold very well, and was in SPI's Top Ten Bestseller List for eight months following its publication. Five years after its publication, it was still a very popular game. In a 1976 poll conducted by SPI to determine the most popular board wargames in North America, World War 3 placed 80th out of 202 games.

== Reception ==
In Issue 53 of the British magazine Games & Puzzles, Nicky Palmer noted that "some of the political assumptions of the game are decidedly peculiar." Palmer was of two minds about World War 3, saying, "The game is often exciting, especially in the early cliff-hanging 'surprise' turns. It does not, however, give the feel of a titanic global struggle." Palmer concluded by giving the game an Excitement Level of 3 out of 5. Four years later, in his 1980 book The Best of Board Wargaming, Palmer reduced the Excitement grade to 50%.

In Issue 48 of Strategy & Tactics, game designer Richard Berg called the game "Global warfare in the future [...] complex and fairly long."

In The Guide to Simulations/Games for Education and Training, Martin Campion noted that "World War 3 has some problems. [...] the victory conditions give the game to the Western player if he follows the best strategy." However Campion felt this game could be used in the classroom with some rule changes, saying, "The game is unique and susceptible to improvements."

In a retrospective review in Issue 11 of Simulacrum, Luc Olivier commented, "WW3 is actually closer to science fiction and pseudo-history than to a simulation of a next war." Olivier thought "The naval part of the game is certainly the most interesting and the part provoking the most thought." Olivier concluded, "WW3 is an excellent game for a change from formal history, and to understand what real sea power is and global strategies; perhaps old fashioned but with some clever ideas. For its age, this game is a real winner."

== Other reviews and commentary ==
- Moves #15
