= Canadian Civil War (game) =

1977 board wargame

Canadian Civil War (French: Guerre Civil Canadienne) is a board game published by Simulations Publications Inc. (SPI) in 1977 shortly after the separatist Parti Québécois came to power in Quebec under René Lévesque. The game simulates a hypothetical political struggle between factions, some of them seeking to redefine the terms of the Canadian confederation, others seeking to maintain the status quo.

== Background ==
The British North America Act 1867 passed by the British government created Canada as a federation of provinces acting together as an internally self-governing country within the British Empire. The act also defined the powers and responsibilities of the federal government, such as foreign policy, armed forces and customs, as well as those of the provincial governments, such as resources and education.

A century later an independence movement grew in Quebec based on the province's linguistic and cultural differences. Although some sought independence through violence, as exemplified by the militant Front de libération du Québec (FLQ), others felt that independence could be achieved through political means. When the Parti Québécois rose to power in 1976, they promised to bring a referendum to the Quebec voters asking if Quebec should leave the Canadian confederation.

== Description ==
Canadian Civil War is a complex board wargame for three or four players played on a board containing an abstract representation of Canadian political power. Each player controls one of four fictional political parties in Canada:

- Federalist: Wishes to restructure the terms of the Canadian confederation so that the federal government is preeminent over the provincial governments.
- Provincial Moderate: Wants to keep the present federal-provincial arrangement as outlined in the British North America Act.
- Provincial Autonomy: Wants to shift some of the federal powers to the provincial governments.
- Separatist: Wants to restructure Canada into a collection of independent but cooperative states akin to the European Economic Community.

The players define issues and attempt to force and win elections based on those issues. Victory is gained by either defeating those players who openly rebel or by collecting all of the required issues for the scenario being played.

An essay about Canadian history and politics provides the context of the game.

== Publication history ==
The political board game Canadian Civil War was a complete departure for SPI, which up to that time had produced 170 military wargames. Although Vic Baker credits the concept of the game to Terry Hardy of Connecticut, a descendant of United Empire Loyalists, Hardy's name is not mentioned in the game credits, which instead lists company founder Jim Dunnigan as the creator. It was published in 1977 as a boxed set with graphic design by Redmond A. Simonsen. In another break from precedent for SPI, the rules were printed in both French and English for sale in Canada.

The game was not popular in the US, and failed to crack SPI's Top Ten Bestselling Games list, but did sell well in Canada. Twenty years after the game's publication, Dunnigan recalled "SPI did have the dubious distinction of publishing the only US manufactured wargame to sell more copies in Canada than the US. It ... had the additional questionable honor of having the first sample copies seized at the border by Canadians customs officials as 'seditious material.'"

== Reception ==
In Issue 27 of the British wargaming magazine Perfidious Albion, J. Richard Jarvinen commented, "I rate this game as 'Excellent' as it deals nicely and originally with modern day political problems. A few minor problems exist with rules but are not critical."

Vic Baker, writing in the April 1978 issue of Direct Marketing, called it "an intellectual parlor game" and noted it was the first game by an American company that had been specifically designed for the Canadian market.

In Issue 39 of Moves, Canadian critic Norman S. Howe found the idea of National Emergencies "the least realistic facet of the game ... Nothing in Canadian history has ever occurred which resembles the National Emergency." Nevertheless, Howe concluded, "From my Canadian viewpoint, Canadian Civil War is an extremely interesting game, though one with a very limited popular appeal. Unless one is able to identify with the issues involved, the game is essentially meaningless. I suspect that many American gamers would be bored to tears without the historical article accompanying the rule book."

In The Guide to Simulations/Games for Education and Training, Donald C. Davis thought this would be a good game for classroom use, noting that in addition to the given scenarios, "The instruction booklet suggests several ways players can construct scenarios to create their own views of the Canadian political scene."

== Other reviews and commentary ==
- Fire & Movement #23
