= The Next War (board game) =

Hypothetical Cold War board wargame

- Cover art by Redmond A. Simonsen, 1978
- Designers: Jim Dunnigan
- Illustrators: Redmond A. Simonsen
- Publishers: GDW
- Publication: 1978
- Genres: Cold War

The Next War: Modern Conflict in Europe is a board wargame published by Simulations Publications, Inc. (SPI) in 1978 that simulates a hypothetical Warsaw Pact invasion of Western Europe. Critics noted its extreme complexity in lieu of playability.

== Description ==
The Next War is a two-player game in which one player invades Western Europe with Warsaw Pact forces in the late 1970s, while the other player defends with NATO forces. The basic game is used for short scenarios. More complex rules allow for weather, supply lines, chemical or nuclear warfare, air and naval operations, airborne troops, amphibious landings, special forces, and electronic warfare. A campaign game of three scenarios covers the first 60 days after an invasion.

=== Game components ===
The game box contains:

- three 22 in × 35 in (560 mm × 890 mm) map sheets with a scale of 14 kilometres per hex
- a 6 in × 8 in (150 mm × 200 mm) and a 10 in × 12 in (250 mm × 300 mm) map extension
- 2400 die-cut 1/2" counters,
- 32-page rulebook
- 40-page "Scenarios and Situation Briefing" book
- two identical 4-page "Charts & Tables" folders
- Air Allocation Display

== Publication history ==
The Next War was designed by James F. Dunnigan, with artwork and graphic design by Redmond A. Simonsen, and was published by SPI in 1978. The game was a bestseller for SPI. A month before publication, it appeared at number 2 on SPI's Top Ten list just on the basis of preorders. When the game was released in July 1978, it rose to #1 and stayed in SPI's Top Ten for a year.

== Reception ==
In Issue 34 of the British wargaming magazine Perfidious Albion, Charles Vasey and Geoffrey Barnard discussed the game. Vasey commented, "This game has me in a quandary. It's obvious that [designer Jim Dunnigan] has done a lot of work on the subject and has sought to include every possible factor ... The rules are clear if wordy, but the system is too new for me. I found the continuing combat/move was neat but took a hell of a lot of time ... The die modifications took a long time to calculate and really required both gamers working together on them. The result is a clever, thoughtful design which has few holes. It is also mind-blowingly tedious." Barnard replied, "I wish I knew what this package was trying to prove ...As far as I can seem there is no particular reason why the old system would not have worked just as well [as the new system], they would have had the added advantage of being known and understood such that the game was not such damn hard work for so little reward." Vasey concluded, "It's one hell of a simulation, it's a fine piece of work, but I cannot see me ever playing it again." Barnard concluded, "This may (or may not?) be the greatest simulation of all time, but for my money, as a game, it's a dead loss."

In Issue 46 of Moves, Thomas Pratuch noted that "Next War is another 'supergame' from SPI with enough basic and optional rules to keep any gamer studying it for a long time."

In The Guide to Simulations/Games for Education and Training, Richard Rydzel commented, "This is an interesting but complex game. There are so many possible die modifications on attacks that each attack may require ten or fifteen minutes to compute the right odds. Also, keeping track of all the air and antiaircraft units is a burden and subtracts from the game's playability." Ryzdel concluded, "If one wishes to spend the time and effort on this game, it is a good simulation that seems to cover most areas of such conflict."

== Awards ==
At the 1979 Origins Awards, The Next War was a finalist for a Charles S. Roberts Award in two categories: "Best Twentieth Century Game of 1978", and "Best Graphics and Physical Systems of 1978."

== Other reviews ==
- Strategy & Tactics Issue 69 (Jul/Aug 1978)
- The Wargamer Vol. 1 Issue 7 (Oct. 1978) and Issue 9 (Feb. 1979)
- Fire & Movement Issue 15 (Jan/Feb 1979)
- Paper Wars Issue 51 (May/June 2003, p.36)
- Line of Departure Issue 62 (Spring/Summer 2008)
