= Albion (magazine) =

Gaming magazine

Albion is a small press magazine that at first focussed on the game of Diplomacy and later focussed on wargames. It was published from 1969 to 1975 by Don Turnbull.

== Development and publication history ==
Cover art of first issue of Albion by George Forster, 2 July 1969

In the mid-1960s, Don Turnbull became interested in the game of Diplomacy, and specifically in the development of a play-by-mail version. Unlike a play-by-mail chess game, where the two players merely had to alternately send each other the latest move, play-by-mail Diplomacy had seven players who had to reveal their "orders" for each turn simultaneously, which required the orders to be submitted to a neutral referee. In order to facilitate this, Turnbull had the idea of creating a zine dedicated to refereeing Diplomacy games. Each player would mail their orders to him, and he would publish everyone's orders in his zine. In order to reach Diplomacy players in the UK who might be interested in this concept, Turnbull used his American contacts through wargaming circles to borrow a mailing list from the Avalon Hill International Kriegspiel Society (AHIKS). There was enough interest in his concept that Turnbull was able to organize a play-by-mail game, and published the first turn's orders in the first issue of Albion on July 2, 1969. The issue was eight A4 pages long, hand-typed and mimeographed, with cover art by George Forster.

According to Diplomacy Zines, Albion was "the first ever Diplomacy zine published in the UK."

Issues appeared roughly monthly, although occasionally Turnbull would publish two issues in a month. Circulation of the first few issues remained low, less than 30. But by Issue 21, circulation was high enough that Turnbull decided to move the Diplomacy games to another zine titled Courier, while Albion focussed on wargames.

At this time, Ian Livingstone and Steve Jackson lived in the same town as Turnbull, and became acquainted with him via Albion. Starting in May 1971 with Issue 28, Livingstone began to produce covers for some issues of Albion. After Livingstone and Jackson moved to London to start up Games Workshop, they continued to stay in touch with Turnbull.

With other projects taking precedence, the time between issues of Albion became longer and longer. Turnbull finally made the decision to bring publication to an end in January 1975 with Issue 50, which was 109 pages long and featured 17 different articles with three complete games presented in separate supplements.

After the final issue was published, Steve Jackson and Ian Livingstone reached out to Turnbull to use his mailing list to send each Albion subscriber a copy of the first issue of their newsletter Owl and Weasel to solicit their business. After Owl & Weasel morphed into the glossy magazine White Dwarf, Livingstone commissioned Turnbull to write articles.

== Awards ==
At the 1975 Origins Awards, Albion won the first ever Charles S. Roberts Award for Best Amateur Magazine of 1974.

In 2013, UK Games Expo selected Don Turnbull (posthumously) as one of the first five inductees into their Hall of Fame for "almost single-handedly kicking off the gaming 'zine scene with his Diplomacy-focused magazine Albion".
