= Clervaux: Breakout of the 5th Panzer Army =

1978 WWII board wargame

Clerveaux
- Designers: Danny Parker
- Illustrators: Redmond A. Simonsen
- Publishers: SPI
- Publication: 1978
- Genres: WWII

Clervaux: Breakout of the 5th Panzer Army is a board wargame published by Simulations Publications Inc. (SPI) in 1978 that was a part of the Battles for the Ardennes "quadrigame" (four thematically-linked games in one box using the same rules system). Clervaux simulates part of the German surprise attack during the Battle of the Bulge.

== Background ==
In December 1944, after a four-month Allied offensive that had pushed German forces across France and back into Germany, Allied intelligence believed that German forces were close to collapse and were incapable of mounting a counterattack. However, Germany surprised the Allies with Operation Wacht am Rhein, a major offensive through the weakly defended Ardennes. In the southern sector of the assault, the Fifth Panzer Army broke through Allied lines and drove towards Bastogne.

== Description ==
Clervaux is a wargame for two players in which one controls the German forces, and the other controls the Allied forces. The hex grid game map shows the heavily forested terrain of the Ardennes Forest.

=== Gameplay ===
At the start of each game turn, both players determine if all units are supplied. The German player and then the Allied player take the following phases:

1. Construction of fortified positions and demolition of bridges
2. Deploy or move artillery
3. Movement (either convoy mode or normal mode)
4. Combat

Each turn represents 12 hours of the battle, and the game lasts for twelve turns.

=== Supply ===
To be supplied, a unit must be within four hexes of a friendly road (unhindered by enemy units or enemy zones of control) that leads to a friendly edge of the map. If a unit is unsupplied, it moves at half rate and cannot attack, although it can defend itself at its full Strength.

=== Movement ===
All units in supply on a road, not stacked with other units and not in an enemy unit's zone of control, can be placed in convoy mode. This allows mechanized units to move three times their normal speed, while non-mechanized units move at double their normal speed.

=== Victory conditions ===
Both players earn Victory Points for occupying key towns and cities, and for eliminating enemy units. The player with the most Victory Points at the end of the game is the winner.

== Publication history ==
In 1975, SPI published its first quadrigame, Blue & Gray. This proved to be popular, and SPI immediately produced further quadrigames. In 1978, SPI released the quadrigame Battles of the Ardennes featuring three games about the Battle of the Bulge in 1944, including Clervaux, and one game about the German invasion of France in 1940, Sedan, 1940. All the games were designed by Danny Parker, with graphic design by Redmond A. Simonsen. The Ardennes quadrigame proved popular, immediately rising to #6 on SPI's Top Ten Bestseller List, rising as high as #3, and remaining on the list for the next eight months. Each of the four games, including Clervaux, was also released as an individual "folio" game, packaged in an LP-style cardstock folder.

== Reception ==
In his 1980 book The Best of Board Wargaming, Nicky Palmer called Clervaux "the most difficult of the three 1944 folios." Palmer questioned the map terrain, which indicated that Luxembourg was a relatively easy target, pointing out, "it is a fortified town strraddling a gigantic ravine." Palmer also noted that capturing Luxembourg was unlikely to bring victory to the German player, advising, "A straight thrust for Bastogne may be the best chance. Much depends on Allied success in blowing bridges (i.e. luck)." Palmer gave this game an "Excitement" grade of 80%.

In Issue 16 of Fire & Movement, William Sanders commented, "Play is a bit sluggish and tends to become predictable. The victory conditions ... tend to favor the Americans, and the capture of cities and towns as the principal criterion for victory seems ahistorical." Despite this, Sanders concluded, "I have had a lot of fun playing, both winning and losing, and can recommend it.". Eleven years later, in a retrospective review in Issue 65, Jeff Petraska commented, "Game play is fairly simple and straight-forward, with nothing really innovative. However, it's entertaining and offers a lot of variety for the dollar."

In Issue 92 of Campaign, Ty Bomba commented, "Do get this game, all of you. It's a true state of the art masterpiece, which at one swoop has moved Danny Parker to the front ranks of the designer-dom."

In Issue 46 of Moves, Karl Wieger noted "The heavy woods and the rivers dictate the possible avenues of German attack, but the German player has a few options to choose from."

In Issue 26 of the French games magazine Casus Belli, Frederic Armand noted that with progress blocked to the north and the south, "The only solution for the German player may seem to be a front assault on Bastogne, but this assault is not the best way to gain ground because of the woods and difficult terrain that screen Bastogne, the arrival of the American paratroopers, and the combat system." Armand pointed to other options for German units not assaulting Bastogne: push towards Beaufort, or towards Luxembourg, but warned that these would strip units away from the assault on Bastogne. Armand concluded, "The game involves difficult choices for the German player."

== Other reviews and commentary ==
- Strategy & Tactics #71
- Fire & Movement #18 and #20
- The Wargamer Vol.1 #33, and Vol.2 #17
- Campaign #95
- The Grenadier #27
- Zone of Control #4
- Paper Wars #21
- Simulations Canada Newsletter #13
- Wargame News #42
