= Celles: The Battle Before the Meuse =

1978 WWII board wargame

Celles
- Designers: Danny Parker
- Illustrators: Redmond A. Simonsen
- Publishers: SPI
- Publication: 1978
- Genres: WWII

Celles: The Battle Before the Meuse is a board wargame published by Simulations Publications Inc. (SPI) in 1978 that was a part of the Battles for the Ardennes "quadrigame" (four thematically-linked games in one box using the same rules system). Celles simulates part of the German surprise attack during the Battle of the Bulge. Several critics thought Celles was the least interesting of the four games in the Ardennes box.

== Background ==
In December 1944, after a four-month Allied offensive that had pushed German forces across France and back into Germany, Allied intelligence believed that German forces were close to collapse and were incapable of mounting a counterattack. However, Germany surprised the Allies with Operation Wacht am Rhein, a major offensive through the weakly defended Ardennes. As the German attack reached its peak on December 23 with the encirclement of Bastogne, the Fifth Panzer Army left behind what they believed were enough forces to take Bastogne and pushed towards the Meuse River, seeking a breakthrough into the tank-friendly open countryside beyond. However, the interminable overcast that had plagued the Allies for two weeks finally cleared, allowing Allied air power to resume operations. At the same time, German forces started to run out of supplies, especially fuel for their tanks.

== Description ==
Celles is a wargame for two players in which one controls the German forces, and the other controls the Allied forces. The hex grid game map shows the heavily forested terrain of the Ardennes Forest bordered by the Meuse River.

=== Gameplay ===
At the start of each game turn, both players determine if all units are supplied. The German player and then the Allied player take the following phases:

1. Construction of fortified positions and demolition of bridges
2. Deploy or move artillery
3. Movement (either convoy mode or normal mode)
4. Combat

The game lasts for seven turns.

=== Supply ===
To be supplied, a unit must be within four hexes of a friendly road (unhindered by enemy units or enemy zones of control) that leads to a friendly edge of the map. If a unit is unsupplied, it moves at half rate and cannot attack, although it can defend itself at its full Strength.

=== Movement ===
All units in supply on a road, not stacked with other units and not in an enemy unit's zone of control, can be placed in convoy mode. This allows mechanized units to move three times their normal speed, while non-mechanized units move at double their normal speed.

=== Optional scenario ===
A "what-if?" hypothetical variant adds the SS Panzer units to the game that historically had been sent to the Sixth Panzer Army. To balance this, elements of the British XXX Corps are added to the Allied side.

=== Victory conditions ===
Victory is determined by the number of towns and villages the German player is able to occupy by the end of the game: 4 or more means a German victory, while 3 or less is an Allied victory. If, after determining supply for any turn, there are at least three supplied German mechanized units west or north of the Meuse River, the German player wins an immediate victory.

== Publication history ==
In 1975, SPI published its first quadrigame, Blue & Gray. This proved to be popular, and SPI immediately produced further quadrigames. In 1978, SPI released the quadrigame Battles of the Ardennes featuring three games about the Battle of the Bulge, including Celles, and one game, Sedan, 1940, about the German invasion of France. All the games were designed by Danny Parker, with graphic design bn Redmond A. Simonsen. The Ardennes quadrigame proved popular, immediately rising to #6 on SPI's Top Ten Bestseller List, rising as high as #3, and remaining on the list for the next eight months. Each of the four games, including Celles, was also released as an individual "folio" game, packaged in an LP-style cardstock folder.

== Reception ==
In his 1980 book The Best of Board Wargaming, Nicky Palmer called Celles "the poor relation of the [Battles for the Ardennes quadrigame], and definitely not worth buying on its own." Palmer thought the game was merely "A short wrestling match for a few towns in front of the Meuse" and concluded by giving this game an "Excitement" grade of only 20%, saying, "Even though there is more than one possible plan for each side, the game retains a rather 'trivial' feel when divorced from the campaign context.".

In Issue 16 of Fire & Movement, William Sanders commented, "Play is a bit sluggish and tends to become predictable. The victory conditions ... tend to favor the Americans, and the capture of cities and towns as the principal criterion for victory seems ahistorical." Despite this, Sanders concluded, "I have had a lot of fun playing, both winning and losing, and can recommend it.". Eleven years later, in a retrospective review in Issue 65, Jeff Petraska commented, "Game play is fairly simple and straight-forward, with nothing really innovative. However, it's entertaining and offers a lot of variety for the dollar."

In Issue 92 of Campaign, Ty Bomba commented, "Do get this game, all of you. It's a true state of the art masterpiece, which at one swoop has moved Danny Parker to the front ranks of the designer-dom."

In Issue 46 of Moves, Karl Wieger called Celles "the least interesting of the [Ardennes] folio games." Wieger believed the reason for this was "that eleven suitable towns [for German occupation] lie in just one third of the game map, so the action in quite confined." Wieger noted the impossibility of the German player earning an immediate victory by getting mechanized units over the Meuse, pointing out "Not only will it be hard to even reach the Meuse, but crossing would mean the German line is strained to the utmost, and possibly broken. Good luck."

In Issue 26 of the French games magazine Casus Belli, Frédéric Armand called this game "the strangest of the four games [in the Ardennes box]. On the positive side, it is a great game, very short, and the low unit density on the map provides players with plenty of opportunities. No clichéd plan allows you to win Celles; you must constantly adapt to the circumstances: change your line of attack every turn, attack, parry, fall back on guard. Furthermore, Celles appears to be a very balanced game." However, despite its playability, Armand questioned the game's historical accuracy, noting, "The occupation of a few Belgian villages, which serves to determine the winner of this game, would not have changed the course of the [German] offensive, let alone the course of the war." Armand was also not enamored of the optional variant which added extra Panzer units, calling the result even more unrealistic than the basic game, since it would change the entire axis of the German's strategic operation.

== Other reviews and commentary ==
- Strategy & Tactics #71
- Fire & Movement #18 and #20
- The Wargamer Vol.1 #33, and Vol.2 #17
- Campaign #95
- The Grenadier #27
- Zone of Control #4
- Paper Wars #21
- Simulations Canada Newsletter #13
- Wargame News #42
