= The Moscow Campaign =

1972 WWII board wargame

- Designers: Jim Dunnigan
- Illustrators: Redmond A. Simonsen
- Publishers: Simulations Publications Inc.
- Publication: 1977
- Genres: WWII

The Moscow Campaign, subtitled "Strike and Counterstrike Russia", is a board wargame published by Simulations Publications Inc. (SPI) in 1972 that simulates combat near Moscow during World War II.

== Background ==
On 22 June 1941, less than two years after Germany and the Soviet Union signed the non-aggression Molotov–Ribbentrop Pact, Germany attacked the Soviet Union across a wide front, with several strategic goals in mind, including the capture of Moscow. Although the Germans exploited the element of surprise and quickly realized large geographical gains through the summer and fall of 1941, lack of supplies and worsening weather brought the German attack to a halt on the outskirts of Moscow. Soviet forces, bolstered by reinforcements from Siberia, then staged a powerful counteroffensive at the end of 1941.

== Description ==
The Moscow Campaign is a two-player board wargame in which one player controls German forces, and the other player controls the Soviets.

=== Components ===
The game box contains:

- 22" x 34" paper hex grid map scaled at 6 mi (9.6 km) per hex
- 400 die-cut counters
- map-folded rulesheet
- small 6-sided die

=== Gameplay ===
The Moscow Campaign uses the combat system developed for a previous SPI publication, Kursk: Operation Zitadelle. Like most wargames of the time, players start each turn with alternating movement and fire. However, the Kursk system emphasizes the power and mobility of tanks by giving all mechanized units a second movement phase to allow for a breakthrough after successful combat. So the first player has three phases:

1. First Movement (all units)
2. Fire
3. Second Movement (mechanized units only)

The second player then has the same three phases, completing one full turn, which represents 2 days of game time.

==== Zones of control and supplies ====
Zones of control vary, depending on the situation. Most zones of control allow enemy movement through them provided a movement penalty is paid. This allows mechanized units to slip through the enemy line. For the purposes of determining whether a unit is supplied or not, units must be able to trace an unbroken line no more than 12 hexes to supplies, and the supplies themselves must connect to unbroken rail lines. In addition, Russian supply lines cannot be traced back through German zones of control, but German supply lines can be traced back through Russian zones of control. (Thus, a German unit has to be completely surrounded before it is considered unsupplied.)

==== Weather ====
Weather plays a pivotal role in the game, possibly causing long delays for the Germans, and halving German attack strength.

=== Scenarios ===
There are a total of 24 scenarios, with various start and end points and orders of battle during the Moscow campaign. Victory points are awarded for enemy units destroyed, as well as complete supply lines and some geographical objectives.

== Publication history ==
One of SPI's first wargames, and their first tank combat game, was 1971's Kursk: Operation Zitadelle, designed by SPI founder Jim Dunnigan with an innovative second movement impulse for mechanized units. This same system was used by Dunnigan in a series of division-level tank combat games, including The Battle for France, 1940 (1971), Turning Point: The Battle of Stalingrad (1972), Breakout & Pursuit (1972), Destruction of Army Group Center (1973), and The Moscow Campaign.

The Moscow Campaign featured graphic design by Redmond A. Simonsen and was originally packaged in a plain white box with a red title ribbon. In 1974, SPI developed their "flatpack" box with an integrated counter tray, and The Moscow Campaign was re-released in the new-style box.

In a 1976 poll conducted by SPI to determine the most popular board wargames in North America, The Moscow Campaign placed 102nd out of 202 games.

== Reception ==
In Issue 37 of The Pouch, Nicolas Ulanov was unimpressed by this game, calling it "boring and unrealistic" and gave it a rating of only 1 out of 5.

In the 1977 book The Comprehensive Guide to Board Wargaming, Nick Palmer called it "moderately complex" and noted the "detailed map."

Writing for Moves, Perry Moore called it "one of those games (like Panzergruppe Guderian) that can be played endlessly for the excitement of the German sweep into Moscow before the rains and mud come, for the tense battles as time becomes a hindrance to the German, for the continual struggle to maintain supply." Perry concluded, "It is an exciting game for both sides, and the rules are clear and work well."

In The Guide to Simulations/Games for Education and Training, Martin Campion thought that "The game shows the task that Hitler set for his army was nearly impossible. It shows the effect of Russian ability to pour men into the battle, the effect of Russian weather, and the effect of German inability to keep supplies moving as far as the front." Campion concluded, "This is a realistic game but a little too complicated for the amount of realism achieved."

== Other reviews and commentary ==
- Fire & Movement No. 5 & No. 63
- Jagdpanther No. 5

== See also ==
- Moscow '41
