= St. Vith: The Sixth Panzer Army Attack =

1978 WWII board wargame

St. Vith
- Designers: Danny Parker
- Illustrators: Redmond A. Simonsen
- Publishers: SPI
- Publication: 1978
- Genres: WWII

St. Vith: The Sixth Panzer Army Attack is a board wargame published by Simulations Publications Inc. (SPI) in 1978 that was a part of the Battles for the Ardennes "quadrigame" (four thematically linked games in one box using the same rules system). St. Vith simulates a section of the German surprise attack during the Battle of the Bulge.

== Background ==
In December 1944, after a four-month Allied offensive that had pushed German forces across France and back into Germany, Allied intelligence believed that German forces were close to collapse and were incapable of mounting a counterattack. However, Germany surprised the Allies with Operation Wacht am Rhein, a major offensive through the weakly defended Ardennes. The northern part of the attack was carried out by the German Sixth Panzer Army against ill-prepared Allied forces.

== Description ==
St. Vith is a wargame for two players in which one controls the German forces, and the other controls the Allied forces. The hex grid game map shows the heavily forested terrain of the Ardennes Forest.

=== Gameplay ===
At the start of each game turn, both players determine if all units are supplied. The German player and then the French player take the following phases:

1. Construction of fortified positions and demolition of bridges
2. Deploy or move artillery
3. Movement (either convoy mode or normal mode)
4. Combat

During the first turn, to simulate the surprise nature of the German assault, the Allied player cannot move any units.

Each turn represents 12 hours of the battle, and the game lasts for twelve turns.

=== Supply ===
To be supplied, a unit must be within four hexes of a friendly road (unhindered by enemy units or enemy zones of control) that leads to a friendly edge of the map. If a unit is unsupplied, it moves at half rate and cannot attack, although it can defend itself at its full Strength.

=== Movement ===
All units in supply on a road, not stacked with other units and not in an enemy unit's zone of control, can be placed in convoy mode. This allows mechanized units to move three times their normal speed, while non-mechanized units move at double their normal speed.

=== Victory conditions ===
Only the German player earns victory points, and does so by taking key towns and exiting mechanized units off the west edge of the map. If the German player accumulates 11 victory points or more, it is a German victory. Anything less than that means the Allied player wins. If a German mechanized unit reaches any hex of Liege, the German player automatically wins, regardless of their victory point total.

== Publication history ==
In 1975, SPI published its first quadrigame, Blue & Gray. This proved to be popular, and SPI immediately produced further quadrigames. In 1978, SPI released the quadrigame Battles of the Ardennes featuring three games about the Battle of the Bulge, including St. Vith, and one game, Sedan, 1940, about the German invasion of France. All the games were designed by Danny Parker, with graphic design by Redmond A. Simonsen. The Ardennes quadrigame proved popular, immediately rising to #6 on SPI's Top Ten Bestseller List, rising as high as #3, and remaining on the list for the next eight months. Each of the four games, including St. Vith, was also released as an individual "folio" game, packaged in an LP-style cardstock folder.

== Reception ==
In his 1980 book The Best of Board Wargaming, Nicky Palmer noted that "St. Vith recreates the excitement of the situation in the north, with American forces initially stronger than in the south, but increasingly shaky as the days pass." Palmer gave this game an "Excitement" grade of 75%, concluding, "Another finely-balanced game [from the Ardennes quadrigame] ... the Germans are on the offensive for most of the time, but delayed by their slow artillery."

In Issue 16 of Fire & Movement, William Sanders commented, "Play is a bit sluggish and tends to become predictable. The victory conditions ... tend to favor the Americans, and the capture of cities and towns as the principal criterion for victory seems ahistorical." Despite this, Sanders concluded, "I have had a lot of fun playing, both winning and losing, and can recommend it.". Eleven years later, in a retrospective review in Issue 65, Jeff Petraska commented, "Game play is fairly simple and straight-forward, with nothing really innovative. However, it's entertaining and offers a lot of variety for the dollar."

In Issue 92 of Campaign, Ty Bomba commented, "Do get this game, all of you. It's a true state of the art masterpiece, which at one swoop has moved Danny Parker to the front ranks of the designer-dom."

In Issue 46 of Moves, Karl Wieger noted "The heavy woods and the rivers dictate the possible avenues of German attack, but the German player has a few options to choose from."

In Issue 26 of the French games magazine Casus Belli, Frederic Armand noted, "The German player must quickly reduce St. Vith if he hopes to win the game in time." However, Armand noted the Germans are aided by the first turn rule that does not allow the Allied units to move, pointing out, "The progress of the German troops is thus considerably accelerated, and this allows them to cross the Our in the south in the first turn and secure the bridges. And to the north, to advance as far as possible, to surround the adventurous American units and then destroy them."

== Other reviews and commentary ==
- Strategy & Tactics #71
- Fire & Movement #18 and #20
- The Wargamer Vol.1 #33, and Vol.2 #17
- Campaign #95
- The Grenadier #27
- Zone of Control #4
- Paper Wars #21
- Simulations Canada Newsletter #13
- Wargame News #42
