= Chinese Civil War (wargame) =

1979 board wargame

Cover of boxed edition, 1984

Chinese Civil War is a board wargame by World Wide Wargames (3W) in 1979 that simulates the Chinese Civil War between the Kuomintang of Chiang Kai-shek and the Communists of Mao Zedong.

== Description ==
Chinese Civil War is a two-player board wargame where one player controls the Kuomintang, and the other player controls the Communists.

=== Gameplay ===
The game uses an alternating "I Go, You Go" system where the first player adds reinforcements, moves and attacks, then the second player has the same opportunities, completing one game turn.

Communists start as guerillas, which negatively affects their combat but allows them to infiltrate by ignoring Kuomintang zones of control. The Communist player can choose to switch to conventional warfare at any time, but they then lose their infiltration ability.

To simulate the fragmented and fractious nature of the Kuomintang, the game starts with China divided into regions, each of which has a Kuomintang warlord and headquarters. If a Kuomintang unit leaves its original region, it cannot stack with other Kuomintang units in the new region. If the number of Kuomintang units in a region drops below the "garrison level" of the region (usually 3 units) then the Communists gain a free base. To further simulate the Kuomintang organizational problems, the Kuomintang player must roll a die before each attack. If a 6 is rolled, the attack does not take place.

The Kuomintang are also dependent on supply units to attack. These start at the southern edge of the map, and only provide supplies to units within two hexes. In order to attack in the north, the Kuomintang player must move supply units to the front lines either by rail, or by moving them to a more northern port.

Victory points are awarded for each city held at the end of the game, which lasts 18 turns.

== Publication history ==
Chinese Civil War was designed by Bob Fowler, and appeared as a free pull-out game in Issue 10 of The Wargamer in 1979. 3W then released it as a boxed set in 1984.

== Reception ==
In Issue 79 of Strategy & Tactics, game designer Richard Berg was not impressed, noting, "The Wargamer has picked some interesting subjects; I only wish they’d devise some interesting systems to fit."

In Issue 4 of Zone of Control, Grayde Bowen called Chinese Civil War "an interesting game with some different choices." Bowen liked the "truly splendid map", but found the rules poorly laid out and poorly explained. He pointed out the difficulty facing the Communist player, saying, "Attacking is not always a good idea for the Communists but if they don’t attack they will never win." Bowen made some suggestions for improving the game, commenting "The game length and KMT commander reliability would be better treated by a random events table than by using a roll of 6 and a set length of game. Also the number of Communist recruits could be linked to success rather than time."

In Issue 22 of Paper Wars, Michael Lin and Rich Erwin called the game "challenging, unpredictable, and quite an experience. If nothing else, the game is high on the exotic scale."

In Issue 77 of the UK magazine Games & Puzzles, Nicky Palmer noted, "The rules are generally unambiguous but not well organised. Playtesting seems to have been done thoroughly, but there are still a couple of odd points left." Palmer concluded by giving the game an Excitement grade of 4 out of 5, saying, "All in all, though, quite a bargain for Wargamer readers and worth considering for separate purchase."
