= El Alamein: Battles in North Africa, 1942 =

El Alamein: Battles in North Africa, 1942 is a board wargame published by Simulations Publications Inc. (SPI) in 1973 that simulates the final four months (July–October 1942) of the North African campaign during World War II.

== Background ==
British forces had initially enjoyed a considerable success against Italian forces in North Africa in 1941. However, that changed after the arrival of the Afrika Korps under the command of Erwin Rommel, who launched an offensive against the Allies, defeating them at Gazala in June 1942 and capturing Tobruk. The Axis advance was stopped in July 1942 only 140 kilometers (90 mi) from Alexandria in the First Battle of El Alamein. At the end of August 1942, Axis forces made a second attempt to break through the Allied defenses at the Battle of Alam Halfa, but were unsuccessful. The Allies counterattacked in October 1942, decisively defeating the Italian-German army in the Second Battle of El Alamein.

== Description ==
El Alamein is a two-player game in which one player controls the Allies, and the other player controls the Axis. The game uses the "Kursk" game system, first developed for Kursk: Operation Zitadelle (1971), a traditional "I Go, You Go" alternating turn system for movement and combat:

- Initial Movement Phase
- Combat Phase
- Mechanized Movement Phase
- Supply Movement Phase

When one player and then the other has completed these phases, it marks the end of a turn, which is 1 day in game time.

=== Components ===
The game includes:

- 22" x 32" paper hex grid map scaled at 5 km (3 mi) per hex
- 255 die-cut counters
- map-folded rules sheet
- player aids and charts
- errata sheets (dated 31 July 1973)
- small six-sided die

=== Scenarios ===
The game comes with three scenarios, representing the three major battles of the North African Campaign:

- First Battle of El Alamein (July 1942, seven turns)
- Battle of Alam Halfa (August 1942, seven turns)
- Second Battle of El Alamin (October 1942, fifteen turns)

The game also includes 12 variant Orders of Battle, which act as a "what if?" factor when coupled with any of the scenarios.

== Publication history ==
El Alamein was designed by Jim Dunnigan, with graphic design by Redmond A. Simonsen. It was published by SPI in 1973 in a plain white box with a red title ribbon, then re-issued in SPI's plastic "flatbox". It was not a popular game; in a 1977 poll undertaken by SPI to determine the most popular wargames on the market in North America, El Alamein placed a dismal 179th out of 202 games. As Nicholas Palmer noted, the game was "Unenthusiastically received."

== Reception ==
In his 1977 book The Comprehensive Guide to Board Wargaming, Nicholas Palmer commented on the "rather blank map" of the desert, and noted the "detailed supply system" which added some complexity to the game.

In Moves #18, Mark Saha admitted that "El Alamein is not a popular game and is not likely to become one." He then took the game apart to establish why players should be interested in playing it. He concluded "The three scenarios in sequence give an excellent picture of what happened at El Alamein and why the war lost its mobile nature there, for those interested in this campaign. A game designer or collector will find here a fascinating study in how current design techniques are magnificently adapted to the unique demands of a specific situation"

== Other reviews and commentary ==
- Panzerfaust #54 & #68
- Fire & Movement #10 & #60
- JagdPanther #9
- Strategy & Tactics #40
