= Bloody Buna =

Board wargame published in 1986

Cover of The Wargamer No. 9, containing Bloody Buna

Bloody Buna is a board wargame published by the British wargame publisher World Wide Wargames (3W) in 1972 that simulates the New Guinea Campaign between Japanese and Allied forces during World War II. The game is notable for being the only board wargame published in the 20th century that focused on the war in New Guinea.

== Background ==
In 1942, the Japanese High Command decided that to isolate Australia, they would capture the airfields of Port Moresby in Papua New Guinea to use them as a forward air base against Australia. In July 1942, Japanese amphibious forces landed on the north coast of Papua New Guinea. They moved inland towards Port Moresby, having to traverse the dense rainforest of the Owen Stanley Mountains. The only defence available was under-trained Australian militia, nicknamed "Chocos" because they were expected to melt like chocolate in the heat of battle against the jungle-trained Japanese forces. But unexpectedly, the Chocos managed to slow the Japanese advance to a crawl, making time for Australian Imperial forces to arrive. Slowly the Australians began to roll the Japanese forces back through the mountains. The Japanese tried a flanking maneuver near Milne Bay but were repulsed by a joint Australian-American force. Tropical diseases such as dengue fever, malaria and dysentery plagued both sides, with one Australian battalion losing a quarter of their strength to disease in one month.

== Description ==
Bloody Buna is a two-player wargame where one player controls the Japanese forces, and the other player controls the Australian and American forces. Critic John Kula noted that as of 2000, this was the only board wargame that focused on the jungle war in Papua New Guinea.

=== Gameplay ===
The game system uses an alternating "I Go, You Go" series of turns in which one player moves and attacks, followed by the other player. This completes one game turn, which represents one day of game time. The game has 192 cardstock counters and a hex grid map of Papua New Guinea.

In addition to rules for movement, combat and supply, there are also rules for air superiority, airlifts, off-board movement, sea movement and armored combat.

To simulate the dangers of forcing a path through the jungle, both sides face attritional losses if units leave the forest paths and try to cut through the jungle.

The game comes with three scenarios simulating each phase of the New Guinea Campaign:

- Milne Bay: The initial landing by Japanese forces.
- High Water Mark: Can the Japanese reach the airfields?
- Bloody Buna: Allied forces converge on the Japanese.

A campaign game links all three scenarios together.

== Publication history ==
Bloody Buna was designed by Bob Latter and published by 3W as a free pull-out game in Issue 9 of their house magazine The Wargamer. 3W also released a boxed version of the game.

== Reception ==
In the 1980 book The Best of Board Wargaming, Jack Greene liked the components, commenting, "the superb mapsheet is one of the most beautiful ever printed." He felt the game was "excellent at pointing out supply and movement problems in the jungles of New Guinea, the superb training for jungle warfare of the Japanese army, and the quality of Australian forces facing it [...] Not only does it show the problems and careful planning needed for jungle warfare, but it is also an excellent fighting game." He warned that "Fighting withdrawals by either side are critical in slowing down the advances over the Owen Stanley mountains. Usually there follows a key battle at the edge of the mountains and then the final struggles for Buna or Port Moresby, with wild cards of sea and air landing operations." Greene concluded by giving the game an "Excitement" grade of 90%, saying, "Highly recommended."

In Issue 15 of Paper Wars, Guy Van Rossum found a lot to like, writing, "Bloody Buna is a rare beast. It's an obscure, well-designed game on an obscure, interesting battle." Van Rossum thought there was the germ of a good game here, but what was needed was a complete overhaul of the game system, concluding, "It's time to see this game revamped for the hardcore wargamer and reissued."

In a retrospective review in Issue 6 of Simulacrum, John Kula did not think that enough playtesting had been done before publication, noting, "The game is weak in development, marred by errata in the charts, the set up and the scenarios as well as the rules [...] Frankly, trying to keep track of all the errata, corrections, exceptions and game clauses is not worth the bother for an evening of fun gaming. This is too bad, as the game map is a wonder to behold — it really puts you in the jungle mood." He warned that "Once off the trails, units tend to evaporate in effectiveness. Save the off-trail gambits for the few sure advances." Kula concluded that Bloody Buna would not interest the average wargamer, saying, "For those interested in studying the New Guinea campaign beyond the historical commentaries, this game will be a valuable asset. As a game for enjoyment, it is not recommended. [...] Bloody Buna is unique, but not recommended for the quick to please crowd."

== Other reviews and commentary ==
- Fire & Movement #71
- Strategy & Tactics #29 and #65
