= Destruction of Army Group Center =

Board wargame published in 1973

- Designers: Jim Dunnigan
- Illustrators: Redmond A. Simonsen
- Publishers: Simulations Publications Inc.
- Publication: 1973
- Genres: WWII

Destruction of Army Group Center, subtitled "The Soviet Summer Offensive, 1944" and often shortened to DAGC, is a board wargame published by Simulations Publications Inc. (SPI) in 1973 that simulates Operation Bagration, the June 1944 Soviet offensive during World War II that shattered the German line and marked the start of Germany's long retreat back to Berlin and the end of the war.

== Background ==
Germany invaded the Soviet Union in 1941 (Operation Barbarossa), and initially made wide and deep territorial gains. By 1943 the offense had been stopped, and a Soviet counterattack left the Germans on the defensive, with an exposed salient in Byelorussia defended by Army Group Center. In the summer of 1944, the Soviets launched twin offensives that simultaneously attacked both flanks of the salient, attempting to encircle and destroy the German defenders.

== Description ==
DAGC is a two-player game in which one player controls the Soviet forces attempting to encircle and destroy the German defenders, and the other player controls the Germans trying to bring the Soviet offensive to standstill.

=== Components ===
The game includes:

- 22" x 28" paper hex grid map scaled at 16 km (10 mi) per hex
- 8-page map-folded rulesheet
- 200 die-cut counters

=== Scenarios ===
The game includes four scenarios:

- The historical scenario in which the Germans are trying to defend a large salient and must hold their ground as per Hitler's "no retreat" order for at least one turn.
- Three non-historical "what-if" scenarios which ask what would have happened if the Germans had ignored Hitler's order and withdrawn from the salient a) a bit, b) a lot, and c) completely. Each one progressively shortens and strengthens the German line.

=== Gameplay ===
DAGC uses the rules introduced in 1971's Kursk: Operation Zitadelle that use an alternating "I Go, You Go" system of turns. However, new asymmetrical supply rules are used: each German unit must trace an unobstructed path to a rail line that has an unobstructed path to the western edge of the map. The Soviet units must trace an unobstructed path to one of three Supply Terminals that must have an unobstructed path to a rail line that has a path to the eastern edge of the map.

=== Victory conditions ===
Victory is solely based on the number of enemy units destroyed, not on any geographical gains.

== Publication history ==
In 1971–72, SPI published a series of five divisional World War II land combat games that used essentially the same game system: France '40 (1971), Kursk: Operation Zitadelle (1971), Turning Point: The Battle of Stalingrad (1972), The Moscow Campaign (1972), and Breakout & Pursuit (1972). Destruction of Army Group Center, designed by Jim Dunnigan, with graphic design by Redmond A. Simonsen, was the sixth game in this series. It was published as a pull-out game in Strategy & Tactics #36 in 1973, and was published as a boxed set later the same year.

DAGC was not a top seller for SPI nor particularly popular. In a 1977 poll carried out by SPI to determine the most popular wargames on the market in North America, DAGC placed a dismal 159th out of 202 games.

After the demise of SPI, Decision Games acquired the rights to the game. Ty Bomba revised the rules, and a second edition with cover art by Larry Hoffman was published in 2009 as a pullout game in World at War #6.

== Reception ==
Reviewers generally felt that the game was predictable, too unbalanced in favor of the Soviets, and therefore lacked excitement or drama.

In his 1977 book The Comprehensive Guide to Board Wargaming, Nick Palmer called the game "something of a slogging match without much chance to change strategies after the initial deployment." He noted the "simple, smooth-running game system" but concluded it was "a good game for beginners, but experienced players tend to find it lacks variety."

In Issue 11 of Moves, Martin Campion called the game "fairly simple for the Russians in the historical game in which the German is set up in his original salient and is required to obey Hitler's order to stand fast (for the first turn)." Campion didn't think the "what-if" scenarios designed to avoid this predictable outcome helped, saying "The result is varied." He believed this game did not compare well to the previous five SPI games in the Eastern Front series, and concluded that it "can be mildly recommended to historians and gamers although the situation simply lacks the drama inherent in its predecessors."

In Moves #13, John Michael Young noted that DAGC was the sixth game in SPI's series about the Eastern Front, and criticized it for lack of originality, saying, "People are no longer satisfied with a given game system that simply changes the values on the counters. They expect some innovation [...] DAGC fails at this. It is, in effect, the oleomargarine of this game system. It is a played-out system on a seriously imbalanced situation with none of the developmental frills which could have saved it. It is a good example of the overly clear game that is too simple."

In a review written four years after the publication of DAGC, Friedrich Helfferich commented that the game "never really caught on and has by now been dropped by SPI. Nevertheless, the game has redeeming qualities; it is cleaner than Moscow Campaign, its situation is not without challenge, and neither side is as hamstrung as in the latter game."

== Other reviews and commentary ==
- Fire & Movement #63
- Panzerfaust #65
- Panzerschreck #14
