= The Game of France, 1940 =

World War II board wargame published in 1971

Cover of Strategy & Tactics #27, which contained SPI's original edition of "The Battle for France, 1940"

The Game of France, 1940: German Blitzkrieg in the West, originally titled "The Battle for France, 1940", is a board wargame originally published by Simulations Publications Inc. (SPI) in 1971 that was subsequently re-issued by Avalon Hill in 1972. Both editions simulate the World War II Battle of France in 1940, when the German blitzkrieg offensive overwhelmed French and British defenses in northern France.

== Background ==
Although war had been declared in September 1939 between Germany on one side and France and England on the other, no major clashes occurred until May 1940, when German forces invaded Belgium and the Netherlands. When British and French forces advanced to intervene in Belgium, German mechanized units unexpectedly struck through the lightly defended Ardennes region using blitzkrieg tactics, flanking the Allied forces and pushing them back against the sea.

== Description ==
France 1940 is a two-player game in which one player controls the Allied defenders while the other player controls the German invaders. The game uses the standard alternating "I Go, You Go" turn system of combat and movement developed for SPI's 1971 game Kursk: Operation Zitadelle, with each turn representing two days of game time.

=== Components ===
The original SPI ziplock bag edition includes:

- 22" x 24" paper hex grid map scaled at 12.5 km (7.75 mi) per hex
- 224 die-cut counters
- map-folded rules sheet
- various charts and player aids

In the Avalon Hill boxed edition, the paper map has been replaced with a 3-section mounted map, and a six-sided die is included.

=== Scenarios ===
The historical scenario, which inevitably leads to an overwhelming German victory, is titled "The Idiot's Game." Several other non-historical "what if?" scenarios are included that are more balanced.

Box cover of Avalon Hill edition, 1972

== Publication history ==
The Battle for France, 1940 was one of SPI's first products, designed by Jim Dunnigan, with graphic design by Redmond A. Simonsen. It appeared as a pull-out game in Strategy & Tactics #27. Avalon Hill immediately bought the rights to the game, retitled it The Game of France, 1940: German Blitzkrieg in the West (also known as just France 1940), and published it as a slip-cover boxed game in 1972. The game proved to be reasonably popular, and in a 1977 poll conducted by Avalon Hill to determine their most popular products, The Game of France, 1940 ranked #10 out of 25 Avalon Hill games.

== Reception ==
In the 1977 book The Comprehensive Guide to Board Wargaming, Nicholas Palmer pointed out "The problem in designing a game on the fall of France is that anything resembling the historical collapse will fail to appeal to the French player." Palmer thought that the extra scenarios included with this game dealt with that problem reasonably well, but concluded with a warning that the rules were "quite difficult.""

In Issue 4 of Moves, Jeff Schramek noted that the German side was missing a mechanized unit that had, historically, been present. He also noted problems with the supply and air power rules, and suggested several changes to deal with those.

In A Player's Guide to Table Games, John Jackson called this "a poor game defended as a good simulation. In fact it falls on its face on both counts." Jackson thought the issue was Jim Dunnigan's basic design, saying, "Dunnigan wanted a repeat of the German victory and he got it by grossly, and grotesquely, unbalancing the game." He concluded, "By playing around with the variables long enough, you can manage to come up with something you can live with, but what's the point? With one or two hundred alternatives, who needs a bad game and an inaccurate simulation?"

In a retrospective review in Issues 16 and 17 of Simulacrum, John Best compared 1971's The Game of France, 1940 to Blitzkrieg 1940, a board wargame designed 25 years later by Ty Bomba and published by XTR. Best found the Combat Results Table in France, 1940 too large and complex, and play was not as fluid as the newer game. He also preferred a game mechanic in the newer Blitzkrieg 1940 that prevented Allies from entering the Ardennes at the start of the game, meaning "the Germans are free to wreak havoc on the unsuspecting French. The [Avalon Hill] game has nothing to match this. As the Germans in that game, you can enter the Ardennes on turn one, and get through it pretty quickly too. But the Allies can also enter the Forest, and move through it with the same speed, which seems ahistorical to me." Best also found the paratrooper rules in the older France 1940 too detailed and complex. Despite all of these negatives, Best found that "the Avalon Hill game played in a fraction of the time of the XTR game." Best concluded, "There were some things I liked about the Avalon Hill game: it reminded me of my 1970 VW Beetle in that it started and it got you there. In that sense, there was nothing wrong with the game; it seemed like a good fit between the model and the situation, and maybe you could learn something about the campaign by playing the game. The idea of the paper time machine seems very salient in this game: it seems designed to show you what happened, and within the restrictions of the format, why it happened."

== Other reviews and commentary ==
- JagdPanther #2, #7, #12 and #14
- Panzerfaust #53, #54, #55, #59 and #65
- Conflict #5
- Battle Flag Vol.1 #23
- Bushwhacker #3
- Campaign #72 and #83
- Conflict #5
- Fire & Movement #65
- Grenadier #14
- International Wargamer Vol.5 #5
- Jeux & Stratégie #13
- Panzerfaust #52
