= Breakout & Pursuit: The Battle for France, 1944 =

Board wargame published in 1972

Breakout & Pursuit: The Battle for France, 1944 is a board wargame published by Simulations Publications Inc. (SPI) in 1972 that simulates the breakout of Allied forces from Normandy during World War II, and their subsequent pursuit of retreating German forces.

== Background ==
In the weeks following the Allied D-Day landings in June 1944, German forces successfully contained the Allies inside Normandy. In late July 1944, the German line cracked in several places. After the Allies encircled and captured 50,000 Germans near Falaise, the remainder of the German forces retreated across France, pursued by the Allies, in a race for German border at the Rhine River. During the pursuit, the Allies were constantly hampered by supply issues — lacking a large harbor until they could capture Antwerp, all the men, fuel, food and ammunition necessary to maintain their offensive had to be landed at the Normandy beaches and transported across northern France.

== Description ==
Breakout & Pursuit is a two-player wargame in which one player controls the German forces and the other the Allied forces. The game covers the period from late July 1944 to early September in two scenarios:

1. Breakout: A nine-turn scenario in which the Allies try to breach the Germans' Normandy defenses.
2. Pursuit: A seven-turn scenario in which the German player tries to delay the Allied advance across France long enough for German units to escape across the Rhine.

Both can be combined into a 16-turn campaign game. There are also a number of "what if?" scenarios that change the Orders of Battle and several other factors.

There is an emphasis on the logistical problems faced by the Allies during the pursuit phase as they attempt to supply units racing eastward away from the coast with the massive amounts of fuel, food and ammunition needed to continue the offensive.

=== Gameplay ===
This game uses the movement and combat system developed for SPI's previous publication Kursk: Operation Zitadelle, The first player has three phases:

1. Move all units
2. Combat
3. Move armored units again

The second player then has the same three phases, completing one Game Turn, which represents three days.

== Publication history ==
In 1971, while Jim Dunnigan was designing Kursk: Operation Zitadelle, he decided to customize the standard "movement/combat" sequence that had been used by board wargames for the past decade by adding an extra move for armored units following combat. Dunnigan used the Kursk mechanics to design Breakout & Pursuit, which was published by SPI in 1972.

== Reception ==
In Issue 11 of Moves, Martin Campion found the "Breakout" scenario physically very difficult due to the large numbers of counters in a small area: "Normandy is so packed with sometimes interlocking units of friend and foe and the allied troops are in three high stacks three deep behind the line. Even people normally endowed with serviceable fingernails go insane trying to manipulate the situation." Campion also found the game strongly unbalanced in favor of the Allies, saying, "The trouble is that the conclusion seems to be foregone." Campion concluded, "Many of the game's rules and mechanics are quite fresh and realistic, particularly those on supply; but the whole is mildly disappointing at this point."

Writing for The Pouch, Nicholas Ulanov thought the game was "A good and fast blitzkrieg type game." But Ulanov noted it was unbalanced in favour of the Americans, saying, "It's only fun for the USA." Ulanov concluded by giving the game a rating of 2.5 out of 4.

In a 1976 poll conducted by SPI to determine the most popular board wargames in North America, Breakout & Pursuit was rated 93rd out of 202 games.

In his 1977 book The Comprehensive Guide to Board Wargaming, Nick Palmer noted that although the title "suggests some revolting abstract game", the game did deal with the Battle for France in 1944. He warned players that the D-Day landings were not covered by this game. He also noted the "emphasis on Allied logistical problems."

In a retrospective review almost 35 years after the game's publication, Brian Train noted in Simulacrum #24 that the game features a large number of "chrome" (optional) rules but that they "did not seriously get in the way of play." He also liked the "wide variety of alternative orders or battle, deployment plans, and 'what-if' schemes to allow for variations on play."

== Other reviews and commentary ==
- American Wargamer Vol.1 #2
- Fire & Movement #65
