= Africa Orientale =

WW2 board wargame

- Cover of Strategy & Tactics #128, which included Africa Orientale as free game
- Designers: Jeff Brown
- Illustrators: Leslie Freeland; Larry Hoffman
- Publishers: 3W
- Publication: 1989
- Genres: World War II

Africa Orientale (Italian: East Africa) is a board wargame published by 3W in 1989 that simulates the war between Italian and British forces for control of Italian East Africa during World War II.

== Background ==
In 1936, following the annexation of Ethiopa by Italy, Italian dictator Benito Mussolini proclaimed the formation of Italian East Africa, consisting of Ethiopia and the colonies of Italian Eritrea and Italian Somaliland. In 1940, after the start of World War II, Italian forces pushed into British Somaliland and enjoyed some success, forcing the withdrawal of British forces, but at the cost of many Italian casualties, much fuel and ammunition expenditure and wear and tear on vehicles, all of which were difficult to replace. From that point, the Italians were on the defensive, and the British and their allies slowly began to push the Italian forces back.

== Description ==
Africa Orientale is a board wargame for two players; one controls Italian forces, the other Allied forces. Components include 200 counters, a 22" x 34" hex grid map, and a 24-page rulebook.The game is designed to use the standard rules for the Europa wargame series, with some new rules added for the specialities of the African campaign. For example, each turn still represents half a month, which is standard for Europa board games, but to account for the vast distances required on the map, the map scale has been reduced from the Europa standard of 16 miles/51 kilometres per hex to 32 mi/102 km.

== Publication history ==
The first Europa wargame, Drang Nach Osten!, was published by Game Designers' Workshop in 1973 with the avowed aim of creating a series of wargames with interlocking maps that would eventually cover the entirety of World War II in Europe. Although GDW went out of business before the project could be completed, various other publishers took up the challenge.

In 1989, Jeff Brown used the Europa rules to design a simulation of the East African campaign. The result, Africa Orientale, was published as a free pull-out game in Issue 128 of 3W's house magazine Strategy & Tactics.

== Reception ==
In Issue 28 of the Australian wargaming magazine Queensland Wargamer, Jack Ford liked the game because "it is the only Europa game where the Italians have a fighting chance against the Allies." However, Ford felt the game was incomplete: "The map does not include the important Horn of Africa. This is not the kind of omission that would normally be left out of a Europa game." Despite this, Ford concluded, "Overall, Africa Orientale is an enjoyable game which is balanced so that either the Allies or the Axis player could win depending on how they play."

The General Staff Archives noted that in a well-planned game, Italian defeat is inevitable: "The Italians have an impressive array of forces at their disposal - at least on paper. Cut off, however, from Italy and any support, supply or even spare parts, it was always a question of when and not if the Italian defeat would finally materialize."

== Other reviews and commentary ==
- Moves #67
- Europa #36
