= Kursk (board game) =

1980 WWII board wargame

- Original 1980 box cover
- Designers: Eric Goldberg (game designer)
- Illustrators: Redmond A. Simonsen
- Publishers: Simulations Publications Inc.
- Publication: 1980
- Genres: WWII

Kursk: History's Greatest Tank Battle, July 1943 is a board wargame published by Simulations Publications Inc. (SPI) in 1980 that simulates the 1943 Battle of Kursk during World War II. The game proved popular, reaching the top of SPI's Bestseller list, and was well received by critics.

== Background ==
In July 1943, the German summer offensive in Russia ran into a strongly defended Russian tank army near the city of Kursk. Nearly 1400 tanks and assault guns were involved in what became known as the largest tank battle in history, resulting in the destruction of almost 300 tanks on each side. Although the Russians withdrew, the battle was the final strategic offensive that the Germans were able to launch on the Eastern Front. A month later, the Russians launched a counteroffensive that marked the slow German retreat back to Berlin and the end of the war.

== Description ==
Kursk is a tactical wargame for two players (or two teams) that covers various aspects of the battle. Three scenarios are provided:

- Von Manstein's Plan (May 1943): A "what if" scenario based on the original plan of attack that should have happened two months earlier, before the Russians were dug in.
- Hitler's Plan (July 1943): The historical battle.
- The Beginning of the End: The Soviet Summer Counteroffensive, 1 August 1943: The attack that would signal the start of the German retreat back to Berlin by 1945.

=== Components ===
The boxed set contains:

- 22" x 34" hex grid map of the area around Kursk, scaled at 10 km (6.2 mi) per hex
- 600 counters
- 25-page rulebook
- deployment charts for both players

=== Setup ===
For the historical scenario, the Russian player sets out their infantry and tank units first, followed by the German player. Then the Russian player adds their artillery and anti-tank units.

=== Gameplay ===
Each turn has the following phases:

- Air War (optional rule)
- German player
  - Administrative: Player decides in which of three modes to place every unit:
    - Assault (attacks twice per turn but half-movement and cannot over-run)
    - Mobile (full movement and can over-run, but only attacks once per turn)
    - Static (better defense, but cannot attack and can only take half-movement)
  - Movement: In addition to regular movement, the active player can move five units per turn on railways
  - Combat: After artillery has fired, there are two opportunities in the Combat phase to attack, once for Assault and Mobile units, and a second time for Assault units.
  - Mechanized Movement
  - Disruption Removal
  - Organization: Replacements arrive, units can be broken down and reorganized, etc.
- The Russian player then repeats the same phases that the German player had.

=== Victory conditions ===
Both players gain victory points for destroying enemy units and capturing objectives. In addition, the German player receives a victory point for every Russian reserve unit that is activated. The player with the most points at the end of the scenario is the winner.

== Publication history ==
In 1971, SPI published Kursk: Operation Zitadelle, a game about combat at Kursk on a single day. BoardGameGeek claims it was the first to simulate even part of this battle.

Nine years later, SPI decided to revisit the battle in greater detail, and Brent Nosworthy began to design a game based on the rules used in SPI's 1976 game set on the Eastern Front, Panzergruppe Guderian. The new Kursk project was eventually taken over by Eric Goldberg, who designed a game with a new rules system that covered the entire battle including the Russian counter-offensive in August. Jim Dunnigan led the game development, and Redmond A. Simonsen provided the graphic design.

The game proved to be a bestseller, entering SPI's Top Ten Bestseller list as soon as it was published in March 1980. It continued to gain in popularity, and by July was #1 on the Top Ten list.

After the demise of SPI, Six Angles acquired the license for this game and published a Japanese language version in 2006 with cover art by Masahiro Yamasaki.

== Reception ==
In Issue 36 of Phoenix, Paul Evans liked the "impressive amount of detail and realism", and thought it was "a good simulation of the game". But he found that "the game plays slowly. The Russians cannot afford many mistakes, and no major ones. The German is always looking for the best advantage; so each turn is full of planning and pondering." He concluded that, despite the game's many strengths, "I find it a bit dull. It somehow lacks that spark that arouses and captures the interest."

In Issue 51 of Moves, Thomas Hudson found the amount of historical research to be "staggering". He did note that the game set up was arduous, and also that it was a slow game, saying, "Kursk is not a game with lightning penetration and deep thrusts; it does reward the careful planner [...] In our game we spent a good two hours on each game turn, probably the norm for even experienced players." He concluded with some ambivalence: "Kursk is not a game to approach lightly; it is akin to a monster game even though it has but one map [...] Nor can Kursk be recommended for those that are put off by complexity. For those who do not mind the complexity and have a large chunk of time to invest in it, the game can be vastly rewarding."

In Issue 58 of Moves, Bob Malin spent more than one hundred hours playing the game, but in the end was left with mixed feelings. Malin found the game unbalanced in favor of the Germans. He felt that if the game was supposed to simulate the world's largest tank battle, it should have had a bigger map and more counters. He concluded, "Kursk is an enigma, both the battle and the game. Historically it should never have happened, yet did; the game looks as if it should work, yet does not come off."

== Awards ==
At the 1981 Charles S. Roberts Awards, Kursk was a finalist for "Best Twentieth Century Game of 1980".

== Other reviews ==
- Fire & Movement #5 & #63
- International Wargamer Vol.5, #4
- JagdPanther #12
- Strategy & Tactics Guide to Conflict Simulation Games, Periodicals, and Publications #1
- The Wargamer Vol. 1, #15
