= The East is Red: The Sino Soviet War =

The East Is Red: The Sino Soviet War is a board wargame published by Simulations Publications Inc. (SPI) in 1974 that simulates a hypothetical invasion of Manchuria and North China by Russia using 1970s armaments.

== Description ==
The East Is Red is a two-player game in which one player controls the Russian invaders, and the other player controls Chinese defenders.

=== Components ===
The game includes:

- 22" × 34" paper hex grid map scaled at 50 km (31 mi) per hex
- rulesheet
- 100 die-cut counters

=== Gameplay ===
The East Is Red uses an alternating system of "I Go, You Go" turns, movement and combat first developed by SPI for Kursk: Operation Zitadelle (1971).

=== Victory conditions ===
Victory is based solely based on how many Chinese industrial centers the Russians capture: 22 or less is a Russian defeat, 23 or more is a Russian victory.

== Publication history ==
The East Is Red was designed by Jim Dunnigan, with graphic design by Redmond A. Simonsen. It was first published by SPI in Strategy & Tactics No. 42, then released in both a "flat-pack" box and a regular bookcase box.

After the demise of SPI, Decision Games acquired the rights to the game. Joseph Miranda revised and updated the rules to allow for more modern armaments, and a second edition titled Dragon vs Bear: China vs Russia in the 21st Century with cover art by Eric R. Harvey was published in 2014 as a pullout game in Modern War #12.

== Reception ==
In his 1977 book The Comprehensive Guide to Board Wargaming, Nicholas Palmer called it a "good brisk game with little innovation over the [Kursk: Operation Zitadelle] game system but unusual theme."

In Moves No. 15, Thomas Sink noted that a large part of Russia's supply line issues stem from a proposed limited shipping capacity of the Trans-Siberian Railway. However, as Sink pointed out, the Russian railway system actually had the ability "to supply around 300,000 tons of supplies daily to dumps behind the front [...] If only half of this got through, it would be sufficient to supply the 45 [Russian] divisions."

== Other reviews and commentary ==
- Strategy & Tactics No. 46
- Panzerfaust No. 66
- Jagdpanther No. 6, #8 & No. 10
- International Confederation of Wargamers Newsletter No. 34
- Outposts No. 2 & No. 10
- Pursue & Destroy No. 18
