= Mission Aloft =

Board wargame published in 1977

Black & white cover of 1st edition, 1977

Mission Aloft is a board wargame published by Jim Bumpas in 1977 that simulates aerial missions against ground targets in the 1960s and 70s.

== Description ==
Mission Aloft is a two-player board wargame in which one player controls aircraft trying to complete a reconnaissance or bombing mission against a ground target, and the other player controls defenses such as surface-to-air missiles and interceptor aircraft to prevent the mission from being successfully completed. The players can choose from a variety of aircraft from the 1960s and 70s. The attacker has access to four different aircraft. The defender has a pool of 21 different aircraft, 7 helicopters, 6 naval ships, 13 antiaircraft guns, 18 surface-to-air missiles, a mobile radar, six trucks, nine tanks and six squads of soldiers. The game uses a double-blind system so that the defender does not know where the attacker's aircraft is until it has been imaged or spotted by ground troops or radar, and the attacker does not know where ground systems are until they are employed to spot the attacker.

Full-color cover of 2nd edition, 1977

For combat resolution, players can opt to use the simple Combat Resolution Table (CRT), which simply uses a six-sided die to determine effect, with 1–3 meaning "target destroyed" or 4–6 for "no effect". Players can also choose the more complex CRT that uses a graded system of damage leading to destruction.

The game comes with ten scenarios based on historical events from the 1960s and 70s, or hypothetical situations drawn from then-current geopolitical hotspots.

== Publication history ==
Mission Aloft was designed by William Streifer and published by Jim Bumpas as a ziplock bag game, first with a black & white cover in 1977, and then with a full color cover later the same year.

== Reception ==
In Issue 63 of Strategy & Tactics, game designer Richard Berg noted the complexity of the game, pointing out that each turn had 13 separate operations, and although each scenario was fairly short, games "can become somewhat complex, though not as much as it initially seems."

In Issue 8 of The Wargamer, Andrew McGee found the production values unprofessional, saying that the game "Bears many of the worst characteristics of semi amateur games [...] graphics have the appearance of being drawn hastily and with a blunt instrument [...] some counters are smudged, and the silhouettes of some air and ground units are indistinct." McGee pointed out a loophole in the rules, where both attacker and defender could remain invisible to the other despite the attacker flying right over the defender's city. McGee also thought the combat resolution system overly complex, saying, "allowances for the type and quality of weapon fired, the range, the target aircraft, Electronic Counter-Measures, pilot skill and previous damage are all brought together in a discordant clash of mathematical symbols to produce an adjustment to the throw of a single die used to resolve the attack." McGee saved his harshest words for the movement system, commenting, "If combat is unsatisfactory, movement is unacceptable; all aircraft are equally manoeuverable (though not all have the same speed) and accumulated damage has no effect until the aircraft is shot down."

In The Guide to Simulations/Games for Education and Training, Martin Campion found "the simulation is quite detailed, but well explained."

Twenty-five years after its publication, Joe Scoleri wrote a retrospective review in Issue 17 of Simulacrum. He found the double-blind system problematic, saying that the abstractions used to simplify the system took it beyond the bounds of common sense: "Ground units are initially hidden and cannot spot attacking aircraft until their location is revealed. A ground unit may voluntarily attempt to spot an attacking aircraft, but it must permanently reveal its location even if it is well outside of visual range of attacking aircraft." Scoleri also had issues with long-range radar rules, calling them "an 'educated guessing game' [that] feels more like Milton Bradley's Battleship than a depiction of an actual radar net." Scoleri concluded that Mission Aloft was "A design with an ambitious scope that falls short of the mark. There are too many flaws for Mission Aloft to function as a decent simulation. Even if there were an enjoyable game here, the complex mechanics would seem to put it outside of today's beer and pretzels realm."

== Reviews ==
- Perfidious Albion #19 (July 1977) p.13-14
