= Proud Monster =

Board wargame

Cover of Command #27, which contained Proud Monster

Proud Monster: The Barbarossa Campaign is a board wargame published by GTX in 1994 that simulates Operation Barbarossa, Germany's surprise attack on the Soviet Union during World War II.

== Background ==
On 22 June 1941, less than two years after signing the non-aggression Molotov–Ribbentrop Pact with the Soviet Union, Germany attacked across a wide front, with several strategic goals in mind: the capture of Moscow, Leningrad and Stalingrad, and the acquisition of the Caucasus oilfields and agricultural lands. Although the Germans exploited the element of surprise and quickly realized large geographical gains through the summer and fall of 1941, their offensive thrusts came to a halt short of their objectives due to their long supply lines and the oncoming winter. Although the German offenses picked up in 1942, Soviet counterattacks once again brought the German advances to a halt. By 1943, the tide had turned with a major Soviet offensive that threw the Germans into a long retreat. In April 1945, Soviet forces occupied Berlin, bringing the war in Europe to an end.

== Description ==
Proud Monster is a two-player board wargame where one player controls German forces, and the other the Soviet forces. The game takes its title from the fact that although it is a magazine pull-out game — traditionally games with a small map and only 100 or 200 counters that take 2–3 hours to play — this game is a "monster" (defined as a game with about a thousand counters), containing two large maps and 970 counters. Reviewer David W. Nicholas warned that the game would take much longer than a usual magazine pull-out game, noting "With four knowledgeable players you might complete a game in ten hours, but two players may require considerably more."

=== Gameplay ===
The game uses a relatively simple "I Go, You Go" system of alternating turns in which both players have two opportunities for action:

- 1st week
  - Weather determination
  - First player
    - Reinforcements and Reserve Movement
    - Movement and Attack
  - Second player
    - Reinforcements and Reserve Movement
    - Movement and Attack
- 2nd week
  - Weather determination
  - First player
    - Reserve Movement
    - Movement and Attack
  - Second player
    - Reserve Movement
    - Movement and Attack

Finishing these phases completes one turn, which represent two weeks of game time.

There are no zones of control. The German player can stack up to five divisions, even if these are broken up into regiments (counted as half a division) and battalions (a quarter of a division); the Soviet player is limited to any five counters, although this limit is doubled within Soviet cities. Units are in supply if they can trace a line free of enemy units to a friendly map edge. A unit that is unsupplied has its movement and combat factors halved.

The main means of combat is the Mobile Assault, which allows the attacker to break through a line and then keep moving, leaving enemy units in their wake for clean-up by a second wave of attackers.

In the second edition, Proud Monster Deluxe, most Soviet units are "untried" in 1941 and 1942 — they start the game flipped face-down, and neither player is aware of their combat strength until they enter combat.

=== Victory conditions ===
Soviet cities each have a Victory Point total, which the German player accumulates as each city is captured. A Victory Point Condition is listed for each turn of the game; if the German player reaches this total by the end of the turn indicated, the game is over. If the German player captures Moscow, the player has a 50% chance of immediately winning the game regardless of Victory Points accumulated to that point.

Box cover of Proud Monster Deluxe, artwork by Todd Davis, 2011

== Publication history ==
Ty Bomba designed Proud Monster, which was published as a pull-out game with cartography by Mark Simonitch in Issue 27 of Command (March–April 1994). The following year, Bomba designed an expansion for the game, Proud Monster: The Barbarossa Campaign – Death & Destruction: The Russian Front 1942-44, which appeared as a pull-out game in Issue 34 of Command (September 1995).

Fifteen years later, Don Johnson revised and combined the rules for both Proud Monster and its expansion. In 2012 Compass Games published the result as a boxed set titled Proud Monster Deluxe, an expanded game with four 22" x 34" maps and over 2,000 counters.

== Reception ==
In Issue 95 of Fire & Movement, David W. Nicholas thought that "XTR is taking a risk in that some people don't think magazine games should be monsters, and Proud Monster definitely qualifies in every aspect except the rules, which are tight." Nicholas found the components were slightly below the usual XTR standards, commenting, "The counters aren't pretty, a few of them are hard to read [...] and the colors are sometimes ugly." However Nicholas found "The rulebook is exemplary. [Designer Ty Bomba] is probably the best in the business at writing tight rulebooks, with everything explained and few loopholes. This is one of his better efforts." Nicholas did have some issues with the Soviet stacking rules, which allowed up to ten counters per hex in cities, saying, "This becomes clumsy, and one friend has already told me that his group made up corps-level holding counters for the larger stacks." Nevertheless, Nicholas gave a positive recommendation, saying, "This is a minor matter compared to how much fun this game is to play. [...] For those panzer-pushers who like the Eastern Front enough to spend the weekend on a game, I would definitely recommend Proud Monster."

Writing in 2011, fifteen years after its publication, Matt Irsik recalled Proud Monster as "large [with] plenty of counters, but was very playable and has stood up well through the years." Irsik then went on to review the just-published Proud Monster Deluxe by Compass Games, and found the components to be "excellent". Irsik liked the straightforward nature of the rules, saying, "Nothing here is that complex and you can quickly get into the flow of the game with the player aid cards." He noted approvingly, "Game play is faster than you think for a game of this size and a number of important decisions need to be made by both sides almost every turn." Irsik concluded with a strong recommendation, saying, "Overall, this is an outstanding monster game. The components, game play, and support by both Compass and Don Johnson has been fantastic. If you're into East Front gaming, then this has to rank up there with some of the best games on the subject."

== Awards ==
- 1995 Charles S. Roberts Awards: Proud Monster: The Barbarossa Campaign was a Finalist in the category "Best World War II Board Game of 1994"
- 1996 Charles S. Roberts Awards: Proud Monster: The Barbarossa Campaign — Death & Destruction: The Russian Front 1942-44 was a Finalist in the category "Best World War II Board Game of 1995"
