= Sedan, 1940 =

1978 WWII board wargame

- Designers: Danny Parker
- Illustrators: Redmond A. Simonsen
- Publishers: SPI
- Publication: 1978
- Genres: WWII

Sedan, 1940, subtitled "Guderian Across the Meuse", is a board wargame published by Simulations Publications Inc. (SPI) in 1978 that was a part of the Battles for the Ardennes "quadrigame" (four thematically-linked games in one box using the same rules system). Sedan, 1940 simulates the Battle of Sedan during Germany's 1940 invasion of France.

== Background ==
Although France and Germany had declared war in 1939, the two sides did not engage in conflict for the remainder of the year and the first four months of 1940, prompting newspapers to call it the "Phony War". Following the First World War, the French General Staff had ruled out the idea of a future German thrust through the Ardennes–Sedan sector, certain that such terrain could not be crossed by tanks. They also believed Germany would respect the neutrality of Belgium and the Netherlands. For that reason, France was content to wait behind the heavily fortified Maginot Line that ran along the French-German border south of the Ardennes Forest, believing that German would be forced to advance through that sector. On 13 May 1940, Germany confounded French expectations by striking through Belgium and the Netherlands as well as through the weakly defended Ardennes, bypassing the Maginot Line. French forces reeled back from Germany's blitzkrieg tactics, trying without success to slow the German advance as it approached Sedan and the Meuse River.

== Description ==
Sedan, 1940 is a wargame for two players in which one controls the German forces, and the other controls the Allied forces. The hex grid game map shows the heavily forested terrain of the Ardennes Forest.

=== Gameplay ===
At the start of each game turn, both players determine if all units are supplied. The German player and then the French player take the following phases:

1. Air strikes
2. Construction of fortified positions and bridges
3. Deploy or move artillery
4. Movement (either convoy mode or normal mode)
5. Combat

The game lasts for ten turns.

=== Supply ===
To be supplied, a unit must be within four hexes of a friendly road (unhindered by enemy units or enemy zones of control) that leads to a friendly edge of the map. If a unit is unsupplied, it moves at half rate and cannot attack, although it can defend itself at its full Strength.

=== Movement ===
All units in supply on a road, not stacked with other units and not in an enemy unit's zone of control, can be placed in convoy mode. This allows mechanized units to move three times their normal speed, while non-mechanized units move at double their normal speed.

=== Tactics ===
Critic Charles Vasey summarized the French position by pointing out that the French player must remember "he is not going to halt the German, his mission consists entirely of slowing down the advance, or putting it out of joint and being generally irritating." Karl Wiegers noted that the German player must rely on "mobility and concentration of force ... The movement of units in march mode must be sequenced so that each unit moves as far as possible each game-turn. It is especially important to avoid having infantry units blocking roads and impeding the movement of the mechanized forces, which must have movement priority."

=== Victory conditions ===
The German player wins by fulfilling all of the following by the end of the 10th turn:

1. Occupy three of: Charleville-Mexieres, Revin, Montherme, Vireux
2. Exit supplied mechanized units representing 30 Strength Points from three specific hexes on the western edge of the map
3. Exit supplied mechanized units representing 30 Strength Points from one specific hex OR occupy the city of Sedan.
4. Lose no more than 12 Strength Points in mechanized units

The French player wins by preventing the German player from fulfilling at least one of these conditions.

=== Campaign game ===
The rulebook also includes a campaign game titled "Blitzkrieg to the Meuse" that requires joining the maps of all four games of Battles for Ardennes together. The game is extended to 12 turns, and the victory conditions are simplified: The German player must exit 75 Strength points worth of mechanized units off the western edge of the map without losing more than 20 Strength Points of mechanized units.

== Publication history ==
In 1975, SPI published its first quadrigame, Blue & Gray. This proved to be popular, and SPI immediately produced further quadrigames. In 1978, SPI released the quadrigame Battles of the Ardennes featuring three games about the Battle of the Bulge, and one game, Sedan, 1940, about the German invasion of France. The quadrigame proved popular, immediately rising to #6 on SPI's Top Ten Bestseller List, rising as high as #3, and remaining on the list for the next eight months. Each of the four games, including Sedan, 1940, was also released as an individual "folio" game, packaged in an LP-style cardstock folder.

== Reception ==
In Issue 37 of the British wargaming magazine Perfidious Albion, Charles Vasey and Geoffrey Barnard discussed the game. Vasey commented, "This is a surprisingly elegant game rather in the Avalon Hill mode. Play is fast, the problems are well presented and the answers are not easy to find." Barnard commented that the inclusion of Sedan in a quadrigame dedicated to the Battle of the Bulge was "a splendid bonus."

In his 1980 book The Best of Board Wargaming, Nicholas Palmer noted that "As usual, the 1944 games steal the limelight, [but] the 1940 campaign is rarely simulated, perhaps because most people think of it as a pushover, but the game here is quite entertaining." Palmer gave this game an average "excitement" grade of 60%.

In Issue 65 of Fire & Movement, Jeff Petraska commented, "Game play is fairly simple and straight-forward, with nothing really innovative. However, it's entertaining and offers a lot of variety for the dollar."

In Issue 46 of Moves, Karl Wieger called Sedan, 1940 "well-designed, easy to play, fast-moving, and challenging for both players."

In Issue 26 of the French games magazine Casus Belli, Frederic Armand noted, "Sooner or later, the panzers, supported by their infantry, will cross the Meuse and leave the map for the long ride that was to take them to Dunkirk. All the French can do is delay the deadline a little, but in any case, for the Germans, Sedan is almost a military stroll."

== Other reviews and commentary ==
- Moves #46
- Strategy & Tactics #71
- Fire & Movement #18 and #20
- The Wargamer Vol.1 #33, and Vol.2 #17
- Campaign #95
- The Grenadier #27
- Zone of Control #4
- Paper Wars #21
- Simulations Canada Newsletter #13
- Wargame News #42
