= Syria, 1941 =

World War II wargame set in Middle East

- The Wargamer #15, which contains the 2nd edition of Syria, 1941 titled Drive on Damascus
- Designers: Vance von Borries
- Publishers: Abwehr Communications
- Publication: 1974
- Genres: World War II

Syria, 1941 is a board wargame published by Abwehr Communications in 1974 that simulates the clash between Allied forces and Vichy French forces in Syria and Lebanon during World War II. The game was redeveloped by World Wide Wargames (3W) and released as Drive on Damascus in 1980.

== Background ==
After the defeat of the Ottoman Empire during World War I, France occupied Syria. Pro-independence forces in Syria negotiated a treaty of independence with France in September 1936, but the treaty never came into force because the French Legislature refused to ratify it. After the fall of France in 1940, Syria was controlled by pro-German Vichy France, and Germany used Syrian airbases to supply German aircraft fighting against British forces in the Anglo-Iraqi War. To put an end to this and to prevent any future possibility of Germany establishing a foothold in Syria, British and Free French forces invaded Syria and Lebanon in June 1941.

== Description ==
Syria, 1941 is a two-player board wargame where one player controls Allied forces and the other player controls Vichy French forces.

=== Components ===
The game includes a 14" x 16" hex grid map of southern Syria, Lebanon and northern Palestine; 138 uncut paper counters; a 7-page mimeographed rulebook; terrain chart; and two sheets containing the initial map set-ups.

=== Gameplay ===
The game uses an alternating "I Go, You Go" system, where one player moves and fires, followed by the other player.

=== Scenarios ===
In addition to the historical game, two "what if?" scenarios are included, both involving German intervention.

== Publication history ==
In the early 1970s, Vance von Borries designed Syria, 1941, a subject not previously covered by any board wargame, and sold it to indie game publisher Abwehr Publications, which released the game in 1974 packaged in a plastic bag. After Abwehr was taken over by JagdPanther Publications, JagdPanther sold Syria, 1941 to 3W, who greatly revised both the rules and the map, retitled the game Drive on Damascus, and published the new game in Issue 15 of The Wargamer in 1981.

== Reception ==
In Issue 7 of Conflict, Jack Greene called it "A fun little game that is quick to play and has several optional set-ups that include German parachute units."

In Issue 60 of Fire & Movement, Vance von Borries, who had designed the original Syria, 1941 game but had not been involved with the game when 3W revised and renamed it, reviewed the new game Drive on Damascus and called it "a greatly rebuilt and expanded version of my earlier Syria, 1941. That game, which was a bit simpler and not as well developed, suffered from poor production values."

John Prados reviewed 3W's Drive on Damascus edition, and liked the revision to the map, calling it, "a novel type of hexagon representation that allows terrain features to stand out much more clearly."

In Issue 26 of Simulacrum, Pete de Rosa noted "It is fun and quick. Optional rules and variable orders of battle give the game more variety than you might expect in a simple game." However, de Rosa thought the game was unbalanced in favor of the British.

== Legacy ==
Abwehr Publications only lasted about a year, and its only product, Syria, 1941, did not sell well. As a result, copies of the original game are quite rare.
