= Modern Naval Battles II: The Campaign Game =

1990 board game

Modern Naval Battles II: The Campaign Game is a board game published in 1990 by 3W.

== Contents ==
Modern Naval Battles II is a game in which a team format is presented in an expansion to the original Modern Naval Battles.

== Reception ==
Brian Walker reviewed Modern Naval Battles II for Games International magazine, and gave it a rating of 8 out of 10, and stated that "The division between American ships and Russian ships give the game far more flavour now, and reduce the inherent absurdity of the mixed fleets that sailed in MNB."

== Reviews ==
- Fire & Movement #69
- Casus Belli #62
