= Eric J. Wittenberg =

American historian

- Born: March 26, 1961; Philadelphia, Pennsylvania, U.S.
- Died: August 2, 2025 (aged 64)
- Occupations: Historian, attorney
- Board member of: Central Virginia Battlefields Trust; Little Big Horn Associates; Buffington Island Battlefield Preservation Foundation
- Awards: Bachelder-Coddington Award (1998); Army Historical Foundation Distinguished Writing Award (2011)

Academic background
- Education: Dickinson College; University of Pittsburgh
- Alma mater: University of Pittsburgh

Academic work
- Discipline: American Civil War history
- Sub-discipline: Cavalry operations, Battle of Gettysburg
- Main interests: Civil War cavalry, battlefield preservation

Eric J. Wittenberg (March 26, 1961 – August 2, 2025) was an American Civil War (Civil War) historian, author, lecturer, tour guide and battlefield preservationist. He was a practicing attorney in downtown Columbus, Ohio. His published works have focused especially on the Civil War cavalryman and the cavalry battles of the Civil War, with emphasis on the Army of the Potomac's Cavalry Corps. His first book, Gettysburg's Forgotten Cavalry Actions, was chosen as the best new work addressing the Battle of Gettysburg in 1998, winning the Robert E. Lee Civil War Roundtable of Central New Jersey's Bachelder-Coddington Award. The second edition of this book, published in 2011, won the U. S. Army Historical Foundation's Distinguished Writing Award for that year's best reprint. In 2015, his book The Devil's to Pay: John Buford at Gettysburg won the Gettysburg Civil War Roundtable's 2015 Book Award. He was a member of the Governor of Ohio’s Advisory Commission on the Sesquicentennial of the Civil War and has been active with several Civil War battlefield preservation organizations. He and his wife Susan Skilken Wittenberg resided on the east side of Columbus, Ohio.

== Early life and education ==
Eric Wittenberg was born March 26, 1961, in Philadelphia, Pennsylvania. He earned an undergraduate degree in political science and economics from Dickinson College in Carlisle, Pennsylvania, in 1983. Wittenberg earned both a master's degree in public and international affairs from the University of Pittsburgh Graduate School of Public and International Affairs and a Juris Doctor degree from the University of Pittsburgh School of Law in 1987.

== Law practice ==
Wittenberg had practiced law since 1987. His several areas of concentration include subjects related to his work as a historian, including internet law and media and publishing law, including copyright law. He was a partner in the Columbus, Ohio law firm of Cook, Sladoje & Wittenberg Co., L.P.A., where he managed the law firm's litigation practice.

Wittenberg was a member of various bar associations and the Westerville, Ohio Chamber of Commerce.

== Battlefield preservation and civic work ==
Wittenberg was a member of the Governor of Ohio’s Advisory Commission on the Sesquicentennial of the Civil War.

As of July 2016, Wittenberg was the vice president of the Buffington Island Battlefield Preservation Foundation.

His preservation efforts have included work with the Civil War Preservation Trust, the Trevilian Station Foundation, and Brandy Station Foundation. Due to his familiarity with and expertise concerning Civil War battles and battlefields, he had given lectures on the Civil War and has led battlefield tours. As of 2022, Wittenberg served as a member of the board of the Central Virginia Battlefields Trust and as board chairman of the Little Big Horn Associates. He also served as the program coordinator for the Chambersburg Civil War Seminars and Tours.

== Books and articles ==
"Gettysburg Magazine", "North & South", "Blue & Gray", "Hallowed Ground, America’s Civil War", and "Civil War Times Illustrated" have published over two dozen of Wittenberg's articles on cavalry in the American Civil War.

Wittenberg had been on the board of directors for North and South Magazine. He was a founding member and past president of the Central Ohio Civil War Roundtable.

Wittenberg is the author or co-author of the following books

- Mingus, Scott L. and Eric J. Wittenberg. “If We Are Striking for Pennsylvania”: The Army of Northern Virginia and the Army of the Potomac March to Gettysburg - Volume 1: June 3–21, 1863. El Dorado Hills, CA: Savas Beatie, 2022. ISBN 978-1-61121-584-7.
- Powell, David A. and Eric J. Wittenberg. Tullahoma: The Forgotten Campaign that changed the Civil War, June 23–July 4, 1863. El Dorado Hills, CA: Savas Beatie, 2020. ISBN 978-1-61121-504-5.
- Wittenberg, Eric J. At Custer's Side: The Civil War Writings of James Harvey Kidd. Kent, OH: Kent State University Press, 2001. ISBN 978-0-87338-687-6.
- Wittenberg, Eric J. The Battle of Brandy Station: North America's Largest Cavalry Battle. Charleston, SC: The History Press, 2010. ISBN 978-1-59629-782-1.
- Wittenberg, Eric J. The Battle of Monroe's Crossroads and the Civil War's Final Campaign. El Dorado Hills, CA: Savas Beatie, 2006. ISBN 978-1-932714-17-3.
- Wittenberg, Eric J. The Battle of White Sulphur Springs: Averell Fails to Secure West Virginia. Charleston, SC: The History Press, 2011. ISBN 978-1-60949-005-8.
- Wittenberg, Eric J. The Devil's to Pay: John Buford at Gettysburg: A History and Walking Tour. El Dorado Hills, CA: Savas Beatie, 2014, 2015, 2018. ISBN 978-1-61121-444-4.
- Wittenberg, Eric J. Five or Ten Minutes of Blind Confusion: The Battle of Aiken, South Carolina, February 11, 1865. Burlington, NC: Fox Run Publishing, 2018. ISBN 978-1-945602-07-8.
- Wittenberg, Eric J. Gettysburg's Forgotten Cavalry Actions: Farnsworth's Charge, South Cavalry Field, and the Battle of Fairfield, July 3, 1863, revised and expanded edition. New York: Savas Beatie LLC, 2011. ISBN 978-1-61121-070-5.
- Wittenberg, Eric J. Glory Enough For All: Sheridan's Second Raid and the Battle of Trevilian Station. Washington, DC: Brassey's, Inc., 2001. ISBN 978-1-57488-468-5.
- Wittenberg, Eric J. Holding the Line on the River of Death: Union Mounted Forces at Chickamauga, September 18, 1863. El Dorado Hills, CA: Savas Beatie, 2018. ISBN 978-1-61121-430-7.
- Wittenberg, Eric J. Like a Meteor Blazing Brightly: The short but controversial life of Colonel Ulric Dahlgren. Roseville, MN: Edinborough Press, 2009. ISBN 978-1-889020-33-4.
- Wittenberg, Eric J. Little Phil: A Reassessment of the Civil War Leadership of Gen. Philip H. Sheridan. Washington, DC: Brassey's, 2002. ISBN 978-1-57488-385-5.
- Wittenberg, Eric J. One of Custer's Wolverines: The Civil War Letters of Brevet Brigadier General James H. Kidd, 6th Michigan Cavalry. Kent, OH: Kent State University Press, 2000. ISBN 978-0-87338-670-8.
- Wittenberg, Eric J. Protecting the Flank at Gettysburg: The Battles for Brinkerhoff's Ridge and East Cavalry Field, July 2–3, 1863. El Dorado Hills, CA: Savas Beatie LLC, 2013. Originally published as Protecting the Flanks: The Battles for Brinkerhoff's Ridge and East Cavalry Field, Battle of Gettysburg, July 2–3, 1863. Ironclad Publishing, 2002. ISBN 978-1-61121-094-1.
- Wittenberg, Eric J. Rush's Lancers: The Sixth Pennsylvania Cavalry in the Civil War. Yardley, PA: Westholme, 2007. ISBN 978-1-59416-032-5.
- Wittenberg, Eric J., Edmund A. Sargus Jr. and Penny Barrick. Seceding from Secession: The Civil War, Politics, and the Creation of West Virginia. El Dorado Hills, CA: Savas Beatie, 2020. ISBN 978-1-61121-506-9.
- Wittenberg, Eric J. and Scott Mingus, Sr. The Second Battle of Winchester: The Confederate Victory that Opened the Door to Gettysburg. El Dorado Hills, CA: Savas Beatie LLC, 2016. ISBN 978-1-61121-288-4.
- Wittenberg, Eric J. The Union Cavalry Comes of Age: Hartwood Church to Brandy Station, 1863. Dulles, Virginia: Potomac Books, Inc., 2003, 2017. ISBN 978-1-57488-650-4.
- Wittenberg, Eric J. Under Custer's Command: The Civil War Journal of James Henry Avery (Memories of War). Washington, DC: Brassey's, 2000. ISBN 978-1-57488-276-6.
- Wittenberg, Eric J. We Have It Damn Hard Out Here": The Civil War Letters of Sergeant Thomas W. Smith, 6th Pennsylvania Cavalry . Kent, OH: Kent State University Press, 1999. ISBN 978-0-87338-623-4.
- Wittenburg, Eric J. We Ride a Whirlwind: Sherman and Johnston at Bennett Place. Burlington, NC: Fox Run Publishing, LLC, 2017. ISBN 978-1-945602-03-0.
- Wittenberg, Eric J. With Sheridan in the Final Campaign Against Lee. Baton Rouge, LA: Louisiana State University Press, 2002. ISBN 978-0-8071-2756-8.
- Wittenberg, Eric J., and Daniel T. Davis. Out Flew the Sabers: The Battle of Brandy Station, June 9, 1863. El Dorado Hills, CA: Savas Beatie LLC, 2016. ISBN 978-1-61121-256-3.
- Wittenberg, Eric J., and J. David Petruzzi. Plenty of Blame to Go Around: Jeb Stuart's Controversial Ride to Gettysburg. New York: Savas Beatie, 2006. ISBN 978-1-932714-20-3.
- Wittenberg, Eric J., J. David Petruzzi, and Michael F. Nugent. One Continuous Fight: The Retreat from Gettysburg and the Pursuit of Lee's Army of Northern Virginia, July 4–14, 1863. New York: Savas Beatie, 2008. ISBN 978-1-932714-43-2.
- Wittenberg, Eric J. '"We Ride a Whirlwind": Sherman and Johnston at Bennett Place', Burlington, NC: Fox Run Publishing, 2017. ISBN 978-1-94560-202-3.

Wittenberg is the co-author with Michael Aubrecht of YOU STINK! Major League Baseball's Terrible Teams and Pathetic Players. Kent, OH: Black Squirrel Books, 2012. ISBN 978-1-60635-138-3.

Wittenberg has a blog devoted to the Civil War, "Rantings of a Civil War Historian."

His published works have focused on the Civil War cavalryman and the cavalry battles of the Civil War, especially on the Army of the Potomac’s Cavalry Corps. His first book, Gettysburg's Forgotten Cavalry Actions, won the Robert E. Lee Civil War Roundtable of Central New Jersey's Bachelder-Coddington Award as the best new work addressing the Battle of Gettysburg in 1998. The second edition won the Army Historical Foundation's Distinguished Writing Award, for Reprint, 2011. His book The Devil's to Pay: John Buford at Gettysburg won the Gettysburg Civil War Roundtable's 2015 Book Award.

== Death ==
After a two year battle with non-Hodgkin's lymphoma, Eric died on August 2, 2025 in Columbus, Ohio. He is survived by his wife Susan Wittenberg.
