= Tomorrow the World (board game) =

1989 board game

Tomorrow the World is a board game published in 1989 by 3W.

== Contents ==
Tomorrow the World is a game in which the Axis powers won World War II and divided up the world between them.

== Reception ==
Martin Croft reviewed Tomorrow the World for Games International magazine, and gave it 1 star (a turkey) out of 5, and stated that "All in all, a disappointment. I like alternate history fiction, because as a wargamer I enjoy exploring 'What Might Have Beens'. But I prefer to feel that a bit of effort has gone into it."

== Reviews ==
- Casus Belli #56
- "The Year's Best Games" in Games #101
