= Light Division (board game) =

1989 board game

Light Division is a board game published in 1989 by World Wide Wargames.

== Contents ==
Light Division is a game in which a US military action against Iran is portrayed in an operational level game.

== Reception ==
Lee Brimmicombe-Wood reviewed Light Division for Games International magazine, and gave it 2 stars out of 5, and stated that "To divorce the political sphere from the game turns Light Division into little more than a military arcade game and not the authentic simulation the designers like to think it is."

== Reviews ==
- Fire & Movement #72
- Casus Belli #57
