= Simon de Montfort (game) =

Simon de Montfort is a 1979 wargame published by World Wide Wargames.

== Gameplay ==
Simon de Montfort is a game in which a colorful and informative map adds to a medieval-themed wargame. Towns and castles on the map have recruitment values for each side, and the road network highlights the strategic importance of castles guarding vital routes. Counters depict knights and serjeants (men-at-arms). The game begins with both sides setting up and spending a few months recruiting, simulating the start of a civil war and preventing a "First Move Blitz." This allows Rebels to capture key locations like Bristol, Norwich, and York before the Royalists, who face challenging victory conditions. Recruitment represents the gathering of troops in areas of Rebel or Royalist strength. Combat involves multiple rounds, with an anti-combination rule preventing several friendly stacks from combining in battle. After each round, morale is checked, and units that break are placed in adjacent hexes as a retreat result. Victory points are accumulated throughout the game.

== Reception ==
Perfidious Albion #46 (May 1980) reviewed Simon de Montfort and stated that "The game is simple, colourful and fun. It is historical in content if not in period. Its problem is the very nature of its simplicity which reduces the game to very similar strategies. It is still well worth the money for the map alone - congratulations Martin Edwardes."
