= For Your Eyes Only (magazine) =

For Your Eyes Only was a gaming magazine first published in 1980 by Simulations Publications, Inc., edited by David James Ritchie.

== Contents ==
For Your Eyes Only was a magazine built from the "FYEO" column published previously in Strategy & Tactics magazine, and focused on recent military actions, anticipated developments, and military technology.

== Reception ==
Steve Jackson reviewed For Your Eyes Only in The Space Gamer No. 44. Jackson commented that "Very few of us need this kind of data [...] For those who do, though, FYEO is probably worth the cost. Recommended for the professional game designer or well-off modern/future game buff."
