= Hitler's Last Gamble =

Board game

Hitler's Last Gamble is a board game published in 1989 by 3W.

== Contents ==
Hitler's Last Gamble is a game in which the Battle of the Bulge is played on two paper maps.

== Reception ==
Norman Smith reviewed Hitler's Last Gamble for Games International magazine, and gave it 4 stars out of 5, and stated that "I welcomed the opportunity to review this game, although perhaps my wife might not agree. She is pleased to have her house and husband back."

The Chicago Tribune said "it may be the best Bulge game since SPI's old Wacht am Rhein, if you have the patience and space."

== Reviews ==
- Casus Belli #55
