= Give Me Liberty! =

Give Me Liberty! is a 1992 board game published by 3W.

== Gameplay ==
Give Me Liberty! is a game in which a hex‑and‑counter wargame of the American Revolutionary War uses monthly turns, leader activations, unit movement and combat ratings, attrition, and scenario-based operations to simulate campaigning across the colonies.

== Reception ==
Perfidious Albion felt that "My suspicion is that Give me Liberty! is too cut and dried to fully simulate the feel of the war, but it remains a suspicion. If it is an accurate simulation then it is no game and far too long to be played as a non-game. (I think one can play biased games if short and cleverly constructed with victory conditions). It remains a nice little counter artwork package."

== Reviews ==
- Berg's Review of Games#5
