= ASG Baseball =

1973 board game

ASG Baseball is a board game published in 1973 by 3W.

== Contents ==
ASG Baseball is a game in which the game system involves D20 die rolls cross referenced against player statistics.

== Reception ==
The Hamilton JournalNews said "the game definitely shows promise. If you plan to simply spend one evening by playing a game with a friend, ASG ranks high on the basis of enjoyment."

Ellis Simpson reviewed ASG Baseball for Games International magazine, and gave it 4 stars out of 5, and stated that "Like many baseball games there is much more work and research than a few pieces of paper can hold. The man hours involved in this project must have been enormous. The end result is a game that baseball fans and sports gamers and will love. No ifs, or buts."
