= The Defense of Rorke's Drift (wargame) =

Board wargame

Box cover featuring detail from "The Defense of Rorke's Drift" by Alphonse de Neuville

The Defense of Rorke's Drift is a board wargame published by World Wide Wargames (3W) in 1991 that simulates the Battle of Rorke's Drift, when forces of the Zulu Kingdom besieged a small outpost of British soldiers during the Anglo-Zulu War. A second game, The Boer War, was included in the box.

== Background ==
Seeking to create a large British colony in South Africa that would encompass the hitherto independent Zulu Kingdom as well as the independent Boer states of the Republic of South Africa, British High Commissioner to South Africa Bartle Frere sent a provocative ultimatum to Zulu king Cetshwayo. When this was rejected, Frere sent a British task force to invade the Zulu Kingdom. The Zulu, although outgunned, showed discipline and defeated the British force at the Battle of Isandlwana. A Zulu force of 4000 then attacked 120 British soldiers at a mission station called Rorke's Drift.

== Description ==
The Defense of Rorke's Drift is a board wargame for two players in which one player controls the Zulu attackers and the other controls the British defenders.

The game components include 400 die-cut counters, and a map of the outpost showing a small hospital occupied by about 20 patients and medical staff, a store house, and the hastily erected perimeter fortifications linking the two buildings.

=== Gameplay ===
Each turn involves 6 phases:

1. British movement
2. Zulu movement and reinforcements
3. British rifle attacks
4. Zulu rifle and spear attacks
5. Zulu melee attacks
6. British melee attacks

There are not enough Zulu counters to represent the entire Zulu force, so discarded Zulu counters are reintroduced to the game through reinforcements.

=== Scenarios ===
The game provides five scenarios:

- A short solitaire scenario involving a British evacuation of the hospital.
- The same scenario but designed for two players.
- The full historical battle
- The British try to evacuate the outpost and are caught in the open with no fortifications
- The British player designs a new perimeter fortification.

=== The Boer War ===
The box also includes the rules for a second game, The Boer War, using separate components: a map of South Africa and 200 die-cut counters. The game is a strategic-level simulation of the Second Boer War

== Publication history ==
The Defense of Rorke's Drift was designed by Peter Bertram, Eric Faust, and Lew Fisher, and was published as a boxed set by 3W in 1991. The box cover features a reproduction of the painting The Defense of Rorke's Drift by the 19th-century artist Alphonse de Neuville.

The second game included in the box, The Boer War, was designed by Eric Faust and Lew Fisher.

== Reception ==
In Issue 79 of Fire & Movement, James C. Gordon wrote a lengthy review and concluded, "The Defense of Rorke's Drift offers value for the money. RD succeeds because of the solid research and an appropriately detailed system. As a game system and a tactical problem to be solved, this design challenges both sides." However, Gordon warned, "The full campaign is a lengthy undertaking and requires stamina from both players."

Writing for Simulacrum, Luc Olivier called this "an interesting game to play ... very tactical and exotic. Everything from the rules to the map and the counters conspire to provide a feeling of the event: a farm filled with British and Colonials, some wounded, attacked by hordes of Zulus during a terrible night." Olivier noted "the rules are quite long but logical and with a lot of details like roof burning, moving the wounded, British ranked fire, all lengthily explained with a lot of examples." Despite the lengthy rules, Olivier thought that "the game plays smoothly in spite of the number of counters and the many steps of the sequence of play." Olivier liked the game but noted the lack of different scenarios, concluding, "With the time required to play and the repetitive situation, the replay value is quite limited but the experience of play is great."
