= Turning Point: The Battle of Stalingrad =

1972 WWII board wargame

Turning Point
- Designers: Jim Dunnigan
- Illustrators: Redmond A. Simonsen
- Publishers: Simulations Publications Inc.
- Publication: 1972
- Genres: WWII

Turning Point: The Battle of Stalingrad is a board wargame published by Simulations Publications Inc. (SPI) in 1972 that simulates the Battle of Stalingrad during World War II, and the factors that led to the encirclement and destruction of Germany's Sixth Army.

== Background ==
In June 1941, Germany launched Operation Barbarossa, a massive invasion of the Soviet Union. Although they made immense geographical gains, lengthening supply lines and stiffening defenses forced the Germans to bring their advance to a halt in the fall. The following year saw limited gains in certain theaters as the Germans countered several Soviet offensives. But by the summer of 1942, the German summer offensive ended early as the German Sixth Army found itself in a slow grinding battle with the Soviet 62nd Army for the city of Stalingrad. By the fall, that offensive came to a complete halt. With the Russian winter settling in, German intelligence did not believe the Soviets had the necessary combat strength to punch through the Sixth Army and did not set up defenses to guard against a Soviet winter offensive. On 19 November 1942 the Soviets launched Operation Uranus, a major offensive not against the Sixth Army, but against the Hungarian forces guarding the Sixth Army's left flank and the Romanians guarding their right flank. Rather than retreating out of Stalingrad to set up a new line of defense before they could be surrounded, the Sixth Army was ordered by Adolph Hitler to stay in Stalingrad. The Soviets quickly pierced the Romanian and Hungarian lines, and encircled the entire Sixth Army. After German rescue forces unsuccessfully tried to break through the Soviet ring, the Sixth Army was forced to surrender. Stalingrad was a turning point, changing the entire course of the European theater of the war, as the Germans started a slow retreat back to Berlin.

== Description ==
Turning Point is a two-player board wargame, where one player controls the Axis forces, and the other the Soviet forces. The game has 400 counters, and has been described as "fairly complex" and "moderately difficult".

=== Gameplay ===
Turning Point uses an alternating series of turns, where the German player has three phases:

1. Movement: All units can move
2. Combat
3. Mechanized Movement: Only mechanized units can take a second move action

The Soviet player then has the same phases, completing one Game Turn, which represents two days of the battle.

To simulate the German lack of defensive preparations, during the first turn, Soviet units attack with better odds.

There are also optional rules about Russian command control difficulties, and the Adolf Hitler "stand and die" command, which forces the Sixth Army to remain in place.

=== Scenarios ===
The game comes with three main scenarios:

- "Campaign": Starting on 19 November, this covers the entire battle in 21 game turns
- "Breakthrough": Starting on 19 November, this simulates the Soviet attack, and covers only the first 7 turns of the "Campaign" scenario
- "Relief": Starting on 16 December, this simulates German attempts to break the Russian encirclement, and covers the last 7 turns of the "Campaign" scenario.

There are also thirteen other scenarios, all based on these three, but offering a variety of orders of battle, deployment restrictions, and reinforcement arrivals.

== Publication history ==
Until 1971, all board wargames used a simple alternating system of "move and attack." In 1971, Jim Dunnigan of SPI added an extra movement phase for mechanized forces to Kursk: Operation Zitadelle to simulate the ability of tanks to exploit breakthroughs. The following year, Dunnigan used the same "Kursk" system for Turning Point, which was published as a boxed set with graphic design by Redmond A. Simonsen.

=== Reception ===
Writing for The Pouch, Nicholas Ulanov was not impressed by this game, finding that it was too dependent on its predecessor Kursk, noting that Turning Point was "totally overshadowed by Kursk." Ulanov concluded by giving the game a rating of only 2 out of 4.

In his 1977 book The Comprehensive Guide to Board Wargaming, Nicky Palmer pointed out that the Battle of Stalingrad was not a popular subject for wargames in the 1970s, commenting "although this was probably the most crucial battle of the war, it is rarely simulated." Palmer also noted the similarity to its predecessor Kursk, but he liked the inclusion of sixteen different scenarios.

In The Guide to Simulations/Games for Education and Training, Martin Campion called Turning Point "a lively, moderately difficult game on an important development." As an educational aid in the classroom, Campion noted, "The game shows the importance of the irrational German dispositions at the beginning of the Russian attack, the hopelessness of the German army caught inside the trap, and the importance of the Russian supply difficulties that prevented an even greater victory."

=== Other reviews and commentary ===
- Fire & Movement #5 and #63
- JagdPanther #9
