= Keith Poulter =

- Occupations: Publisher and editor

Keith Poulter is a publisher and an editor who has worked on both magazines and wargames.

== Career ==
Keith Poulter taught political science. In 1977 he founded the wargame company UKW, UK Wargamer, which by summer 1978 was better known as World Wide Wargames (3W). In 1980, a commentator said the creation of the company and its magazine The Wargamer was "the most important development in British wargaming for years", and noted the quality of games produced in the magazine.

Following a period of declining subscriptions for the magazine Strategy & Tactics, 3W acquired the publication from #112 (June 1987) to #139 (December 1990). Keith Poulter was the editor from issues #112 to #119, Ty Bomba from #120 to #129, Jim Dunnigan from #130 to #139. Although circulation began to increase again, subscriptions never recovered fully, and most sales were through game stores and not subscriptions, which meant third-party retailers cut into profits. Poulter left the wargames publishing business, and in 1991 3W sold Strategy & Tactics to Decision Games.

In 1997, he launched and was the editor of the "leading" and "highly respected" history magazine North & South – The Official Magazine of the Civil War Society (1997-2013).
