= North & South (US magazine) =

Official Magazine of the Civil War Society

North & South - The Official Magazine of the Civil War Society
- Editor: Keith Poulter
- Categories: American Civil War
- Frequency: Bi-monthly
- Founded: 1997
- Final issue: present
- Company: Civil War Society
- Country: United States
- Based in: Tollhouse, California
- Website: North & South
- ISSN: 1522-9742
- OCLC: 40601055

North & South – The Official Magazine of the Civil War Society is a military history and general history bi-monthly magazine published in the United States concerning the American Civil War (1861–65). The magazine was originally based out of Tollhouse, California. The magazine's first run ended in 2013, but the magazine was restarted in 2020.

== Purpose ==
North & South was founded in 1997 with a focus on historical accuracy with frequent ground breaking topics. This is often done by discussion articles that is unique to this magazine. The book review section and "Crossfire" provide a mix of light and detail. It is considered an accurate historical magazine without a "pop" magazine feel.

== Format ==
The magazine is an 8 inch by 10 3/4 inch color glossy cover with 65 to 85 magazine grade pages containing primarily black and white pictures related to the American Civil War with color pictures for a nice balance.

== Articles ==
The magazine features articles on historical figures, weapons, battles, campaigns, and events pertaining to the Civil War. These articles typically include appropriate illustrations and an expanded bibliography for further reading. They may also feature eyewitness accounts and other war-related topics. The coverage spans a diverse range of historical events both before and after the American Civil War. Additionally, the magazine includes an editorial page and brief reviews of history books and simulations.
