= Modern Naval Battles =

1989 board game

Modern Naval Battles is a board game published in 1989 by 3W.

== Contents ==
Modern Naval Battles is a game in which players use cards to sink each other's ships.

== Reception ==
Brian Walker reviewed Modern Naval Battles for Games International magazine, and gave it 3 stars out of 5, and stated that "the game is quite fun to play and inevitably provokes lots of whinges and vindictiveness from those types who don't know any better. However, it lacks that certain something which made Enemy In Sight such a joy."

The Chicago Tribune said that "Modern Naval Battles is a simple, playable card game designed for quick play but surprisingly subtle."

== Reviews ==
- Casus Belli #62
