= 3W (company) =

Wargame company

World Wide Wargames, or 3W, was a wargame company founded in 1977 (as UKW, UK Wargamer) by Keith Poulter.

== History ==
3W Inc, also known as World Wide Wargames, was a wargame company that began publishing in 1977. Originally launched in England, the company moved later to California. In addition to producing boxed wargames, 3W published the magazine The Wargamer.

TSR published the magazine Strategy & Tactics from 1983 – 1987 and then sold the rights to 3W, who published the magazine from #112 (June, 1987) to #139, and when founder Keith Poulter left the business, 3W sold Strategy & Tactics to Decision Games.

Diverse Talents, Inc. published the game magazines Space Gamer/Fantasy Gamer, Fire and Movement, and Battleplan, until the company was bought by World Wide Wargames, Inc. on June 1, 1988. 3W was looking to get into the role-playing industry, and began publication with Space Gamer/Fantasy Gamer #83 (1988) followed by licensed adventures including City of Angels (1989) for Twilight: 2000, The Liftwood Conspiracy (1989) for Space: 1889 and Operation Overlord (1989) for Traveller: 2300. According to Shannon Appelcline, "Under the 3W ownership, the quality of the Space Gamer magazines improved but they still looked somewhat dated. 3W decided to resolve this problem following the release of Space Gamer/Fantasy Gamer #85 (January/February, 1989). Afterward they 'rebooted' the magazine. Space Gamer Vol. II, No. 1 (July/August, 1989) featured a much more professional cover and somewhat improved interior contents. Unfortunately the new Space Gamer only lasted through Vol. II, No. 2 (October/November, 1989). In that last issue, the editor rather angrily decried White Wolf Magazine who had said that they were 'the only independent magazine left in the market'. But, for all purposes that statement was largely true. Though considerably improved from its worst DTI days, the times of Space Gamer influencing the industry were over." 3W left the RPG business towards the end of 1989 after some failed expansions resulted in selling off properties, and 3W sold Space Gamer to Future Combat Simulations, who released only a single issue, Space Gamer #88 (March/April, 1990).

After that, the company also took charges of the magazine Moves for several years before selling to Decision Games. The company was known to be extremely prolific and to produce simple games, with a lot of scenarios available in each game, and always at a reasonable price. They also published the magazine Schwerpunkt. The company closed in 1995.

== List of games published ==
- Bloody Buna (The Wargamer #9, 1972)
- ASG Baseball (1973)
- Chinese Civil War (1979)
- Simon de Montfort (1979)
- Drive on Damascus (1980, a revised edition of JadgPanther's Syria, 1941)
- Ancients (1986)
- Hitler's Last Gamble (1989)
- Light Division (1989)
- Modern Naval Battles (1989)
- Tomorrow the World (1989)
- Africa Orientale (1989, S&T #128)
- Modern Naval Battles II: The Campaign Game (1990)
- The Defense of Rorke's Drift (1991)
- Give Me Liberty! (1992)

== See also ==
List of game manufacturers
