= Kursk: Operation Zitadelle =

1971 WWII board wargame

- Cover of flat-pack box edition, 1971
- Designers: Jim Dunnigan
- Illustrators: Redmond A. Simonsen
- Publishers: Simulations Publications Inc.
- Publication: 1971
- Genres: WWII

Kursk: Operation Zitadelle is a board wargame published by Simulations Publications Inc. (SPI) in 1971. It was the first wargame to simulate the Battle of Kursk, a large tank battle during World War II.

== Background ==
In July 1943, the German summer offensive in Russia, "Operation Zitadelle", ran into a strongly entrenched Russian tank army near the city of Kursk. Nearly 1,400 tanks and assault guns were involved in what became known as the largest tank battle in history, resulting in the destruction of almost 300 tanks on each side. Although the Russians withdrew, the battle was the final strategic offensive that the Germans were able to launch on the Eastern Front. A month later, the Russians launched a counteroffensive that marked the beginning of the slow German retreat back to Berlin and the end of the war.

== Description ==
Kursk: Operation Zitadelle is a two-player wargame in which one player controls German attackers and the other controls Soviet defenders.

=== Components ===
The game box contains:

- 22" x 28" paper hex grid map scaled at 10 mi (16 km) per hex
- 255 die-cut counters
- a map-folded rules sheet
- Combat Results Table and Turn Record

=== Gameplay ===
Like most wargames of the time, Kursk starts each turn with alternating movement and fire. However, Kursk emphasizes the power and mobility of tanks by giving all mechanized units a second movement phase to allow for a breakthrough after successful combat. So the first player has three phases:

1. First Movement (all units)
2. Fire
3. Second Movement (mechanized units only)

The second player then has the same three phases, completing one full turn, which represents 2 days of game time.

This move-fire-move process, called the "Kursk system", was used in many subsequent SPI products during the 1970s, including The Game of France, 1940; Turning Point; Destruction of Army Group Center; The East is Red; El Alamein; and The Moscow Campaign.

==== Air power ====
Each player has air units represented by two counters, one for the actual aircraft, the other for ground support. Counters are assigned permanently to each other, and neither can operate without the other. During a turn, the player has two options: either the pair of counters moves as a unit on the ground, or the air element flies but then the ground support counter cannot move. One of five air missions can be launched:

1. Close Support: aiding the attacks of friendly units
2. Combat Air Patrol: aiding the defense of friendly units
3. Air Superiority: attack enemy ground support units
4. Interdiction: attack retreat and supply routes
5. Interception: nullify an enemy air mission

If the ground support counter is eliminated, the air support unit is automatically withdrawn from the game.

=== Scenarios ===
The game includes two historical scenarios with programmed unit placement and reinforcement, and four hypothetical "what if?" scenarios with free unit deployment. Every scenario is six turns long.

== Publication history ==
Kursk was designed by Sterling S. Hart and developed by Jim Dunnigan, with graphic design by Redmond A. Simonsen. It was published by SPI in 1971 as the first board wargame to simulate the Battle of Kursk, and was one of only a handful at that time to simulate a single battle rather than an entire campaign. The game was offered in both a plain white box with a red title ribbon, and a "flatpack" box with traditional cover art and an integrated counter tray.

In a 1976 poll conducted by SPI to determine the most popular board wargames in North America, Kursk placed a disappointing 173rd out of 202 games, indicative that five years after publication, it was considered out-of-date.

Ten years after its publication, Eric Goldberg revised the rules completely, and the new edition was published by SPI in 1980 with the new title Kursk: History's Greatest Tank Battle, July 1943.

== Reception ==
In Issue 32 of Albion (September 1971), Don Turnbull called the game system "A most satisfactory set of play mechanics, which make play straightforward and interesting without being too complex and drawn out." However, Turnbull noted the similarities to SPI's 1918 published in 1970, commenting "There is little that is new here. Kursk is the result of a well-tried formula being cleaned up, re-shuffled slightly, and applied to a new game situation with new and interesting air rules." He concluded that ownership of both games was not necessary, saying, "I would recommend Kursk to those who have not got 1918; they might buy both, of course, but would probably stick to Kursk alone. Those who have 1918 — well you are getting very little more in this game."

In his 1977 book The Comprehensive Guide to Board Wargaming, Nicholas Palmer noted that Kursk was a popular game in the early 1970s, "but has slid since more advanced simulation techniques for tank-dominated conflicts have been developed."

In The Guide to Simulations/Games for Education and Training, Martin Campion was impressed by this game, saying "Kursk shows clearly the hopelessness of the historic German offensive and the growing but still very imperfect Russian offensive power in 1943."

Looking back at the game ten years after its publication, Steve List thought that Kursk "was not an outstanding game, but has hung on as a 'lower-rated' one for quite a while."

== Awards ==
The 1980 edition of Kursk was a finalist for a Charles S. Roberts Award in the category "Best Twentieth Century Game of 1980."
