= Ty Bomba =

American board game designer

Tyrone S. Bomba is a prolific American board wargame designer, credited as the designer of over 125 board wargames and game items. Bomba is the recipient of the James F. Dunnigan Award, has been inducted into the Charles Roberts Awards Hall of Fame for his contributions to the wargaming industry, and several of his games have won Charles S. Roberts Awards.

== Early life ==
In the mid-1960s, while Ty Bomba was in elementary school in Pennsylvania, his grandmother gave him a copy of a Parker Brothers American Civil War wargame titled 1863; due to that game, he later stated, "I discovered how much fun this hobby is, and was hooked." Bomba continued to play board wargames during high school, and was heavily influenced by the early works of seminal board wargame designers John Hill, Jim Dunnigan, and Frank Chadwick. In his final year of high school in 1969, Bomba started to write articles for several wargame magazines. He then attended college, earning a bachelor's bachelor's degree and master's degree in history, and a master's degree in communications.

== Military intelligence and first game designs ==
Following graduation, Bomba joined the military and spent eight years in military intelligence, four years with the U.S. Navy Intelligence, and then four more years working for the National Security Agency. At times between 1976 and 1988, Bomba held a security clearance as a certified Arabic and Russian linguist for the US Air Force, US Army, and the National Security Agency.

In his spare time, Bomba started to design wargames, and his first effort, West Wall, was published as a pull-out game in Issue 35 of The Wargamer (November 1984). West Wall was a double-blind game, in which both players had separate maps and counters and thus had little information about enemy dispositions and strengths. Bomba later admitted, "I designed it not realizing that given the psychology of most wargamers in the market, a game which cannot be played solitaire wouldn't be well received." The following year, Bomba's second wargame, End of the Iron Dream, was also published as a pull-out game in The Wargamer (June 1985). Bomba called his third Wargamer pull-out game, Dynamo: Dunkirk, 1940, the first design project "that immediately clicked."

== Strategy & Tactics ==
When Bomba left the military in 1988, Keith Poulter, president of Worldwide Wargames (3W), hired Bomba as the editor of Strategy & Tactics, which Poulter had just acquired from TSR. In addition to acting as editor of the magazine and Production Manager of 3W, Bomba continued to design games; The Tigers Are Burning: Campaigns for the Ukraine, 1943-44 appeared in Issue 118 of S&T and was a finalist for a Charles S. Roberts Award in the category "Best World War II Board Game of 1988." Bomba also spent many hours talking with fellow employees Larry Hoffman and Chris Perello about the state of the wargaming industry.

== XTR ==
In 1989, Bomba, Hoffman, and Perello left 3W to found their own game company, XTR, in order to publish the wargaming magazine Command. Reviews of the first issue and the pull-out game designed by Bomba, Blitzkrieg '41, were laudatory, with critic Charles Vasey predicting "a healthy future for this new venture." As well as acting as editor of Command, Bomba designed many of the pull-out games that appeared in Command, as well as boxed games published by XTR.

== After XTR ==
After Bomba left XTR, he became a senior editor at S&T Press. He left that position in 2014 to become editor of CounterFact, a wargaming magazine that specialized in alternative history and near-future "what-if?" wargame designs. He continued to design games at a rapid pace. By 2022, he had been credited with the design of over 160 wargames.

== Charles S. Roberts Awards ==
As per the "Charles S. Roberts Awards" website.

1988

- The Tigers Are Burning: Finalist for "Best World War II Board Game"
- Ty Bomba was the 1988 Inductee into the Charles Roberts Hall of Fame<

1989

- Blitzkrieg '41: Finalist for "Best World War II Board Game"
- Bomba was a finalist for the James F. Dunnigan Award for Playability and Design

1990

- Triumph of the Will: Nazi Germany vs. Imperial Japan, 1948: Finalist for "Best Historical or Scenario Article"
- Sunrise of Victory and Krim: von Manstein's Battles for Sevastopol: Both finalists for "Best World War II Board Game"
- NATO, Nukes & Nazis (with Joseph Miranda) and Mississippi Banzai: Both finalists for "Best Post-World War II Board Game"

1993

- Back to Iraq: Finalist for "Best World War II Board Game"

1994

- Proud Monster: The Barbarossa Campaign: Finalist for "Best World War II Board Game"

1995

- Proud Monster: The Barbarossa Campaign — Death & Destruction: The Russian Front 1942-44: Finalist for "Best World War II Board Game"
- Balkan Hell: Finalist for "Best Post-World War II Board Game"

1996

- Bomba was the winner of the James F. Dunnigan Award for Playability and Design

1999

- Iron Dream: Finalist for "Best Magazine-Published Boardgame"

2001

- When Dragons Fight: Winner of "Best Modern Era Boardgame"
- Back to Iraq (3rd edition, with Joseph Miranda): Finalist for "Best Modern Era Boardgame"
  - When Dragons Fight and Back to Iraq (3rd edition, with Joseph Miranda): Both were finalists for "Best Magazine-Published Boardgame"

2004

- Group of Soviet Forces Germany: Finalist for both "Best Modern Era Boardgame" and "Best Magazine-Published Boardgame"
