= Paper Wars =

Board game magazine

Paper Wars is a quarterly magazine originally published by Hexessential Publications and currently published by Compass Games that focuses on board wargames.

== History ==
The first issue, published by Rich Irwin and Hexessential Publications of Seattle, was titled Wargame Collector's Journal and was dated September/October 1991. Starting with Issue 9 (March 1993), the title changed to Paper Wars. Hexessential published the first 26 issues.

From Issue 27 to 76, the magazine was published by Omega Games. Compass Games, headquartered in Cromwell, CT, took over in September 2012 with Issue 77. The magazine's current editor is Ty Bomba.

A CD-ROM containing the first 26 issues was released in 2005.

== Contents ==
The focus of all articles in Paper Wars is board wargames, including reviews of new games, discussions of books of interest to wargamers, industry news, and variant scenarios for existing wargames. Since being taken over by Compass Games, the magazine features a complete pull-out board wargame in each issue.

== Reception ==
In Issue 5 of the French wargaming magazine Vae Victis, Théophile Monnier noted "a very understated presentation — not a single illustration to be found!" Monnier was surprised by the depth of content, pointing out "Paper Wars is more akin to a fanzine than a full-fledged magazine, yet it offers detailed analyses of all the latest releases. The most recent issue (No. 21) features over fifteen games." Monnier concluded, "It is an excellent resource for an American perspective on the current state of the historical wargaming hobby."

In the 2012 book Simulating War: Studying Conflict Through Simulation Games, Philip Sabine identified the reviews in Paper Wars as one of the few methods for disseminating information about new board wargames to players.

== Awards ==
In 1993 and again in 1994, Paper Wars won the Charles S. Roberts Award for "Best Amateur Wargame Magazine." It was a finalist for the same award in 1995 and 1996.
