= The Wargamer (magazine) =

Hobbyist magazine (1977–1990)

- Cover of the first issue (1977)
- Editor: Keith Poulter; Christopher Cummins
- Categories: Miniature Wargaming
- Frequency: Bi-monthly
- First issue: 1977
- Final issue Number: 1990; 25 of Volume 2
- Company: World Wide Wargames (3W)
- Country: United Kingdom; USA
- Website: The Wargamer Magazine compendium at The BoardGameGeek

The Wargamer was a magazine devoted to the hobby of board wargaming. Originally published as a British bimonthly magazine by UK Wargamers in 1977, it was subsequently published by World Wide Wargames, which then moved to the United States. The magazine ceased publication in 1990.

== History ==
Keith Poulter, a political science teacher in England, became interested in board wargames in 1975, and decided to produce a wargaming magazine as a hobby. In 1977 he founded UK Wargamers (UKW) in order publish The Wargamer. Like the American wargaming magazine Strategy & Tactics published by Simulations Publications Inc. (SPI), The Wargamer included a small pullout wargame in each issue. Although Poulter planned to make The Wargamer a bi-monthly magazine, he was only able to produce three issues by the end of 1977. He changed the name of the publishing company from UK Wargamers to World Wide Games (3W) and published quarterly for the next three years. Starting with Issue 13, the magazine was printed in Hong Kong, which Poulter recalled causing "notorious difficulties." The magazine was successful enough that Poulter resigned from teaching to concentrate on 3W, which by this time was also producing boxed wargames. Reviewer Roger Musson compared The Wargamer to its American counterparts, and found that it resembled a mix of two SPI magazines: Strategy & Tactics, with its free wargame in every issue, and Moves with its game-related articles, reviews, hobby news and information.

In 1982, the magazine went from quarterly to bimontly, and two years later increased to monthly. That same year, SPI was taken over by TSR, and although TSR continued to publish SPI's magazines for a time, the company eventually sold Strategy & Tactics and Moves to 3W. Since both S&T and The Wargamer had very similar content, the decision was made to cease publication of The Wargamer with Issue 62 (February 1987) and continue on with Strategy & Tactics. Poulter also decided to discontinue publication of Moves, but Christopher Cummins approached Poulter about reviving Moves. Poulter agreed to restart Moves, but with the title The Wargamer. The new magazine now carried reviews and hobby news. To differentiate the "old" Wargamer from the new Warmgamer and its change of editorial direction, the old Wargamers from Issue 1 to Issue 62 were retroactively referred to as "Volume 1". All subsequent issues of the new Wargamer were referred to as "Volume 2".

At about the same time, 3W acquired Diverse Talents Inc., who published Fire & Movement, Battleplan and Space Gamer/Fantasy Gamer.

With so many wargaming magazines now being produced by 3W, the staff felt that Volume 2 of The Wargamer was not distinct enough, and in June 1990, Volume 2 of The Wargamer ceased publication with Issue 25.

== Reception ==
In Issue 26 of Phoenix, Roger Musson compared Issue 11 of The Wargamer to Issue 4, and thought Issue 11 was a much improved and much more professional product. He concluded, "to those who have not yet seen The Wargamer, I would strongly recommend that you rectify this situation as quickly as possible."

In Issue 21 of the British wargaming magazine Perfidious Albion, Charles Vasey questioned the magazine's focus, writing that The Wargamer "can't decide whether it is a club-zine or an independent feature zine." But Ian Watters disagreed, writing, "The Wargamer is worth the money I paid for it — ten articles, some good, some bad, that included a cardstock map, about 130 nine-colour counters — thinner but still usable — that makes an exciting game."

== Awards ==
At the 1985 Origins Awards, The Wargamer was awarded the Charles S. Roberts Award for "Best Professional Boardgaming Magazine of 1984".
