= Nick Palmer =

British Labour politician

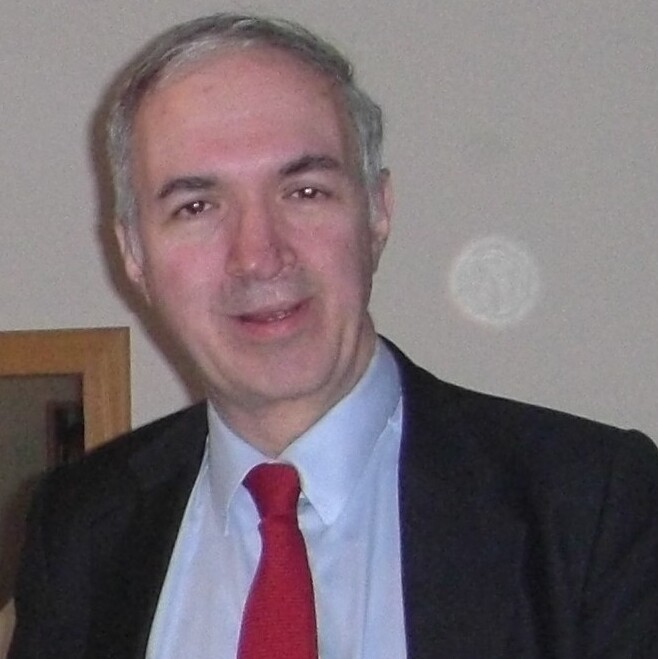

Member of Parliament for Broxtowe
- In office 1 May 1997 – 12 April 2010
- Preceded by: Jim Lester
- Succeeded by: Anna Soubry

Personal details
- Born: 5 February 1950 (age 76) City of Westminster, London, England
- Party: Labour
- Education: Copenhagen University; Birkbeck, University of London; Massachusetts Institute of Technology
- Occupation: Medical computing
- Profession: Computer scientist

Nicholas Douglas Palmer (born 5 February 1950) is a British politician, translator and computer scientist. He was the Labour Party Member of Parliament (MP) for Broxtowe in Nottinghamshire from 1997 until he lost the seat at the 2010 general election to Conservative Anna Soubry, by 390 votes.

Described by Andrew Roth as "quietly effective", he was Parliamentary Private Secretary (PPS) to the Minister of State, Margaret Beckett, in the Department for Environment, Food and Rural Affairs until April 2005. He then became PPS to the Minister of State, Malcolm Wicks, first in the Department of Trade and Industry, and later in the Department for Business, Enterprise and Regulatory Reform until Wicks stood down in October 2008.

== Early life ==
Palmer's father was a translator/editor and his mother was a language teacher. He is the cousin of Anthony Palmer, a former Deputy Chief of the Defence Staff.

Palmer attended International Schools in Copenhagen and Vienna. He was awarded an MSc at Copenhagen University and a PhD in Mathematics from Birkbeck College, University of London. He also studied at Massachusetts Institute of Technology (MIT) where he researched artificial intelligence and language translation.

== Professional life ==
Palmer speaks six languages, and has worked as a professional translator of Danish and German for the European Commission and other clients.

He was born with a cleft palate and was the first such person to enter Parliament.

As a computer scientist, he developed the COMPACT clinical trials package for the Medical Research Council. Joining the Swiss pharmaceutical firm Ciba-Geigy, he became head of Novartis Internet Service when Ciba-Geigy merged with Sandoz to form Novartis.

== Board and computer wargames ==
Palmer has written three books about board wargames (The Comprehensive Guide to Board Wargaming (1977), The Best of Board Wargaming (1980), and Beyond the Arcade: Adventures and Wargames on Your Computer (1984)). He designed and developed a computer game about the Battle of Britain, named Their Finest Hour. Palmer still attends international conventions, winning the Diplomacy championship at the World Boardgaming Championships in 2007, as well as giving a seminar in 2008 comparing the traits needed to succeed in wargaming to the traits needed to succeed in politics.

He co-founded and edited Flagship magazine in 1983, which focused on play-by-mail games. A keen card player, he has represented the House of Commons at bridge.

== Parliamentary career ==
Palmer joined the Labour Party on his twenty-first birthday and was selected as the Labour candidate for the ultra-safe Conservative seat of Chelsea in the 1983 general election, as well as contesting the East Sussex and Kent South seat at the 1994 elections to the European Parliament. Prior to contesting Broxtowe, he edited and published a magazine to represent the views of ordinary Labour party members – Grass Roots.

=== Legislation and Committee Work ===
While an MP, he served on a number of Select committees including the European Scrutiny Committee, the Northern Ireland Affairs Committee, and the Treasury Committee. and also served as a member of the Justice Committee.

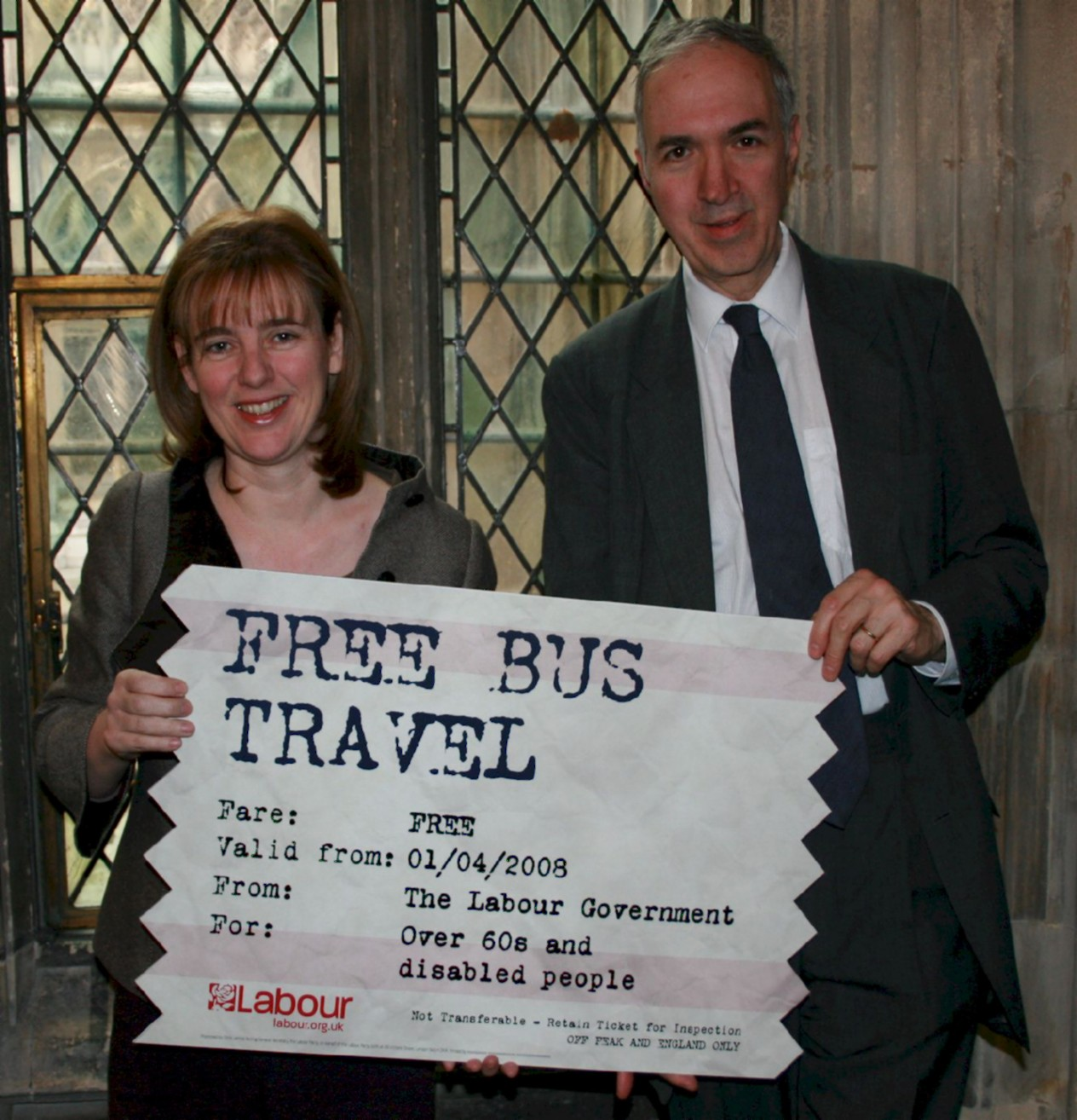
Nick Palmer with the then Secretary of State for Transport, Ruth Kelly, launching free bus travel.

He suggested TV Licence exemption for over-75s which was then adopted by the government, along with similar measures like free bus passes for the elderly.

In January 1998, Palmer introduced a bill under the Ten Minute Rule, amending the Firearms act 1968 and raising the age for possession of air weapons, especially to prevent malicious use against pets.

In April 2000, he introduced a private member's bill to presume consent for organ donation, a measure still being considered which could increase transplants by 25%.

In January 2002, he introduced a 10-minute rule bill advocating Identity Cards which was adopted by the Government. He subsequently brokered a deal to get the government's version through the Lords.

He campaigned for five years for bells to be fitted to all new bicycles in response to a petition from his constituents. A bill was passed making them compulsory from 1 May 2004.

He introduced a bill about fine print, requiring a minimum size of print in documents, especially those relating to advertising and contracts.

In December 2005, he introduced another 10-minute rule bill intended to ensure speed camera warning signs displayed the limit they enforced.

In May 2008, he introduced an amendment to the Human Fertilisation and Embryology Act 1990 requiring that "strictly neutral information" be provided in cases of foetal abnormality. This was based on his parents' experience of the expert advice from pioneering surgeon Archibald McIndoe who successfully reconstructed his cleft palate.

He gave speeches in the Commons on animal welfare issues and in December 2009 he was one of 8 cross-party supporters of a bill introduced by Nigel Waterson to "make provision for residents of care homes and sheltered accommodation to keep domestic pets in certain circumstances."

Based on his experience as a computer software developer, he spoke against the terms of the Digital Economy Bill and joined Tom Watson and Austin Mitchell in leading a Labour rebellion against its third reading.

=== Interest Groups ===
Palmer belonged to an All-Party Parliamentary Group on Animal Welfare, Fund for the Replacement of Animals in Medical Experiments (FRAME) and World Government. He is a member of the East Midlands Labour Group and serves on the Executive of the Labour Friends of Israel. He helped organise the visit of the Dalai Lama to Britain in 2008, organising meetings and a special exhibit of a mandala in the House of Commons.

With his secretary, Philipa Coughlan (with sons Nick and Sean) and fellow MP, Liz Blackman, he compiled a book of recipes favoured by MPs. For example, Tony Blair's recipe was for Meatball and Tomato Sauce while speaker Betty Boothroyd preferred Stewed Oxtail. Nick Palmer's own recipe was for Swiss-style potatoes – Berner Roesti.

=== Constituency ===
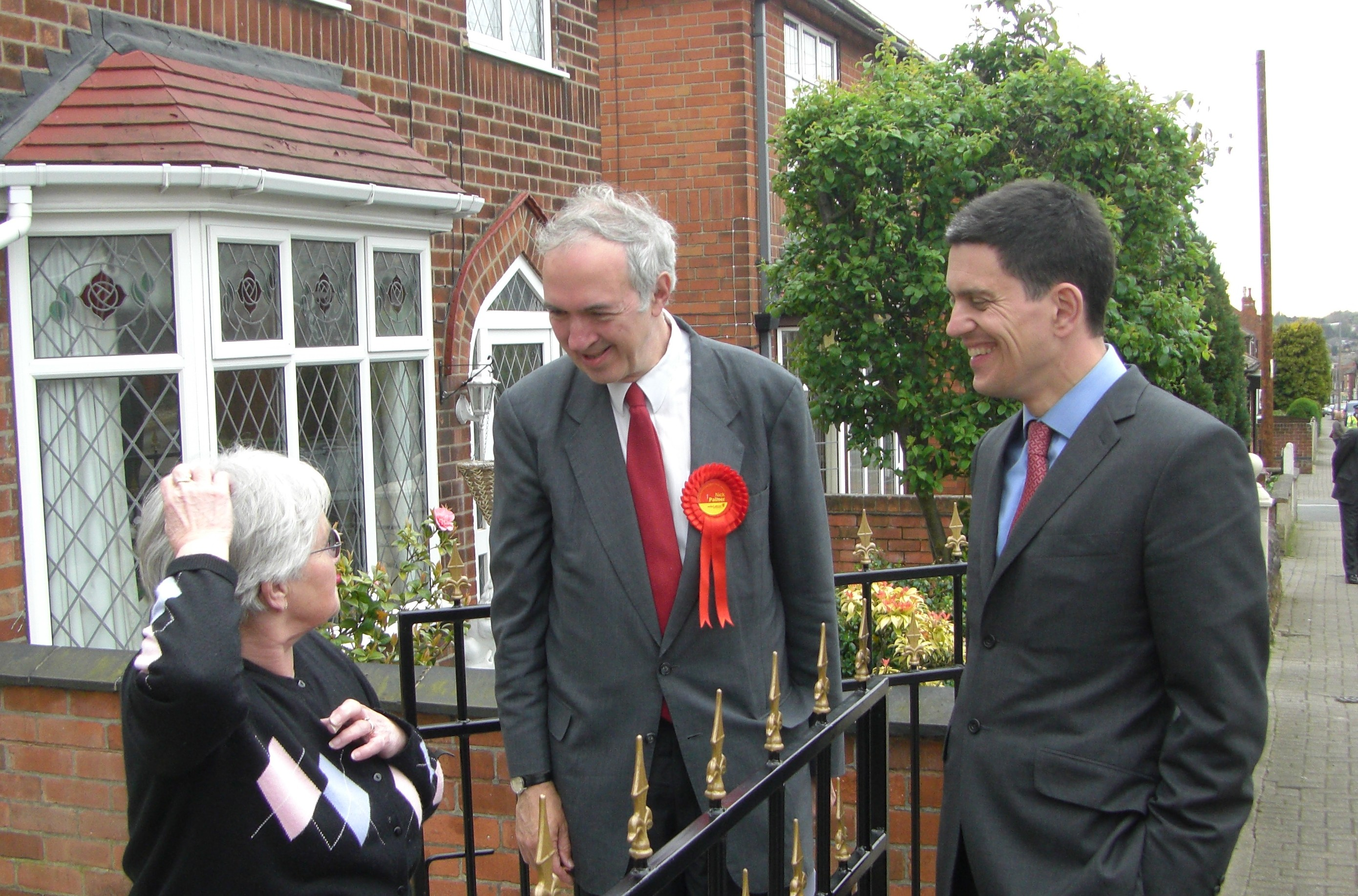
Nick Palmer canvassing with David Miliband in Stapleford in the 2010 election

Palmer was one of many new Labour MPs elected in what was a landslide election for Labour in 1997. He held the seat comfortably with an increased majority at the 2001 election, and again with a reduced majority in 2005 election. An opinion piece suggested that part of the reason that Palmer had held his seat was due to his high constituency work rate. In the 2010 election, the seat was lost to the Conservative candidate Anna Soubry, reflecting a national swing.

While an MP, he responded to a "very high" percentage of constituents' letters, addressing matters of local concern such as open-cast mining and the development of the local Nottingham tramway and in February 2008 he asked about "proposals to build on virtually the entire green belt" in Broxtowe at Prime Minister's Questions. In June 2008 he asked the Department for Transport about the second phase of the tram/train trials. He campaigned for and organised a bus service to link Kimberley with the Nottingham tram at Phoenix Park.

== Post-parliamentary career ==
A month after losing his seat in the 2010 general election, Palmer became the first ex-MP to sign on for unemployment benefit. He said this was partly to keep his national insurance contributions continuous and partly to explore for himself what the unemployment services are like. Palmer described the experience as sensitive but said he had received plenty of helpful suggestions and was favourably impressed. In September 2010, he became Director of International and Corporate Affairs for the BUAV.

In September 2011 Palmer contributed to the book What next for Labour?. He wrote two pieces, one entitled "Student Fees: A Constructive Response" and the other "Animal Welfare: The Neglected Swing Issue". He is the patron of Cats Protection. In August 2010, pursuing his interest in animal welfare, he joined the Cruelty Free International as their Director of International and Corporate Relations. He then joined Compassion in World Farming to head the UK branch of the charity which campaigns for the welfare of farm animals.

He stood again for the Broxtowe seat at the 2015 general election but failed to regain the seat. In September 2016 he intervened in the leadership battle between Jeremy Corbyn and Owen Smith. Palmer described himself as one who considered the 1997–2010 Labour government as 'very successful' but 'blighted by the disaster of Iraq'. He called on members and parliamentarians to give Corbyn a 'decent chance'.

On 2 May 2019, he was elected to Waverley Borough Council in the Godalming Binscombe Ward. He led the Labour group on the council and chaired the local party, receiving an award for endurance on the 50th anniversary of his party membership. He resigned from Waverley Council in August 2024 where he was said to have been "one of the most popular Waverley members".

Parliament of the United Kingdom
Preceded by Jim Lester	Member of Parliament for Broxtowe; 1997–2010	Succeeded by Anna Soubry
