= Moves (magazine) =

Board game magazine

- Editor: Jim Dunnigan (founder)
- Categories: Board Wargaming
- Frequency: Monthly
- First issue: February 1972
- Final issue Number: December 1981 #60 (original magazine) (restarted in 1991)
- Company: SPI until 1981; Decision Games since 1991
- Country: United States
- Website: Moves issues compendium by Greg Costikyan

Moves was a wargaming magazine originally published by SPI (Simulations Publications, Inc.), which also published manual wargames. Their flagship magazine Strategy & Tactics (S&T), was a military history magazine featuring a new wargame in each issue. While S&T was devoted to historical articles, Moves focused on the play of the games. Each issue carried articles dealing with strategies for different wargames, tactical tips, and many variants and scenarios for existing games. As time passed, reviews of new games also became an important feature. While the majority of the articles dealt with SPI games, the magazine was open to and published many articles on games by other companies.

Founded by Jim Dunnigan, Moves began publication in 1972. SPI carried a huge inventory of their games and was very successful as a direct mail marketer of their games. But with the rise of role-playing games and multimillion-dollar sales for that arm of gaming, SPI expanded into hobby shops and increased its market. However, retail meant significantly higher print runs and lower margins, and with the rapid inflation of the 1970s, the rise in paper costs put them in a financial bind. When the recession of 1980-81 hit, the company found itself short of cash and unable to continue without a loan. TSR appeared to be a savior, making the loan a promissory note, but then reversed course and demanded payment. Moves were among the assets acquired by TSR. The final issue (#60) of the original run was published in December 1981.

A second run of issues began publication in 1991 with issue #61, when 3W ceased publication of The Wargamer in favor of restarting the well-known Moves title. It was bought, along with Fire & Movement and Strategy & Tactics, by Decision Games and continued publishing into the 21st Century.

== Editors ==
- James F. Dunnigan: Number 13 (Feb/Mar 1974) - Number 14 (April/May 1974)
- Howard Barasch: Number 15 (June/July 1974) - 23 (October/November 1975)
- Redmond A. Simonsen: Number 25 (February/March 1976) - 57 (June/July 1981)
- Jeff Albanese: Number 64 (August–September 1991) - 65 (October 1991)
- Christopher R. Cummins: Number 103 (Feb/Mar 2001) - 108 (Spring 2002)

== Reviews ==
- Perfidious Albion #9 (September 1976) p. 19
- Perfidious Albion #10 (October 1976) p. 17
- Perfidious Albion #12 (December 1976) p. 14
- Perfidious Albion #15 (March 1977) p.17
- Perfidious Albion #16 (April 1977) p.16
- Perfidious Albion #17 (May 1977) p.19
- Perfidious Albion #19 (July 1977) p.17
- Perfidious Albion #20 (April 1977) p.17
- Perfidious Albion #22 (November 1977) p.5
- Perfidious Albion #26 (March 1978) p.11
- Perfidious Albion #28 (May 1978) p.13
- Perfidious Albion #29 (July 1978) p.11
- Perfidious Albion #30 (August 1978) p.17
- Perfidious Albion #33 (November 1978) p.17
- Perfidious Albion #38 (April 1979) p.17
- Perfidious Albion #45 (February 1980) p.19
- Perfidious Albion #46 (May 1980) p.19
- Perfidious Albion #48 (October 1980) p.19
