= Strategy & Tactics =

Wargaming magazine

- S&T issue 68 cover
- Categories: Wargaming magazine
- Publisher: 1967–69: Chris Wagner; 1969–1982: SPI; 1982–1987: TSR; 1987–1991: 3W; 1991–Present: Decision Games
- First issue: January 1967
- Country: United States
- Website: www.strategyandtacticspress.com/wpsite/

Strategy & Tactics (S&T) is a wargaming magazine that has had several publishers. It was first published in 1967 by Chris Wagner, and then by Simulations Publications Inc. (SPI), who notably began to include a free wargame with every issue. After the demise of SPI, ownership passed to TSR, and then to 3W, before the magazine was acquired by Decision Games.

== Beginnings ==
In 1967, Chris Wagner was serving in Japan as a staff sergeant with the US Air Force. Wagner, an avid wargamer, wanted to create a better alternative to Avalon Hill's house magazine, The General, and in January 1967 he published the first issue of a fanzine titled Strategy & Tactics. While Wagner served in Japan, sales were limited to fellow servicemen in Japan. The magazine began to circulate in the United States when Wagner returned home.

Wagner hired graphic designer Redmond Simonsen to improve the quality of the magazine. However, when subscriptions stagnated, debts began to accumulate.

Jim Dunnigan, who had designed several games for Avalon Hill, had also been contributing articles to S&T since Issue 2 (February 1967). He disagreed with Avalon Hill's policy of only producing one or two expensive wargames per year, and had been toying with the idea of forming a company to produce many cheaper wargames every year. When Dunnigan heard about S&T's financial issues, he decided to form Poultron Press to test-market a series of cheaply produced wargames. Needing a house magazine, he also bought the rights to S&T from Chris Wagner for $1. (In an interview printed in S&T #83 (The Kaiser's Battle), Wagner confirmed this sale, and mentioned that Dunnigan had not paid him the $1 until much later.)

== Simulations Publications Inc. ==
Dunnigan set up Poultron Press in a building in New York City's Lower East Side, where he published his first issue of S&T, #18 (September 1969); it included the free small pull-out wargame Crete. Thereafter, the magazine was published six times a year, and every issue included a free small wargame.

Dunnigan's series of test games sold well, and he changed the name of the company to Simulations Publications Inc. (SPI) as he geared up to publish large boxed wargames. Planning to use S&T to promote these new games, he hired Albert Nofi as associate editor of S&T. The magazine's hallmark became detailed historical background articles about the wargames SPI was producing. Circulation of the magazine became substantial.

In 1972, SPI published a spin-off magazine, Moves, which focused more on how to play the wargames SPI was producing. By the mid-1970s, S&T's circulation exceeded that of Avalon Hill's The General.

In the late 1970s, SPI's sales started to decline despite annual income declared at two million dollars, as inflation caused financial pressure on the company. Dunnigan departed, as did SPI's marketing manager Howard Barasch. In the early 1980s, the bottom fell out of the wargame market; this, combined with poor management decisions such as publishing the Dallas role-playing game and an unfortunate turn with venture capitalists, caused the company's financial situation to worsen. Negotiations began with Avalon Hill and then TSR for a buy-out, but neither was interested.

In 1982, SPI negotiated a promissory note loan of $400,000 from TSR that was secured by SPI's assets. SPI used the cash to pay their debts but less than two weeks later, TSR called in the note. SPI, with no cash available and no options to get the funds, were forced to hand the company over to TSR.

== TSR ==
TSR immediately shut down Moves but continued to publish S&T, although it refused to honor current S&T subscriptions.

TSR published S&T from issue #91 (Winter 1983) to issue #111 (1987). During that time, the wargame market did not recover, and TSR's acquisition of SPI failed to produce the revenue stream that TSR had expected. After five years, TSR got out of the wargame business, selling S&T to 3W, a small company that published rival magazine The Wargamer.

== 3W ==
3W published the magazine from #112 (June 1987) to #139. Keith Poulter was the editor from issues #112 to #119, Ty Bomba from #120 to #129, and James Dunnigan returned to be the editor from #130 to #139. Although circulation began to increase again, subscriptions never recovered fully, and most magazine sales were made through game stores and not subscriptions, which meant third party retailers took a share of the profits.

== Decision Games ==
3W's Keith Poulter later left the business, and in 1991 S&T was sold to Decision Games, starting with issue #140 (February 1991). Since issue #176 (September/October 1995), Decision Games has also offered a newsstand version at a lower price without the wargame that comes in subscription issues. According to the official website, "by issue #216, more copies of the magazine edition were being produced than the game edition." In 2003, Decision Games spun off Strategy & Tactics Press as a sister company for magazine and media development.

== Reception ==
During the mid-1970s, when S&T was published by SPI, Charles Vasey reviewed several issues in the British wargaming magazine Perfidious Albion:

- Issue 53: "This issue is worth getting"; Vasey especially liked its article on the Thirty Years War.
- Issue 56: "The last historical article is a very very good history of the War in Angola [with] a very nice (if cluttered) map to accompany the article ... Altogether this issue was one of the best magazines that SPI have produced for some time."
- Issue 57: "It's hard to remember the old S&T I used to subscribe to when you see their new colour maps and flashy production."
- Issue 77: "Steve Donaldson does an excellent job on Cityfight's article with some very clever subtitles. The best-written piece in S&T for some time."
- Issue 80: "Not really very exciting these days ... All too slick by half."
- Issue 87: "The first article by Al Nofi rehashes most of the old rubbish [from] back in the mid-70s ... This issue has a notably ridiculous article on the Swiss at War ... Some reasonable reviews as well. A microcosm of SPI's ills and strengths."

Chicago Tribune columnist Roger Verhulst called it "a publication aimed at the specialist — the serious wargamer who is willing to work at his play ... no serious wargamer — actual or potential — should be without it." Verhulst concluded, "these magazines aren't going to appeal to just anyone; they obviously don't attempt to. But if you're one of these whose interest in wargaming has gone beyond the merely casual, these are for you."

In Issue 32 of Abyss, Dave Nalle reviewed the magazine under TSR ownership and was not impressed, noting, "It doesn't seem to have the flash of the old S&T." Nalle thought the best part of the magazine was now Richard Berg's column, calling it "interesting and somewhat useful ... As might be expected, Berg's material is the best in the magazine." Nalle concluded by giving the magazine an overall rating of 4 out of 10, saying, " I'd recommend S&T to avid hardcore wargamers ... For those with a softer interest, it is of limited value."

=== Awards ===
Strategy & Tactics won thirteen Charles S. Roberts/Origins Awards between 1974 and 2009, and in 1997 the magazine was inducted into the Adventure Gaming Hall of Fame.

== See also ==
- For Your Eyes Only
