= 3M bookshelf game series =

Series of board games and card games

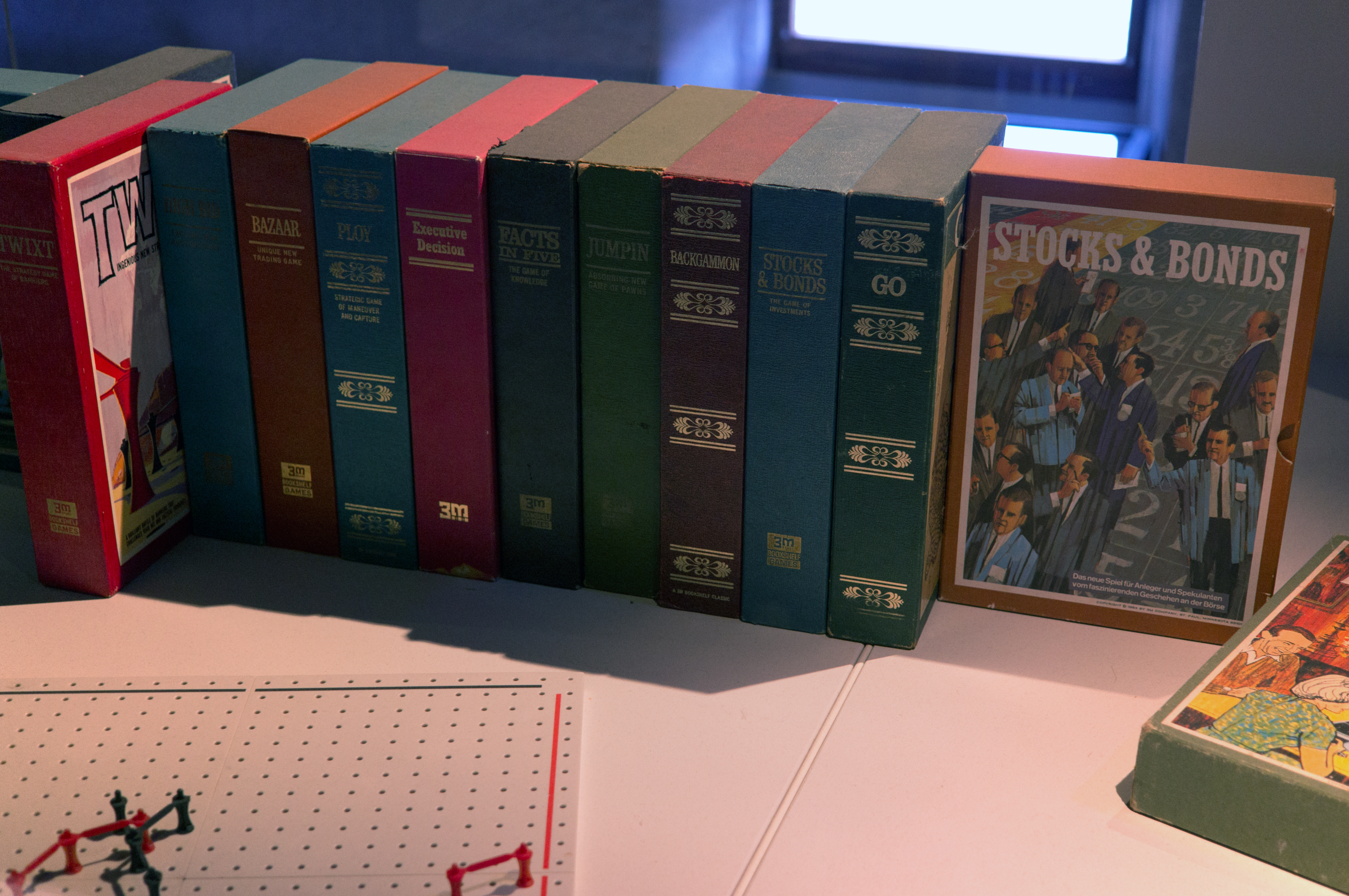
Several 3M bookshelf games in the Swiss Museum of Games (2014)

The 3M bookshelf game series is a set of strategy and economic games published in the 1960s and early 1970s by 3M Corporation. The games were packaged in leatherette-look large hardback book size boxes in contrast to the prevalent wide, flat game boxes. The series grew to encompass over three dozen games. Most were multi-player board games or card games; a few were trivia games or two-handed board games. Acquire and TwixT were among the best-selling titles. The series later became part of the Avalon Hill Bookcase games. Very few of these games are still being published.

The line consisted of republished classics such as Go, chess and backgammon as well as original games. The Bookshelf games were originally in large boxes that were 8.5 by 12 by 2.25 inches (216 mm × 305 mm × 57 mm); later, a series in smaller boxes called "gamettes" was introduced. The early ones were packaged in a different shape box called a "butterbox".

== History ==
In 1962, 3M commissioned game designers Alex Randolph and Sid Sackson to design the early games. They were largely responsible for shaping the direction of the line towards abstract strategy and economic games. Randolph eventually produced TwixT, Oh-Wah-Ree, Breakthru, Evade, Jati, and Mad Mate. Sackson contributed Acquire, Bazaar, Monad, Executive Decision, Sleuth, and Venture. 3M thereafter relied extensively on freelance designers for the later bookshelf games. Between 400 and 600 submissions were received every year by the company. A few of the more popular games with established sales were acquired from other companies.

The games were produced by 3M from 1962 to 1975, under the complete company name, The Minnesota Mining & Manufacturing Company.

By the mid-1970s, gaming trends had shifted to pen-and-paper role playing games, and the 3M game division was suffering losses. In 1976, the entire line was sold to Avalon Hill, which produced a competing line of bookcase games. Avalon Hill discontinued most of them but continued to publish some until 1998, when it was sold by its parent company to Hasbro. While Acquire was mildly re-themed and published by Hasbro/Avalon Hill in 2000, the company has indicated that they have no plans to publish any of the 3M or Avalon Hill bookshelf games.

Since 2008, Acquire has been published by the Hasbro subsidiary Wizards of the Coast. TwixT has been published by a succession of German companies including Schmidt Spiele and Kosmos under license.

A few of the games that were not acquired by Hasbro, such as Facts in Five and Executive Decision, have since been published by University Games in a bookshelf format. Like the 3M series, they are designed to mimic the appearance of a large hardcover book, but instead of a slip-case, the games use a magnetic closing flap.

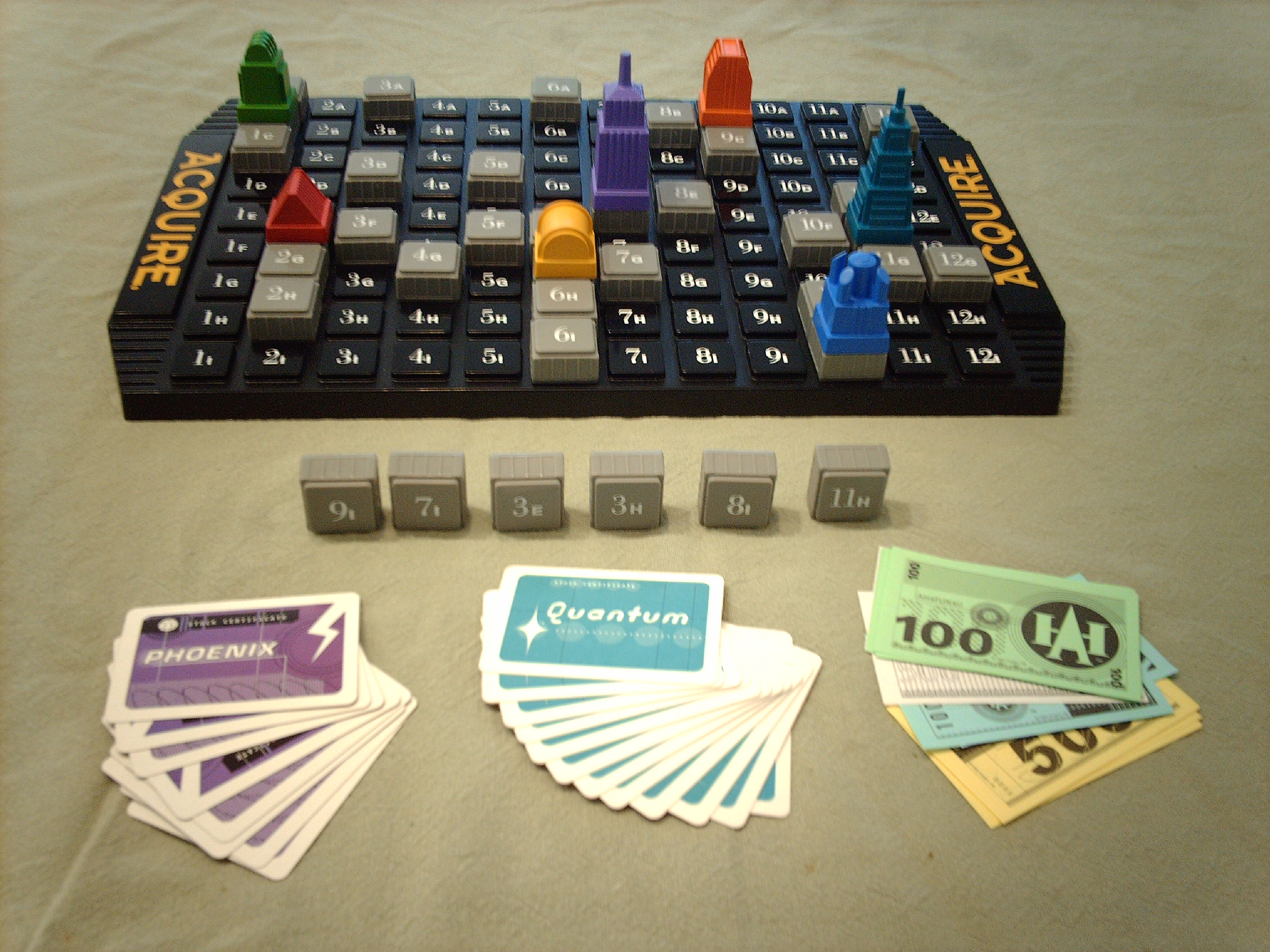
Acquire

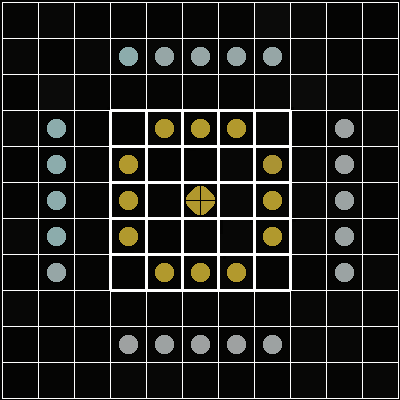
Breakthru

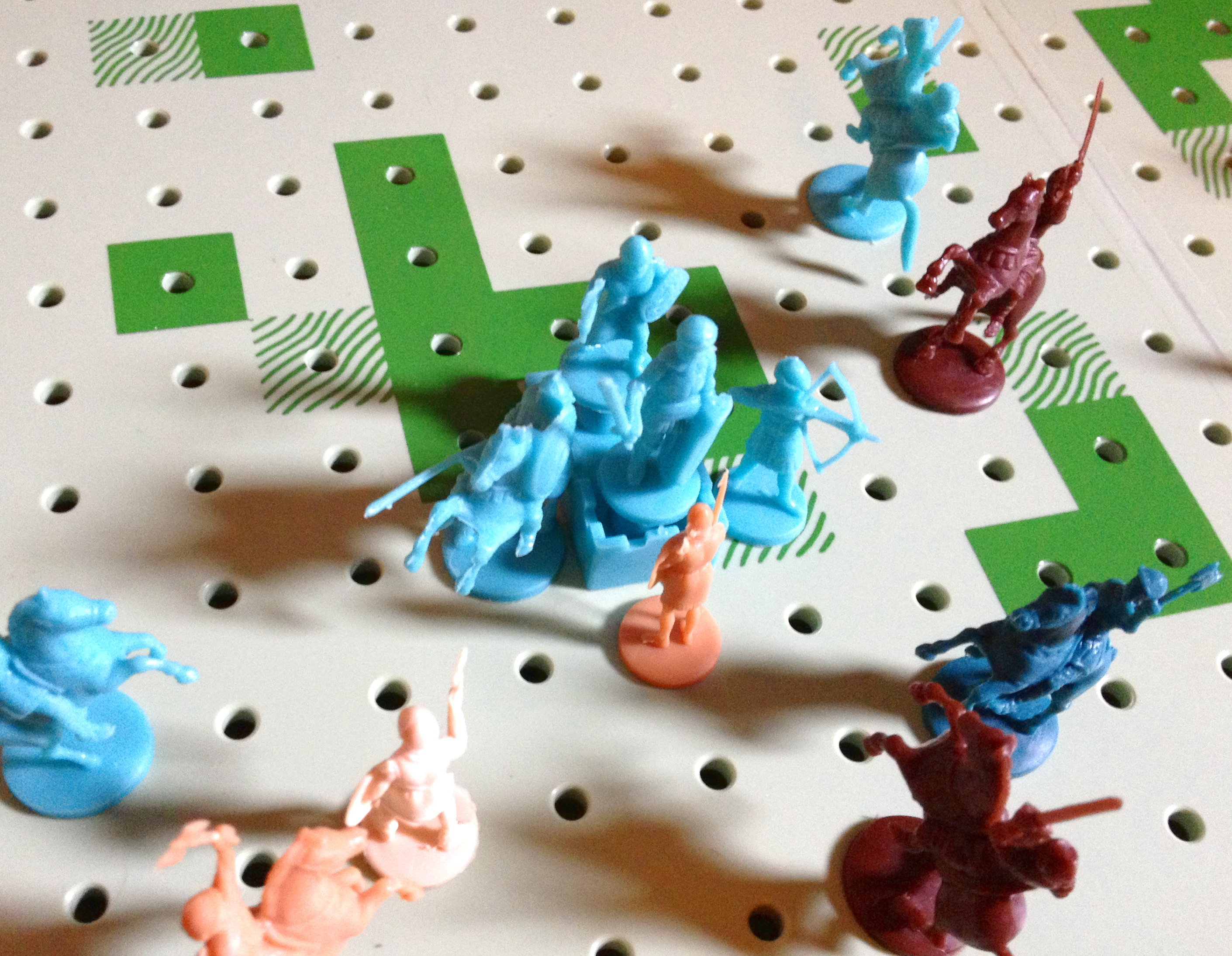
Feudal

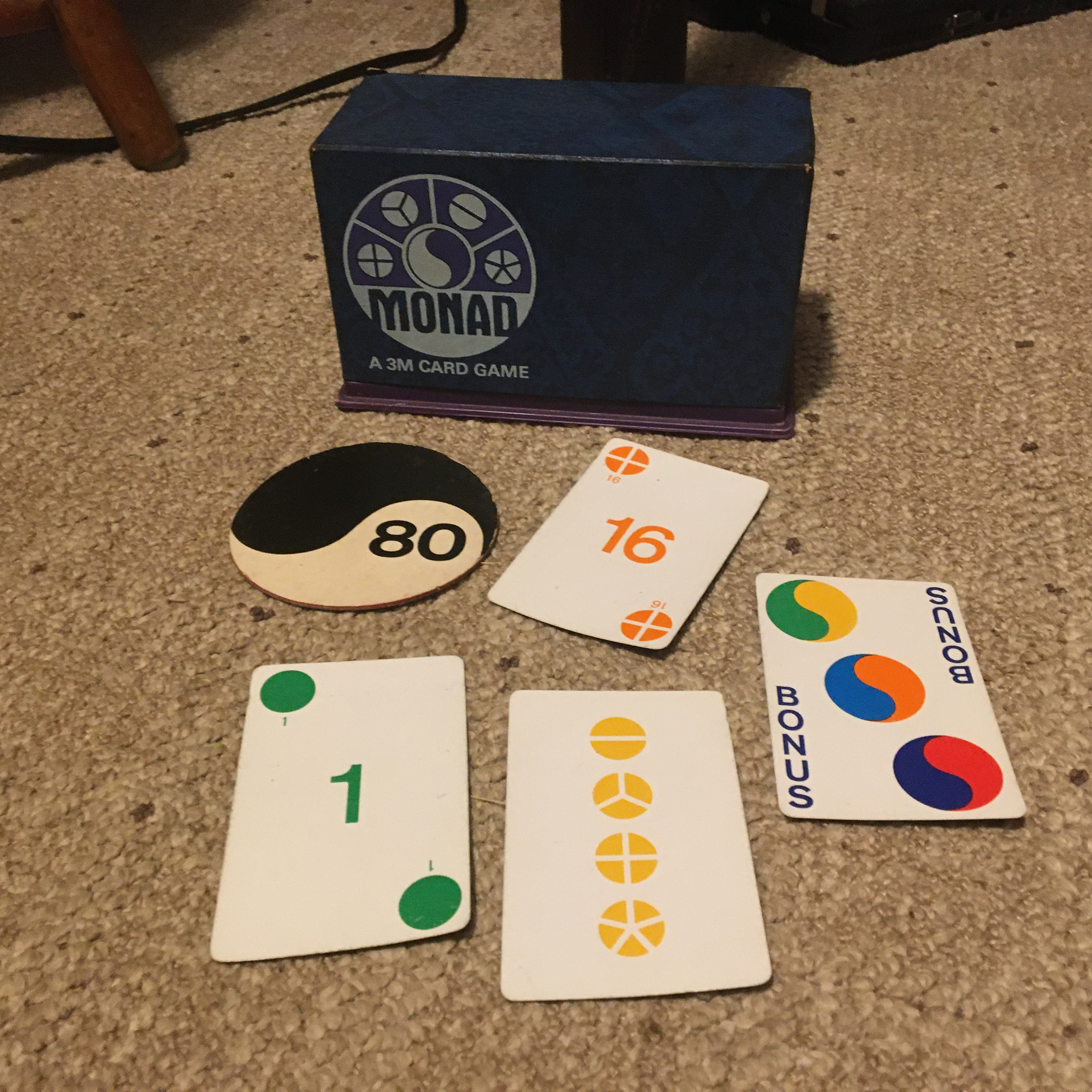
Monad cards and gamette box

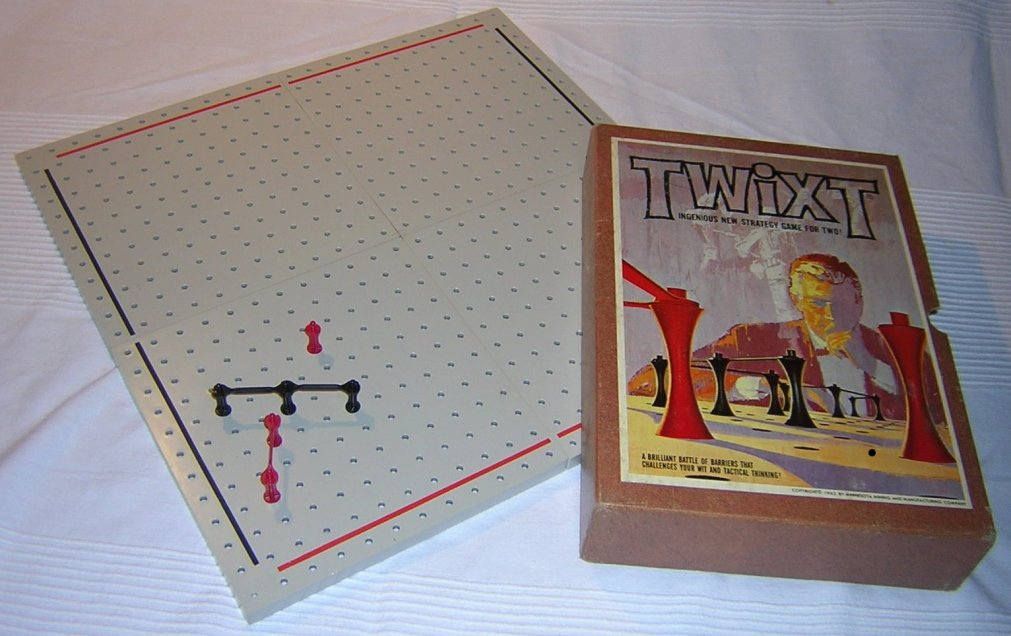
TwixT board and bookshelf box

== List of games ==
The bookshelf games series included the following games:

Unpublished games

- Options (1970), a game similar to Scrabble using number tiles instead of letters
- Mad Mate, also known as Crazyhouse, a chess variant
- Jati (1965), a 2-handed board game (prototype only)

Bookshelf series

- Acquire (1964), 2–6 player board game
- Backgammon, 2 player board game
- Bazaar 2 (1967), 6 player token trading game
- Blue Line Hockey (1968), 2 player board game
- Breakthru (1965), {Hnefatafl} 2 player board game
- Challenge Bridge (1973), {contract bridge} 4 player tournament simulation card game
- Challenge Football (1973), 2 player simulation dice/card game
- Challenge Golf at Pebble Beach (1973), 1–4 player simulation dice game
- Chess 2 player board game
- Contigo {Mancala} (1974), 2–4 player board game
- Events (1974), 4–8 player trivia game
- Executive Decision (1971), 2–6 player board game
- Facts in Five (1964), 2+ player trivia game
- Feudal (1967), 2 or 4 sides, 2–6 player board game
- Foil (1968), 2–4 player card game
- Go, 2 player board game
- High-Bid (1963), 2–5 player card and dice game
- Image (1971), 2–6 player card game
- Jumpin (1964), 2 player board game
- Mr. President (1967) 2–4 player simulation card game
- Oh-Wah-Ree (1962), {Mancala} 2–4 player board game
- Phlounder (1962), 2–6 player board game
- Ploy (1970), 2 or 4 player board game
- Point of Law (1972), 2+ player trivia game
- Quinto (1964), 2–4 player board game
- Stocks & Bonds (1964), 2–8 player card game
- TwixT (1962), 2 player board game

Gamette series

- Evade 2 player board game
- Foil 2–4 player card game
- High-Bid 2–4 player dice and card game
- Monad 2–4 player card game
- Octrix {contract bridge} 2–4 player card game
- Sleuth card game
- Sum Up 2–8 player card game
- Tryce {rummy} 3–6 player card game
- Venture 2–6 player card game

Notes:

1. Foil and High-Bid were both full size bookshelf games and gamette games.
2. If a game was a recognizable derivative of a classic game, the name of the classic game is in braces
3. Games where a board is not essential for play are classified as card games or trivia games

== See also ==
- Eurogame, a style of gaming of which Acquire was a popular example
- List of Avalon Hill games, which the 3M games became part of
