= Acquire =

Business themed board game

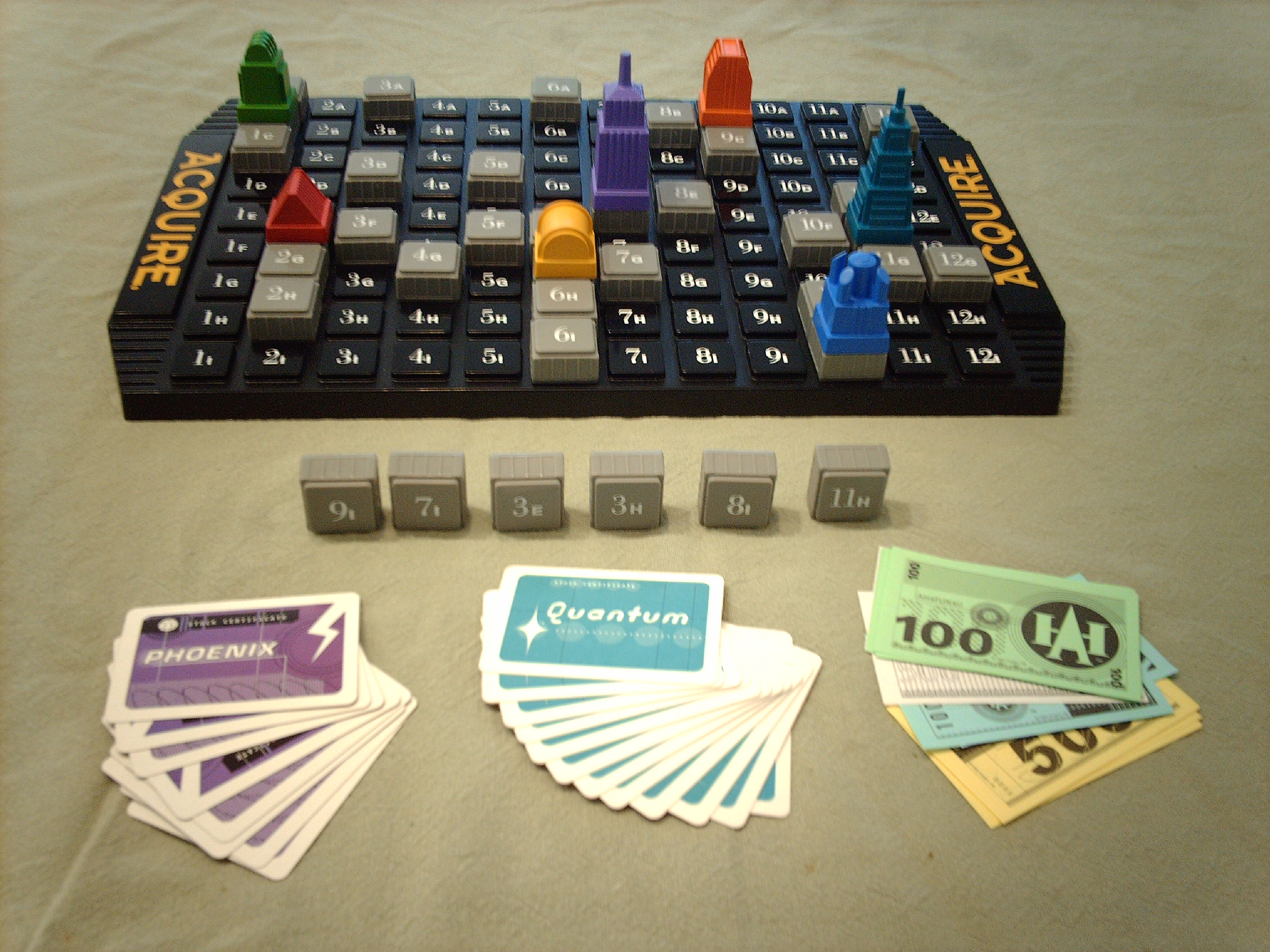
- The 1999 Hasbro version of Acquire
- Designers: Sid Sackson
- Publishers: Hasbro
- Publication: 1964; 62 years ago
- Players: 2–6
- Setup time: 5 minutes
- Playing time: 90 minutes
- Chance: Tile drawing
- Skills: Tile laying, resource management

Acquire is a board game published by 3M in 1964 that involves multi-player mergers and acquisitions. It was one of the most popular games in the 3M bookshelf games series published in the 1960s, and the only one still published in the United States.

== Description ==
Acquire is a board game for 2–6 players in which players attempt to earn the most money by developing and merging hotel chains. When a chain in which a player owns stock is acquired by a larger chain, players earn money based on the size of the acquired chain. At the end of the game, all players liquidate their stock in order to determine which player has the most money. It is played with play money, stock certificates, and tiles representing hotels that are arranged on the board. The components of the game have varied over the years. In particular, the tiles have been made from wood, plastic, and cardboard in various editions of the game.

=== Set up ===
Before play begins, the players must decide whether the numbers of players' shares will be public or private information. Keeping this information private can greatly extend the game since players will be less certain of their status, and therefore less willing to end the game.

Each player receives play cash and a small random set of playing tiles and becomes the founder of a nascent hotel chain by drawing and placing a tile representing a hotel on the board. Tiles are ordered, and correspond to spaces on the board. Position of the starting tiles determines order of play.

=== Gameplay ===
Play consists of placing a tile on the board and optionally buying stock. The placed tile may found a new hotel chain, grow an existing one or merge two or more chains. Chains are sets of edge-wise adjacent tiles. Founders receive a share of stock in new chains. A chain can become "safe", immune to acquisition, by attaining a specified size. Following placement of a tile, the player may then buy a limited number of shares of stock in existing chains. Shares have a market value determined by the size and stature of the hotel chain. At the end of his or her turn, the player receives a new tile to replace the one played.

When mergers occur, the smaller chain becomes defunct, and its tiles are then part of the acquiring chain. The two largest shareholders in the acquired chain receive cash bonuses; players may sell their shares in the defunct chain, trade them in for shares of the acquiring chain, or keep them. Mergers between 3 or more chains are handled in order from larger to smaller.

=== Ending the game ===
A player during their turn may declare the game at an end if the largest chain exceeds a specified size (about 40% of the board), or all chains on the board are too large to be acquired. When the game ends, shareholder bonuses are paid to the two largest shareholders of each chain, and players cash out their shares at market price (shares in any defunct chains are worthless). The player with the most money wins.

== Publication history ==
When Sid Sackson was a child, he played a Milton Bradley gambling-themed board game titled Lotto. When he became a game designer, Sackson reworked the game into a wargame he called Lotto War. In 1962, Sackson and Alex Randolph were commissioned by 3M to start a new games division. When Sackson submitted Lotto War to 3M the following year, he retitled the game Vacation. 3M suggested changing the name to Acquire, and Sackson agreed. The game was test marketed in several U.S. cities in 1963, and production began in 1964 as a part of the 3M Bookshelf games series.

In 1976, the 3M game division was sold to Avalon Hill and Acquire became part of their bookcase game series. Four years later, Avalon Hill published the computer game Computer Acquire for the PET, Apple II, and TRS-80.

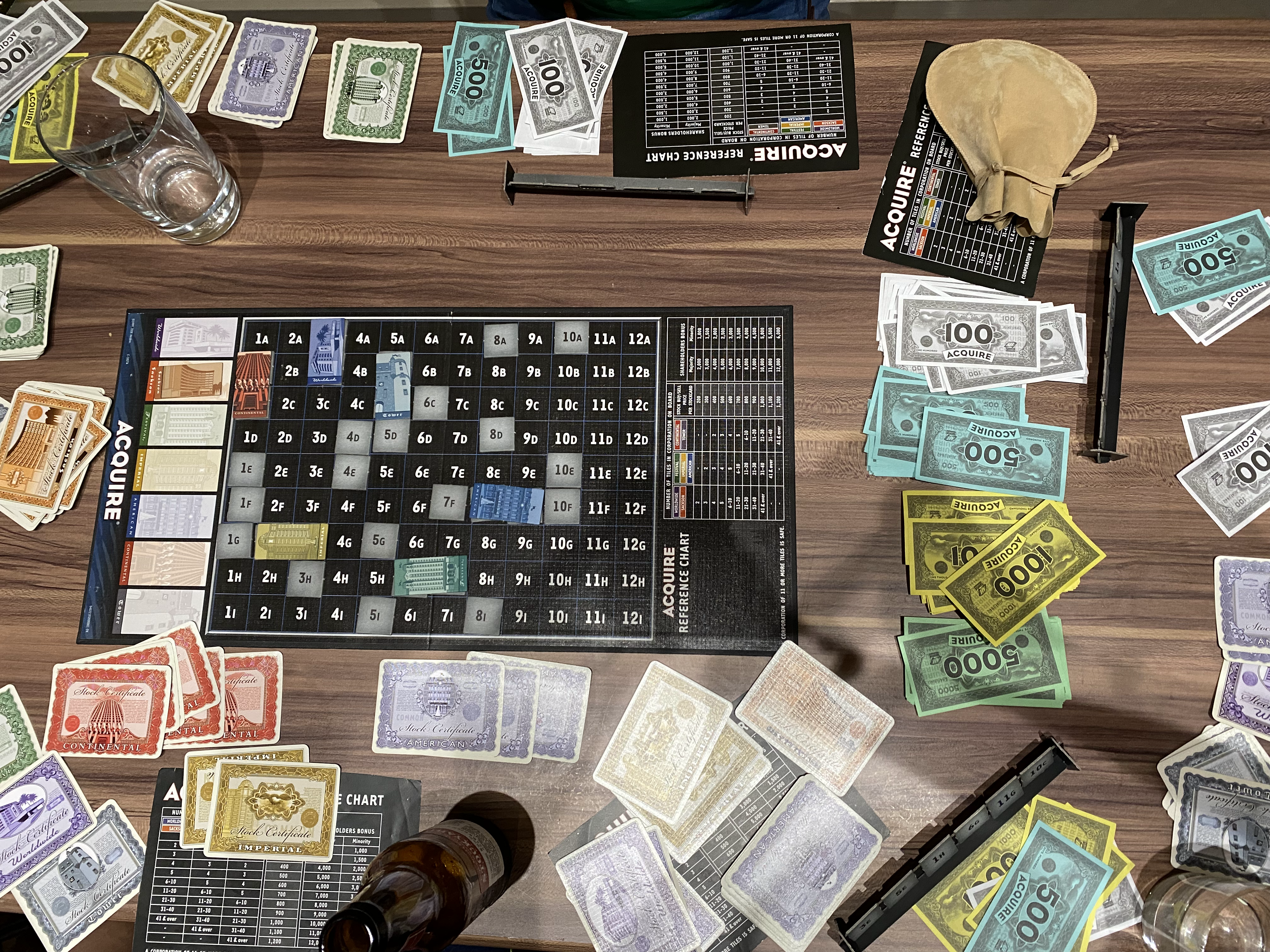
Example of Acquire game play, Wizards of the Coast edition

In 1998, Avalon Hill became part of Hasbro. The new owners reissued a slightly revised version of Acquire in 2000, in which the hotel chains were replaced by fictitious corporations, though the actual gameplay was unchanged. Hasbro soon thereafter discontinued it. In the mid-2000s, the game was transferred to a Hasbro subsidiary, Wizards of the Coast (WotC). In 2008, WotC celebrated "50 years of Avalon Hill Games" with the release of a new edition of Acquire, although the game was not yet 50 years old. In 2016, the game was transferred back to the Hasbro games division and republished in 2016 under the Avalon label, with hotels chains reinstated.

== Reception ==
In The Playboy Winner's Guide to Board Games, game designer Jon Freeman compared Cartel (A Gamut of Games) and Acquire, noting that both were "better games which focus on the joining of companies into conglomerates." Freeman thought Acquire had an edge over Cartel "in the quality of its components [...] Acquire's higher price is unquestionably reflected in its packaging and presentation [and deserves] a place in your game library."

Games Magazine included Acquire in their "Top 100 Games" in four consecutive years:

- In 1980 the editors praised it as a "classic game of getting in on the ground floor" and "proof that you need money to make money", noting that "a delicate sense of timing is important, but greed and a lust for power also help."
- In 1981, the editors noted that it "combines the flavors of Monopoly and the stock market" and cautioned that "Since the object is to acquire cash, careful timing of investments (and raids on competitors' chains!) is critical to winning".
- In 1982, the editors commented that "Among family games, this is one of the most strategic."
- In 1983, the editors commented "Adding to chains increases their value, but you must anticipate mergers, which occur when someone plays the right connecting tile at the right time."

In the December 1993 edition of Dragon (Issue 200), Allen Varney advised readers to ignore the hotel theme: "Supposedly a game of hotel acquisitions and mergers, this is actually a superb abstract game of strategy and capital." Varney called the game "An early masterpiece from [Sid] Sackson, game historian and one of the great designers of our time."

=== Awards ===
The game was short-listed for the first Spiel des Jahres board game awards in 1979.

GAMES magazine inducted Acquire into their buyers' guide Hall of Fame. The magazine's stated criteria for the Hall of Fame encompasses "games that have met or exceeded the highest standards of quality and play value and have been continuously in production for at least 10 years; i.e., classics."

Acquire was inducted into the Academy of Adventure Gaming Arts & Design's Hall of Fame, along with game designer Sid Sackson, in 2011. It is also one of the Mind Sports Olympiad games.

== Reviews ==
- Jeux & Stratégie #1 (as "Trust")
- Jeux & Stratégie #6
- Jeux & Stratégie #51
- Games & Puzzles #11
- Games & Puzzles #69

== See also ==
- Monopoly
