= Auction (disambiguation) =

An auction is a process of offering goods or services up for bids.

Auction may also refer to:

- Auction (board game), a 1989 edition of the board game High-Bid
- Auction (cards), the period of bidding in card games
- Auction (website), an online auction company based in South Korea
