= Wacht am Rhein =

Wacht am Rhein (English: The watch/guard on the Rhine) may refer to:

- "Die Wacht am Rhein", German patriotic song
- Unternehmen: Wacht am Rhein, German codeword for the operation known to the Allies as the Battle of the Bulge.
- Wacht am Rhein (game), a 1977 board wargame that simulates the Battle of the Bulge

== See also ==
- Watch on the Rhine (disambiguation)
