= Ploy =

A ploy is a tactic (method), strategy, or gimmick.

Ploy may also refer to:

- Ploy (board game), a board game
- ploy (film), a 2007 Thai film
- Ploy (musical instrument), a Cambodian musical instrument
- PLOY (musical artist), a metal core band from Philadelphia
