= TwixT =

Connection board game in the 3M bookshelf game series

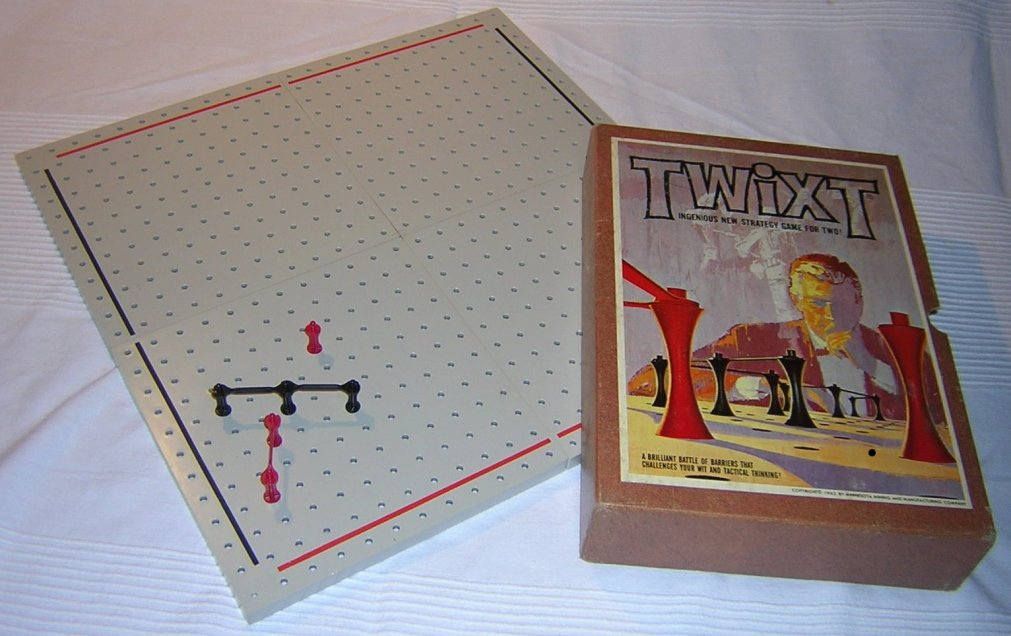
- Board and box of the 3M edition
- Designers: Alex Randolph
- Publishers: 3M
- Publication: 1962
- Genres: Board game; Abstract strategy game; Paper-and-pencil game
- Players: 2
- Chance: none

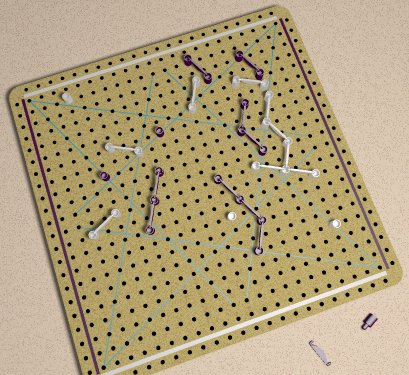
A computer-generated image of a game of TwixT

TwixT is a two-player strategy board game, an early entrant in the 1960s 3M bookshelf game series. It became one of the most popular and enduring games in the series. It is a connection game where players alternate turns placing pegs and links on a pegboard in an attempt to link their opposite sides. While TwixT itself is simple, the game also requires strategy, so young children can play it, but it also appeals to adults. The game has been discontinued except in Germany and Japan.

== History ==
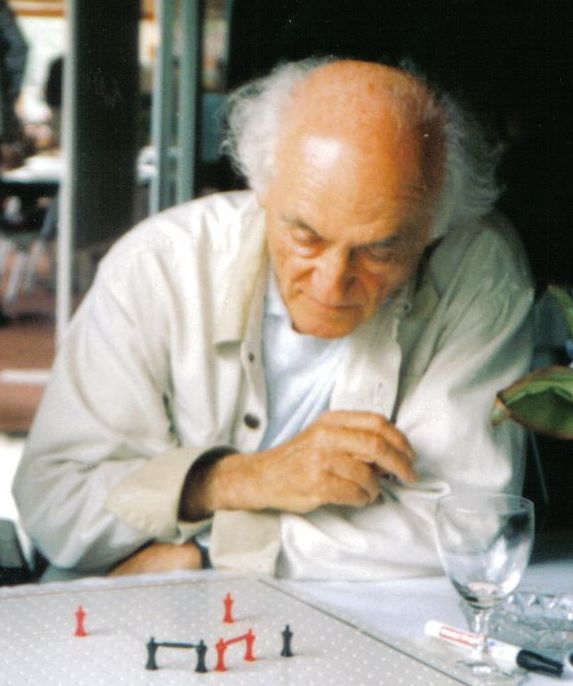
Randolph playing TwixT in 1998

TwixT was invented as a paper and pencil game in 1957 by Alex Randolph, a game designer. When Alex was commissioned along with Sid Sackson by 3M in 1961 to start a games division, the game was issued as a boardgame, one of the first 3M bookshelf games. Avalon Hill took over publication in 1976 when 3M sold its game division. Avalon's parent company was acquired by Hasbro in 1998, and the game was discontinued. The game is no longer produced in the United States, but a succession of German companies has produced the game since the 1970s under license from Avalon. TwixT was short-listed for the first Spiel des Jahres in 1979, and was inducted into the Academy of Adventure Gaming Arts & Design's Hall of Fame, along with Randolph, in 2011.

== Rules ==
Twixt is played on a board comprising a 24×24 square grid of holes (minus 4 corner holes). The game has two types of playing pieces, pegs, which fit into the holes, and links, which fit into the top of the peg pieces and are used to connect to peg pieces. In the 3M edition, players are Red and Black; different sets may use different colors. The topmost and bottommost rows of holes belong to the lighter color; the leftmost and rightmost rows to the darker color.

- The players take turns placing pegs of their respective colors on the board, one peg per turn.
- The player with the lighter color makes the first move.
- A player may not place a peg on their opponent's border rows.
- To counteract first-move advantage, the pie rule is suggested. After the first peg is placed, the second player has the option to swap sides. This is typically indicated by turning the pieces box end for end, or swapping boxes if they are separate. If the second player chooses not to swap immediately after the first peg is placed, then sides may not be swapped later in that game. (This "one-move equalization" was added by Randolph after 3M published his game. It is present in the Schmidt Spiele edition and all later editions.)
- After placing a peg, a player may link one or more pairs of pegs on the board of their colour. The links can only connect two pegs a knight's move away from each other, and cannot cross another link; they block other links, most importantly those of the opponent. As part of the player's move, they may remove their own links (but not those of the opponent) in order to rearrange the sequence of links on the board. A variant for pencil and paper play allows a connection to cross the player's links but not those of the opponent.
- The object is to make a continuous chain of linked pegs connecting the player's border rows. If neither player can achieve this, the game is a draw.

== Computational complexity for general rectangular boards ==
TwixT has been proven to be PSPACE-complete for determining the game value, via a reduction from Hex. TwixT has also been shown to be NP-complete regarding whether a single set of vertices can support a connecting path, via a reduction from 3-satisfiability. These proofs are indicative of a complex strategy: the game has not been solved, no winning strategy has been discovered, nor is the outcome of the game with perfect play known.

== Related games ==
On the 24×24 grid, tactical considerations tend to predominate. The opening phase is over quickly, and the rest of the game is spent attempting to tactically execute the plan. Hex, which has a very similar game object, may have more predictable tactics, but strategical considerations are much more important. In this sense, Hex is more like Go than TwixT, since a single move is generally less committal, and consequences may take longer to play out.

== Variants ==
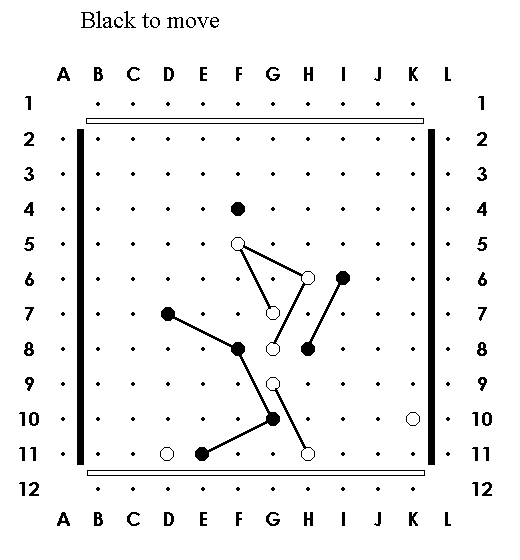
A contrived position where black to move wins under PP rules, but loses under standard rules.

One variant is Twixt PP (Paper and Pencil). The rules are almost identical to standard TwixT, except links are never removed and a player's own links are allowed to cross each other. A winning path might loop across itself but crossed links are not connected to each other at the intersection. The paper and pencil rules may reduce the number of draws (which are already rare). Whether it reduces the complexity of the game or not is highly debatable.

This rules difference has no effect in terms of game outcome most of the time. For those rare situations where it does, most of those cases are where a draw under standard rules is a decisive game under PP rules. The image shows a contrived position where black is to move. Black wins under PP rules but loses under standard rules.

Row handicapping can be used to equalize the game for players of different strengths. The simplest handicap is to allow the weaker player to move first (i.e. eliminate the pie rule). Beyond that, one dimension of the grid is reduced so the weaker player has a shorter distance to span.

A diagonal TwixT board.

The game may be played on different size grids. The 12×12 board shown here leads to a very short game. On the standard board, tactics dominate; larger boards introduce deeper strategic considerations. Since most commercial sets use boards which are made from four "quadrants" which either clip together or are hinged, a 36×36 grid could be assembled from three standard sets of the same size. In Europe, there briefly appeared a TwixT knock-off called "Imuri" which used a 30×30 grid. The board had no holes, and lines were drawn to indicate where the links could be placed. This edition was removed from shelves for copyright infringement.

Mark Thompson's variant Diagonal TwixT has the same rules as standard TwixT, but the border lines run at a 45-degree angle to the grid. David Bush's version has the border lines running parallel to link paths. These variants result in different tactical patterns.

== Competition ==
The official world championships were held as part of the Mind Sports Olympiad in 1997, 1998 and 1999. Since 2000 TwixT has had a major international tournament as part of the MSO but there has been no official World Championships. Between 2011 and 2022, the TwixT event at the MSO has again become the World Championships. The list of winners is given below.

List of MSO champions

- 1997: (United States) Alex Randolph
- 1998: (Germany) Klaus Hussmanns
- 1999: (Germany) Klaus Hussmanns
- 2000: (Germany) Klaus Hussmanns
- 2001: (Germany) Klaus Hussmanns
- 2002: (Germany) Peter Henke
- 2003: (Germany) Klaus Hussmanns
- 2004: (Sweden) Carl J. Ragnarsson
- 2005: (United States) David Bush
- 2006: (United States) David Bush
- 2007: (England) Bharat Thakrar
- 2008: (England) Bharat Thakrar
- 2009: (United States) David Bush
- 2010: (England) Bharat Thakrar
- 2011: (England) David M. Pearce
- 2012: (France) Florian Jamain
- 2013: (Norway) Jan Kristian Haugland
- 2014: (France) Florian Jamain
- 2015: (France) Florian Jamain
- 2016: (France) Florian Jamain
- 2017: (France) Florian Jamain
- 2018: (France) Florian Jamain
- 2019: (Italy) Cosimo Cardellicchio
- 2020: (United States) David Bush
- 2021: (France) Florian Jamain
- 2022: (France) Florian Jamain
- 2024: (France) Florian Jamain

== Reception ==
Games magazine included TwixT in their "Top 100 Games of 1980", describing it as "much more subtle and interesting than the old Bridg-It, with which it should not be confused".

Games magazine included TwixT in their "Top 100 Games of 1981", noting that "The best offense, oddly enough, is a good defense."

Games magazine included TwixT in their "Top 100 Games of 1982", noting that "Subtlety and finesse will win every time against straightforward aggression in this game of great depth and varied tactics."

== Reviews ==
- Jeux & Stratégie #6
- Games & Puzzles #18
- The Playboy Winner's Guide to Board Games
- Family Games: The 100 Best
- The Guide to simulations/games for education and training

== See also ==
- List of connection games
- Gale, also called Bridg-It
