= Ploy (board game) =

1970 3M bookshelf game

- Ploy, part of the 3M bookshelf game series
- Designers: Frank Thibault
- Publishers: 3M
- Genres: abstract strategy
- Players: 2 or 4
- Chance: None
- Skills: Tactics, Strategy, Observation

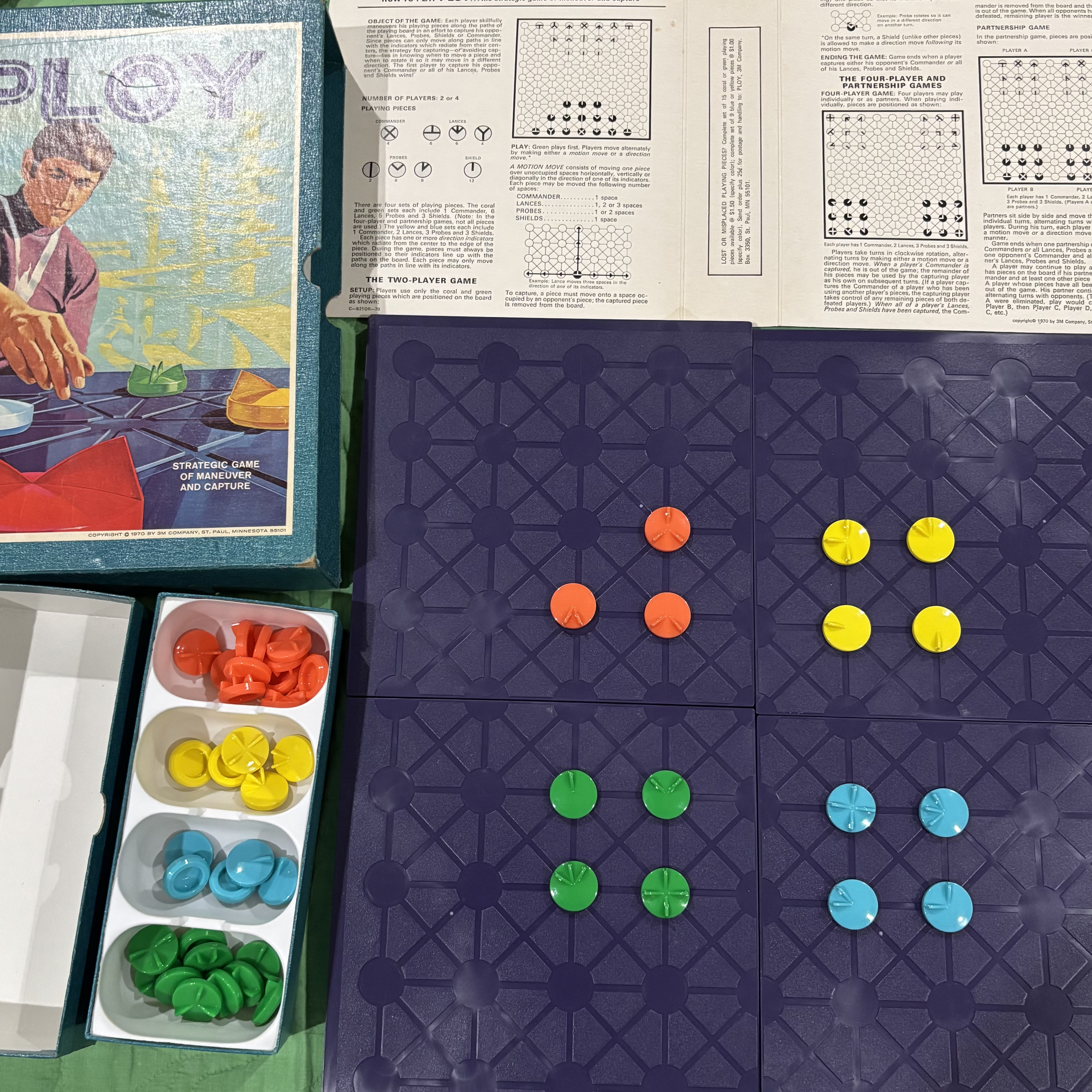
Box, instructions, board, and tray, with pieces showing direction indicators.

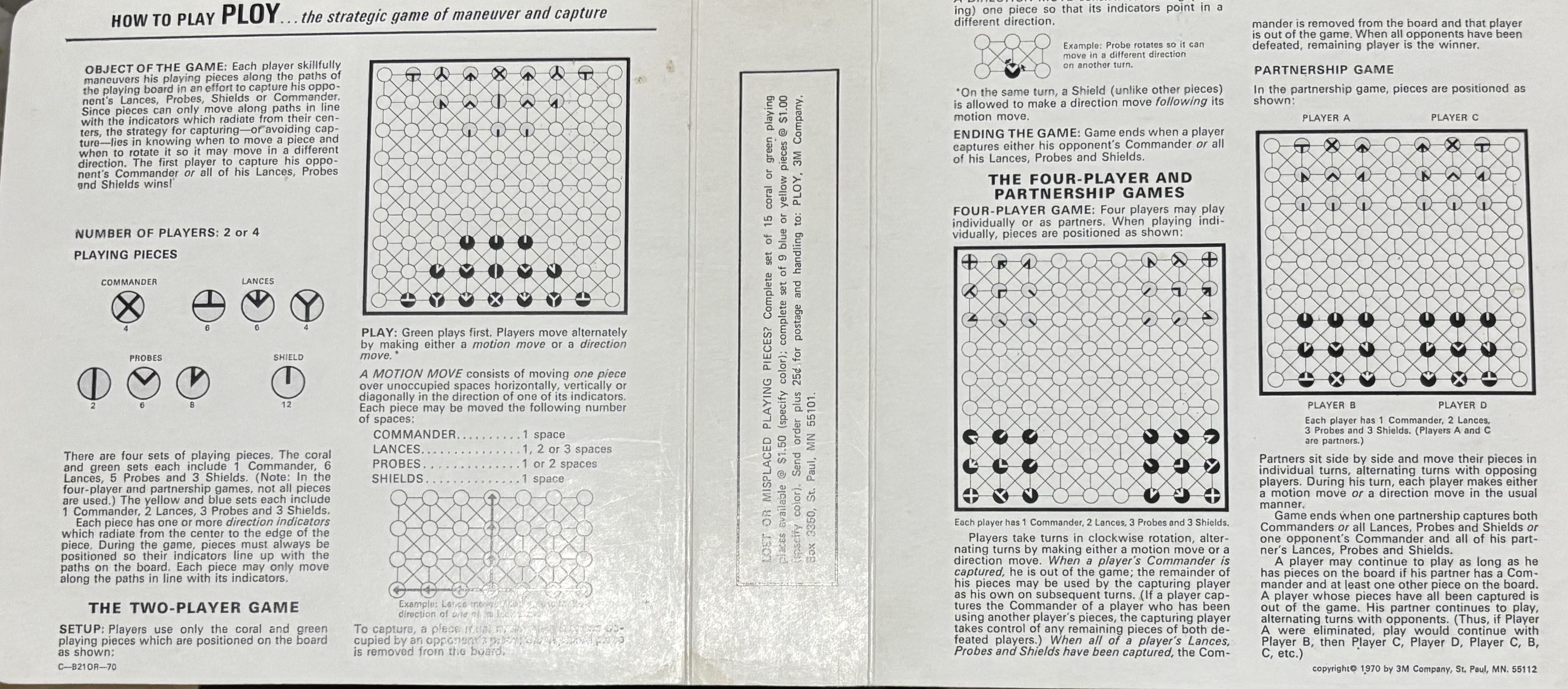
Instructions included in game.

Ploy is an abstract strategy board game for two or four players.

It was invented by Frank Thibault and commercially released by 3M Company in 1970, as part of the 3M bookshelf game series. The game set includes a board and 48 pieces of various colors and markings along with instructions and a plastic tray to sort the pieces. The game is marketed as a "space-age strategy game". 3M no longer produces the game, but Ploy has been adapted for play on Vassal, Zillions of Games or via a ploy program.

== Game mechanics ==
The following game mechanics are identical for all variations of play.

Object of the game is to capture the opponent's Commander, or all of his other pieces.

It is played with a set of 15 pieces (2-handed) or 9 pieces (4-handed and partnership games) per player. The different classes of pieces have horizontal, vertical and/or diagonal "movement direction indicators" embossed on them, and movements are limited by class. A piece that has one line (Shield) may move one space on the grid, in the indicated direction; a piece with two lines (Probe) may move up to two spaces, in one of the two directions; a piece with three lines (Lance) may move up to three spaces in one of the three directions; the Commander may move one space in one of four directions. The Shield may move, rotate or move and rotate in a single turn; the other classes may either move or rotate in a single turn.

The game board is square with nine vertices on a side. Vertical, horizontal, and diagonal lines connect the vertices. Players place pieces on their side ( 2 player) or corner( 4 player) with Shields in front, then Probes, then Lances, with a Commander in the center.

The game has two player, 4 player, and 4 player partnership variations.

Green plays first, then play alternates according to variation.

Players may move their pieces along straight lines, from vertex to vertex.

If a vertex is occupied by a piece of another color, the player may capture it.

This game uses displacement capture. When a capture is made, the captured piece is removed from the board and the vacated square is occupied by the captor, halting the captor's movement.

== Ways to play ==
Ploy can be played online via the Vassal Engine. Also you can play against three different computer AI's, Jean-Louis Cazaux's for Zillions of Games, Mats Winther's for Zillions, or Thomas Tensi's Ploy program.

== Reviews ==
- Games and Puzzles
- Games & Puzzles #22
- The Playboy Winner's Guide to Board Games

== See also ==
- Feudal, another somewhat chess-like game in the 3M bookshelf series
- Xiangqi, "Chinese chess", a game that's similar in outward appearance
