= Fortune (game) =

Board game

Fortune is a board game published by Philmar in 1976.

== Gameplay ==
Fortune is an economic business game.

== Reviews ==
- Games & Puzzles
- Jeux & Stratégie #55 (as "Business")
