= Organized Crime (game) =

1974 board game

Organized Crime is a board game published by Koplow Games in 1974.

== Gameplay ==
Organized Crime is an economic political strategy game about the mafia.

== Reviews ==
- Games & Puzzles #44
- Jeux & Stratégie #17
