= Breakthru (board game) =

Abstract strategy board game

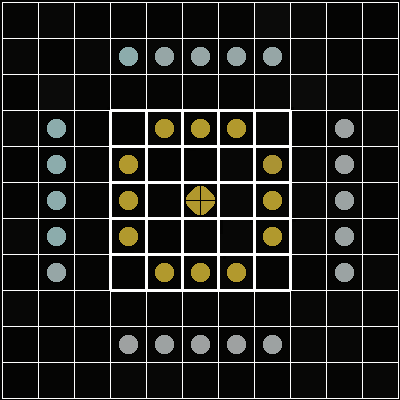
- One of several possible start positions
- Genres: Board game Abstract strategy game
- Players: 2
- Chance: none
- Skills: Strategy, tactics, observation
- Modern naval blockade-themed game based on historic Tafl games. Out of production.

Breakthru is an abstract strategy board game for two players, designed by Alex Randolph and commercially released by 3M in 1965, as part of the 3M bookshelf game series. It later became part of the Avalon Hill bookcase games. It is no longer in production. The game has been compared to Fox and Hounds, although it shows more characteristics of the tafl games of the Middle Ages, such as hnefatafl.

As in hnefatafl, the game features unevenly matched teams with different objectives. The 3M game set includes a board marked with an 11 × 11 cell square grid, twenty silver-colored pieces, a gold-colored "flagship" and twelve gold-colored "escorts". The game is played out as a naval battle, with strategy analogous to the siege game of hnefatafl.

== Rules ==
The rules of play are as follows:

=== Objective ===
One player has a "gold" fleet consisting of one large flagship and twelve escorts, with the objective of evading capture while breaking through his or her opponent's blockade, to move the flagship to the perimeter of the board. The other player has a "silver" fleet of twenty ships, and forms a blockade to trap the gold flagship and destroy the gold fleet's escorts, with the objective of capturing the flagship.

=== Setup ===
The "gold player" is determined arbitrarily or by coin toss, and the other player becomes the "silver player".

Gold player places the flagship on the center square of the game board, and positions the rest of the ships anywhere within the boldly ruled central area of the board.

Silver player then positions the silver ships on twenty squares in the lightly ruled peripheral area of the board.

=== Play ===
Gold player chooses who goes first. Players move alternately by making two moves or one capture anywhere on the board. When the flagship is moved, only one move or capture is made (thus only the flagship).

==== Moves ====
A player may move two of the smaller playing pieces any number of vacant squares either horizontally or vertically on the board (as a rook in Chess, except that no captures can be made with this move), although if the flagship is moved, the gold player may not move another playing piece.

==== Captures ====
A player may move any playing piece (including the flagship) one square diagonally to capture one of his opponent's playing pieces. (This move is similar to the capture-move of the pawn in chess, except that captures can be made on any of the four diagonals.)

This game uses displacement capture (like chess), rather than hnefatafl-style custodial capture, thus when a capture is made, the captured piece is removed from the board and the vacated square is occupied by the captor.

Play continues until one player achieves his or her objective. If the flagship of the gold fleet reaches one of the outermost squares on the board, gold player wins. If the flagship is captured before it reaches the outer edge of the board, silver player wins.

== Reception ==
In a 1974 review, Games and Puzzles described the game as "interesting", but criticized 3M's presentation of it as "poor", with a "very small board and crude looking pieces". They suggested that the reader might instead make their own set from paper.
