= Image (board game) =

1971 card game by Henry Szwarce

- Designers: Henry Szwarce
- Illustrators: R. Kranz
- Publishers: 3M; Avalon Hill
- Publication: 1971; 55 years ago
- Genres: Card game; Party game
- Players: 2-6
- Playing time: 30 minutes
- Age range: 9+

Image is a card game developed Henry Szwarce and published by 3M in 1971. The object of the game is to put together cards that represent a historical or fictional character.

== Gameplay ==
Five cards are dealt to each player from a special deck containing "Place" (representing birth place), "Activity" (representing field associated with), "Time" (representing time period), "Status" (representing current existence of the character), and "Letter" (representing the first letter of the character's last name) cards. Ten additional cards are laid face up as "board cards" that can be swapped with cards from players' hands during play.

Players build up four "images" of characters by playing cards from their hand on the board. Players can change images by playing a card of the same category over one already on the image. Challenges can be made about whether a player actually has a character in mind for a laid combination of cards, which can result in a penalty. Images are completed by playing a Letter card with an announcement of the person formed. This closes the image and the player who played the letter card is awarded points proportional to the number of cards in the completed image.

The player with the most points at the end of the game is the winner.

== Reception ==
Albie Fiore, reviewing for Games and Puzzles magazine, called Image "a highly enjoyable, but not too skillful, variation on Botticelli."

== Reviews ==
- Games & Puzzles #54
