= Wacht am Rhein (game) =

Grand tactical monster board wargame

- Cover art by Redmond Simonsen, 1977
- Designers: Jim Dunnigan
- Illustrators: Redmond Simonsen
- Publishers: Simulations Publications, Inc.
- Publication: 1977
- Genres: World War II

Wacht am Rhein is a grand tactical monster board wargame published by Simulations Publications, Inc. (SPI) in 1977 that simulates Germany's Battle of the Bulge offensive in late 1944 during World War II.

== Description ==
In December 1944, in an operation codenamed "Wacht am Rhein" ("Watch on the Rhine"), the German army tried to repeat its triumph of 1940 by breaking through the lightly guarded Ardennes Forest sector in an attempt to drive a wedge through the Allied armies, take the port of Antwerp and force a separate negotiated peace with the British, French and American allies. Wacht am Rhein is a simulation of that conflict, a grand tactical two-player wargame set at the battalion and company level. With 1400 counters, it is considered a "monster" wargame.

=== Components ===
The game was packaged in either a clear plastic flat box that incorporated counter trays, or a standard cardboard bookshelf game box. Both boxes included:

- Four 22 by 34 inches (560 mm × 860 mm) hex grid paper maps scaled to 1 mile (1.6 km) per hex
- 1600 double-sided 1/2 inch (13 mm) die-cut counters
- Rulebook
- Two Game Charts and Tables sheets
- Axis Turn Record/Reinforcement Track and an Allied Turn Record/Reinforcement Track
- Six-sided die

=== Scenarios ===
Two smaller scenarios use limited counters and only one of the four maps, and are designed to allow the players to learn the rules.

- "Bastogne"
- "Kampfgrüppe Peiper"

Two larger scenarios use all four maps joined together into a 44" x 68" master map representing the entire front of the U.S. V and VII Corps, and use all 1400 counters.

- "December 21 – The Race for the Meuse": Play begins at the historic point where the German forces reached their furthest penetration.
- "Campaign": Covers the entire battle from December 16, 1944 to January 2, 1945.

=== Gameplay ===
Each day is divided into a morning turn representing 4 1/2 hours, an afternoon turn representing 4 1/2 hours, and an evening turn representing 15 hours.

At the start of each morning turn the Allied player randomly determines the weather conditions for the day, and both players allocate their air missions for the day. Both players also check to see if any of their isolated units have surrendered.

During each turn, the Allied player acts first:

- Mutual Supply Determination Phase
- Movement Phase
- Bridge Blowing and Bridge Building Phase
- Combat Phase

Once the Allied player is finished, the German player gets the same phases.

For movement purposes units are divided into two classes according to their degree of mechanisation. There are two modes of movement, tactical and march, the latter allowing bridge crossing and a bonus for road movement but disadvantages for combat and stacking. Terrain effects are included in the Combat Results Table, and units may take step losses or retreat. Isolation may lead to surrender of entire divisions, decided by a die roll. Units may be supplied by air and Allied air power gradually reduces German supply.

Once both players have completed their turn, there is a Mutual Fatigue Reduction phase.

At the end of each night game turn, but before the start of the next day, each player — the Allied player first and then the German player — may choose to take a Night Bonus Game Turn. Any units that move during this Bonus Turn have a chance to be "fatigued" the next day, halving their movement and attack factors until they recover; and any units that are involved in night combat are always fatigued the next day until they recover.

There are also several optional rules that can be used with the agreement of both players, including new artillery rules, engineer rules for the German forces, and morale rules.

== Publication history ==
SPI had previously published two small board wargames about the Battle of the Bulge: The Ardennes Offensive (1973), and Bastogne: The Desperate Defense (1976). Wacht am Rhein, considerably larger and more complex than either of its predecessors, was designed by Jim Dunnigan and developed by Jospeph Balkoski and Jay Nelson. It was published by SPI in 1977 with cartography and artwork by Redmond Simonsen. Several errors and ambiguities in the rules and set up were discovered after the game's release, and SPI published a set of errata in Fire & Movement #8.

Wacht am Rhein was not a bestseller for SPI. Although the game was #2 in SPI sales in April 1977, it fell to 10th place only two months later, and permanently disappeared off SPI's Top 10 list by the end of the summer.

The game system was used by Joseph Balkoski, with some modification, for Atlantic Wall (1978).

When TSR took over SPI in 1983 and sought to get an immediate return on its money by re-printing a number of SPI titles, Wacht am Rhein was not included.

A revised version of the game was published by Decision Games in 2005.

== Reception ==
In Issue 40 of Moves, Jim Govostes liked some of the innovative rules such as the Night Bonus Game Turn, and overall found the scenarios to be balanced, and the effects of the terrain and limited roads equally as frustrating for both players. Govostes thought that leader counters should have been included, as they were in SPI's Highway to the Reich (1977), pointing out that "There were several prominent men who affected the outcome of the battle." Despite some quibbles about various rules, Govostes concluded with a strong recommendation, saying, "I heartily and highly recommend Wacht am Rhein. While there are flaws, they are small. The guts of the game system is a thing to behold. The game can take one from the very heights of euphoria to the depths of utter frustration easily. It is one of my choices for SPI's best."

In his 1977 book The Comprehensive Guide to Board Wargaming, Nick Palmer called this "a real feast for the expert, ghastly for beginners."

In the 1980 book, The Best of Board Wargaming , Marcus Watney gave an extended review of the game. He described it as “surprisingly playable ... the rules are all sensible and therefore easy to remember” despite the two pages of errata. However, he found several issues that detracted from it: "The Truppeneinheit (German commando) units are far too powerful, being able to divert entire divisions turn after turn; too many small artillery units bog down play and detract from an otherwise swiftly moving game; and the US activation rules are open to the most appalling abuses." (On the first day US units are only activated when attacked, so the German player can ignore the Monschau area and concentrate his attack between Elsenborn and St Vith, achieving a deep breakthrough and taking the Monschau units from behind. Watney recommended allowing non-attacked units to be activated in a ripple effect dependent on their distance from the nearest combat, and that inactive units not be deemed to cause traffic jams.) Watney concluded by giving the game an "Excitement" grade of 70% and 90% for "Realism", saying, "Nevertheless, this is basically a sound game, and very entertaining when there are a large number of players" (he recommended one player per corps). The book's editor Nick Palmer listed the game as one of his personal favourites.

In The Guide to Simulations/Games for Education and Training, Martin Campion called this "an excellent game for history and playability and gives the feel of real tactics though its rules. It is a very complex and long game but it is worth the time spent playing it." Campion did not think this would be a usable teaching aid, saying, "Because of its size and length it is not well suited to school use."

In the 1980 book The Complete Book of Wargames, game designer Jon Freeman called this "perhaps the ultimate simulation of the Battle of the Bulge, long a favorite gaming topic. The wealth of detail reduces the playability of the game, but you don't purchase a game of this physical immensity for playability anyway, and the illusion of reality created is intense." Freeman concluded by giving the game an Overall Evaluation of "Very Good", although he noted the game was "for hard-core enthusiasts only [...] For true Bulge enthusiasts it will provide endless hours of engrossing and educational conflict."

The website SPI Wargame Resources believes that Wacht am Rhein "has stood the test of time to become one of the top 5 monster games in history."

== Awards ==
- At the 1978 Origins Awards, Wacht am Rhein was a finalist for a Charles S. Roberts Award in the category "Best Tactical Game of 1977".

== Other reviews ==
- Moves #46
- Strategy & Tactics #71
- Strategy & Tactics #78
- Fire & Movement #18, #20, and #65
- The Wargamer Vol.1 #33, and Vol.2 #17
- Campaign #92 and #95
- The Grenadier #27
- Zone of Control #4
- Paper Wars #21
- Simulacrum #20 and #21
- Simulations Canada Newsletter #13
- Wargame News #42
- Games & Puzzles #73
