= Oh-Wah-Ree =

Board game

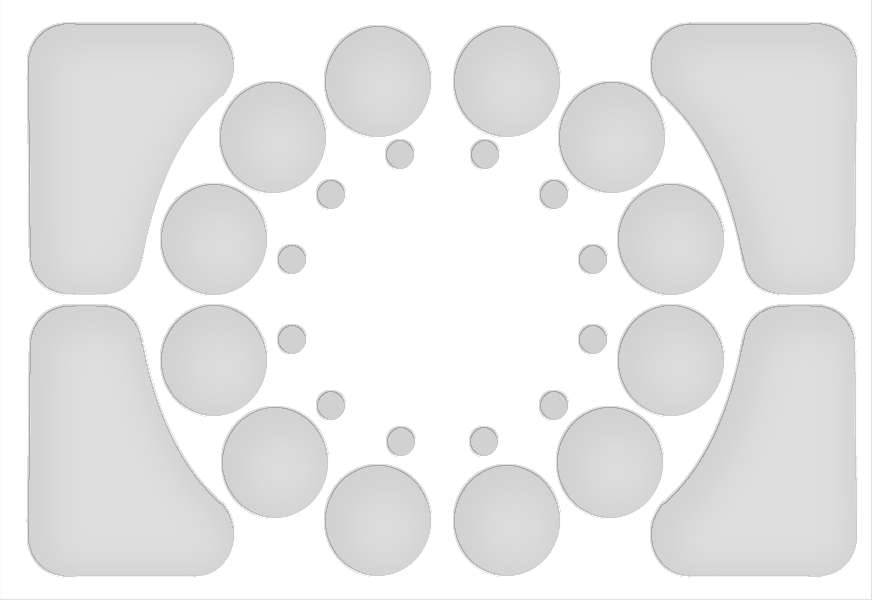
- Board layout
- Designers: Alex Randolph
- Publishers: 3M; Avalon Hill
- Publication: 1962; 64 years ago
- Genres: Abstract strategy; Mancala
- Players: 2-4
- Playing time: 30 minutes
- Age range: 8+

Oh-Wah-Ree is a mancala variant designed by Alex Randolph and published in 1962 by 3M as part of their bookshelf game line. The name "Oh-Wah-Ree" is taken from Oware, a typical West African game for which it is based on. It is played on a board with a ring of pits and stone playing pieces, distinguished from other mancala variants by the use of a second ring of holes to mark ownership of pits by the players, allowing play between more than two players at a time. The object is to capture the opponents' stones.

== Gameplay ==
There are many different Oh-Wah-Ree variations which have their own rules and win conditions. In each version, pebbles are divided equally between the 12 pits. On their turn, a player chooses any one of the pits marked by a marker of their colour and scoops all the pebbles out of it, dropping them one at a time clockwise into adjacent pits.

In standard Oh-Wah-Ree, a player may capture pebbles when their last pebble is dropped in an opponent's pit which contains two or three pebbles. The game ends when one player cannot play because their pits are empty, or in a game with more than two players when two players in succession cannot play. The player with the most pebbles wins the game.

=== Grand Oh-Wah-Ree ===
Grand Oh-Wah-Ree is a rules variant of Oh-Wah-Ree in which the players capture pits as well as the stones in them. The capturing player places a marker of their own colour into the second ring of holes, replacing an opponent's marker, and the pit is theirs until it is recaptured. The game continues as normal, with the winner being the player with the greatest number of pits at the end.

== Reception ==
Games magazine included Oh-Wah-Ree in their "Top 100 Games of 1981", noting that while there may be many commercial versions of mancala, "only this one includes rules for several of the best variations, as well as illustrative examples of entire games". The game was also included in their "Top 100 Games of 1982", where it was similarly said that of the wooden boards marketed by other companies "none of those editions provide so outstanding a rulebook, giving rules for 10 of the best two-rank mancala ("pit-and-pebble") games".

== Reviews ==
- The Playboy Winner's Guide to Board Games
- The Guide to simulations/games for education and training

== See also ==
- Contigo, another mancala variant in the 3M bookshelf series
