= Atlantic Wall (wargame) =

Board wargame

Cover of "soap box" edition, 1978

Atlantic Wall, subtitled "The Invasion of Europe June 1944", is a board wargame published by Simulations Publications Inc. (SPI) in 1978 that simulates Operation Overlord during World War II, when Allied forces landed on Normandy beaches and attempted to break out into open country.

== Background ==
After the United States entered World War II in 1941, Germany knew the Allies would eventually attempt a major amphibious assault somewhere along the European coast, and created a series of strong beach defenses from Norway to the French-Spanish border dubbed the Atlantic Wall. In June 1944, the Allied forces attempted to breach this wall at the Normandy beaches.

== Description ==
Atlantic Wall is a two-player (or two-team) monster wargame (having more than 1000 counters) with an enormous five-piece map. One player or team controls the Allied forces trying to land and break out into open country, and the other player or team controls the German forces trying to contain and destroy the Allies. It is a highly complex game — one reviewer estimated that the entire Campaign Game would take 100 hours to complete.

=== Components ===
The game includes:

- five 22" x 34" paper hex grid maps scaled at 1 km (5/8 mi) per hex
- 2000 double-sided die-cut counters
- 32-page rulebook
- scenario book
- various charts and player aids
- two small six-sided dice

=== Gameplay ===
Atlantic Wall uses a rules system based on SPI's Wacht am Rhein published the previous year. A turn consists of the following phases:

- Weather Determination Phase (for a morning turn only)
- Allied Mulberry Stage (for a morning turn only)
- Mutual Air Allocation Stage (for morning and night game-turns only)
- Mutual Artillery Resupply Stage
- Allied Player-Turn (post-invasion stage only)
- Allied Parachute Drop (game-turn one only)
- Allied Invasion Stage (Invasion scenarios only)
  - Air bombardment phase
  - First Allied sea-landing phase
  - Second sea-landing phase
  - Third sea-landing phase
- German Player-Turn
- Naval Movement Stage (afternoon game-turns only)
- Game Turn Indication Stage

This completes one game turn, which represents 4.5 hours in game time.

The game features ranged artillery (i.e. firing more than one hex) and column shifts (i.e. changes to the odds) for combined arms combat and armor superiority. Units defeated in combat may suffer dIsruption and demoralisation as well as the losses and retreats from the Wacht Am Rhien system.

In addition, the players or teams can choose to incorporate a number of optional rules: Mechanized Infantry Movement, Saturation Bombardments, Alternate Final Protective Fire, Alternate June 6 Weather, German E-Boats, and Varying Corps Attachments.

=== Scenarios ===
The game comes with six shorter scenarios that use a single map, and one long scenario that uses all five maps. The shorter scenarios are:

- Post-Invasion:
  - "The Fall of Cherbourg" (36 turns)
  - "The Caumont Gap" (16 turns)
  - "Operation Epsom" (20 turns).
- Invasion:
  - "Bloody Omaha" (4 turns)
  - "Gold, Juno, Sword" (4 turns)
  - "Utah Beach" (4 game turns)

The long scenario, the Campaign Game, combines all six scenarios and in 104 turns covers the entire operation from the parachute drops and amphibious assaults of 6 June until the attempted Allied breakout into open countryside 26 days later.

=== Victory conditions ===
The victory conditions for the Campaign Game are dependent on the choices made by the Allied player or team, who must secretly choose a strategic plan before the start of the game.

== Publication history ==
In 1977, SPI published the monster game Wacht am Rhein about the Battle of the Bulge, and followed this up in 1978 with the equally complex Atlantic Wall using the same rules system. The game was designed by Joseph Balkoski, with graphic design by Redmond A. Simonsen, and was packaged in a double "flatpack" box. This was quickly changed to a large "soap box" . The game proved popular: it rose to #5 on SPI's Top Ten Bestseller list as soon as it was published, and remained on the list for the next eight months.

After the demise of SPI, Hobby Japan acquired the game rights and published a Japanese-language edition, 大西洋の壁 (Atlantic Wall), in 1987.

In 2014, Decision Games released an updated and expanded edition titled Atlantic Wall: D-Day to Falaise.

== Reception ==
In the 1980 book The Best of Board Wargaming, Geoff Barnard liked the counters and rules but was ambivalent about the maps, saying they "have been heavily edited, and only the most important terrain features and very few towns have been shown, so they seem rather bare." He also pointed out that the three invasion scenarios "are essentially solitaire, as the German has little to do while the Allied player completes the detailed landing procedures including parachute drops, sea bombardments, commandos, DD tanks, engineering activities and infantry assaults." He concluded by giving the game an average "Excitement" grade of 60%.

In Issue 31 of the UK wargaming magazine Phoenix, Ken Walten liked the game system, saying, "the sequence of play is readily learnt, flows easily, and is thus highly playable, whilst still remaining a highly realistic simulation." Given the complexity of the game and the different tactics required for each scenario, Walten recommended that players try each of the invasion scenarios first before attempting to play the Campaign game.

In The Guide to Simulations/Games for Education and Training, Richard Rydzel called this "a very accurate simulation of the Normandy campaign." He found "The short invasion scenarios are exciting but are usually just a matter of die rolling for a few hours." He questioned the pro-Allied tilt of the game, saying, "The campaign is a long and tedious but fun exercise on how many different ways the German player can be beaten."

== Other reviews and commentary ==
- Fire & Movement #14 and #65
