= Decision Games =

- Type: Private
- Industry: Game publishing, magazines
- Founded: 1988
- Founder: Christopher Cummins
- Headquarters: United States
- Products: Wargames, magazines
- Website: decisiongames.com

Decision Games is a wargaming company founded by Christopher Cummins that publishes Strategy & Tactics magazine. The company has bought the rights to many Simulations Publications games and is reprinting many of them, as well as creating new, original games that vary in complexity.

The company publishes several magazines, which include:

- Strategy & Tactics, which includes a game covering various military events in every issue;
- World at War, which covers World War II and also includes a game in every issue;
- Modern War, which covers the period since World War II and hypothetical future wars and also includes a game in every issue;

== History ==
The company was founded in 1988. In 1989, it started Desert Fox Games, which specialized in selling new and used wargames from various companies.

== Games published ==
Board wargames (license acquired after original publisher went out of business)

- Across Suez
- Advanced European Theater of Operations
- Battle for Germany
- War in Europe
- Wacht Am Rhein
- Atlantic Wall
- Hurtgen Forest

Board wargames (original productions)

- The Seven Years War (1993)
- The '45: The Jacobite Rebellion of 1745 (1995)

Computer conversions from board wargames

- D-Day at Omaha Beach
- D-Day at Tarawa
- War in Europe
- RAF: Lion

Original computer games

- Nuts! The Battle of the Bulge
- Battles of the Ancient World
- Congo Merc
