= The Seven Years War (game) =

The Seven Years War is a 1993 board game published by Decision Games.

== Gameplay ==
The Seven Years War is a game in which an eighteenth‑century grand‑strategy wargame has players maneuver armies, manage supply and recruitment, conduct sieges, and balance diplomatic pressures across quarterly turns to outmaneuver rivals and capture key fortresses.

== Reception ==
Perfidious Albion felt that "This game is very good. Like all Miranda designs, it contains many innovations, some of which do not work [...] The core of the design is nonetheless excellent, and I cannot praise it more highly than by saying that owners of FtG should buy it."
