= Watch on the Rhine (disambiguation) =

Watch on the Rhine (German: Wacht am Rhein) may refer to:

- "Die Wacht am Rhein", a German poem from 1841 and a song from 1854
- Watch on the Rhine (1926 film), German film
- Watch on the Rhine (play) (1941), a play by Lillian Hellman
- Watch on the Rhine (1943), a film based on Lillian Hellman's play
- "Watch on the Rhine" (German: Unternehmen: Wacht am Rhein), the German ground offensive in late 1944 on the Western Front that set off the Battle of the Bulge
- Wacht am Rhein (game), a 1977 board wargame that simulates the Battle of the Bulge
- Watch on the Rhine (novel) (2007), a science fiction novel by Tom Kratman and John Ringo
- Wacht am Rhein, an alternative name for the Niederwalddenkmal monument in Rüdesheim am Rhein
- The Watch on the Rhine, a play by Sidney R. Ellis
