= Computer Acquire =

1980 video game

- Developer: Microcomputer Games
- Publisher: Avalon Hill
- Platforms: Apple II, Atari 8-bit, PET, TRS-80
- Release: 1980

Computer Acquire is a 1980 video game published by Avalon Hill for the Apple II, Atari 8-bit computers, Commodore PET, and TRS-80.

== Gameplay ==
Computer Acquire is an adaptation of the board game Acquire that allows the player to play against the computer choosing from five levels of difficulty.

== Reception ==
Jon Mishcon reviewed Computer Acquire in The Space Gamer No. 45. Mishcon commented that "If you enjoy multiparameter games and you're willing to spend twice that time just to learn what does what, then Acquire may be for you. Otherwise wait for the second edition of the rules."
