= The '45: The Jacobite Rebellion of 1745 =

1995 board wargame

The '45
- Cover art: 1852 lithograph by Adolphe Mouilleron after painting by Sir William Allan
- Designers: Geoffrey Geddes
- Illustrators: Beth Queman; Joe Youst
- Publishers: Decision Games
- Publication: 1995
- Genres: Musket & pike

The '45: The Jacobite Rebellion of 1745 is a board wargame published by Decision Games in 1995 that simulates the Jacobite rising of 1745 — colloquially known as "The '45" — under Bonnie Prince Charlie.

== Background ==
The Catholic House of Stuart, which had ruled England following the death of Elizabeth I, had been overthrown in 1688 during the Glorious Revolution, and replaced by the Protestant William and Mary, and thence by the House of Hanover. The Stuart Pretender, Charles Edward — known to history as Bonnie Prince Charlie — tried to take back the throne by raising a rebellion in Scotland in 1745, and then moving south into England.

== Description ==
The '45 is a board wargame for 2 players, where one player controls Scottish rebels, while the other controls English forces.

=== Components ===
The game box includes 352 counters, a 24-page rulebook, various player aids, and a 22" x 34" map of England and Scotland, divided into regions.

=== Gameplay ===
The game uses a simple "I Go, You Go" sequence taken from the American Civil War wargame A House Divided (Game Designers Workshop, 1981), where one player receives reinforcements, moves naval forces, moves land forces, attacks, and checks attrition. The other player then has the same opportunities. Critic Andrew Maly called this "enough variety in the terrain-types and sheer number of boxes [on the map] to provide ample opportunity for maneuver and testing different strategies."

Each military unit counter has pips along each edge. The leading edge facing the enemy player represents its current strength. Care must be taken to maintain proper orientation at all times.

Units cannot move without a leader. If two leaders are in the same stack, the highest ranking leader has to lead, even if his military competence is lower than the other leader.

There are also rules for navies, forced marches, attrition and fortifications.

=== Fog of war ===
The instill a fog of war on the game, a player cannot look at an opponent's stack of counters until the player has moved at least one unit (and accompanying leader) into the same hex as the opposing stack.

=== Combat ===
Combat is fought over a number of rounds until one side or the other is forced to retreat away from the hex. The attacker has a decisive advantage, but every second round, the defender can try to switch his side over to the attack.

=== Political dimension ===
The Scottish player can parlay successes into a French intervention, up to and including an invasion, leading to significant reinforcements. Likewise, if the Scottish player can convince other clans to join the rebellion, the prince will receive more support.

=== Scenarios ===
The game comes with chronologically linked scenarios that divide the rebellion into six phases. The six scenarios can also be combined into one campaign game with one victory condition: The Scots win if they can take and hold London. Any other result is an English victory.

== Publication history ==
The '45 was designed by Geoffrey Geddes, with cartography by Beth Queman. It was published by Decision Games in 1995.

== Reception ==
In Issue 92 of the British wargaming magazine Perfidious Albion, Charles Vasey noted that "while the game is good and original, the parts that are original are not good, [and the parts that are good are not original]." Vasey particularly had issues with the strength and speed of the Scottish forces, finding them unhistorically too powerful and too fast. Vasey did think the naval rules were "excellent" and the map was "very clear." But Vasey found many rules questionable and felt the designer had "simply stopped short of finishing his game ... If [designer Geoff Geddes] had but used a longer development process, I believe a number of weaknesses could have been removed." Vasey concluded "[The game] means well and it has solid successes at the micro-historical level. But when we come to the macro-level it begins to go to hell in a hand-cart. The whole game needs tidying up and each current strategy considered from the point of historical possibilities ... It fails to pay due respect to the topic that inspired it — the devotion of some clans to a mad idea."

In Issue 7 of the French games magazine Vae Victis, Théophile Monnier compared The '45 to rival game The King's War (Clash of Arms, 1989), and thought The '45 was superior is most aspects. "The '45 is far more accessible and engaging. The military aspect is more developed ... The political dimension is also richer ... Naval operations are well-integrated, with rules covering troop transport and naval combat. Finally, the rules — of reasonable complexity — are clearly written and include numerous examples." Monnier concluded, "The '45 is far more appealing than The King's War and is highly likely to interest French players in the turbulent history of [England]."

Andrew Maly, writing for Zone of Control, liked the rules, calling them "clean with few questions. The game flows well, and the straightforward mechanics run smoothly." Maly did note the difficulty of keeping the strength of a counter displayed in the proper orientation, pointing out that "Stacks [of counters] can get rather large, so it doesn't take much to inflict a royal disaster." Maly also found other problems, including omissions from the map, spelling errors in the rules, and difficulties in scenario set ups. Maly concluded by giving ratings of "Average" for gameplay and "Good" for historicity, saying, "The game succeeds very well in bringing an obscure subject to life. If you're interested in English history, have a craving for the esoteric, or just want something completely different for your next game, you should find The '45 to your liking."
