= What the Heck? =

Board game published in 1988

Cover of German 1st edition, 1988

What the Heck? is the North American title of a card game originally designed by Alex Randolph and published in Germany in 1988 by Ravensburger under the title Hol's der Geier ("The Vulture Gets It"). The game has subsequently been marketed in a number of countries under various titles.

== Description ==
What the Heck? is a game for 2–5 players in which players attempt to win Mouse cards while avoiding Vulture cards. The game has the following components:

- Ten Mouse cards, which score from 1 to 10 points
- Five Vulture cards, which score from -1 to -5 points
- Five sets of color-coded bidding cards numbered 1 to 15

=== Setup ===
The ten Mouse cards with positive scores and five Vulture cards with negative scores are shuffled and turned facedown. Each player receives one of the sets of bidding cards.

=== Gameplay ===
The first card in the deck is turned over to reveal either a Mouse or a Vulture. Each player selects a bidding card in their hand and places it facedown; these are all then revealed simultaneously. If the animal card is a Mouse, it is claimed by the player who played the highest unique number. If the card is a Vulture, it is given to the player who played the lowest unique number.

Example: In a 5-player game, the first card turned over is a Mouse with a score of +9. Every player tries to play the highest bidding card, hoping that the same number won't be played by another player. When the bidding cards are revealed simultaneously, two players have played 15s, two players have played 14s and the fifth player has played a 13. Although the 13 is the lowest card played, it is the highest unique card, and the player who played it claims the Mouse. The next card to be turned over is a Vulture with a score of -3. Two players bid 10s, and the other three players play a 12, an 11 and a 9. The 9 is the lowest unique card, and the Vulture is given to that player.

At the end of 15 rounds, when all bidding cards have been used, each player adds up their positive Mouse scores and negative Vulture scores. The player with the highest total is the winner.

== Publication history ==
In 1988, Alex Randolph designed a children's card game, which was published by Ravensburger in Germany as Hol's der Geier. Since then, the game has continued to be published in other countries using different titles, and sometimes, different animals. For example, in the Italian version Il Gioco dei Gatti, the vultures are replaced with cats, and in the Chinese version, the mice are changed to meerkats.

- Italy: In bocca al lupo! (Good Luck!, Ravensburger),Il Gioco dei Gatti (The Game of Cats, Dal Negro), and Accipicchia! (Wow!, Oliphante)
- The Netherlands: Drommels, nog aan toe! (Damn!, Ravensburger) and Pas op voor de gier (Watch Out for the Vulture, Ravensburger)
- Czech Republic/Slovakia: Sup aby to vzai! (Vulture Takes It!)
- Finland/Sweden: Korppikotka (Vulture, Ravensburger)
- UK: Teacher's Pet (Waddingtons)
- France: Stupide Vautour (Stupid Vulture, Ravensburger, Asmodée, and Gigamic)
- Japan: ハゲタカのえじき (Vulture Prey, Ravensburger and Möbius)
- North America: What the Heck? (Winning Moves Games and AMIGO), Beat the Buzzard (Ravensburger), and Raj (Winning Moves)
- Scandinavia: Catch Up! (Ravensburger)
- Spain: Raj (Morapiaf) and Carrera Carroña (Carrion Race, Fractal Juegos)
- China: 獴鷲派對 (Meerkat Party, Swan Panasia)
- Korea: 독수리 눈치 싸움 (Eagle Eye Fight, Korean Board Games)

== Reception ==
In Issue 2 of Games International, Brian Walker called the game "Simple, but like home delivery pizza, it's amazing nobody thought of it before." Walker concluded by giving the game a very good rating of 4 stars out of 5, saying, "The cards are of good quality stock, and like all Ravensburger games the packaging is superb. This is the ideal Christmas party game for 2-5 players."

Writing for the German review site FAIRspielt im Norden, Carsten Wesel commented, "It doesn't always have to be big games that manage to captivate a handful of players. Hol's der Geier still fascinates despite its incredibly simple rules." Wesel also liked the quickness of the game and its brevity, noting that a strategy used in one round might not succeed in the next. Wesel concluded that it was "a fast paced and very entertaining game that has since become a classic even though it only dates from the late 80's."

== Awards ==
Hol's der Geier was a finalist for the 1988 Spiel des Jahres.

== Other recognition ==
A copy of Hol's der Geier is held in the Alexander Randolph Viewing Collection at the Nuremberg Museum.

== See also ==
- Goofspiel, a similar game
