= Feudal (game) =

Abstract strategy board game

- Feudal box cover image
- Publishers: 3M, Avalon Hill, Schmidt International
- Years active: 1967-present
- Players: 2-6
- Setup time: 1-5 minutes
- Playing time: 90 minutes
- Chance: Concealed setup
- Age range: 10-up
- Skills: Strategy

Feudal is a chess-like board wargame for 2–6 players on two or four opposing sides. It was originally published by 3M Company in 1967 as part of its bookshelf game series, and was republished by Avalon Hill after they purchased 3M's game division. The object of the game is to either occupy one's opponent's castle or to capture all of one's opponent's royalty. There are six sets of plastic pieces in three shades each of blue and brown. Each set consists of thirteen mobile figures with differing methods of movement and attack, and a stationary castle piece. The play area consists of four plastic peg boards depicting empty, rough, and mountainous terrain.

== History ==
Feudal was originally published by 3M in 1967 as part of its bookshelf game series and later reissued by 3M in 1969 and 1973. It was reissued in 1976 and 1981 by Avalon Hill. A new German edition was issued in 1979 by Schmidt International, though the first German edition was issued by 3M in 1967.

== Setting ==
The game takes place in the Middle Ages, where two fictional feudal kingdoms—one led by Ethelred the Great, the other by Aelfric the Barbaric—vied for control of territory which lay between their borders. Each had called upon his son, the prince, and his brother, the duke, to help command his army. The feud had lasted generations but on this day both kings had come to the conclusion that the only way to settle the dispute was to conquer their rival's kingdom. To this end, both kings, each supported by their respective prince and duke, prepared to invade and conquer the enemy. It is at this point that gameplay begins.

== Gameplay ==
Feudal is won by either capturing your opponent's castle or slaying all of his royalty (i.e. King, Prince, and Duke). Each of the six armies contains a castlepiece, one each of the royalty, one Squire, one Archer, two Knights, two Sergeants, and four Pikemen. The castlepiece has two parts, the castle and the castle green (entrance), each of which takes up one board space. To capture the castle, a figure must first be moved onto the green and wait one turn before moving into the castle proper. A player may defend his/her castle by placing a figure (except the archer or squire) inside.

=== Two-player game ===
In a two-player game, one player takes a blue army and the other takes a brown army. The players toss a coin; the winner of the toss moves first and the loser of the toss may select two adjoining quadrants of the board on which to set up his forces. A divider screen is placed across the board and both players set up their pieces in secret. Once both players are ready the screen is removed and play begins. A player may move any number of pieces during his/her turn but he/she must move at least one.

=== Team play (3–6 players) ===
In team play a captain is chosen for both the blue and brown armies. The captain selects an army complete with castle and royalty; his teammate(s) select another army of the same color but do not receive a castle or royalty. Instead, the captain grants his/her teammate(s) his prince and/or duke to "lead" their forces. If there is an odd number of players, the captain of the short team gains the use of an additional army (minus castle and royalty) so that each side remains even. Gameplay otherwise resembles a two-player game.

=== Alternate 4-player game ===
Rather than a team format, four players may each select their own army and take a single quadrant of the board for their own. This game plays as a free-for-all. However, unlike two-player or team play, the only way to eliminate an opponent is by capturing their castle. When a player's castle is captured, it is removed from the board along with any remaining royalty. Additionally, any of the player's remaining pieces fall under the command of the conquering player on his/her next turn.

== Figures ==
Figure	Rank	Number per color	Move	Description
	King	1		The King may move 1 or 2 spaces in any direction (orthogonally or diagonally).
	Prince	1		The Prince units may move any number of spaces in any direction but may not move through rough terrain.
	Duke	1		The Duke may move any number of spaces in any direction but may not move through rough terrain.
	Knight	2		Knights may move any number of spaces in any direction but may not move through rough terrain.
	Archer	1		The archer moves or shoots up to 3 spaces. If it shoots an enemy the enemy is removed but the archer need not move into the enemy's space.
	Sergeant	2		Sergeants may move up to 12 spaces diagonally or 1 space orthogonally.
	Pikeman	4		Pikemen may move up to 12 spaces orthogonally or 1 space diagonally.
	Squire	1		The squire moves 1 space orthogonally followed by 1 space diagonally. It may move through either vacant or occupied spaces. This is comparable to the knight's move in chess.

== Board layout ==
The board is made up of four square panels, each comprising 12 x 12 movement spaces. The mountains and rough terrain are scattered throughout the board space. The separability of the four panels allows a variety of board layouts, as each may be freely turned to change the landscape of the board.

== Reception ==
Games magazine included Feudal in their "Top 100 Games of 1980", calling it a "chess-like game" and noting that "The initial set-up is done simultaneously and secretly, so you face different types of strategic problems each game."

Games magazine included Feudal in their "Top 100 Games of 1981", noting that "the initial set-up is done secretly, so the game is constantly surprising".

Games & Puzzles felt that the ideal version of the game was the two-player version with each player having two armies, but concluded that there was "very little classifiable strategy". The Playboy Winner's Guide to Board Games thought that the game was not "entirely successful", with the fact that players moved all of their pieces each turn reducing the gambit and planning aspect of chess.

Games magazine gave it 5/5 for originality and replayability.

Feudal has received 950 ratings with an average rating of 5.92 (on a 1–10 scale) on Board Game Geek. Detractors complain that the game's complexity lends to an in-game analysis time that can potentially exceed opponents' span of interest; though the same can be said of the game of chess.

== Gallery ==
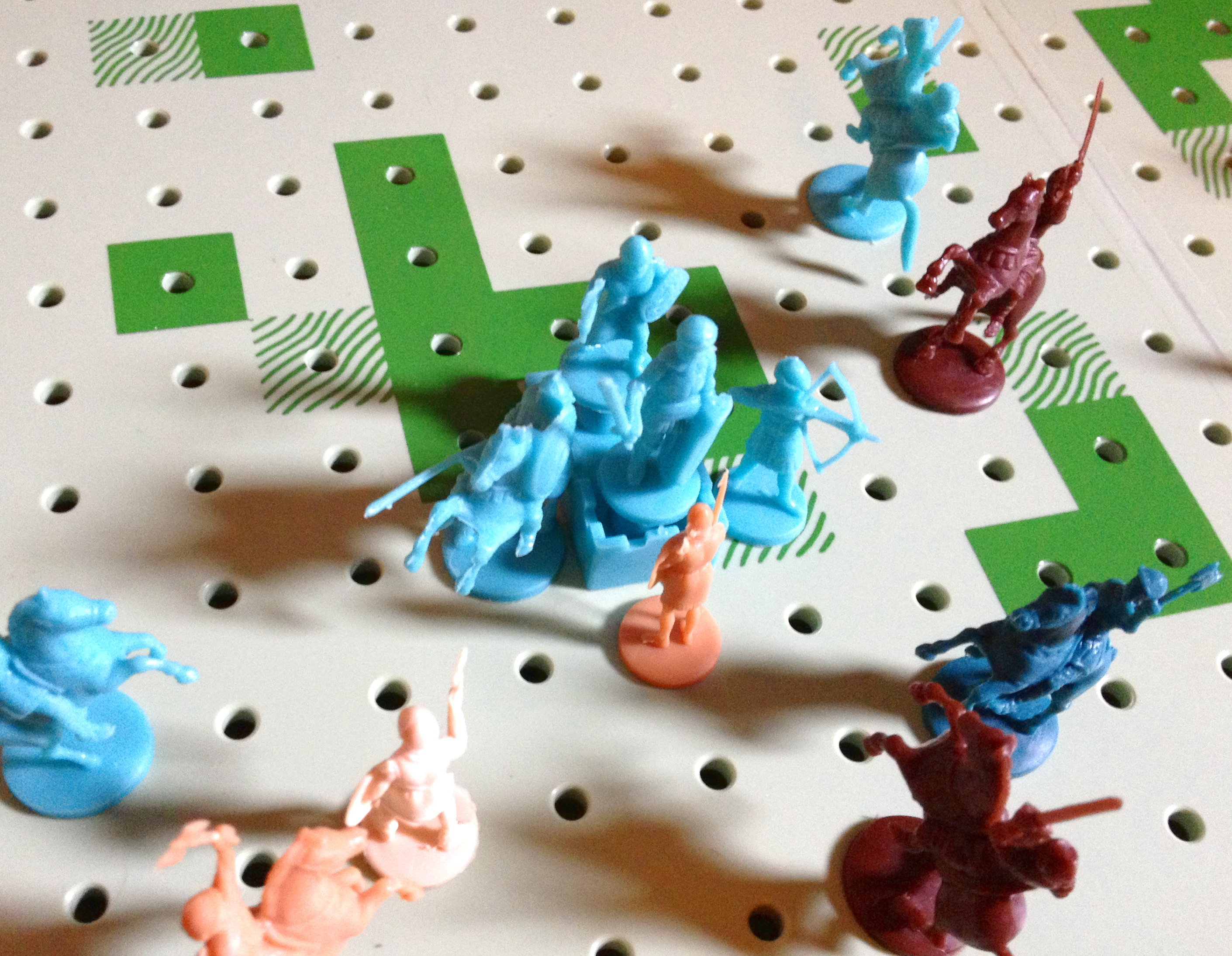
Overview of a game in progress

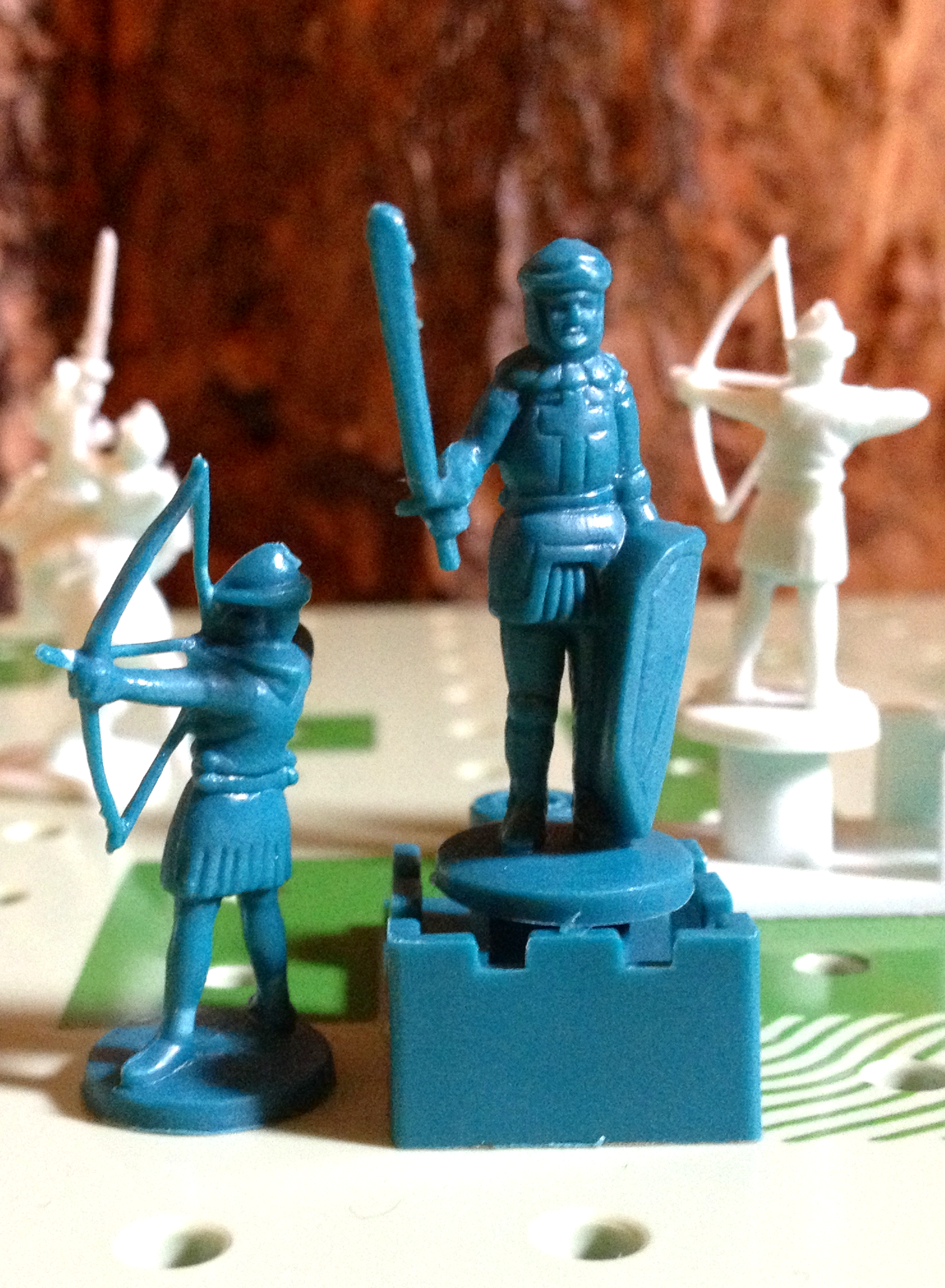
A king in his castle

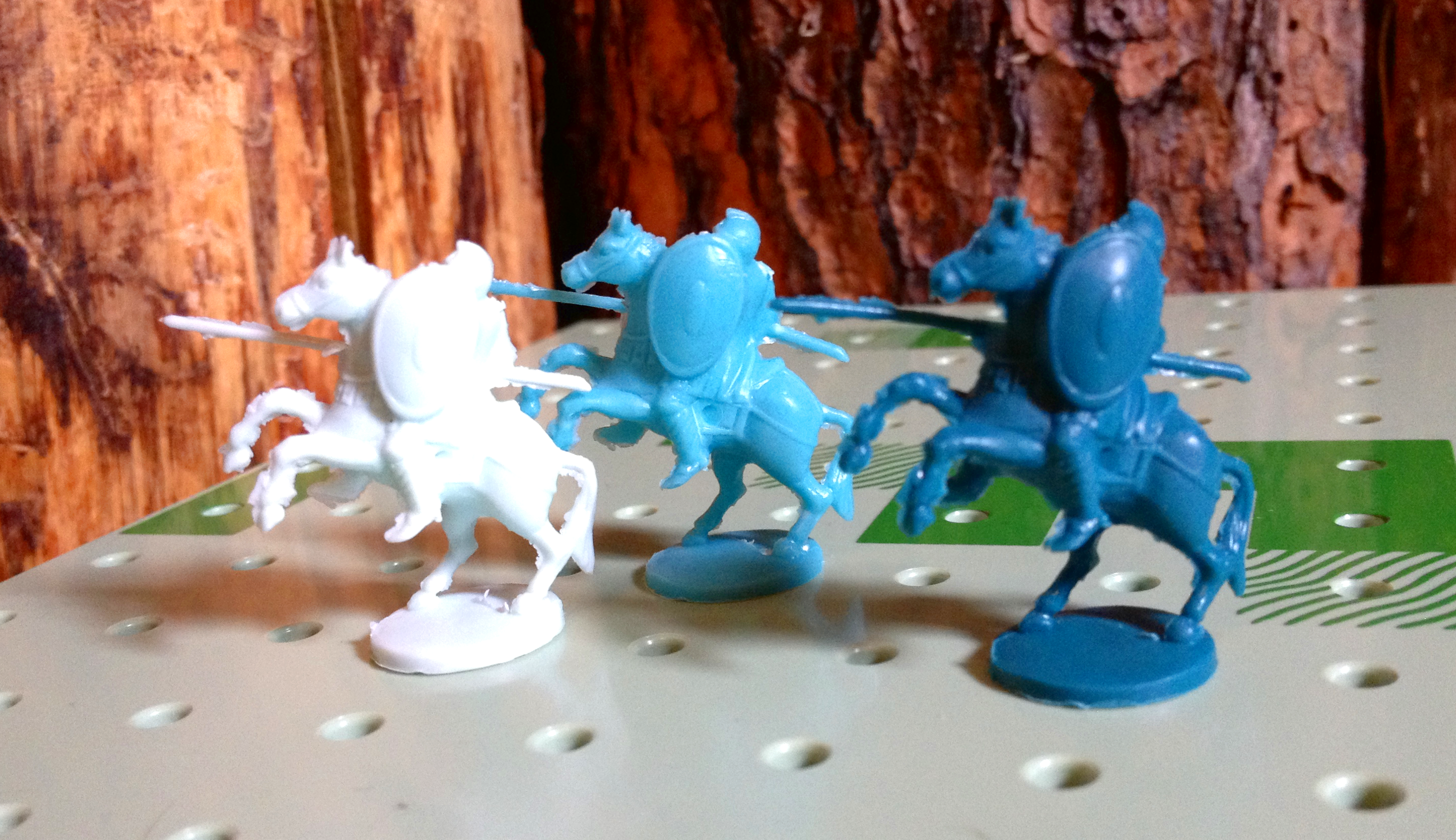
Three princes

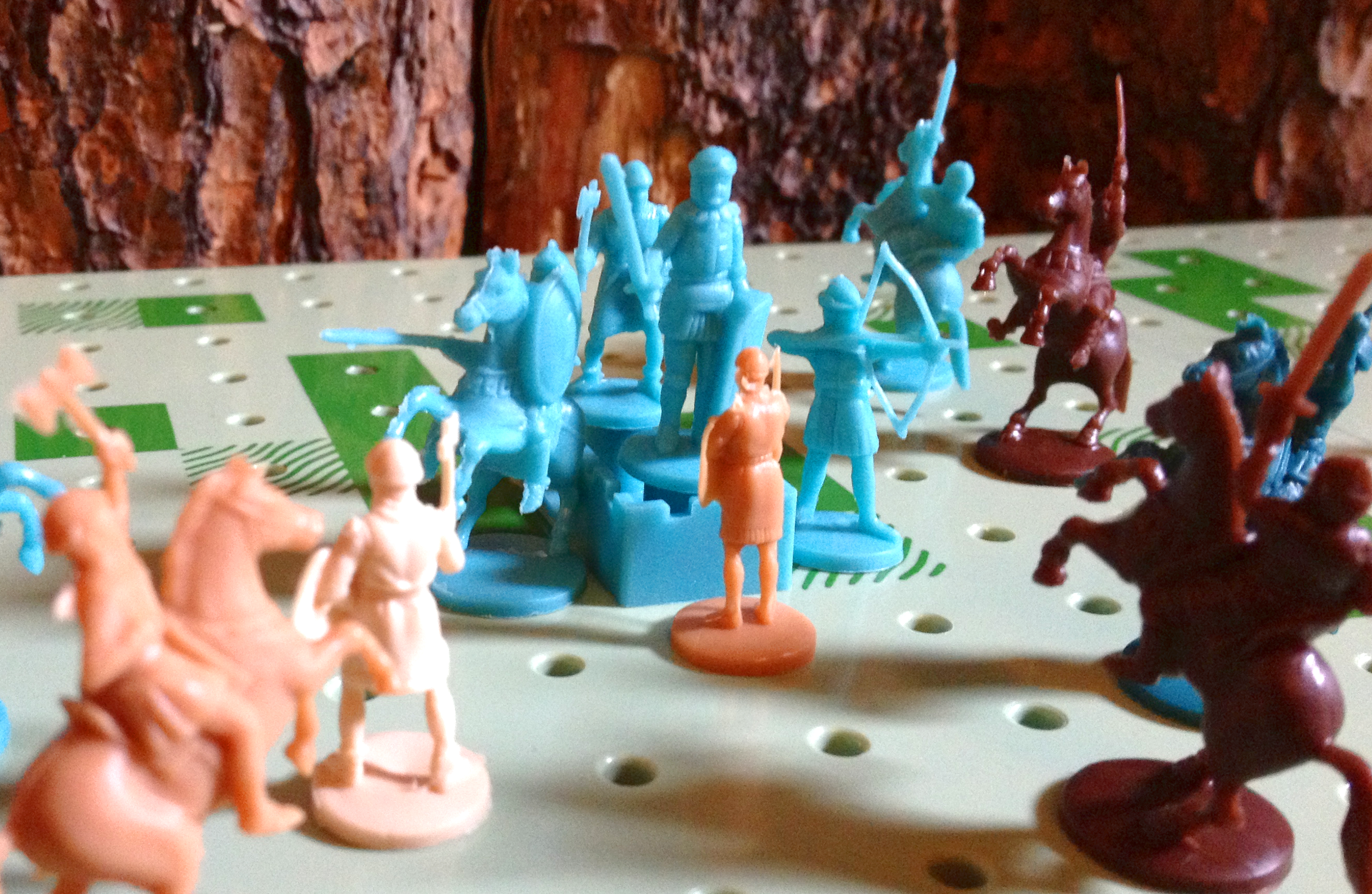
A well-defended castle
