= Ricochet Robots =

Puzzle board game for 2 or more people

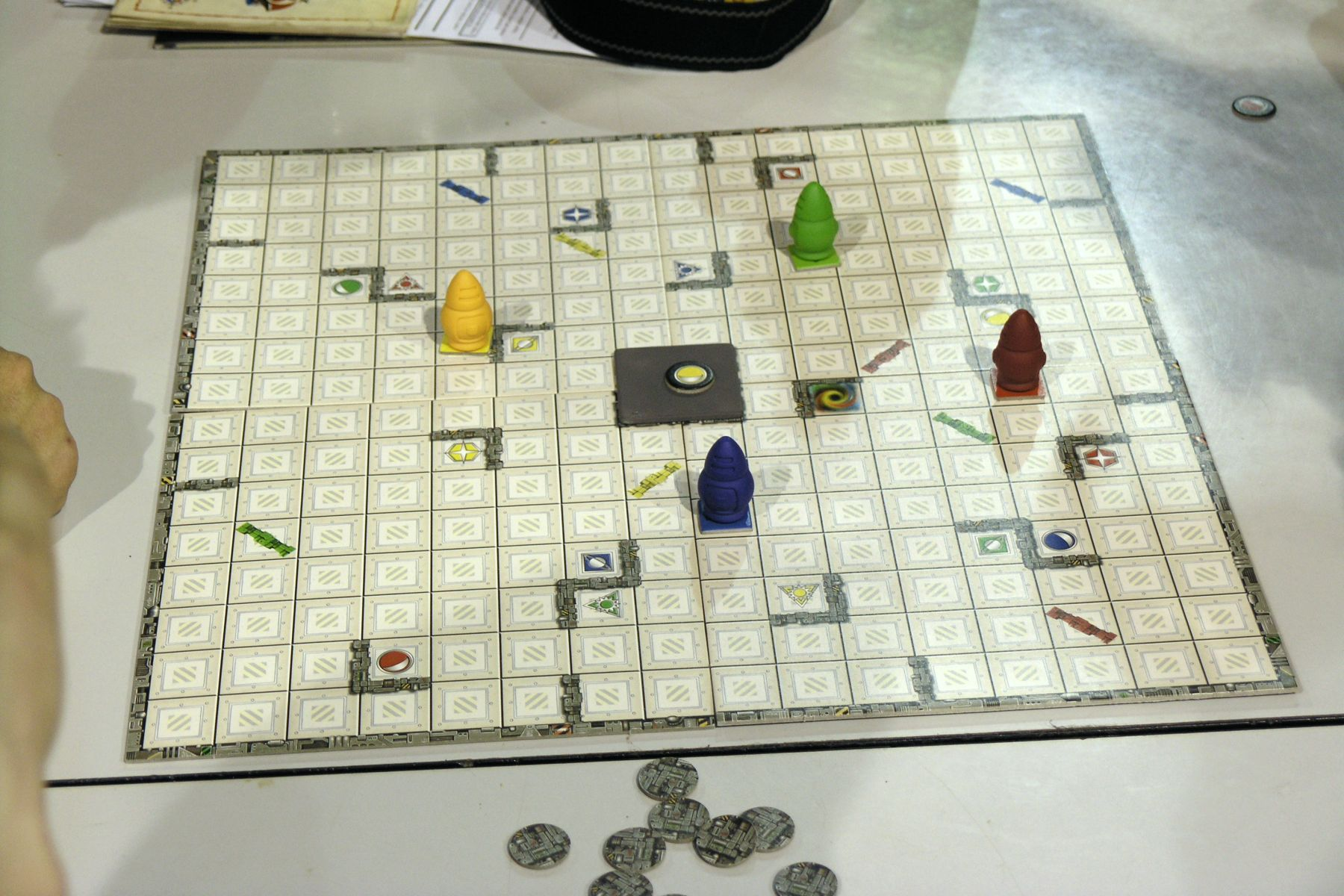
- A game of Ricochet Robots in progress.
- Designers: Alex Randolph
- Publishers: Rio Grande Games
- Players: 2 or more
- Setup time: < 5 minutes
- Playing time: 15 to 45 minutes
- Chance: None
- Age range: 9 and older
- Skills: Problem solving; Route visualisation

Ricochet Robots is a puzzle board game for 2 or more people, designed by Alex Randolph, in which the playing pieces (robots) must be moved to selected locations in as few moves as possible, working within strict limitations on robots' movements. The game was first published in Germany in 1999 as Rasende Roboter. An English version was published by Rio Grande Games.

== Gameplay ==
The board consists of four double-sided quarters, each with a hole in a corner; these corners meet in the middle of the board, where a plastic piece with four stubs holds them in place. Board quarters can be permuted and flipped over to give 96 different board arrangements. There are also 17 chips, 16 with a symbol on a colored background and one multicolored corresponding exactly to a field on the board. At the beginning of play, four colored robots (also matching the colored fields) are placed randomly on the board and one of the chips is turned over.

The object of the game is to bring the robot of the correct colour to the field indicated on the overturned chip using as few moves as possible. Any of the robots can be moved horizontally or vertically, and they do not stop until they reach an obstacle — either a wall or another robot. As soon as one of the players has found a solution, they state the total number of moves for all of the robots used and start a timer. Then every player has the chance to state the number of moves for their solution until the time runs out. After that, the player who stated the lowest number of moves shows their solution. If they correctly demonstrate a solution in the stated number of moves or less, they earn the chip. If not, the player with the next higher number may try, and so on; then a new chip is turned over and a new round begins. After all 17 chips have been used up, the player with the most chips wins the game.

== Problem-solving implications ==
Because of Ricochet Robots' game structure and complex problem solving techniques, it has been the subject of academic study. The study, argues that Ricochet Robots is a good game to analyze problem solving techniques of humans and computers. Although Ricochet Robots has an initially exponential increase in complexity, it is solvable by polynomial time algorithms. This is because the number of possible positions is greatly limited by the relatively low number of robots (four or five) and so an efficient algorithm may search through all possible positions.

== Editions ==
Three editions were published by Rio Grande Games. The first edition was called Ricochet Robot (without the s). It was identical to the original Rasende Roboter. This edition was replaced by the 3rd edition.

The second edition, called Ricochet Robots (also known as the blue version, because of the blue box), contained one more robot (a black robot) and adds 45 degrees walls on the boards, which complicates the game. The boards of the 2nd and original/3rd editions are compatible and can be mixed up. This edition is out of print at the moment.

The third edition is still called Ricochet Robots, but is the same as the original except it adds an extra silver robot.

The latest edition from Z-Man Games, has eight two-sided boards that can be combined for over 1,500 board configurations.

== Variations ==
54 game variations (different rules) using the silver robot have been added by players.

== Reviews ==
- Family Games: The 100 Best
