= Mr. President (board game) =

Board game published in 1967

Mr. President is board game published by 3M in 1967 as part of their bookshelf game series that simulates the political race for presidency of the United States.

== Gameplay ==
Mr. President is a board game for 2–4 players designed to represent an actual Presidential campaign using data from the 1960s.

In a two-player game, one player chooses to represent the Republican Party and the other the Democratic Party. Each player looks at cards representing various fictional candidates that list their strengths and weaknesses in various fields such as campaigning, fundraising, and press support, and chooses one candidate for President, and another for Vice-President. In 3- or 4-player games, two players choose candidates for President, and the remaining player or players choose candidates for Vice-President.

During the game, players must decide which states to campaign in, and how best to invest time and energy. Each player earns and banks votes in each state. Variant rules allow for advertising, donations and debate topics.

At the conclusion of the game, the total number of votes in each state is determined, to see which party obtains the winning number of Electoral College votes.

== Publication history ==
Mr. President was designed by Jack Carmichael, and was published by 3M as part of their "3M Bookshelf Games" series in 1967, as potential candidates for 1968 election campaign began to marshall their forces. The topics up for debate reflect the issues of the day, for example, the American space program.

In 1971, 3M released a revised second edition of the game, just before the start of the 1972 election campaign, and a third edition in 1972.

== Reception ==
Time commented, "By the final tally, players will have suffered—on paper, anyway—all the slings and arrows that a live presidential campaigner must endure" and concluded "In some ways, the verisimilitude to the realities of real life politics is downright cynical. The best candidate is not always the winner; sometimes it is the candidate with the most money."

The Arlington Heights Daily Herald called this "a battle of strategy" geared "for teen-agers and adults", concluding that it was "an excellent refresher course for boning up on politics.

Alan R. Moon reviewed Mr. President for Games International magazine and stated that "It's a great game to play repeatedly with the same opponent [...] because players (myself included) tend to become fixated on certain states and regions, and play their cards within this tunnel of vision. This, of course, creates an element of psychology in the game as one player tries to outguess the other, relying on their opponent's tendencies realised from earlier games."

Spotlight on Games noted that in a 3- or 4-player game, there is no way for the players representing Vice-Presidential candidates to win the game, and concluded, "Rather dated today, both in terms of its electoral vote totals and its play."

Writing for Mit 80 Spielen durch das Jahr in 2021, Wieland Herald called the fact that Mr. President was never marketed in Germany "a pity [...] The fundamental decisions about which states to fight and which to surrender are exciting." Herald concluded "On the one hand, Mr. President is a piece of contemporary history in the USA in the 1960s, on the other hand the hidden card use is a game element that is still relevant today."

== Reviews ==
- Moves #4, p18
