= Auction (website) =

Online auction company based in South Korea

- Type: Subsidiary
- Industry: Online auction
- Founded: April 1998; 28 years ago South Korea
- Headquarters: South Korea
- Parent: Gmarket Global

Auction Co. is an online auction company based in South Korea. It was acquired by eBay on January 8, 2001.

== 2008 Security Breach ==
In April 2008, the company revealed that their customers' real name, username, resident registration number, address, phone number, email address, bank account number, and purchase and refund log were breached in February. Originally, the victims were thought to be 11 million users, but later it was found that the private information of all members of Auction, 18,630,000 thousand people, was breached. Users filed a lawsuit against the company, but Court denied the responsibility of the company.
