= Bookshelf game =

A bookshelf game, sometimes known as a bookcase game, is a style of boardgame published mostly in the 1970s and 1980s.

The two best-known examples of bookshelf games are a series by 3M and much of Avalon Hill's catalog of the 1980s.
