= High-Bid =

Board game published in 1965

Box cover of 3M edition, 1963

High-Bid is a board game published in 1963 by 3M that simulates the buying and selling of items via auction. The game was acquired in the mid-1970s by Avalon Hill and re-published under two titles: The Collector and Auction.

== Contents ==
High-Bid is a game in which players complete collections of rare items and make money buying and selling to other collectors.

=== Gameplay: 3M ===
In the editions published by 3M, a player may acquire items via auction, and may sell items in their hand to other players for a value indicated by a die roll. This can be anywhere from 25% to 100% of the property's theoretical value. Players attempt to put together a set of related items. The first player to attain a worth of $5000 in completed sets and cash is the winner.

=== Gameplay: Avalon Hill ===
In the editions published by Avalon Hill, the amount needed to win was raised to $7500. Also, a "Rich Collector" can appear via a Special Events card deck to purchase at full price items of the most expensive collections. In addition, a "Buyer's Card" can be used as a wild card to complete a set.

== Publication history ==
Larry and Pearl Winters designed High-Bid and it was published by 3M in 1963. It sold well, and 3M came out with new editions in 1964, 1965, 1967, 1968, 1970 and 1975. Avalon Hill then acquired the license for the game, and produced a new edition titled The Collector in 1977, and an edition with the title Auction in 1989.

In 1989, Swedish publisher Casper created a Swedish-language edition titled Första, Andra, Tredje! (First, Second, Third!)

== Reception ==
In A Player's Guide to Table Games, John Jackson noted that "In practice, the completion of one or two medium-value sets is enough to win; the high-value sets take too long to collect." He concluded "If gratuitous awards for rolling the right number on a die or landing on the proper space is your idea of excitement, then High Bid [...] may afford you hours of fun. Otherwise, look elsewhere."

In The Playboy Winner's Guide to Board Games, Jon Freeman thought the Avalon Hill edition titled The Collector "is certainly a better game than High Bid was. Unfortunately, that's still not saying much."

Although the game had been a popular product for 3M for over twenty years, The Avalon Hill Game Co. General Index and Company History, 1952-1980 reported in 1980 that their edition titled The Collector "has never sold well."

Ian Livingstone reviewed Auction for Games International magazine, and gave it 2 1/2 stars out of 5, stating that "As a person who enjoys going to auctions, I'm afraid I found this simulation rather disappointing despite its promise."
