= Alex Randolph =

Bohemian-American game designer and writer

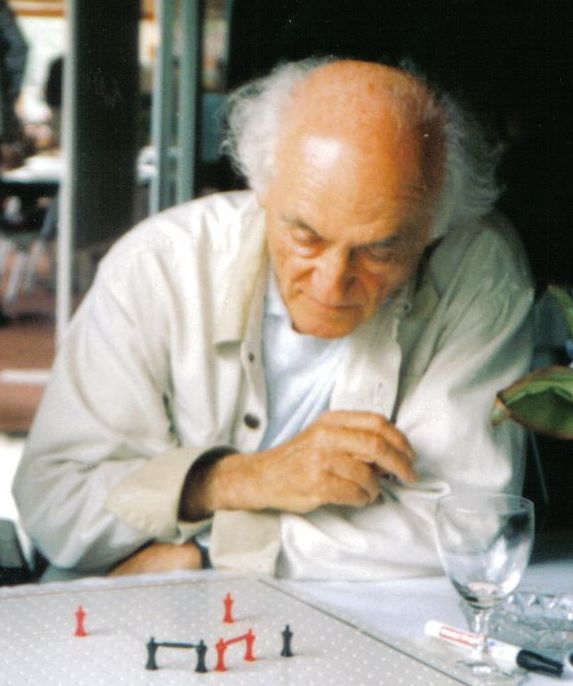
Alex Randolph playing his game Twixt in 1998

Alexander Randolph (4 May 1922 – 27 April 2004) was an American designer of board games and writer. Alex Randolph's game creations include TwixT, Breakthru, Hol's der Geier, Inkognito (with Leo Colovini), Raj, Ricochet Robot, and Enchanted Forest (with Michael Matschoss).

== Biography ==
Alexander Randolph was born on 4 May 1922 in Czechoslovakia where his parents spent four years coming from the USA. He was the son of self-described "rich parents". His father Samuel Alexander was an artist painter born in Odessa, Russian Empire (1878–1944) and his mother Mary (1882–1955) was an American sculptor. Alex and his half-brother Christopher Craig spent their childhood and teenage in Venice, Italy. They both attended a private school in Switzerland. The Randolph family owned the Palazzetto Stern along the Grand Canal in Dorsoduro in Venice from 1924 to ~1946-47. Randolf spent his early years in various occupations, including military intelligence and as an advertising copy editor in Boston.

In 1961, Randolph moved to Japan and became a professional game developer, performing initial work on TwixT. During this time, he became a dan player in shogi.

In 1962, Randolph (along with Sid Sackson) was commissioned to start a new game division for Minnesota Mining and Manufacturing (also known as 3M). Through 3M, Randolph created and published such games as Breakthru, Evade, Oh-Wah-Ree, and TwixT.

Randolph moved back to Venice, Italy in 1968, continuing his career as a game developer with the company Venice Connection established with Dario De Toffoli and Leo Colovini.

Randolph was married to Gertrude Eisenstadt (1921–2008), an American.

Randolph died aged 82 in Venice on 27 April 2004 and was buried in San Michele Cemetery in Venice.

Randolf wrote 3 books. Also, two biographies were written about Randolf: Die Sonnenseite by Philippe Evrard and Alex Randolph : Artista e autore di giochi by Cosimo Cardellicchio.

== Recognition ==
In 2016, as a testimony to his career, Fabulous Games published ADDX – the first ever digital game from Alex Randolph.

Following Randolph's death, the Nuremberg Museum set up a special permanent collection of Randolph's games titled the Alexander Randolph Viewing Collection.

== Awards ==
=== Spiel des Jahres ===
Game of the Year

1982 for Enchanted Forest

Children's Game of the Year

1989 for Gute Freunde
1997 for Leinen Los!

Special Awards

1996 Most Beautiful Game for Venice Connection
1988 Most Beautiful game for Inkognito

=== Origins Awards Hall of Fame ===
Hall of Fame

2011 induction as a designer
2011 induction of TwixT
