= Games & Puzzles =

UK magazine, 1972–1981 and 1994–1996

- May 1972 issue
- Categories: Game
- First issue: May 1972
- Final issue: 1996
- Company: Edu-Games (UK) Ltd.
- Country: United Kingdom
- Based in: London, England
- Language: English

Games & Puzzles was a magazine about games and puzzles.

== Publication history ==
The magazine was first published in May 1972 by Edu-Games (UK) Ltd. The first editor was Graeme Levin who recruited a variety of games and puzzles experts as writers and consultant editors including Darryl Francis, David Parlett, David Pritchard, Don Turnbull, Eric Solomon, Gyles Brandreth, Nick Palmer, R. C. Bell, Richard Sharp, Sid Sackson and Tony Buzan. Its headquarters was in London.

The magazine ceased publication in 1981 but was relaunched in 1994, and then stopped again in 1996. During its last period, between 1994 and 1996, the publisher was Games & Puzzles Publications.

== Reception ==
Recruiting experts gave it a good reputation; for example, Popular Computing wrote "Quite simply, Games & Puzzles Magazine is unique. There is no other publication quite like it anywhere in the world."

In Issue 10 of the British wargaming zine Perfidious Albion, Charles Vasey called this "The pro-abstract game 'zine" because of the many abstract games found in its pages. Vasey also noted that it "contains notes on many games ... articles on Infinity, chess, cheating at same, myriad card games, stacks of puzzles and problems, crosswords, etc. There is even some board-game reviews by that young blackguard Nicky Palmer." Vasey concluded, "G&P are increasing their board-gaming content, but it is not primarily a wargaming magazine."

== Reviews ==
- Perfidious Albion #10 (October 1976) p.17
- Perfidious Albion #12 (December 1976) p.15
- Perfidious Albion #13 (January 1977) p.14
- Perfidious Albion #14 (February 1977) p.17
- Perfidious Albion #15 (March 1977) p.17
- Perfidious Albion #16 (April 1977) p.16
