= Bonaparte in Italy =

1979 Napoleonic board wargame

- Cover featuring Napoleon at the Saint-Bernard Pass by Jacques-Louis David
- Designers: Kevin Zucker
- Publishers: Operational Studies Group
- Publication: 1979
- Genres: Napoleonic

Bonaparte in Italy is a board wargame published by Operational Studies Group (OSG) in 1979 that simulates the Italian Campaign of 1796–1797 led by Napoleon Bonaparte.

== Background ==
In 1796, the young and untested Napoleon was given command of France's Army of Italy, largely due to the influence of his new wife, Joséphine de Beauharnais. Napoleon arrived to find the army largely quiescent, but quickly roused it and set off, determined to defeat the Kingdom of Sardinia in Piedmont before their Austrian allies could intervene. If he was successful, this would leave the way clear to besieging the city of Mantua, which in turn would open the door to Austria itself.

== Description ==
Bonaparte in Italy is a Napoleonic board wargame for two players in which one controls the French forces, and the other controls their opponents. The hex grid game map, scaled at 3.2 kilometres (2.0 mi) per hex, is composed of three 22" x 34" sections; each scenario uses only one or two of the maps. Although there are 300 counters, only leaders are placed on the board — the units under their command are gathered off the map in strategic displays to show their current strength.

=== Gameplay ===
The game uses the system developed by OSG for the previously published Napoleon at Bay.

=== Supply ===
The generally poor state of the Po Valley at that time and the resultant lack of foragable food is reflected in significant attrition each turn. Losses due to attrition are calculated in units of 200 soldiers. When losses reach 1000, the unit's Strength Points are reduced. As critic Charles Vasey noted, "if you march hard through bad terrain you can lose a very great number of men, often more than you lose in combat."

=== Movement ===
The active player receives a pool of Administrative Points at the start of their turn. The player can choose to move units using one of two methods:

1. Use an Administrative Point: Attrition will be based on the unit's supplies and distance marched.
2. Use Leader's Initiative: The player rolls a die. If the result is equal to or less than the leader's Initiative Rating, then the unit can move. However, attrition is based on distance travelled and forage values determined at the end of the march.

=== Reaction ===
Once the active player has finished moving, the non-active player has a chance to react by Force-Marching units, again rolling a die versus the leader's initiative. If the unit can move, it can leave an enemy's zone of control before the active player's combat phase.

=== Combat ===
The active player must attack all adjacent enemy units. Once combat is finished, retreats and pursuits are resolved, then disorganized troops have a chance to rally. Once rallying has been resolved, the active player's turn ends and it is the other player's turn.

=== Scenarios ===
The game comes with seven scenarios representing the various battles fought by Napoleon during the Italian campaign:

- "Montenotte": The French must push the Piedemontese into an armistice in 7 turns.
- "Lodi": The French must clear the Austrians from the western-most map in 4 turns.
- "Borghetto": The French must clear Genoa and Milan of Austrians in 5 turns.

The last four scenarios each deal with a phase of the French siege of Mantua, each marked by a different battle as Austrian armies arrive and attempt to lift the siege

- "Castiglione" (6 turns)
- "Bassano"(8 turns)
- "Arcola" (12 turns)
- "Rivoli" (11 turns)

An eighth scenario, "Marengo", simulates Napoleon's return to Italy three years later for the Battle of Marengo.

== Publication history ==
Kevin Zucker, a managing editor for wargame publisher Simulations Publications, Inc., decided to start up his own games company, Tactical Studies Group, in 1978. Due to the similarity between the company name "Tactical Studies Group" and "Tactical Studies Rules" (TSR – the publisher of Dungeons & Dragons) — Zucker quickly changed the company name to Operational Studies Group (OSG).

Zucker conceived of a series of board wargames titled "Campaigns of Napoleon" that would use a new game system, and published the first of the series, Napoleon at Bay, in 1978. The next in the series was to be Bonaparte in Italy, but in order to promote sales and teach players the new game system, in 1979 OSG released two introductory microgames titled Arcola: The Battle for Italy, 1796 and Battles of the Hundred Days. These were then followed by the much larger Bonaparte in Italy, again designed by Zucker, which was released in 1979 with interior artwork by Larry Catalano, and with the 1801 painting Napoleon at the Saint-Bernard Pass by Jacques-Louis David on the cover. OSG created two more games in the series, Battles of the Hundred Days and Napoleon at Leipzig, both designed by Zucker and published in 1979.

In 2000, OSG revised and republished Bonaparte in Italy, retitling it Bonaparte in Italy: The Defense of Mantua & the Quadrilateral, July 29, 1796–January 30, 1797.

== Reception ==
In Issue 48 of the British wargaming magazine Perfidious Albion, Charles Vasey commented "Now this is a rather good game, and rather good history as well. You get some of the sense of the period as you manoeuvre trying to arrive at a mutually supporting set of positions." Vasey felt the game really shone in the area of supply, noting, "Where this game goes further is in its illustration of the worries of attrition. One is no longer quite so able to utter tedious platitudes about marching to attack at full speed, when to do so could lose you thousands (yes thousands) of your troops." Vasey also warned that the scenarios as presented are historical "and that means they are not balanced." Vasey concluded, "Even with that this ia a game that repays thought — the best [traditional Napoleonic] game I have played in a twelvemonth."

In Issue 52 of Moves, Ian Chadwick admired the components, calling them "superb; the maps are almost excruciatingly pretty, using a gradual change of colour from beige ("bottomland") to dark green (mountain) to suggest different elevations." Chadwick found the game "easy to assimilate for those who have played either Arcola ... or Napoleon at Bay." Chadwick concluded by giving this games grades of "A" for playability, historical accuracy and component quality, saying, "This is, as we have come to expect from OSG, a fine game. It is especially enjoyable to see a game dealing with a particular area of history left relatively untouched by the wargaming industry. Recommended highly."

== Other reviews and commentary ==
- Strategy & Tactics #32
- Fire & Movement #24 and #34
- Paper Wars #8 and #38
