= Saipan: Conquest of the Marianas =

World War II board wargame published in 1975

Cover of folio edition, 1975

Saipan: Conquest of the Marianas, June 1944 is a board wargame published by Simulations Publications Inc. (SPI) in 1975 that simulates the Battle of Saipan during World War II. Saipan was originally published as one of four games in the popular collection Island War: Four Pacific Battles, but was also released as an individual game.

== Background ==
In 1943 and early 1944, the United States turned the tide in the war against Japan with notable victories in the Solomon Islands, the Gilbert Islands, the Marshall Islands and Papua New Guinea. Now the United States set its sights on the Japanese-occupied island of Saipan, where the airbase could be used by their Boeing B-29 Superfortress bombers to attack the Japanese mainland. Japan considered Saipan to be part of its last line of defenses for the Japanese homeland, and had built coastal artillery batteries, shore defenses, and underground fortifications garrisoned by 30,000 soldiers. On 5 June 1944, the day the D-Day invasion in Europe was scheduled to begin — it was delayed by one day due to inclement weather — an American invasion fleet left Pearl Harbor. The attack on Saipan began nine days later.

== Description ==
Saipan is a two-player board wargame where one player controls the American forces, and the other the Japanese forces. Having a small 17" x 22" hex grid map, basic rules and only 100 counters, this game is relatively short and simple.

=== Gameplay ===
The rules for all four games in the Island War collection are based on the system developed for Napoleon at Waterloo published by SPI in 1971, which uses a simple "I Go, You Go" system of alternating player turns:

- The American player moves all units desired, and engages in combat.
- The Japanese player then has the same opportunity.

This completes one game turn, which represents 2 days of game time. Saipan lasts 15 turns.

In addition, stacking of units is prohibited, and there are no supply rules. Zones of control are both "rigid" and "sticky": a unit moving adjacent to an enemy unit must stop there. Combat is mandatory, and units thus engaged cannot move away from each other except as a result of combat.

In addition, each game in the Island War collection had a number of special rules. In Saipan, the special rules included:

- the Americans can hold up to six beachheads. All American reinforcements arrive through these beachheads, at the rate of one unit per beachhead held each turn.
- The Japanese are allowed to make suicidal "banzai charges", which are especially useful during the opening turns, when American forces are confined to narrow beachheads, and reinforcements can't arrive due to a lack of free space on the beaches. Critic Nick Palmer noted that the Japanese player's only hope of victory is to attack the beachheads: "Destroy five of the six beachheads and the Japanese are in with a chance."

Saipan comes with two scenarios: the "historical" setup, where units are placed on the map or enter the map according to the actual battle; and "free placement", where both players are able to set up their forces as they wish.

The victory conditions for Saipan are simple: The player that eliminates all enemy units from the board is the winner.

== Publication history ==
In 1975, SPI published the "quadrigame" Blue and Gray, which contained four different American Civil War games and one set of rules in the same box. The concept proved popular, and SPI quickly produced more. Island War, designed by Kevin Zucker and Jay Nelson, with cartography and graphic design by Redmond A. Simonsen, was published later in 1975. One of the four games in the box was Saipan, which was also released as an individual "folio game", packaged in a cardstock double LP-sized folder.

== Reception ==
In a 1976 poll conducted by SPI to determine the most popular board wargames in North America, Saipan placed 80th out of 202 games.

In the inaugural issue of the British magazine The Wargamer, editor Keith Poulter found the game unbalanced in favor of the Americans, saying, "It can be a lively game, and is quite good played solo. It is usually spoilt, however, by the inevitability of the result."

In the 1977 book The Comprehensive Guide to Board Wargaming, Marcus Watney called this game a "tense battle for the Island; each side must wipe out the other to win." Watney thought the game was not historically accurate and essentially unbalanced in favor of the Americans, but concluded, "Historically inaccurate and hard for Japanese to do better than draw, but exciting and often cliff-hanging to the end."

In the 1980 The Best of Board Wargaming , Nick Palmer commented "To my mind, this is the nicest of the four games [in Island War], perhaps because play can take place across the whole island." Palmer concluded by giving the game an Excitement grade of 70%, saying "Sadly I have never seen a Japanese victory myself, so tend to count a draw as a Japanese moral victory. It is still a very good game."

In The Guide to Simulations/Games for Education and Training, Martin Campion noted that "Artillery functions in the game quite different from other units. It is particularly flexible and therefore important." He also liked the rule allowing for Japanese banzai attacks, saying that it gave the game "A significant flavor."

== Reviews ==
- Fire & Movement #71
