= Wavre: The Lost Opportunity =

Napoleonic board wargame published in 1976

Cover of SPI folio edition, 1976

Wavre: The Lost Opportunity is a board wargame published by Simulations Publications Inc. (SPI) in 1976 that simulates the Battle of Wavre. Wavre was originally published as one of four games in the popular collection Napoleon's Last Battles, but was also released as an individual game.

== Background ==
On 16 June 1815, Napoleon had achieved a tactical victory over the Prussian army at the Battle of Ligny, but had allowed the Prussians to retreat in good order. Now Napoleon turned his attention to the Anglo-Allied army of the Duke of Wellington, gathered near the Belgian town of Waterloo. Napoleon was confident that he had the forces necessary to defeat the British as long as the Prussians were not allowed to reorganize and join forces with Wellington. In order to prevent this, Napoleon ordered Marshal Grouchy and a force of 33,000 men to pursue the retreating Prussians and attack them. However, Grouchy did not follow up on these orders promptly, allowing the Prussians to consolidate near the village of Wavre before Grouchy's forces arrived. At Waterloo, Wellington's forces could only hold on against a furious French assault and hope that the Prussians could escape from Wavre and march to Waterloo in time to aid Wellington.

== Description ==
Wavre is a two-player board wargame where one player controls the Prussian forces, and the other the French forces. Having a small 17" x 22" hex grid map, basic rules and only 100 counters, this game is relatively short and simple, where "players can usually discern the winner in one evening." Both sides gain victory points for eliminating enemy units and for exiting units off the western edge of the map (in order to join their respective sides at Waterloo.) In addition, the French gain points for any Prussian units left on the board at the end of the game. The game lasts only eight turns.

As critic Nicky Palmer noted, "If both sides move off the map the French will win. If [Prussian commander] Blücher stays put the French will win. The trick is to find precisely the right rate of withdrawal, and though the Prussians control the course of battle by their decision to pull back, it is probably slightly harder for them to carry the day."

=== Gameplay ===
The rules are based on the system developed for Napoleon at Waterloo published by SPI in 1971, which uses a simple "I Go, You Go" system of alternating player turns:

- The French player moves all units desired, and engages in combat.
- The Allied player then has the same opportunity.

This completes one game turn, which represents 1 hour of game time. In addition, stacking of units is prohibited, and there are no supply rules. Zones of control are both "rigid" and "sticky": a unit moving adjacent to an enemy unit must stop there. Combat is mandatory, and units thus engaged cannot move away from each other except as a result of combat.

== Publication history ==
In 1975, SPI published the "quadrigame" Blue and Gray, which contained four different American Civil War games and one set of rules in the same box. The concept proved popular, and SPI quickly produced more. Napoleon's Last Battles, designed by Kevin Zucker and Jay Nelson, with cartography and graphic design by Redmond A. Simonsen, was published the following year and proved to be one of SPI's most popular quadrigames. One of the four games in the box was Wavre, which was also released as an individual "folio game", packaged in a cardstock double LP-sized folder.

In 1979, the Belgian company EDI-AR published a Flemish/French version of Wavre and the other three games of Napoleon's Last Battles.

After TSR took over SPI in 1982, they attempted to get a quick return on their money by republishing several popular SPI titles such Wavre, which reappeared within a new edition of Napoleon's Last Battles.

In the 1990s, Decision Games acquired the rights to Wavre and the other games in the original Napoleon's Last Battles collection, and republished all four games with revised and streamlined rules and new components. Decision also included a new "historic" scenario for Wavre.

== Reception ==
In Issue 14 of the British magazine Perfidious Albion, Steve Clifford commented "Grouchy's culpability is clearly demonstrated by a French player willing to attack with determination. The Prussians have a strong position on the River Dyle, but many of the units they use are at reduced strength and can be pulled back.""

In his 1977 book The Comprehensive Guide to Board Wargaming, Nicholas Palmer called this game "One of the best 'puzzles' in wargaming, with many different theories on the correct withdrawal strategy." In his 1980 sequel, The Best of Board Wargaming , Palmer called the game "a fascinating problem, one of the most finely balanced in wargaming." Palmer concluded by giving the game an Excitement grade of 80%.

In Issue 3 of the French games magazine Casus Belli, Jean-Jacques Petit noted that it was hard to maintain the historicity of this battle because the French player knows exactly where the Prussian units will emerge, and when. Petit suggested using hidden movement to help with the balance of this game."

In Issue 53 of Moves, Ian Chadwick noted "For the French, the goal is twofold: exit units and delay the Prussians from doing so. The Prussians must establish a strong delaying force and rush everything else off the map, choosing to exit the remaining defenders only at the last minute." List concluded, "There's a lot of tense excitement in this game as both sides struggle to leave from the same area and prevent the other from doing so at the same time. It's short, fast, and furious. A good game."

In Issue 8 of Zone of Control, Monte Gray reviewed the Decision Games edition and found some issues with the map, pointing out that hex 0914 contained "three bridges" but was missing the town of Limelette. Despite this minor omission, he found the game to be "a lot of fun" and declared "the design has stood the test of time!"

In a retrospective review in Warning Order, Matt Irsik called the game "pretty interesting" and noted that "The mandatory attack rules did a good job of portraying operational level combat from that era and the end result was pretty satisfying."

== Other reviews and commentary ==
- Strategy & Tactics #103
- Fire & Movement #6, #24, and Special Issue #1
- The Wargamer Vol. 1, #4
- Paper Wars #26
