= Okinawa: The Last Battle =

1975 World War II board wargame

Cover of folio edition, 1975

Okinawa: The Last Battle, April 1945 is a board wargame published by Simulations Publications Inc. (SPI) in 1975 that simulates the Battle of Okinawa during World War II. Okinawa was originally published as one of four games in the popular collection Island War: Four Pacific Battles, but was also released as an individual game.

== Background ==
During 1943–1944, the Americans had continually forced the Japanese to retreat. In Spring 1945, Okinawa was considered a vital target by the Americans — they needed its deep water harbors and airstrips as the final stepping stone to an invasion of the Japanese homeland.

== Description ==
Okinawa is a two-player board wargame where one player controls the American forces, and the other the Japanese forces. Having a small 17" x 22" hex grid map, basic rules and only 100 counters, this game is relatively simple, although at 80 turns, it is unusually long compared to the other games in the Island War box. Unlike the other games in the Island War box, Okinawa does not involve amphibious landings — the Americans have already landed and established beachheads at the start of the game.

=== Gameplay ===
The rules are based on the system developed for Napoleon at Waterloo published by SPI in 1971, which uses a simple "I Go, You Go" system of alternating player turns:

- The American player moves all units desired, and engages in combat.
- The Japanese player then has the same opportunity.

This completes one game turn, which represents 1 day of game time.

In addition, stacking of units is prohibited, and there are no supply rules. Zones of control are both "rigid" and "sticky": a unit moving adjacent to an enemy unit must stop there. Combat is mandatory, and units thus engaged cannot move away from each other except as a result of combat.

In addition, each game in the Island War collection had a number of special rules. In Okinawa, the Japanese are allowed to make suicidal "banzai charges". The Americans cannot use barrage attacks, simulating the ineffectiveness of American artillery during this battle.

Okinawa comes with four scenarios that simulate various parts of the battle. These can be linked together as an 80-turn campaign game.

== Publication history ==
In 1975, SPI published the "quadrigame" Blue and Gray, which contained four different American Civil War games and one set of rules in the same box. The concept proved popular, and SPI quickly produced more. Island War, designed by Kevin Zucker and Jay Nelson, with cartography and graphic design by Redmond A. Simonsen, was published later in 1975. One of the four games in the box was Okinawa, which was also released as an individual "folio game", packaged in a cardstock double LP-sized folder.

== Reception ==
In a 1976 poll conducted by SPI to determine the most popular board wargames in North America, Okinawa placed 80th out of 202 games.

In the 1980 book The Best of Board Wargaming , Marcus Watney commented "This isn't really an island game at all. The Americans are already ashore and pressing the Japanese hard." Watney felt that the game lacked mobility, noting, "A dangerously static game is saved by the ability of both sides to land behind the other's lines." Watney concluded by giving the game an Excitement grade of only 20%, saying "Hardly an interesting game unless you love slugfests. Personally, I would have preferred to see a game on Iwo Jima."

In The Guide to Simulations/Games for Education and Training, Martin Campion noted that "Artillery functions in the game quite different from other units. It is particularly flexible and therefore important." He also liked the rule allowing for Japanese Banzai attacks, saying that it gave the game "a significant flavor."

== Reviews ==
- Fire & Movement #71
