= Dark December =

Dark December may refer to:

- Dark December The Full Account of the Battle of the Bulge, a 1947 history book by American Robert E. Merriam
- "Dark December" (Playhouse 90), an episode of American TV series Playhouse 90 based on Merriam's book
- Dark December (novel), a 1960 post-holocaust novel by American Alfred Coppel
- Dark December (game), a 1979 board wargame published by Operational Studies Group
