= La Belle Alliance: The Battle of Waterloo =

Board wargame

Cover of foilo edition, 1976

La Belle Alliance: The Battle of Waterloo is a board wargame published by Simulations Publications Inc. (SPI) in 1976 that simulates the Battle of Waterloo in 1815. It was one of four games that were published as part of the "quadrigame" (four games with a single set of rules) titled Napoleon's Last Battles, but was also released as an individual "folio game", packaged in a shrinkwrapped cardboard folio.

== Background ==
In the spring of 1815, with the return of Napoleon from exile on Elba, the rest of Europe hastily mobilized the armies of the Seventh Coalition. However, they had not yet had time to join forces when Napoleon and his reconstituted army marched out of Paris. Napoleon strove to forge a path north to Brussels in order to drive a wedge between the various armies of the Seventh Coalition, which would give him an opportunity to destroy each of them individually. All that stood between Napoleon and Brussels was an Anglo-Allied force under the command of the Duke of Wellington. On 18 June 1815 near the Belgian town of Waterloo, Napoleon arrayed his forces around a farm named "La Belle Alliance", and ordered his numerically superior army to attack Wellington's forces, hoping to destroy Wellington's army before a Prussian army under Field Marshal von Blücher could arrive. Wellington knew he had to hold off the French attack in the hope that von Blücher would arrive in time.

== Description ==
La Belle Alliance is a two-player wargame in which one player takes the role of Napoleon, and the other controls the Anglo-Prussian Alliance forces. It is a simple and easy-to-learn game, with only 100 counters, a relatively small 17" x 22" paper hex grid map, and two rules sheets.

=== Gameplay ===
The game uses a simple "I Go, You Go" system of alternating player turns taken from SPI's popular Napoleon at Waterloo game published in 1971:

- The French player moves all units desired and engages in combat.
- The Alliance player then has the same opportunity.

This completes one game turn, which represents 1 hour of daylight. There are only eight turns in the game. (Note: owing to the overnight rain Napoleon was unable to begin his attacks until early afternoon when the ground had dried)

== Publication history ==
After the success of SPI's first quadrigame, Blue & Gray: Four American Civil War Battles, published in May 1975, the company quickly produced several more quadrigames, including Napoleon's Last Battles. One of the four games included was La Belle Alliance, designed by Jay Nelson and Kevin Zucker. Napoleon's Last Battles debuted strongly, moving to #5 in SPI's Top Ten Games list the month it was published, but quickly fell off SPI's chart after a few weeks.

La Belle Alliance was also offered for individual sale as a "folio game" packaged in a cardstock folio.

After the demise of SPI, TSR republished La Belle Alliance in 1982 as part of a reprint of Napoleon's Last Battles. In 1995, Decision Games acquired the rights and published a revised edition with larger maps. Decision published a new edition in 2015.

== Reception ==
In Issue 14 of the British magazine Perfidious Albion, Steve Clifford noted that because of the peculiarities of the Combat Results Table and the specific Chateau rules, "the chateaux [are] far more significant features that in Napoleon at War."

In the 1977 book The Comprehensive Guide to Board Wargaming, Nick Palmer found that "Numerous units are crowded into a small area, and the game is much less interesting than [the other games in the Napoleon's Last Battles box]." In his 1980 sequel, The Best of Board Wargaming , Palmer added: "Unfortunately the need to fit the game into the campaign scale has forced a mass of units into a small segment of the map, so one gets a rather boring pitched battle with little room for manoevre." He concluded by giving the game a very low Excitement grade of only 25%.

In the 1980 book The Complete Book of Wargames, game designer Jon Freeman reviewed Napoleon's Last Battles and agreed that the map was just too small to allow any maneuvering, calling the game "a set-piece affair in which the object is to wear the enemy down to his demoralization level, a not particularly fascinating prospect." He concluded by giving the game an Overall Evaluation of "Good", saying, "the scale is wrong for a game of the Waterloo campaign."

In Issue 3 of the French games magazine Casus Belli, Jean-Jacques Petit found the game fatally unbalanced in favor of the French because, unlike Napoleon, the French player knows that Grouchy will not be arriving, and can throw the French reserves into the battle immediately.

In Issue 53 of Moves, Ian Chadwick called La Belle Alliance "A good tight game, one with plenty of excitement and action. For the entire eight turns, the game is alive with combat and movement as both sides try to force the issue." He gave the game grades of A for both Playability and Historical Accuracy.

In another retrospective review written over thirty years after publication of the game, Matt Irsik noted that La Belle Alliance was "pretty interesting and very different from all of the others. The mandatory attack rules did a good job of portraying operational level combat from that era and the end result was pretty satisfying."

== Other reviews and commentary ==
- Fire & Movement #6 & #24
- The Wargamer Vol.1 #4
- Panzerfaust #78
- Battleplan #2
- Paper Wars #26
- Line of Departure #13
- Simulacrum #20
