= Ligny: Incomplete Victory =

Napoleonic board wargame published in 1976

Cover of SPI folio edition, 1976

Ligny: Incomplete Victory is a board wargame published by Simulations Publications Inc. (SPI) in 1976 that simulates the Battle of Ligny. Ligny was originally published as one of four games in the popular collection Napoleon's Last Battles, but was also released as an individual game.

== Background ==
In June 1815, Napoleon returned to Paris from exile on Elba, and was declared an outlaw by the Sixth Coalition. As the Coalition armies began to gather in Belgium for a march on Paris, Napoleon realized he had to strike before his opposition could join forces, and determined to split the Prussians and the Anglo-Allied armies apart and defeat them individually. On 15 June 1815, Napoleon's forces attacked the Prussian army under Gebhard von Blücher before it was able to link up with the Anglo-Allies under the Duke of Wellington. The Prussians, although much weaker than the French, had enough time to take up strong defensive positions near the village of Ligny. In the end, although Napoleon managed to procure a tactical victory over the Prussians, von Blücher's forces retreated in good order and were able to play a vital role in the defeat of Napoleon at the Battle of Waterloo two days later.

== Description ==
Ligny is a two-player board wargame where one player controls the Prussian forces, and the other the French forces. Having a small 17" x 22" hex grid map, basic rules and only 100 counters, this game is relatively short and simple, where "players can usually discern the winner in one evening." The game lasts only eight turns.

=== Gameplay ===
The rules are based on the system developed for Napoleon at Waterloo published by SPI in 1971, which uses a simple "I Go, You Go" system of alternating player turns:

- The French player moves all units desired, and engages in combat.
- The Allied player then has the same opportunity.

This completes one game turn, which represents 1 hour of game time. In addition, stacking of units is prohibited, and there are no supply rules. Zones of control are both "rigid" and "sticky": a unit moving adjacent to an enemy unit must stop there. Combat is mandatory, and units thus engaged cannot move away from each other except as a result of combat.

== Publication history ==
In 1975, SPI published the "quadrigame" Blue and Gray, which contained four different American Civil War games and one set of rules in the same box. The concept proved popular, and SPI quickly produced more. Napoleon's Last Battles, designed by Kevin Zucker and Jay Nelson, with cartography and graphic design by Redmond A. Simonsen, was published the following year and proved to be one of SPI's most popular quadrigames. One of the four games in the box was Ligny, which was also released as an individual "folio game", packaged in a cardstock double LP-sized folder.

After TSR took over SPI in 1982, they attempted to get a quick return on their money by republishing several popular SPI titles such Ligny, which reappeared within a new edition of Napoleon's Last Battles.

In the 1990s, Decision Games acquired the rights to Ligny and the other games in the original Napoleon's Last Battles collection, and republished all four games with revised and streamlined rules and new components.

== Reception ==
In Issue 14 of the British magazine Perfidious Albion, Steve Clifford thought this was "a fairly ordinary battle game between two large armies set up in strong positions."

In his 1977 book The Comprehensive Guide to Board Wargaming, Nicholas Palmer warned that this game was "Potentially fairly long, unless the Prussian defence breaks quickly against Napoleon's set-piece assault." Palmer concluded that Ligny involved "Tough fighting, with poor Prussian morale and French strength balanced by the powerful defensive positions." In his 1980 sequel, The Best of Board Wargaming , Palmer called Ligny "a little more interesting [than two of the other games in the box] though a little immobile. The numerically superior French storm an easily-demoralized Prussian line in an excellent defensive position." Palmer concluded by giving the game an Excitement grade of 75%, saying, "Imprecise play can lead to a rout for either side, but the game is not unbalanced and the best strategy for attack is not clear."

In the 1980 book The Complete Book of Wargames, game designer Jon Freeman called Ligny "a set-piece affair in which the object is to wear the enemy down to his demoralization level, a not particularly fascinating prospect." Freeman gave this game an Overall Evaluation of "Good."

In Issue 3 of the French games magazine Casus Belli, Jeran-Jacques Petit commented, "This is the most balanced battle of the separate games ... Luck will play a very big role, but contrary to first impressions, the final result will depend largely on the behavior of the 3rd Prussian corps."

In Issue 53 of Moves, Ian Chadwick called Ligny "a game for those who enjoy pounding, ponderous armies and slow advances." List noted that limitation on the map size prevented the French from attempting a flanking maneuver, and concluded, "The board limits are my only complaint about this game, which like the rest of the quad, is excellent gaming quality."

In Issue 8 of Zone of Control, Monte Gray reviewed the Decision Games edition and found some difficulties with reading the counters due to the colors chosen. For example, the French Imperial Guard feature black text on a deep purple background. Gray also noted that Ligny was a lot more balanced when the leadership rules from the campaign game were used. "Now those Prussian defenses around Ligny seem much stronger, especially when handled by a good defensive player — like the one who always seems to be opposite me when I play Napoleon!"

== Other reviews and commentary ==
- Strategy & Tactics #103
- Fire & Movement #6, #24, and Special Issue #1
- The Wargamer Vol. 1, #4
- Paper Wars #26
- Simalcrum #20
