= Island War: Four Pacific Battles =

1975 collection of four World War II board wargames

Island War: Four Pacific Battles is a collection of four board wargames published in 1975 by Simulations Publications Inc. (SPI) that simulates various battles between American and Japanese forces during the Pacific Campaign of World War II.

== Description ==
Island War is a "quadrigame", four thematically connected games that use the same basic rules. The four games in the box are:

- Bloody Ridge: Turning Point on Guadalcanal: The Guadalcanal campaign, the first major American offensive in the Pacific. (Designed by Kevin Zucker)
- Saipan: Conquest of the Marianas, June 1944: The Battle of Saipan. (Designed by Kip Allen)
- Leyte: Return to the Philippines: The return of General MacArthur. (Designed by Jay Nelson)
- Okinawa: The Last Battle, April 1945: The Battle of Okinawa. (Designed by Larry Pinsky)

Each game has includes two to five scenarios.

=== Components ===
The game box includes:

- four 22" x 17" paper hex grid maps, one for each game
- four sheets of die-cut counters (Bloody Ridge: 65 counters; Leyte: 100 counters; Okinawa: 98 counters; Saipan: 77 counters)
- rulebook: Rules common to all four games. A special rule allows for Japanese Banzai charges.
- four rule sheets: rules unique to each game

== Publication history ==
After the success of SPI's first quadrigame, Blue & Gray, in May 1975, the company quickly produced more quadrigames over the next six months, including Blue & Gray II, Napoleon at War, and Modern Battles. The last to appear in 1975 was Island War, which debuted strongly, moving to #2 in SPI's Top Ten Games list the month it was published. But that initial flush of success was temporary and Island War fell off the Top Ten list after six months. In a 1976 poll conducted by SPI to determine the most popular wargames in North America, Island War was SPI's lowest-placed quadrigame in the poll, ranking only 93rd of 202 games. (In contrast, Blue & Gray and Napoleon at War tied for 23rd, and Modern Battles placed 33rd.)

Each of the games in Island War were offered for individual sale as well, but none sold well enough to crack SPI's Top Ten list.

After the demise of SPI, Sunset Games (サンセットゲ) acquired the game license and published a Japanese language edition titled 孤島の戦場 (Battlefield on an Isolated Island).

== Reception ==
In Issue 3 of Perfidious Albion, George Barnard commented, "The present games are maybe the most interesting of the [SPI quadrigames] so far ... while some of the games may be prone to turn into slugging matches, the infiltration rules and the artillery tends to liven things up."

In Issue 12 of Fire & Movement, Friedrich Helfferich noted, "The Island War quad is based on a rather conventional system with fixed active zones of control and standard terrain effects." Helfferich concluded, "The game system is easy to learn and quite effective. The games themselves are of uneven quality."

In the 1977 book The Comprehensive Guide to Board Wargaming, contributor Marcus Watney thought all the games were "notable for realistic artillery rules" but overall called this collection of games "a very mixed bag" as he reviewed the individual games:

- Bloody Ridge: "a fast-moving and clean-cut game [...] Well-balanced: the Japaneses have the onus of the offensive, but a tactical edge with an ability to infiltrate and disengage."
- Leyte: "Slow, ponderous, and predictable."
- Okinawa: "a massive sixty turns, unusual in a Quad game."
- Saipan: "Tense battle for the island; each side must wipe out the other to win [...] Historically inaccurate and hard for Japanese to do better than draw, but exciting and often cliff-hanging to the end."

In his 1980 book The Best of Board Wargaming, Nicholas Palmer theorized that the low popularity of this quadrigame was "perhaps due to the rather one-sided nature of the fighting in the Pacific after Guadalcanal." Palmer had mixed emotions about the four games.

- Bloody Ridge: "In this game the Japanese actually have a real chance to win more than just a moral victory [...] The second scenario is much bloodier [than the first] but, as it does not require the same degree of tactical subtlety, is rather less exciting." (Excitement grade: 50%)
- Saipan: "The nicest of the four games, perhaps because play can take place across the entire island [...] Sadly, I have never seen a Japanese victory myself, so tend to count a draw as a Japanese moral victory. It is still a very good game." (Excitement grade: 70%)
- Leyte: ""This is a very odd game indeed. The three scenarios are all very different, and yet none of them are really very entertaining." (Excitement grade: 30%)
- Okinawa: "A dangerously static game is saved by the ability of both sides to land behind the other's lines [...] Hardly an interesting game unless you love slugfests." (Excitement grade: 20%)

Bruce Quarrie, writing for Airfix Magazine, allowed that SPI's quadrigames use "a basic game system simple enough to cover centuries of warfare with only minor concessions to the arms and tactics of different ages." But Quarrie found Island War to be too simplistic, only giving the players "a vague impression of the nature of the forces in conflict and the difficulties or benefits of the terrain they fought over. It cannot in its present form, show the distinctions between infantry, artillery and cavalry or armour, nor their inter-relation on the battlefield." Quarrie suggest that "a few simple optional rules [...] would add a lot to the games both in terms of realism and enjoyment." Comparing the four games, Quarrie thought that "They are all much the same with slight differences to allow for particular aspects of the battles."

In Issue 71 of Fire & Movement, Joe Miranda commented, "While not the final word on these battles, Island War was fairly simple and easy to play — as intended."

In The Guide to Simulations/Games for Education and Training, Martin Campion noted that "Artillery functions in the game quite different from other units. It is particularly flexible and therefore important." He also liked the rule allowing for Japanese Banzai attacks, saying that it gave the game, "A significant flavor."

In a retrospective review in Issue 20 of Simulacrum, Peter Bartlett noted "Small maps and low counter density make for a quick and easy setup, even in a limited space. These are games that can easily be set up, played, and put away in one evening after the dishes are done and the kids are put to bed. For those who are hard pressed to find a face-to-face opponent, as I am, these games are highly suited to solitaire play." Bartlett concluded, "Island War falls solidly on the game end of the game-simulation spectrum. But sometimes it’s okay for a game to just be a game. All four games are clean, simple games, and don’t need a lot of deep thought to enjoy."

== Other reviews and commentary ==
- Strategy & Tactics #52
- The Wargamer Vol.1 #1
- Outposts #8
- Strategist #185
