= Napoleon at Leipzig =

Napoleonic board wargame

- 1st edition box cover featuring art by Felician Myrbach
- Designers: Kevin Zucker
- Illustrators: Rick Barber; Larry Catalano; Louis Dumoulin; Charles Kibler; Ted Koller; Felician Myrbach
- Publishers: Operational Studies Group
- Publication: 1979
- Genres: Napoleonic

Napoleon at Leipzig is a board wargame published by Operational Studies Group (OSG) in 1979 that simulates the Battle of Leipzig.

== Background ==
Following Napoleon's disastrous campaign in Russia during 1812 that destroyed his Grande Armée, the European powers opposing him (the Sixth Coalition) felt that the time was ripe to move against France. Napoleon, in an attempt to counter the Coalition with a rapid and decisive strike before they could effectively gather their forces, quickly rebuilt a new army from reservists, draft evaders and youth and marched them into the German states in the spring of 1813. Near the city of Leipzig, Napoleon's army of 200,000 clashed with a Coalition army of over 300,000.

== Description ==
Napoleon at Leipzig is a two-player wargame where one player controls French forces, and the other player controls Coalition forces.

=== Components ===
First edition:

- two 22" x 34" 6-color mapsheets
- 400 counters, including 90 blanks
- an 8-page rulebook
- various player aids

Fourth edition:

- Two 32" x 24" maps
- 380 counters
- 20-page rulebook
- 32-page study folder

Fifth edition:

- three maps (two 22" x 34", one 17" x 22")
- 560 counters
- a 22-page rulebook
- various player aids
- 100 random event cards

=== Gameplay ===
The game system uses an "I Go, You Go", alternating series of turns, where one player moves and attacks, followed by the other player. Players have a choice, in order of increasing complexity, of Basic rules, Campaign rules and Grand Tactical rules. Under the Campaign rules, Army Commanders use Officers (i.e. corps commanders) to transmit orders to move and fight to the units. Without an Officer within suitable distance, a unit will not attack, and can only move to get closer to the Officer.

The first two layers of rules are similar to those of Napoleon's Last Battles, but using the “grand tactical” rules, leaders are rated for initiative (similar to the mechanism in War Between The States). The French general Michel Ney is more competent on retreat but may command only one corps in attack, whereas Joachim Murat can command two corps (or four cavalry corps) in attack. The Allies have only weak central control of their three armies, and Blücher is much more likely to attack than Schwarzenberg. For the French, Napoleon issues a general order every four hours: general offensive, local offensive (by one Officer and his units), consolidation (no unit may enter into enemy zone of control), desperate defence (defending units must take losses rather than retreat), tactical withdrawal (moving units fall back on Leipzig) or general withdrawal (no entry to enemy zone of control allowed unless blocking the way).

Other rules allow units in reserve to move free of command restrictions behind friendly lines, for cavalry to conduct charges, either overrunning the enemy position or being themselves eliminated, and for a token attack with experimental Congreve rockets by the British Rocket Troop attached to Bernadotte's army.

=== Strategy ===
Critic Marc Brandsma noted, "The task is no easy one for the French player, who must maintain enough maneuvering room around Leipzig to potentially execute a rapid withdrawal from the right bank of the Elster, all while trying to wear down the Coalition forces." On the other side of struggle, Brandsma suggested the Coalition player "faces their own command challenges and must strike with subtlety and precision."

=== Scenarios ===
There are four scenarios included:

1. An advance clash of cavalries on 14 October 1813 at Liebertwolkwitz.
2. The two skirmishes of 16 October:
  1. Moeckern
  2. Wachau
3. The 40-turn campaign game, which combines Moeckern and Wachau with the decisive battle of 18 October.

== Publication history ==
Napoleon at Leipzig was designed by Kevin Zucker, with interior artwork by Rick Barber, Larry Catalano, Louis Dumoulin, Charles Kibler, Ted Koller and cover art by Felician Myrbach, and was published by OSG in 1979. Clash of Arms (CoA) then bought the rights and published three editions, before OSG regained the rights and published the 5th edition in 2013. Counting all editions, over 20,000 copies have been sold.

== Reception ==
=== 1st edition (OSG) ===
In Issue 78 of Puzzles & Games, Nick Palmer thought that players who liked the simple SPI quadrigame Napoleon's Last Battles "will love this game." However, Palmer noted "The trouble is that these pretty advanced leadership rules continue to build on a simple basic structure, and it one plays the full Grand Tactical Game, the effect is top-heavy." Palmer concluded by giving the game an above average Excitement rating of 4 out of 5, saying, "I suspect that Napoleon's Last Battles fans will not want to be bothered by all the extra rules." Palmer repeated his opinion in The Best of Board Wargaming: the extra layer of command rules "begins to overload the basic system … the game is a shade over-elaborate if all the rules are used".

In Issue 53 of Moves, Ian Chadwick didn't like the campaign game's Allied victory condition around the destruction of the Leipzig bridge, saying it did not reflect the actual battle. He also found many of the darker-colored counters difficult to read. But he concluded that overall "this is a good, playable game", and gave the game an "A" for playability, a "B" for historical accuracy, and a "C" for component quality.

In Issue 21 of Phoenix (September/October 1979), Doug Davies found the game components "physically rather disappointing" but in terms of simulation, playability and enjoyment, "it scores favourable marks." At the end of an in-depth examination of the game, he concluded, "All in all this is an excellent game which I would highly recommend. It succeeds in its prime objective of illustrating the command system of the Napoleonic era extremely effectively and does it in a style which makes it entertaining and enjoyable to play."

In the 1980 book The Complete Book of Wargames, game designer Jon Freeman called this "a stunningly beautiful game [...] everything is calculated to please the eye." He also noted the "excellent historical notes and a good order of battle." Freeman was less enthused about the new command control system, saying, "The added command features are interesting, but they do make things top-heavy in that department for what is otherwise a fairly simple system." He also noted issues with game balance, saying, "The French seem to do a bit too well. Whether this is caused by the system or design bias is difficult to determine, but it takes the edge off what is otherwise a very nice effort." Freeman concluded by giving the game an Overall Evaluation of "Good."

=== 2nd edition (CoA) ===
In Issue 56 of the French games magazine Casus Belli, Marc Brandsma noted "this edition retains the best of the original design while elevating it to the standards of the COA series." Brandsma liked the "simple game system allowing for a fluid, dynamic, and fast-paced tactical simulation." Brandsma concluded, "Ultimately, it is an excellent simulation that deserves a place in your collection."

=== 4th edition (CoA) ===
In Issue 8 of Zone of Control, Mike Szarka reviewed CoA's 4th edition and found the map and counters overly bright, saying, "I'd gladly give up some of the color-and-pageantry [on the counters] for greater ease-of-play ... the graphics are so busy that functionality takes a hit." Szarka found the setup time "slow and laborious", and found several errors in the set-ups as well. Szarka liked the rules, although they dated back more than 15 years, noting, "Because they've been out of style for so long, the mechanics seem as fresh as any chit-pulling, order-writing, or impuilse-oriented design we're likely to see any time soon." Szarka found the initial scenario covering the cavalry clash at Liebertwolkwitz had "little appeal due to the lack of strategic options." However, he found the two skirmish scenarios, Moeckern and Wachau, more interesting. Szarka thought the campaign game was too long, but admitted "Only by putting together both maps, and combining the Meckern and Wachau struggles, can one appreciate the enormity of the military problem facing the French [at the decisive battle]." Szarka concluded by giving the game grades of "Excellent" for gameplay and "Good" for historicity, saying, "This is a solid game on a majestic subject. Many will buy it because it looks good. Most will find it plays better than it looks."

=== 5th edition (OSG) ===
Retired Colonel Bill Gray reviewed the 5th edition for Wargamer, and his verdict was "Get the game." He even encouraged players who already owned a previous copy of the game to buy this edition: "The graphics are state of the art, the map is bigger for more maneuvers, the clash at Hanau is included as a bonus and the game system so radically updated as to nearly count as original." Gray admitted that although he collected wargames for research purposes, he rarely played them. "Napoleon at Leipzig is one game I will actually play, and play again." He concluded "As Russian Prince Pyotr Bagration said of the bold advance of the French 57th Ligne at Borodino, Bravo Messieurs, c'est superbe!"

== Awards ==
At the 1980 Origins Awards, Napoleon at Leipzig won the Charles S. Roberts Award for Best Pre-20th Century Game of 1979.

== Other reviews and commentary ==
=== 1st edition ===
- Fire & Movement #24
- International Wargamer Vol. 5 #2
- The Wargamer Vol. 1 #4
- Panzerfaust #63
- Battle Flag Vol. 1 #26

=== 5th edition ===
- Consimworld News/Board Game Geek
