= The Emperor Returns =

1986 board game

Cover art by 19th-century artist Vasily Sternberg

The Emperor Returns is a Napoleonic board wargame published in 1986 by Clash of Arms that asks "What if Napoleon had won the Battle of Waterloo?".

== Background ==
The Battle of Waterloo was a narrow victory for forces of the Seventh Coalition under General Arthur Wellesely, and if several small factors had changed — for example, if French Marshal Emmanuel de Grouchy had not pursued Prussian troops at nearby Wavre and had instead returned in time for the main battle — a French victory might have been very possible.

== Contents ==
The Emperor Returns is a two-player wargame in which one person controls French forces under Napoleon, and the other player controls armies of the Seventh Coalition under General Arthur Wellesely, and covers a hypothetical month-long campaign by Napoleon in Belgium following a fictional French victory at Waterloo.

Rules cover the movements and fighting of Napoleonic era armies, including features such as supply and attrition, morale, leadership, and military intelligence and administration.

Only army or corps leaders appear on the map, with subordinate units (corps, divisions, battalions, regiments) placed on graduated mark sheets. This means there are few pawns to maneuver, and this system also preserves secrecy about the forces present. In addition, both players can deploy decoys, raising uncertainty about the quality of soldiers in the engagement.

== Publication history ==
The Emperor Returns was designed by Kevin Zucker and was published by Clash of Arms in 1986. The box cover features the painting Napoleon Returning from Elba by 19th-century Russian painter Vasily Sternberg.

=== Victory conditions ===
Victory is not dependent on inflicting casualties but on degrading the morale of the opposing army. The player who brings the opposition's morale to the breaking point is the winner.

== Reception ==
In Issue 6 of the British games magazine Games International, Mike Siggins did not like the "what if?" aspect of the game, commenting, "On balance I cannot recommend this game to the people most likely to buy it; that is, enthusiastic Napoleonic gamers. Much of what the system offers is clever, deceptively atmospheric and it comes closer than many to its goal, but for those of you who want a true simulation the field is still wide open." Siggins concluded by giving this game a below average rating of only 2 out of 5.

In Issue 59 of the French games magazine Casus Belli, Mark Brandsma was enthusiastic about this game, noting that the use of decoys meant that "It's impossible to know what's in front of you before you start the fight. Nerve-wracking." Brandsma concluded, "This simulation is superb to play. With games lasting less than 5 hours, you will have plenty of time to explore the many possible variations. I'm going back to play another game right away."
