= Leyte: Return to the Philippines, October 1944 =

1975 World War II board wargame

Folio edition of the game, 1975

Leyte: Return to the Philippines, October 1944 is a board wargame published in 1975 by Simulations Publications Inc. (SPI) that simulates the return of General Douglas MacArthur to the Philippines during World War II. The game was originally published as part of the four-game collection Island War: Four Pacific Battles, but was also released as an individual game. Leyte was not considered an outstanding success by critics.

== Background ==
After American General Douglas MacArthur was forced out of the Philippines in early 1942 in the face of a Japanese invasion; he vowed, "I came through and I shall return." In October 1944, he made good on his promise when American forces landed on the Philippine island of Leyte, beginning a campaign to liberate all of the Philippines.

== Description ==
Leyte is a two-player wargame in which one player controls American forces trying to retake the Philippines, and the other controls the Japanese forces trying to prevent this. With a small 17" x 22" map and only 100 counters, this is not considered a complex game. The gameplay uses a simple "I Go, You Go" alternating sequence, where the American player moves and fires, followed by the Japanese player.

The game comes with three scenarios, each simulating a different part of the battle to retake the Philippines:

- Japanese retreat westward in the face of the American landing at Leyte
- Americans are slowed to a crawl by tenacious Japanese defense in the mountains (likened by critic Marcus Watney to "a re-enactment of the First World War.")
- American attack on final Japanese positions

== Publication history ==
After the success of SPI's first four-game collection Blue & Gray in May 1975, the company quickly produced more four-game collections over the next six months, including Island War, which appeared in December 1975. One of the games in the Island War box was Leyte, designed by Jay Nelson, with graphic design by Redmond A. Simonsen. All four of the games, including Leyte, were also offered for individual sale, packaged in cardstock folios.

After the demise of SPI, Sunset Games (サンセットゲ) acquired the game license and published a Japanese language edition of Leyte and the other three Island War games in 孤島の戦場 (Battlefield on an Isolated Island).

== Reception ==
In a 1976 poll conducted by SPI to determine the most popular wargames in North America, Leyte was ranked a poor 109th out of 202 games.

In the 1977 book The Comprehensive Guide to Board Wargaming, Marcus Watney called Leyte "Slow, ponderous, and predictable."

In his 1980 book The Best of Board Wargaming, Nick Palmer theorized that the low popularity of this game was "perhaps due to the rather one-sided nature of the fighting in the Pacific after Guadalcanal." He found Leyte "a very odd game indeed. The three scenarios are all very different, and yet none of them are really very entertaining." Palmer concluded by giving the game an Excitement Grade of only 30%.

Bruce Quarrie, writing for Airfix Magazine found the game to be too simplistic, only giving the players "a vague impression of the nature of the forces in conflict and the difficulties or benefits of the terrain they fought over. It cannot in its present form, show the distinctions between infantry, artillery and cavalry or armour, nor their inter-relation on the battlefield." Quarrie suggest that "a few simple optional rules [...] would add a lot to the games both in terms of realism and enjoyment."

In The Guide to Simulations/Games for Education and Training, Martin Campion noted that "Artillery functions in the game quite different from other units. It is particularly flexible and therefore important." He also liked the rule allowing for Japanese Banzai attacks, saying that it gave the game, "A significant flavor."

== Other reviews and commentary ==
- Strategy & Tactics #52
- Fire & Movement #12
- The Wargamer Vol.1 #1
- Outposts #8
- Strategist #185
- Simulacrum #20
