= The 20th Maine =

Board wargame

Cover of OSG edition, 1979

The 20th Maine, subtitled "The Battle for Little Round Top", is a board wargame published by Operational Studies Group (OSG) in 1979 that simulates the battle for possession of a hill called Little Round Top that anchored the left flank of the Union Army on the second day of the Battle of Gettysburg during the American Civil War. The game was republished by Avalon Hill in 1982 and titled Little Round Top.

== Background ==
On July 2, 1863, the second day of the pivotal Battle of Gettysburg, the Union army was arrayed along a ridge called Cemetery Hill. Suspecting an attack on his left was imminent, Union Army commander George Meade ordered Maj. Gen. Daniel Sickles to set up his III Corps on Little Round Top, a small hill at the left end of the Union army's position. But Sickles disobeyed Meade's order, and instead set up his Corps a few hundred yards west, in front of the Union line, leaving Little Round Top unoccupied. When Meade saw where Sickles had set up his Corps and realized his left flank was unguarded, he sent his chief engineer, Brigadier General Gouverneur K. Warren, to attempt to deal with the situation. Warren discovered Little Round Top completely undefended about the same time that a Confederate force, under orders from General Robert E. Lee to roll up the Union left flank, began to advance on the unguarded hill. Warren sent staff officers to bring any help they could find immediately. The first to respond was Col. Strong Vincent, who arrived with four regiments. He had ten minutes to set a defense before the Confederate force arrived. Holding Vincent's left flank – and the left flank of the entire Union Army – was the small 20th Maine Infantry Regiment, 385 men commanded by Col. Joshua Lawrence Chamberlain. Vincent's final orders to Chamberlain were to hold his position at all costs. For the next hour, the entire Battle of Gettysburg hung in the balance.

== Description ==
The 20th Maine is a two-player board wargame where one player controls the Union army, and the other the Confederate army. Although the game has a small 17" x 22" hex grid map scaled at 20 yds (18 m) per hex and only 100 counters, there are 12 pages of rules, making the game relatively complex.

=== Movement ===
Instead of using the then-standard movement factor, where each unit has a certain distance it can move each turn, The 20th Maine uses "command allowances" for each leader on the map, a pool of command points that the leader can spend on units to move, attack or engage in a variety of other actions:

- move forward or backward, or climb up or climb down the side of a hill
- climb over fences, stone walls, and boulders
- reform from a line to a column or vice versa
- remove units from or add units to a stack
- prepare to fire in a volley (which uses up ammunition faster)
- fix or remove bayonets
- hand-to-hand combat (melee)
- rally disorganized units

If a unit is not within command distance of a leader it cannot do any of the above actions.

=== Gameplay ===
The game uses a system of turns similar to SPI's Gettysburg wargame Terrible Swift Sword. The first player acts:

- Active player's Command phase: Rally units, determine which units are within command distance of a leader, and dispense command points to them
- Active player's Movement
- Non-active player's defensive fire
- Active player's Fire
- Active player's Melee

The second player then has the same opportunities, completing one Game Turn, which represents six minutes of combat. The game lasts 18 turns.

=== Victory conditions ===
Each player can accumulate Victory Points for inflicting casualties as well as holding certain hexes at the top of the hill at the end of the game.

== Publication history ==
In 1979, Leonard Millman designed The 20th Maine, which was published by OSG as part of their "Pocket Games" line, games packaged in a plastic pouch with a small map and only 100 counters. In 1982, Avalon Hill purchased the game and republished it as Little Round Top.

== Reception ==
In Issue 78 of Games & Puzzles, Nick Palmer reviewed the OSG edition and found the rules "unusually clear and well-organised [with] new ideas which could well be copied by bigger brothers." He found "The tactical problems quite absorbing, with the decision to fix bayonets particularly crucial since it rules out firing in favour of an edge in the attack during melee." Palmer concluded by giving The 20th Maine an above average Excitement rating of 4 out of 5, calling the game "A remarkable bargain."

In Issue 54 of Moves, Steve List liked the "command point" system but found some of the other rules to be idiosyncratic "such as units with fixed bayonets not being able to fire, and the firepower of units not being reduced by movement." Despite this, List concluded by giving the game an above-average grade of B+, calling it "a well-balanced and enjoyable game with an interesting variation on the almost standard [Terrible Swift Sword] system."

In Issue 58 of Fire & Movement, Bill Koff Liked the "superb aesthetics of the cover, birds-eye counters and map board (pink hills notwithstanding.)" However, Koff found the game too predictable, noting "the outcome of each contest [...] is rarely in much doubt." He did admit that he found joy "in watching the action unfold, rather than outsmarting your opponent."

== Other reviews and commentary ==
- The Grenadier No. 19
- Strategy & Tactics #79
