= Bloody Ridge (game) =

Board wargame

Cover of 1975 folio edition

Bloody Ridge, subtitled "Turning Point on Guadalcanal, September 1942", is a board wargame published by Simulations Publications Inc. (SPI) in 1975 that simulates the Guadalcanal Campaign during World War II. The game was originally published as part of the Island War: Four Pacific Battles "quadrigame" — a gamebox containing four games simulating four separate battles that all use the same rules. Bloody Ridge was also published as an individual "folio game."

== Background ==
In the Pacific campaign of World War II, following the attack on Pearl Harbor in December 1941, Japan had quickly attacked across a broad front. But following the Battle of Midway in June 1942, momentum swung from the Japanese to the Americans. Two months later, the Americans launched their first offensive action, an invasion of Guadalcanal in the South Solomon Islands, hoping to neutralize a major Japanese airbase under construction at Rabaul.

== Description ==
Bloody Ridge is a game for two players where one player controls the American invaders, and the other controls the Japanese defenders.

=== Components ===
The game box includes:

- 22" x 17" paper hex grid map
- 65 die-cut counters
- Island War rulebook: Rules common to all four games
- rule sheet with rules unique to Bloody Ridge

=== Gameplay ===
The game, like most quadrigames, uses a standard "I Go, You Go" alternating turn system, where one player moves and fires, then the other player does the same. This completes one game turn, which represents one week of game time. There are also special rules covering artillery fire, air-to-ground attacks, banzai charges, and the ability of Japanese units to infiltrate American positions.

=== Scenarios ===
There are three scenarios:

1. First Japanese land offensive (7 turns)
2. Second Japanese land offensive (7 turns)
3. Campaign game: a long 27-turn game that in part, includes Scenario 1 (Turns 1–7) and Scenario 2 (Turns 21–27).

=== Victory conditions ===
The victory conditions are the same for every scenario: The Japanese players wins if Japanese units occupy any two hexes of Henderson Field at the end of the last turn. The American player wins by preventing this.

== Publication history ==
After the success of SPI's first quadrigame, Blue & Gray, in May 1975, the company quickly produced more quadrigames over the next six months, including Blue & Gray II, Napoleon at War, and Modern Battles. The last to appear in 1975 was Island War, consisting of the four games Bloody Ridge, Saipan, Okinawa and Leyte. Bloody Ridge, designed by Kevin Zucker and with graphic design by Redmond A. Simonsen, was also offered for individual sale as a "folio game" — a game packaged in a cardstock folio. It did not crack SPI's Top Ten Bestseller list.

== Reception ==
In the 1977 book The Comprehensive Guide to Board Wargaming, contributor Marcus Watney called Bloody Ridge "a fast-moving and clean-cut game [that is] well-balanced: the Japanese have the onus of the offensive, but a tactical edge with an ability to infiltrate and disengage."

In the 1980 book The Complete Book of Wargames, game designer Jon Freeman called Bloody Ridge "probably the best of the Island War quad [...] both a reasonable simulation of history and a playable game." Freeman concluded by giving an Overall Evaluation of "Good."

In his 1980 book The Best of Board Wargaming, Nicholas Palmer noted that in three of the games in the Island Wars quadrigame, the games were heavily unbalanced in favor of the Americans. However, he thought that in Bloody Ridge "the Japanese actually have a real chance to win more than just a moral victory [...] The second scenario is much bloodier [than the first] but, as it does not require the same degree of tactical subtlety, is rather less exciting." Palmer concluded by giving Bloody Ridge an "Excitement grade" of 50%.

In the July 1976 issue of Airfix Magazine, Bruce Quarrie complained that Bloody Ridge lacked any customized rules that distinguished it from the other games in the Island War box. As such, he felt that all the games "are all much the same with slight differences to allow for particular aspects of the battle."

== Other reviews and commentary ==
- Strategy & Tactics #52
- Fire & Movement #12 & #71
- The Wargamer Vol.1 #1
- Outposts #8
- Strategist #185
