= Devil's Den (game) =

American Civil War wargame

- Cover of the OSG edition, 1980
- Designers: Leonard Millman; David Martin
- Publishers: OSG
- Publication: 1980
- Genres: American Civil War

Devil's Den, subtitled "Hood's Assault at Gettysburg", is a board wargame published by Operational Studies Group (OSG) in 1980 that simulates the fighting to control the key Devil's Den terrain feature during the 1863 Battle of Gettysburg during the American Civil War.

== Background ==
During the second day of the three-day battle of Gettysburg, Devil's Den, a strategic hill, proved to be a weak spot in the Union battle line, and was overrun by Confederate troops from Alabama, Texas and Arkansas after fierce fighting.

== Description ==
Devil's Den simulates the Confederate assault on the original Union position at Devil's Den.

=== Components ===
The game box contains:

- 22" x 34" paper hex grid map of the ground between Little Round Top and Big Round Top, scaled at 30 yards (27 m) per hex
- 520 die-cut counters
- rule book
- Study folder
- player aid charts
- two 6-sided dice

=== Gameplay ===
Each turn represents 8 minutes of game play. Four scenarios are presented, including the Confederate assault on Little Round Top and two "what if?" variants.

== Publication history ==
In 1979, Leonard Millman and David Martin created the American Civil War wargame The 20th Maine, which was published by OSG. The next year, Millman and Martin designed Devil's Den using many of the same rules; it was also published by OSG.

In 1985, Avalon Hill acquired the rights to the game, and revised the rules to include basic and advanced games. It was then republished with artwork by Charles Kibler and George I. Parrish, Jr.

== Reception ==
In Issue 54 of Moves, Steve List considered this a much more refined game than its predecessor, 20th Maine, but noted that "The game plays well, but slowly compared to 20th Maine because of the greater number of counters and markers in play. It is no worse in this respect than any of the [Terrible Swift Sword] family, though." List concluded by giving Devil's Den a grade of B+.
