= The Legend of Robin Hood (board game) =

Board game

Original OSG edition, cover art by Larry Catalona, 1979

The Legend of Robin Hood is a board game published by Operational Studies Group (OSG) in 1979, and later republished by Avalon Hill that is based on the legendary outlaw Robin Hood and his nemesis, the Sheriff of Nottingham.

== Description ==
The Legend of Robin Hood is a 2-player microgame set in Sherwood Forest and in the area around it. One player controls Robin Hood, who must recruit a loyal band of men to help him rob from the rich and give to the poor. The other player controls the Sheriff of Nottingham, who uses soldiers to attempt to guard travellers and capture Robin's men.

=== Components ===
The ziplock bag with cover art sheet contains:

- 6-page rulebook
- paper map of Sherwood Forest and environs, divided into various areas
- 117 die-cut counters (39 playing pieces, 7 markers, money)

The Avalon Hill edition added a game box. A 6 sided die is also needed to play.

=== Gameplay ===
At the start of the game, Robin Hood and unrecruited outlaws are scattered across the board, while the soldiers are gathered in three castles. Robin must recruit others to his band, who then rob travelers in the forest to generate income. Robin must engage in personal combat with several would-be leaders, and if wounded, must remain inactive for a turn, which may lead to his capture. Will Scarlet, Alan-a-Dale and Maid Marion appear at random times and locations. If non-leaders are captured and hanged by the Sheriff, replacements can be recruited. However, if named leaders are hanged, they cannot be replaced. When Will and Alan appear, they are unrecruited and face no danger from the soldiers until they join the Merry Men. However Maid Marion is automatically part of the Merry Men, and can be captured by the soldiers the turn she appears unless Merry Men reach her first. If the Sheriff captures and hangs Robin, the game is over. One of Robin's victory conditions is to wed Maid Marion before the villainous Sir Guy can force her to wed, and he can do that by being in the same area as Maid Marion and Alan-a-Dale. King Richard I appears near the end of the game, giving Robin Hood a chance to enter the same area as the king and gain a pardon, another of his victory conditions, and the one that ends the game immediately.

=== Victory conditions ===
Robin Hood must be free at the end of the game and achieve 3 out of 4 victory conditions:

1. Own more than 20 marks of gold
2. Deplete the Sheriff's treasury to less than 5 marks
3. Marry Maid Marion
4. Receive a pardon from King Richard.

The Sheriff wins by either preventing Robin from achieving three victory conditions, by hanging Robin (ending the game immediately), or by holding Robin captive at the end of the game.

== Publication history ==
Several games published by OSG in the 1970s such as Arcola and Devil's Den were bought and republished by Avalon Hill. Such was the case with The Legend of Robin Hood, a game designed by Joe Bislo with artwork by Larry Catalona, and published as a ziplock bag microgame by OSG in 1979. Avalon Hill subsequently bought the game and republished it in 1983 as a small boxed set.

== Reception ==
In Issue 78 of Games & Puzzles, Nick Palmer reviewed the OSG edition and called it "An unpretentious but clever interpretation of the traditional Sherwood Forest saga." However, Palmer found the game to be unbalanced in favor of the sheriff, saying, "After a few games, I find it hard to see how Robin can win without a great deal of luck." He concluded by giving the game a below-average Excitement rating of 2 out of 5, saying, "Quite fun, and a neat little problem, but too diffuse with its numerous small skirmishes and a strong chance element to be altogether satisfying as a game. A good one to try on non-gamers, though."

Richard A. Edwards reviewed the original edition in The Space Gamer No. 34. Edwards commented that "For a fun, fast, and thoroughly delightful game, the price is certainly a steal. I recommend The Legend of Robin Hood to all."

In the October 1980 issue of Fantastic, game designer Greg Costikyan wrote "Robin Hood seems to contain most of the elements of the legend — but play drags a bit."

Mike Dean reviewed the Avalon Hill edition for Imagine magazine, and stated that "The Robin Hood stories could be resolved into a good game - I would not say this was it. but if you like two player games, this one is not bad."

== Awards ==
At the 1983 Origins Awards, the Avalon Hill edition of The Legend of Robin Hood was a finalist for the Charles S. Roberts Award for "Best Fantasy Board Game of 1982".
