= Star Quest (board game) =

Board game

Star Quest is a science fiction board game published by Operational Studies Group (OSG) in 1979.

== Description ==
Star Quest is a game of space combat for 2–6 players. Each player represents an interstellar trading house that has sent a spaceship to a newly discovered star system in order to destroy all other ships and take control of the system.

=== Components ===
The plastic bag holds:

- 11" x 17" paper hex grid map of the star system
- 100 die-cut counters
- plot sheet (to be photocopied — each player requires a clean plot sheet for each game)
- 4-page rulebook

=== Gameplay ===
==== Movement ====
The game starts as ships hyperjump into the star system, ending at a random location. The initial hyperjump is quite risky — if the player rolls a 6 on a six-sided die, the ship is destroyed and the player is out of the game. If a ship is moved by hyperjump later in the game (moving again to a random location), there is no chance of destruction.

Using "normal" movement, ships travel in a straight line, with momentum from the previous turn carried over to the next turn. The gravitational effects of the star are felt at close range.

==== Combat ====
The ships fight by firing missiles at one another; each ship can control up to six missiles at a time. If a missile and a ship intersect, the missile is deemed to have exploded and destroyed the ship. Both are removed from the game.

=== Victory conditions ===
The last player to survive is the winner.

== Publication history ==
In 1977, Cinematronics released a shooter video game titled Space Wars that pitted two players against each other, flying spaceships around a sun, firing missiles, and using hyperjump to move to a random location on the screen. It became the 4th highest grossing arcade game of 1978 in the United States. The following year, Ed Curran and Tom Walcyk designed a microgame based on Space Wars titled Star Quest, which was released by OSG packaged in a plastic bag.

== Reception ==
In Issue 33 of The Space Gamer, Robert D. Buskirk found the rules "very clear", and liked that it was a very fast game. However, he didn't like the components, finding the hex numbers on the map hard to read, and the light blue and dark blue counters too similar. However, he did note that for a small and short game, "Play can become very tense, and with two players, it often has the flavor of a duel." He thought that although the rules were clear, learning them and how to pre-plan several turns in advance required experience. He concluded by giving the game a below average score of 5 out of 10, although he admitted, "After you learn it, Starquest can give you a challenging, fast game, even with its problems."

In the inaugural issue of Ares Magazine, Steve List thought this was a reasonable game for its size and price, commenting "As a space combat game, it is morer realistic than most, in that it almost obeys the laws of physics." He also noted that the game required players to both "plan ahead and react quickly." He concluded by giving it a below average score of 5 out of 9, saying, "If one ignores the rationale (the game is based on a coin-operated game), and the minor inconvenience of photocopying the plot sheets, it is a serviceable little game."

In the October 1980 issue of Fantastic, game designer Greg Costikyan wrote "Ships fight by firing missiles at each other. They may use 'hyperspace' movement, in which case their new position on the board is determined randomly — if this is beginning to sound like a noted video space game, there's no coincidence. Star Quest is the Space Wars video game, put in boardgame format; the differences are rather minimal. Save your $4; 16 quarters will get you a good number of minutes on the Space Wars machine at your local pinball parlor, and your time will be better spent."
