= Operational Studies Group =

Publisher of board wargames

Logo

Operational Studies Group (OSG) is a publisher of board wargames.

== History ==
Kevin Zucker, the Managing Editor at the wargame publisher Simulations Publications Inc. (SPI), left the company in January 1976. He and other ex-SPI employees started to plan a Napoleonic wargame that would be presented as a spiral-bound book. However the logistics of this format were beyond the ability of the group to create economically, and in the end, the group changed the design to a ziplock bag game titled Napoleon at Bay. In order to publish the game, Zucker formed the company Tactical Studies Group, and convinced George Blagowidow, the owner of Hippocrene Books and distributor of SPI wargames, to buy 800 copies. On the basis of that sale, Zucker convinced SPI's printer to print 2000 copies. Zucker went to Origins '78 with the ziplock game and sold 250 copies.

Due to the similarity of "Tactical Studies Group" and "Tactical Studies Rules" (TSR — the publishers of Dungeons & Dragons), Zucker changed the name of his company to Operational Studies Group (OSG) and published the World War II wargames Panzerkrieg and Rommel & Tunisia. At the 1978 Origins Awards, Napoleon at Bay was a finalist for the Charles S. Roberts Award for "Best Pre-Twentieth Century Game". The following year, Zucker designed Napoleon at Leipzig, which won the Charles S. Roberts award for "Best Pre-Twentieth Century Game".

However, that same year, Zucker left OSG and moved to Baltimore, Maryland to join game publisher Avalon Hill. In his absence, OSG published another Napoleonic wargame, Arcola, but also branched out into the science fiction with Star Quest, and fiction with The Legend of Robin Hood. Further products included the American Civil War game Devil's Den and the modern-day wargame Air Cobra, but OSG went out of business shortly afterwards.

After an absence of almost twenty years, Zucker eventually refounded the moribund OSG as a publisher of operational-level wargames about Napoleon's campaigns, and released Bonaparte in Italy: The Defense of Mantua and the Quadrilateral in 2000.

In October 2008, Zucker announced that OSG was going out of business at the end of the year, but after a year-long hiatus, the company recommenced production with The Coming Storm, which was a finalist for the Charles S. Roberts Award for "Best Ancient to Napoleonic Era Wargame of 2010".

OSG continued to publish operational wargames about Napoleon's campaigns into the 2020s.

== Awards ==
Several OSG games have received industry recognition by winning or being a finalist for a Charles S. Roberts Award:

- Napoleon at Bay: Finalist, "Best Pre-Twentieth Century Game of 1978"
- Napoleon at Leipzig: Winner, "Best Pre-Twentieth Century Game of 1979"
- The Legend of Robin Hood: Finalist, "Best Fantasy Board Game of 1981"
- Four Lost Battles: Finalist, "Best Wargame Graphics of 2005"
- The Coming Storm: Finalist, "Best Ancient to Napoleonic Era Wargame of 2010"
- Napoleon Retreats: Finalist, "Best Napoleonic Era Board Wargame of 2019"
- Napoleon's Wheel: Finalist, "Best Napoleonic Era Board Wargame of 2020"

== List of OSG games ==
- Napoleon at Bay (1978)
- Panzerkrieg (1978)
- Rommel & Tunisia (1978)
- Arcola, The Battle for Italy 1796 (1979)
- Napoleon at Leipzig (1979)
- Bonaparte in Italy(1979)
- Star Quest (1979)
- The Legend of Robin Hood (1979)
- Dark December (1979)
- Devil's Den (1980)
- Air Cobra (1980)
- Bonaparte in Italy: The Defense of Mantua and the Quadrilateral (2000)
- Highways to the Kremlin (2001)
- Four Lost Battles (2005)
- The Coming Storm (2010)
- Napoleon's Last Gamble (2016)
- Napoleon's Quagmire (2017)
- Napoleon's Resurgence (2018)
- Napoleon Retreats (2019)
- Napoleon's Wheel (2020)
- Napoleon Invades Spain (2021)
