= Vasily Sternberg =

Russian painter

- Василий Иванович Штернберг; Василь Іванович Штернберґ
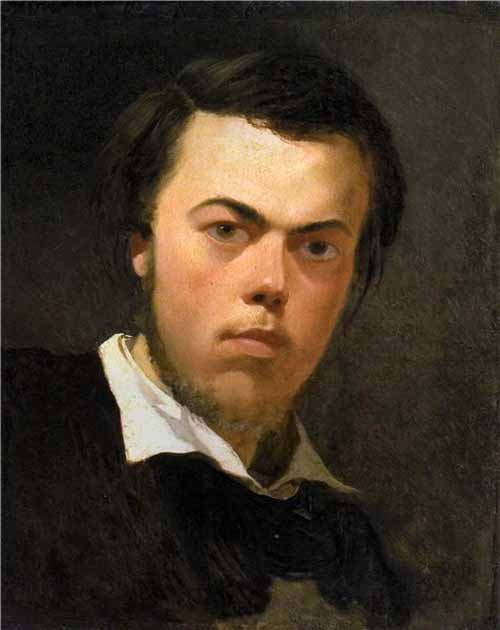
- Self-Portrait, late 1830s, oil on canvas, 42 by 35 cm; Museum of the Academy of Arts, St. Petersburg
- Born: February 12, 1818; St. Petersburg
- Died: September 8, 1845 (aged 27); Rome
- Resting place: Protestant Cemetery, Rome
- Education: Imperial Academy of Arts
- Known for: Painting
- Awards: Big Gold Medal of the Imperial Academy of Arts (1838)

Vasily Ivanovich Sternberg (Ukrainian: Василь Іванович Штернберґ, Russian: Василий Иванович Штернберг (12 February 1818, Saint Petersburg - 8 September 1845, Rome) was a Russian and Ukrainian landscape and genre painter.

== Biography ==
His father was a mining official. He began by auditing classes at the Imperial Academy of Arts and became a full student in 1835, studying landscape painting with Maxim Vorobiev. In addition to his formal works, he was known for his delightful drawings and caricatures.

Summers were spent at the home of his patron in a region of Ukraine known as "Little Russia". Many of his best-known works were inspired by what he saw there. Some of his works were purchased by Tsar Nicholas I as gifts for the Tsar's family. He was honored with the title of "Artist Class XIV".

From 1839 to 1840, he served in the expeditionary force to Khiva, led by General Vasily Alekseevich Perovsky. Following that, he received a fellowship from the Academy to work in Rome. He died there five years later, aged only twenty-seven.

== Selected paintings ==
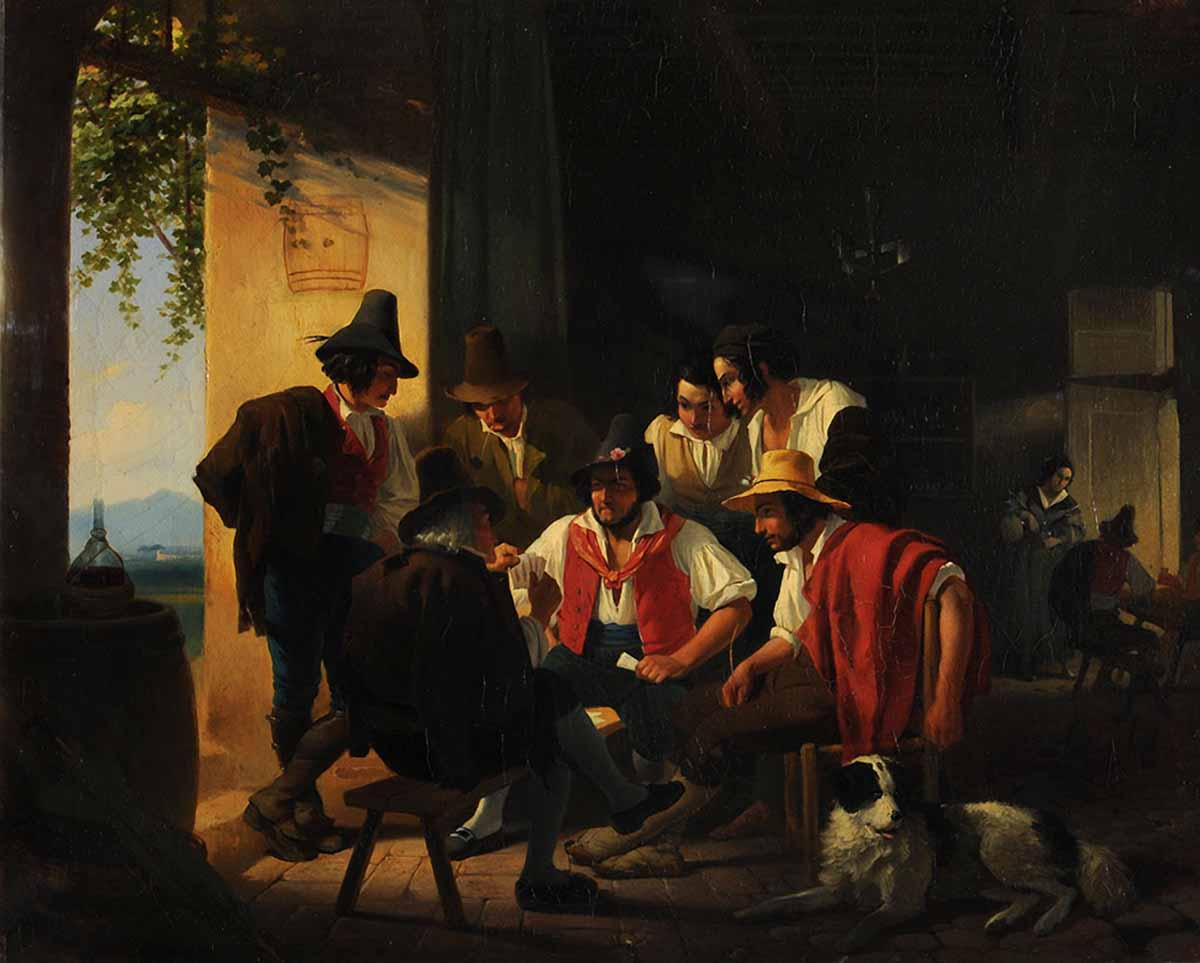
Italian Peasants, playing cards
at the Osteria

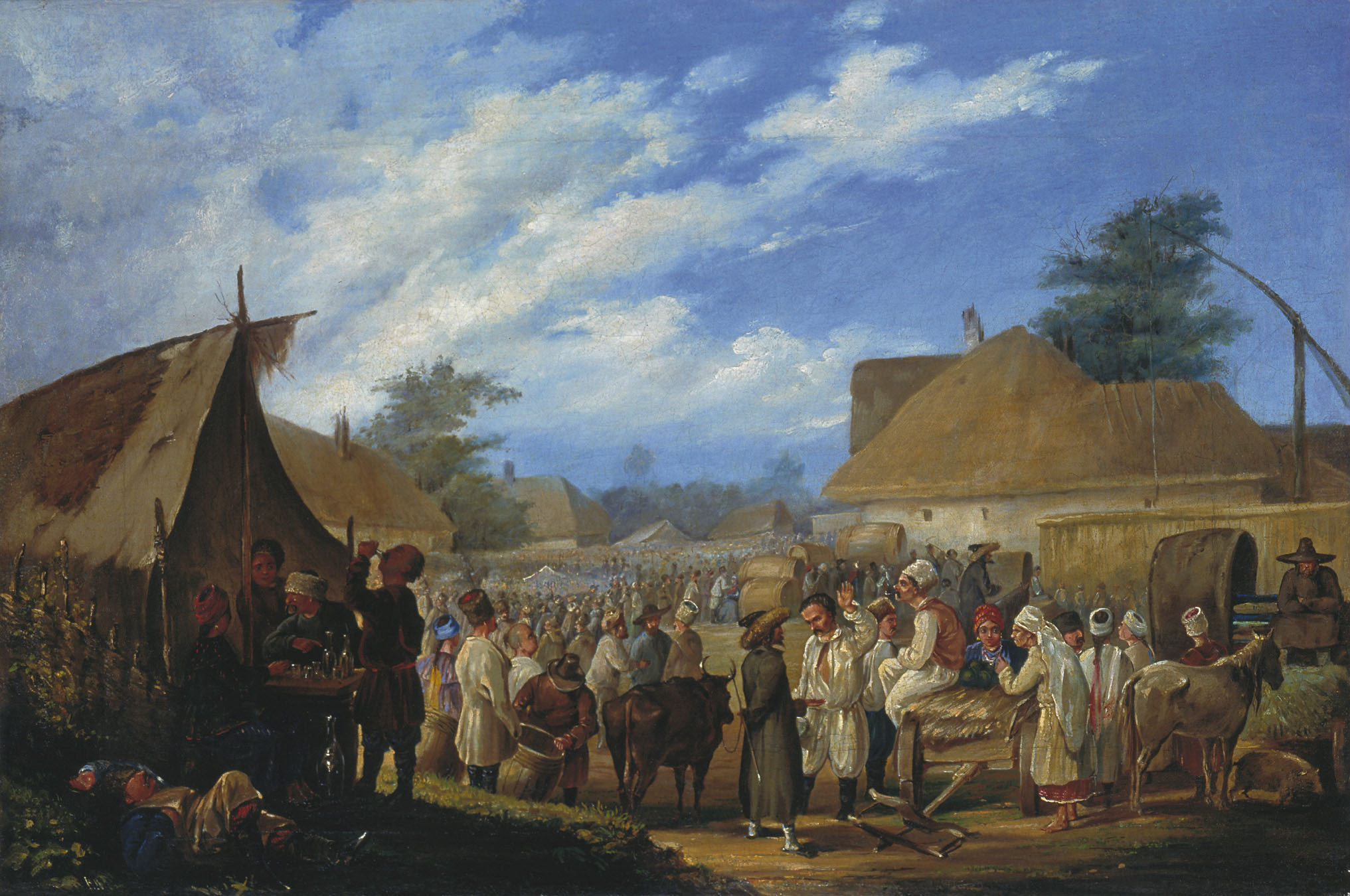
A Fair in Ukraine

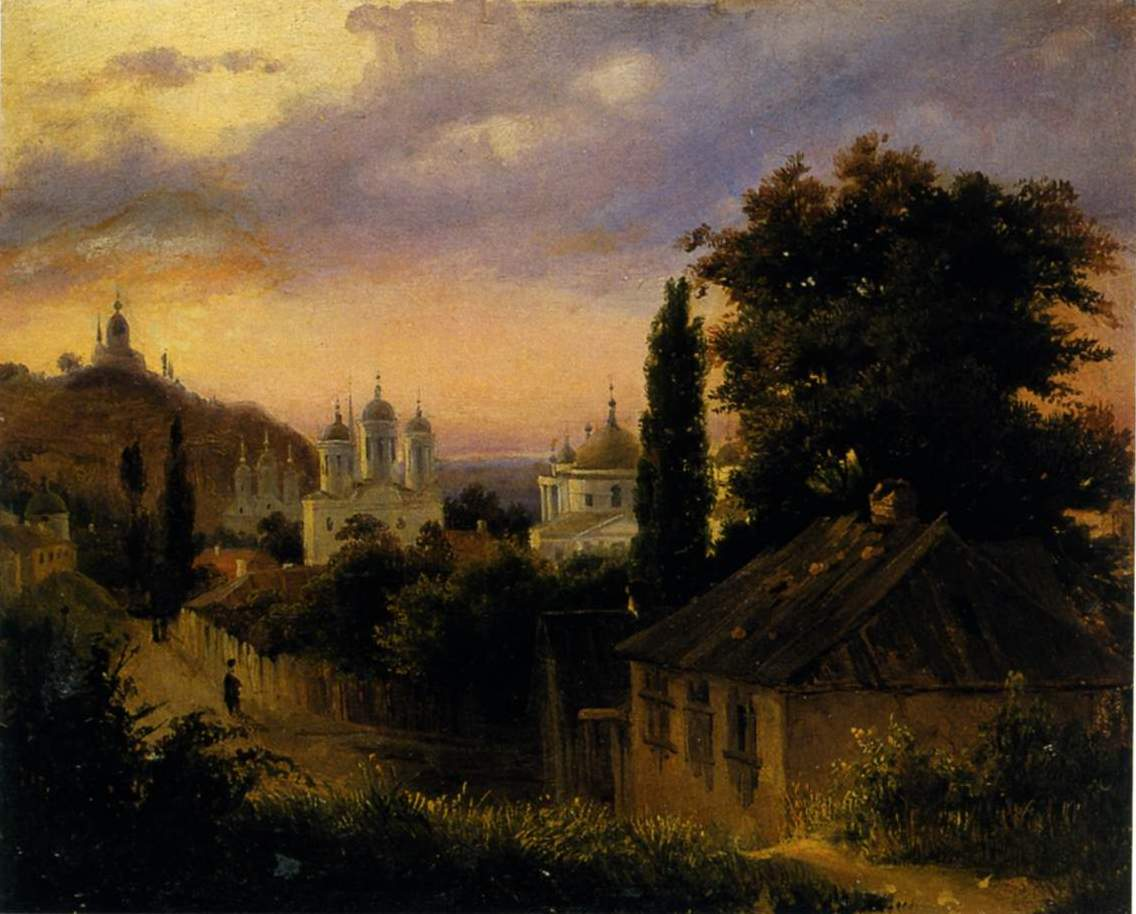
View of Podil, in Kiev

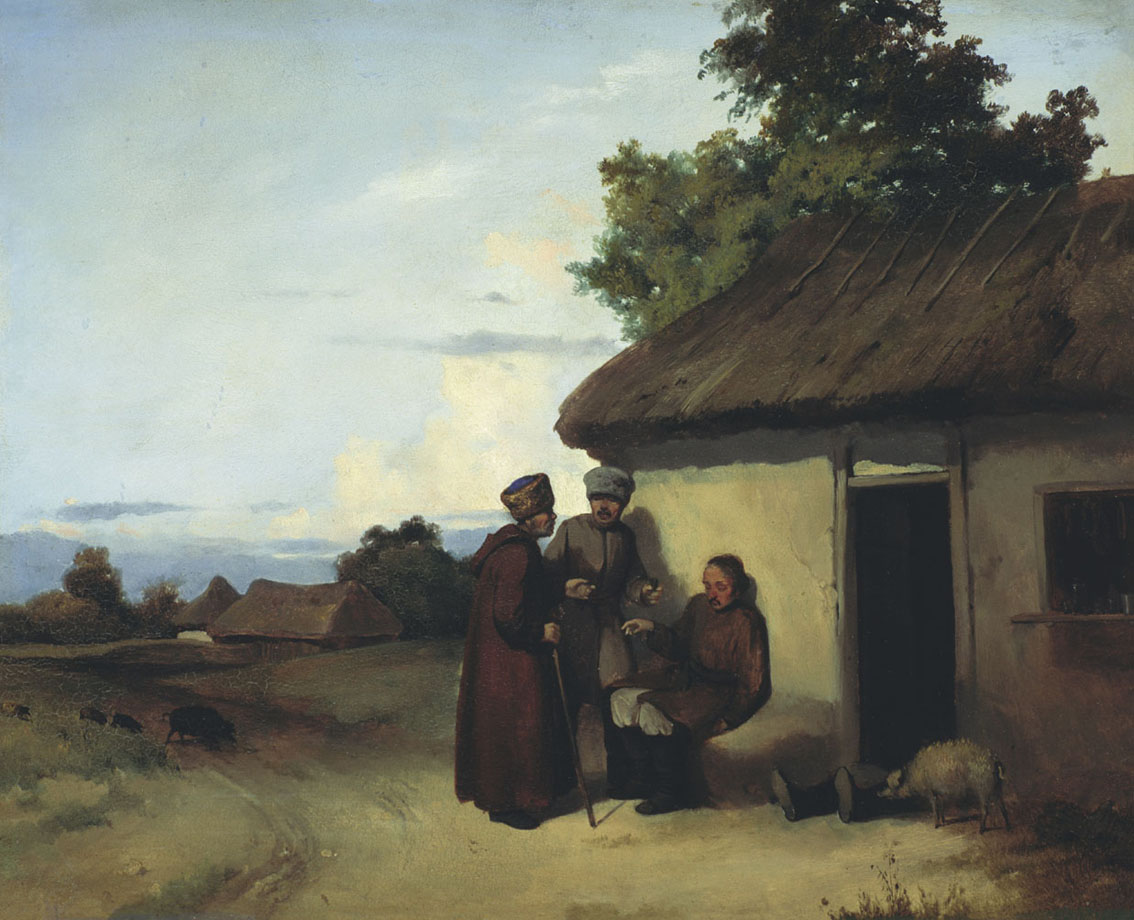
Shinok (peasant's tavern)
in Little Russia
