= Dark December (game) =

1979 WWII board wargame

- OSG edition, 1979
- Designers: Danny S. Parker
- Illustrators: Masahiro Yamazaki
- Publishers: Operational Studies Group; Six Angles
- Publication: 1979; 47 years ago
- Genres: Board wargame; Simulation game
- Languages: English
- Players: 1-2
- Playing time: 120 minutes
- Age range: 14+

Dark December is a board wargame published by Operational Studies Group (OSG) in 1979 that simulates the Battle of the Bulge.

== Background ==
In December 1944, Allied intelligence believed that German forces were close to collapse and could not mount an attack. However, German forces surprised the Allies with a major offensive through the Ardennes that had the combined objectives of splitting the Allied forces in two, preventing the use of the port of Antwerp, and forcing the Allies to sue for peace. German forces managed to create a large salient in Allied lines (the "Bulge") before the attack was blunted and stopped, the Germans' objectives left unfulfilled.

== Description ==
Dark December is a two-player game where one player controls German forces, and the other player controls Allied forces. The hex grid map has a scale of 3.2 km (2 mi) per hex. With straightforward rules and only 75 military units counters, the game has been characterized as "simple and playable" — British critic Nicky Palmer gave it a complexity rating of only 25 on a scale of 100.

=== Gameplay ===
The game uses a standard alternating "I Go, You Go" system, where the German player checks supply, moves, attacks, and constructs or demolishes bridges. The Allied player then has the same phases. This completes one game turn, which represents 12 hours of the battle.

Fuel shortages on both sides marked the Battle of the Bulge. At the start of each turn, the German player must check every one of their armored units to see which has fuel, and the American player must designate one division as out of fuel.

At the end of their turn, each player can build bridges (German player) or demolish bridges (Allied player). The German player may only build seven bridges during the game.

The game designer, Danny Parker, created a mixture of rules from a range of previously published "Battle of the Bulge" and other armored combat games by Simulations Publications Inc., including

- combat results based on terrain retreat values (from Fulda Gap, 1977, and Crete, 1969)
- Strategic Movement — units can travel quickly travel on unoccupied roads (from Wacht am Rhein, 1977)
- Road March Movement for infantry, infiltration by the Panzer Brigade 150, and construction/destruction of bridges (from Battles for the Ardennes, 1977)

Armor superiority gives a combat bonus but the attacker's losses must be taken from the tank units.

The weather has an effect on movement, being unsupplied has an impact on combat results, and terrain has an effect on both movement and combat results.

Leaders can make a stand and fight rather than retreat and can make units press another attack when the first attack is unsuccessful.

There are also optional rules for surrender, disengagement, and fog.

Another optional rule allows units which do not move to be placed in reserve to exploit after combat or (in defence) to react to enemy attacks – this benefits the Germans as the US are very short of units to begin with.

=== Scenarios ===
The game includes three scenarios:

- "Herbstnebel" ("Autumn Fog" ): 16 Dec to 19 Dec, eight game turns
- "Turning Point": 22 Dec to 25 Dec, eight game turns
- "Final Fury": 26 Dec to 2 Jan, sixteen game turns

The game also includes three long games:

- "Campaign Game": combines the first two short scenarios, 16 Dec to 25 Dec, twenty game turns
- "Extended Campaign Game": Covers all three scenarios, 16 Dec to 2 Jan, in thirty-six game turns
- "The Reduction of the Bulge": The long Allied campaign from 26 Dec to 31 Jan to recover the territory lost at the start of the battle, seventy-six game turns

A series of nineteen optional rules allow players to construct "what if?" scenarios by tinkering with things like Allied readiness, command response times, reinforcements, German opening deployment, and reinforcements. A good deal of historical commentary is included to help players make up their minds.

== Publication history ==
As a game designer for SPI, Danny Parker helped to design the 1977 monster game about the Battle of the Bulge, Wacht am Rhein. The following year, Parker designed four small games about various parts of the Battle of the Bulge, packaged together in one box titled Battles for the Ardennes (BFTA). In 1979, Parker moved to OSG to create another Battle of the Bulge game, Dark December, originally intended as a replacement for Avalon Hill's Battle of the Bulge, from which it borrows some concepts.

In 2005, Six Angles Publications published a Japanese-language version with cover artwork by Masahiro Yamazaki.

== Reception ==
In Issue 45 of the British wargaming magazine Perfidious Albion, Nicholas Barker asked "Who needs another Bulge game? Well, this one is probably worth the money ... Complexity is about the same as BFTA, but the loss of the small units, artillery and air power has speeded up things no end." Barker concluded, "I liked this one more than BFTA since it gives the feel of the whole campaign but can be played in a single day ... A good game and a good simulation with a lot of flavour to it."

British critic Nicky Palmer wrote about the game several times. In Issue 78 of the British magazine Games & Puzzles, Palmer called Dark December "a curious amalgam of design techniques by Danny Parker." Palmer criticized the game's "unattractive" map but also stated that the "generosity in supplementary material does add to the pleasure of play." In his 1980 book The Best of Board Wargaming, Palmer asked if this game was essential, given the large number of "Bulge" games already on the market, and answered, "On balance, it does justify its existence with a surprising range of detailed rules in a very simple framework." Palmer was critical of the hard-to-read counters, poorly printed and similar in colour to the map colours, but gave the game an excellent Excitement Grade of 85%, saying, "The designer's suggestion that players restrict themselves to a 7½ minute time limit per move does look feasible ... allowing the completion of a fair-sized scenario in a few hours — a rare virtue nowadays."

In Issue 38 of Moves, game designer Eric Goldberg commented, "The design work on combat is the heart of Dark December, and it makes a potentially mediocre game a good game." Goldberg concluded, "One benefit of the proliferation of Bulge games is that each succeeding product must be at least above average to attract a decent market share. If we assume that conflict simulations give insight into the history, then Dark December gives the best overview of the [Battle of the Bulge]."

== Other reviews and commentary ==
- Battleplan Vol.1 #2
- Campaign #95
- Fire & Movement #20 & #65
- Paper Wars #31
- Strategy & Tactics #37 & #71
- The Wargamer Vol.1 #10 & Vol.2 #17
