= Napoleon's Last Battles =

1976 Napoleonic board wargame

- Cover of original SPI edition, 1976
- Designers: Kevin Zucker; Jay Nelson
- Illustrators: Redmond A. Simonsen
- Publishers: SPI
- Publication: 1976
- Genres: Napoleonic

Napoleon's Last Battles is a board wargame published by Simulations Publications in 1976 that simulates the last four battles fought by Napoleon. It was one of SPI's most popular games, and also received many positive reviews.

== Description ==
Napoleon's Last Battles is a "quadrigame" — a box with four different battles played using the same rules. This game covers the last four battles of Napoleon's final campaign of 1815:

- Ligny: The French and Prussians clash in the first battle of the Waterloo campaign.
- Quatre Bras: The Anglo-Allies under Wellington holding a strategic intersection called Quatre Bras are attacked by Marshal Ney's French forces.
- Wavre: French and Prussians fighting each other at the Battle of Wavre are both needed at the Battle of Waterloo, so both must attempt to exit the board while preventing the other from doing so.
- La Belle Alliance: The Battle of Waterloo

The various scenarios can be paired together for a longer game. Alternatively all four scenarios and their maps can be joined to form a large campaign game covering all four battles from beginning to end, taking 37 turns to complete.

=== Components ===
The game comes with:

- 8-page rulebook of rules common to all four battles
- 4-page rulebook with rules specific to each battle
- 400 die-cut counters (100 for each game)
- four 22" x 17" paper hex grid maps scaled at 480 m (525 yd) per hex, one map for each battle, or can be joined to form one large 43" x 33" campaign map. (In the Decision Games edition published in 1995, the four maps are combined into two 22" x 32" maps.)

=== Gameplay ===
The rules are based on the system developed for Napoleon at Waterloo published by SPI in 1971, which uses a simple "I Go, You Go" system of alternating player turns:

- The French player moves all units desired, and engages in combat.
- The Allied player then has the same opportunity.

This completes one game turn, which represents 1 hour of game time. In addition, in the basic game, only two units may be stacked on one hex, and there are no supply rules. Zones of control are both "rigid" and "sticky": a unit moving adjacent to an enemy unit must stop there. Combat is mandatory, and units thus engaged cannot move away from each other except as a result of combat.

The Campaign game adds new rules:

- Stacking: Leaders are not considered combat units, and therefore as any number of leaders can be stacked on one hex.
- Command phase (before Movement phase): Players hand out command points to the various senior commanders, who then must decide which of their corps (divisions for Wellington's army) receive a command point, placing it under their direct command. These chosen units must stay within a certain distance of the commander to remain under direct command. Units not under direct command cannot enter enemy zones of control, and suffer penalties when forced to attack.
- Supply phase (first turn of each day): Supply to all units must be checked. Units that are not in supply are removed from play.

== Publication history ==
In 1975, SPI published the "quadrigame" Blue and Gray, packaging four different battles and one set of rules into the same box. The concept proved popular. Napoleon's Last Battles, another quadrigame, was published the following year. It was designed by Kevin Zucker and Jay Nelson, with cartography and graphic design by Redmond A. Simonsen, and proved to be one of SPI's most popular quadrigames, reaching No. 5 on SPI's Top Ten Bestseller List the month it was released. Each of the four games was also released as an individual "folio game", packaged in a cardstock double folder.

In 1979, French and Flemish versions of Napoleon's Last Battles were developed by the Belgian company EDI-AR. Simulacrum noted in 2004 that "This [translation] has been a perfect wargame start for a generation of French [and Belgian] players and it's still sought after by collector gamers.

After TSR took over SPI in 1982, they attempted to get a quick return on their money by publishing several SPI games that had been close to publication such as Battle Over Britain; they also re-published several popular SPI titles such as Napoleon's Last Battles in new packaging, but with the same rules and components.

In the 1990s, Decision Games acquired the rights to the game and republished it with revised and streamlined rules and new components, including two maps rather than four.

== Reception ==
In Issue 15 of the British magazine Perfidious Albion, Steve Clifford called the campaign game this product's "main innovation," but pointed out that in order to bring the four maps together to make a campaign map, the edges of each map had to be trimmed, making them unusable for the four individual games. Clifford found the leadership rules, "an interesting attempt to simulate the effect of commanders on this scale, but are perhaps still a bit cumbersome."

In his 1977 book The Comprehensive Guide to Board Wargaming, Nicholas Palmer noted "plenty of interesting terrain added on the highly attractive maps." He also commented on the "Interesting command rules that appear in the campaign game, with units separated from their leaders unable to make attacks." Palmer also reviewed each of the four games:

- Quatre Bras: "A gripping battle for the crossroads, which swings dramatically to the French and back again."
- Ligny: Potentially fairly long, unless the Prussian defence breaks quickly [...] Tough fighting."
- Wavre: "One of the best puzzles in wargaming, with many different theories on the correct withdrawal strategy."
- La Belle Alliance: "Numerous units are crowded into a small area, and the game is much less interesting than Wavre and Ligny."

In Issue 53 of Moves, Ian Chadwick reviewed all four of the scenarios and the overall campaign game. He called Quatre Bras "short and sweet"; Ligny somewhat constrained by map size; Wavre "short, fast, and furious"; La Belle Alliance "a good, tight game, one with plenty of excitement"; and the campaign game "long and slow [but] it's a good game for both sides." Overall his impression was that "This is one of those rare games were everything seems to work well; the folios are excellent, the campaign game — while not perfect — is good, the rules clean and easily understood, and the components superb." He concluded by giving the game an "A" for playability, a "B+" for historical accuracy, and an "A" for component quality, saying, "A delight and a must in the collection of Napoleonic and tactical buffs."

In Issue 4 of The Wargamer, Chris Hunt commented, "The real difference which puts Napoleon's Last Battles in another league from other quad games is the leadership rules [in the campaign scenario]."

In Issue 11 of the British wargaming magazine Phoenix (Jan–Feb 1978), Ian Daglish called both the map and the counters "vastly improved" over previous SPI Napoleonic products. And despite having a large number of counters to maneuver, Daglish found the game "still flows very nicely." He concluded with a strong recommendation, saying, "Napoleon's Last Battles is a set of four highly enjoyable games. It is also one of the best simulations of the whole Waterloo campaign that you will come across."

A year later, in Issue 17 of Phoenix (Jan–Feb 1979), Jeff Parker compared Napoleon's Last Battles and 1815: The Waterloo Campaign by Games Designers Workshop, two wargames published in 1976, and held both of them up as better Napoleonic wargames than previous products, saying, "Any collector of good boardgames who is also a student of Napoleonic warfare would have these two games. A moulding of the best ideas from each will give a game which goes far towards ameliorating many of the criticisms which can be levelled at the earliest Napoleonic games."

In Issue 6 of the French games magazine Jeux & Stratégie, Michel Brassinne noted "All the rules are clearly written, but require a certain learning time (12 pages!). The search for a certain 'verisimilitude' has led to more rules. This satisfies players accustomed to wargames but can dismay those who try to get started."

In Issue 3 of the French games magazine Casus Belli, Jean-Jacques Petit commented, "If the French player fails to knock out one of the two allied armies before the 17th turn, he will have a hard time winning this campaign. The English player has an interest in backing away until all of his reinforcements have arrived (13th turn) but also in worrying a few French corps (a very difficult strategic exercise). The Prussian player must play his trump card from the first turns before the hypothetical arrival of d'Erlon's 1st corps. In any case, the French player will have a hard time emerging victorious from this campaign."

In The Guide to Simulations/Games for Education and Training, Martin Campion commented on the possible use of this game as an educational aid, saying, "The campaign game is large [...] but it offers many opportunities for involving a lot of people in the command structures of the three armies represented in the campaign, and the campaign game rules are very informative on command structure and its problems."

In the 1980 book The Complete Book of Wargames, game designer Jon Freeman called this collection "less enjoyable than SPI's Napoleon at War quadrigame." Freeman felt that these battles were attritional set pieces, and lacked the ability to maneuver found in Napoleon at War. Freeman concluded by giving an Overall Evaluation of "Good to Very Good."

In a retrospective review twenty years after publication, Monte Gray noted that on the first day Marshal Ney is somewhat constrained, controlling only a single corps on the British flank, which "precludes his trying anything more imaginative than a frontal assault on Quatre Bras. His wire-puller, the French player, faces a major dilemma once the Duke [of Wellington] receives all of his reinforcements: send Grouchy (or even Napoleon himself) to help out Ney, but then how to punch out those pesky Prussians?" Gray suggested using the advanced rules with the campaign game, saying, "This is a decidedly lite basic rules carriage. You need those extra rules horses to get a stimulating ride backward in time." Gray felt that the individual games tended to swing in Napoleon's favor due to limits laid on the Allied generals, but felt in the paired games and large campaign game "the advantage shifts quite a bit [...] mainly because the weight of the added command rules puts a brake on France's ability to conduct double envelopments." Gray concluded on a positive note, saying, "If I'd been familiar with Napoleon's Last Battles 20 years ago, it undoubtedly would have been one of my favorites. Time has been kind to Kevin Zucker's design. It remains easy to learn, difficult to master."

In a retrospective review thirty years after publication, Matt Irsik called this game "One of the best [SPI] Quads. [...] Each game was pretty interesting and very different from all of the others. The mandatory attack rules did a good job of portraying operational level combat from that era and the end result was pretty satisfying."

== Other recognition ==
Napoleon's Last Battles was chosen for inclusion in the 2007 book Hobby Games: The 100 Best. Chris "Gerry" Klug commented "Napoleon's Last Battles is one of the best pencil-and-paper military simulations ever because it's a gloriously wonderful blend of solid, no-frills design, intelligent packaging, and a synergistic combination of the two that delivers a game that is (perhaps unintentionally) more than intended and results in a very happy consumer."

== Other reviews and commentary ==
- Strategy & Tactics #103
- Fire & Movement #6, #24, and Special Issue #1
- Paper Wars #26
- Games & Puzzles #62
