= Napoleon at Bay =

1978 Napoleonic board wargame

Cover of OSG 1st edition

Napoleon at Bay, subtitled "Prelude to Waterloo: The Campaign in France, 1814", is a board wargame published by Tactical Studies Group/Operational Studies Group in 1978 that is a simulation of Napoleon's attempts to keep the Allies out of Paris in the early months of 1814.

== Background ==
After defeat at the Battle of Leipzig, French forces under Napoleon Bonaparte slowly retreated in the first two months of 1814, conducting an aggressive defence and a number of counterattacks against the numerically superior Sixth Coalition. Napoleon won a series of brilliant victories during the Six Days' Campaign before the Allies forced him to fall back towards Paris.

== Description ==
Napoleon at Bay is a two-player wargame at the operational level that uses a set of rules developed by designer Kevin Zucker. The scenario folder also contains a historical narrative from Vincent Esposito's 1964 book The Military History and Atlas of the Napoleonic Wars.

=== Components ===
The original edition's ziplock bag contains:

- two-piece 44" x 35" paper hex grid map, scaled at 3.2 km (2 mi) per hex
- 260 die-cut counters
- 32-page rule book
- 32-page scenario book
- three organizational displays

=== Scenarios ===
Two scenarios are included with the game:

1. The Campaign game, which covers the entire series of battles from January to March 1814
2. "The Six Days Campaign" from 10–15 February 1814

=== Gameplay ===
Only the counters for leaders and commanders appear on the board, while counters for military units are kept on an organizational chart, so the strength of units is not known to the opponent until they engage in combat. Each player starts their turn by consulting the administrative points table to see how many (if any) extra points the player can add to their points pool. These points are used to create movement commands, and to ameliorate march attrition. There are special rules for reinforcements, French garrisons, weather, and morale.

== Publication history ==
2nd edition, Avalon Hill

Kevin Zucker, a managing editor for wargame publisher Simulations Publications, Inc., decided to start up his own games company, Tactical Studies Group, and his first product was Napoleon at Bay, released as a ziplock bag game in 1978. Due to the similarity between the company name "Tactical Studies Group" and "Tactical Studies Rules" (TSR – the publisher of Dungeons & Dragons), Zucker quickly changed the company name to Operational Studies Group (OSG), and re-released Napoleon at Bay as a boxed set.

As would happen with several other OSG games such as Arcola and The Legend of Robin Hood, industry giant Avalon Hill bought Napoleon at Bay, revised it slightly, and published the second edition in 1983.

After the demise of Avalon Hill, OSG regained the rights to Napoleon at Bay, revised the game and republished the third edition in 1997 as Napoleon at Bay: Defend the Gates of Paris, 1814, with interior art and graphics by Christopher Moeller, and Joe Youst, and cover art by Rodger B. MacGowan. Some of the illustrations are reproductions of paintings by Jean-Louis Ernest Meissonier.

== Reception ==
In Issue 45 of the British wargaming magazine Perfidious Albion, Charles Vasey commented, "Rules [are] clear in thrust, but not totally sure in actual applications. An experiment in real design which will repay overlooking the rule-problems. Historical value and play-value [are] high."

In the August–September 1980 issue of Moves (#52), Ian Chadwick called this game "a major breakthrough in dealing with operational levels of Napoleonic campaigns." He noted that "The ability to coordinate the forces and maintain effective command chains best will decide the usual winner." Despite the game's complexity, Chadwick called it "fairly easy to learn." His only complaint was that more scenarios should have been included with the game. He concluded by giving the game grades of B for playability, A for historical accuracy, and B for component quality, saying ""This is a fine game to play [...] All in all, well done and a remarkable entry into the market from a then-new company."

Andrew Blauvelt, writing in The General, noted that "[game designer] Kevin Zucker has presented Napoleon at Bay players with many of the problems faced by [Napoleon, Bluecher and Schwarzenberg], but has not imposed the historical solution to those problems on the play of the game." He concluded, "Napoleon at Bay is proof that it is possible to create a sound and instructive simulation that is also a challenging and absorbing game."

== Awards ==
At the 1979 Origins Awards, Napoleon at Bay was a finalist for the Charles S. Roberts Award in the category "Best Pre-Twentieth Century Game of 1978".

== Other recognition ==
Two copies of Napoleon at Bay are held in the collection of the Strong National Museum of Play: The Tactical Studies Group 1st edition (object 117.2306), and the Avalon Hill 2nd edition (object 117.897).

== Other reviews and commentary ==
- Fire & Movement No. 24
- Strategy & Tactics No. 32
- The Wargamer Vol. 1 No. 8
- Jeux & Stratégie #23
