= Arcola, The Battle for Italy 1796 =

Board wargame published in 1979

Cover art of original OSG edition, 1979

Arcola, The Battle for Italy 1796 is a board wargame published by Operational Studies Group (OSG) in 1979 and republished by Avalon Hill in 1983 that is a simulation of the Battle of Arcola between French and Austrian forces in 1796. The game was designed to tempt players to purchase OSG's previously published and larger wargame Napoleon in Italy.

== Background ==
In Italy in 1796, French forces under Napoleon Bonaparte had besieged the Austrian-held city of Mantua. Austrian commander József Alvinczi led a two-pronged attack to try to break the siege. Napoleon, in a risky move, divided his forces to try to meet and defeat both prongs of Alvinczi's attack.

== Description ==
Arcola is a two-player microgame in which one player controls French forces, and the other controls the Austrian forces. Unlike many board wargames, where all the unit counters are placed on the map, in Arcola, only the leaders are put on the map. The units they are leading are put on an organizational chart

=== Components ===
The original OSG edition, packaged in a ziplock bag, contains:

- 11" x 17" paper hex grid map scaled at 3.2 km (2 mi) per hex
- 100 counters
- 8-page rule booklet

=== Gameplay ===
The game lasts for seven turns, each turn representing 2 days. The Austrians move first each turn. Only leaders are placed on the map, while units under each leader's command are placed on organizational tracks.

=== Movement ===
Each leader has an Initiative rating, and cannot move unless the player successfully rolls the leader's initiative or lower. The Austrians are given one free movement not requiring an Initiative check as long as the leader is within ten Cavalry Movement Points of a Dispatch Hex.

=== Combat ===
As a result of combat, the losing unit loses strength points and is required to retreat a certain number of hexes. The victorious player rolls a die to see how far their unit may move in pursuit. The retreating unit must lose strength points equal to what the victorious unit lost or the number of hexes the victorious unit can pursue, whichever is greater. If the victorious unit catches the defending unit, the retreating unit is eliminated. In addition, units that lose too many strength points become offensively ineffective, although they can still fight defensively.

=== Victory conditions ===
The Austrians win by if they are in possession of Verona at the end of the game and the French have not completely surrounded the city. Alternatively the Austrians can win by exiting 10 or more strength points off the south edge of the map. The French win by preventing an Austrian victory.

== Publication history ==
Arcola was designed by Kevin Zucker as a microgame using the same system as Zucker's previously published full-sized wargame Bonaparte in Italy (1975). The game was packaged in a ziplock bag and published by OSG in 1979.

In 1983, Avalon Hill republished the game in a small box with a mounted map, retitled Battle for Italy. The eight pages of the original rule booklet were reprinted on both sides of a single 8.5" x 11 piece of paper; the game mechanics remained unchanged.

== Reception ==
In his 1980 book The Best of Board Wargaming, Nicholas Palmer noted that this game was designed to convince gamers to buy a larger and more expensive version, saying, "The structure of the larger game is squeezed into the smaller format, offering players a foretaste of the game system before they pay for the whole meal, so to speak." He called the combat results table "innovative". However, overall, he found "The situation shown is not particularly interesting." He concluded by giving the game an average "excitement" grade of 75%.

In Issue 26 of the British wargaming magazine Phoenix, Peter Bolton was not impressed, writing, "The overall impression of Arcola is one of disappointment." Bolton felt the game could have been better, especially the leader-movement rules. On the plus side, he noted that "Certainly the feel that this is warfare Napoleon Bonaparte style is conveyed and to a greater degree that other games of the same period and same level." But he questioned whether playing this game would tempt players to purchase OSG's larger Bonaparte in Italy, saying, "To become more than just another game for the odd hour, more is needed. It is going to require a fair bit of imagination if Arcola is to succeed as a carrot to tempt gamers to go for Bonaparte in Italy."

In Issue 52 of Moves, Ian Chadwick found the map area too small, and the rules did not work for a small game. He gave the game grades of B for playability, B for historical accuracy, and A for component quality.

In Issue 78 of Games & Puzzles, Nick Palmer noted that Arcola "certainly whets the appetite for the larger game [Napoleon in Italy]." Regarding the lack of unit counters on the map, Palmer commented, "This ultimate refinement of the headquarters concept certainly leaves the map uncluttered, though the need for constant reference to the organization tracks is rather a chore and I imagine even more so in the larger game." Palmer concluded by giving the game an average Excitement grade of 3 out of 5, saying, "More 'operational' than most Napoleonic games, with not much tactical detail, but nonetheless a fair number of rules to absorb."

In Issue 28 of The Grenadier, Marion Bates commented, "The game does play quickly and offers a very balanced contest between two relatively equal players. Both players have their work cut out for them, and some subtle play will be required." However, Bates pointed out, "The limited units, the restricted play area, and the very specific victory conditions will eventually lead to stereotyped play." Bates concluded, "Unfortunately, neither player has a great deal of flexibility in his approaches to strategy, though it is still a pleasant enough way to spend an hour and can be a nail-biting experience."

In a retrospective review in Issue 4 of Simulacrum, Joe Scoleri commented "Concealed units, low counter density and variable unit strengths are some of the interesting features in this Napoleonic microgame." Scoleri concluded, "This appears to be an excellent introductory game for someone interested in the period but probably lacks the [complex positional rules] desired by [hard-core gamers].

David Lent, writing for Centurion's Review, reviewed the Avalon Hill edition and found the original rules reprinted on a single sheet of paper were annoying, noting "Subsequent pages are not next to each other and you have to flip over and search the paper for the next page in the sequence. This makes looking up rules during the game a real headache." In addition, Lent found the rules "were not crystal clear." However, he admitted that the game played quickly once the players had learned the rules, often reaching a resolution in 30 minutes. Lent concluded with ambivalence, saying, "I had fun playing it, but not enough units activated per turn. There were not any occasions where anything exceptionally interesting happened because of that."

== Other reviews and commentary ==
- Strategy & Tactics #32
- The General Vol.21 #2
- Strategy & Tactics #79
