= Kevin Zucker (game designer) =

Kevin S. Zucker (born June 26, 1952) is an American wargame designer, historian, author, and musician.

== SPI ==
Kevin Zucker started playing board wargames as a teenager in La Jolla, California, and began to design his own games. In 1971 he found his first job in the wargaming world as co-founder and editor of the first two issues of Conflict magazine. Zucker then moved to New York to work for the wargame publisher Simulations Publications Inc. (SPI). Zucker worked his way up to Production Manager, and over two years, oversaw production of 24 issues of Strategy & Tactics plus the games enclosed in each issue, and 48 boxed games.

== OSG ==
Zucker left SPI in January 1976, but stayed in New York and spent his time working in bookstores and studying music. Zucker met with other ex-SPI employees, and the group started to plan a Napoleonic wargame that would be presented as a spiral-bound book. However the logistics of this format were beyond the ability of the group to create economically, and in the end, the group changed the design to a ziplock bag game titled Napoleon at Bay. In order to publish the game, Zucker formed the company Tactical Studies Group, and convinced George Blagowidow, the owner of Hippocrene Books and distributor of SPI wargames, to buy 800 copies. On the basis of that sale, Zucker convinced SPI's printer to print 2000 copies. Zucker went to Origins '78 with the ziplock game and sold 250 copies.

Due to the similarity of "Tactical Studies Group" and "Tactical Studies Rules" (TSR — the publishers of Dungeons & Dragons), Zucker changed the name of his company to Operational Studies Group (OSG). At the 1978 Origins Awards, Napoleon at Bay was a finalist for the Charles S. Roberts Award for "Best Pre-Twentieth Century Game". The following year, Zucker's game Napoleon at Leipzig won the Charles S. Roberts award for "Best Pre-Twentieth Century Game".

== Avalon Hill and college ==
In 1979, Zucker left OSG and moved to Baltimore, Maryland to join game publisher Avalon Hill. In his absence, OSG carried on for a year, then went out of business. At Avalon Hill, Zucker designed The Struggle of Nations, which was a finalist for the Charles S. Roberts Award for "Best Pre-Twentieth Century Game of 1981." Zucker left Avalon Hill after a year to go back to college to study music. In addition to his studies, he designed 1809: Napoleon's Danube Campaign for Victory Games; the game was also a Charles S. Roberts Award finalist, for "Best Pre-Twentieth Century Game of 1983."

In 1985, while still at school, Zucker was approached by Ed Wimble to provide a wargame for his new game company called Clash of Arms. The result was The Emperor Returns, published in 1986.

Zucker graduated with a Bachelor of Arts in Music and Visual Arts in 1985.

== OSG resurrected ==
Zucker eventually refounded the moribund OSG as a publisher of operational-level wargames about Napoleon's campaigns, and published Bonaparte in Italy: The Defense of Mantua and the Quadrilateral in 2000. Zucker was inducted into the Clausewitz Award Hall of Fame in 2003 for his contributions to wargaming.

In October 2008, Zucker announced that OSG was going out of business at the end of the year, but after a year-long hiatus, the company recommenced production with The Coming Storm, which was a finalist for the Charles S. Roberts Award for "Best Ancient to Napoleonic Era Wargame of 2010".

In addition to designing Napoleonic games for OSG, Zucker also became interested in flower essence therapy, and created The Flower Essence Game for the Flower Essence Society in 2018.

== Published games ==
=== SPI ===
- Bloody Ridge (in Island War Quad), 1974, SPI
- Napoleon's Last Battles, 1975, SPI; reprinted in 1984 by TSR, and in 1995 by Decision Games

=== OSG ===
- Napoleon at Bay, 1978; reprinted in 1983 by Avalon Hill, and by OSG in 1997
- Battles of the Hundred Days, 1979; reprinted in 1983 by Avalon Hill
- Arcola, 1979; reprinted (as Battle for Italy) in 1983 by Avalon Hill
- Napoleon at Leipzig, 1979; reprint 1989 and 1994 by Clash of Arms; 5th Ed. 2013 OSG
- Bonaparte in Italy, 1980; reprinted in 2000
- 1806: Rossbach Avenged, 1998
- La Guerre de l'Empereur (The Emperor's War) 1998
- Last Days of the Grande Armée, 1999
- Highway to the Kremlin, 2001; 2d Ed., 2021
- The Sun of Austerlitz, 2003
- Seven Days of 1809, 2004
- Four Lost Battles, 2005; 2d Ed., 2022
- Napoleon at the Crossroads, 2006
- The Habit of Victory, 2007
- The Coming Storm, 2010
- The Last Success, 2012
- La Patrie en Danger, 2014
- Napoleon Against Russia, 2015
- Napoleon’s Last Gamble, 2016
- Napoleon’s Quagmire, 2017
- Napoleon’s Resurgence, 2018
- Napoleon Retreats, 2019
- Napoleon's Wheel, 2020
- Napoleon Invades Spain, 2021
- Bonaparte in the Quadrilateral, 2022
- Bonaparte Overruns Piedmont, 2023

=== Avalon Hill ===
- Struggle of Nations, 1982

=== Victory Games ===
- 1809: Napoleon on the Danube, 1984

=== Clash of Arms ===
- The Emperor Returns, 1986
- 1807: The Eagles Turn East, 1994

=== Self-published ===
- The Flower Essence Game, 2018

=== Historical Research Series ===
- Nr. 1, 1813: The Year That Doomed the Empire, 2007; Second Edition, 2016
- Nr. 2, 1806: The Autumn of No Return, 2008
- Nr. 3, 1807: Stalemate in the Snow, 2008
- Nr. 4, 1807: Triumph Without Victory, 2008
- Nr. 5, 1806: The Coming Storm, 2009
- Nr. 6, 1809: A Fatal Necessity, 2012
- Nr. 7, 1814: The Fall of Empire, 2016 (with Louis Bélanger)
