= List of board wargames =

This is a list of board wargames by historical genre (and some subgenres) showing their publication history. All games can be presumed to have been published in English unless another language is noted.

== Historical ==
| Name | Publisher | Year | Notes |
|---|---|---|---|
| The Art of Siege | Simulations Publications, Inc. | 1979 | |
| Combined Arms | Simulations Publications, Inc. | 1974 | S&T No. 46, 1974 |

=== Ancient ===
| Name | Publisher | Year | Notes |
|---|---|---|---|
| 300 Spartans | Zvezda | 2003 | |
| Acre | Simulations Publications, Inc. | 1978 | |
| Alaric the Goth: Fall of the Western Roman Empire | Strategic Studies Games | 1980 | |
| Alexander at Tyre | Thunderhaven Game Co. | 1993 | |
| Alexander the Great | Guidon Games | 1971 | Re-released by Avalon Hill in 1974 |
| Ancient Conquest | Excalibre Games | 1975 | |
| Ancient Conquest II | Excalibre Games | 1978 | |
| Ancients | Good Industries | 1990 | Re-released by 3W in 1992 and by Games Publications Group in 1999 |
| Assyrian Wars | Udo Grebe Gamedesign | 2005 | |
| Armageddon: Tactical Combat, 3000-500 BC | Simulations Publications, Inc. | 1972 | S&T, No. 34. |
| Battles of the Ancient World: Marathon & Granicus | Decision Games | 2003 | S&T, No. 214. |
| Caesar: Epic Battle at Alesia | Avalon Hill | 1976 | |
| Centurion: Tactical Warfare, 100 BC-600 AD | Simulations Publications, Inc. | 1971 | S&T No. 25 |
| Chandragupta | GMT Games | 2008 | |
| Chariot | Simulations Publications, Inc. | 1975 | |
| Chariot Lords | Clash of Arms | 1999 | |
| Commands & Colors: Ancients | GMT Games | 2006 | |
| Conquest of the Empire | Citadel Games | 1981? | Re-released by Milton Bradley in 1984 and by Eagle Games in 2005 |
| The Conquerors | Simulations Publications, Inc. | 1977 | |
| The Conquerors: Alexander the Great | GMT Games | 2006 | |
| Day of the Chariot: Kadesh | LPS, Inc. | 2008 | AtO No. 21 |
| Eagles | Game Designers' Workshop | 1973 | |
| Caesar's Legions | Avalon Hill | 1975 | |
| Emperor of China (game) | Dynamic Games | 1972 | |
| Epic of the Peloponnesian War | Clash of Arms | 2006 | |
| Fading Legions | Avalanche Press | 2002 | |
| Gladiator | Avalon Hill | 1981 | |
| Go Tell the Spartans | LPS, Inc. | 2003 | AtO No. 6 |
| The Great Battles of Alexander the Great | GMT Games | 1991 | Deluxe Edition released in 1995 |
| Hannibal | Histo Games | 1969 | |
| Hannibal | Aulic Council | 1983 | |
| Hannibal: Rome vs. Carthage | Avalon Hill | 1996 | Re-released by Valley Games in 2007 |
| Hannibal: The Italian Campaign 219-206 BC | Simulations Canada | 1983 | |
| Hannibal: The Second Punic War | Decision Games | 1991 | S&T No. 141 |
| Hannibal at Bay | Avalanche Press | 2000 | |
| Hegemon | LPS, Inc. | 2002 | AtO No. 1 |
| Hellenes: Campaigns of the Peloponnesian War | GMT Games | 2009 | |
| I am Spartacus | XTR Corp | 1992 | Command No. 15 |
| Iliad: The Siege of Troy | Conflict Games | | Re-released by Game Designers' Workshop in 1978 |
| Imperial Governor & Strategos | Ariel Productions Ltd, Philmar | 1979 | |
| Jewish War | Khyber Pass Games | 2000 | |
| Kadesh | XTR Corp | 1991 | Command No. 7 |
| Legion | Simulations Publications, Inc. | 1975 | |
| Pax Romana | GMT Games | 2006 | |
| The Peloponnesian War | Simulations Canada | 1977 | |
| The Peloponnesian War | Victory Games | 1991 | |
| Phalanx | Simulations Publications, Inc. | 1971 | |
| Phalanx | Society of Ancients | 1993 | Slingshot No. 165 |
| The Republic of Rome | Valley Games | 1990 | |
| Queen of the Celts | Avalanche Press | 2007 | |
| Spartan | Simulations Publications, Inc. | 1975 | |
| SPQR | GMT Games | 1992 | Oriflam (in French) |
| Successors | Decision Games | 1993 | S&T No. 161 |
| Successors | Avalon Hill | 1997 | Re-released by GMT Games in 2008 |
| The Sword of Rome | GMT Games | 2004 | |
| Trireme | Battleline Publications | 1979 | Re-released by Avalon Hill in 1980 |
| Troy | Chaosium | 1977 | |
| Tyre | Simulations Publications, Inc. | 1978 | |
| War Galley | GMT Games | 1997 | |
| Xenophon: 10,000 Against Persia | Decision Games | 2000 | S&T No. 203 |

=== Early Middle Ages ===
| Name | Publisher | Year | Notes |
|---|---|---|---|
| Barbarian Kingdoms | Jester Games | 2024 | |
| Belisarius: The Byzantine Empire Strikes | Decision Games | 2002 | S&T No. 210, 2002 |
| Byzantium | Warfrog | 2005 | |
| Dark Ages: Tactical Warfare, 500-1300 | Simulations Publications, Inc. | 1971 | |
| Norseman: Viking Kingdoms of the North Sea | Simulations Canada | 1985 | |
| Siege!: The Game of Siege Warfare, 50 AD-1400 AD | Fact and Fantasy Games | 1974 | |
| Viking | Simulations Publications, Inc. | 1975 | |
| Viking Raiders | Standard Games | 1987 | Also released by Eurogames in French |
| Vikingatid | Trollspel | 1998 | In Swedish |

=== Middle Ages ===
| Name | Publisher | Year | Notes |
|---|---|---|---|
| Agincourt | Simulations Publications, Inc. | 1978 | |
| The Black Prince: The Battle of Navarette, 1367 | Simulations Publications, Inc. | 1979 | |
| Conquistador | Simulations Publications, Inc. | 1976 | S&T No. 58, 1976, Avalon Hill, 1983) |
| Cry Havoc | Standard Games | 1981 | |
| The Crusades | Simulations Publications, Inc. | 1978 | S&T No. 70, 1978 |
| Empires of the Middle Ages | Simulations Publications, Inc. | 1980 | Re-released by Decision Games c. 2004 |
| Granada: The Fall of Moslem Spain | Avalanche Press | 2003 | |
| The Golden Horde | Excalibre Games | 1978 | |
| Hammer of the Scots | Columbia Games | 2003 | |
| The Legend of Robin Hood | Operational Studies Group | 1979 | Re-released by Avalon Hill in 1980 |
| Scotland the Brave | Avalanche Press | 1998 | |
| Renaissance of Infantry | Simulations Publications, Inc. | 1970 | S&T No. 22, 1970 |
| Yeoman | Simulations Publications, Inc. | 1975 | |

=== Early modern ===
| Name | Publisher | Year | Notes |
|---|---|---|---|
| 1776 | Avalon Hill | 1974 | |
| The Alamo | Simulations Publications, Inc. | 1981 | Re-released by Decision Games |
| Alma | Simulations Publications, Inc. | 1978 | |
| The American Revolution 1775–1783 | Simulations Publications, Inc. | 1972 | |
| Arcola | Operational Studies Group | 1979 | Re-released as Battle for Italy by Avalon Hill in 1981 |
| Armada: The War With Spain 1585–1604 | Simulations Publications, Inc. | 1979 | S&T No. 72, 1979 |
| Balaclava | Simulations Publications, Inc. | 1978 | |
| Battle of Guilford Courthouse | Game Designers' Workshop | 1978 | |
| The Battle of Lobositz | Game Designers' Workshop | 1978 | |
| The Battle of Saratoga | Oldenburg Grenadiers | 1976 | |
| The Battle of the Alma | Game Designers' Workshop | 1978 | Re-released by Kokusai-Tsushin in Japanese (2001); Command No. 38, 2001 |
| Breitenfeld | Simulations Publications, Inc. | 1976 | S&T No. 55, 1976 |
| The Campaigns of Frederick the Great | 3W | 1993 | |
| La Carga de la Brigada Ligera | NAC | 1987 | In English |
| Close Action | Clash of Arms | 1997 | |
| Crimean War Battles | Simulations Publications, Inc. | 1978 | Re-released by Decision Games in 2000; S&T No. 201, 2000 |
| The English Civil War | Ariel Productions Ltd, Ironside Games, Philmar | 1978 | |
| Fighting Sail: Sea Combat in the Age of Canvas and Shot 1775–1815 | Simulations Publications, Inc. | 1981 | S&T No. 85, 1981 |
| Fontenoy 1745 | Vae Victis | 1996 | |
| Frederick the Great | Simulations Publications, Inc. | 1975 | S&T No. 49, 1975; re-released by Avalon Hill in 1982 |
| Friedrich | Histogame | 2004 | In German; re-released by Simmons Games in 2005 |
| Frigate: Sea War in the Age of Sail | Simulations Publications, Inc. | 1974 | |
| Geronimo | Avalon Hill | 1995 | |
| Gunslinger | Avalon Hill | 1982 | |
| Kingmaker | PhilMar Ltd. | 1974 | Re-released by Avalon Hill in 1976 |
| Kolin 1757: Frederick's First Defeat | Clash of Arms | 1994 | |
| Leuthen: Frederick's Greatest Victory | Clash of Arms | 1997 | |
| Machiavelli | Battleline Publications | 1977 | Re-released by Avalon Hill in 1983 |
| A Mighty Fortress | Simulations Publications, Inc. | 1977 | |
| Musket & Pike | Simulations Publications, Inc. | 1973 | |
| Quebec 1759 | Gamma Two Games | 1972 | Re-released by Avalon Hill, c. 1977, and by Columbia Games |
| Samurai | Battleline Publications | 1979 | Re-released by Avalon Hill in 1980 |
| Saratoga | GMT Games | 1998 | |
| Saratoga 1777 | Rand Game Associates | 1974 | Re-released by Gamut of Games |
| Shogun | Milton Bradley | 1986 | Re-released as Samurai Swords by Milton Bradley in 1995 |
| Shogun | Queen Games | 2006 | |
| The Siege of Constantinople | Simulations Publications, Inc. | 1978 | S&T No. 66, 1978 |
| Soldier Kings | Avalanche Press | 2002 | |
| Soldier Raj | Avalanche Press | 2004 | |
| Thirty Years War: Europe in Agony, 1618–1648 | GMT Games | 2001 | |
| Wallenstein | Queen Games | 2002 | |
| War of 1812 | Gamma Two Games | 1973 | Re-released by Avalon Hill c. 1977 and by Columbia Games |
| Washington's War | GMT Games | 2010 | |
| Wooden Ships and Iron Men | Battleline Publications | 1974 | Re-released by Avalon Hill in 1975 |
| We the People | Avalon Hill | 1994 | |

=== Napoleonic era ===
| Name | Publisher | Year | Notes |
|---|---|---|---|
| Game of War | Guy Debord | 1965 | |
| 1809: Napoleon's Danube Campaign | Victory Games | 1984 | |
| 1812: The Campaign of Napoleon in Russia | Simulations Publications, Inc. | 1972 | |
| 1815: The Waterloo Campaign | Game Designers' Workshop | 1982 | |
| Austerlitz: Battle of the Three Emperors | Simulations Publications, Inc. | 1973 | |
| Austerlitz 1805: Le choc des cavaleries | Vae Victis | 1995 | |
| La Bataille d'Albuera-Espagnol | Clash of Arms | 1984 | |
| La Bataille d'Auerstaedt | Marshal Enterprises | 1978 | Re-released by Clash of Arms in 1991 and by AGEMA in German in 1977 |
| La Bataille d'Austerlitz | Marshal Enterprises | 1980 | |
| La Bataille d'Espagnol-Talavera | Marshal Enterprises | 1979 | Re-released by Clash of Arms in 1995 |
| La Bataille d'Orthez | Clash of Arms | 2000 | |
| La Bataille de Corunna-Espagnol | Clash of Arms | 1995 | |
| La Bataille de Deutsch Wagram | Marshal Enterprises | 1981 | |
| La Bataille de la Moscowa | Marshal Enterprises | 1975 | Re-released by Game Designers' Workshop in 1977 and by Clash of Arms in 2011) |
| La Bataille de Ligny | Clash of Arms | 1991 | |
| La Bataille de Lützen | Clash of Arms | 1999 | |
| La Bataille de Mont Saint Jean | Clash of Arms | 1993 | |
| La Bataille de Preusisch Eylau | Marshal Enterprises | 1978 | Re-released by Clash of Arms in 1990) |
| La Bataille des Quatre bras | Clash of Arms | 1991 | |
| La Bataille de Dresde | Clash of Arms | 2015 | |
| Battles of the Hundred Days | Operational Studies Group | 1979 | Re-released as Hundred Days Battles by Avalon Hill in 1983 |
| Bonaparte at Marengo | Simmons Games | 2005 | |
| Borodino: Napoleon in Russia | Simulations Publications, Inc. | 1972 | S&T No. 32, 1972 |
| Dresden | Simulations Publications, Inc. | 1979 | S&T No. 75, 1979 |
| Empires in Arms | Australian Design Group | 1983 | Re-released by Avalon Hill in 1985 |
| Eylau: Napoleon's Winter Battle, 1807 | Game Designers' Workshop | 1980 | |
| Friedland 1807 | Imperial Games | 1974 | |
| La Patrie en Danger | Operational Studies Group | 2014 | |
| Napoleon | Gamma Two Games | 1974 | Re-released by Avalon Hill in 1977 and by Columbia Games |
| Napoleon Against Russia | Operational Studies Group | 2015 | |
| Napoleon at Bay | Avalon Hill | 1983 | |
| Napoleon at Leipzig | Operational Studies Group | 1979 | Re-released by Clash of Arms in 1988 and in 2013 |
| Napoleon at War: Four Battles | Simulations Publications, Inc. | 1975 | |
| Napoleon at Waterloo | Simulations Publications, Inc. | 1971 | |
| Napoleon in Europe | Eagle Games | 2001 | |
| Napoleon in the Desert | Avalanche Press | 2002 | |
| Napoleon on the Danube | Avalanche Press | 2005 | |
| Napoleon Retreats | Operational Studies Group | 2019 | |
| Napoleon's Art of War | Simulations Publications, Inc. | 1979 | S&T No. 75, 1979 |
| Napoleon's Last Battles | Simulations Publications, Inc. | 1976 | Re-released by TSR, Inc. in 1984 |
| Napoleon's Last Gamble | Operational Studies Group | 2016 | |
| Napoleon's Quagmire | Operational Studies Group | 2017 | |
| Napoleon's Resurgence | Operational Studies Group | 2018 | |
| Ney vs. Wellington | Simulations Publications, Inc. | 1979 | S&T No. 74, 1979 |
| Preussisch-Eylau | Avalanche Press | 1999 | |
| Salamanca | Maplay Games | 1976 | |
| Soldier Emperor | Avalanche Press | 2003 | |
| The Struggle of Nations | Avalon Hill | 1982 | |
| The Coming Storm | Operational Studies Group | 2010 | |
| The Last Success | Operational Studies Group | 2012 | |
| Toulon, 1793 | Legion Wargames | 2014 | |
| Wagram 1809 | Mazas Edition | 1985 | |
| War and Peace | Avalon Hill | 1980 | |
| Waterloo | Avalon Hill | 1962 | |
| Wellington | GMT Games | 2005 | |
| Wellington's Victory: Battle of Waterloo | Simulations Publications, Inc. | 1976 | Re-released by TSR, Inc. in 1983 |

=== American Civil War ===
==== Skirmish ====
| Name | Publisher | Year | Notes |
|---|---|---|---|
| Devil's Den | Operational Studies Group | 1980 | Re-released by Avalon Hill in 1985 |

==== Tactical ====
| Name | Publisher | Year | Notes | | | | |
|---|---|---|---|---|---|---|---|
| Antietam: The Bloodiest Day | Simulations Publications, Inc. | 1975 | | | | | |
| Battle Cry | Avalon Hill | 2000 | | | | | |
| The Battles of Bull Run | Simulations Publications, Inc. | 1973 | | | | | |
| Blue and Gray | Simulations Publications, Inc. | 1975 | Re-released by TSR, Inc. in 1983, by Overlord Games, and by Decision Games in 1995 | | | | |
| Blue and Gray II | Simulations Publications, Inc. | 1976 | | | | | |
| Cedar Mountain: The Prelude to Bull Run | Simulations Publications, Inc. | 1981 | S&T No. 86, 1981 | | | | |
| Cemetery Hill | Simulations Publications, Inc. | 1975 | | | | | |
| Chancellorsville | Avalon Hill | 1961 | | | | | |
| Chickamauga & Chattanooga | Avalanche Press | 2003 | | | | | |
| Fury in the West | Battleline Publications | 1977 | Re-released by Avalon Hill in 1979 | | | | |
| Gettysburg | Avalon Hill | 1958 | | | | | |
| Gettysburg 1863 | Avalanche Press | 2002 | | | | | |
| Lee vs. Meade: The Battle of Gettysburg | Rand Game Associates | 1974 | Re-released by Gamut of Games | | | | |
| Rifle-Musket | Simulations Design Corporation | 1974 | | | | | |
| Seven Days Battles | Battleline Publications | 1973 | - | Stonewall: The Battle of Kernstown | Simulations Publications, Inc. | 1978 | S&T No. 67, 1978 |
| Thunder on South Mountain | Blue Guidon | 2000 | | | | | |

==== Grand Tactical ====
| Name | Publisher | Year | Notes |
|---|---|---|---|
| Bloody April: The Battle of Shiloh, 1862 | Simulations Publications, Inc. | 1979 | |
| Terrible Swift Sword | Simulations Publications, Inc. | 1976 | Re-released by TSR, Inc. in 1986 |

==== Operational ====
| Name | Publisher | Year | Notes |
|---|---|---|---|
| Atlanta | Guidon Games | 1973 | |
| Bloodiest Day: The Battle of Antietam September 17, 1862 | Spearhead Games | 1995 | |
| Drive on Washington | Simulations Publications, Inc. | 1980 | |
| Lee vs. Grant | Victory Games | 1988 | Wilderness Campaign, an ancestor of the Avalon Hill "Stonewall Jackson's Way" series |
| Mosby's Raiders | Victory Games | 1985 | |
| Objective: Atlanta | Battleline Publications | 1977 | |
| Shenandoah | Battleline Publications | 1975 | |
| Stonewall Jackson's Way | Avalon Hill | 1992 | Cedar Mountain to Second Bull Run |
| Here Come the Rebels | Avalon Hill | 1993 | Re-released by Multi-Man Publishing; Antietam Campaign |
| Roads to Gettysburg | Avalon Hill | 1993 | Re-released by Multi-Man Publishing; Gettysburg Campaign |
| Stonewall in the Valley | Avalon Hill | 1995 | Shenandoah Campaign |
| Stonewall's Last Battle | Avalon Hill | 1996 | Chancellorsville Campaign |
| On To Richmond | Avalon Hill | 1997 | Re-released by Multi-Man Publishing; McClellan's Peninsula Campaign |
| Grant Takes Command | Avalon Hill | 2001 | Wilderness Campaign |
| Battle Above the Clouds | Multi-Man Publishing | 2011 | Chickamauga/Chattanooga |

==== Strategic ====
| Name | Publisher | Year | Notes |
|---|---|---|---|
| Bobby Lee | Columbia Games | 1993 | |
| Sam Grant | Columbia Games | 1997 | |

==== Grand Strategy ====
| Name | Publisher | Year | Notes |
|---|---|---|---|
| The American Civil War 1861–1865 | Simulations Publications, Inc. | 1974 | S&T No. 43, 1974 |
| The American Civil War 1861–1865 | TSR, Inc. | 1983 | S&T No. 93, 1983 |
| Battle Cry | Milton Bradley | 1961 | |
| Civil War | Avalon Hill | 1961 | |
| The Civil War 1861–1865 | Victory Games | 1983 | |
| A House Divided | Game Designers' Workshop | 1981 | Re-released by Phalanx Games in 2001 |
| For the People | Avalon Hill | 1998 | Re-released in GMT Games in 2000 |
| The U.S. Civil War | GMT Games | 2015 | |
| War Between the States | Simulations Publications, Inc. | 1978 | |

=== 19th Century/Industrial warfare ===
| Name | Publisher | Year | Notes |
|---|---|---|---|
| Diplomacy | Self-published | 1959 | Re-released by Games Research in 1961 and by Avalon Hill in 1976 |
| 1898: The Spanish–American War | Avalanche Press | 2000 | |
| 1904–1905: The Russo-Japanese War | Avalanche Press | 1999 | |
| Chaco | Game Designers' Workshop | 1973 | |
| Custer's Last Stand | Battleline Publications | 1976 | |
| Like Lions They Fought | XTR Corp | 1994 | |
| Pax Britannica | Victory Games | 1985 | |
| Red Sun Rising | Simulations Publications, Inc. | 1977 | |
| Rifle & Saber | Simulations Publications, Inc. | 1973 | |
| Sadowa | Fusilier Games | 1977 | |
| Tatchanka | Jim Bumpas | 1977 | |
| Viva España | Battleline Publications | 1977 | |
| Viva Zapata! | Editions du Stratège | 1982 | |

=== World War I ===
| Name | Publisher | Year | Notes |
|---|---|---|---|
| 1914 | Avalon Hill | 1968 | |
| 1918 | Simulations Publications, Inc. | 1970 | |
| Aces High | World Wide Wargames | | |
| Blue Max | Game Designers' Workshop | 1983 | Re-released as Les Ailes de la Gloire in French by Oriflam |
| Brusilov Offensive | Simulations Publications, Inc. | 1978 | |
| Cruiser Warfare | Avalanche Press | 2004 | |
| Fatal Alliances: The Great War | Compass Games | 2016 | |
| Fight in the Skies | Guidon Games | 1972 | Re-released by TSR in 1975) and as Dawn Patrol by TSR in 1982 |
| Flying Circus | Simulations Publications, Inc. | 1972 | |
| Great War at Sea: The Mediterranean | Avalanche Press | 1996 | |
| Great War at Sea: The North and Baltic Seas | Avalanche Press | 1998 | Re-released as Jutland |
| The Guns of August | Avalon Hill | 1981 | |
| Infantry Attacks: Imperial Twilight | Avalanche Press | 2006 | |
| Jutland | Avalon Hill | 1967 | |
| The Kaiser's Battle | Simulations Publications, Inc. | 1980 | S&T No. 83, 1980; re-released by Decision Games |
| Knights of the Air | Avalon Hill | 1987 | |
| Paths of Glory | GMT Games | 1999 | |
| Pursuit of Glory | GMT Games | 2008 | |
| The Marne: Home Before the Leaves Fall | Simulations Publications, Inc. | 1972 | |
| Micro Fleet: World War I | Tabletop Games | 1976 | |
| Richthofen's War | Avalon Hill | 1972 | |
| Soldiers | Simulations Publications, Inc. | 1972 | |
| Sopwith | Gametime Games | 1978 | |
| The Strand War Game | The Strand Magazine | 1915 | |
| They Shall Not Pass: The Battle of Verdun, 1916 | Avalanche Press | 2006 | |
| To the Green Fields Beyond | Simulations Publications, Inc. | 1978 | |
| Trenchfoot: Bullets & Bayonets in the Great War | Game Designers' Workshop | 1981 | |
| Verdun | Conflict Games | 1972 | Re-released by Game Designers' Workshop in 1978 |
| Verdun 1916 | Histoire & Collections | 2002 | Vae Victis No. 46, 2002 in French |
| Wings | Yaquinto Publications | 1981 | Re-released by Excalibre Games in 1993 |
| World War I | Simulations Publications, Inc. | 1975 | S&T No. 51, 1975; re-released by Excalibre Games and by Decision Games in 1994 |

=== World War II ===
==== Tactical wargames ====
| Name | Publisher | Year | Notes |
|---|---|---|---|
| B-17, Queen of the Skies | Avalon Hill | 1983 | |
| Advanced Squad Leader | Avalon Hill | 1985 | Re-released by Multi-Man Publishing in 2001 |
| Ambush! | Victory Games | 1983 | |
| Commando | Simulations Publications, Inc. | 1979 | |
| Conflict of Heroes | Academy Games | 2008 | |
| Dreadnought: Surface Combat In The Battleship Era, 1906–45 | Simulations Publications, Inc. | 1975 | |
| Memoir '44 | Days of Wonder | 2004 | |
| Panzer 44 | Simulations Publications, Inc. | 1975 | |
| Panzer Leader | Avalon Hill | 1974 | |
| PanzerBlitz | Avalon Hill | 1970 | |
| Patton's Best | Avalon Hill | 1987 | |
| Ring of Fire: The Fourth Battle for Kharkov, August 1943 | Moments in History | 1994 | |
| Sniper | Simulations Publications, Inc. | 1973 | |
| Soldiers: Man-to-Man Combat in World War II | West End Games | 1987 | |
| Squad Leader | Avalon Hill | 1977 | |
| Storm Over Arnhem | | 1982 | |
| Tank Battle | Milton Bradley | 1975 | |
| Tide of Iron | Fantasy Flight Games | 2007 | Re-printed by 1A Games in 2014 |
| Tobruk | Avalon Hill | 1975 | |
| U-Boat | Tabletop Games | 1977 | |
| Onslaught | TSR, Inc. | 1987 | |

==== Operational ====
===== European Theatre =====
| Name | Publisher | Year | Notes |
|---|---|---|---|
| EuroFront | Columbia Games | 1995 | |
| Triumph and Tragedy | GMT Games | 2015 | |

====== Eastern Front ======
| Name | Publisher | Year | Notes |
|---|---|---|---|
| EastFront | Columbia Games | 1991 | |
| Evropa | Game Designers' Workshop | 1973 | Re-released as Fire in the East by Game Designers' Workshop in 1984 |
| Micro Modern World War 2 | Tabletop Games | 1976 | |
| The Siege of Leningrad | JagdPanther Publications | 1976 | |
| Turning Point: Stalingrad | Avalon Hill | 1989 | |
| Von Manstein: Battles for the Ukraine 1941–1944 | Rand Games | 1975 | |
| War in the East | Simulations Publications, Inc. | 1974 | |
| Wehrmacht | Fusilier Games | 1977 | |
| Winter War | Ad Technos | 1986 | In Japanese |
| Winter War: The Russo-Finnish Conflict November 1939 – March 1940 | Simulations Publications, Inc. | 1972 | S&T No. 33, 1972 |
| A Winter War | Game Research/Design | 1994 | |

====== Western Front ======
| Name | Publisher | Year | Notes |
|---|---|---|---|
| Alsace 1945 | Avalanche Press | 2005 | |
| America Triumphant: Battle of the Bulge | Avalanche Press | 2003 | |
| Anzio | Avalon Hill | 1969 | |
| Anzio Beachhead | Simulations Publications, Inc. | 1969 | S&T No. 20, 1969; re-released by 3W in 1990 – S&T No. 134, 1990 |
| The Ardennes Offensive | Simulations Publications, Inc. | 1973 | |
| Arnhem | Panzerfaust Publications | 1972 | Panzerfaust #?, 1972 |
| Arnhem | Simulations Publications, Inc. | 1976 | |
| Arnhem 1944 | Histoire & Collections | 1997 | Vae Victis No. 13, 1997; in French |
| Arnhem and Operation Market-Garden | Spartan International | 1971 | Spartan International Vol 3. No. 5, 1971 |
| Arnhem Bridge | Attactix Adventure Games | 1982 | |
| Atlantic Wall | Simulations Publications, Inc. | 1978 | |
| Avalanche: The Invasion of Italy | Avalanche Press | 1994 | |
| Avalanche: The Salerno Landings | Game Designers' Workshop | 1976 | |
| Axis & Allies: D-Day | Avalon Hill | 2004 | |
| Bastogne | Simulations Publications, Inc. | 1969 | S&T No. 20, 1969 |
| Bastogne or Bust | Terran Games | 1995 | |
| Bastogne: The Desperate Defense, December 1944 | Simulations Publications, Inc. | 1976 | Re-released by Fresno Gaming Association in 1992 |
| Bastogne: Crossroads of Death | Pacific Rim Publishing | 1991 | |
| Battle for the Ardennes | Simulations Publications, Inc. | 1978 | |
| Battle of the Bulge | Avalon Hill | 1965 | |
| The Big Red One | Simulations Publications, Inc. | 1980 | |
| Bitter Woods: The Battle of the Bulge | Avalon Hill | 1998 | Re-released by Multi-Man Publishing and by L2 Design Group in 2003 |
| Breakout & Pursuit | Simulations Publications, Inc. | 1972 | |
| Breakout: Normandy | Avalon Hill | 1993 | |
| 'Bulge': The Battle for the Ardennes | Simulations Publications, Inc. | 1980 | |
| Cobra | Simulations Publications, Inc. | 1977 | S&T No. 65, 1977; re-released by TSR, Inc. in 1984 |
| D-Day: The Great Crusade | Moments in History | 2004 | |
| Dark December | Operational Studies Group | 1979 | |
| Fight for the Sky | Attactix Adventure Games | 1982 | |
| France 1944 | Victory Games | 1986 | |
| Foxhole | Diffraction Entertainment, Ltd. | 2010 | |
| Hell's Highway | Victory Games | 1983 | |
| Highway to the Reich | Simulations Publications, Inc. | 1977 | |
| The Italian Campaign: Salerno | Decision Games | 1992 | S&T No. 150, 1992 |
| Liberty Roads | Hexasim | 2009 | |
| The Longest Day | Avalon Hill | 1980 | |
| The Major Battles and Campaigns of General George S. Patton | Research Games | 1973 | |
| Memoir '44 | Days of Wonder | 2004 | |
| Monty's Gamble: Market Garden | Multi-Man Publishing | 2003 | |
| Normandy: The Invasion of Europe 1944 | Simulations Publications, Inc. | 1969 | |
| Normandy Campaign: From Beachhead to Breakout | Game Designers' Workshop | 1983 | |
| Omaha Beachhead | Victory Games | 1987 | |
| Operation Grenade | Simulations Publications, Inc. | 1981 | S&T No. 84, 1981 |
| Operation Market-Garden | Third Millennia | 1973 | |
| Operation Market-Garden: Descent into Hell | Game Designers' Workshop | 1985 | |
| Overlord | Conflict Games | 1973 | Re-released by Game Designers' Workshop |
| Patton's Third Army | Simulations Publications, Inc. | 1980 | S&T No. 78, 1980; re-released by Hobby Japan in Japanese |
| Piercing the Reich | Moments in History | 1995 | |
| Salerno | Third Millennia | 1972 | |
| Salerno: Operation Avalanche | West End Games | 1977 | |
| Second Front | Game Research/Design | 1994 | |
| Wacht am Rhein | Simulations Publications, Inc. | 1976 | |
| War in the West | Simulations Publications, Inc. | 1976 | |
| WestFront | Columbia Games | 1992 | |

====== Other campaigns ======
| Name | Publisher | Year | Notes |
|---|---|---|---|
| 1940 | Game Designers' Workshop | 1980 | |
| Battle for Germany | Simulations Publications, Inc. | 1975 | S&T No. 50, 1975; re-released by Decision Games by 1994 |
| The Battle of Britain | Gamescience | 1968 | |
| Battle of the Atlantic | Taurus Games | 1975 | |
| Battle with the Graf Spee | SoPac Games | 1977 | |
| Bismarck | Avalanche Press | 2005 | |
| Bitter Victory: The Invasion of Sicily, 1943 | Avalanche Press | 2006 | |
| Case White | Game Designers' Workshop | 1977 | Re-released as First to Fight by Game Research/Design in 1991 |
| Dunkirk: The Battle of France | Guidon Games | 1971 | |
| Eagle Day | Histo Games | 1973 | |
| The Fall of France | Game Designers' Workshop | 1981 | |
| France 1940 | Simulations Publications, Inc. | 1971 | S&T No. 27, 1971; re-released by Avalon Hill in 1972 |
| Invasion of Sicily | Panzerfaust Publications | 1972 | Panzerfaust Magazine #57?, 1972 |
| London's Burning | Avalon Hill | 1995 | |
| Marita-Merkur | Game Designers' Workshop | 1979 | Re-released as Balkan Front by Game Research/Design in 1990 |
| Narvik: The Campaign in Norway, 1940 | Game Designers' Workshop | 1974 | Re-released as Storm Over Scandinavia by Game Research/Design in 1998 |
| Poland, 1939 | Panzerfaust Publications | 1971 | Panzerfaust No. 49. Three new editions revised and re-published by JagdPanther Publications in 1973, 1974, and 1975 |
| Raiders of the North | Taurus Games | 1975 | |
| Strange Defeat: The Fall of France, 1940 | Avalanche Press | 2006 | |
| Their Finest Hour | Game Designers' Workshop | 1976 | |

===== Mediterranean Theatre and North African campaign =====
| Name | Publisher | Year | Notes |
|---|---|---|---|
| The African Campaign | Jedko Games | 1973 | |
| Air Assault on Crete | Avalon Hill | 1977 | |
| Bloody Kasserine | Game Designers' Workshop | 1992 | |
| Bomb Alley | Avalanche Press | 2002 | |
| The Campaign for North Africa | Simulations Publications, Inc. | 1978 | |
| Crete | Simulations Publications, Inc. | 1969 | S&T No. 18, 1969 |
| Crete 1941 | Excalibre Games | 1976 | S&T No. 18, 1969 |
| Descent on Crete | Simulations Publications, Inc. | 1978 | |
| The Desert Fox | Simulations Publications, Inc. | 1981 | S&T No. 87, 1981 |
| El Alamein: Battles in North Africa | Simulations Publications, Inc. | 1973 | |
| Fall of Tobruk | Conflict Games | 1975 | Re-released by Cool Stuff Unlimited in 2004 |
| Gazala: 1942 | Avalanche Press | 2002 | |
| Island of Death: The Invasion of Malta, 1942 | Avalanche Press | 2006 | |
| Kasserine | GMT Games | 2001 | |
| Kasserine Pass | Conflict Games | 1973 | Re-released by Game Designers' Workshop |
| Operation Crusader | Game Designers' Workshop | 1978 | |
| Panzer Armee Afrika | Simulations Publications, Inc. | 1973 | Re-released by Avalon Hill in 1982 |
| Race for Tunis | Game Designers' Workshop | 1992 | |
| Rommel: The Campaign for North Africa | Loren Sperry | 1973 | |
| Rommel in the Desert | Columbia Games | 1982 | |
| Torch | Game Designers' Workshop | 1985 | |
| Western Desert | Game Designers' Workshop | 1982 | Re-released as War in the Desert by Game Research/Design in 1995) |

===== Pacific and Asia =====
| Name | Publisher | Year | Notes |
|---|---|---|---|
| 1942 | Game Designers' Workshop | 1978 | |
| Battle for Midway | Game Designers' Workshop | 1976 | |
| Carrier | Victory Games | 1990 | |
| Coral Sea | Game Designers' Workshop | 1974 | |
| Eastern Fleet | Avalanche Press | 2001 | |
| The Fast Carriers | Simulations Publications, Inc. | 1976 | |
| Flat Top | Battleline Publications | 1977 | Re-released by Avalon Hill in 1981 |
| Guadalcanal | Avalon Hill | 1966 | |
| Guadalcanal | Avalon Hill | 1992 | |
| Indian Ocean Adventure | Game Designers' Workshop | 1978 | |
| Leyte Gulf | Avalanche Press | 2005 | |
| McArthur's Return: Leyte 1944 | Avalanche Press | 1994 | |
| Midway | Avalon Hill | 1964 | |
| Midway | Sho-Kikaku | 1986 | In Japanese |
| Midway | Avalon Hill | 1991 | |
| Midway | Avalanche Press | 2002 | |
| Operation Cannibal | Avalanche Press | 1996 | |
| Operation Olympic | Simulations Publications, Inc. | 1974 | S&T No. 45, 1974 |
| Santa Cruz | SoPac Games | 1976 | |
| SOPAC | Avalanche Press | 1999 | |
| Strike South | Avalanche Press | 2005 | |
| War in the Pacific: The Campaign Against Imperial Japan, 1941–45 | Simulations Publications, Inc. | 1978 | |
| War in the Pacific | Decision Games | 2006 | |
| War of Resistance, China Theater 1937–1941 | Game Research/Design | 1998 | |

==== Strategic ====
===== Europe =====
| Name | Publisher | Year | Notes |
|---|---|---|---|
| Trial of Strength | Panther Games | 1985 | |
| Advanced Third Reich | Avalon Hill | 1992 | |
| Axis & Allies: Europe | Avalon Hill | 2000 | |
| D-Day | Avalon Hill | 1961 | |
| Defiant Russia: 1941 | Avalanche Press | 2004 | |
| Europe Engulfed | GMT Games | 2002 | Winner of the Charles S. Roberts Award |
| Fortress Europa | Avalon Hill | 1980 | |
| Hitler's War | Metagaming Concepts | 1981 | Re-released by Avalon Hill in 1984 |
| Luftwaffe | Avalon Hill | 1971 | |
| Red Vengeance | Avalanche Press | 2005 | |
| Rise and Decline of the Third Reich | Avalon Hill | 1974 | Re-released by Avalanche Press in 2001 |
| Russia Besieged | L2 Design Group | 2004 | |
| The Russian Campaign | Jedko Games | 1975 | Re-released by Avalon Hill in 1976 and by L2 Design Group in 2003 |
| Russian Front | Avalon Hill | 1985 | |
| Stalingrad | Avalon Hill | 1963 | |
| Unconditional Surrender! World War 2 in Europe | GMT Games | 2014 | |
| War at Sea | Jedko Games | 1975 | Re-released by Avalon Hill in 1976 and by L2 Design Group in 2007 |
| War in Europe | Simulations Publications, Inc. | 1976 | Re-released by Decision Games in 1999 |
| World War II: European Theater of Operations | Simulations Publications, Inc. | 1973 | |

===== Mediterranean and north Africa =====
| Name | Publisher | Year | Notes |
|---|---|---|---|
| Afrika Korps | Avalon Hill | 1964 | |

===== Pacific =====
| Name | Publisher | Year | Notes |
|---|---|---|---|
| Axis & Allies: Pacific | Avalon Hill | 2001 | |
| Empire of the Rising Sun | Avalon Hill | 1995 | |
| The Great Pacific War | Avalanche Press | 2003 | |
| Pacific War | Victory Games | 1985 | |
| U.S.N. | Simulations Publications, Inc. | 1971 | S&T No. 29, 1971 |
| Victory in the Pacific | Avalon Hill | 1977 | |
| War in the Pacific | Simulations Publications, Inc. | 1978 | |

==== Grand Strategy (Global) ====
| Name | Publisher | Year | Notes |
|---|---|---|---|
| Axis & Allies | Nova Games | 1981 | Re-released by Milton Bradley in 1984 and by Avalon Hill in 2004 |
| Global War | Simulations Publications, Inc. | 1975 | |
| World in Flames | Australian Design Group | 1985 | |

=== Modern ===
| Name | Publisher | Year | Notes |
|---|---|---|---|
| Africa | UKW | 1977 | |
| Bay of Pigs | | 1976 | |
| Central America: The United States' Backyard War | Victory Games | 1987 | |
| Hegemony: A Game of Strategic Choices | Rand Corporation | 2020 | |
| Ici, c'est la France!: The Algerian insurgency 1954–62 | Legion Wargames | 2009 | |
| Twilight Struggle | GMT Games | 2005 | |
| War on Terror | TerrorBull Games | 2006 | |

==== Tactical ====
| Name | Publisher | Year | Notes |
|---|---|---|---|
| Air Superiority | Game Designers' Workshop | 1987 | |
| Air War | Simulations Publications, Inc. | 1977 | Re-released by TSR, Inc. in 1983 |
| Chicago, Chicago! | Simulations Publications, Inc. | 1970 | S&T No. 21, 1970 |
| City-Fight | Simulations Publications, Inc. | 1979 | |
| Flight Leader | Avalon Hill | 1986 | |
| MechWar 2 | Simulations Publications, Inc. | 1979 | |
| Omaha Beach | Rand Game Associates | 1974 | |
| Marine! | JagdPanther Publications | 1975 | Released in JagdPanther #10 |
| Patrol! | Simulations Publications, Inc. | 1975 | |
| Raid: Commando Operations in the 20th Century | Simulations Publications, Inc. | 1977 | S&T No. 64, 1977 |
| Ranger | Omega Games | 1984 | |
| The Sands of War | Game Designers' Workshop | 1991 | |
| Sniper! | Simulations Publications, Inc. | 1973 | Re-released by TSR, Inc. in 1986 |
| Sniper!: Special Forces | TSR, Inc. | 1988 | |
| Tank! | Simulations Publications, Inc. | 1974 | S&T No. 44, 1974 |
| Warfighter 101: Movement to Contact | BayonetGames | 2005 | |
| Warfighter 101: The Guards | BayonetGames | 2006 | |
| Warfighter Series: Maneuver Warrior | BayonetGames | 2006 | |

==== Arab–Israeli wars ====
| Name | Publisher | Year | Notes |
|---|---|---|---|
| A Guerra do Yom Kippur | Abril Editora | 1981 | In Portuguese |
| Across Suez | Simulations Publications, Inc. | 1980 | Released in Japanese by Hobby Japan in 1983; re-released by Decision Games in 1995 |
| The Arab-Israeli Wars | Avalon Hill | 1977 | |
| Bar-Lev | Conflict Games | 1974 | Re-released by Game Designers' Workshop in 1977 |
| The Battle for Jerusalem | Simulations Publications, Inc. | 1977 | |
| Beirut '82: Arab Stalingrad | Decision Games | 1989 | S&T No. 126, 1989 |
| Born to Battle: Peace for Galilee, Suez 73 | Perry Moore | 1991 | |
| Chinese Farm | Simulations Publications, Inc. | 1975 | Released in Japanese by Hobby Japan in 1986 |
| Crisis: Sinai 1973 | GMT Games | 1995 | |
| Fast Attack Boats | Yaquinto Publications | 1980 | |
| The First Arab-Israeli War | Decision Games | 1997 | S&T No. 185, 1997; Kokusai Tsuushinsha – Command Japan No. 22, 1998 in Japanese |
| Flashpoint: Golan | Victory Games | 1991 | |
| Golan ( | Simulations Publications, Inc. | 1975 | |
| Gunfight in the Valley of Tears, October 9, 1973 | Perry Moore | 2003 | |
| IDF | Avalon Hill | 1993 | |
| Jerusalem | Simulations Design Corporation | 1975 | Re-released by Mayfair Games in 1982 and by Cool Stuff Unlimited in 2007 |
| The Last Bliztkrieg 1982 | Perry Moore | 1999 | |
| Middle East '48 | Fantasy Games Unlimited | 1979 | Wargaming No. 4, 1979 |
| Middle East Battles: Suez '56 & El Arish '67 | Decision Games | 2005 | S&T No. 226, 2005 |
| No Middle Ground | Microgame Design Group | 2003 | |
| October War: Tactical Armored Combat in the Yom Kippur Conflict | Simulations Publications, Inc. | 1977 | S&T No. 61, 1977 |
| Operation Badr | West End Games | 1983 | |
| Operation Kadesh | Udo Grebe Gamedesign | 2005 | Command & Strategy No. 3, 2005 |
| Operation Shock Troop | Decision Games | 1994 | S&T No. 168, 1994 |
| Sinai '56 | Wargaming Enterprises | 1969 | |
| Sinai: The Arab-Israeli Wars '56, '67 and '73 | Simulations Publications, Inc. | 1973 | |
| Suez '73 | Game Designers' Workshop | 1981 | |
| Suez to Golan | Simulations Publications, Inc. | 1979 | |
| Valley of Tears: The 7th Brigade Stands Defiant | | 2006 | Armchair General, Vol.3 No. 2, 2006 |
| Yom Kippur | International Team | 1984 | In Italian; re-released in French by Eurogames in 1989 |
| Yom Kippur | The Gamers | 1995 | Re-released in French by Oriflam in 1995; Kokusai Tsuushinsha – Command Japan No. 65, 2005 in Japanese |
| Yom Kippur | Ludopress | 2001 | Alea No. 3, 2001 in Spanish |
| Yom Kippour 1973 | Histoire & Collections | 2001 | In French; Vae Vicitis No. 39, 2001 |

==== Korean War ====
| Name | Publisher | Year | Notes |
|---|---|---|---|
| Korea: The Mobile War 1950–51 | Simulations Publications, Inc. | 1970 | |

==== Vietnam War ====
| Name | Publisher | Year | Notes |
|---|---|---|---|
| Citadel: The Battle of Dien Bien Phu | Game Designers' Workshop | 1977 | |
| Dien Bien Phu | SDC | 1973 | Conflict No. 6, 1973; re-released by Flying Buffalo c. 1977 |
| Diên Biên Phu | Jeux Descartes | 1980 | In French |
| Dien Bien Phu 1954 | Histoire & Collections | 2000 | In French; Vae Victis – No. 33, in 2000 |
| Grunt | Simulations Publications, Inc. | 1971 | S&T No. 26, 1971 |
| Hue | SDC | 1973 | Conflict No. 6, 1973; re-released as Battle for Hue by Simulations Design Corporation in 1977) and as Hue by Mayfair Games in 1982 |
| Platoon | Avalon Hill | 1986 | |
| Search & Destroy: Tactical Combat Vietnam 1965–1966 | Simulations Publications, Inc. | 1975 | |
| Viet Nam | Gamescience – Phillip Orbanes, Designer | 1965 | |
| Year of the Rat | Simulations Publications, Inc. | 1972 | S&T No. 35, 1972 |

==== Contemporary World War III ====
| Name | Publisher | Year | Notes |
|---|---|---|---|
| 1985: Under an Iron Sky | Thin Red Line Games, 2018 | 2018 | |
| 1985: Deadly Northern Lights | Thin Red Line Games, 2020 | 2020 | |
| 1985: Sacred Oil | Thin Red Line Games, 2021 | 2021 | |
| 2nd Fleet | Victory Games | 1986 | |
| 3rd Fleet | Victory Games | 1990 | |
| 5th Fleet | Victory Games | 1989 | |
| 6th Fleet | Victory Games | 1985 | |
| 7th Fleet | Victory Games | 1987 | |
| Aegean Strike: Land, Air and Sea Combat in the Eastern Mediterranean | Victory Games | 1986 | |
| Air & Armor: The Game of Battlefield Command in the Next War | West End Games | 1986 | |
| Air Cav: Helicopter Warfare in the Eighties | West End Games | 1985 | |
| Air Cobra: 1975–1988 Modern Tactical Airmobile Warfare | Operational Studies Group | 1980 | |
| AirLand Battle: Corps Operational Command in Europe | Omega Games | 1988 | |
| Arms Race | AWA | 1976 | |
| Assault: Tactical Combat in Europe: 1985 | Game Designers' Workshop | 1983 | |
| BAOR: The Thin Red Line in the 1980s – Central Front Series, Volume 3 | Simulations Publications, Inc. | 1981 | S&T No. 88, 1981 |
| Battlefield: Europe | Game Designers' Workshop | 1990 | |
| Berlin '85: The Enemy at the Gates | Simulations Publications, Inc. | 1980 | S&T No. 79, 1980 |
| Boots & Saddles: Air Cavalry in the '80s | Game Designers' Workshop | 1984 | |
| Bundeswehr: An Assault Series Module | Game Designers' Workshop | 1986 | |
| Bundeswehr: Northern Germany, late 1970s | Simulations Publications, Inc. | 1977 | |
| Central Command: Superpower Confrontation in the Straits of Hormuz | TSR | 1984 | S&T No. 98, 1984 |
| The China War | Simulations Publications, Inc. | 1979 | S&T No. 76, 1979 |
| CityFight: Modern Combat in the Urban Environment | Simulations Publications, Inc. | 1979 | |
| Cold War Battles: Budapest '56 & Angola '87 | Decision Games | 2006 | S&T No. 235, 2006 |
| Cold War Battles 2: Kabul '79 & Pentomic Wurzburg | Decision Games | 2010 | S&T No. 263, 2010 |
| Corps Command: Dawn's Early Light | Lock 'N' Load Publishing, LLC | 2010 | |
| Cuban Missile Crisis: The Threshold of Nuclear War | Microgame Design Group | 2002 | |
| Dark Passage: The Invasion of Pakistan | Swedish Game Production | 1981 | |
| Donau Front: Ardennes of the 1990s – Central Front Series, Volume 5 | 3W | 1989 | S&T No. 131, 1989 |
| Drive on Frankfurt | Pacific Rim Publishing | 1981 | CounterAttack No. 4, 1981 |
| East and West | International Team | 1987 | |
| The East Is Red: The Sino-Soviet War | Simulations Publications, Inc. | 1974 | S&T No. 42, 1974 |
| FEBA (Forward Edge of the Battle Area) | Close Simulations | 1983 | |
| Fifth Corps – Central Front Series, Volume 1 | Simulations Publications, Inc. | 1980 | S&T No. 82, 1980 |
| Firefight | Simulations Publications, Inc. | 1976 | Re-released by TSR, Inc. in 1983 |
| Firepower | Avalon Hill | 1984 | |
| Fire Team: Modern Squad Level Command | West End Games | 1987 | |
| First Strike | Schutze Games | 2008 | |
| Fulda Gap | Simulations Publications, Inc. | 1977 | |
| Group of Soviet Forces, Germany | Decision Games | 2003 | S&T No. 223, 2003 |
| Gulf Strike: Land, Air and Sea Combat in the Persian Gulf | Victory Games | 1983 | |
| Harpoon: Modern Naval Wargame Rules | Game Designers' Workshop | 1981 | |
| High Tide: The Cold War, 1980–1989 | Clash of Arms Games | 2003 | |
| Hof Gap: The Nurnberg Pincer – Central Front Series, Volume 2 | Simulations Publications, Inc. | 1980 | |
| The Hunt for Red October | TSR, Inc. | 1988 | |
| Light Division: Flashpoint in the Gulf! | 3W | 1989 | |
| MBT | Avalon Hill | 1989 | |
| Main Battle Area | Omega Games | 1985 | |
| Mechwar '77 | Simulations Publications, Inc. | 1975 | |
| Mechwar 2 | Simulations Publications, Inc. | 1979 | |
| Mission: Grenada – Operation Urgent Fury | Close Simulations | 1985 | |
| Mukden: Sino-Soviet Combat in the 70's | Simulations Publications, Inc. | 1975 | |
| NATO Division Commander | Simulations Publications, Inc. | 1979 | |
| NATO: Operational Combat in Europe in the 1970s | Simulations Publications, Inc. | 1973 | |
| NATO: The Next War in Europe | Victory Games | 1984 | |
| The Next War: Modern Conflict in Europe | Simulations Publications, Inc. | 1978 | |
| NORAD: Strategic Game of Air Warfare | Simulations Design Corporation | 1973 | Conflict No. 4, 1973 |
| Nordkapp: World War III in the Arctic Circle | TSR | 1983 | S&T No. 94, 1983 |
| North German Plain: Ardennes of the 1990s – Central Front Series, Volume 4 | 3W | 1988 | S&T No. 117, 1988 |
| Objective Moscow | Simulations Publications, Inc. | 1978 | |
| Oil War: American Intervention in the Persian Gulf | Simulations Publications, Inc. | 1975 | S&T No. 52, 1975 |
| Operation Whirlwind: The Soviet Invasion of Hungary 1956 | Microgame Design Group | 2002 | |
| RDF (Rapid Deployment Force): Global Cavalry for the 80's | TSR | 1983 | S&T No. 91, 1983 |
| Red Christmas | Thunderhaven Game Company | 1992 | |
| Red Star/White Star: Tactical Combat in Western Europe in the 1970s | Simulations Publications, Inc. | 1972 | |
| The Red Storm: NATO versus the Warsaw Pact | Yaquinto Games | 1983 | |
| Red Storm Rising | TSR, Inc. | 1989 | |
| Revolt in the East: Warsaw Pact Rebellion in the 1970s | Simulations Publications, Inc. | 1976 | S&T No. 56, 1976 |
| Seapower & the State: A Strategic Study of World War Three at Sea, 1984–1994 | Simulations Canada | 1982 | |
| Superpowers at War: Operations in Western Europe | TSR | 1985 | S&T No. 100, 1985 |
| Tac Air: The Game of Modern Air-Land Battles in Germany | Avalon Hill | 1987 | |
| Task Force: Naval Tactics and Operations in the 1980s | Simulations Publications, Inc. | 1981 | |
| Team Yankee | Game Designers' Workshop | 1987 | |
| The Third World War: Arctic Front | Game Designers' Workshop | 1985 | |
| The Third World War: Battle for Germany | Game Designers' Workshop | 1984 | |
| The Third World War: Persian Gulf | Game Designers' Workshop | 1986 | |
| The Third World War: Southern Front | Game Designers' Workshop | 1984 | |
| Twilight Struggle: The Cold War, 1945–1989 | GMT Games | 2005 | |
| Ultimatum: A Game of Nuclear Confrontation | Yaquinto Games | 1979 | |
| Warplan Dropshot | Schutze Games | 2002 | |
| World at War: Blood and Bridges | Lock 'N' Load Publishing, LLC | 2008 | |
| World at War: Death of 1st Panzer | Lock 'N' Load Publishing, LLC | 2008 | |
| World at War: Eisenbach Gap | Lock 'N' Load Publishing, LLC | 2007 | |
| World War 3 | Simulations Publications, Inc. | 1975 | |
| Wurzburg: Soviet-American Combat in the 70's | Simulations Publications, Inc. | 1975 | |
| Yugoslavia: The Battles for Zagreb, 1979 | Simulations Publications, Inc. | 1977 | |

== Fictional ==
=== Alternate history ===
| Name | Publisher | Year | Notes |
|---|---|---|---|
| Crimson Skies | FASA | 1998 | |
| Dixie | Simulations Publications, Inc. | 1976 | S&T No. 54, 1976 |
| Fortress America | Milton Bradley | 1986 | |
| Amerika | Historical Board Gaming | 2015 | |

=== Science fiction ===
| Name | Publisher | Year | Notes |
|---|---|---|---|
| Alpha Omega | Battleline Publications | 1977 | Re-released by Avalon Hill in 1980 |
| Amoeba Wars | Avalon Hill | 1981 | |
| Asteroid Zero-Four | Task Force Games | 1979 | |
| The Awful Green Things from Outer Space | TSR, Inc. | 1979 | Dragon Magazine No. 28, 1979; re-released by Steve Jackson Games in 1990 |
| Azhanti High Lightning | Game Designers' Workshop | 1980 | |
| BattleFleet Mars | Simulations Publications, Inc. | 1977 | |
| BattleTech | FASA | 1984 | |
| Battlerider | Game Designers' Workshop | | |
| Buck Rogers – Battle for the 25th Century | TSR, Inc. | 1988 | |
| Car Wars | Steve Jackson Games | 1981 | |
| The Company War | Mayfair Games | 1983 | |
| Cosmic Encounter | Eon Games | 1977 | Re-released by West End Games in 1986, by Mayfair Games in 1991, and by Avalon Hill in 2000 |
| The Creature That Ate Sheboygan | Simulations Publications, Inc. | 1979 | |
| Dark Horizon: Escape | ACE Games | 1996 | |
| Dark Nebula: Battles for the Stars | Game Designers' Workshop | 1980 | |
| Direct Conflict in Dimension Six | Dimension Six Inc. | 1977 | |
| Federation and Empire | Task Force Games | 1986 | Re-released by Amarillo Design Bureau in 2000 |
| Federation Commander: Klingon Border | Amarillo Design Bureau | 2005 | |
| Federation Commander: Romulan Border | Amarillo Design Bureau | 2006 | |
| Fifth Frontier War | Game Designers' Workshop | 1981 | |
| Freedom in the Galaxy | Simulations Publications, Inc. | 1979 | Re-released by Avalon Hill in 1981 |
| Gammarauders | TSR, Inc. | 1987 | |
| Gateway to the Stars | MAS Projects | 1994 | |
| G.E.V. | Metagaming Concepts | 1978 | Re-released by Steve Jackson Games c. 1980 |
| Godsfire | Metagaming Concepts | 1979 | |
| High Frontier | Sierra Madre Games | 2010 | |
| Imperium | Game Designers' Workshop | 1977 | Re-released as Imperium, 3rd Millennium by Avalanche Press in 2001 |
| Invasion America | Simulations Publications, Inc. | 1976 | |
| Invasion: Earth | Game Designers' Workshop | 1981 | |
| Kill Ball | Travesty Games | 2010 | |
| Last Frontier: The Vesuvius Incident | Fat Messiah Games | 1994 | Solitaire game. Multiplayer version published in 2001 |
| Mayday | Game Designers' Workshop | 1978 | |
| Ogre | Metagaming Concepts | 1977 | Re-released by Steve Jackson Games c. 1980 |
| Renegade Legion: Centurion | FASA | 1988 | |
| Renegade Legion: Interceptor | FASA | 1987 | |
| Renegade Legion: Leviathan | FASA | 1989 | |
| Renegade Legion: Prefect | FASA | 1992 | |
| Rift Trooper | Attack Wargaming Association | 1976 | |
| Risk 2210 A.D. | Avalon Hill | 2001 | |
| Sky Galleons of Mars | Game Designers' Workshop | 1988 | |
| Slag!: Combat on the High Frontier | Blacksburg Tactical Research Center | 1995 | |
| Star Cruiser | Game Designers' Workshop | | |
| Star Fleet Battles | Task Force Games | 1979 | Re-released by Amarillo Design Bureau in 1999 |
| Star Wars – The Queen's Gambit | Avalon Hill | 2000 | |
| Star Wars Tactics | VASSAL Engine | 2009 | |
| Starfire | Task Force Games | 1979 | Re-released as Galactic Starfire by Starfire Design Studio in 2000 |
| Starfleet Wars | Superior Models, Inc. | 1978 | |
| StarForce: Alpha Centauri | Simulations Publications, Inc. | 1974 | |
| Starship: The Game of Space Contact | Fantasy Games Unlimited | 1975 | |
| Starship & Empire | R-Squared Games | 1976 | |
| Starship Troopers | Avalon Hill | 1976 | |
| StarSoldier | Simulations Publications, Inc. | 1977 | |
| Stellar Conquest | Metagaming | 1975 | Re-released by Avalon Hill in 1984 |
| Triplanetary | Game Designers' Workshop | 1973 | |
| Traveller Book 2 Starships | Game Designers' Workshop | | |
| Traveller Book 5 High Guard | Game Designers' Workshop | | |
| Twilight Imperium | Fantasy Flight Games | 2005 | |
| War of the Star Slavers | Attack Wargaming Association | 1977 | |
| The War of the Worlds II | Rand Game Associates | 1974 | |
| WarpWar | Metagaming Concepts | 1977 | |
| World War IV: One World, One King | Ziggurat Games | 2009 | |

=== Fantasy ===
| Name | Publisher | Year | Notes |
|---|---|---|---|
| Albion: Land of Faerie | Simulations Publications, Inc. | 1981 | Ares No. 11, 1981 |
| Arena of Death | Simulations Publications, Inc. | 1980 | Ares No. 4, 1980 |
| Barbarian Kings | Simulations Publications, Inc. | 1980 | Ares No. 3, 1980 |
| Battle Masters | Milton Bradley | 1992 | |
| The Battle of Helm's Deep | Fact & Fantasy Games | 1974 | |
| BattleLore | Days of Wonder | 2006 | |
| Dark Emperor | Avalon Hill | 1985 | |
| Divine Right | TSR, Inc. | 1979 | Re-released by Right Stuf International in 2002, and by Pungo Games in 2025 |
| DragonRage | Dwarfstar Games | 1982 | Re-released by Flatlined Games in 2011 |
| A Game of Thrones | Fantasy Flight Games | 2003 | |
| Gondor: The Siege of Minas Tirith | Simulations Publications, Inc. | 1977 | |
| Greyhawk Wars | TSR, Inc. | 1991 | |
| King of the Mountain | Dimension Six | 1980 | |
| Kings & Things | West End Games | 1986 | |
| Lankhmar | TSR, Inc. | 1976 | |
| Risk Godstorm | Avalon Hill | 2004 | |
| Root | Leder Games | 2018 | |
| Sauron | Simulations Publications, Inc. | 1977 | |
| The Siege of Minas Tirith | Fact and Fantasy Games | 1975 | |
| Sorcerer | Simulations Publications, Inc. | 1975 | |
| Sorcerer King | Wotan Games | 1985 | |
| Titan | Gorgonstar | 1980 | Re-released by Avalon Hill in 1982 |
| Warangel | Self-published | 2001 | |
| War of the Ring | Simulations Publications, Inc. | 1977 | |
| White Bear and Red Moon | Chaosium | 1975 | Re-released as Dragon Pass by Chaosium in 1980; re-released by Avalon Hill in 1984 |
| Wizard's Quest | Avalon Hill | 1979 | |

=== Abstract/generic ===
| Name | Publisher | Year | Notes |
|---|---|---|---|
| Attack! | Eagle Games | 2003 | |
| Blitzkrieg | Avalon Hill | 1965 | |
| Castle Risk | Parker Brothers | 1986 | |
| Conquest | Self-published | 1972 | Released in German by Bütehorn in 1975 and in German by Hexagames in 1983 |
| Farlander | Revaler | 2002 | |
| Feudal | 3M | 1967 | Re-released by Avalon Hill in 1976 |
| Insurgency | Battleline Publications | 1979 | |
| Kriegspiel | Avalon Hill | 1970 | |
| Pizza Wars | Heathen Thorn Enterprises | 1988 | |
| Risk | Parker Brothers | 1959 | |
| Strategy I | Simulations Publications, Inc. | 1971 | |
| Strike Force One | Simulations Publications, Inc. | 1975 | |
| Summit | Milton Bradley | 1961 | |
| Supremacy | Supremacy Games | 1984 | |
| Tactics | Self-published | 1953 | Re-released as Tactics I by Avalon Hill in 1983 |
| Tactics II | Avalon Hill | 1958 | |
| TEG: Plan Táctico y Estratégico de la Guerra | New Yetem | 1976 | In Spanish |
| Warlord | Gibsons Games | 1978 | Re-released as Apocalypse by Games Workshop in 1980 |

== See also ==
- List of miniature wargames
