= The Golden Horde (board game) =

1978 strategy board game

Cover art by R.P. Winther, 1978

The Golden Horde is a two-player combat board game that was published by Excalibre Games in 1978.

== Description ==
The Golden Horde is a strategy game designed by Dennis O'Leary and R.J. Hlavnicka, with artwork by R.P. Winther, that simulates the Mongol conquests of Asia and Europe in the first half of the 13th century. One player controls the Mongol side and the other player controls their main opponents (Poles, Hungarians, Russians, Bulgars, Georgians, Alans, Kumans, people of Hsi-Hsia, Chinese, Kara-Khitans, people of the Khwarazmian Empire and people of Sung), called "the Allies".

The game components are:

- 210 die-cut counters
- a 22" x 12" two-color paper map covering an area from Scandinavia to Vietnam
- cover sheet
- four-page rulebook
- errata sheet
- ziplock bag for storage

Gameplay also requires a six-sided die, which is not included.

== Gameplay ==
The Mongols attempt to conquer as many Allied homelands as possible. Once all units belonging to a homeland have been destroyed, the homeland is considered conquered, and the homeland cannot generate any more replacements.

=== Combat and movement ===
There are two numbers on each counter, representing combat strength and movement. Allied counters can be stacked two high, and Mongols three high. Unlike many war games, counters are not surrounded by Zones of Control where opposing units must stop and combat is compulsory. Instead, all attacks are optional, and counters can move by opposing counters without stopping.

Terrain has an effect on combat: Mountains give the defenders double strength, and rivers reduce the attacker's strength by half. There is a separate combat results table for city sieges.

Although the Mongols seem outnumbered, only the Poles and Hungarians can move outside their respective regions, while all other Allies are limited to their home regions. The Mongol player can also use the Mongol leader counter and four war machine counters to increase attack odds.

=== Victory conditions ===
If at any time the number of conquered homelands outnumbers the remaining Mongol units, then the Mongol player wins. If the Allied player destroys all Mongol units before this happens, the Allied player wins.

== Reception ==
In the September 1980 edition of Dragon (issue #41), Bryan Beecher thought the map, although fairly accurate, was bland, and he also thought the terrain was not varied enough. However, he concluded that "The Golden Horde is a fast-moving, easy-to-learn, fun game. It is a good buy for $4.00."

== See also ==
- Glossary of board games
- List of board wargames
