= 1972 in games =

This page lists board and card games, wargames, and miniatures games published in 1972. For video and console games, see 1972 in video gaming.

== Games released or invented in 1972 ==
- 4000 A.D.
- Boggle
- Conquest
- Don't Give Up The Ship!
- Richthofen's War

== See also ==
- 1972 in video gaming
