= Dark Horizon: Escape =

1996 science fiction board wargame

- Cover art by Quinton Hoover
- Designers: Kevin Brusky
- Illustrators: Quinton Hoover
- Publishers: APE Games
- Publication: 1996
- Genres: Science fiction board wargame

Dark Horizon: Escape is a science fiction board wargame published by APE Games in 1996 that simulates personal combat between opposing sides.

== Description ==
Dark Horizon: Escape is a tactical combat simulation for two players, or up to six players divided into two teams.

=== Setting ===
The game is set in 2031, when Talobar Technologies develops an Armageddon Device. One player or team controls agents of the People for a UNified Tomorrow (PUNT), who try to break into the Talobar lab, destroy the device, and successfully escape. The other player or team controls the Talobar security forces defending the building. The game includes various scenarios that take between 60–150 minutes to play.

=== Components ===
The game box includes:

- 10 metal miniatures
- 5 square-gridded floor tile sheets. Each 1.25 inches (3.2 cm) square represent 9 feet (2.7 m)
- 12 upright doors
- 24 Close Combat cards
- a 32-page illustrated rulebook, including 5 starter scenarios
- 10 erasable status logs and an erasable felt-tipped pen
- 120 die-cut counters
- 4 dice

The five interlocking floor tiles can be arranged to form different levels of the facility. The stand‑up doors create a 3‑D effect on the board. The pewter playing pieces represent both freedom fighters and Talobar's goons.

=== Gameplay ===
Game turns are divided into 15 one-second impulses. (Four game turns equals one minute of combat.) Players move and fire weapons in sequence, rolling dice to hit opponents and deal damage. The PUNT player or team win, if they complete the scenario mission. The Talobnar player wins by preventing this.

== Publication history ==
Kevin Brusky had grown up playing Dungeons & Dragons and board wargames. At age 32, while he was a software engineer at Compaq, he started to design a miniatures wargame with a science fiction setting. After the staff and customers of Gamemasters, a game store in Houston, playtested the game, Brusky formed APE Games in 1996 to publish 1500 copies of the game, titled Dark Horizon: Escape. The game featured premium components, and artwork by Quinton Hoover. Brusky wanted to premier the game at Gen Con 1996, but ultimately ended up selling most copies of the game in Texas. He reported good sales by October of that year.

Brusky planned to produce a series of Dark Horizon board wargames, but only one other game was released by APE, Dark Horizon: Notice of Termination in 1997.

== Reception ==
Rick Swan reviewed Dark Horizon: Escape for Dragon #239 (September 1997), calling it a "clever science-fiction board game" and commenting that "Though the game utilizes deceptively sophisticated tactics, what makes it a pleasure to the play are the components: five sheets of thick cardboard room tiles, ten status logs that can be used with an erasable felt tip pen (included), ten metal miniatures."

In Issue 12 of Simulacrum, Mark Wegierski called this a "lavishly produced game ... using the finely-crafted miniatures." However, Wegierski thought the excellent components were wasted on this game, noting, "The societal background (a corporate-run dystopia) appears to have been put in on a rather perfunctory basis. The main point of the game appears to be the slam-bang kind of action most often found in arcade-style computer games." Wegierski concluded, "The disjunction between the amount of effort put into the production of physical components, and that devoted to sketching out the background, is rather too jarring."
