= The Major Battles and Campaigns of General George S. Patton =

WWII board wargame

- Designers: Sid Sackson; Bob Champer
- Publishers: Research Games Inc.
- Publication: 1973
- Genres: World War II

The Major Battles and Campaigns of General George S. Patton is a board wargame published by Research Games Inc. (RGI) in 1973 that simulates three battles of World War II in which General George S. Patton played a significant role.

== Description ==
Patton is a 2-player tactical board wargame in which one side controls Allied forces, and the other side controls Axis forces.

=== Components ===
The game includes a mounted map where towns and important intersections are joined by roads, which have three qualities: excellent, good and poor. The game also includes thin cardstock counters representing military units and a deck of 24 Movement cards.

=== Gameplay ===
The game system uses a standard "I Go, You Go" system of alternating turns, where the Allied player moves and attacks, followed by the Axis player. The game system has been characterized as "simple".

=== Movement ===
Movement is dependent on the quality of the road taken, since better quality roads allow a higher rate of travel. At the start of the game, the Movement deck is shuffled, and then each player receives 12 of the cards, which are placed face down on the table. On the first Allied turn, the player turns over the first card of their Movement deck, which reveals how many movement points they have for their turn, which can be divided between as many or as few units as the player desires. On the Axis turn, the player turns over the first card of their Movement deck, and can use the movement points revealed as well as the movement points from the Allied card that is face up. On the next Allied turn, the player turns over a new card, and uses the sum of points from their card and the face-up Axis card. Thus, after the first Allied turn, both players always use the sum of the two latest movement cards that are face up.

=== Combat ===
For each armored unit and every two infantry units involved in a combat, each player rolls two six-sided dice, up to a maximum of five dice. Every double that is thrown (or a "6" if only die is thrown) scores a hit. Every triple scores two hits, and four of a kind scores three hits. After hit units are removed from the board, each player's dice roll is totalled, and all the involved units of the player with the lesser sum must retreat. If the units cannot retreat because they are surrounded, all of the units surrender, and are removed from the game.

=== Scenarios ===
The game comes with three scenarios:

- Sicily Invasion: The Allied player must capture all of Sicily and eliminate all Axis units before the end of the last turn.
- Normandy Breakout: The Allied player must capture strategic towns in the German rear before the end of the last turn.
- Battle of the Bulge: Bastogne is surrounded by German forces and must be relieved.

== Publication history ==
In the early 1970s, well-known family game designer Sid Sackson turned his hand to wargames, and with Bob Champer, designed The Major Battles and Campaigns of General George S. Patton, which was released by RGI in 1973. This was followed by The Major Battles and Campaigns of General Douglas MacArthur in 1974, which used the same game system. Both games were published by a number of other companies, including Athol and Waddingtons.

In a 1976 poll conducted by Simulations Publications Inc. to determine the most popular board wargames in North America, Patton placed a dismal 201st out of 202 games.

== Reception ==
Jon Freeman thought the game was simple, but commented that "For all that, it's as good a way as any to prepare your girl or boy friend for more complex war games, and it's not even that bad a game in its own right. A typical game lasts an hour or two, but it can be learned in ten minutes, and the mechanics are simple enough so that you can play without constant recourse to the rules." Freeman thought the "invasion of Sicily" scenario was marginally unbalanced in favor of the Allies, saying, "Despite the theoretically infinite (but in practice slow and irregular) Axis reserves, the Allies seem to have the edge because of the mass defections caused by one or two Allied units loose on the island." Freeman thought the reverse was true in the "Normandy Breakout" scenario, pointing out that "if the Allies cannot immediately seize and hold the unnamed crossroad city between Avranches and Fourgeres, they haven't a prayer."

John Jackson found the cheapness of the components off-putting, saying that the "cheap cardboard counters ... look like a poor imitation of an Avalon Hill or SPI simulation." Jackson also felt that experienced players would shun the game "for lacking the high degree of verisimilitude to which they have become accustomed." Jackson called the combat system "relatively bloodless and also unusual." And Jackson warned that concentration of forces was essential, noting "To have a reasonable chance of chance of inflicting casualties, you must roll at least three dice — preferably more."

History professor Martin Campion noted, "The game system is quite different from that of any other recent wargame. It is much simpler than most, reminiscent of the system used in Milton Bradley's Battle Cry, but with a lesser luck factor." Campion concluded, "The games are fascinating and fast and not as far removed from reality as I had at first suspected."
