= Micro Modern World War 2 =

Micro Modern World War 2 is a 1976 wargame published by Tabletop Games.

== Gameplay ==
Micro Modern World War 2 is a game in which a German Panzer Division fights a Russian Infantry Division.

== Reception ==
Mike Davey reviewed Micro Modern World War 2 in Perfidious Albion #18 (June 1977) and stated that "This game is not strictly a board game, but it isn't a wargame with figures [...] There is very little use of dice and it is possible to do without dice."
