= Piercing the Reich =

Board wargame

Piercing the Reich, subtitled "The Battle for Aachen, Siegfreid Line Campaign, September–October 1944", is a board wargame published by Moments in History (MiH) in 1995 that is an operational simulation of the Battle of Aachen during World War II.

== Background ==
After their breakout from Normandy in August 1944, and a rapid advance through France, Allied forces came up against the Siegfried Line along the heavily defended German border in September 1944. American forces attacked the line at the city of Aachen, hoping to achieve a quick breakthrough that would allow them to capture their first German city and move into the industrial heartland of the Ruhr Valley.

== Description ==
Piercing the Reich is a two-player wargame using a set of rules created by MiH for their previous wargame publication Triumphant Fox. One player controls the German forces entrenched before the city of Aachen. The other player controls the Allied forces. Due to a variable objective rule, the Allies' final objective is determined randomly.

=== Components ===
The game box contains:

- 22" x 34" paper hex grid map, scaled at 1 km (0.6 mi) per hex
- 360 double-sided die-cut counters
- 64-page rule book
- four player aid cards
- a 10-sided die

=== Scenarios ===
Five scenarios are presented, but the first is a solo training scenario, and 4 and 5 are the eight-turn campaign game.

=== Gameplay ===
The German player starts with a large proportion of second-rate troops (Volksgrenadiers) but they are in a strong defensive position, and benefit from strong reinforcements later in the game. The American player starts with more forces, but they are of lower effectiveness, reflecting their lack of combat experience.

Each turn, both sides roll for initiative, with the winner able to activate a unit first for movement or combat. Each unit is rated from 4 to 7 for the number of times per turn it can be activated. If a unit moves adjacent to an enemy unit, the opponent has a chance for a reactive activation.

During each turn, the American player must draw a chit from a pool of seven; four are blank, and three of them contain an attack objective (either take Aachen, surround Aachen, or bypass Aachen and push to the Roer River). The German player has a 1 in 10 chance each turn to discover the American objective.

As reviewer David Fox noted, combat is quite complex, and involves either a hasty attack or a prepared attack that can involve air support, artillery and engineers.

=== Victory conditions ===
For the campaign game, the American player must amass 36 victory points to win, earning these from damaging and destroying enemy units and taking certain geographical objectives. The German player wins by preventing the American player from reaching 36 points.

== Talking version ==
MiH offered an instructional audiocassette for sale titled "Talking Version". The tape featured commentary by the game designer, Dirk Blennemann, and MiH founder Ulrich Blennemann, who play through some of Scenario 2 while discussing what is happening, and how the play is affected by the rules.

== Publication history ==
Piercing the Reich was designed by Dirk Blennemann, an officer in the German reserves who lived in Aachen. Interior art was by John Kranz, and cartography was by Beth Queman. The game was published by MiH in 1995.

Twenty years later, Blennemann revised the rules for the game. He also responded to criticism of Piercing the Reich's ugly map and artwork by completely redesigning and updating the graphics. The result, Crossing the Line, Aachen 1944, was published by Furor Teutonicus Games in 2019.

== Reception ==
In Issue 44 of The Canadian Wargaming Journal, Keith Martens found the rules "quite complete and clearly laid out." He thought the game was balanced, with the Germans weaker but entrenched, and the Americans more numerous but greener. Martens concluded with a strong recommendation, saying, "Give Piercing the Reich a go. You will not be disappointed.

David Fox, writing for Berg's Review of Games, thought the game box's cover was "dreadful", and "The map, ugh, is Beth Queman in one of her less-than-inspired moments. [...] Yuck." Despite this Berg liked the rules, saying, "I like this system a lot-- it's an original way of portraying the fluid, attack/counter-attack nature of World War II mobile combat." Although he found the combat system quite complex, he came to like it. Fox concluded "Another winner from Moments in History [...] the best, and most enjoyable, battalion-level WWII around."

Eric Pass, in Issue 106 of Games Games Games, disagreed with other reviewers that the map was terrible, finding the map "neither execrable nor outstanding." Pass noted that this was a new generation of wargame that deviated from the 30-year tradition of "I go, You go", and although he found the new rules complex to learn, "players who persevere will be rewarded with a tense, exciting game winnable by both sides." He concluded with a strong recommendation, saying, "A fine balance of playability and simulation, I recommend PtR as a good study of the Battle of Aachen."

In Issue 5 of Zone of Control, Henry Lowood liked all of the components except the map, calling it a "significant disappointment. From almost any angle or distance, the map's dominant color mix repels the eye." Lowood also liked the mix of innovative rules, writing, "the ease with which these elements fit together settles players nicely into the flow of the thrust-and-parry sequences that nicely mirror the broken, discontinuous nature of the historical campaign." Lowood concluded by rating the game "Good" for gameplay and "Excellent" for historicity, writing, "Piercing the Reich is an outstanding vehicle for studying the course of the Aachen campaign ... [It] demonstrates impressively that it is possible to provide historical insight, offer innovative game mechanics, and provide an enjoyable gaming experience in a single wargame."

Matt White reviewed the second edition of the game, Crossing the Line, for Armchair General, and found the quality of the "beautiful" artwork and graphics was a marked improvement over the 1st edition. He did not find the rules overly complex, rating them a 6 out of 10 on the complexity scale, and noted, "The game features many interesting rules and game mechanics." Although White found the scenarios long, he still thought the campaign game was "engrossing and very compelling." He concluded with a strong recommendation, saying, "This is an excellent maiden game package from Furor Teutonics Games and I look very much forward to what they produce in the future."

== Awards ==
The first edition of Piercing the Reich was a finalist for the Charles S. Roberts Award for "Best World War II Board Game of 1995".
