= Iliad: The Siege of Troy =

Iliad: The Siege of Troy is a 1978 wargame published by Conflict Games.

== Gameplay ==
Iliad: The Siege of Troy is a game in which the Trojan War is simulated with a focus on heroic battles, following the style of Homer's epic.

- Hero-Based Combat: Over 50 heroes, each with attack, defense, movement, and saving throw stats.
- Map and Setting: Represents the plains of Troy and its topless towers.
- Hero Arrival: Each side starts with three core heroes (e.g., Achilles, Paris, Aeneas) and gains more through playing cards.
- Greek Camp and Achilles: Greeks arrive by ship, forming a camp. Achilles remains there until triggered by events like Patroclus' death.
- Paris and Aphrodite: Paris can be healed but must be forced back into battle by a major Trojan hero.
- Combat Mechanics: Involves retreats and wounds, with limited actions per turn.
- Divine Intervention: Each side has four gods to appeal to. Sacrifice Points enhance combat, saving throws, and hero engagement.
- God Cards: Players draw a god card each turn, which can alter battles unless blocked by an opposing god.
- Victory Conditions: Players must earn 10 Victory Points (VPs) and hold them for four turns to win.

== Reception ==
Charles H. Vasey reviewed Iliad: The Siege of Troy in Perfidious Albion #39 (May 1979) and stated that "Apart from the uninspired graphics on the counters I felt this was a most enjoyable game. It's much more than a simple biff-biff battle. Player interaction is considerable and the system contains all sorts of neat tricks. The super-buff might wish to increase the number of special rules - and I think he would find this comparitively easy to do so. A nice, evocative, understated game. I noted that Steve List appears to consider it a beer and pretzels game - poppycock my dear sir, the loss of armies has increased the simulation aspect."

== Reviews ==
- The Complete Book of Wargames
