= Hannibal (wargame) =

Board wargame published in 1969

Hannibal is a board wargame self-published by game designer Laurence Rusiecki in 1969 that simulates the Second Punic War between Rome and Carthage. A second edition with revised rules was published by Histo Games in 1972.

== Background ==
In the First Punic War, Rome and Carthage battled over ownership of the island of Sicily, ending in a Roman victory. After a period of relative peace, in 218 BC, Hannibal marched over the Alps to attack Rome, setting off the Second Punic War, a series of battles that lasted for seventeen years.

== Description ==
Hannibal is a two-player board wargame where one player controls the forces of Carthage, and the other play controls the Roman forces. With only 84 counters, the game is considered relatively easy to play.

The game starts in 318 BC. With each turn representing one year, the game lasts for a maximum of seventeen turns. Victory points are awarded for cities and territories conquered and battles won. At any time if one side has a 25-point advantage, the game is instantly over. If neither side gains this margin of victory by the end of the game, the contest is declared a draw.

Neither side enters a battle with a real advantage, and critics noted that skillful players avoided combat "unless the stakes are high and they can afford the possible loss." Reviewer George Phillies noted "There are few major battles when cautious players play because battles are very hazardous and strength does not help very much."

In the first edition (1969), rules included an optional tactical tabletop battle rather than using random dice rolls, a battle points system, alliances, raids, and traps. In the second edition, (1972), these rules were all eliminated in favor of streamlining the game.

== Publication history ==
In 1969, Laurence Rusiecki designed Hannibal, added graphics designed by himself and his brother Gregory, and self-published the game. Following publication, Rusiecki streamlined the rules, and the second edition was published by Histo Games in 1972. Histo Games published a third edition in 1973.

== Reception ==
In The Guide to Simulations/Games for Education and Training, Martin Campion noted that the rules "are a little [more] ambiguous than is usual." However, Campion concluded that Hannibal was "an excellent simulation of the main strategic problems on both sides during the Second Punic War."

In Issue 7 of Moves, George Phillies commented, "Its system is quite different from that of most war games and the result is fascinating." Phillies noted "Both sides have to make correct and careful strategic decisions by allocating their resources to the best theaters." He did warn that "At times the progress of the game is painfully slow. It is, therefore, the very stuff of strategy." Phillies questioned some of the historicity of the game, saying "it does miss reflecting the history of the war in several particulars." Overall, Phillies judged the game to be "excellent although the rules need considerable interpretation."

== Other reviews and commentary ==
- Panzerfaust #56
