= Like Lions They Fought =

Like Lions They Fought is a 1994 board game published by XTR Corp.

== Gameplay ==
Like Lions They Fought is a game in which an eight‑turn colonial war game has fast‑moving Zulu impis try to overwhelm British columns, disrupt supply trains, and prevent the march on Ulundi while the Brits fire, retreat, counterattack, and race to burn kraals and capture Cetswayo under tightly structured movement, combat, and after‑battle rules.

== Reception ==
Perfidious Albion felt that "Like Lions They Fought is an accessible game that appears to be traditional, but underneath it has made a genuine attempt at simulating the problems of colonial warfare. I enjoyed it and it adds further lustre to the organ of the Marshal-Duke of Belluno."
