= Siege!: The Game of Siege Warfare, 50 AD-1400 AD =

Board game published in 1974 by Fact and Fantasy Games

Siege!: The Game of Siege Warfare, 50 AD-1400 AD is a board game published in 1974 by Fact and Fantasy Games that simulates various sieges through the ages.

== Description ==
Siege! is a 2-player board wargame focused on historical tactical sieges and storming castles using increasingly sophisticated tools and weapons from the 1st to the 15th century. One player controls the attacking force, while the other player defends the town. Several scenarios are included such as a Pictish attack on Hadrian's Wall, the siege of a castle from 400 AD and the siege of a walled city from 1400 AD. A 16" x 21" hex grid map is included that has a variety of terrain as well as a town and motte and bailey surrounded by a curtain wall. Several other fortifications from various time periods can be added to the map via separate hex sheets laid on top of the board.

Included with the mix of military counters, there are counters for a dragon, leader and superhero, but there are no rules for using these.

=== Gameplay ===
The game uses a simple "You Go, I Go" alternating turn system, with each side having an opportunity for missile fire, movement and combat.

=== Victory conditions ===
Both attacking and defending players are awarded a victory point for each enemy unit eliminated. For each attacking piece on top of or inside the town's wall, the attacker receives two victory points. At the end of the scenario's allotted number of turns, the player with the most victory points wins.

== Publication history ==
In 1974, Fact and Fantasy Games, based in Maryland Heights, Montana published Siege!, a board wargame game designed by Richard R. Jordison.

== Reception ==
In Issue 9 of Europa, Harti Ammann commented, "Unfortunately [the rules] are a total failure in some points" and cited several examples including vague Line of Sight rules and silence on who can own and use siege machines." Ammann also felt the defender could not possibly win the game due to the structure of victory points, and suggested after a game, the players trade roles, and the player with the most total points after having been both attacker and defender would be the winner. Despite these issues, Ammann found "The game itself is easy and simple to play." Ammann concluded, "On the whole this is a highly enjoyable game, fast moving and bloody. I really had a great time playing it. It does have its drawbacks though ... and it makes the impression of a game that isn't quite finished yet. It is to be hoped that the designers work some more on it and especially clear up the rules."

In The Guide to Simulations/Games for Education and Training, Martin Campion felt that the time scale was rushed, "and it allows the preliminaries like bombardment to be gotten over rather too quickly." Campion also didn't like the low number of scenarios, and found them "sketchy and uninteresting." However, he did note that "The game includes many pieces that can be used by players to set up their own scenarios."

== Other reviews and commentary ==
- Fire & Movement #42
