= Tatchanka =

Board wargame set in post-WWI Ukraine

- Game cover showing a tatchanka
- Designers: Dennis Bishop; Jim Bumpas
- Illustrators: Dennis Bishop; Jim Bumpas
- Publishers: Self-published
- Publication: 1977
- Genres: Bolshevik Revolution

Tatchanka, subtitled "Ukraine: 1919–21", is a small press board wargame published in 1977 that simulates the Ukrainian War of Independence following World War I, when several factions fought for control of the country.

== Background ==
Following the end of World War I, Ukraine, a former part of the Austro-Hungarian Empire, sought to gain independence. A war of many factions broke out between Ukrainian nationalists, Ukrainian anarchists, the forces of Germany and Austria-Hungary, the White Russian Volunteer Army, Bolsheviks sent by Lenin, and Second Polish Republic forces. The result after three years of fighting was the annexation of some Ukrainian territory by Poland, and the absorption of the remainder into the Soviet Union.

== Description ==
Tatchanka is a two-player wargame in which one player controls certain factions, and the other player controls opposing factions. "Tatchanka" is the name of a peasant cart pulled by three horses; during the War of Independence, the tatchanka, with a 50-calibre machine gun mounted facing the rear, became a symbol of the fluidity and mobility of the war.

=== Components ===
The game includes a 22" x 34" hex grid map covering the area from Kjarkov in the north, Tagarog in the east, Perekop in the south and Kiev in the west; 200 counters; a rule booklet; and a play accessory sheet.

=== Gameplay ===
The game uses a system of "I Go, You Go" alternating turns where one side moves and fires, followed by the other side.

== Publication history ==
In the mid-1970s, Dennis Bishop wrote an article for JagdPanther suggesting enhancements to the wargame Schutztruppe. The designer of this game, Jim Bumpas, reached out to Bishop, and the two agreed to work together via postal service on a game about the Ukrainian War of Independence. The result was Tatchanka; the two designers invested $200 each to have 200 copies printed.

Bishop and Bumpas planned to design another game together, but both moved after Tatchanka was published, neither sent the other their new address, and they did not manage to get in touch again before Bumpas died.

== Reception ==
In Craft, Model, and Hobby Industry Magazine, Rick Mataka called this an intermediate-level game, warning that it was designed for "those familiar with boardgaming."

In the inaugural issue of Simularum, Brian Train commented, "This was a very enjoyable game to playtest" but warned "A successful offensive can build momentum and sweep all before it ... Nothing stops you until you get too overconfident and stumble at a hard place ... You will be fortunate if your opponent gives you time to rest." Train concluded, "Tatchanka is an underrated and eminently collectible game, for all the right reasons ... The topic is interesting and not overrepresented, and the simulation itself is simple, well done and effective."
