= Wagram 1809 =

Board game

Wagram 1809 is a 1985 board game published by Mazas Edition.

== Gameplay ==
Wagram 1809 is a game in which reenacts the Napoleonic Battle of Wagram on July 5, 1809, pitting Napoleon's French forces against the Austrian army commanded by Archduke Charles.

== Reviews ==
- Casus Belli #31
- Jeux & Stratégie #38
