= Marine! =

Modern era board wargame

- Cover of JagdPanther #10, which contained Marine!
- Designers: Stephen V. Cole
- Publishers: JagdPanther Publications
- Publication: 1975
- Genres: Modern era combat

Marine! is a tactical board wargame published by JagdPanther Publications in 1975 that simulates various modern-day combat operations involving the US Marine Corps.

== Description ==
Marine! is a two-player tactical wargame in which one player controls a small force of US Marines, and the other player controls the opponent as defined in the chosen scenario. The game is played at the platoon level, with each counter representing a single vehicle, ten soldiers or a one artillery piece. The hex grid map, featuring a generic piece of shoreline, is scaled at 100 metres (110 yd). Each turn represents three minutes of game time. Rules are included for aircraft, helicopters, tanks, and landing craft. Gameplay uses alternating "I Go, You Go" turns, where the Marine player moves and fires first, followed by the other player.

Nine scenarios are included with the game, including the rescue of PoWs, raids of various installations, an army/marine exercise, and the rescue of the SS Mayaguez during the Mayaguez incident.

== Publication history ==
Marine! was created by Stephen V. Cole and published as a free pull-out game in Issue 10 of JadgPanther in 1975. A solitaire version of the game by John Anderson was printed in JagdPanther #12, and a new scenario by Michael Kilway appeared in Jagdpanther #13.

The following year, Cole and Philip Kosnett used the same ruleset to create the game Airborne!

== Reception ==
In the 1977 book The Comprehensive Guide to Board Wargaming, Charles Vasey thought the map was "rather bland", but otherwise thought this was "Good tactical stuff", especially the inclusion of a confusion rule. Vasey concluded, "Neat tactical game with some very interesting subjects."

In Issue 53 of Strategy & Tactics, game designer Richard Berg called this a game of "moderate complexity", and noted with approval the inclusion of the SS Mayaguez rescue scenario.
