= Omaha Beach (wargame) =

WWII board wargame

- Designers: Ken Smigelski
- Publishers: Rand Game Associates
- Publication: 1974
- Genres: World War II

Omaha Beach is a board wargame published by Rand Game Associates (RGA) in 1974 that simulates the American landings on Omaha Beach as part of the D-Day landings during World War II.

== Description ==
Omaha Beach is a 2-player tactical board wargame in which one side controls American invaders, and the other side controls German defenders.

=== Components ===
The map is unusual for the time, using a square grid rather than a hex grid. Each square is scaled at 500 yd (460 m). Movement costs to move through the sides or corners of each square are printed on the boundaries of the square. The beach front of 8,000 yards (7,300 m) is divided into sectors. The cardboard counters are over-sized compared to other games of the time, with rounded corners for ease of play.

=== Set-up ===
The German player decides on their defensive set-up. The American player then assigns units that will go ashore as the first wave. Although the American player can assign up to nine infantry companies, two engineer companies and six amphibious companies to come ashore on the first turn, no more than one infantry company and one tank or amphibious company can be assigned to a single beach sector. Before the first turn begins, the American player conducts a pre-assault bombardment of German strongpoints.

=== Gameplay ===
The game system uses a standard "I Go, You Go" system with a simple sequence of phases. The American player moves first:

1. Designate units coming ashore, and which beach sectors they will land at. Determine how current drift affects incoming units.
2. Movement
3. Fire and assault
4. Counter-assault and melee resolution

The German player then repeats phases 2 –4, although on the first turn, German units have no Movement phase. This completes one game turn, which marks 20 minutes of game time. The game lasts 16 turns.

Although there are no limits to how many units may be stacked in a square, only two units may move or attack through the same boundary or diagonal corner each turn.

In addition to movement and combat, the rules cover ranged artillery, direct and indirect fire. A number of special rules are also included that cover German Tank Units; Headquarters Units; German Divisional Artillery; Incoming Tide; German Minefields; Anti-tank Units; German Strongpoints; German Entrenchments; and Allied combat engineers.

=== Victory conditions ===
Victory points are awarded to the American player for getting units off the invasion beaches, for exiting units off the southern map edge, and for the clearing German mines. The German player works to limit these conditions. If the American player fails to reach the winning victory point total, the German player wins.

=== Scenarios ===
The game comes with two scenarios:

- 2-player Historical Game
- Solitaire Historical Game

== Publication history ==
In 1974, the new game publisher RGA made the marketing decision to sell their first series of wargames via subscription rather than selling individual games in stores or via mail-order. Players who subscribed to "Command Series, Volume I" received the first game, Lee vs. Meade, packaged in an LP-sized folder; they also received an empty box large enough to store the first game plus eight more. A "Universal Command Series Package" was also included that contained a Universal Turn Recorder (a turn record track for up to 30 turns), TAC Cards (6 white cards and 6 red cards numbered from 1–6), and a six-sided die. Subsequent games then arrived every six weeks; the seventh was Omaha Beach, a game designed by Ken Smigelski with interior art by Al Zygler. Several problems were found with the rules during play-testing, but rather than reprint the rules, RGA printed a lengthy errata sheet that was included with the game.

In all, RGA would publish nine games in "Command Series, Volume I".

In a 1976 poll conducted by Simulations Publications Inc. to determine the most popular board wargames in North America, Omaha Beach placed a dismal 195th out of 202 games.

== Reception ==
In his 1977 book The Comprehensive Guide to Board Wargaming, Nick Palmer pointed out the "unusual movement system" caused by the square grid, but noted that the game was "Highly tactical, with mines, strongpoints, a rough sea landing and a pitched battle on the beach." Palmer concluded by warning about the "Very considerable rule problems" and suggested the errata sheet was essential.

In the April 1975 issue of Europa, Cliff Sayre noted that the rules "appear to be clear, but there are a fair number of special rules, exceptions or limitations for more realistic play which will take a while to digest."
