= Alaric the Goth: Fall of the Western Roman Empire =

Board game

Alaric the Goth: Fall of the Western Roman Empire is a 1980 board game published by Strategic Studies Games.

== Gameplay ==
Alaric the Goth is a strategic level game that simulates of the fall of the Roman Empire to the attacking barbarians.

== Reception ==
Richard A. Edwards reviewed Alaric the Goth in The Space Gamer No. 43. Edwards commented that "Alaric the Goth is fair history, a good game, and great fun."
