= Battle with the Graf Spee =

Battle with the Graf Spee is a 1977 wargame published by SoPac Games.

== Gameplay ==
Battle with the Graf Spee is a game in which British ships fight the German cruiser Admiral Graf Spee.

== Reception ==
Cliff Sayre Jr. reviewed Battle with the Graf Spee in Perfidious Albion #19 (July 1977) and stated that "The game may be somewhat overpriced, but it's no ripoff. I've paid more and gotten less. It IS complete, you CAN comprehend the rules, and it is a playable game with some innovative concepts."

== Other reviews and commentary ==
- Fire & Movement #8
