= Arms Race (game) =

Board wargame published in 1976

- Cover art by Jon Wetor
- Designers: Dave Casciano
- Illustrators: Jon Wetor
- Publishers: AWA
- Publication: 1976
- Genres: World War III

Arms Race, subtitled "Simulation of Global War and Strategic Building 1950-2001", is a board wargame published by Attack Wargaming Association (AWA) in 1976 that simulates a hypothetical war between the U.S. and U.S.S.R. using increasingly powerful weapons.

== Contents ==
Arms Race is a two-player game in which the USA and USSR wage war from 1950 to 2001. Players have the choice of using conventional or nuclear weapons, as well as land, sea and air forces. Players can spend money on guerilla forces, political subversion, spies, transportation systems, or economic aid to neutral countries being fought over. The game comes with several proposed scenarios.

Optional rules allow for a third player (taking the role of China), and a fourth player (taking the role of Nazi Germany that has somehow survived World War II.)

== Publication history ==
In 1976, Dave Casciano designed Arms Race, which was subsequently published by his company AWA (also known as Dave Casciano Co. or DCC) packaged in a ziplock bag, with cover art by Jon Wetor. The self-published game was not well-received by the gaming community — in a 1980 readers poll conducted by Ares of 70 science fiction games, Arms Race placed 65th.

== Reception ==
In the 1977 book The Comprehensive Guide to Board Wargaming, Nicholas Palmer described the game as "the USA and USSR [...] slugging it out with armour, infantry, fighters, bombers, spy satellites, U2s, guerillas, transports, subversive political groups, secret foreign services, extensive production rules, and the threat of nuclear war."

In The Guide to Simulations/Games for Education and Training, Martin Campion noted the central concept of the game "is to build the right thing at the right time." However, Campion felt the game "is a very good idea but somewhat flawed in the execution. The rules are sometimes more suggestive than explanatory, the counters are poorly printed and impossible to punch out, and the map is hard to read and aggressively ugly." For teachers planning to use it in the classroom, Campion suggested that they should "be prepared to make up some rules as you go along. Also, it will be better to plan on making your own map."
