= Fight for the Sky =

Board game

Fight for the Sky is a board game published in 1982 by Attactix Adventure Games.

== Contents ==
Fight for the Sky is a game about the Battle of Britain in which the first week after the Adlertag is covered.

== Reception ==
Lee Brimmicombe-Wood reviewed Fight for the Sky for Games International magazine, and gave it 2 stars out of 5, and stated that "it's not a totally bad game. Unfortunately it's not a totally brilliant one either."

== Reviews ==
- Fire & Movement #72
