= Direct Conflict in Dimension Six =

Board game

Direct Conflict in Dimension Six is a science fiction combat board game published in 1977 by Dimension Six, Inc.

== Gameplay ==
Cover art, 1977

Dimension Six is a board game in which two players battle for superiority by mining supplies of a mineral called Delium, which can be used to build missiles.

The game comes with the following components:

- a board representing ordinary space, showing planets where Delium can be mined.
- a second board representing a parallel plane called "Dimension 6" space. Players can use it to quickly travel. Only hand-to-hand combat can occur here.
- a pad of ships' logs
- rules booklet
- a six-sided die

The object of the game is to destroy the other player or conquer all available planets. The two players travel to various planets prospecting for Delium, which they then transport back to their home planet to manufacture powerful missiles. Players can also use their ships to build defensive space stations in orbit around planets, or defensive outposts on their mining planets.

If two scout ships from the opposing players meet, then combat results.

== Reception ==
In the February–March 1979 edition of White Dwarf (Issue #11), Jacek Gabrielczyk thought the game lacked complexity, saying, "Simple isn't it? In fact, too simple." While he thought "The game as it stands would be ideal for young SF enthusiasts who would like to try boardgaming", he gave Direct Conflict in Dimension Six a below-average rating of only 5 out of 10.

In the November 1979 edition of Boys' Life, Jon Halter recommended Direct Conflict in Dimension Six as a good starting place for young readers interested in learning how to play science fiction wargames.
