= Poland, 1939 (wargame) =

WWII board wargame

- Cover of Panzerfaust #49
- Designers: Ted Buynisky
- Publishers: Panzerfaust Publications
- Publication: 1971
- Genres: WWII

Poland, 1939 is a board wargame published by Panzerfaust Publications in 1971 that simulates the German invasion of Poland in 1939.

== Background ==
On 24 August 1939, Germany and the U.S.S.R. signed the Molotov–Ribbentrop Pact, a non-aggression treaty. One week later, German forces invaded Poland, triggering the start of World War II. Two weeks later, Soviet forces invaded Poland from the east.

== Description ==
Poland, 1939 is a 2-player board wargame in which one player controls Polish defenders, while the other player controls the German invaders. The game map depicts western Poland, East Prussia and the borderlands of Germany. In the original Panzerfaust edition, the map was eight letter-sized sheets of paper that had to be joined. The later JagdPanther edition had two 20" x 26" maps.

=== Gameplay ===
The game uses an alternating "I Go, You Go" system where the German player moves and fires, followed by the Polish player. The only exception to this is that some German armored units can move, fire and then move again to exploit resultant holes in the Polish lines. To be considered supplied, units must be able to trace an unhindered line back to a friendly city, or be located within a friendly city. Polish units stacked in Warsaw have double the defensive factors.

The historical scenario lasts 12 turns, although an option exists to extend the game to 18 turns and have a third player control the Soviet invasion.

Critic Andrzej Cierpicki noted that Poland stands no chance in the historical scenario, and that thirteen non-historical scenarios are also included with the game to allow the Polish player some chance of success. These include French and British forces landing in the Free City of Danzig, increased use of tanks and anti-tank regiments by Poland, and free set up by the Polish player.

Optional rules allow for rail movement, air attacks and cavalry screens.

== Publication history ==
Poland, 1939 was designed by Ted Buynisky, and was published as a free pull-out game in Issue 49 of Panzerfaust (October 1971). Stephen V. Cole revised the rules and JagdPanther Publications republished the game as a boxed set in 1973. A further revision by Cole resulted in another edition in 1974, and again in 1975.

== Reception ==
In Issue 52 of Panzerfaust. George Phillies commented, "The German invasion of Poland was a one-sided operation. The Poles themselves had no chance to repel it; they attempted to meet the Germans in the field and were crushed. Theodore Buyniski's game Poland, 1939 reflects these realities." Phillies did note that "the rules however, are not completely precise."

Writing in Issue 77 of Campaign, Don Lowry noted, "The [JagdPanther edition of the] game was originally published in 1973, a revised version appeared in 1974, and this version represents a further revision. It sells for a very reasonable $5.00 and would seem to be well worth it."

In Issue 15 of Perfidious Albion, Andrzej Cierpicki, whose father served in the Polish cavalry during the German invasion, found the rules to be "well written and presented and not very complicated." Given the impossibility of Poland winning, Cierpicki called this "a depressing game for the Polish player, who has very little chance in making any counterattacks except in East Prussia, and must surely lose against any but the most incompetent German player." Cierpicki also found flaws in the number of divisions in play, the abstract air attack rules, and the lack of Polish ability to attack Luftwaffe forces while they are grounded. Despite this, Cierpicki concluded, "I found the game very enjoyable even whilst playing the Poles ... I recommend it if only that it deals with a little understood and quickly forgotten campaign vastly overshadowed by the events that followed it."

In Issue 26 of Simulacrum, Brian Train pointed out, "Germans always win, though not always by as much as one would expect."
