= 1973 in games =

This page lists board and card games, wargames, and miniatures games published in 1973. For video games, see 1973 in video gaming.

== Games released or invented in 1973 ==
- Alien Space
- Anti-Monopoly
- Atlanta Civil War Campaign Game
- Bowl Bound
- Europa
- Hue
- Ironclad
- NORAD
- Panzer Armee Afrika
- Perfection
- Railway Rivals
- Sniper!
- Triplanetary
- Galactic Warfare published by Davco

== Significant game-related events in 1973 ==
- Game Designers' Workshop was founded.
- TSR, Inc. was founded by Gary Gygax and Don Kaye. TSR would go on to release Dungeons & Dragons, the first role-playing game.

== Deaths ==
Date	Name	Age	Notability
April 4	Gösta Knutsson	64	Children's book author who created the Magic Robot Quiz Game

== See also ==
- 1973 in video gaming
