= Bloodiest Day: The Battle of Antietam September 17, 1862 =

1995 board game

Bloodiest Day: The Battle of Antietam September 17, 1862 is a 1995 board game published by Spearhead Games.

== Gameplay ==
Bloodiest Day: The Battle of Antietam September 17, 1862 is a game in which the gameplay is a rapidly shifting sequence of leader‑driven area activations where bombardments, volleys, assaults, impulse limits, casualty‑point attrition, and the "Advantage" mechanic combine.

== Reception ==
Perfidious Albion felt that "Bloodiest Day is an unforgiving game in which you regret much of what you did (but had a jolly good reason when you did it). It loses a lot of tactical detail but, if you can suspend your judgement for a couple of impulses, the result is usually pretty good. That it is badly written will at least encourage you to fiddle with it."
