= Ring of Fire (wargame) =

Card-based wargame

- Cover art by John Kranz
- Designers: John Desch
- Illustrators: John Kranz
- Publishers: Moments in History
- Publication: 1994
- Genres: World War II

Ring of Fire, subtitled "The Fourth Battle for Kharkov, August 1943", is a board wargame published by Moments in History (MiH) in 1994 that simulates the Fourth Battle of Kharkov during World War II.

== Background ==
The German offensive against the Soviet Union that started with Operation Barbarossa in June 1941 had ground to a halt in 1942, putting the Germans on the defensive. In a back-and forth struggle, the Soviet city of Kharkov changed hands several times. By July 1943, it was back in German hands, and Germany's Army Group South had dug in on a line east of Kharkov. On 3 August 1943, the Voronezh and Steppe Fronts (Soviet army groups) launched Operation General Rumyantsev (Russian: Полководец Румянцев) in an attempt to punch holes in the German line that might lead to the retaking of Kharkov, the envelopment and destruction of Army Group South, and a potential breakthrough that would open a path to Germany.

== Description ==
Ring of Fire is an operational-level board wargame for 2 players, where one player controls German forces, while the other controls Soviet forces.

=== Components ===
The game box includes a 22" x 34" hex grid map scaled at 2 kilometres (1.2 mi) per hex, 360 two-sided counters, a 24-page rulebook and various player aids. A 60-minute audiocassette with instructions and suggestions is also included.

=== Set up ===
Unlike many wargames where opening positions are dictated by the rulebook, in Ring of Fire, both players are free to place their initial forces on the board in whatever formations they wish.

=== Gameplay ===
The play sequence for each player in turn is regular movement, combat, Reserve movement, and then a second phase of combat for all units that have not moved more than half of their regular movement allowance.

During combat, tanks that are stacked together do not combine their shots into one die roll, and tanks targeting the stack do not do damage to the entire stack. Instead, each tank fires separately at one target. Firing order and number of shots is determined by the quality of the tank — a high quality tank with a rating of 4 fires first and more often than a tank with a low rating of 1. As critic Charles Vasey noted, "The net result is that when tanks fight there are lots of losses."

=== Scenarios ===
The game comes with two scenarios: a short introductory scenario of the first four turns of the Soviet attack; and the entire battle, estimated to take 5–8 hours to play.

=== Strategy ===
Game designer John Desch wrote, "One of the few influences that a commander can exert over the battlefield once the armies are engaged is the release of reserves." Critic Scott Johnson commented, "Use of reserves can gain you important real estate (offensively), or halt an enemy offensive in its tracks (defensively). The side which uses their reserves most shrewdly will soon reap the laurels of victory … or at least stave off total annihilation."

== Publication history ==
Ring of Fire was designed by John Densch and published by MiH in 1994 with cover art, graphic design and cartography by John Kranz.

In 1997, Kokusai-Tsushin (国際通信社) published a Japanese-language version in Issue 14 of Command, and then published a special edition of Command in 2001 that was dedicated to the game.

== Reception ==
In Issue 88 of the British wargaming magazine Perfidious Albion, Charles Vasey called the rules, "concisely written" and noted "we have a system that rewards quality in the mobile field and numbers amongst the infantry, and has some reactive reserve release." Vasey concluded, "My impressions ... are of a tidy design, which has reduced the detritus of its topic to what matters and which will give you a lot of fun if you enjoy Eastern Front battles."

In Issue 16 of Berg's Review of Games, Scott Johnson liked the components, commenting, "Ring of Fire is ... quite a nice package indeed, thanks to art director John Kranz." Johnson also found the rulebook easy to understand, calling it, "well-written." Johnson liked the new move sequence and the new tank rules. Johnson concluded that the game was "moderately easy, enjoyable and competitive ... [a] solid design with good presentation. Worth the bucks."

== Reviews ==
- Casus Belli #84

== Awards ==
At the 1994 Charles S. Roberts Awards, Ring of Fire was a finalist in the category "Best World War II Board Game."
