= Wehrmacht (game) =

1977 WWII board wargame

- Cover of mimeographed rulebook
- Designers: Kenneth Clark
- Publishers: Fusilier Games
- Publication: 1977
- Genres: World War II

Wehrmacht is a 1977 board wargame published by Fusilier Games that depicts combat between the U.S.S.R. and Germany following Germany's 1941 invasion during World War II.

== Description ==
Wehrmacht is a 2-player board wargame depicting the Eastern Front in which one player controls German invaders, and the other player controls Soviet defenders.

The game comes with a 22" x 28" cardstock hex grid map, 200 counters, and a 16-page rulebook. Each game turn represents two months of the war. The only scenario covers the entire war from the German invasion in 1941 to 1945. However, as critic Friedrich Helfferich pointed out, "one side or the other usually achieves a decisive victory well before 1945 ... [By Summer 1942] Soviet reinforcements and replacements become geared to the number of cities still held, so that an advantage on either side snowballs."

== Publication history ==
In 1977, a games group in Aberdeen, Scotland founded Fusilier Games to publish the wargames they had developed for play among themselves. Their first publication was the mimeographed ziplock bag game Wehrmacht, of which only 100 copies were printed.

Fusilier publicized that they had many more games under development, but ultimately only four more were published before the company went out of business in 1978.

== Reception ==
In Issue 20 of the British wargaming magazine Perfidious Albion, Tony Dinsdale was disappointed with the generic title, which failed to tell anything about the game. Dinsdale noted the distinctly amateur production values, especially the counters, which were "decidedly disgusting in nasty pale colours and rubbishy printing." On a positive note, Dinsdale found the rules "apart from the inevitable printing problems, quite good. They are not as full of holes as I expected them to be, though there is a terrible mix-up with the turn sequence, which is not at all clear logically." Dinsdale concluded, "On the whole, the game works quite well - far better than I had expected. In addition to this, there are a number of good and above all new ideas. Most I like - particularly the way encirclements are handled."

In Issue 9 of Fire & Movement, Friedrich Helfferich felt that Fusilier seemed determined to demonstrate its amateur status "with the poor physical quality ... of their first game. (The counters are the worst I have ever seen, and the map is not much better.)" However, Helfferich found that it was "not a bad game at all. The rules are rather complete by amateur standards, [and] play flows quickly." Helfferich called the game's major weakness "its lack of originality. The game unabashedly cribs from its more famous predecessors: it is much like playing Russian Campaign on the Stalingrad map." Helfferich did admit that the game had a few original ideas, but not enough to help it. Helfferich concluded "Overall, Wehrmacht overreaches by placing itself in direct competition with seasoned, polished and repolished, professional products on the same subject. It seems a pity that Fusilier chose so well-trodden a subject for their first effort."
