= Sadowa (game) =

Sadowa is a 1977 wargame published by Fusilier Games.

== Gameplay ==
Sadowa is a game in which the battle at Sadowa during the 1866 Seven Weeks' War is depicted.

== Reception ==
Sadowa was reviewed in Perfidious Albion #26 (March 1978) and stated that "Not a bad game, cheap, needs work (and testing) but only for the committed 19th century freak.'"

== Reviews ==
- Strategy & Tactics #66
