= Gateway to the Stars =

1994 board game

Gateway to the Stars is a 1994 board game published by MAS Projects.

== Gameplay ==
Gateway to the Stars is a game in which each player tries to build the biggest empire in space.

== Reception ==
Ken Carpenter reviewed Gateway to the Stars in White Wolf Inphobia #57 (July, 1995), rating it a 3.5 out of 5 and stated that "While the game has a lot going for it, the price tag is no treat."

== Reviews ==
- Vindicator Vol 1 No 4
