= Arnhem Bridge (board game) =

1982 Attactix Adventure Games board game

Arnhem Bridge is a board game published in 1982 by Attactix Adventure Games.

== Contents ==
Arnhem Bridge is a game in which the XXX Corps attempts to relieve the airborne formation while the Germans try to destroy the Arnhem bridgehead.

== Reception ==
Ellis Simpson reviewed Arnhem Bridge for Games International magazine, and gave it 3 stars out of 5, and stated that "The real tragedy of the game is that the hobby has moved on but games like this haven't. That is not to say it is out of its depth, simply that it could have been improved in the intervening years."

== Reviews ==
- Fire & Movement #40
