= Last Frontier: The Vesuvius Incident =

1993 science fiction solitaire board game

- Designers: Neal Sofge; Michael Wasson
- Publishers: Fat Messiah Games
- Publication: 1993
- Genres: Science fiction

Last Frontier: The Vesuvius Incident is a science fiction solitaire board wargame published by Fat Messiah Games in 1993

== Contents ==
Last Frontier: The Vesuvius Incident is a solitaire game in which aliens have escaped from containment on the Vesuvius, an orbiting lab ship, and have damaged the ship's controls — the ship is now slowly de-orbiting, descending to a fiery demise in the planetary atmosphere. The player controls twelve heavily armed UN Colonial Marines who will attempt a time-limited rescue mission to save the surviving lab ship crew. In order to do this, the Marines will have to overcome the aliens, other escaped lab creatures and a sabotaged ship defense system. Some critics pointed out the similarity in theme to both the 1986 movie Aliens, and Task Force Games's 1980 microgame Intruder.

== Publication history ==
Neal Sofge and Michael Wasson designed Last Frontier: The Vesuvius Incident, which was published by Fat Messiah Games in 1993 as a ziplock game, with art by Steve Buccellato, Gary Simpson, and Marc Siry.

In 2001, Print & Play Productions republished Last Frontier: The Vesuvius Incident as a multiplayer game for 3–8 players.

== Reception ==
In Issue 209 of Dragon (September 1994), Rick Swan liked the "slick illustration and graphic design," and said "the product is in many ways reminiscent of some of the best 'microgames' from Metagaming's heyday and the early years of Steve Jackson Games." Swan pointed out "Some players will find the turn sequence to be too complicated, but the rules are well written, and the map is well designed." Swan concluded, "Fans of the company's earlier Shapeshifters game are certain to like this product."

Tony Lee reviewed Last Frontier: The Vesuvius Incident in White Wolf Inphobia #54 (April, 1995), rating it a 4 out of 5 and stated that "The Vesuvius Incident is a very good choice for the price. If you're a solo play kind of person, you'll get a lot out of it."

In a retrospective review in Issue 16 of Simulacrum, Joseph Scoleri called this game "A real cliff-hanger! [It] takes the genre to a whole new level ... a combination rescue mission /nail-biting race against time/ battle for survival against vicious aliens." Although Scoleri found obvious similarities to the 1980 game Intruder, he noted that this game "then adds some devious twists and turns that will have you cursing the designers as things go from bad to worse." Scoleri concluded, "The random elements and interplay of the threats really add to the challenge and replayability. This is great solitaire gaming given a very attractive presentation.
