= Quinton Hoover =

American artist (1964–2013)

Quinton B. Hoover
- Born: March 16, 1964; Fruita, Colorado, United States
- Died: April 20, 2013 (aged 49); Oklahoma City, Oklahoma
- Known for: cartoonist, artist

Quinton B. Hoover (March 16, 1964 – April 20, 2013) was an American artist best known for his art in the collectible trading card game Magic: The Gathering.

== Career ==
Hoover drew over 70 pieces for the Magic: The Gathering collectible card game. Quinton was the artist for the Magic card "Proposal" which creator Richard Garfield used to propose to his then-girlfriend (and future wife), Lily Wu. Quinton worked as an illustrator for many other card games including Middle-earth Collectible Card Game, and role playing books, including Dungeons & Dragons books such as Monster Manual II (2002) and Book of Vile Darkness (2002). He was the co-creator of the comic Morgana X.

Hoover was born in Fruita, Colorado in 1964, and lived in Oklahoma City, Oklahoma. He was married with four grown children. He died on April 20, 2013.
