= Rommel: The Campaign for North Africa =

Board wargame

- Game components
- Designers: Loren Sperry
- Publishers: Self-published
- Publication: 1973
- Genres: North African campaign World War II

Rommel: The Campaign for North Africa is a board wargame self-published by designer Loren Sperry in 1973 that simulates the North African Campaign during World War II.

== Description ==
Rommel is a two-player wargame in which one player takes the role of Axis forces, and the other controls Allied forces. The game starts with the British offensive in North Africa against the numerically superior Italian army in September 1940, and lasts until December 1942. The entire campaign takes 80 turns, about 15–25 hours of gameplay. The game includes four shorter scenarios that can be completed in a few hours.

The game comes with a 22" x 34" paper map of North Africa from El Agheila to El Alamein, an 8-page rulebook, and a cardstock sheet of 252 counters.

=== Gameplay ===
The game uses a standard "I Go, You Go" system, where one player moves and attacks, followed by the other player. Each turn represents three weeks of game time. Optional rules cover minefields, fortifications and reconnaissance units.

== Supply ==
In an innovation for board wargames, supply plays an important part of the game: all units must be within 5 hexes of a supply unit in order to move and attack, and supply is used up by combat.

== Publication history ==
In 1973, Loren Sperry created Rommel and self-published it. Although critics found the game featured some innovations, notably the supply rules, critics and players were not pleased with the less-than-professional production values of the map and counters. In a 1976 poll conducted by Simulations Publications Inc. to determine the most popular board wargames in North America, Rommel only placed 186th out of 202 games. Critic Nicky Palmer ascribed this to "the semi-amateur flavour given the game by its unmounted board and pieces."

== Reception ==
In Issue 23 of Moves, game designer Richard Berg found the production values of the components unprofessional, writing, "Rand's Rommel, although not strictly speaking an amateur production, earns all the derogative [sic] connotations of that word." Berg also found the game suffered from ambiguous and poorly written rules, saying, "What could have been quite a good game with some nice innovations in the supply and reserve areas suffers from a severe case of obfuscation, and Rommel consequently carries all the impact of last week's eggplant."

In his 1977 book The Comprehensive Guide to Board Wargaming, Nicky Palmer found this game to be "an interesting development of the techniques of Afrika Korps (Avalon Hill, 1964), using step reduction and breakthroughs à la Anzio (Avalon Hill, 1968)." Palmer concluded, "Afrika Korps probably has more blood and thunder, but Rommel is probably more realistic and less luck-dependent."

In Issue 30 of Simulacrum, Martin Campion compared Rommel to another wargame published in 1973, Desert Fox (Cavalier Games, 1973), and found that "[Rommel] is easier to play with fewer things to keep track of, and it gives less of an illusion of realism. " Campion concluded, "Both Desert Fox and Rommel start the game with the first British offensive against the Italians, who thus have the opportunity to preserve something from the rout or to lose even worse than the original Italians."
