= 1989 in games =

This page lists board and card games, wargames, miniatures games, and tabletop role-playing games published in 1989. For video games, see 1989 in video gaming.

== Games released or invented in 1989 ==
- BattleTroops
- Cyberspace (role-playing game)
- Death By Diet
- HeroQuest
- Prince Valiant (role-playing game)
- Quicksand
- Red Storm Rising
- Shadowrun (role-playing game)
- Taboo
- Teenagers from Outer Space (2nd edition)

== Game awards given in 1989 ==
- Spiel des Jahres: Café International

== Significant game-related events in 1989 ==
- Coleco declared bankruptcy, and was acquired by Hasbro.

== Deaths ==
Date	Name	Age	Notability
April 14	Laurence Meynell	89	Author who designed the card game I Commit (1948)
June 25	Stephen D. Hassenfeld	47	Chairman and CEO of Hasbro

== See also ==
- 1989 in video gaming
