= Fontenoy 1745 =

Fontenoy 1745 is a 1996 board game published by Vae Victis.

== Gameplay ==
Fontenoy 1745 is a game in which a linear‑formation wargame has French and Allied commands alternate artillery fire, movement, and combat through rigid line‑based operations that model the chaos, discipline, and timing of the 1745 battle.

== Reception ==
Perfidious Albion felt that "To conclude, a splendid looking game on a less-than-exciting topic than maximises its potential. This potential is not great though, and I doubt we will see many repeat playings. The simulation of the realities of combat is not high but it is hobby standard, and the rules have subtle touches that achieve much of what others have strained to cover. A fears for the eyes, and an encouragement to do better. All for a few pounds, no wonder these games are popular."
