= Ancient Conquest II =

Ancient Conquest II is a 1978 board game published by Excalibre Games.

== Gameplay ==
Ancient Conquest II is a game in which a large, twenty‑turn campaign sees Macedonia, Persia, Sparta, and Athens maneuver across an expanded map.

== Reception ==
Perfidious Albion felt that "somehow the game's enormous strengths had died under a welter of poor sub-systems."

== Reviews ==
Craft, Model & Hobby Industry
