= Imperial Governor & Strategos =

Imperial Governor & Strategos is a 1979 wargame published by Ariel Productions Ltd/Philmar.

== Gameplay ==
Imperial Governor & Strategos is a game in which two distinct games are featured.

- Imperial Governor (IG) is a multiplayer (3–6 players) game set in the last three centuries B.C., emphasizing diplomacy over complex mechanics. Players manage revenue, form alliances, and engage in combat using leaders and fleets. Fate cards introduce random events, affecting financial gains, colony revolts, and naval storms. Cities provide defensive bonuses, but there are no siege mechanics. Victory is determined by either total accumulated revenue or revenue growth. Gift cards, bearing thematic mottoes, facilitate diplomacy.
- Strategos modifies IG for two players, simulating the Peloponnesian War. Unlike IG, it lacks diplomacy and fate phases, focusing on Spartan-Athenian conflict. Revenue is divided into separate numbers for armies and fleets. The game spans 32 years, broken into 8-month turns, with the first two years dedicated to empire-building under a truce. Persia may intervene if Asia Minor colonies are taken. Spartans raid Athenian crops yearly for revenue. To win, a player must besiege the opponent's home city for three turns with land and naval forces. Forts influence revenue, and only Athens can build fortified bases using ships in Spartan territory. Islands provide naval revenue exclusively.

== Reception ==
John Lambshead reviewed Imperial Governor & Strategos in Perfidious Albion #43 (December 1979) and stated that "IG is dull and slow, partly because it takes players too long to come into contact, even with accelerated start rules. I feel that these rules indicate a problem with the designer's attitude. When faced with a design problem he has tended to use 'cosmetic' rules to solve it rather than tinkering with the mechanics of the game. Unfortunately the game is also slow to play. I suspect part of the problem is the low movement abilities of leaders, preventing swift lunges (tough luck on budding Alexanders). The final kiss of death, as far as I am concerned, is the lack of interesting victory conditions." Lambshead further commented on Strategos that "So to conclude, I object to this game. To describe it as a simulation is virtually an offense under the Trade Descriptions Act. This, the second attempt at the Peloponnesian War, is decidedly inferior to the SimCan version which, whatever its's [sic] faults, was a genuine attempt at a simulation."
