= Onslaught (board game) =

1987 wargame by TSR

- Publishers: TSR, Inc.
- Publication: 1987; 39 years ago
- Genres: Board wargame
- Players: 2
- Setup time: 10 minutes
- Playing time: 90–120 minutes
- Chance: Medium
- Age range: 12+
- Skills: Strategic planning, resource management, tactical movement

Onslaught is a strategic board wargame published in 1987 by TSR, Inc. The game simulates the Allied forces' campaign in Western Europe during World War II, starting from the D-Day landings in Normandy and culminating in the crossing of the Rhine River.

== Contents ==
Onslaught is a game in which the Allies of World War II push from the beaches of Normandy in June 1944, and ten months later cross the Rhine river.

== Reception ==
Norman Smith reviewed Onslaught for Games International magazine, and gave it 5 stars out of 5, and stated that "This game is just what the hobby needs at the moment: a solid design that serves as an excellent introductory game and also a superb game for regular wargamers. It plays well solitaire and can be played in an evening."

== Reviews ==
- Casus Belli #46 (Aug 1988)
