= Emperor of China (game) =

Emperor of China is a 1972 wargame published by Dynamic Games.

== Gameplay ==
Emperor of China is a game in which the unification of China is depicted.

== Reception ==
Bob Campbell reviewed Emperor of China in Perfidious Albion #13 (January 1977) and stated that "If E of C were selling at the same price as Risk, I could recommend it as a subtler, more moral version." Three issues later, Tony Dinsdale disagreed, writing, "the game does nothing to capture even the atmosphere of the period. Indeed, one could take away all references to China, shift the provinces round a bit, keep the exact same game system and call it Invasion Earth ... the game is poor value for money and the game-system is odourous."
