= Viva Zapata! (game) =

Viva Zapata! is a 1982 board game published by Editions du Stratège.

== Gameplay ==
Viva Zapata! is a wargame in which Mexican rebels fight the Mexican government.

== Reviews ==
- Casus Belli
- Jeux & Stratégie
