= Austerlitz 1805: Le choc des cavaleries =

Austerlitz 1805: Le choc des cavaleries is a 1995 board game published by Vae Victis.

== Gameplay ==
Austerlitz 1805: Le choc des cavaleries is a game in which gameplay centers on maneuvering units across dense terrain to resolve fire, combat, and morale interactions that simulate the chaotic ebb and flow of the Austerlitz battlefield.

== Reception ==
Perfidious Albion felt that "Given its price and stye I can only recommend it. I believe it is sufficiently transparent a design to permit those of you who disagree with it to amend with ease [...] Gentlemen, at all times permit me to assure you of my most distinguished sentiments."
