= U-Boat (wargame) =

1977 WWII naval board wargame

- Publishers: Tabletop Games
- Publication: 1977
- Genres: WWII Naval

U-Boat is a board wargame published by Tabletop Games in 1977 that simulates a convoy crossing the Atlantic in 1942 at the height of the Battle of the Atlantic.

== Description ==
U-Boat is a board wargame for 2 players in which one player controls an Allied convoy and its escorts and the other player controls a pack of German U-boats. Although the game has counters to represent ships and submarines, it does not have a map. Like the Avalon Hill game Jutland (1967), players use any flat surface and measure the distance between counters using a tape measure. Critic Martin Campion noted "preferably metric."

=== Gameplay ===
Each game lasts ten turns, and begins with the Allied convoy (six cargo ships and two tankers defended by three corvettes and one frigate) entering the playing surface from one edge. Three German submarines enter the playing surface from the other edges. Each turn, the convoy player must write movement orders for the corvettes and frigate. (The convoy follows a predetermined zigzag.)

The game then becomes one of submarines firing spreads of torpedoes, while the corvettes and frigate try to pinpoint the location of submarines using Asdic, and then drop depth charges on suspected locations.

=== Victory conditions ===
The German player receives victory points for sinking Allied ships and loses points for submarines that are destroyed. A positive score is a German victory, a negative score is an Allied victory.

== Publication history ==
U-Boat was released by Tabletop Games in 1977. It was also co-released the same year with different cover art by Tabletop and Heritage Models.

This game is not connected to the identically named U-Boat board wargame created by Charles S. Roberts and published by Avalon Hill in 1959.

== Reception ==
In Issue 30 of the British wargaming magazine Perfidious Albion, Peter Bartlam commented, "I find this game very exciting; you certainly get more of the feel of the thing than the abstract losses of Wolf Pack [Taurus Games, 1975] ... There's certainly plenty of action, my last game saw 10 of the 16 vessels involved sunk! Unrealistic? Maybe, but it sure is fun." Bartlam concluded, "All in all, good value for money at just over £1."

In The Guide to Simulations/Games for Education and Training, Martin Campion commented, "The game covers a typical battle between a small Atlantic convoy of three to eight transports and tankers and one to four escort vessels, and an attacker with one to four submarines ... The convoy and escorts cannot change their routine until a U-boat is spotted."
