= The Siege of Leningrad (game) =

WWII board wargame

- Cover of JagdPanther #13
- Designers: Stephen V. Cole; Howard Anderson; Allen D. Eldridge
- Publishers: JagdPanther Publications
- Publication: 1976
- Genres: World War II East Front

The Siege of Leningrad is a board wargame published by JagdPanther Publications in 1976 that simulates the Siege of Leningrad during World War II.

== Background ==
During Germany's invasion of Russia in August 1941 (Operation Barbarossa), the capture of Leningrad was one of three strategic goals and as a result, Leningrad was the main target of Army Group North. Leningrad was surrounded by September 1941, beginning a destructive three-year siege.

== Description ==
The Siege of Leningrad is a two-player board wargame in which one player controls Axis forces (primarily German and Finnish units), and the other player defends the Russian city.

=== Components ===
The unmounted 16' x 28" hex grid map covers the area around Leningrad from Tikhvin to Lake Peipus, scaled at 10.5 km (6.5 mi) per hex; 144 die-cut counters represent the military units, including infantry, mechanized units, artillery and engineers.

=== Gameplay ===
The game uses a modified "I Go, You Go" set of alternating turns first developed for Kursk: Operation Zitadelle (Simulations Publications, 1971):

German Phase:

1. Reinforcement Phase
2. Supply Determination Phase
3. Movement Phase
4. Supply Determination Phase
5. Combat Phase
6. Mechanized Movement Phase

The Soviet player then has the same opportunity. This completes 10 days in game time.

There are special rules for Railroads, Soviet engineers, Weather, German airpower, Soviet artillery, German Supply Units, and supplying Leningrad.

=== Movement and combat ===
A unit (or a stack of units) cannot voluntarily move next to a stronger enemy force. Movement and combat for both sides are dependent on supplies.

=== Scenarios ===
A total of five scenarios are included in the game:

1. Breakthrough on the Luga Front, 1 Jul–17 Sep 1941 (8 Turns)
2. Battle in Northern Russia, 18 Sep–5 Dec 1941 (9 Turns)
3. The Siege of Demyansk, 12 Jan–22 Apr 1942 (10 Turns)
4. The 2nd Battle of Lake Ladoga, 28 Nov 1942– 26 Feb 1943 (8 Turns)
5. The Destruction of Army Group North, 29 Nov 1943 – 27 March 1944 (12 Turns)

== Publication history ==
The Siege of Leningrad was designed by Stephen V. Cole, Howard Anderson, and Allen D. Eldridge, and was published as a free pull-out game in Issue 13 of JagdPanther. In 2014, Kokusai-Tsushin Co., Ltd. (国際通信社) published a Japanese-language version in Issue 117 of Command magazine. The following year, Amarillo Design Bureau released a PDF version of the original game.

== Reception ==
In Issue 10 of Perfidious Albion, Geoff Barnard and Charles Vasey traded views about the game. Barnard commented, "This turns out to be a very interesting game, both from the point of view of the special rules and the scenarios. The structure of the game and the rules have the potential to lead to a fast game assuming one can overcome the supply problems and break any enemy strongpoints. This however can be very difficult." Vasey replied, "A rather interesting approach to the campaign. You cannot supply all the front, and thus must make important decisions as to how your campaign will be conducted." Barnard concluded, "A good representation of the situation in the generally forgotten northern sector of the Eastern Front." Vasey concluded, "Lots of neat touches that will appeal to the Barbaraossa - buff, and it's quite painless for non-WWII gamers."

In his 1977 book The Comprehensive Guide to Board Wargaming, Nick Palmer noted, "Combat hinges on intelligent maneuver as units may not stack adjacent to stronger units. Supply for Leningrad is handled at length to simulate the siege. Luftwaffe, winter, the Ice Road, and sensible supply rules." Palmer concluded, "A good, clean east front game, about the most dramatic siege of the war, incidentally the only one to generate a symphony (by Shostakovich), played for the first time by radio broadcasting from the embattled city."

In a retrospective review in Issue 26 of Simulacrum, Brian Train wrote, "This is a fairly simple game along the lines of the Kursk system [Simulations Publications] was doing at the time: approximately division level units, move-fight-mechanized move sequence of play, and an odds-based [Combat Results Table] with voluntary combat. Chromy bits come in when Leningrad is cut off – they include an engineer division which can create a notional railway line to Leningrad when the regular tracks are cut, and an important special rule dealing with supply stocks within Leningrad itself, which must be used to supply units on the defence or attack."
