= The English Civil War (board game) =

Board game

The English Civil War is a board wargame that was published by Philmar in 1978.

== Description ==
Box cover art

The English Civil War is a strategic level wargame simulating the English Civil War, designed by Roger Sandell and Hartley Patterson.

The game differs from most wargames of the time in its distribution of units. In this game, each player must allocate troops to the left wing, centre and right wing. The combat between the cavalry troops in the wings (left versus right, right versus left) are resolved first. If any cavalry units are left, they can then be sent to help in the centre.

The game components are:

- 49 cm by 61 cm mounted map
- thin coverstock counters for military units
- 20-page rulebook (The last two pages are removed and used as tactical combat displays)

== Reception ==
In Issue 7 of Perfidious Albion, Geoff Barnard and Charles Vasey exchanged thoughts about this game compared to the rival game Cromwell (SDC, 1976). Barnard commented, "In some ways this game is more detailed than Cromwell, and these details are well worth including from the point of view of realism. The game misses out, on the other hand, the differentiation between infantry types, but this does not seem to affect the result very much." Vasey replied, "This game is far less certain than Cromwell. ... One cannot estimate how to win by a 'surround and kill' policy. Though on the surface the game is much simpler than Cromwell, in its combat system it has the advantage of having been well thought out, and the end result is often more accurate and well defined."

In the July 1979 edition of Dragon (Issue #27), Tim Kask found the cover art on the box to be "the most wretched piece of artwork I have ever seen on a game box." He was also not a fan of the game counters, finding that they "leave much to be desired, not in their printing, nor even in their coloring." However, Kask found the actual game to be "simple, it has some interesting innovations, plays well, play fairly quickly [...] and has some interesting objectives and mode of play." He concluded with a thumbs up, saying, "I would recommend the game highly to anyone interested in either this period of history or in [...] an interesting area movement game — fast moving, fun to play and easy to pick up."

Reviewer David Cox was ambivalent about the game, saying, "English Civil War is not the worst game that I have played. Nor is it the ugliest game that I have played. It is probably a reasonable simulation of the war." He found the use of a lot of dice created "a loss of control by the players and luck will play a big role." He concluded that this game would probably be "a must-have item" for English Civil War buffs, but warned others that "If you are looking for an exciting and easy game to play you probably should avoid this one. If you see it cheap in a garage sale by all means purchase it. Then give it to a friend and play it when you go and visit him."

In the 1977 book The Comprehensive Guide to Board Wargaming, game critic Charles Vasey called the game "rather long but quite accurate, with a very good tactical module."

== Reviews ==
- Games & Puzzles #74
