= Santa Cruz (game) =

1976 WWII naval wargame

- Designers: Bryce Pointer
- Publishers: SoPac Games
- Publication: 1976
- Genres: WWII Naval

Santa Cruz is a board wargame published by SoPac Games in 1976 that simulates naval combat during the Pacific Campaign of World War II.

== Gameplay ==
Santa Cruz is a game in which ship combat in and around Guadalcanal during World War II is detailed. On the large strategic map, players must use airplanes to first find opposing task forces. The two sides can then close for tactical combat using a separate "manoeuvre map". In addition to various grades of warships, players can utilize torpedo bombers and dive bombers.

There are optional rules for items such as more complex combat, critical hits, extra units, damage control, fighter combat, and different strategic objectives, as well as "experimental" rules for wind and rain.

Five short scenarios are provided to allow players to learn the rules.

== Publication history ==
Santa Cruz was designed by Bryce Pointer and published by SoPac Games in 1976.

== Reception ==
In Issue 20 of the British wargaming magazine Perfidious Albion, Cliff Sayre Jr. thought the rules were "clearly written and fairly well organized. When playing the advanced rules it is sometimes difficult to recall or find which of the basic rules still apply." Sayre concluded, "All;-in-all the game is nicely done. It is not of SPI or GDW level of quality, but it IS a well conceived game and game system ... for an initial effort of a new company, Santa Cruz is a game which offers some new ideas and a playable game system."

In his 1980 book The Best of Board Wargaming, Nick Palmer noted that the game was "very amateurish in appearance: with a garish yellow box design, die-cut counters, and simple blue-and-black maps ... The rules are typewritten." Despite this, Palmer went on to say, "the thought that has gone into the game is quite impressive." Palmer concluded by giving the game an Excitement Grade of 80%.

== Other reviews and commentary ==
- Fire & Movement #7
