= Overlord (wargame) =

1973 WWII board wargame

1st edition box cover, 1973

Overlord, subtitled "The Normandy Invasion", is a board wargame published by Conflict Games in 1973 that simulates the Normandy landings and the subsequent attempt by the Germans to prevent the Allies from breaking out of Normandy during World War II.

== Background ==
On 6 June 1944, Allied forces landed on Normandy beaches and began a month-long struggle to force their way out of Normandy and begin the march to Germany.

== Description ==
Overlord is a two-player wargame in which one player controls Allied invaders, and the other player controls German defenders. The game covers the period of 6 June to 28 August in 28 turns.

=== Components ===
The game box contains:

- 20" x 23" paper hex grid map scaled at 5 km (3 mi) per hex
- 304 die-cut counters
- 4-page rulebook
- errata sheet
- various charts and player aids

=== Gameplay ===
The game uses a simple alternating "I Go, You Go" system of movement and combat:

1. German Movement
2. German Combat
3. Allied Movement
4. Allied Combat

The Allied player has a given number of air points, which can be used each turn to aid attacks. Any unused air points can be used to make road travel more costly for German units. The Allies can also use naval bombardment to either aid in attacks or in defense within a certain distance of the beachhead.

=== Victory conditions ===
The Allies must exit nine divisions from the east side of the board by the end of Turn 28 to win. The Germans win by preventing this.

== Publication history ==
Inspired by game designer Richard Berg, game store owner John Hill turned to game designing in the early 1970s, and one of his first games was Overlord, published by Hill's company Conflict Games in 1973.

In a 1976 poll conducted by Simulations Publications Inc. to determine the most popular wargame in North America, Overlord placed 109th out of 202 games.

Conflict Games published a second edition with new box art in 1977. Diseños Orbitales published a Spanish language edition titled Día D: Operación Overlord in 1992.

== Reception ==
In the December 1974 issue of Airfix Magazine, Bruce Quarrie was generally impressed with the game, saying, "One attractive feature of Conflict games, especially for newcomers to board wargaming, is the simplicity of their rules, and this [game] is no exception, even though naval gunfire support and air power are taken into account as well as action on the ground."

In the inaugural edition of Phoenix, Peter Bolton called Overlord and its sister game Kasserine Pass (another John Hill game, published in 1972) "clean, highly enjoyable games [where] victory conditions can go either way." Bolton noted that "Because of the terrain giving the Germans excellent defensive positions early in the game, the battle tends to follow within reason the actual fighting." However, he believed that Overlord was imbalanced in favor of the Allies — "the game assumes the Allies will eventually prevail."

In Issue 29 of the British wargaming magazine Perfidious Albion, Charles Vasey and Geoffrey Barnard discussed this game. Vasey commented, "A simple game this, although with a surprising amount of flavour. The map is probably too small for the geography of Normandy ... Like all [designer John] Hill's games this is good fun for those who do not live only for the last war. For the buff it will doubtless fail to please." Barnard replied, "Quite a fun game, which includes nearly all the essential elements of the campaign in Normandy in a straightforward, well constructed game. It's not to be taken very seriously though, because as a simulation it is very simplistic."

In The Guide to Simulations/Games for Education and Training, Richard Rydzel noted, "This is an interesting game, but it leaves no room for tactics and maneuvers. It is basically a slugging match with the winner being the player who inflicts the most losses." Ryzdel concluded " This is a quick and easy game to learn and play but there are better simulations available on this subject."

== Other reviews and commentary ==
- Panzerfaust #59
- Campaign #84
- The Grenadier V.2 #1
