= War of the Star Slavers =

Board game

- Designers: Dave Casciano
- Illustrators: Besson Studio
- Publishers: Attack Wargaming Association
- Publication: 1977
- Genres: Science fiction

War of the Star Slavers is a science fiction space combat board game published by Attack Wargaming Association in 1977. Critics were generally unimpressed with the poor quality of the components and the badly-written rules.

== Description ==
War of the Star Slavers, designed by Dave Casciano, is a science fiction game in which players can take on the roles on one of two Empires, or become a Star Slaver. The game components are:

- a scenario outline
- two empire commerce charts
- over 200 cardstock counters representing ships and cargos
- four 12.75" x 10.5" hex maps representing a star cluster, totalling 114 hexes wide by 80 hexes long
- a 12-page rule folder
- a large 15" x 12" ziplock bag to hold the game

=== Setting ===
The Ascarian and Dracko Empires are weakened after a mutually destructive war. Despite their distrust of each other, they must trade, running cargo ships through the demilitarized zone. Here, undefended by either space navy, the cargo ships fall prey to the piratical Star Slavers. The four-section map delineates the star systems belonging to the two Empires, as well as features that will affect space travel like gas clouds and gravity wells.

=== Gameplay ===
The Empire players each have assorted warships and cargo ships, and their own timetable of commercial runs. Each Empire player tries to complete as many profitable runs as possible, vying to earn more money than the other Empire. Empire players can also try to hunt down Slavers, since one less Slaver means a better chance for their cargo to arrive safely.

Each Star Slaver has an armed cruiser, and must intercept and destroy cargo ships in order to take their cargo. Once a Star Slaver has cargo, the ship can proceed to any planet in the Neutral Zone or one of the Empires to sell it. The Star Slaver will get a better price in one of the Empires, but at greater risk of being jumped by an Empire warship. Out of their earnings, Star Slavers must pay for their crew, as well as any necessary repairs to their ships.

=== Movement ===
There are two types of movement:

- Rocket Movement, which moves any unit 1 hex per turn.
- Hyper Jump, which moves a unit a varying amount according to its rating. A destroyer can jump 10 hexes, a freighter only 2 hexes.

Hyper Jumps must be plotted three turns in advance.

=== Combat ===
Every ship has a certain number of Null guns, a number of defence shields, and an integrity rating. The difference between the number of Null guns attacking and the number of shields on the target is indexed against the range on the Combat Results Table (CRT). Each resultant hit reduces the target's Integrity by one. When a ship's Integrity reaches zero, it is destroyed, and its cargo is left in space to be picked up.

=== Diplomacy ===
Any player can make any agreement with any other player, as long as it doesn't contravene the game rules. Reviewer Gary Porter noted as an example that a Star Slaver could reach an agreement with the Ascarians to only attack Dracko ships.

=== Victory conditions ===
Victory conditions vary from scenario to scenario, but generally the two Empires try to outperform the other, and Slavers attempt to earn 200 credits of net profit in order to retire.

== Reception ==
In Issue 5 of GIGO, Greg Costikyan called Star Raiders "a rotten game ... The rules were apparently written by the chimpanzee-and-typewriter system. The number of typos, grammatical errors, etc ad nauseum is exactly that. The rules are badly written and badly organized. They explain nothing; they are incomplete. They are, for the most part, unintelligible."

In the June–July 1977 edition of Moves (Issue 33), Phil Kosnett criticized the amateurish components, pointing out the "poorly hand drawn two color counters."

In the August–September 1977 edition of White Dwarf (Issue #2), Gary Porter was very critical of the game, stating, "War of the Star Slavers is a badly flawed game. Ignoring such minor flaws as ambiguous rules and woolly presentation, we are left with such problems as the movement rules which just don't work." Porter also was not impressed by the quality of the components, pointing out that the ship counters are almost identical, meaning "players find themselves constantly cross-referring between board, rule book (where the profiles are defined), and scenario sheet (which contains the specs)." He admitted the game was "different and challenging," but concluded by giving the game an extremely poor rating of only 3 out of 10.
