= The African Campaign =

1973 WWII board wargame

- Designers: John Edwards
- Publishers: Jedko; Avalon Hill
- Publication: 1973
- Genres: WWII board wargame

The African Campaign is a board wargame published by the Australian game company Jedko Games in 1973 that simulates the North African Campaign during World War II. The game design was based on Avalon Hill's popular wargame Afrika Korps, but Avalon Hill recognized some improvements had been made to the game, and became the North American distributor of Jedko games including this one.

== Description ==
The African Campaign is a two-player wargame in which one player takes the role of Allied forces, and the other controls the Axis forces. The game begins in December 1940, when Italian troops under General Rodolfo Graziani dug in instead of advancing towards the strategically important Suez Canal, allowing the British to counterattack. The game ends in January 1943, following the Second Battle of El Alamein.

=== Gameplay ===
The game uses a standard "I Go, You Go" mechanic, where the Allied forces move and then attack. The Axis forces then move and attack. This completes one turn, which represents two weeks of game time. There are also rules for ports, air power, flak units, and minefields. The game is 50 turns long, representing the entire campaign between December 1940 and January 1943. There are no shorter scenarios included with the game. Despite its length, game critic Nicky Palmer called it a "brisk" game.

=== Movement ===
Units move the number of hexes indicated on their counter. The exception is "Strategic Movement", where any unit that begins and ends its turn outside of an enemy zone of control can double its movement.

=== Combat ===
The game uses a "step-reduction" mechanic, where damage taken reduces a unit's effectiveness by a step at a time, until finally, after several hits, the unit is eliminated.

=== Supply ===
All units must be able to trace an unbroken line a maximum of 15 hexes to a supply source or a friendly road that leads to a supply source. Each turn, the Axis player must roll a die to determine how much fuel made it through the Allied naval blockade.

=== Victory conditions ===
The Axis player wins by moving 12 combat factors off the eastern edge of the board before December 1942, but must keep them in supply for two turns after they leave the board. The Allied player wins by either preventing the Axis victory conditions, or by eliminating all Axis units on the board.

== Publication history ==
In 1968, John Edwards was visiting a friend in the United States and came across a copy of Avalon Hill's Akrika Korps. Edwards took the game home and, not knowing any other wargamers, played it solitaire for several months. In 1971, Edwards reached an agreement with Avalon Hill to become their Australian import agent, but Edwards soon realized that the Australian import tax of 52% made Afrika Korps unaffordable. To overcome this, Edwards designed his first professional game, The African Campaign, a game based on Afrika Korps, and founded the publishing company Jedko in 1973 to print and publish the game in Australia. Avalon Hill realized that the game was not a photocopy of Afrika Korps — Edwards had made enough substantive improvements that The African Campaign was now a different game. Edwards and Avalon Hill reached an agreement that Avalon Hill would print and distribute copies of The African Campaign in North America.

In 1985, Jedko produced a second edition of The African Campaign. In 2000, the Japanese publisher Kokusai-Tsushin Co., Ltd. (国際通信社) published a Japanese language edition of the game in Issue 31 of the wargame magazine Command Japan.

== Reception ==
In a 1976 poll conducted by SPI to determine the most popular board wargames in North America, The African Campaign, which was not widely known in North America, was rated only 169th out of 202 games.

Writing in the inaugural issue of The Brutus Bulletin, American player John Michalski, who owned an Australian copy of the game, lauded Avalon Hill for making it available to North America. Michalski called the game "about as close to a perfect-playing wargame as I expect one could find." Michalski liked the clarity of the rules, noting, "The rules to AC are a masterpiece: if you know what a zone of control is and how to make an attack, you can read the whole booklet in ten minutes and sit down to play at once, including all the optional rules ... The game is simple and fast-moving, a masterpiece in the old 'Classics' school of games." Michalski's only complaint with the game was that he could not find enough other players who were familiar with the game.

In Issue 3 of the European wargaming magazine Europa, Leo Niehorster called this "A very fast moving game." Niehorster found the rules "simple and easy to remember" especially compared to Afrika Korps. Niehorster noted that due to several other North African game produced at the same time, "It is a pity that the glut of North African games will undoubtedly screen this otherwise fine game games produced in 1973." Niehorster concluded, "Especially recommended for beginners and intermediates, who like easy, fast and quite realistic games; better than Afrika Korps, just as easy to learn as Afrika Korps. Well worth the money, if you can afford it, and like this type of game."

In Issue 30 of Simulacrum, Martin Campion did not feel that The Africa Campaign stood out from several other North African campaign games produced in 1973, saying, "The only really interesting thing about this game is that it comes from Australia. It is a playable game, although unbalanced, [but] without enough different ideas to make the player turn away from Afrika Korps."

== Other reviews and commentary ==
- Panzerfaust and Campaign #74
- Campaign #81
