= Battle-Cry (Milton Bradley game) =

1961 U.S. Civil War board game

Battle Cry
- Other names: Game of the Civil War
- Illustrators: James Walker
- Publishers: Milton Bradley
- Publication: 1961; 65 years ago
- Years active: 1961–?
- Genres: Board game
- Languages: English
- Players: 2–4
- Playing time: 60'
- Age range: 10+

Battle-Cry is a combat board game set in the American Civil War that was published by the Milton Bradley Company in 1961 as part of their popular American Heritage series.

== Description ==
Battle-Cry is a two-player board game between units representing the Union and Confederate armies. There are also special rules for a 4-player game.

=== Components ===
- square-grid map is of the Eastern United States at the time of the American Civil War.
- 44 playing pieces (22 blue, 22 gray)
- rulebook
- two six-sided dice

=== Set up ===
Each player begins with 22 color-coded counters (10 infantry, 10 cavalry and 2 artillery), which are set up on the map on specified starting locations.

=== Movement ===
The active player rolls two 6-sided dice; the resultant total can be allocated as movement to any units. Infantry moves one square per dice pip, cavalry moves two squares per pip. Any unit reaching a mountain square must stop for the rest of the turn. Units at a railway station can each use 1 movement to immediately move to the next station.

=== Combat ===
The attacker lines up a column of pieces either horizontally or vertically to attack an enemy column. In order to begin combat, the attacker's column must have numerical superiority, calculated as 2 points for each infantry and artillery unit, and 1 point for cavalry units. All units in the defending column are eliminated, and the rear-most unit in the attacker's column is moved to the front of the attacker's column.

=== Victory conditions ===
The first side to eliminate all enemy pieces is the winner.

== Publication history ==
Battle Cry was published as a cooperative effort between Milton Bradley and American Heritage to mark the 100th anniversary of the American Civil War. It was one of a series of four collaborative games that the two companies published, the others being Hit the Beach (a Pacific Theater of World War II-based island hopping title), Broadside (a naval game set during the War of 1812), and Dogfight (a World War I air combat game). Although the designer was not credited, box cover art was by James Walker.

Battle Cry was reprinted in the 1970s.

== Reception ==
- In the paper La simulación histórica y la historia militar, Antonio Catalán called the American Heritage series, of which Battle Cry was one, a significant development in the study of conflict through simulations.
- In the essay The War in Cardboard and Ink: Fifty Years of Civil War Board Games (published in the 2014 book The Civil War in Popular Culture: Memory and Meaning), Alfred Wallace noted that this game "was almost certainly the best-selling game on the Civil War."
- The website The Player's Aid noted that this was "a really good and fun game." The reviewer found that "while the game is simple on the surface, there is definitely some hidden strategy and tactical acumen needed to be successful."

== Other recognition ==
A copy of Battle Cry is held in the collection of the Strong National Museum of Play (object 116.3755).
