= Conquest (board game) =

Abstract strategy board game published in 1972

- Cover of original 1972 edition
- Designers: Donald Benge
- Publishers: Self-published
- Publication: 1972
- Genres: Abstract strategy

Conquest is an abstract strategy board game created and published by Donald Benge that combines chess with a map board. First published in 1972 with cardboard counters, it evolved to plastic pieces as well as a deluxe set with pewter pieces plated in various metals including gold.

== Description ==
Conquest is a non-historical two-player game of conquest based on point to point movement and capture. Sid Sackson observed that it had been "created to fill the gap between chess and the hexagonal grid war games." The map features four islands where roads, sea lanes, and bridges allow movement in and around them. Each player starts with 20 land pieces — soldiers, elephants, chariots, and knights — each with different capabilities; and 6 ship pieces. Pieces can be stacked; for example, a soldier can mount a chariot, and both can then board a ship.

The object of the game is either to occupy all five spaces in the opponent's capital city, or to capture all the opponent's land pieces.

=== Gameplay ===
Players place their pieces in and around their capital. As in chess, the white pieces move first.

Landing on an enemy piece captures it, but any opposing piece within one or two moves of the capturing piece can be used to make a recapture, after which the original player continues his turn.

Each player can move twenty spaces per turn (ten on White's first turn). These moves can be distributed among the pieces as the player wishes, subject to a piece's move limitation — a foot soldier can only move two spaces, while a chariot can move eight.A unit may not move more than once per turn unless it captures or gives check (in either case the opponent has the right to immediately recapture if possible or otherwise parry a check). If a piece makes a capture, it can move its full movement allowance again in the same turn if the player has action points left. After a capture, the opponent may attempt a recapture move.

=== Solitaire play ===
The game also includes a set of puzzles for solitaire play. Jon Freeman thought these were essential to learning the strategies of the game.

== Publication history ==
Conquest was designed by Donald Benge of Burbank, California, who self-published it in 1972. Two years later, Benge developed a four-player edition, also titled Conquest. The four-player version can be played as a free for all, or with two teams of two. Benge then published Conquest Plus, which introduced catapults and siege engines.

In 1977, Benge developed a chess variant called Quest Chess, based on principles from Conquest.

In 2006, Bütehorn Spiele (Buchholz Verlag), released a German-language edition. In 2006, Conquest Games released a new edition, Grand Conquest, which added camels and castles with moats, and introduced movement into the fields between the regular movement points.

On April 6, 2007, Benge was killed in a traffic accident by a drunk driver, and publishing activities were suspended until the rights to the game were bought by Numbskull Games in 2010.

== Reception ==
In Issue 2 of Command, Donald Agosta called the game "fast moving and excellent for people who enjoy chess, backgammon, etc." He did warn that "The hard-core wargamer would probably be disappointed with it, however."

In The Playboy Winner's Guide to Board Games, game designer Jon Freeman didn't like the capture/recapture rules, noting, "The effect of these two rules is to encourage movement in large defensible masses, which of course slows down the game and leads to stalemates of the old John Foster Dulles school of massive retaliation: two huge masses facing each other, each of which is afraid to move because of the escalating response any such move could engender." Freeman concluded, "While Conquest is not a really bad game, its virtues are not sufficient, in my opinion, to attract the attention of anyone except those with a particular interest in games of this general sort. Most gamers, I think could more profitably spend their time and money elsewhere."

In Issue 9 of Games, game designer Sid Sackson commented, "The rules can be learned in minutes and a game can usually be played inside of an hour and a half. Yet Conquest possesses a flavor of battle that compares favorably with that in the more complex and time-consuming hex war games, and still retains much of the clarity of chess." The editors of Games subsequently chose Conquest as one of their "Top 100 Games" in 1980, and again in 1981 and 1982, saying " This colorful game of medieval combat involves pure strategy and combination, yet it's virtually impossible to look more than a turn ahead The key is to develop an instinct for spotting strengths and weaknesses."

== Other recognition ==
A copy of Conquest is held in the collection of the Strong National Museum of Play (object 116.76330).

== Other reviews and commentary ==
- World Game Review #2
- Panzerfaust #61
