= 2001 in games =

This page lists board and card games, wargames, miniatures games, and tabletop role-playing games published in 2001. For video games, see 2001 in video gaming.

== Games released or invented in 2001 ==
- Adventure! (role-playing game)
- Apples to Apples - Expansion Set #3
- Apples to Apples Kids
- Axis & Allies: Pacific
- Best of Tribond
- Buffy the Vampire Slayer Collectible Card Game
- Capitol
- Carcassonne - The River
- Chez Geek 3 - Block Party
- Chrononauts: Lost Identities
- Clobber
- Combat Assault Vehicle
- Cosmic Coasters
- Cranium Cadoo
- Cranium Cadoo Booster Box
- Deluxe G.E.V.
- DVONN
- Entdecker - Exploring New Horizons
- Evo
- Fairy Meat - Clockwork Stomp
- Fallout: Warfare
- Fluxx Blanxx
- Forgotten Realms Campaign Setting for the 3rd edition Dungeons & Dragons tabletop role-playing game.
- Formula Dé Circuit 33 - 10th Anniversary
- Frag
- Fvlminata: Armed with Lightning
- Genso Suikoden Card Stories
- GIPF Project Set 1
- GIPF Project Set 2
- Girl Genius: The Works
- Grave Robbers From Outer Space
- Hacker: Deluxe Edition
- HackMaster (role-playing game)
- Harry Potter Trading Card Game
- Hive
- Illuminati: Brainwash (re-release)
- Imperium, 3rd Millennium
- Jedi Knights Trading Card Game
- John Prados' Third Reich
- Little Fears - The Role-playing Game of Childhood Terror
- Lord of the Rings - Friends & Foes Expansion
- The Lord of the Rings Strategy Battle Game
- The Lord of the Rings Trading Card Game
- Medina
- The Metabarons Roleplaying Game
- Munchkin
- NFL Showdown
- Ninja Burger (role-playing game)
- Palazzo Paletti
- Panzer Grenadier: Airborne
- Panzer Grenadier: Heroes of the Soviet Union: The Defense of Mother Russia 1942-43
- ReCharge Collectible Card Game
- Reminiscing:the Movie Edition
- Risk 2210 A.D.
- Scattergories Platinum Edition
- Star Fleet Battle Force
- Starfarers of Catan 5-6 Player Expansion
- Starship Catan
- Stratego: Legends - Celestial Vengeance
- Stratego: Legends - Qa'ans Resurgence
- Taboo Junior
- TransAmerica
- Twilight Imperium: Armada
- Twilight Imperium: Armada: Stellar Matter
- Twilight Imperium: Hope's End
- Unexploded Cow
- Villa Paletti
- Warangel Card Game
- Warhammer 40,000 Collectible Card Game
- Warlord: Saga of the Storm
- Weird Wars (role-playing game)
- Wyatt Earp
- Z-G (collectible card game)
- Zombies!!!

== Game awards given in 2001 ==
- Spiel des Jahres: Carcassonne
- Games: Evo

== Significant game-related events in 2001 ==
- Mongoose Publishing was founded by Matthew Sprange and Alex Fennell.

== Deaths ==
Date	Name	Age	Notability
October 23	Josh Kirby	72	Role-playing game artist

== See also ==
- 2001 in video gaming
