= 2000 in games =

This page lists board and card games, wargames, miniatures games, and tabletop role-playing games published in 2000. For video games, see 2000 in video gaming.

== Games released or invented in 2000 ==
- 1898: The Spanish American War
- Aladdin's Dragons
- Apples to Apples Expansion Set #2
- Battle Cry
- Battleline
- Bible Tribond
- Blokus
- Blue Planet 2nd Edition (role-playing game)
- Carcassonne
- Cartagena
- Castle
- Chez Geek 2: Slack Attack
- Chrononauts
- Citadels
- Confrontation
- Cranium Booster Box 2
- Deadwood: Another Day, Another Dollar: Horror
- Deadwood: Another Day, Another Dollar: Kung Fu
- Deadwood: Another Day, Another Dollar: Musicals
- Deadwood: Another Day, Another Dollar: Space
- Diomin (role-playing game)
- Dragonball Z Collectible Card Game
- The El Grande Expansions
- Fairy Meat
- Full Thrust Fleet Book: Volume 2 (The Xeno Files)
- Gother Than Thou
- The Great Brain Robbery
- High Bohn
- Java
- Jenga Truth or Dare
- Lord of the Rings (board game)
- Magi-Nation Duel
- MLB Showdown
- Myths and Legends
- Pantheon (role-playing game)
- Pez Card Game
- The Pokéthulhu Adventure Game (1st edition)
- The Princes of Florence
- Rome at War I: Hannibal at Bay
- Sailor Moon Collectible Card Game
- Sketch!
- The Star Wars Roleplaying game (Wizards of the Coast version)
- Thunder on South Mountain
- Warangel
- X-Men Trading Card Game

== Game awards given in 2000 ==
- Spiel des Jahres: Torres
- Games: Aladdin's Dragons

== Significant game-related events in 2000 ==
- Privateer Press was founded by Brian Snōddy, Matt Staroscik and Matt Wilson.

== Deaths ==
Date	Name	Age	Notability
	Tony Bath		Wargaming author and founder of the Society of Ancients
February 13	James Cooke Brown	78	Author who designed the board game Careers
August 14	Michael 'Mike' Gilbert	53	illustrator

== See also ==
- 2000 in video gaming
