= 1999 in games =

This page lists board and card games, wargames, miniatures games, and tabletop role-playing games published in 1999. For video games, see 1999 in video gaming.

== Games released or invented in 1999 ==
- 7th Sea (role-playing game)
- Aberrant (role-playing game)
- All Flesh Must Be Eaten (role-playing game)
- Apples to Apples
- Austin Powers Collectible Card Game
- Axis & Allies: Europe
- Brave New World (role-playing game)
- Brawl
- Button Men
- Chez Geek
- CJ Carella's WitchCraft (role-playing game)
- Continuum: Roleplaying in the Yet
- Dao
- Dark•Matter (role-playing game)
- Deadwood
- DC Universe Roleplaying Game
- Feng Shui 2nd Edition (role-playing game)
- Furry Pirates (role-playing game)
- Great War at Sea: 1904-1905 The Russo-Japanese War
- Great War at Sea: US Navy Plan Black
- Hunter: The Reckoning (role-playing game)
- IceTowers
- India Rails
- The Jerry Springer Game
- Kobolds Ate My Baby! (role-playing game)
- Lejendary Adventure (role-playing game)
- Life as a BlackMan
- Lost Cities
- Paths of Glory: The First World War, 1914-1918
- Pokémon Trading Card Game
- Ra
- Return to the Keep on the Borderlands
- Ricochet Robots
- Risk - 40th anniversary collector's edition
- Schotten-Totten
- Starfarers of Catan
- Stratego: Legends
- Systems Failure (role-playing game)
- Tikal
- Torres
- Vinci
- The Wheel of Time (collectible card game)
- Young Jedi Collectible Card Game
- Yu-Gi-Oh! Trading Card Game (Japanese version)

== Game awards given in 1999 ==
- Concours International de Créateurs de Jeux de Société: Vinci
- Origins Awards: Button Men - Best Abstract Board Game and Best Graphic Presentation of a Board Game
- Games: Torres
- Spiel des Jahres: Tikal - Michael Kiesling and Wolfgang Kramer, Ravensburger

== Significant game-related events in 1999 ==
- Hasbro purchased Wizards of the Coast for US$325 million.
- Z-Man Games was incorporated by owner, Zev Schlasinger.

== Deaths ==
Date	Name	Age	Notability
August 7	J. Andrew Keith	40	RPG designer

== See also ==
- 1999 in video gaming
