= Sketch =

Sketch or Sketches may refer to:

- Sketch (drawing), a rapidly executed freehand drawing that is not usually intended as a finished work

== Arts, entertainment and media ==
- Sketch comedy, a series of short scenes or vignettes called sketches

=== Film and television ===
- Sketch (2007 film), a Malayalam film
- Sketch (2018 film), a Tamil film
- Sketch (2024 film), an American comedy film
- Sketch (TV series), a 2018 South Korean series
- "Sketch", a 2008 episode of Skins
  - Sketch (Skins character)
- Sketch with Kevin McDonald, a 2006 CBC television special

=== Literature ===
- Sketch story, or sketch, a very short piece of writing
- Daily Sketch, a British newspaper 1909–1971
- The Sketch, a British illustrated weekly journal 1893–1959

=== Music ===
- Sketch (music), an informal document prepared by a composer to assist in composition
- The Sketches, a Pakistani Sufi folk rock band

- Sketch (Ex Norwegian album), 2011
- Sketch (Lilas Ikuta album), 2023
- Sketch (EP), by Hyomin, 2016
- Sketches (album), by Bert Jansch, 1990
- Sketches, a 2008 album by Ane Brun
- Sketches, a 2012 EP by Newton Faulkner
- Sketches, a 1994 album by Vince Mendoza
- Sketches, a 1972 album by Chris Connor
- Sketches, a 2014 album by Inga and Anush Arshakyan
- Sketches, a 2023 EP by Fergus McCreadie

== Computing ==
- Sketch (software), a vector graphics editor
- Skencil, formerly Sketch, a vector graphics editor
- Sketch, an approximation of some statistics of probability distribution by a streaming algorithm
- Sketch, a program written with the Arduino IDE
- Sketch, a program written with the Processing IDE

== Mathematics ==
- Curve sketching, techniques for producing a rough idea of overall shape of a plane curve
- Sketch (mathematics), in the mathematical theory of categories

== People ==
- Katie Sketch, vocalist of band The Organ
- Jason Scott Sadofsky (born 1970), pseudonym Sketch, American archivist, filmmaker and performer
- Sketch (streamer) (born 1998 or 1999), American Twitch streamer and YouTuber

== Other uses ==
- Sketch (restaurant), a restaurant in London, England
- Sketch!, a tabletop game

== See also ==
- Sketchy (disambiguation)
