= Armada (board game) =

Board game

Cover of 1st edition, Jeux Descartes, 1986

Armada is a board game published by Jeux Descartes in 1986. After Jeux Descartes published a second edition, Eurogames published a third edition in 2001 that changed the theme of the game from colonisation to treasure-seeking pirates.

== Description ==
Cover of Armada 3, published by Eurogames, 2001

Armada is a game of maritime exploration and world domination for 2–4 players. Each player plays one of four island nations who want to explore an island in the center of the board.

=== Game components ===
The first and second editions of the game come with:

- 300 plastic markers
- 150 tokens
- eight 2-masted metal ships
- three special six-sided dice, one each for combat, indigenous people and gold
- rules booklet

The third edition adds a deck of 55 Action cards.

=== Set-up ===
In the first and second editions, the players play island nations on the edges of the map seeking to colonize a central island. In the third edition, each player is a pirate captain who is seeking buried treasure on the central island.

Each player chooses one of four colors, and is given 18 colonist/pirate markers, which are placed on the player's home island. Each player also receives two ships which are placed next to the player's home cities.

In the third edition of the game, each player also receives two Action cards.

=== Action Points ===
On each turn, the active player has ten Action Points that can be used in various ways:

- Colonist/Pirate counters can be moved from one space or ship onto an adjacent space or adjacent ship for one Action Point.
- Ships, which can hold a combination of 10 Colonist/Pirate counters and treasure counters, can be moved one space for one Action Point.
- If a player is able to move a counter onto a space on the central island, the player can spend one Action Point to roll the gold die and the indigenous peoples die to see how many of each are found in the area. A corresponding number of counters are placed in the area.
- The player can attempt to conquer an area that is either unclaimed by another player or already conquered by another player by spending one Action Point to move at least two colonist/pirate counters into the area. This initiates combat with either the indigenous people or the player who already claimed the land.
- If a player's ship is adjacent to another ship, the player can attack the other ship. Each combat die roll costs an Action Point.
- If a player reaches a city or trading post, the player can convert gold into new colonists/pirates for one Action point.

=== Combat ===
The attacking player, who must attack with at least two colonist/pirate counters, rolls the Combat die, which will indicate either how many Attacker or Defender counters must be removed from the board. The Attacking player can continue to attack until either the Attacking player decides not to spend any more Action Points on Combat die rolls; or the Attacker is reduced to only one colonist/pirate counter; or the defender's counters are reduced to zero.

If it is an area that was attacked, the area is marked with the player's color, and the conqueror moves any gold to one of the player's colonist/pirate counters.

If a ship was attacked, any goods on the captured ship remain on the ship unless moved to another ship by the attacker. If the attacker removes all their colonist/pirate counters from the captured shipo, it is considered sunk, and is removed from the board.

=== Action cards ===
In the third edition of the game, players can use Action cards at any time with no cost in Action Points. Although each player starts the game with two cards, players can buy an additional card during their turn for 2 gold and 2 Action Points.

=== Victory conditions ===
In order to win the game, a player either needs to

- own three trading posts in addition to their original home island
- conquer four cities owned by other players

== Publication history ==
Aramada was designed as a game of colonisation by Philippe des Pallieres and Patrice Pillet, and was published in 1986 by Jeux Descartes. A second edition with revised and corrected rules was also published by Jeux Descartes. A third edition, titled Armada 3, introduced a pirate theme to the game, and was published by Eurogames in 2001.

== Reception ==
In White Dwarf #89, Paul Cockburn reviewed the original edition, and pointed out that an aggressive strategy that was not foreseen by the designers might give an advantage: "I think the designers must have been a peaceable lot, because the simple tactic of jumping your opponent at the start of the game and nicking his ship was ignored. The advantage is with the attacker in even battles. If you lose your ship and you haven't any gold, you're 99% finished."

On the German game review site Spielphase, Claudia Schlee and Andreas Keirat were not impressed by the third edition of Armada, calling it "relatively boring" and "a dull conquering game". They concluded by giving it a poor rating of only 3 out of 10.

== Reviews ==
- Casus Belli #37 (April 1987)
- Jeux & Stratégie #43

== Awards ==
The first edition of Armada won the 1986 "Concours International de Créateurs de Jeux de Société".
