= Mike Fitzgerald (game designer) =

American game designer

- Occupation: Game designer

Mike Fitzgerald is a game designer who has worked primarily on collectible card games.

== Career ==
Mike Fitzgerald started designing games shortly after Magic: The Gathering came out in 1993. His first design was the trading card game Wyvern, which was published by U.S. Games. This resulted in a contract with Wizards of the Coast to do more designs, including the Nitro (WCW wrestling) and X-Men trading card games. He has worked for Pokémon USA, helping to put together the pre-constructed decks that are sold with every Pokémon expansion. Fitzgerald is also the designer of the Mystery Rummy series.

Fitzgerald also has a long and successful radio career as an on-air personality.
