= Wyvern (card game) =

Collectible card game

- Card back
- Designers: Mike Fitzgerald
- Publishers: U.S. Games Systems
- Players: 2
- Playing time: Approx 30 min
- Chance: Some
- Skills: Card playing Arithmetic; Basic Reading Ability

Wyvern is an out-of-print collectible card game featuring dragons and wyverns battling for treasure. The game was produced by U.S. Games Systems, with the first, "Premiere Limited", card set launched in January 1995. In 1997, the "Kingdom Unlimited" edition was released, featuring 277 cards, and marking the end of production.

== Game overview ==
Wyvern is a two player game with two decks per player (with each player supplying their own two decks). One of the decks, the Dragon Lair Draw Pile, consists of dragon and terrain cards. The other deck, the Treasure Horde Draw Pile, consists of action and treasure cards.

Players begin with 6 face-down dragon and terrain cards on the battlefield, as well as 25 gold painted pieces. The game ends when one player no longer has any dragon or terrain cards in play; this player is the loser. At the end of the game, a scoring system is used which rewards players for resourceful use of their assets (25 points + 1 [point for each gold piece remaining). The loser scores his remaining gold pieces divided by 2, rounded down. Multiple games are typically played to form a match, which ends when one player reaches a certain score. The objective is thus to defeat the opponent's army while expending as few of one's own resources as possible.

Each turn, players can perform limited card movement, play actions, and initiate a single battle. As play progresses, dragon and terrain cards which were turned face down are turned face up and the cost to do so is paid. Conceptually, one wants to defeat the opponent's cards using the appropriate counter-measures. Dragons defeat weaker dragons, but are vulnerable to terrain effects. Very weak dragons called scouts are designed to defeat terrain, but guessing where an opponent has a terrain card (when face-down) can be difficult. Dragons can be augmented with treasure for an additional cost, but running out of gold is a constant peril.

== Card types ==
- Dragon cards (red border) - Mythical dragons which form the bulk of each player's forces. Dragons typically have a gold piece cost associated with turning them face up (which must be done in order to make use of them).
- Terrain cards (green border) - Treacherous terrain, able to defeat or negatively impact certain dragons. If the terrain card negatively influences a dragon attacking it, the terrain card earns the owner gold pieces.
- Action cards (purple border) - Cards which can be used once to take some action, or in reaction to something happening. These cards also include dragon slayers, able to defeat certain face-up dragons.
- Treasure cards (yellow border) - Valuable treasure items and artifacts, often conveying some bonus to the dragon guarding them. Treasure cards are played face up behind dragons and terrain, and usually have a gold piece cost.

== Expansions ==
The initial card set for Wyvern was the "Premiere Limited" card set, launched in January 1995 and featuring 136 cards. The "Limited" edition, released in March 1995, expanded this number to 239 cards. The two expansion sets were dubbed "Phoenix" and "Chameleon", and consisted of 90 new cards each. In 1997, the "Kingdom Unlimited" edition was released, featuring 277 cards from the "Limited" edition and the "Phoenix" edition (in some cases with wording or cost changes/corrections).

== Deck construction ==
The rulebook indicates that each player's "Dragon Lair Draw Pile" must contain at least 15 cards, while the "Official Tournament Rules" require 20 cards, with no more than one of any given dragon. Similarly, the "Treasure Horde Draw Pile" must contain at least 35 cards per the rulebook, or 50 cards (with no more than 4 of any one card) per the tournament rules.

A non-tournament variant exists where players share a single set of two decks (presumably from a single player's collection). In this game mode, the "Dragon Lair Draw Pile" is recommended to contain at least 30 cards, while the "Treasure Horde Draw Pile" should contain at least 70 cards. Players share a single discard pile as well, so cards which allow one to retrieve cards from the discard pile can be used to obtain cards played by either player.

== Special Promotions ==
These were Ultra Rare cards inserted in random "Premiere Limited Edition" booster packs. The Gold Wyvern and The Silver (both card are #136) Wyvern Ultra-Rare Card were part of a Mail-in contest for the Premiere Edition only. They were redeemable for $15 USD for the Silver, $25 for the Gold, and $250 if redeeming a Silver/Gold set with the same Roman Numeral.

== Printing error ==
Due to a printing error a small number of Wyvern card backs were printed with fronts of cards from the Magic: The Gathering Fallen Empires expansion when the two games were being manufactured at the same factory. They are known to be distributed in Wyvern Limited Premiere starters, however some make claims they have opened them from Limited Premiere booster packs as well.

== Reception ==
In 1996 Mark Justice, a former champ of the 1995 U.S. National Magic tournament, won $1,000 for the 1996 Pacific Coast Championship for Wyvern. Previously, Justice had never played a game of Wyvern but remarked "It's basically Stratego with Giant Growths" and that "once he figured that out, it was simply a matter of applying the skills I learned in Magic."
