= Starship Catan =

Two-player card game

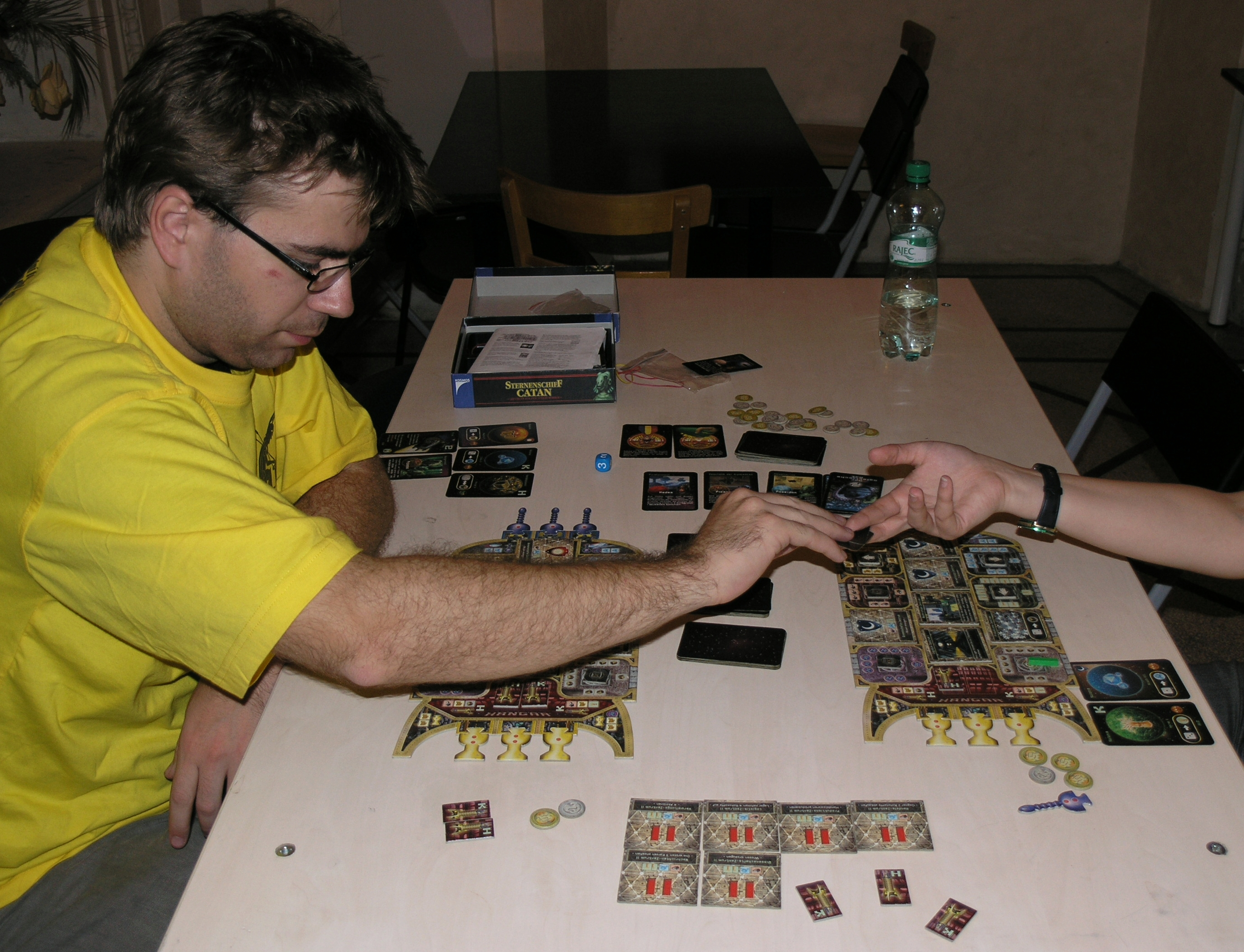
Starship Catan

Starship Catan is a two-player card game, loosely based on the Starfarers of Catan board game. As a member of the Catan family of games, it is designed by Klaus Teuber, and distributed by Kosmos in German and Mayfair Games in English.

Although the game is based on the Starfarers motif, the game only has superficial resemblances to Starfarers, unlike Settlers of Catan with the Catan Card Game. In this game, the two players represent two groups of Catanians who wish to return home to the Catan star system after getting lost through a wormhole. Aiding their quest are four alien races who have offered their assistance - these are four of the five alien races encountered in Starfarers. Like the other Catan games, the game is played to a set number of victory points - there is no assumption made as to whether either player returns home to Catan.

Like Starfarers, there are five basic resources in the game -- ore, wheat, fuel, trade goods, and carbon. Like the Catan Card Game, there are limits as to the amount of resources that can be collected, as well as the presence of a sixth resource - science.

== Preparation ==
At the start of the game, each player (described as either the sun player or the moon player after their respective insignias) begins with a lightly equipped starship, as well as a colony planet that has been donated to both players by the Green Folk, one of the alien races. Each player is also given 25 Astro, the local currency, from the Scientists, another alien race.

=== The Starship ===
Most of the game's crucial abilities, however, come from the starship itself - the starship is home to six cargo pods (one for each resource). Each ship also contains six spaces for installing modules, with one of the six being preinstalled. The ship is also home to a hangar containing two smaller spaceships (a colony ship and a trade ship), as well as an array of cannons (one being preinstalled) and boosters (two preinstalled).

==== Cargo Pods ====
Each ship comes with six cargo pods - one for each resource. Each of the five main cargo holds are able to hold a maximum of two of a certain resource, which can be upgraded with the appropriate modules. The Science Lab is not affected by the modules, but it can only hold up to four science points. At the start of the game, each player begins with two trade goods and one science point.

==== Modules ====
The six remaining spaces on the starship are for modules. These expand the capabilities of the starship, and thus the player's own capabilities. At the start of the game, each player begins with one module of their choice, and the other five may be built over the course of the game. Each module can be further upgraded to a Level II Module, which further expands the capabilities of the starship. However, only one player may have a Level II module.

Name	Level I Effect	Level II Effect
Command	May take three actions per flight.	May take four actions per flight.
Logistics	May store up to three resources in cargo bays.	May store up to four resources in cargo bays.
Production	Produces trade goods on one die roll.	Produces trade goods on two dice rolls.
Science	Produces science points on one die roll.	Produces science points on two dice rolls.
Sensor	Look at the first two cards of the sector you're flying into. Choose to keep them or discard them.	Look at the first three cards of the sector you're flying into. Choose to keep them or discard them.
Trade	Buy a resource from the opponent for two Astro.	Buy up to two resources from the opponent for two Astro each.

==== Cannons and Boosters ====
Like Starfarers, cannons and boosters may be installed onto the ship, each with its own purpose. Up to three cannons and three boosters can be installed, which can be at one of two different levels. The cannon or booster levels aid in determining combat power and flight power, respectively, during the game's phases.

==== Hangar ====
Each ship also contains a hangar, which may contain up to two spaceships. There are two types of spaceships: colony ships and trade ships. At the start of the game, the player begins with one of each in their hangar.

== Playing the Game ==
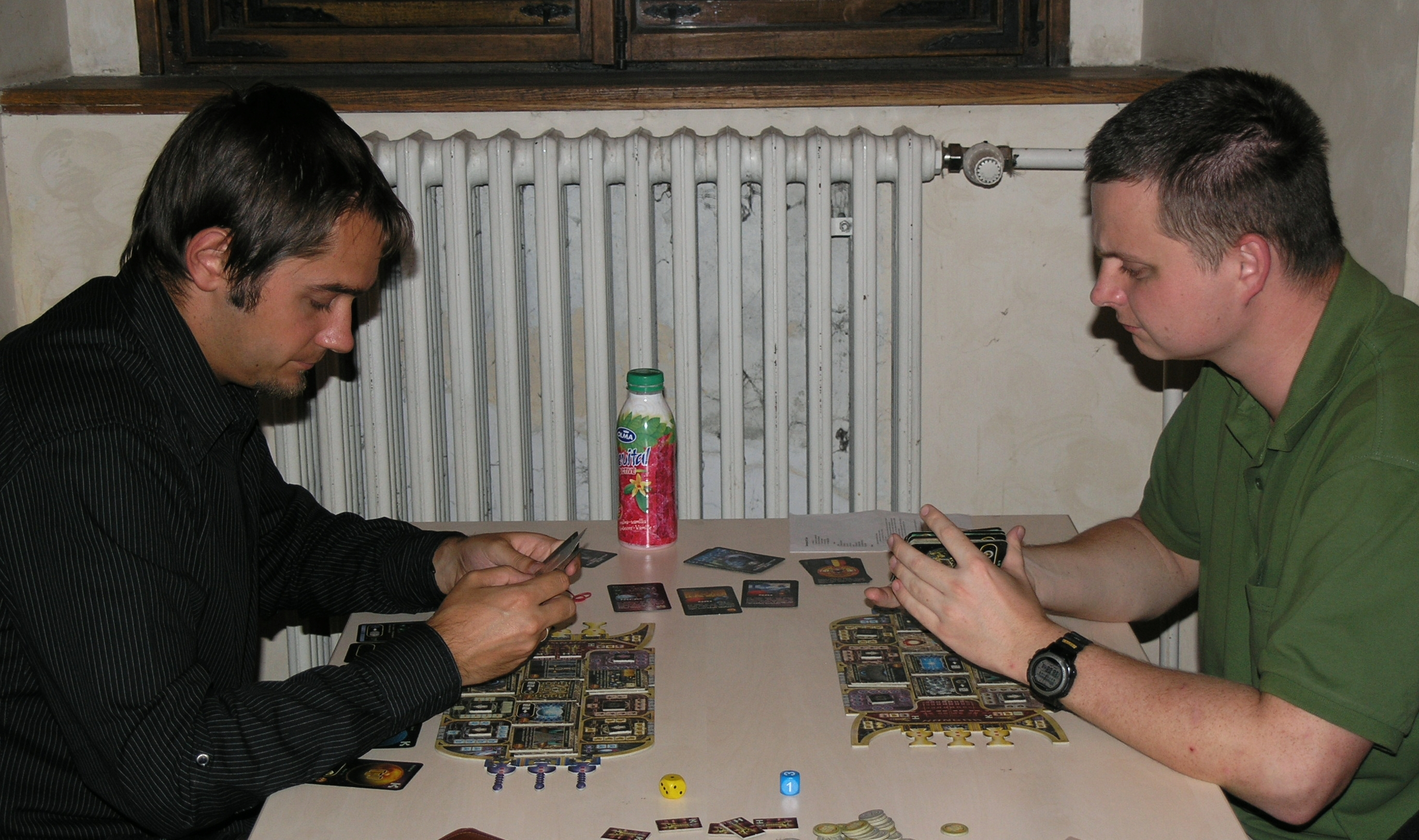
Playing Starship Catan

Like other Catan games, there are several main phases to the game - production, flight, trade, and building.

=== Production ===
At the start of each turn, the player to move rolls a single die, and, like Settlers or Starfarers, any colony planet with a production number matching the number shown on the die produces a single resource of the card's specified type. However, unlike the other games, only one colony planet may produce resources at a time, and a player is forced to choose when one of two or more colonies can produce resources. The resource being produced, however, is lost if there is insufficient cargo space.

Any roll matching the number shown on the production or science modules also produces trade goods or science points, and are subject to the same storage restrictions. However, a player can concurrently produce resources from a module as well as a colony.

=== Flight ===
The flight phase is considered the main phase of the game, and is unique to Starship Catan. During this phase, players may elect to explore (or fly to) any one of four different sectors, each being represented by ten cards. Once a sector is selected, the combined levels of the boosters on the starship is added to the roll from the production die to determine the maximum number of cards that may be explored.

When exploring the system, each card in the sector is flipped up one by one by the opponent, and the player may choose to take an action on a card. The flight ends if either the maximum number of cards are reached, the maximum number of actions are taken (initially two, can be upgraded with modules), or the player loses in a pirate attack. A player may also choose to end their flight phase prematurely. If a card is ever removed from the sector, it is replaced with a new card from a reserve pile.

There are a number of possibilities as to what may be explored:

==== Adventure Planets ====
Missions at a Glance
Name	Race	Planet	Level	Requirement	Reward
Environmental Pollution	Green Folk	Poseidon	1	1 science point	3 Astro, 1 resource
Famine	Green Folk	Picasso	2	1 Food	1 Fame Point, 1 resource (except Food)
Galactic Council Meeting	Diplomats	Poseidon	3	6 Astro	1 Fame Point, 2 resources
Gift from the Diplomats	Diplomats	Picasso	1	None	1 resource
Gift from the Merchants	Merchants	Pallas	1	None	1 resource
Monument	Merchants	Pallas	4	2 ore, 1 Carbon	1 Victory Point
Pirates	Scientists	Hades	2	3 cannons	3 Astro, 1 resource
Plague	Diplomats	Hades	3	2 science points	1 Victory Point
Rebuilding	Diplomats	Hades	4	10 Astro	2 Fame Points
S. O. S.	Green Folk	Picasso	3	4 boosters	1 Fame Point, 1 resource
Urgent Need I	Merchants	Pallas	2	1 Trade	1 Fame Point, 1 resource (except Trade)
Urgent Need II	Merchants	Poseidon	4	2 Trade	1 Fame Point, 2 resources (except Trade)

There are four Adventure Planets in the four sectors, named Pallas, Hades, Picasso, and Poseidon. These allow the player to undertake missions and receive rewards for their completion.

At any given time, there are three missions available. Whenever a mission is complete, it is replaced by a new mission from a reserve pile. Each mission states the planet that the player must encounter, as well as any other additional requirements. If the requirements are met (and if it consists of Astro or resources, paid as a cost), then the mission is completed. Missions may award Fame Points, Victory Points, or resources upon their completion.

If more than one mission is available on a planet, the player may choose to complete all available missions. However, a player may not complete any newly replaced missions.

The completion of each mission constitutes a single action.

==== Colony Planets ====
Colonies At a Glance
Resource	Production Roll		
Resource	1	2	3
Carbon	Alioth VIII	Dubhe IV	Benet-Nash IX
Food	Phekda VI	Mizar IX	Merak V
Fuel	Megrez III	Enif I	Alkor III
Ore	Bellatrix I	Heka II	Theta Pegasi II

These planets may be colonized by either player so long as a player has a colony ship in their hangar. If a planet is colonized, it is removed from the sector. Colonies allow a player to produce resources on a specific roll of the dice during the production phase. Colonies are also worth one Victory Point, and is the main way in which a player gains Victory Points. There are a total of twelve colony planets (three planets for ore, fuel, food, and Carbon), with each player beginning with one colony (Megrez III for the sun player and Alioth VIII for the moon player).

Four of the planets (Benet-Nash IX, Enif I, Mizor IX, and Theta Pegasi II) begin the game among the reserves.

Colonization of a planet constitutes an action.

==== Lost Planets ====
This represents an uninhabited planet, and no action is taken there.

==== Pirate Attacks ====
There are 11 pirate cards in the sectors, of which nine begin in reserves. If a pirate card is turned up, the opposing player does not immediately reveal the card, but instead tells the player that there is a pirate attack. Each pirate may demand some amount of Astro as a ransom. If the ransom is paid, the flight continues. However, if the player instead chooses to fight, the player rolls a blue combat die, and adds its value to the combined levels of the player's cannons to form its combat value, while the opponent rolls the blue die and adds its value to the value printed on the pirate card (which may be anywhere between 2 and 7) to determine the pirates' combat value.

If the pirates' strength is strictly greater, the flight immediately ends, and boosters, cannons, or modules may be lost as a result. If a booster or cannon is destroyed, a Level I booster is destroyed, or if all boosters are at Level II, one such booster is reduced to Level I. If a module is destroyed, the opponent may choose the module to be removed. If a Level II module is chosen, the Level I module remains.

If the player wins by having an equal or greater combat strength, however, the pirate is removed from the sector, and as a reward the player may select any single resource of their choice as well as a Fame Point.

Regardless of how a pirate attack is resolved, no action is taken.

==== Trade Planets ====
Trade Planets at a Glance
Resource	Exchange Rate				
Resource	1	2	3	4	5
Carbon	Corendium VII	Tostoku I	Beteigeuze VI	Marsitis VI	Quartzee X
Food	Planctoinis VII	Sputsallia IV	Saiph VI	Pobeckifiked VI	Califasperum V
Fuel	Litigus IX	Gonsarium II	Mintaka II	Brocollar II	Phlatiarum V
Ore	Ireoni VII	Cupperius IV	Rigel X	Leedsi X	Bazaltide IV
Trade	Martkwal VIII	Beowulf's Bane	Alnitak IX	Parapeckis VII	Martiin-Tempest II

There are 25 planets (five per resource) that buy and sell commodities for anywhere between one and five Astro. A player may also choose to build a trading post on any planet where three Astro are exchanged for the resource. If a trading post is established, the planet is removed from the sector, and the player building the trading post receives one Friendship Point. Trading posts can be established if a trade ship is in a player's hangar.

Each of the four alien races also maintains trade outposts - however they may only engage in specific types of one-way trade:

- The Diplomat outpost allows players to buy one resource for three Astro (although only one resource may be purchased). There are three Diplomat outposts, although only one allows trading posts to be built.
- The Scientist outpost allows players to buy science points for two Astro. There is one Scientist outpost, which allows trading posts to be built.
- The Green Folk outpost allows players to sell science points for four Astro each. There is one Green Folk outpost, which allows trading posts to be built.
- The Merchant outpost allows players to sell up to two resources for three Astro each. There is one Merchant outpost, which allows trading posts to be built.

All five outposts that allow trading posts begin the game in the reserves.

A final planet, Median, may have a trading post built on it. This planet does not give any trade benefits, but grants two Friendship Points instead of one when the trading post is built. Median begins the game in the reserves.

There is also the Galactic Library planet Kopernicus II, which does not allow trading posts, but allows science points to be bought and sold for three Astro each.

Trading with a trade planet or establishing a trading post constitutes one action.

=== Trading and Building ===
Building Costs at a Glance
Name	Carbon	Food	Fuel	Ore	Science	Trade
Level I Booster	-	-	2	-	-	-
Level II Booster	-	-	2	-	1	-
Level I Cannon	2	-	-	-	-	-
Level II Cannon	2	-	-	-	1	-
Colony Ship	-	1	1	1	-	-
Level I Module	1	1	-	1	-	-
Level II Module	1	2	-	1	-	-
Trade Ship	-	-	1	1	-	1

The Trading and Building phase allows players to improve their starships, trading with their established trading posts if necessary. A player may use up to two different trading posts, although they may use each post as many times as they wish (the exception is the Diplomat trading post, which can only be used once). Trading and building may be performed in any order, except that all trades through trading posts must be performed all at once.

A player may also use their trade modules to buy resources from their opponent - the opponent cannot refuse such a transaction. The two players may also trade resources, science points, and Astro on any agreeable terms.

== Winning ==
The objective is to have at least ten Victory Points on a given turn. A Victory Point is awarded for each colony and Level II module, as well as from certain missions (Monument and Plague). In addition, there are two special victory points that may be obtained, akin to the Largest Army and Longest Trade Route from Settlers:

- A player may be awarded the Friend of the People Victory Point if they have at least three Friendship Points and have strictly more than the opponent. This point is relinquished if the opponent moves into a tie for Friendship Points.
- A player may be similarly awarded the Hero of the People Victory Point for having at least three Fame Points and strictly more than the opponent, which must be similarly relinquished.

== Starship Catan Light ==
A simpler, one-player version of Starship Catan can be played online after registration (which is free) on Playcatan. In this version, the game lasts for 18 turns. Like the two-player version, the player starts with 25 Astro, but unlike it, the player only starts with one booster and no cannons. At the beginning of the first turn, a booster or cannon is chosen, for free. Before the second turn and every three turns after that (fifth, eighth, etc.), a booster or cannon may be bought for three Astro, or a command or logistics module for one Astro. Before the first, second, and seventeenth turns, the modules may not be chosen. The modules cannot be upgraded to level II. If a fourth booster or cannon is bought, two of them become level II boosters/cannons and the third disappears; it is impossible to buy more than five of either.

There is no production. A sector is chosen, and the die is rolled and added to the boosters. The cards are:

- Lost planets, which are the same as in the two player version.
- Trade planets, but only the planets that buy and sell for 1, 2, 3, and 4 Astro exist. There are also no planets that buy/sell trade goods; these are acquired in a different way. The only purpose of these planets is to gain Astro (by buying at a planet with a cheaper price and selling at a planet with a more expensive price), because resources are not used to build anything.
- Kopernicus II, which, like the two-player game, sells science points for 3 Astro. However, they cannot be sold back, and only one may be bought on each visit.
- The same four adventure planets (Pallas, Hades, Picasso, and Poseidon), which are much less complex. They give trade goods for science points, but it is only possible to do it once on each adventure planet.
- Pirates. These work similarly to the two-player game, with these minor changes:
  - There are only three pirates with two cannons, three with three cannons, and one with four cannons.
  - The player knows when he has encountered the pirate with four cannons, who is named "Theo the Terrible."
  - If the player is defeated, he does not necessarily end his turn; instead he loses two actions. This can be good if he has a command module and has not yet used any actions; but it can be bad if he only has one action left, in which case he starts with one less on the next turn. Also, no boosters, cannons, or modules are lost.
  - If the pirate is defeated, it is replaced by a lost planet. Pirates are the only cards ever removed, and lost planets are the only reserve cards. The player earns a medal, not a resource, except in the case of Theo the Terrible, whose defeat earns the player three medals.

After 18 turns, the game ends. There are no victory points; only fame points are used, calculated in a completely different way than in the two-player game. They are equivalent to victory points in other Settlers of Catan games. Each medal is worth 5 points, with a 20-point bonus for defeating all 7 pirates. Each trade good is worth 15 points, and each Astro is worth 1.

On Playcatan, after the player has "flown" through a stack, a list of cards in it that the player has seen is available, so if it is played with the regular Starship Catan cards, the player would be allowed to write this down. (Of course, like in the two-player version, the stack through which the player has flown is mixed after each turn).
