= Eurogames (game publisher) =

Board game publisher

- Predecessor: Jeux Rexton
- Founded: 1984
- Products: Board games

Eurogames is a publisher of board games, founded in 1984 as Jeux Rexton (Rexton Games) to publish the man-to-man miniature combat game, Cry Havoc and its expansions. In 1988 Duccio Vitale expanded the company to begin publishing more board games, starting with six games purchased from the bankrupt Italian gaming company, International Team. At this time the company became Eurogames.

Eurogames itself was later purchased by Jeux Descartes, and they remained an imprint of that company until Descartes's bankruptcy. Jeux Descartes's assets were then purchased by French publisher Asmodée Éditions, who appears to be slowly merging some of Eurogames and Descartes games into their own line.

In a brief interim period, Eurogames distribution rights were licensed to Cafe Games, who published the Mare Nostrum Mythology expansion in 2005 under a Eurogames/Cafe Games label.

Well-known games published by Eurogames:

- Condottiere
- Evo
- Formula Dé
- Mare Nostrum
- Serenissima
- Vinci
- Grass
- Croisades
- Mai '68 Le jeu
