= ReCharge Collectible Card Game =

Out-of-print collectible card game

ReCharge
- Publishers: Marvel Entertainment
- Years active: 2001–2002
- Genres: Collectible card game
- Players: 2
- Playing time: Approx 15 min
- Chance: Some
- Age range: 10+
- Skills: Card playing; Arithmetic; Basic Reading Ability

ReCharge Collectible Card Game is an out-of-print collectible card game (CCG) based on Marvel Superheroes and produced by Marvel Entertainment in 2001. The game is modeled after Wizards of the Coast's X-Men Trading Card Game. It was subsumed by UpperDeck's Vs. System, which is still the torch-bearer as the main Marvel CCG.

== Product releases ==
Two sets of ReCharge were released, called Series 1 (a.k.a. "Inaugural Edition") and Series 2. However, the cards between the sets are almost identical.

== Reviews ==
- Pyramid
