= Capitol (board game) =

2001 board game

Capitol is a German-style building game set in the ancient Roman Empire, designed by Aaron Weissblum and Alan R. Moon. The game was published by Schmidt Spiele in 2001. It was redeveloped into a quicker-playing card game named Clocktowers and published by Jolly Roger Games.

== Gameplay ==
Capitol is played in four rounds and each round is divided into four phases: construction, improvement, scoring, and end phase. During the construction phase the players are able to perform actions with their hand of building, roof, and permit cards.

- Building cards allow the player to take two floors (small wooden blocks). They can be added to an incomplete building or used to create a new building.
- Roof cards allow the player to complete a building by placing a round or triangular roof on their stack of floor blocks. Once the building is complete, it can be placed onto the board with a permit card.
- The permit card comes in three different types – pink, blue, and purple, each correlating to three sections of the board.

Once all the players have passed on playing cards, they then proceed to the improvement phase. This is a very fast bidding phase in which players can win fountains, amphitheaters, or temples.

Then comes the scoring phase; each of the nine areas are scored by determining the first and second players. The first player in each area receives two points. If the area has a fountain, the first and second players receive an additional point. If the area has a temple, all of the points received are doubled.

The final phase is the end phase. Each player draws six cards, one at a time, from the face up stacks of building, roof, and permit cards. If an area has an amphitheater, the first player may draw two extra cards and the second player may draw one extra.

The player with the most points at the end of four rounds wins the game.
