= Sketchy =

Sketchy may refer to:

- pertaining to one of the uses of Sketch (disambiguation)
- Sketchy (album), a 2021 album by Tune-Yards
- Sketchy Andy (Andy Lewis, born 1986), performer and extreme sports athlete
- Sketchy Bongo (Yuvir Pillay, born 1989), South African record producer and songwriter
- Sketchy, three EPs (1999, 2000, 2005) by Jonah Matranga or as Onelinedrawing
- "Sketchy", an episode of Haven (season 1)
