= Croisades =

Croisades is a 1987 board game published by Jeux Rexton.

== Gameplay ==
Croisades is a game in which a medieval wargame with both strategic army movement across Palestine also has a roleplaying mode where players develop characters, negotiate, battle, and rise through the ranks from peasant to knight.

== Reviews ==
- Casus Belli #39
- Casus Belli #40
- Jeux & Stratégie #46
