= Further Information =

Further Information is a 2000 role-playing game supplement for Continuum published by Aetherco/Dreamcatcher.

== Contents ==
Further Information is a supplement in which information for both historic and fictional time periods is presented for the gamemaster.

== Reception ==
Further Information was reviewed in the online second version of Pyramid which said "Some individuals are selected to become spanners, time travelers who strive to protect the timeline from the Narcissists. The Narcissists are an opposing breed of travelers who lack a spanner's cautious nature and who don't care that their oft-paradoxical actions may fragment history. Since the timestream is rife with spanners and Narcissists, there's a whole secret history that, until now, has been drawn with somewhat indistinct lines. Further Information throws things into sharp relief."

== Reviews ==
- Backstab #24
