= Continuum (role-playing game) =

Science fiction tabletop role-playing game about time travel

Roleplaying in the Yet
- Continuum cover; illustrated by Mike Kaluta.
- Designers: Chris Adams, Dave Fooden, Barbara Manui
- Illustrators: Mike Kaluta
- Publishers: Aetherco, Dreamcatcher
- Publication: 1999
- Years active: 1999 to present (limited publisher activity)
- Genres: Time travel
- Players: 2+
- Chance: Dice rolling
- Website: Official website

Continuum: Roleplaying in the Yet (stylized as C°ntinuum: roleplaying in The Yet) is a science fiction role-playing game about time travel created by Chris Adams, Dave Fooden and Barbara Manui and published by Aetherco/Dreamcatcher. The Continuum also refers to a collective group of time travelers as a whole and the society they inhabit in the game.

== Setting ==
Unlike other time travel games (and fiction), which usually depict time travelers as either lone explorers or as an all-powerful "time police", Continuum assumes that time travelers (spanners) would eventually evolve their own society, with its own laws, rules, slang, groups, art movements, and the like. Time travel would color such a civilization in the same way that any other major technology (such as television or the automobile) has changed the human race. Continuum states that the core question of the game is "If you could learn to span time at will . . . what form of civilization would you be entering?"

The Continuum, the main spanner civilization, extends through the whole of human history (and beyond, although the post-Human society of the enigmatic "Inheritors" borders on both sides). A primary focus of this civilization is to increase the knowledge and acceptance of time travel by the human race, so that when time travel is discovered and announced (approx. 2222 AD), humans will be ready for it, and moving into the next step in their evolution (becoming Inheritors). Another focus of the Continuum is the complete documentation of history.

The Continuum civilization also has "time criminals", called "Narcissists", so called because they seek to remake history in their own image. (In the late 1990s the publisher announced they would be releasing a version of the Continuum book with the background material retold from the Narcissist standpoint. Over two decades later, it has not been released, but a pre-release edition circulated in 1999 and 2000.) The Continuum has members trained to "repair" damage caused to the course of history by the Narcissists.

The game's solution to the issue of time travel paradox is the concept of frag. The universe does not tolerate paradox caused by time travelers, nor are parallel worlds created by paradox. Instead the universe begins to "erase" those for whom the paradox exists. (The frag concept appears to be based partly on the ideas in Alfred Bester's "The Men Who Murdered Mohammed".) Too much association with paradoxes (too much frag) and time travelers become something not quite real anymore. Frag can also be generated on purpose, a tactic in "time combat". The Continuum society is partially built upon the repair of paradoxes that affect its members.

To explain frag by example, using the Grandfather paradox, a Narcissist might decide to travel back in time and kill his grandfather. If he "succeeded", he would return to his own time to find his grandfather alive. (The Continuum would step in to "repair" the murder.) The Narcissist would then begin to fade out of existence due to the conflict between his own memories and "actual" history. He has been "fragged".

The game also has immersion techniques to bring players "into the game". Most of the book claims to be, and is written as, an anachronistic artifact of spanner culture, aimed at increasing public awareness of time travel to further the Continuum's ends, and to prepare for the public announcement of time-travel. For example, players are required to quote the Maxims of the Continuum before advancing to the next level, and track their time travel, in exactly the manner their characters in the game do. Artwork in the books is also credited to spanners and often depicts the particular aspects of spanner culture.

== Sourcebooks ==
- Manui, Barbara; Fooden, David; Adams, Chris; Holliday, Liz (1999-10-01). Continuum: Roleplaying in the Yet. Continuum. Jaffe, Sean (contributor); Ward, Brian (contributor). New York, NY: Aetherco and Dreamcatcher Multimedia. ISBN 1-929312-00-8. OCLC 44651230.
  - The main rulebook required for play.
- Manui, Barbara; Fooden, David; Ward, Brian; Patrick, Kyle; Sanchez, Juan (2000). Further Information: A Gamemaster's Treasury of Time. Continuum. Holliday, Liz (contributor); Adams, Chris (contributor). New York, N.Y.: Aetherco and Dreamcatcher Multimedia. ISBN 1-929312-01-6.
  - A resource book detailing various civilizations lost to "mainstream" history, but well known to spanners.
- A third book, titled Nªrcissist: Crash Free, was announced in the late 1990s. It has not yet been released, but the v0.5 and v0.7 playtest drafts of the work are available online. However, one of Continuum's writers has stated that the playtest is considerably different from the "current", as yet unpublished version of the rules.

== Reviews ==
- Pyramid
