= Gother Than Thou =

Gother Than Thou: The Most Pretentious Card Game Ever Made is a card game that parodies the goth subculture. It was first published in 2000 by Savant Garde Entertainment. Gother Than Thou appeared on the 2001 Games magazine Games 100 list, and was nominated for the "Best Graphic Presentation of a Card Game" category of the 2002 Origins Awards.

The game is played with a deck of 55 cards, which contain three types of Points, which are Goth Points, Sickness, and Money. Every player is dealt five cards. Each player, on their turn, discards one card from their Fate pile, then plays a card into each player's Fate pile, including their own, finally drawing enough cards to refill their hand.

For each Sickness point a player has, they can hold one less card in their hand. At five points of Sickness, a player Swoons, loses their entire Fate pile, and draws five cards. A player who is not In Debt can draw cards from the discard pile. The first player to twenty Goth points wins.

== Reviews ==
- Pyramid
