= Stratego: Legends =

Strategy board game

Stratego: Legends is a strategy board game created and released by Avalon Hill in 1999. Set in a mythical world called "The Shattered Lands", the game pits the forces of good (represented by beige-back pieces) against the forces of evil (represented by gray-back pieces). Gameplay and rules are similar to the original Stratego game, and also somewhat similar to chess. The game was discontinued by Avalon Hill in 2004.

== Backstory ==
The backstory of Legends is as follows: The Valorians and the Ancients had an alliance and used their powers for good. The Manes and the Gargans also had an alliance and used their powers for evil. The forces of good and the forces of evil waged constant war against each other for decades, until one day, a mythical group of creatures called the "Celestia" used their magical powers to form a barrier called The Divide. The Divide was positioned so that the lands held by the forces of good were isolated from the forces of evil. According to the official rule book, The Divide "could not be flown over, dug under, gone around, or forced through." With no way to reach the other, the Valorians and Ancients ceased the wars against the Gargans and Manes. The Celestia swore that if anyone brought down The Divide and restarted the wars, they would fight against the Celestia in the new wars. Neither army wanted to do so, after witnessing the creation of The Divide. After their vow, the Celestia vanished and were not seen again. Eventually, the Gargans and the Manes discovered a new race, the Qa'ans. The Qa'ans dwelled deep underground, where they had developed new kinds of magic. They promised the forces of evil that they would destroy The Divide and fight alongside their new allies if they received a piece of the land that would be conquered. The Gargans and Manes accepted, and the Qa'ans ended The Divide. When it was determined that The Divide was down, the leaders of the Valorians and the Ancients prepared for war. However, true to their word, the Celestia returned. The Qa'ans had brought down The Divide, so the Celestia allied against the Qa'ans, and extended an alliance to the forces of good. Both good and evil had new, stronger allies. With no Divide, the wars began again. The battles that followed are played out in the game Stratego: Legends.

== Gameplay ==
The goal is to destroy the opponent's castle, similar to capturing a flag in the original game. The game is won when an opponent is unable to move any pieces. The gameplay mechanics of Legends closely resemble those of the original Stratego. Players take turns performing actions until one player emerges victorious.

If a piece moves into a space occupied by another piece, a battle occurs, with the piece with the higher number emerging as the victor. In the event of a tie, both pieces are removed from play.

In Legends, there are also Magic pieces, which act as the equivalent of Bombs in the original game. When a piece attacks a Magic piece, the magic piece is destroyed, and its corresponding magic ability is activated.

Like in Stratego editions published since 2000, Legends assigns greater strength to the higher numbers. An assembled army for Legends is as follows:

- One piece with a base strength of 10
- One piece with a base strength of 9
- Three 8s
- Three 7s
- Three 6s
- Three 5s
- Three 4s
- Three 3s
- Three 2s
- One 1 (like the Spy from Stratego, 1s destroy only 10s and sometimes 9s)
- Five Magic pieces
- One Castle

=== Changes from the original game ===
- In the original Stratego, a piece moves whether or not it attacked. In Legends, only the attacker moves, and only if it attacks successfully.
- In Legends, there are many kinds of terrain, which may affect the strength of a piece. The original game has no such variants.
- In the original game, only the Spy, the Scouts, and the Miners have special powers. In Legends, all pieces have some kind of special power.
- Stratego allows players to set up their army any way they want. In Legends, an army could become nearly invincible if a player were allowed to set up as they wanted (because all pieces have special powers). For this reason, the pieces are "shuffled", and set up randomly, as are the terrain spaces.

== Armies ==
There are six armies in Legends, divided into two teams. When playing the game, one player chooses the forces of good, the other chooses the forces of evil.

=== Forces of Good ===
The Forces of Good are placed on beige back-sided pieces. In the rule book, they are also referred to as Landor's Legions.

Valorians

The Valorians are gold front-side pieces and original members of the forces of good. They are represented by mostly Paladins, Clerics, and Wizards of the Grand Temple. They are known for being chivalrous, and for singing songs and telling tales, but they are also ferocious warriors. It would appear, from the rule book, that Sir Urgwaine, a powerful Paladin, is their leader.

Ancients

The Ancients, green front side pieces, are original members of the forces of good and are The Shattered Lands' first inhabitants. They are largely represented by Elves and Dwarves and supplemented by Rangers and other natural forces. Strongly linked to the earth, the Ancient's magic is connected to the forces of nature, "and their attacks often come from nowhere and everywhere." Landor the Ranger is their leader, from what is shown in the rule book's back story.

Celestia

The blue front-side pieces, the masters of the air, are the Celestia. They joined the forces of good when the Qa'ans took down The Divide. The Celestia are composed mostly of Angels and Spirits, and supplemented with mythical creatures. In the later expansion, Celestia Vengeance, Angels gained further representation, as did Dragons, and oddly enough, Wizards. From the rule book back story in the original game, and in the expansion pack, it looks like Elementus the Airlord, the most powerful Spirit, is the leader of the Celestia.

=== Forces of Evil ===
The gray-back-side pieces, known as Kralc's Hoard, represent the Forces of Evil bent on the destruction of The Shattered Lands.

Gargans

The Gargans are a race of mountain-dwelling creatures. They are represented by a silver front side, and their armies contain mostly Giants and Titans, with Ogres and Beasts adding supplement. Gargan shamans control unusual magic associated with far-off lands, and the melee warriors fight with "swords, fangs, and whips". There is some evidence suggesting that the strongest Titan, Ultimadus, is Gargan's leader. However, the rule book back story refers to the forces of evil as Kralc's Hoard. This would imply that the Dragon Kralc is the actual leader of the Gargans, which is unusual because, in the back story, he seems to take orders from Ultimadus. The Gargans were half of the original forces of evil.

Manes

An undead race that feeds on war and destruction, the Manes are composed of Vampires, Skeletons, and Zombies, with a few other kinds of pieces as supplements. They were part of the original forces of evil. The word "Mane" comes from the Roman word, which referred to the souls of the dead. Many Manes receive terrain bonuses from marshes. Their magic involves resurrecting their kind, and destruction of others. According to the rule book, the Manes are "led by a race of dragonoids". By this logic, one can infer that Oppolifnas is their leader. Red is the front side color of the Manes.

Qa'ans

The last of the forces of evil, the Qa'ans joined the Gargans and the Manes when they promised to take down The Divide, in exchange for some conquered land. Arguably the most confusing and original creations of the game, the purple-front-side Qa'ans are made up of giant Insectoid-like beasts, and living Molds. They are also heavily supplemented by monstrous Worms and Mutant beings. Most of the magic of the Qa'ans, and many of their special abilities, revolves around exploiting the weaknesses of the enemy and even taking control of it. The rule book back story, and the back story of the expansion pack Qa'ans Resurgence, support that the Insectoid, Queen Kiova is the leader of the Qa'ans.

== Powers of the pieces ==
Unlike the original game of Stratego, every piece has a special power that can be used under certain conditions. There are four types of powers a piece can have: Innate powers, Abilities, Actions, and Death Curses.

Innate

Innate powers must be used when proper conditions are met. The player controlling them has no choice when an Innate is activated, and the opposing player must also comply.

Action

Action powers are special kinds of movement (or effects) that are used instead of a standard turn. Many players construct armies with Action-oriented pieces because as with real warfare, a mobile and flexible army will often perform better than an army that cannot move quickly. A piece must be revealed before an Action can be used.

Ability

Abilities are powers that may be used by the player. They do not always have to be used during a player's turn. Some Abilities require the revealed piece to be destroyed to activate it, while others only require it to be revealed. Abilities can be used to increase the strength of friendly pieces or decrease the strength of enemies. They may allow destroyed pieces to become revived, or allow the player to capture enemy pieces. Some even allow a player to gain an extra turn.

Death Curse

Death Curses are unique in the fact that the piece does not get to use this power until it has been destroyed. If a piece with a Death Curse is destroyed, it is set aside in a designated "Death Curse Zone". Once in the Death Curse Zone, the piece's Death Curse comes into effect. Some make pieces stronger or weaker, and some allow new kinds of movements or abilities. The Death Curse remains in effect until another piece with a Death Curse is destroyed. Then, the new Death Curse takes over. Some Death Curses are only usable after another Death Curse takes over. These pieces will say, "When this Death Curse ends...", in which case, it only works after it is replaced.

- Important note: A piece can never have its base strength reduced to zero. If a Death Curse would make a piece have a current strength of zero, it is automatically destroyed.

== Online play ==
Like many fantasy-themed collector games, Legends developed a following over the Internet. One of the more prominent websites was Thunder Point. This site provided free membership and access to an unlimited number of pieces. The site encouraged users to trade actual pieces through the mail and also allowed for online battles.

In addition, the site created pieces for use online. They were not created by Avalon Hill, and could not be used in reality. The first online expansion, Dalbac's Alchemists, was an expansion for the Valorians. It contained Alchemists and the Materials they used to create elixirs. This set introduced a new type of Power for a piece, called "Effect". A piece with Effect could be placed in the Death Curse zone, but not in the traditional fashion. It required several pieces working together. This expansion was designed to help combat the Lightning-type spells used by many Gargan armies, as well as give the Forces of Good some aid on Plain's battlefields.

The second expansion set, Artolis Betrayal, was an expansion for the Gargans. This set was created primarily to help counter Town and Wizard armies, which were (and still are) some of the most powerful beige-colored armies. There are many other pieces designed to help balance the game in this set, such as the magic piece Hurricane (which defeats Distance Strikers), Dragonslayer (which counters Dragons), and Gorgimera (which improves the otherwise obsolete Living Statue magic piece). This set gave more representation to Beasts, Ogres, and Minotaurs, which were introduced in the original sets, but were not common, and seldom used.

There was a third expansion set that was created, called Heihaki's Sprites. However, because the website began to lose membership, it was never released. The new set was to be for the Ancients and was designed to help counter the Skeleton armies, which were vastly powerful and very popular amongst Gray armies.

After Heihaki's Sprites, work was scheduled to begin on an expansion set for the Manes. However, with membership dwindling, the project was abandoned. The expansion was intended to give representation to Werewolves and add to the underused Vampires. There was also a rough outline given for the Gladiators, which was meant to be a Gold Expansion. Like the ones before it, it was never finished.

As of 2007, the site had not had an update since June 2004.
