= Mai '68 Le jeu =

1980 board game

Mai '68 Le jeu is a 1980 board game published by La Folie Douce.

== Gameplay ==
Mai '68 Le jeu is a game in which a humorous board game recreates the May 1968 Paris clashes, where students seek to reveal "the beach under the concrete" while police strive to maintain order.

== Reviews ==
- Casus Belli #45
- Casus Belli #46
- Jeux & Stratégie #6
- Jeux & Stratégie #51
