= Myths and Legends =

Collectible card strategy game

- Designers: Ricardo Errecalde, Antonio Matta, Mauricio Cerecera, Conrado Aciares (former)
- Publishers: SALO, Comic Images, Geniohi
- Players: unlimited now
- Setup time: approx 1 min
- Playing time: Approx 30 min
- Chance: Some
- Age range: 8+
- Skills: Card playing Arithmetic; Basic Reading Ability

Myths and Legends (Spanish: Mitos y Leyendas) is a collectible card game based on universal mythologies, developed in 2000 in Santiago, Chile. The game currently has 39 sets and over 3000 different cards. It is the only collectible card game fully produced and developed in Latin-America, with some expansions translated into the English and German languages. The game was released in Europe, United States, Oceania and Latin America. In January 2010, the game went into "indefinite recess" due to the bankruptcy of the publisher, Salo. In October 2014 the game was officially brought back to print with the release of Furia, a 190-card expansion that saw the return of many of the original artists to the game.

== Types of cards ==
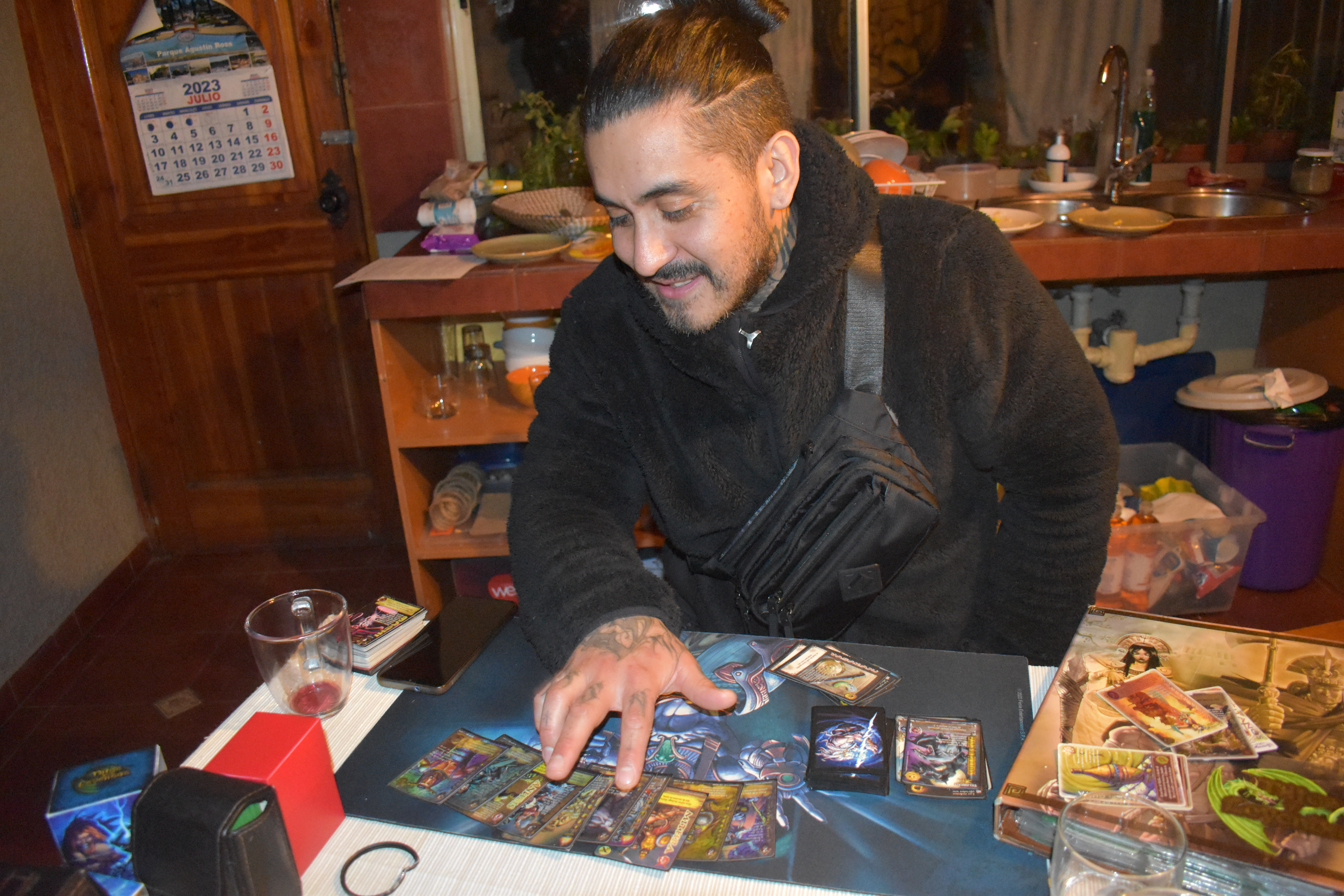
A player of Asociación Juglares from Pichilemu, using a deck formed with "First era" (Primera Era) cards.

A Myths and Legends deck is made up of five types of cards: Allies, Totems, Talismans, Weapons and Gold cards (Kingdom cards being used only during the Genesis Era). Each card has its own special function with some common characteristics. Each card's Gold cost is indicated in the upper right-hand corner. Cards without a number are usually Gold cards. The upper left-hand corner indicates the card type, with Totems, Weapons, and Talismans all having individual symbol, and Allies having a Strength number.

Totems are cards that grant specific abilities. The card's abilities can usually be activated as long as the Totem remains in play. Totems are played in the player's Support Line area.

Allies are warrior cards used to defend your Castle Deck or to attack your opponent's Castle. Note that these are the only cards that may be assigned in the Mythological Battle Phase. An Ally cannot attack unless it has been in play and under your control from the beginning of the turn. However, you can always use it to either block or activate its abilities.

Talismans are one-time use cards with specific effects. To play a Talisman, a player must first pay its Gold cost, show the card to their opponent, resolve the effect of the card and finally send it to the Ruin Pile.

Gold Cards are the resource used by players to play cards. Every time a player plays a non-Gold card, they move a number of Gold cards equal to the non-Gold card's cost from the Reserve area to the Used Gold area. This action is called payment in Gold. Players begin the game with one Gold Card in play, and can add a gold card to their Gold Reserve each turn.

Weapons are "attached to" (slid underneath) Allies already in play. Only one Weapon may be attached to an Ally at any time, and once attached to an Ally, a Weapon cannot be removed or transferred to another Ally.

Kingdom cards are featured in Genesis Era sets; these cards are chosen before the beginning of the duel, and only one Kingdom card can be played in a deck. Kingdom cards have effects that can be activated at any time, but only once per duel, and their effect cannot be prevented.

== Starting the game ==
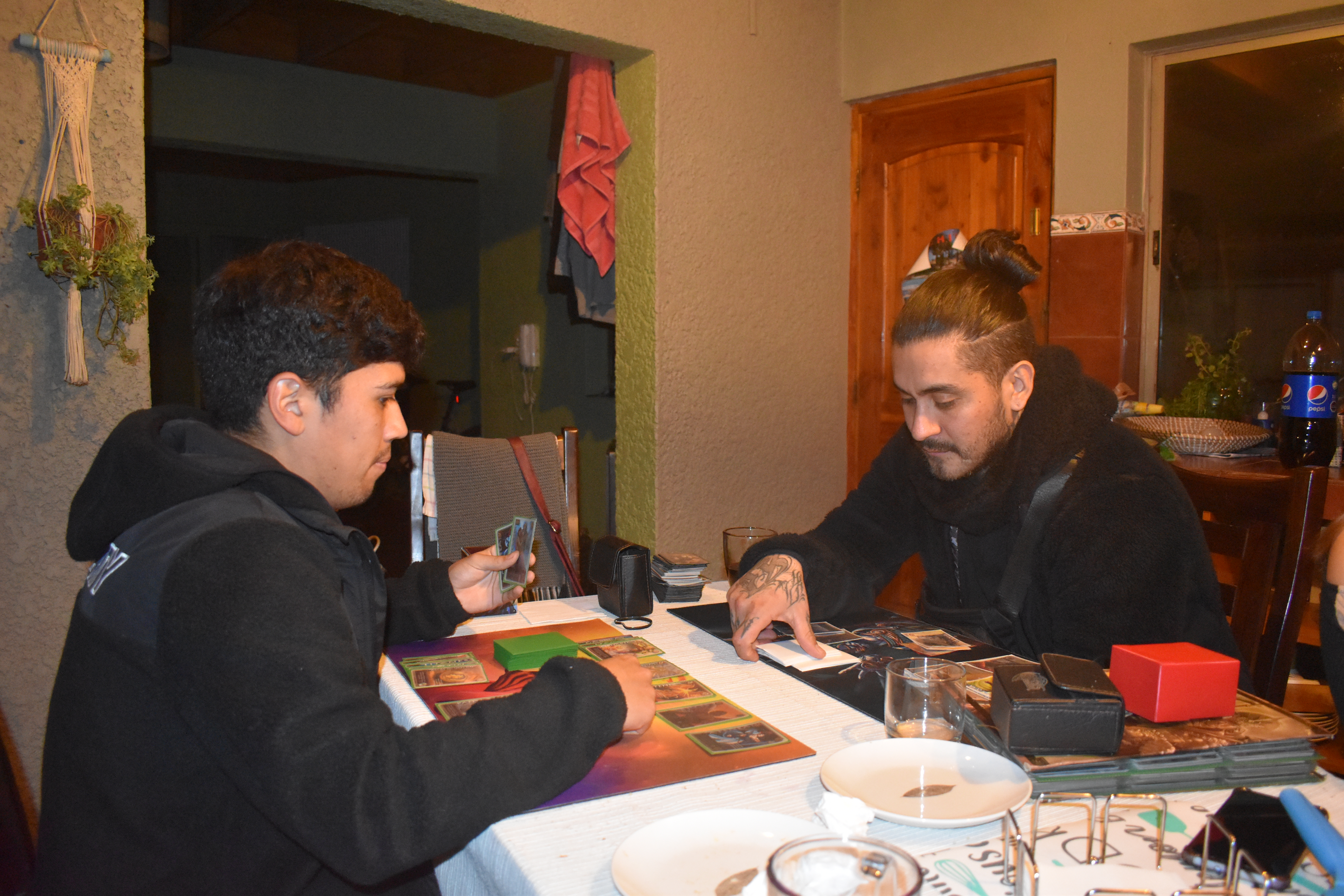
A match between two players from Asociación Juglares (Pichilemu), using "First Block, Second Era" decks.

Before beginning the game, both players search their Castle Deck for one Gold card and place it into their Gold Reserve areas. A player may only choose a Normal Gold card at the beginning of the game. Then the players shuffle their decks and pass the deck to an opponent to cut. The starting player is chosen randomly.

== The hand ==
Each player draws eight cards from the top of their Castle Deck to get their starting hand. Beginning with the first player, if a player does not want his or her starting hand, they can perform a mulligan as many times as they want, every time drawing one less card.

== Winning the game ==
A player wins a round when the other player draws or ruins the last card of their Castle Deck. In a full game of Myths and Legends, the first player to win two rounds becomes the winner of the game.

== Special abilities ==
As in other card games, Myths and Legends uses keywords or mechanics in order to simplify many effects of the card. Many of these effects have been continually used through the game, while other have been discarded due to overuse or because of balance issues.

- Única (Unique) - Only one copy of a Única card is allowed per deck.
- Orbe (Orb) - Orbe cards work with the following effects: it is considered a Única card and can only by affected by card that specifically target Orbe cards.
- Mercenario (Mercenary) - You are allowed to have more than 3 copies of a Mercenario card per deck.
- Relámpago (Lightning) - A Relámpago card can be played at the beginning of any phase or step of the turn.
- Maquinaria (Machinery) - An ability exclusive to Arma cards. A Maquinaria card is played in the Support Line and can only activate its effects as long his/her controller has one ally in play.
- Tamaño X (Size X) - A sub ability for Maquinaria cards. In order to use the Maquinaria effects, a player must control X or more allies.
- Embarcación (Craft) - An ability exclusive to Arma cards. Similar to Maquinaria cards, Embarcación cards are played in the Support Line, except that this card doesn't need an ally in play in order to use their effects.
- Errante (Wandering) - A player can only control one copy of an Errante card one at a time. If by any reason a player controls 2 or more copies of an Errante card, he must remove them from play.
- Réplica X (Replica X) - An ability exclusive to Talismán cards. When a Talisman card with Réplica is played, his/her owner can pay the Réplica cost. If done, the effects of the Talismán are used twice. Usually the Réplica cost is paid in gold, although many card offer alternatives like discarting card, destroying allies, and so on. Other Réplica cards, rather than copying the effect of the card, offer a second effect that can only be used by the payment of the Réplica cost.
- Furia (Fury) - An ability exclusive to Aliado cards. An ally with Furia can attack the same turn that was summoned.
- Imbloqueable (Unblockable) - Exclusive to Aliado cards. Can not be blocked by other allies.
- Indestructible (Indestructible) - Can not be destroyed by damage nor by effects (It still can be Vanished or returned to the hand or deck).
- Indesterrable (Indesterrable) - Cannot be vanished from the game (it still can be destroyed by damage or by effects; or returned to the hand or deck).
- Lealtad (Loyalty) - A card with Lealtad can not be controlled by the opponent, if by any reason a card with Lealtad is controlled by the opponent, the card is moved immediately to his/her owner.
- Inmunidad X (Immunity X) - A card with Inmunidad can not be the target of effects that comes from X (Where X is any specific type of card or race). Example: Inmunidad: Talismanes- can not be affected by the effects of any Talisman card; Inmunidad:Dragones- can not be the target of dragon type allies, although it can be affected by other type of allies.
- Guardián (Guardian) - Exclusive to Aliado cards. An Aliado with Guardián can not be sent out to attack.
- Embestida X (assault X) - Exclusive to Aliado cards. When an Aliado with Embestida X is blocked, the opponent receives X damage, regardless of the difference in strength of the attacking or blocking allies. This ability was discontinued after several players complained for an abuse of this ability. The ability was later redefined to be as follows: any damage that an ally makes to a deck is doubled.
- Oro Inicial (Initial Gold) - Exclusive to Oro cards. The owner is allowed to start the game with this card, even if the card has an effect.
- Exhumar (Exhume) - Any card with Exhumar can be played from the graveyard as it where in your hand. However, if the card played was a Talisman, the card is Vanished.
- Retorno (Return) - Any card with Retorno can be played from the Exile zone. If the card played was a Talisman, vanish the card.
- Barrera (Barrier) - If a card with Barrera is dropped from your deck because of damage, you can vanish the Barrera card and stop any further deck drop.
- Evasión X (Evasion X) - Exclusive to Aliados. Each time an Evasión card blocks, his/her owner recovers X cards from the graveyard to the deck. This ability was discontinued as tended to prolong the game, causing troubles in official tournaments, where the limit time per game is one hour.
- Traición X (Betrayal X) - During the main phase, any player could pay the Traición cost of a card in order to gain its control. Usually the Traición cost was paid with gold; however, other cards accepted other types of payments, live dropping cards, discarding, and so on.
- Absorción (Absorption) - Any damage targeted to the deck, but intercepted by an Absorción Ally, is reduced to zero.
- Retador (Challenger) - Each time a Retador card attacks, its controller may select the opponent ally who must block it.
- Temerario (Bold) - Allies with Temerario can only be blocked by another Temerario ally.
- Inmortal (Immortal) - While not properly an ability, Inmortal worked as a "title" that allowed to interact with other cards that specified Inmortal card.

== Sets ==
The game is divided into sets, and each set showcases a different type of mythology. The sets are as follows:

- El Reto (The Challenge) - Universal mythology.
- Mundo Gótico (Gothic World) - Folklore centered around vampires, werewolves and monster hunters.
- La Ira del Nahual (The Nahual's Fury) - Myths and historical characters from pre-columbian Latin America.
- Ragnarok - Nordic mythology.
- La Cofradía (Brotherhood) - A recompilation of the El Reto, Mundo Gótico and La Ira del Nahual sets, featuring new artwork and reworks for some cards.
- Espíritu de Dragón (Dragon Spirit) - Chinese and Japanese mythology.

From here begins the segunda era (second age). Cards from previous editions cannot be added to segunda era decks.

- Espada Sagrada (Sacred Sword) - English medieval mythology, specially the Arthurian cycle.
- Cruzadas (Crusades) - Extension of Espada Sagrada. Centered around the eponymous Crusades.
- Helénica (Hellenic) - Greek mythology.
- Imperio (Empire) - Extension of Helenica, Roman mythology.
- Hijos de Daana (Daana's Children) - Celtic mythology.
- Tierras Altas (Highlands) - Extension of Hijos de Daana.
- Dominios de Ra (Ra's Domains) - Egyptian mythology.
- Encrucijada (Crossroads) - Extension of Dominios de Ra, the Persian and Ptolemaic rule.
- Guerrero Jaguar (Jaguar Warrior) - Pre-columbian mesoamerican myths and history, mainly Aztec and Mayan mythology.
- Vendaval (Gale) - Extension of Guerrero Jaguar, South American pre-columbian mythology.
- Compendium - A recompilation of cards from Espada Sagrada to Tierras Altas.
- Barbarie (Barbarism) - Early medieval mythology and history, from the fall of the Roman Empire to Charlemagne's reign.
- Reino de Acero (Kingdom of Steel) - Medieval mythology and history, with an emphasis on the Hundred Years' War, and the story of El Cid Campeador.
- Hordas (Hordes) - Mongolian invasion to Europe.
- Bestiario (Bestiary) - Evil beings from universal mythology. The set's background is an original story about Mephistopheles gathering an army of dark creatures, featuring several characters from previous editions of both First and Second Era reworked with new abilities.
- Extensión Compendium II Era - Extension of Compendium, includes cards from Espada Sagrada to Vendaval.
- Heroes - Extension of Bestiario, presents heroes and forces of good from universal mythology opposing Mephistopheles' "Dark Rebellion" featured in Bestiario.
- Código Samurái (Samurai Code) - feudal Japan culture and mythology.
- Katana - Extension of Código Samurái.
- Héroes, la gloria tiene su precio (Heroes, glory has a price) - Chilean Independence, the War of the Pacific, and the Civil War of 1891.
- Piratas (Pirates) - The story of the pirates through the seven seas.
- Corsarios (Corsairs) - Extension of Piratas, it's about the history of buccaneers.
- Inmortales(Immortals) - Re-illustrated characters from Espada Sagrada to Vendaval.
- Dunas (Dune) - Arabian mythology, including the tales of Scheherazade and the One Thousand and One Nights
- Origenes (Origins) - Chilean pre-columbian mythology.
- Invasión (Invasion) - Greek and Persian mythology and history during the Greco-Persian Wars.
- Insurgentes - Characters and events of the Mexican Revolution.
- Profecias (Prophecies) - Characters and events from the Old Testament.
- Éxodo (Exodus) - The story of the Book of Exodus.
- Vikingos (Vikings) - Myths from the land of Asgard.

From here begins MyL Genesis. New rules were added to the game. As it happened with segunda era, cards from the early sets are not compatible with these sets.

- Conquista (Conquest) - The arrival of the Spaniards to the new world.
- Trincheras (Trenches) - First World War with a modern look.
- Apocalipsis (Apocalypse) - An artistic interpretation of the biblical Apocalypse, featuring the final battle between the forces of Heaven and the forces of Hell.
- Condenados (Damned) - (battles of the vampires and werewolves) - cancelled

After a 4-year hiatus, the game was reedited with new content. Many segunda era block mechanics were brought back, ignoring the multi-color aspect of "Genesis". No cards from previous sets are compatible.

- Furia (Fury) - Greek, Egyptian, Norse and Medieval mythology. The last one with little to no coverage - First set in 4 years of hiatus.
- Furia: Extensión (Fury:Expansion) - Continues with the previous set, this time with more coverage of Egyptian mythology.
- Sumeria (Sumer) - Sumerian culture and mythology.
- Sumeria: Rebelión (Sumer: Rebellion)" - Further expands on Sumerian culture. Additionally makes a brief mention of the Persian invasion.
- Asgard - Nordic Mythology, focused on the Aesir and the reign of Odin.
- Midgard - Conclusion of the Nordic chapter. It reintroduces the Dragon creature type.
- Camelot (Camelot) - Medieval mythology focused around the Arthurian tale. Starting with this set, cards started being printed in Belgium notably increasing the cardboard quality. Any card previously was printed in Chile.
- Templarios (Templars) - Concludes the Arthurian tale, this time giving more focus to secondary characters.
- Bushido - Japanese mythology, revolving around the Samurai
- Sol Naciente (Rising Sun) - Direct expansion of Bushido. This is formally the last expansion to a set. Forward new sets would be auto-conclusive.
- Dominio (Dominion) - Mythology and history of the Late Middle Ages and the Renaissance.
- ContraAtaque (Counter Attack) - Reprint set from Furia to Midgard.
- Águila Imperial (Imperial Eagle) - Focusing on Roman history and myths.
- Steampunk - Complete collection in a single product. This set is the first whose main focus revolves around fictional characters, particularly from literary works of the XVIII and XIX centuries.
- Axis Mundi - Global mythology.
- Hijos del Sol (Children of the Sun) - Mesoamerican mythology and historical figures.
- Legado Gótico (Gothic Legacy) - General European mythology. A legacy set from the original Mundo Gótico.
- Kemeth - Egyptian mythology and historical figures.
- Dharma - Hinduism mythology and historical figures.
- Olimpia - Greek mythology and historical figures.
- Calavera (Skull) - Sea myths and historical figures from The Golden Age of Piracy.
- Kilimanjaro - Myths and historical figures from African cultures.
- Invasion Oscura (Dark Invasion) - Early Middle Ages mythology and historical figures.
- Dinastía del Dragón (Dragon's Dinasty) - Chinese mythology.
- Keltoi - Celtic mythology.
- Tierra Austral (Southern Land) - Mythology of the pre-Columbian peoples of Chile.
- Ángeles & Demonios (Angels and Demons) - Judeo-Christian Angelology and Demonology, including the works of Dante Alighieri, John Milton and William Blake.
- Escuelas Elementales (Elemental Schools) - Compilation of the editions from Dominio to Legado Gótico.
- Acero (Steel) - The Hundred Years' War.
- Cid, Sangre y Traición (Cid, Blood and Treason) - The spanish Reconquista.
- Despertar Gótico (Gothic Awakening) - Vampires, Werewolves, Witches and other dark folklore characters (similar to the previous "Gothic" editions: Mundo Gótico and Legado Gótico), along with occultism.
- Explorandum - Sailors and explorers.
- Roma (Rome) - Roman history and mythology, focused on the transition between the Roman Republic and Empire.
- Valhalla - Norse mythology.
- Excalibur - Arthurian mythology.
- La Venganza de Horus (Horus' Revenge) - Egyptian mythology.
- Troya (Troy) - Greek mythology.
- Napoleón, Fuego de la Revolución (Napoleon, Fire of the Revolution) - The French Revolution, the rise of Napoleon, and esotericism of the period.
- Guerreros del Sol (Warriors of the Sun) - Pre-Hispanic myths and legends.
- Espíritu Samurái (Samurai Spirit) - Medieval Japan.
- Guardianes de Daana (Guardians of Daana) - Celtic mythology.
- Bestiarium - An homage to the Bestiario set and its expansion, Héroes. A clash between the forces of Light and Darkness, with the King in Yellow as the instigator of the conflict.
- Onyria - Characters and events from classical literature of the 19th and early 20th centuries. Including the works of Lewis Carroll, Bram Stoker, Jules Verne, H. P. Lovecraft, among others.
- Libertadores (Liberators) - Chilean War of Independence.
- Kaiju vs Mecha: Titanes (Kaiju vs Mecha: Titans) - Original science fiction story based on Japanese tokusatsu, with characters inspired by kaiju and mecha franchises.
- Ángeles y Demonios: Vigilantes (Angels and Demons: Watchers) - Angelology and Demonology, similar to the original Ángeles y Demonios set.
