= Fvlminata: Armed with Lightning =

Fvlminata: Armed with Lightning is a 2001 role-playing game published by Thyrsus Games.

== Gameplay ==
Fvlminata: Armed with Lightning is a game in which a historical fantasy game is set in an alternate Rome empowered by explosive black powder, blending meticulous research, unique mechanics, and optional magic to let players explore politics, warfare, and intrigue in a world where the Empire thrives unchallenged.

== Reviews ==
- Pyramid
- Backstab #34
- Revisiting the Three Kingdoms (Issue 4 - Fall 2002)
