= Formula D (board game) =

Board game

Formula D / Formula Dé
- Circuit 1 – Circuit de Monaco
- Designers: Eric Randall; Laurent Lavaur
- Publishers: Ludodélire (1st ed.); EuroGames (2nd ed.); Asmodée (3rd Ed.)
- Years active: 1991—
- Players: 2–10
- Setup time: 5 minutes
- Playing time: 60+ minutes
- Chance: Some
- Age range: 8+
- Skills: Strategic thinking Resource management
- Website: Official Website

Formula D (originally published and still also known as Formula Dé) is a board game that recreates formula racing (F1, CART, IRL). It was designed by Eric Randall and Laurent Lavaur and was originally published by Ludodélire. The rights to the game passed to EuroGames (owned by Descartes Editeur) with the collapse of Ludodélire, and were in turn acquired by Asmodée Éditions. When Asmodée released their new edition, the game's name was shortened to Formula D and its rules updated to include street and import racing.

== Object of the Game ==
The game is about automobile racing, formerly with an emphasis on Formula 1. The object of the game is to cross the finish line first and win the race. Races can be anywhere from one to three laps long. Formula D comes with a game board measuring 100 × 70 cm (39 × 28 inches), seven specialized dice, twenty plastic race cars, and ten "dashboard" indicators that track the cars current gear and condition throughout the one, two, or three lap races.

The game has seven dice. There are six colored dice (d4, d6, d8, d12, d20, and d30) that are used to simulate specific gears, and a black d20 used for collisions, and other course events.

Each of the dice represents a gear shift. The d4 is used for 1st gear, the d6 for 2nd gear and so on. Each die has a series of numbers representing the number of spaces the F1 cars move.

The black die is a d20 and is not used to simulate gears, but is instead used for determining collisions, engine wear during fifth and sixth gears, pit stop speed, pole position, and whether or not at the beginning of the first lap you stalled, or had a flying start. If you are playing with the advanced rules, you can set up weather conditions with the black die.

== Gameplay ==
Each player takes a "dashboard" for their car which tracks damage to different parts of their car's systems. If any system is damaged too far, their car is eliminated from the race and they are out of the game. In the Rules for Beginners included alongside Rules for Advanced Players in the Asmodée edition, the wear points are simplified to a single pool of 18, to go with simplified race rules. The Advanced Asmodée rules are almost identical to the rules from previous editions with some minor fixes implemented.

On any given player's turn, they are required to choose which gear they want their car to be in. The chosen gear may be only one higher than the previous turn's gear, or may be one lower with no penalty; the player may also select a gear two, three, or four lower but this "gear crashing" causes damage to several car systems depending on how many gears were skipped. Having selected a gear, the player must roll the appropriate die for that gear. The coloured dice vary not only in number of sides but also in the range of numbers represented (they are not traditionally numbered dice). The player must then move their car a number of spaces equal to the roll.

However, the squares making up each corner on the racetrack are coloured differently from other squares, marked with a flag indicating a number. If the number is 1, the player must arrange to end their turn inside the coloured area. If the number is 2, the player must end 2 turns inside the coloured area, and so on. If a player fails to end the required number of turns inside the coloured area, they suffer a penalty, which may range from damage to the car's tires and/or brakes to immediate elimination of the car in the case where more than one turn ending was skipped.

Since the player is obliged to move the full distance rolled on the dice, the core aim of the game is to time and carefully manage gear changes to ensure that turns end at the required points while not requiring the player to set their gear too low and waste time speeding up again after the corner. Players may also wish to accept some damage to their tires in order to outpace rivals.

The Asmodée edition's Road Race rules add elements such as nitrous oxide, damaged pavement, and disgruntled citizens to the game. Each street race also has elements specific to it, such as the Police Station of Race City

== Spinoffs and expansions ==
Along with the two circuits that come with the main game, additional boards with different circuits on them are/were available. The additional circuits are purely expansion sets; you need a main board game (any edition) to use them. There are usually two circuits per package.

=== Ludodélire ===
Ludodélire produced 14 race circuits. The first 13 were color boards; the last was a black-and-white paper circuit included in a boxed expansion. Which one of the 13 color circuits was included in the boxed game depended on what country it was purchased in.

Ludodélire circuits
№ 1 – Grand Prix de MONACO	№ 8 – ESPAÑA – Circuit de Catalunya
№ 2 – FRANCE – Circuit de Nevers Magny-Cours	№ 9 – CANADA – Gilles Villeneuve
№ 3 – ITALIA – Autodromo Nazionale Monza	№ 10 – BRASIL – Circuito do Interlagos
№ 4 – DEUTSCHLAND – Hockenheim Ring	№ 11 – JAPAN – Suzuka
№ 5 – BELGIQUE – Circuit de Spa-Francorchamps	№ 12 – SOUTH of AFRICA – Kyalami Circuit
№ 6 – PORTUGAL – Estoril	№ 13 – SAN MARINO – Imola
№ 7 – BRITISH – Silverstone Circuit	World Championship – Grand Prix du MEXIQUE

A Ludodélire approved tournament player group produce the sanctioned ASPIFD Championship Kit, which included ten (or eleven) black-and-white paper tracks.

=== EuroGames ===
After the rights to the game passed to EuroGames, the game was published with the same two circuits included in all boxed sets. EuroGames reprinted the remaining 11 colour circuits and went on to print a further 22 new ones before their acquisition by Asmodée.

Set	EuroGames circuit	Set	EuroGames circuit
Basic game	№ 1 – Grand Prix de MONACO № 2 – NEDERLAND – Zandvoort № 1	FD- 9	№ 19 – SUZUKA – Japan № 20 – MELBOURNE – Australia
FD- 1	№ 3 – NEDERLAND – Zandvoort № 2 № 4 – BELGIQUE – Spa – Francorchamps	FD-10	№ 21 – BUDAPEST – Hungary № 22 – NÜRBURGRING – Germany
FD- 2	№ 5 – SOUTH AFRICA – Kyalami Circuit № 6 – SAN MARINO – Autodromo Ferrari (Imola)	FD-11	№ 23 – MONTEREY – California № 24 – PORTLAND – Oregon № 25 – ELKHART-LAKE – Wisconsin № 26 – INDIANAPOLIS – Indiana
FD- 3	№ 7 – FRANCE – Nevers Magny-Cours № 8 – ITALIA – Autodromo Nazionale Monza	FD-11	№ 23 – MONTEREY – California № 24 – PORTLAND – Oregon № 25 – ELKHART-LAKE – Wisconsin № 26 – INDIANAPOLIS – Indiana
FD- 4	№ 9 – PORTUGAL – Estoril № 10 – BRASIL – Interlagos	FD-12	№ 27 – DETROIT – Michigan № 28 – LEXINGTON – Ohio № 29 – ATLANTA – Georgia № 30 – DAYTONA BEACH – Florida
FD- 5	№ 11 – Watkìns Glen – New York № 12 – SILVERSTONE – England	FD-12	№ 27 – DETROIT – Michigan № 28 – LEXINGTON – Ohio № 29 – ATLANTA – Georgia № 30 – DAYTONA BEACH – Florida
FD- 6	№ 13 – MONTREAL – Canada № 14 – LONG BEACH – California	FD-13	№ 31 – ZHUHAI – China № 32 – SEPANG – Malaysia
FD- 7	№ 15 – HOCKENHEIM – Germany № 16 – ZELTWEG – Austria	FD-14	№ 33 – 10th Anniversary; An imaginary circuit, drawn to look unfinished.
FD- 8	№ 17 – BUENOS-AIRES – Argentina № 18 – BARCELONA – España	FD-15	№ 34 – Sakhir – BAHRAIN № 35 – SHANGHAI – China

==== Formula Dé: Mini ====
Formula Dé: Mini is a simplified version of the original game, similar to the Rules for Beginners of the Asmodée edition, that reduces the cars' statistics to one pool of “wear points” instead of the original game's six. The two race circuits are also half the size of the original ones, and are imaginary layouts as opposed to real-world circuits. This version can also use the expansion tracks for any edition of the game.

=== Asmodée ===
The boards produced by Asmodée are double sided, with a traditional Formula 1 race circuit on one side, and an urban street race on the other.

Set	Race Track	Street Race
Main Box	Circuit de Monaco	Race City (Fictional Raceway)
Expansion 1	Sebring International Raceway	East Park, Chicago (Fictional Raceway)
Expansion 2	HockenheimRing	Valencia Street Circuit
Expansion 3	Singapore	The Docks (Fictional Raceway)
Expansion 4	Buddh	Grand Prix of Baltimore
Expansion 5	Sochi	New Jersey (Fictional Raceway, based on proposed track layout for 2014 Formula One season)
Expansion 6	Austin	Nevada Ride (Fictional Raceway, based in Nevada)

Mini-expansions:

- A promotional extra driver/car—Catalina Santana with a yellow Porsche—was given away with the first shipment of the main boxed game.

== Variant rules ==
One criticism of the game is that a single square of movement rolled can make a significant difference. The standard case of this is that a roll that leaves the player ending a turn on the first square of a corner area is the best possible result, as they can then begin accelerating again immediately; whereas had the roll been one value lower, the car would have stopped just outside the corner area, which is the worst possible result as the player must ensure that their entire next move fits within the corner area. Some authors have proposed variant rules to correct this but they usually succeed only at moving the problem to a different roll value.

=== Redlining or slipping the clutch ===
One variant rule (and an official one at some Formula Dé tournaments), in response to the above criticism, is Redlining or Slipping the Clutch

Once per turn, any driver may add one space to their roll by "slipping the clutch." To do this the player must spend one engine point. When spending this point the car does not leave a debris counter.

=== Doubled straights ===
A popular house rule is doubled straights, where each space on a straight (i.e., not within a coloured corner area) requires two squares of movement to pass rather than one. On some circuits especially, this encourages the use of high gears (which is otherwise relatively rare) and makes the tactical timing for dealing with the corners even more important. It is very useful in adding elevation and slopage (hills) to a section of roadway.

== Reception ==
John Kovalic comments: "Aerodynamic as a Lamborghini, the mechanics behind Formula Dé are what let it break away from the pack of so-so speedway games. More than just another racing simulation, the game has become a hobby-market marvel in its own right. Indeed, after a decade and a half in the stores, it's remained as captivating as when it was first introduced."

== Reviews ==
- Backstab (Issue 3 - May/Jun 1997)

== In popular culture ==
Formula D was played by Wil Wheaton, Grace Helbig, Greg Benson, and Hannah Hart in the second season of Tabletop.
