= Schotten Totten =

Two player card game

- Box cover of Schotten Totten
- Designers: Reiner Knizia
- Publishers: Schmidt Spiele ASS; Pro Ludo; PS-Games Ubik
- Players: 2
- Setup time: 2 minutes
- Playing time: 30 minutes
- Chance: Medium
- Age range: 8 and up
- Skills: Strategic thought, Deduction

Schotten Totten is a card game designed by Reiner Knizia, first published in 1999. The name is a portmanteau of the German words "Schotten" (Scottish people) and "Hottentotten" (Hottentots).

== Gameplay ==
Gameplay in Schotten Totten resembles simultaneous play of nine separate hands of poker, but where each hand has only three cards in it. There are nine "boundary" stones between players at the start of the game. Players vie to win five of the stones, or three adjacent ones, to win the game.

== Other versions ==
In 2000, Schotten Totten was rethemed and sold under the name Battle Line (published by GMT Games) with similar gameplay, slightly altered rules (such as a player's hand size, and cards ranking from 1 to 10 in each of the six suits instead of from 1 to 9), artwork consisting of drawings of ancient soldiers (from the Macedonian and Persian cultures), and tactical cards which "introduce that random element that makes war continually surprising".

The 2004 reprinting of Schotten Totten added the ten tactical cards from Battle Line, a few of them being types of wild cards and others allowing you to affect the game in some way outside of the normal rules.
