= Evo (board game) =

Board game

- Box cover of the German edition
- Players: 3–5
- Setup time: 20 minutes
- Playing time: 90–120 minutes
- Chance: Medium
- Age range: 12 +
- Skills: Strategic thought

Evo: The Last Gasp of the Dinosaurs is a German-style board game for three to five players, designed by Philippe Keyaerts and published by Eurogames. The game won the GAMES Magazine award for Game of the year 2002. It was nominated for the Origins Award for Best Graphic Presentation of a Board Game 2000. In 2004 it was nominated for the Hra Roku. The game went out of print in 2007, and a second edition was released in 2011.

== Gameplay ==
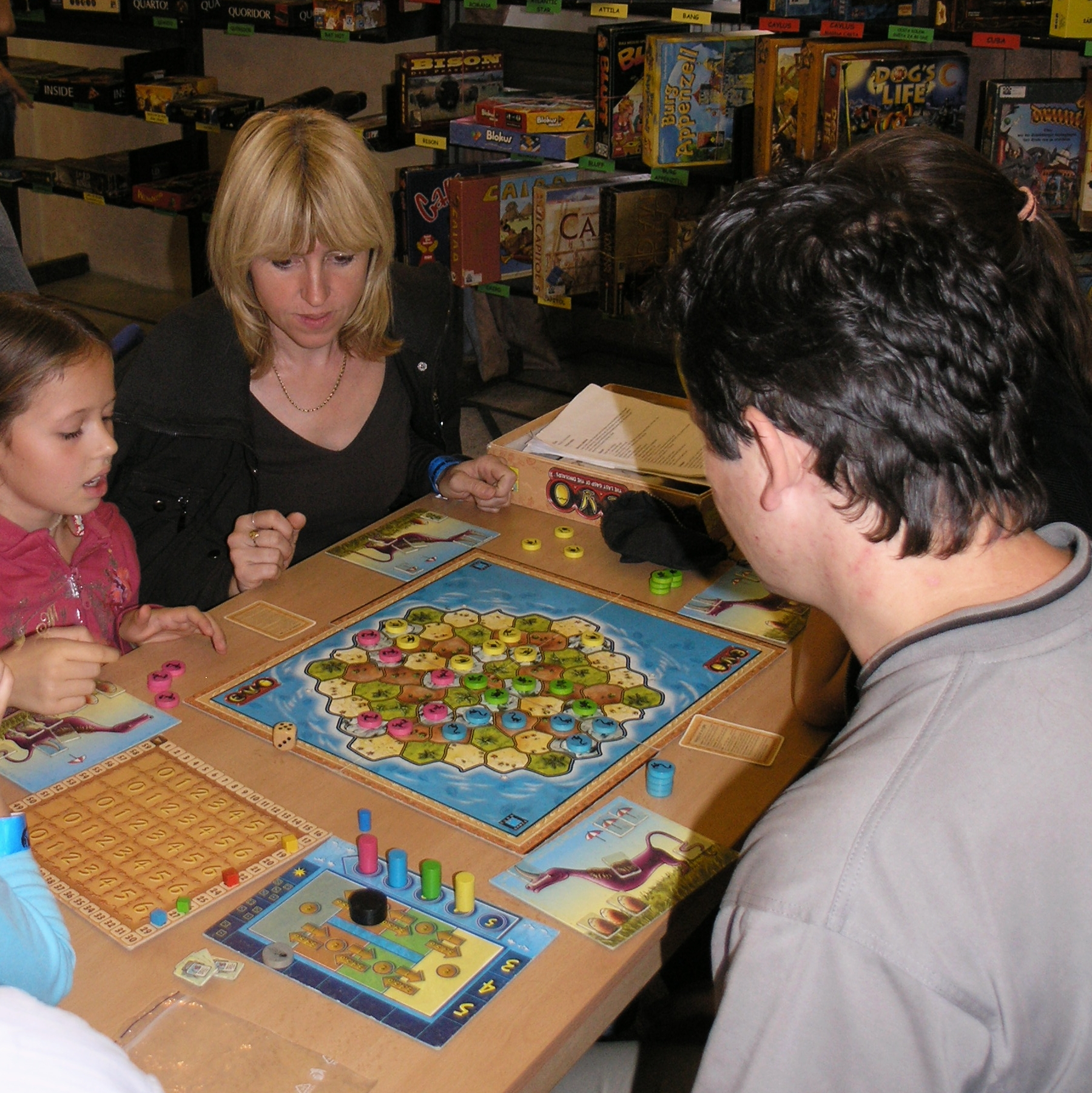
Evo

The main game board is made of two reversible sections; on each, the two sides contain differently-sized halves of a prehistoric island. The board can therefore be assembled in four ways:

- small-small for three players
- small-large or large-small for four players
- large-large for five players.

The island itself is made up of hexes of four different terrain types – desert, plains, hills and mountains. The game also uses a separate board for marking the current climate and round number, another for players scoring and bidding progress, and each player has a board to mark their dinosaur's mutations. The players' scores are also used as money during bidding phases.

Players start with three Event cards, a stack of dino tokens and a player board showing a dinosaur with: one egg, one leg, a tail, a horn-less face, one fur and one parasol, corresponding to most of the available mutations. For example the fur and parasol correspond to the species' ability to withstand cold and heat respectively. Each player places a dino token on their starting hex and a scoring marker on "10". Play proceeds through various phases:

1. Initiative – the order players will act in is determined by the number of tail mutations they have. Ties are resolved first in order of population size and then by roll-offs on a six-sided die.
2. Climate – a six-sided die is rolled to determine how the climate changes. Normally it proceeds in a cycle from hot to cold and back again, but on a 2 it stays the same, and on a 1 it moves in the opposite direction to the expected one.
3. Movement and Combat – players can move their dinos. The more leg mutations they have, the further they can move their dinos. If they attempt to move into a space occupied by another dino, they must fight. The aggressor is at a disadvantage unless they have more horn mutations than the defender.
4. Birth – players can add one new dino to the board for each egg mutation they possess, next to their existing dinos (including the egg they start with).
5. Survival and Mutation – dinos die off depending on climate and terrain, how many parasol or fur genes they have and event cards in force. The players then gain one point for each dino of their colour on the board.
6. Meteor and Evolution – In later turns, there is a chance that a Meteor strikes the island, ending the game. In earlier turns, and in later turns in which the game does not end, the players bid for new mutations; their (successful) bids are subtracted from their score. In addition to the starting mutations, there are gene mutations which make future purchases cheaper, and card mutations which give the player additional event cards.

Event cards can be used at various points to alter the game. The player with the most points when the game ends wins.

== Game interest ==
The simple strategy game at the core of Evo is made more interesting by the constantly changing climate. Positions which can be advantageous in one turn are often deadly a few turns later, so unlike many games where a winning player can come to dominate the game, the balance of power shifts frequently.

Unlike most German-style board games, in the first edition it is possible for a player to be eliminated if all his dino tokens are removed from the board. But this is very rare in practice. In the new edition, player elimination has been prevented by allowing players who only have two dinosaurs to be invulnerable during survival and combat phases. One of the many new unique gene abilities increases this limit to three, allowing players doing poorly to remain competitive.

== Reception ==
A year after awarding Evo its Game of the Year Award, Games commented:

Last Year's Game of the Year is so attractively presented that you could be easily distracted and forget just how challenging it is. [...] Evo, we predict, will never become extinct.

Tom Vasel was generally appreciative, casting it primarily as a family game:

Evo is an excellent game for the whole family to play, with a fun theme, and easy to learn, simple mechanics. The nonsensical artwork, the humorous dino portraits, and the fun game play makes this an excellent game of choice. There is some conflict, but it's not needed or really even that profitable, so people who delight in head-to-head confrontation may be disappointed. But I believe that this adds to the family value. If you’re looking for a good "gamer's game" to add to your collection, this may not be it.

Evo (second edition) has been evaluated in educational contexts, with the conclusion that it illustrates Evolutionary arms races, environmental-based versus competition-mediated adaptations, evolutionary and ecological physiology, interspecific interactions, Grinnellian niches, and climate change.

== Second Edition ==
The Second Edition was published in 2011. Whilst it kept most of the game intact it completely reworked the art away from the previous cartoonish style. Also some rule changes were introduced. For example players can now always bid on a new card. The designer said that these differences made for "different species from the start", the "new combat system makes Horns more interesting" and the new bidding system "makes the bidding more intense while giving something to each player".
