= Life as a BlackMan =

Board game

Life as a BlackMan is a board game designed by Chuck Sawyer and published by Underground Games. It was originally released in 1999. The object of the game is to be the first to reach the "Freedom" space at the top of the board.

== Gameplay ==
One player plays the role of the government; this role reads the prison cards, pays salaries, and handles legal transactions. The other players navigate the game as an 18-year-old African-American male or female. Players start by rolling a six-sided die to assign themselves one of three character types: Creative, Athletic, Intellectual. Next, players roll a six-sided die to be assigned one of four districts: Neighborhood, Military, university, Hollywood. The district determines the player's starting point.

During each turn, the player will roll a four-sided die and move their pawn. Throughout the game, players will land on spaces requiring an Action Card. These cards cover a variety of topics, which include, crime, church, and racism. There are 360 Action Cards included in the game. Depending on the card, the player may have to pay a fine, or move back spaces.

Players also are able to collect a salary when landing on the Payday spaces. Players can use this money for tasks such as, buying a car, getting married, and having children.

The game is won when a player successfully reaches the "Freedom" square on the board. The game typically lasts between 15 and 45 minutes.

== Equipment ==
- 1 24" x 24" game board
- 1 9" x 12" Prison Platform
- 1 4-sided die
- 1 6-sided die
- 6 game pawns
- 12 decks of Action Cards:
  - 25 GlamourWood cards
  - 25 Black University cards
  - 25 Military cards
  - 30 Ghetto cards
  - 25 Corporate America cards
  - 20 Church cards
  - 25 Prison cards
  - 25 Life cards
  - 50 Career cards
  - 25 Racism cards
  - 25 Crime cards
  - 25 Police cards
- 18 Character Type Cards:
  - 6 Creative
  - 6 Intellectual
  - 6 Athletic
- 14 Transportation Cards
  - 5 "No Car" cards
  - 3 "Bucket" cards
  - 2 "Used Mid-Size" cards
  - 2 "New Sub-Compact" cards
  - 2 "New SUV" cards
- 3 Debt cards
- A pack of BlackMan money

There are 360 cards in total.
