= Aladdin's Dragons =

Aladdin's Dragons is a 2000 bidding-based board game by Richard Breese. It is a reimplementation of his 1998 game Keydom.

== Gameplay ==
Each player controls a number of servants. The objective of the game is for each player to obtain as many artifacts as possible by buying them from the Caliph. In addition to being required to win, artifacts have magical powers which the player owning them can use to their advantage. In order to pay the Caliph for artifacts, the players must send servants to search for treasure.

The game board is divided into thirteen squares, each with a different effect. These in turn are divided into three areas: the bottom four squares represent the dragon caves, the middle four represent the town, and the top five represent the Caliph's palace. Each player has a set of servant tokens; each token is marked with a different number representing the power or skill of that servant. All players take turns placing servants (face down) in different squares on the board. A player may place several servants in an area in which case their numeric values are added together.

Once all players have placed all their servants, the servants on each square are turned face-up, and an effect is generated based on which square is being dealt with:

- Dragon caves: Each of the four dragon caves contains a series of "shelves" holding different amounts of treasure. These are generated randomly via cards at the start of each round. The player who sent the highest total value of servants to the cave gets to take all the treasure on the best shelf; the second highest total value takes the second best shelf; and so on.
- Caliph guard: The leftmost space of the Caliph's palace is the Caliph's guard. The Caliph's guard has a strength randomly determined at the start of each round but hidden to the players until they have finished placing servants. Any player who has not sent servants to the Caliph's guard with a total value equal to or greater than the strength of the guard is penalised: all other servants they have placed in the Caliph's palace are thrown out.
- Caliph's palace: Each other chamber of the Caliph's palace will hold an artifact. In each chamber, the player who has sent the highest value of servants to the chamber wins the artifact, but must "back up" his or her bid by paying treasure equal to the value of servants they placed.
- Town: the four spaces in town have certain special effects. At the trading post the player who sends the highest servant value may swap treasures for those of different types. At Aladdin's shop players may buy magic spell cards which affect future game play; the winner at the Djinn's house may use two artifacts in a turn (rather than just one, as normal) and the winner of the camel train gets to manipulate the order in which players take turns.

The game continues for a particular number of rounds, and then the player with the most artifacts is declared the winner.

== Reviews ==
- Pyramid
