= Deadwood (game) =

Board game

- 1st edition cover art by Phil Foglio, 1999
- Designers: James Ernest; Rick Fish
- Illustrators: Phil Foglio; Cheyenne Wright
- Publishers: Cheapass Games
- Publication: 1999

Deadwood is a board game published by Cheapass Games in 1999 in which players are actors trying to get roles in B-movies. The game proved popular, and was nominated for an Origins Award.

== Description ==
Deadwood is a game for 2-8 players where they spend their time trying to win roles as supporting or leading actors in low-budget movies.

=== Components ===
The game has a sheet of rules, a deck of 50 Scene cards; and an 4-piece board representing the movie lot of Deadwood Studios.

Players must supply a different colored die for each player, and either paper and pencil or play money for tracking money earned.

=== Setup ===
Each player's die, turned to 1, which represents the player's acting skill level, starts at the Trailers.

=== Gameplay ===
==== Auditioning ====
Players move around the ten studios on the lot, trying to pick up roles such as "man on fire," "woman in black dress," and "falls off roof." Each turn, a player's die enters a studio, and the player turns over a Scene card, which lists the movie to be shot, the number of main and supporting roles available, the acting rank needed for each, and the movie's budget. The player can choose to take on a leading role — which is more demanding but pays more — or a supporting role, which is easier to succeed at but pays less. The player may also choose to do nothing and move to another studio the next turn.

If the player's acting rank is below the rank needed for a role, than the player cannot take the role. If a player takes a role that is below their current rank, then they must reduce their rank accordingly.

==== Filming scenes ====
Once a scene has at least one cast member, filming can begin. The player whose turn it is, and who has already accepted a role, rolls a die to determine whether the scene succeeds or fails. A scene succeeds if the die roll is at least equal to the film's budget. Depending on the studio, the scene may require only one take (one die roll), or three takes (three die rolls, but only one per turn. If three actors have taken on roles in the movie, each can make a die roll on their turn.)

If the die roll fails, the scene has to be reshot starting on the next turn.

==== Rehearsal ====
In the Deadwood Studios USA edition, players can take a turn to rehearse, which gives them a +1 to their die roll.

==== Screen credits ====
The player who makes the final successful dice roll to end the scene receives an important bonus: an entry in the credits. If they played the main role, they place the scene card face up in front of them; if they played a supporting role, they place the scene card face down, which counts as half an entry.

If a supporting actor had the final die roll, all the lead actors in that scene must reduce their acting level by one.

==== Getting paid ====
A supporting actor is paid $1 at the end of the scene, regardless of success or failure, but a leading actor is only paid for a successful scene, and must roll a die and multiply that by the movie's budget to determine how much they are paid.

==== Increasing rank ====
A player can increase their rank at the Casting Office. Each upgrade requires one complete entry (a full scene card or two half-entries) per point of rank and $2 x the new rank. For example, to increase their rank from 2 to 5, the player would have to submit three complete entries and $10 (5 x $2).

==== Shooting days ====
There are ten scenes per day, but each shooting day ends after 9 scenes have been completed. The tenth scene is the "dog of the day", and it shuts down before it wraps. Any players who have taken roles in it lose a level for not being able to finish it.

==== Victory conditions ====
The game ends after 5 shooting days. Whoever has the most money at the end of the fifth day is the winner.

== Publication history ==
Cheapass Games was founded by James Ernest in 1995 when he had the revelation that most game owners have plenty of dice, counters, play money, and other common board game accessories, so there was no need to bundle all of these components with every game that requires them. The resultant games have only the bare necessities: rules, a board if needed, and proprietary cards or counters. One of these bare-bones games was Deadwood, designed by James Ernest and Rick Fish and published in 1999 with cover art by Phil Foglio.

A German-language version titled B-Movie was published by Truant Spiele in 2001.

Cheapass published several new 14-card decks for the game titled Another Day, Another Dollar, allowing the players to act in horror films, musicals, science fiction features and kung fu movies. These 14-card expansion decks added 10 new scenes in the given genre, and four "Special Effects" to the game, making for longer, more varied and more complex gameplay.

An expansion, Deadwood: On Location, was released in 2003 that included six new game boards representing various shooting locations.

In 2013, Cheapass released a revised edition titled Deadwood Studios USA.

== Reception ==
Pyramid stated "If you're already familiar with the games of James Ernest and his Cheapass friends, you probably don't need any convincing to get you to buy this game. If you haven't played their games before, Deadwood will make a great introduction to the company's knack for creative game mechanics, elegant simulations of "real-life" situations, and quirky humor." Three years later, Andy Vetromile reviewed Dead: On Location and commented that the game was "an improvement in many ways over the first production, and a simple and inexpensive one that Deadwood Studios USA, Cheapass Games, and the customer can all appreciate."

French games magazine Backstab reviewed the Deadwood: On Location expansion and rated it 2 out of 5 stars, expressing the wish that it had been a larger expansion.

Games including Deadwood in its "Top 100 Games of 1999".

Frank Gartner, writing for H@LL 9000, reviewed the German version of the game, B-Movie. Gartner liked the humor, saying "The various scenes, which are sure to elicit a chuckle or two, definitely enhance the fun" but warned "Anyone who doesn't like dice games should steer clear of B-Movie, because the game is a true dice orgy." Gartner also noted that the game worked best with a large number of players, stating "B-Movie only becomes fun and worthwhile when a certain level of interaction and a frantic pace from film to film develops, and this is only the case with at least six players. With fewer players, we stopped the game after one day of filming because there was no dynamic whatsoever." Gartner concluded by giving the game a rating of 3 out of 6, saying, "anyone who can gather at least 6 to 8 players for a casual game can enjoy 60-90 minutes of fast-paced dice-rolling fun, provided everyone at the table tries to play through the game quickly. The game relies heavily on luck and will therefore only appeal to those who don't necessarily require a tactical approach from their game."

== Awards ==
At the 1999 Origins Awards, Deadwood was a finalist for "Best Abstract Board Game".
