= Sketch! =

- Publisher: Corsair Publishing
- Publication date: 2000

Sketch! is a 2000 role-playing game published by Corsair Publishing.

== Gameplay ==
Sketch! is a superhero game where anything players draw becomes their character, battling for good or evil on Planet Sketch.

== Reviews ==
- Pyramid
- Polyhedron #145
- Games Unplugged #1 (June/July, 2000)
- Knights of the Dinner Table Magazine #48 (Oct., 2000)
- ODDS: The Tabletop Roleplaying E-Magazine (Issue 1 - Oct 2008)
