= X-Men Trading Card Game =

Collectible card game

- Designers: Mike Fitzgerald
- Publishers: Wizards of the Coast
- Players: 2
- Playing time: Approx 20 min
- Chance: High due to dice rolling
- Age range: 10+
- Skills: Card playing Arithmetic; Basic reading ability

Released by Wizards of the Coast in 2000, the X-Men Trading Card Game was a collectible card game (CCG) designed to coincide with the popularity of the film X-Men, the first of the X-Men film series. This set had featured character art similar to that of film and included characters who did not appear in the movie. It was released in July 2000.

== Background ==
The X-Men Trading Card Game was a joint-release of Wizards of the Coast (WotC), Marvel Entertainment, and Twentieth Century Fox. All three companies involved with the game required that certain criteria be met in the final product. WotC was responsible for the structural design of the game; Marvel was to provide the artwork; Fox determined the overall look of the characters depicted in the cards.

The game was released in the summer of 2000. Delays with the Marvel art department meant that the booster packs did not reach the retail market for months after the release of the starter decks.

An expansion set, "Generations", was designed shortly after the release of the base set. A 100-card set—never produced but printed on mock-up sheets dubbed the Generations God Book by WotC staff—would have featured new X-Men such as Iceman, Gambit, Cable, Nightcrawler, and White Queen, and villains including Pyro, Lady Deathstrike, Arcade, Spiral, and the Acolytes. It would also have introduced split-color cards that counted as the color of the player's choice. With WotC working independently of outside parties, the set was ready, complete with final text and card art, ahead of schedule.

The game's only promotional cards featured Halle Berry, Famke Janssen, Anna Paquin, Patrick Stewart, Hugh Jackman, and James Marsden as their respective film characters: Storm, Jean Grey, Rogue, Professor X, Wolverine, and Cyclops. The Wolverine card was distributed at cinemas to moviegoers purchasing tickets to X-Men, while the Storm card was given to customers at hobby and game shops. The remaining promotional actor cards were slated to be awarded as prizes at sanctioned X-Men TCG events, but neither tournaments nor competitive leagues were established.

== Gameplay ==
This collectible strategy game combined standard TCG game elements with a dice-rolling game mechanic, then a seldom-used core feature in trading card games. The game employed a well-designed, yet simple, concept of a player's team of X-Men attempting to defeat, or KO, two of four selected X-Men villains before the opponent did the same. Alternatively, a player could win the game if their opponent's team was knocked out before their own. Each X-Men character card was assigned a point value based on its mutant power (a special ability printed on the card that had an effect on game play, such as allowing the user to draw extra cards or deal additional damage to enemies), hit points (the amount of damage necessary to KO the character), and its ratings in each of three abilities (red-fighting, green-energy, and blue-X factor). These points were used to construct a team of two to five X-Men totaling 30 points or less. Players used "lightning" and "power-up" cards to create game effects, including preventing damage done to characters and increasing the ability ratings of a selected character, and used "mission" and "momentum" cards to launch team attacks on the villains or the opponent's team. Dice were rolled to determine the amount of damage dealt to the villain and the team, as well as which mutant powers were triggered in the battle. The turns were marked by the "danger room level", a sequentially increasing number that allowed cards of escalating power and effect to be played with each passing turn.

== Promotional cards ==
- P0 Wolverine
- P1 Cyclops
- P2 Jean Grey
- P3 Professor X
- P4 Rogue
- P5 Storm
- P6 Wolverine
- More details found here

== Reviews ==
- Syfy
