= Starfarers of Catan =

1999 multiplayer board game

The Starfarers of Catan
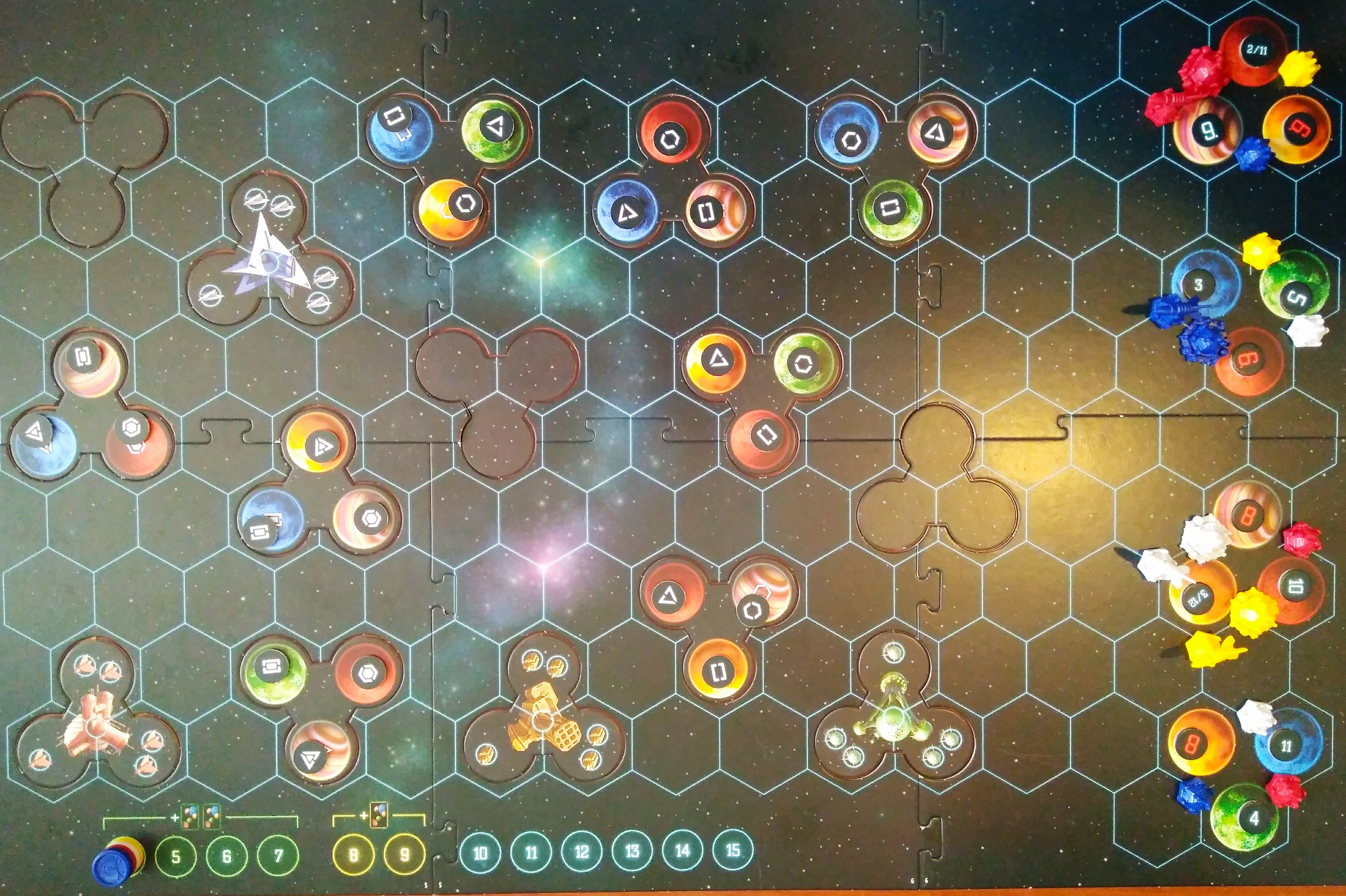
- Designers: Klaus Teuber
- Publishers: Kosmos (Germany); Mayfair Games (U.S.)
- Publication: 1999
- Players: 3 or 4 (standard); 5 or 6 (with expansions)
- Playing time: 120 minutes
- Age range: 12 years and up
- Website: catan.com

Starfarers of Catan is a multiplayer, space-themed board game loosely based on the Catan series of games. It was created by Klaus Teuber as an official spin-off to Settlers of Catan and is distributed by Kosmos in German and Mayfair Games in English.

== Setting ==
Starfarers takes place in a futuristic setting where, in the distant future, the human race has perfected a method to travel faster than light. As a result, it settles on a distant star system known as Catan, where it encounters five peaceful alien races: the Green Folk, the Scientists, the Merchants, the Diplomats, and the Travelers, as well as an intergalactic council that serves as the diplomatic body in the Catanian sector. The players serve as the role of Catanians operating a fleet that seek to colonize unknown planets in order to ensure the growth of humanity, while maintaining strong ties to these alien races.

Although Starfarers uses much of the same game mechanic as Settlers, there are many differences, the most notable of which was the use of a fixed game board and the use of moving ships. Like Settlers, gameplay is mainly played on the intersections of a hexagonal grid.

== Objective ==
Like other games in the Catan series, the objective of Starfarers is to score a number of Victory Points—in this game, fifteen Victory Points are required to win the game. Unlike other Catan games, however, the fixed board contains a "victory point" track that aids players in keeping track of the scores for all players (so long as it is sufficiently updated).

== Equipment ==
Whereas Settlers is light in terms of equipment due to its modular structure, Starfarers requires a large amount of equipment to play.

=== The Board ===
The fixed board is a noticeable feature of Starfarers. At the beginning, the players have settled the Catanian colonies, represented by planets along the bottom edge of the gameboard. The players must expand to other planets in the middle and on the other side of the board. Along the edges of the board are the home planets of four of the five alien races (the 5-6 player expansion also includes the home planets of the fifth race), where trading posts may be established for victory points and additional benefits.

=== The Mother Ship ===
Each player begins with a "mother ship", a small model spaceship that represents the overall power of their starships during the game. The mother ship also acts as a die - by turning the ship over and shaking well, one can roll the die such that, when the ship is placed on a flat surface, two of four colored balls will be revealed at the bottom.

Over the course of the game, the mother ship can be equipped with up to four add-ons: freight rings representing the trading ability of the player's ships, boosters representing the speed of the player's ships, cannons representing combat ability, and fame rings representing the overall fame of the player's ships. At the start of the game, each player begins with only a single fame ring, and, in a 5-6 player game, a booster and either a freight ring or a cannon.

A player may have up to six boosters, six cannons, and five freight rings, as well as ten fame rings. The former three are also referred to collectively as expansions of the ship.

=== Number Tokens ===
Like Settlers, Starfarers contains a series of number tokens. Some of these are specifically designated for the Catanian systems, some are designated for the colonizable planets in the middle of the board, and some are kept in reserve. Each planetary system consists of three planets, which have either a red, blue, or yellow dot on it - at the start of the game, a number token with the corresponding dot on the back is placed face down over the planet. Likewise, the number tokens for the Catanian planets have a Greek letter on the back, with the tokens being placed randomly such that the Greek letters match the group of planets they are referring to.

Like Settlers, the standard number tokens are ranged from 2 to 12, with tokens for 6 and 8 being in red. The background of the token contains phases of the moon, and is an indicator of the relative probability of rolling a number with two dice. There are also special number tokens, which serve a special purpose in the game. In the 5-6 player expansion, the background may also have a blue tint - these are to be solely used with the new planetary systems introduced in the expansion.

=== Transporters ===
Each player is also given three transporters, which can be combined with a colony to form a colony ship, or a trading post to form a trade ship. Each transporter has a fixed number of rings at the front of the ship - the transporter in play with the fewest rings is referred to as the player's first ship. Colony ships are used to form colonies and trade ships are used to form trading posts. When either is established, the transporter is returned to the player's reserves, allowing for its reuse.

=== Resources ===
As in Settlers, there are five resources in the game, each of them being represented by resource cards. There are 20 of each resource in a 3-4 player game and 30 of each resource in a 5-6 player game. At the start of the game, 12 cards of each resource type are shuffled together to form a reserve pile. If this reserve is exhausted at any point in the game, six cards of each resource type (ten in a 5-6 player game) are shuffled together to form the reserve pile.

== Starting the Game ==
To begin a game, each player begins by placing either a colony or spaceport in a guerilla fashion (similar to the setup in Settlers). Two colonies and a spaceport are placed in such a manner among the Catanian colonies (one spaceport and one colony in a 5-6 player game), with the player choosing the order in which colonies and spaceports are placed. The player is also given a free colony or trade ship, which is placed in any intersection adjacent to the player's spaceport.

In a three-player game, there is also the restriction where only two of the three colonizable intersections in a system of planets may be occupied at any given time, the setup phase notwithstanding.

After setting up the initial colonies and ships, each player draws three cards from the reserve pile to begin the game.

== Playing the Game ==
Each turn consists of three main phases - production, trading and building, and flight.

As in Settlers, two dice are rolled, and, if a 7 is not rolled, any planet with a matching number token produces one resource for every nearby colony or spaceport. If a 7 is rolled, however, every player with more than seven resource cards must return half of their resources (rounded down), akin to discarding on a 7 in Settlers, and the player on move may afterwards steal a resource card from another player.

Unlike in Settlers, however, if there are insufficient resources for all of the players, resources may still be collected, starting with the player on move and proceeding in turn until there are no remaining resources.

If a player has less than nine Victory Points, they are also entitled to draw a card (two in a 5-6 player game) from the reserve pile, regardless of the outcome of the dice.

=== Trading and Building ===
Buildings at a Glance
Name	Carbon	Food	Fuel	Ore	Trade
Booster	-	-	2	-	-
Cannon	2	-	-	-	-
Colony Ship	1	1	1	1	-
Freight Ring	-	-	-	2	-
Spaceport	3	2	-	-	-
Trade Ship	-	-	1	1	2

By producing resources, a player may trade them or use them to build items. Trading and building may be done in any order. Players may trade resources with opponents for any agreed upon price (although as with Settlers the player on move must be involved in every such transaction), or they may trade with the Galactic Bank. When trading with the Galactic Bank, the player may trade resources at a three-to-one rate, or two-to-one in the case of the trade good resource. This rate may be improved with Merchant friendship cards.

=== Spaceports ===
A player may choose to upgrade their colonies to spaceports. Unlike in Settlers, there is no increased production to spaceports - however, ships may be deployed at intersections adjacent to spaceports, which may be convenient as the Catanian colonies are considerably distant from the planets in the middle of the board and the trading bases at the edges of the board. Each player begins the game with one spaceport, and may build two additional spaceports over the course of the game.

=== Spaceships ===
If a colony ship or a trade ship is built, the ship is placed on any intersection adjacent to one of their spaceports. There is no requirement as to which of a player's available transporters are to be used - if the transporter with one ring is in use and a new ship is built, the player may choose whether the newly built ship becomes the player's first ship (by choosing the transporter with no rings) or whether the existing ship retains the first ship designation (by choosing the transporter with two rings).

A player is given a total of nine colonies and seven trading posts.

=== The Extended Building Phase ===
In a 5-6 player game, if a player chooses to build during their turn, the other players may also build (but not trade, unless it is with the player on move) during that turn.

=== Flight ===
After trading and building, the player may move their ships. The mother ship is rolled, and depending on the outcome, a base speed is established. This is added to the number of boosters in a player's possession to determine the number of intersections that a ship may be moved.

Ships that are moving are subject to several restrictions:

- A ship may travel through colonies, trading posts, or other ships, but may not stop on an occupied intersection.
- A trade ship may not stop at an intersection where a colony may be established.
- A colony ship may not stop at an intersection where a trade post may be established.
- A ship may not actively engage in blockading opposing spaceports - only a player's own ships is permitted to stop on intersections adjacent to spaceports.
- Similarly, a ship may not actively engage in blockading colony sites or trade post sites - if a colony ship begins on a colonizable intersection, they cannot end on the same intersection unless the player intends to build a colony there, or they are rendered immobile as a result of an encounter. Likewise with trade ships and sites for trading posts.
- A trade ship may only be moved onto an outpost intersection if they satisfy the requirements for building trading outposts there.

==== Encounters ====
If a black ball is rolled, then the player's first ship makes an encounter. Another player is chosen to draw and read an encounter card, which may be one of several kinds:

- The ship may encounter a Merchant, to which the player may give up to three resources. As a result, one of four possible outcomes may occur, with better outcomes generally corresponding to more resources given.
- The ship may encounter a pirate who demands a certain number of resources. The player may either choose to acquiesce to the pirate's demands, or choose to fight.
- The ship may encounter a pirate who offers the player to rob other players for a price. If a player accepts the offer, the mother ship is rolled, and one of three possible outcomes may occur - typically higher rolls give better outcomes.
- The ship may encounter a pirate that attacks the first ship outright. The player is offered the option to escape or directly engage the pirates, being forced to fight if unable to escape.
- The ship may encounter another ship being attacked by the pirates, with the player choosing between ignoring the ship or intervening by engaging the pirates.
- The ship may encounter a pirate disguised as a Merchant, to which the player initially gives up to three resources (as in Merchant encounters) but may be forced to fight to regain them (as in pirate attacks).
- The ship may encounter a Traveler, to which the player may give up to three resources. One of three possible outcomes may occur, with better outcomes generally corresponding to more resources given.
- The ship may encounter another ship in distress, which the player may choose to rescue.
- The ship may encounter pirates who offer to trade one resource for two resources - if the player accepts, the mother ship is rolled, and one of three possible outcomes may occur.
- The ship may encounter a wormhole, and may choose to make a space jump. If a player declines, a second encounter card is drawn. If a player accepts, the player's boosters are compared to another player's, with a successful jump made only if the player has a strictly greater number.
- Every players suffers from spaceship wear and tear, and must remove an expansion (either a booster, cannon, or freight ring) should they have too many. In any case, a new encounter is drawn.

In a number of encounter cards the players may be forced to fight the pirates - the card specifies which player is to represent the pirates. Both the player on move and the player chosen to represent the pirates roll their mother ships and add the number of cannons on their ships to represent their respective combat strengths - the player wins against the pirates only if their combat strength is strictly higher. If the player loses, the player's first ship may be rendered immobile, and an expansion may be lost, but the player may be awarded a fame ring as a consolation for attempting to actively engaging the pirates. Conversely, if a player declines to engage the pirates fame rings may be lost for cowardice. If a player is victorious over the pirates, the player typically receives a reward of resources and fame rings, but may also be awarded expansions, trade ships, or space jumps.

Similarly, some encounter cards may require the player to compare speeds with another player, with both players rolling their mother ships and adding the number of boosters to represent their ship's speed.

At the end of an encounter, the base speed is set to 3.

== Exploration ==
If a ship is on any intersection bordering a planet, the player has the option of examining the number token there, if it is face-down. This may be done while the ship is in motion. Colony ships entering the colony intersection may examine the number tokens on both adjacent planets.

Special number tokens may be encountered as a result of examining number tokens - all of which are on number tokens with red dots on their backs: pirate lairs, ice planets, and (in the 5-6 player expansion) artifact sites. These special number tokens must be removed and replaced with a number token from the reserve pile if a colony is to be established at either of the two colonizable intersections next to the planet.

- Pirate lairs (indicated by a picture of a cannon next to the number) may be eliminated if a player has at least a number of cannons equal to the number shown on the number token.
- Ice planets (indicated by a picture of a freight ring under the number) may be eliminated if a player has at least a number of freight rings equal to the number shown on the number token.
- Artifact sites (indicated by a picture of a friendship card next to the number) may be eliminated if a player has trading posts with at least a number of alien races equal to the number shown on the number token.

A ship must be adjacent to the planet next to the special number token for the token to be removed. Removing these special tokens award the player one Victory Point, but ends the ship's movement. A player may, after removing a special number token, examine its replacement. If a colony ship eliminates a special number token on a colonizable intersection, it may establish a colony at the location.

=== Space Jumps ===
As a result of encounters or friendship cards, a player's ships may be able to make a space jump in lieu of normal movement. This allows the ship to move to any unoccupied space on the board, subject to normal flight restrictions.

=== Trading Outposts ===
Each of the four alien bases (five in a 5-6 player game) has set up a trading base, situated on the edges of the map. A player may choose to establish a trading post at these bases. Each base is surrounded by five numbered intersections, representing the number of freight rings a player requires in order for one of their trade ships to land at the intersection so that a trading post can be established. Trading posts must be built in numerical order, and when a trading post is established, they are entitled to a Friendship Card from the aliens, which may grant the player special abilities. The trading outpost and Friendship Card are not subsequently lost if the player subsequently loses freight rings - the numbered intersections only serve to determine the order in which trading posts must be established, and the requirements for establishing one therein. Thus, it is advantageous for the player to establish trading posts at the earliest possible moment, so that the player has the first choice of Friendship cards.

A player with the majority of trading posts with an alien race is entitled to the race's Friendship Token, worth two Victory Points. If two or more players are tied for this distinction, the Friendship Token is given to the player (among the tied players) who built the earliest outpost (i.e. the one at the lowest number).

Friendship cards take effect once obtained, and remain in effect for the remainder of the game. Friendship cards may not be traded, and may not be exchanged for another friendship card from the same race. The Traveler cards are only available when playing a 5-6 player game.

Friendship Cards at a Glance
Name	Race	Effect name	Effect
Asa-Bar	Scientists	Combined Increase	Increases all ship speeds by one and combat strengths by one (as if an extra cannon and an extra booster were added).
Asox	Green Folk	Production Increase: Ore	Receive an extra ore if any colony produces ore.
Axxa	Green Folk	Production Increase: Fuel	Receive an extra fuel if any colony produces fuel.
Crizzetu	Merchants	Ore Exchange 2:1	Allows two-to-one exchanges with ore.
Esox	Green Folk	Production Increase: Food	Receive an extra food if any colony produces food.
Ezzel	Merchants	Trade Goods Exchange 1:1	Trade one trade good for any other resource once per turn.
Hir-Akas	Scientists	Increased Speed	Increases all ship speeds by two (as if two extra boosters were added).
Hir-Sto	Scientists	Combined Increase	Increases all ship speeds by one and combat strengths by one (as if an extra cannon and an extra booster were added).
Kha-Star	Scientists	Combat Strength Increase	Increases all ship combat strengths by two (as if two extra cannons were added).
Khor-Nem	Scientists	Combined Increase	Increases all ship speeds by one and combat strengths by one (as if an extra cannon and an extra booster were added).
Orzel	Merchants	Food Exchange 2:1	Allows two-to-one exchanges with food.
Ra Hal	Diplomats	Reduced Tribute	Allows a player to hold up to twelve cards before discarding on a 7.
Ra Hna	Diplomats	A Helping Hand	May steal a resource from up to two players each turn, as long as the player has less victory points.
Ra Hno	Diplomats	Galactic Relief Fund	May take one resource on an otherwise unproductive roll (7 notwithstanding).
Re Bah	Diplomats	Fame for Sale	May buy fame rings for one trade good each, as long as a player has less than six.
Re Ohn	Diplomats	Fame for Sale	May buy fame rings for one trade good each, as long as a player has less than six.
Tro-Taphon	Travelers	Small Donation	May ask the player in the lead for a specific resource - if it is not given an expansion must be given instead.
Tro-Thel	Travelers	Encounter Selector	An encounter may be declined when a black ball is rolled, or requested when it is not. The base speed is set to 3 if this ability is used.
Tro-Theran	Travelers	Space Jump	May space jump any ship if a black ball was not rolled and the player has at least five boosters.
Tro-Therum	Travelers	Fame and Honor	May ask another player for a specific resource - if it is not given the other player loses a fame ring.
Tro-Towar	Travelers	Space Jump	May space jump any ship if a black ball was not rolled and the player has at least five boosters.
Utuzzo	Merchants	Fuel Exchange 2:1	Allows two-to-one exchanges with fuel.
Xom	Green Folk	Production Increase: Trade Goods	Receive an extra trade good if any colony produces trade goods.
Xulu	Green Folk	Production Increase: Carbon	Receive an extra Carbon if any colony produces Carbon.
Zuzzo	Merchants	Carbon Exchange 2:1	Allows two-to-one exchanges with Carbon.

== Winning ==
A player wins if, on their turn, they have at least fifteen Victory Points. Victory Points may be awarded from the following:

- One Victory Point is awarded for each colony.
- Two Victory Points are awarded for each spaceport.
- Two Victory Points are awarded for each friendship token.
- One Victory Point is awarded for removing pirate lairs, ice planets, or artifact sites.
- One Victory Point is awarded for every two fame rings. A single odd fame ring does not earn partial Victory Points.

== Release ==
The game was first released in 1999 for three to four players, Kosmos and Mayfair released an expansion in 2001 to allow up to two additional players.

== Reception ==
An entry from The Encyclopedia of Science Fiction praised the game's "consciously nostalgic" components and engagement, but criticised its accessibility in contrast to the base game.

== Reviews ==
- Pyramid
- Syfy
