= 2007 in games =

This page lists board and card games, wargames, miniatures games, and tabletop role-playing games published in 2007. For video games, see 2007 in video gaming.

== Games released or invented in 2007 ==
- 1960: The Making of the President
- About Time
- Aces & Eights: Shattered Frontier (role-playing game)
- Age of Steam - America/Europe
- Age of Steam - Austria & India
- Age of Steam - Barbados/St. Lucia
- Age of Steam - Jamaica/Puerto Rico
- Age of Steam - Mexico, Spain/Portugal
- Age of Steam - Mississippi Steamboats/Golden Spike
- Age of Steam - Montréal Métro
- Age of Steam - The Netherlands
- Age of Steam - War in Iraq & New York Subway
- Agricola
- Apples to Apples: Jewish Edition
- Arkham Horror: King in Yellow Expansion
- Axis & Allies: Guadalcanal
- Axis & Allies Naval Miniatures: War at Sea
- Bang! The Bullet (Deluxe version of Bang!)
- Barca
- Battlefield Evolution (Mongoose Publishing)
- BattleLore: Call to Arms
- BattleLore: Dwarven Battalion Specialist Pack
- BattleLore: Epic BattleLore
- BattleLore: Goblin Marauders Specialist Pack
- BattleLore: Goblin Skirmishers Specialist Pack
- BattleLore: The Hundred Years' War - Crossbows & Polearms
- Bendomino
- Bleach Trading Card Game
- Bookchase
- Brass
- Ca$h'n'Gun$: Live
- Ca$h’n Gun$: les Yakuzas
- Carcassonne - Travel Edition
- Catan Dice Game
- Caylus Magna Carta
- Chaotic Trading Card Game
- China Rails
- Cineplexity
- Civil War Stratego
- Coin Hopping—Washington D.C.
- Colosseum
- Container
- Cutthroat Caverns
- De Bellis Magistrorum Militum
- Die Siedler von Catan – Das Würfelspiel
- Galaxy Trucker
- The Game of Life: Twists & Turns
- Glenn Drover's Empires: The Age of Discovery
- Great War at Sea: Zeppelins
- Grey Ranks (role-playing game)
- GridIron Master
- HeroScape: Master Win Chiu Woo
- Heroscape Expansion Set: Aquilla's Alliance
- Heroscape Expansion: Defenders of Kinsland
- Heroscape Expansion Set: Fields of Valor
- Heroscape Expansion Set: Ticalla Jungle
- Hive - The Mosquito
- Illuminati: Bavarian Fire Drill
- Infantry Attacks: Empires End
- It's Alive!
- Khet 3D: Tower of Kadesh
- Kill Doctor Lucky... and His Little Dog, Too!
- Killer Bunnies and the Quest for the Magic Carrot Ominous ONYX Booster
- Last Night on Earth
- Legend: Hand of God
- Kingdom Hearts Trading Card Game
- Lord of the Rings - Battlefields
- Man Laws & Woman Rules
- Marrakech
- Marvel Heroes Stratego
- Mighty Empires (Expansion for Warhammer Fantasy Battle)
- Munchkin 5: De-Ranged
- Munchkin Cthulhu
- Munchkin Cthulhu 2 - Call of Cowthulhu
- Munchkin Quest
- Munchkin Rigged Demo
- Pandemic
- Panzer Grenadier: Alaska's War
- Panzer Grenadier: Fronte Russo
- Panzer Grenadier: Iron Curtain
- Panzer Grenadier: North Wind
- Panzer Grenadier: South Africa's War
- Panzer Grenadier: White Eagles
- Ponte del Diavolo
- Power Yahtzee
- Qwirkle
- Race for the Galaxy
- Realm of the Jade Goddess
- Risk Transformers
- Rome at War III: Queen of the Celts
- Runebound - Beasts and Bandits
- Runebound - Curse of the Cataclysm
- Runebound - Quest of the Seven Scions
- Runebound - Rituals and Runes
- Runebound - Sands of Al-Kalim
- Runebound - Traps and Terrors
- Runebound - Weapons of Legend
- Saint Petersburg Expansion
- Scion (role-playing game)
- Song of Blades and Heroes
- StarCraft: The Board Game
- Stonehenge
- Starship Troopers Evolution
- Stratego Transformers
- Tannhäuser
- TerraDrive (role-playing game)
- Ticket to Ride: Switzerland
- Tide of Iron
- TZAAR
- Victory at Sea
- Wings of War - Dawn of War
- Witch Hunter: The Invisible World (role-playing game)
- Zombie Fluxx
- Zombies!!! 6: Six Feet Under
- Zooloretto

== Game awards given in 2007 ==
- Spiel des Jahres: Zooloretto
- Games: Pillars of the Earth
- Brass won the Spiel Portugal Jogo do Ano.

== Significant game-related events in 2007 ==
- An article published in Science announced that Checkers (Draughts) is a solved game. With perfect play by both sides, the game ends in a draw.

== Deaths ==
Date	Name	Age	Notability
February 9	Alejandro Finisterre	87	Inventor of table football
March 9	Tom Moldvay	58	RPG designer, known for work on Dungeons & Dragons
May 15	Angus McBride	76	illustrator, known for work on Middle-earth Role Playing
July 19	Glen Angus	36	illustrator, known for work on Dungeons & Dragons and Magic: The Gathering
September 2	Franz-Benno Delonge	50	Board game designer

== See also ==
- List of game manufacturers
- 2007 in video gaming
