= Great War at Sea: U.S. Navy Plan Orange =

- Designers: Michael Bennighof
- Publishers: Avalanche Press
- Genres: Board wargame
- Players: 2
- Playing time: 30+ minutes

Great War at Sea: U.S. Navy Plan Orange is a board wargame designed by Michael Bennighof and published by Avalanche Press in 1998. It is part of the Great War at Sea board game series.

== Overview ==
The game is based on United States Navy plans on a hypothetical naval battle between United States and Japan in 1930s.

== Reception ==
Great War at Sea: Plan Orange won the Origins Awards for Best Historical Board Game of 1998.
