= It's Alive =

It's Alive may refer to:

== Film and television ==
- "It's alive", a phrase used in the film Frankenstein (1931) and its sequels
- "It's alive", a phrase used in the film Rosemary's Baby (1968)
- "It's alive!", a phrase said in the opening sequence of the American stop-motion television series Robot Chicken
- It's Alive! (1969 film), an American TV film directed by Larry Buchanan
- It's Alive (1974 film), a horror film directed by Larry Cohen
- It's Alive (2009 film), a remake of the 1974 horror film
- It's Alive! (TV series), a YTV variety show that aired from 1994 to 1997
- It’s Alive!, an episode of the Japanese-American animated television series Hi Hi Puffy AmiYumi
- "It's Alive!" (Dexter), a 2007 episode of Dexter
- It's Alive with Brad Leone, a Bon Appétit web series hosted by Brad Leone since 2016

== Music ==
- It's Alive! (The New Cars album), a 2006 album by The New Cars
- It's Alive (Ozark Mountain Daredevils album), 1978
- It's Alive (Ramones album), a 1979 live album by the Ramones
  - It's Alive (Parasites album), a 1996 cover album
- It's Alive 1974–1996, a 2007 live DVD by the Ramones
- It's Alive, a 2018 album by John 5
- "It's Alive", song from the musical Zombie Prom
- It's Alive (La Luz album), 2013

== Other ==
- It's Alive (band), a glam-style metal band
- It's Alive! (card game), a card game
