= Age of Mythology: The Boardgame =

Board game

- Box art for Age of Mythology: The Boardgame
- Publishers: Eagle Games
- Publication: 2003
- Players: 4

Age of Mythology: The Boardgame is a board game created by Glenn Drover based on the video game Age of Mythology. It was released in 2003 by Eagle Games. Up to four players may play the game, but extra parts may be purchased from Eagle Games to allow eight players to play.

== Gameplay ==
Age of Mythology: The Boardgame adapts the real-time strategy video game into a tabletop game for two to four players, dividing gameplay into turn-based phases and using cards for resources and god powers, while featuring hundreds of miniatures to represent units from the digital version.

Like the video game it is based on, players control one of three civilizations: the Greeks, the Egyptians, and the Norse. Up to two players may play any given civilization (with additional parts, up to three players may play any civilization), and players are situated so that players playing the same civilization do not sit adjacent to each other.

As with the video game, players must gather resources, build units, and attack other players. Unlike the video games, however, players play for victory points, which may be earned by winning battles, by trading resources for them, having the largest army at the end of the game, having the most buildings built at the end of the game, or by building the wonder.

At the start of the game, each player is given an individual board, which is divided into two areas: the Production Area and the City Area, as well as a limited supply of resources, units, and production tiles, which are placed in the Production Area. On each turn, players must allot three victory points to one of four special victory point cards: the "Largest Army", the "Most Buildings", and the Wonder, which are only claimed at the end of the game, or "Won the Last Battle", claimed during a player's turn. Afterwards, each player draws Action Cards from either their civilization's Permanent Action Deck (which is unique to each player, though each civilization has identical cards) or Random Action Deck (which is shared between players with the same civilization) until they reach a hand limit determined by their Age (with later ages increasing the hand limit). Players in turn may play up to three of their hand cards, resolving any effects, before discarding cards or resources (each player may keep at most five units of any resource, eight with possession of a special building, at the end of the turn), if necessary.

=== Action Cards ===
The core mechanic are the Action Cards: the Permanent Action Cards may be chosen as needed, but tend to have weaker effects compared to the Random Action Cards. These allow players to add production tiles to a player's Production Area, assign workers to production tiles, gather resources, build units or buildings, trade resources, advance in age, and attack other players. Certain Random Action Cards are also God Powers, which have an additional effect if resources are paid. Because Permanent Action Cards are always available each turn, they are typically discarded if unused at the end of the turn.

=== Buildings ===
Buildings have secondary effects, which include receiving discounts for purchases, improved actions, or additional villagers to work the Production Area. With the exception of the House, which supplies villagers, players are restricted to one of any given type of building. Villagers are placed or moved about on production tiles in the Production Area whenever their owner plays a Gather action, which collects resources based on which production tiles a player's villagers reside. The Explore Action may be used to increase the number of production tiles a player has in their Production Area. Resources may be traded with the bank using the Trade action, and a building allows players to trade resources for victory points.

=== Units and Combat ===
Units are purchased by using the Recruit action, and may be used to attack other players with the Attack action (some units may also act as villagers). When attacking, players may attempt to attack another player's Production Area, City Area, or their supplies. Players may only attack opponents seated adjacent to them (thus, players may not attack opponents sharing the same civilization). Before battle, players commit a fixed number of units. In each round of battle, one unit is chosen from both the attacking and defending sides, and a number of dice are rolled for each side based on their relative strengths and advantages against each other (for example, myth units may typically roll more dice compared to mortal units, but less compared to heroes). The player with the fewer "6"s rolled loses their unit. After each round, each player may choose to retreat. The winner of each battle wins any victory points allotted to the "Won the Last Battle" victory point card. If the attacker wins, there is also another effect: if the attack was against a Production Area, the attacker may take a production tile from the defender, while an attack against a City Area allows the attacker to remove a building (two in rare circumstances) from the defender's City Area. An attack against a player's supplies allows the attacker to take resources from the defender's supplies.

=== Resolution ===
The game ends when either the Wonder is built (the Wonder is a special building which requires the player to be in the final Mythic Age before building) or when 30 victory points have been allocated or awarded. At this point the victory points allocated to the "Largest Army", "Most Buildings", and the Wonder are given to their respective players (If there is a tie for Largest Army or Most Buildings, or the game ends without the Wonder being built, the victory points therein are not given to any player. Similarly, any points allocated to "Won the Last Battle" at the end of the game remain unclaimed). The player with the most victory points wins.

== Reception ==
Daniel Sulpizi reviewed Age of Mythology: The Boardgame for The Toronto Star and gave the game 4 stars.

Alessandro Tubani for the Italian publication GAME found the gameplay system simple and straightforward, and that while the gameplay differed from the PC version, that made the board game no less fun.

The game was reviewed the game for CD-Action by an pseudonymous reviewer (Outsider). The reviewer positively commented on the number and quality of the miniatures as well as card illustrations, but criticized the poor quality of cardboard tokens, which were easy to damage during punching out. He was not impressed by the mechanics, elements of which he found either luck-based (wasted turns due to poor card draw) or frustrating (taking an action which mostly aids other players), and both of these aspects culminate in a poor combat mechanic. On the other hand, the reviewer found mechanics related to economy management more enjoyable, as well as the ability to achieve victory through more than one strategy. He concluded that while the game may appeal to the fans of the original video games, most other players will likely find it an average title with poor combat mechanics, awarding the game a score of 6/10.

The Wargamer wrote: "Not only does it capture the essence of the highly regarded computer game, but it is an entertaining, attractive product in its own right; appealing for those who have never played the PC game."
