= Age of Steam =

Age of Steam or Steam Age may refer to:

- A period of industrialization in parts of Europe between roughly 1770 and 1914
- Steam power during the Industrial Revolution
- Steam-powered vessels
- History of the steam engine

== As a proper name ==
- Age of Steam, 1972 album by Gerry Mulligan
- Age of Steam (game), a strategy board game of 2002

== See also ==
- Naval tactics in the Age of Steam
- Steampunk
- Age of Steam Roundhouse
