= Avalanche Press =

American game publisher

- Founded: 1993
- Founder: Mike Bennighof, Brian Knipple
- Headquarters: Irondale, Alabama
- Website: avalanchepress.com

Avalanche Press is an American company that publishes board wargames and has published some role-playing game supplements. The company was founded in 1993 and is headquartered in Irondale, Alabama.

They have produced The Great War at Sea and Panzer Grenadier series, as well as Red Parachutes, one of their earliest games and a detailed study of the Soviet crossing of the Dnepr River in 1943.

== History ==
Avalanche Press was started in 1994 by Mike Bennighof and Brian Knipple. In 1996, Avalanche Press released the first game in the Great War at Sea series. Twice, the series has won the Origins Award for the best historical game of the year.

Avalanche Press was one of the publishers who began producing role-playing game supplements for the d20 System by 2002.

From 2000 to 2005, Avalanche Press produced products using the open-source d20 system. The book Celtic Age won the 2003 Origins Award for Best RPG Supplement.

== Series ==
- Eagles of the Empire series
- The Great War at Sea series—Dreadnought era naval combat
- Infantry Attacks series—World War I tactical combat (a spinoff of Panzer Grenadier)
- Panzer Grenadier series—World War II tactical combat
- Rome at War series—Ancient warfare series (closely related to the Napoleonic Battles series)
- Second World War at Sea series—World War II naval combat (a spinoff of Great War at Sea)
- Third Reich/Great Pacific War series—World War II strategic game

== Games ==
=== 0-9 ===
- 1898: The Spanish–American War (2000)
- 1904–1905: The Russo-Japanese War (1999)
- 1940 - The Fall of France (2009)
- 1967 - Sword of Israel (2013)

=== A ===
- Afrika Korps: The Desert War (2002)
- Airborne (2002)
- Airborne: Introductory Edition (2006)
- Airlines (1998)
- Alaska's War (2007)
- Alsace 1945 (2005)
- America Triumphant: Battle of the Bulge (2003)
- Avalanche: The Invasion of Italy (1994)
- Arctic Convoy (2008)
- An Army at Dawn - Tunisia 1942-1943 (2015)

=== B ===
- Battle of 1866 - Frontier Battles, War of Empires (2012)
- Battle of the Bulge (2002)
- Beyond Normandy (2004)
- Bismark (2005, 2015, 2019)
- Bitter Victory: Sicily 1943 (2006)
- Blood on the Snow (1995)
- Bomb Alley (2002)
- Broken Axis - The Invasion of Romania 1944 (2016)

=== C ===
- Cassino ‘44 - Gateway to Rome (2009)
- Chickamauga & Chattanooga (2003)
- Cone of Fire (2008)
- Conquest of Ethiopia (2018)
- Cruiser Warfare (2004)

=== D ===
- Defiant Russia: 1941 (2004)
- Desert Rats (2004)
- Digging (game) (1999)

=== E ===
- Eastern Fleet (2001)
- Eastern Front (2005)
- Eagles of the Empire - Preussisch-Eylau (1999)
- Eagles of the Empire #1 - Borodino (1994)
- Eagles of the Empire #2 - Friedland

=== F ===
- Fading Legions (2002)
- Fire in the Steppe - Battles in Ukraine 1941 (2018)
- Fire & Sword - Battles For Hungary 1944-1945 (2022)

=== G ===
- Gazala: 1942 (2005)
- Gettysburg 1863 (2002)
- Granada: The Fall of Moslem Spain (2003)
- Great Pacific War (2003)
- Great War at Sea #5: U.S. Navy Plan Black (2000)
- Great War at Sea: The Russo-Japanese War 1904-1905 (1999)
- Great War at Sea: The North and Baltic Seas (1998)
- Great War at Sea: The Mediterranean (1996, 2001)
- Great War at Sea: Jutland - War in the North Sea and Baltic (2007)

=== H ===
- Hannibal at Bay (2000)
- Heroes of the Soviet Union (2001)

=== I ===
- Imperium: Third Millennium (2001)
- Infantry Attacks: Empires End (2007)
- Island of Death: The Invasion of Malta, 1942 (2006)
- Invasion 1944: The Americans in Normandy (2016)

=== J ===
- Jutland (2006)

=== K ===
- Kokoda Campaign (2016)
- Kursk - South Flank (2012)

=== L ===
- Leyte Gulf (2005)
- Long War - Plan Z (2017)
- Liberation 1944 (2014,2016)

=== M ===
- McArthur's Return: Leyte 1944 (1994)
- Midway (2002)

=== N ===
- Napoleon in the Desert (2002)
- Napoleon on the Danube (2005)

=== O ===
- Operation Cannibal (1996)

=== P ===
- Panzer Grenadier (1998)
- Preussisch-Eylau (1999)
- Pacific Crossroads - Japanese-American Naval War Plans 1917-1922 (2010)
- Parachute Over Crete (2019)

=== Q ===
- Queen of the Celts (2007)

=== R ===
- Red God of War (2005)
- Red Parachutes (2005)
- Red Steel: Clash of Armor at Kishinev (1997)
- Red Vengeance (2005)
- Red Warriors (2006)
- Res Publica (1999)
- Road to Berlin (2005)
- Rome at War #1 - Hannibal at Bay (2000)
- Rome at War #2 - Fading Legions (2002)
- Rome at War #3 - Queen of the Celts (2007)
- Red Russia - The Russian Civil War 1918-1921 (2008)

=== S ===
- Scotland the Brave (1998)
- Sea of Troubles (2007)
- Semper Fi! Guadalcanal (2003)
- Sinister Forces (2006)
- Soldier Emperor (2003)
- Soldier Kings (2002)
- Soldier Raj (2004)
- SOPAC (1999)
- Strange Defeat: The Fall of France, 1940 (2006)
- Strike South (2005)
- Survival of the Witless (1997)
- South Pacific (2022)
- Saipan 1944 (2012)

=== T ===
- Tears of the Dragon (2003)
- They Shall Not Pass: The Battle of Verdun, 1916 (2006)
- Third Reich (2001)
- Tiger of Malaya (2006)
- Tropic of Capricorn (2018)

=== U ===
- U.S. Navy Plan Black (1999)
- U.S. Navy Plan Crimson (2008)
- U.S. Navy Plan Gold (2006)
- U.S. Navy Plan Orange (1998)
- U.S. Navy Plan Red (2002)

=== W ===
- Winter Fury (2001)

== Supplements ==
- All For One, One For All
- Arctic Front (2002)
- Aztecs: Empire of the Dying Sun
- Celtic Age
- Distant Oceans (2003)
- Doom of Odin
- Dreadnoughts (2004)
- East of Suez
- Edelweiss (2003)
- Endless Sands
- Great White Fleet
- Greenland Saga
- I, Mordred
- Jungle Fighting (2004)
- Little People
- Nile Empire
- Noble Knights
- Noble Steeds
- Player's Guide: Third Reich/Great Pacific War (2004)
- Ragnarok!
- Tank Battles (2003)
- Twilight of Atlantis
- Viking Age
- Vlad, the Impaler
- Zeppelins (2006)

== d20 System supplements ==
- The Last Days of Constantinople (2001)
