= Railroad Tycoon (disambiguation) =

Railroad Tycoon is a computer game series.

Railroad Tycoon may also refer to:

- Railroad Tycoon (video game)
- Railroad Tycoon (board game)

== See also ==
- Business magnate, for people referred to as "railroad tycoon"
