= Defenders of the Realm =

Defenders of the Realm is a 2010 board game published by Eagle Games.

== Gameplay ==
Defenders of the Realm is a game in which 1–4 heroes unite to battle encroaching Orcs, Dragons, Undead, and Demons on all sides, racing cooperatively to cleanse the land and stop any faction from reaching Monarch City before darkness overwhelms the kingdom.

== Reviews ==
- Black Gate
- Black Gate
- Rebel Times #39
