= London (board game) =

- Designers: Martin Wallace
- Illustrators: Mike Atkinson; Peter Dennis; Simon Jannerland
- Publishers: Treefrog Games; Mayfair Games
- Publication: 2010
- Players: 2–4
- Setup time: approx. 5 minutes
- Playing time: 90 minutes
- Age range: 13 years and up
- Skills: Hand management Card drafting
- Website: Treefrog Games

London is a board game by Martin Wallace. Released in 2010, the game requires players to rebuild London after the Great Fire of London up until the start of the 20th century. London is a card-driven game with a board in the form of a map of London. It won a Meeples Choice award in 2010 and was nominated for an International Gamers Award in 2011.

To rebuild London players purchase boroughs on the board and play cards from their deck. The cards represent buildings of economic, political, scientific, and cultural significance throughout the history of the city. This includes general constructions such as bridges, coffee houses, and hospitals, along with famous landmarks such as Woolwich Arsenal, and Tower Bridge. Players must choose which buildings they wish to construct based on the benefits that each card will give them. The management of poverty is central to the game and players can lose a significant number of victory points if they have accrued more poverty points than their opponents.

Like other games by Martin Wallace, London is considered to involve a strong economic system that players must manage carefully. After buildings have been constructed they may be activated. Many of the cards earn income for the player and this is the primary source of money in the game. Money is used to buy boroughs, construct buildings, and in some cases activate the cards in play. Players may take loans out but receive a significant penalty if they cannot pay it back at the end of the game.

Reviews of the game state that its "deep strategy" makes it a good game for "smaller groups of serious gamers". The game mechanics were praised for being thematically relevant in the historical setting. A criticism of the game is the general lack of interaction between players throughout most of the game.
