= Second World War at Sea series =

Tactical wargame series

Second World War at Sea is a operational and tactical wargame series produced by Avalanche Press covering naval combat during World War II. The series is based on Avalanche Press' Great War at Sea. The two series share many features although they are separate both from a rules standpoint and a scale standpoint (see SOPAC below). Carriers dominate surface combatants in the Pacific games though the system covers the latter in slightly more detail.

== Game Mechanics ==
The SWWAS series simulates World War II naval combat using a dual operational/tactical system with the following characteristics:

- Each major surface unit (Aircraft carriers, battleships, cruisers and fleet destroyers) are represented with a single 1"/.5" rectangular counter containing the ship's statistics (below).
- Minor surface warships (escorts) as well as auxiliaries and merchant ships, are portrayed via 1/2" square counters with the associated statistics.
- Aircraft squadrons (representing from 8–24 aircraft), as well as the game's various status markers, are also 1/2" square counters.

The game provides highly abstracted statistics on the various counters for the following: For ships:

- Surface gunnery factors, divided into "Primary" (Battleship-caliber guns of 12–18" bore, penetrate heavy armour), "Secondary" (cruiser guns from 5"-10" bore, penetrate light armour) and "Tertiary" (minor guns from 3"–5" caliber) ratings.
- Hull, when its all gone you sink.
- Armour for each weapon and hull factor (heavy 10" thick, light 2.5")
- Torpedoes or mines
- Anti-aircraft factors
- Speed
- Fuel

For air units:

- Air-to-air combat factors
- Air-to-surface combat factors
- Land-bombardment factors
- Range and turns of endurance
- Operating altitude

Each game is played on an operational map divided into a grid of squares, each representing a 36-mile-wide area. Unit counters do not move directly on the operational map, but rather are represented by fleet markers. Players plot their unit's moves, and track damage and fuel consumption, on separate data sheets for their associated fleets. Each provided operational scenario will task each player with specific objectives - run a convoy to a port, prevent that convoy passing, bring the opposing fleet to battle, and so on. When two opposing fleets come into contact on the operational map, combat switches to the tactical map.

The tactical map is a grid of hexagons on which individual warship counters can manoeuvre. When units come within range of each other, their gunnery and other factors are translated into numbers of dice rolled to attempt to hit enemy targets. These die rolls are subject to various modifiers for environmental, technical and other factors. Hits, especially those which penetrate armour, will gradually erode the ability of a ship to fight, and ultimately can sink it. Once play on the tactical map terminates it resumes on the operational map until the next time two fleets come into contact.

== Titles In series ==
=== SOPAC ===
SOPAC was the first Second World War at Sea game and extended the Great War at Sea series to World War II. SOPAC was released in 2000 and eventually sold out in 2004. The game had 350 counters, 1 operational map and 20+ scenarios.

SOPAC's scale was different from that of the Great War at Sea series because the area on the map could not fit using the earlier scale on the available map size. This means that the two related series' can not use each other's maps.

=== Eastern Fleet ===
Eastern Fleet was the second game in the series and covered the British Eastern Fleet's operations in the Indian Ocean. The game has 210 counters, 1 operational map and 10 scenarios.

=== Midway ===
Midway covers the Battle of Midway as well as other scenarios in that area and period of the war. The game has 490 counters, 1 operational map and 11 scenarios.

=== Bomb Alley ===
Bomb Alley was the fourth game and according to Avalanche Press, "the most ambitious" (although that title would only last until Leyte Gulf was released). It covered the entire naval campaign in the Mediterranean including the Malta convoys. The game had 840 counters, 2 operational maps and 50 scenarios. The game is out of print, but Avalanche state a replacement is planned.

=== Leyte Gulf ===
Leyte Gulf was the first game produced through Avalanche Press's Classic Wargames program. The game had 2,170 counters, 3 operational maps and 22 scenarios. Leyte Gulf was Avalanche Press's largest and most expensive game and is now out of print.

=== Strike South ===
Strike South covers Japanese operations in 1941 and early 1942, including the invasions of Malaya, the Philippines, and the Dutch East Indies (Indonesia). The game has 420 counters, 2 operational maps and 15 scenarios.

=== Bismarck ===
Bismarck is the first game in this series set in the Atlantic Ocean and covers the operations of German commerce raiders from 1939 to 1941. The game includes the German battleships Bismarck, Tirpitz, Scharnhorst, and Gneisenau as well as the aircraft carriers Graf Zeppelin (as well as her never-completed sister Peter Strasser). The game has 490 counters, 2 operational maps and 12 scenarios.

=== Cone of Fire ===
Cone of Fire contains both Great War at Sea and Second World War at Sea pieces for South American nations. The game had 490 counters, 6 operational maps and 42 scenarios (21 for each game system). It was produced under the Classic Wargames program released in mid-2007 and is now out of print.

=== Arctic Convoy ===
Arctic Convoy covers the Arctic Convoy operations as Allied, primarily British, convoys tried to fight their way to northern Soviet ports against German opposition. The game has 550 counters, 2 operational maps and 24 scenarios.

=== Coral Sea ===
Coral Sea is the introductory game for the Second World War at Sea series and covers the Battle of the Coral Sea. It uses a small box size and comes with a new edition of the series rules and shares a sheet of counters with Pacific Crossroads. The game has 145 counters, 1 operational map and 4 scenarios.

=== Horn of Africa ===
Horn of Africa covers operations in the area of the Horn of Africa and Red Sea between the Royal Navy and Italian Regia Marina. It comes with 100 counters, one operational map and 25 scenarios.

=== Sea of Iron ===
Sea of Iron covers operations in the Baltic in World War II, covering the German, Russian, Swedish and Polish fleets. It comes with 560 counters, one operational map and 30 scenarios

== Supplements ==
Like Great War at Sea, Second World War at Sea has spawned several supplements.

=== Distant Oceans ===
Now out of print, Distant Oceans added scenarios to the existing games at the time it was printed as well as featuring several background articles. It featured counter graphics that gamers could use to create counters for the Yugoslav navy, however, newer supplements feature actual counters. Because of this, Distant Oceans will not be reprinted.

=== East of Suez ===
East of Suez was released in early 2007 and featured the British Pacific fleet in both real and fictional operations in 1944 and 1945. Leyte Gulf is required to play all of the scenarios and other games in the series are needed for some of the scenarios. The supplement is no longer available.

=== Black Sea Fleets ===
Black Sea Fleets adds Soviet naval forces to the game, concentrating on the Black Sea. The supplement also contains counters for the Turkish and Romanian fleets and air units.

=== Strait of Magellan ===
Strait of Magellan was a scenario-only supplement featuring 10 scenarios introducing the major powers onto the Cone of Fire maps. It is no longer available.

=== Combined Fleet ===
Combined Fleet was a scenario-only supplement featuring additional scenarios for Coral Sea and Midway. It is no longer available.

=== Imperial and Royal Navy ===
Imperial and Royal Navy was one of a series of alternate history products originally offered by download, with counters to be printed and produced at home, a printed version was briefly offered. The assumption was that Austro-Hungary had survived World War I and had upgraded the KuK fleet for operations in World War II. The supplement had 210 counters and is no longer available, having been replaced by The Habsburg Fleet.

=== The Tsar's Navy ===
The Tsar's Navy was one of a series of alternate history products originally offered by download, with counters to be printed and produced at home. The assumption was that the Revolution had failed, Russia had seized control of the Bosphorus and the Imperial Russian Black Sea Fleet had received greater emphasis than the Soviet Black Sea Fleet did historically. The supplement had 210 counters and 10 scenarios and is no longer available.

=== Spice Islands ===
Spice Islands was one of a series of alternate history products originally offered by download, with counters to be printed and produced at home. The assumption was that the Dutch fleet had been greatly expanded to provide security for the Dutch East Indies. The supplement had 210 counters and 10 scenarios and is no longer available.

=== The Kaiser's Fleet ===
The Kaiser's Fleet was the first supplement based on an alternate history Avalanche call the Second Great War, with World War I assumed to have been brought to a halt in 1916 by US President Woodrow Wilson's peace proposals. This leaves Imperial Germany in existence, along with the Imperial German Fleet, and its patron Kaiser Wilhelm. The Imperial fleet's development is extrapolated to 1940 at which point the Second Great War breaks out between the Central Powers and the Entente, with the Entente reinforced by Poland and later Holland. The supplement had 210 counters and 25 scenarios covering operations in the Atlantic between the Imperial Germans, France and later Britain.

=== The Habsburg Fleet ===
Effectively a second edition of 'Imperial and Royal Navy', this abandoned the prior supplement's background for that of the Second Great War, with the development of the Austro-Hungarian KuK Fleet handled in a similar fashion to that of the Imperial German fleet in The Kaiser's Fleet. The supplement has 285 counters, expanding on Imperial and Royal Fleet with a further sheet of counters covering British, French, Italian and Turkish, and additional Austro-Hungarian vessels and aircraft. There are 30 scenarios covering operations in the Mediterranean.

=== Royal Netherlands Navy ===
Effectively a second edition of Spice Islands, this abandoned the prior supplement's background for that of the Second Great War, with the development of the Dutch navy handled in a similar fashion to that of the Austro-Hungarian and Imperial German fleets. The supplement has 300 counters, expanding on Spice Islands with a further sheet of counters covering French, British, German and Japanese vessels and aircraft. There are 30 scenarios covering operations in the South China Sea and Dutch East Indies.

=== South American Navies ===
A promotional supplement restricted to Avalanche's 'Gold Club' discount scheme, South American Navies was available for order for a restricted period over Christmas 2015 and early 2016. The supplement expands the Argentinian, Brazilian and Chilean fleets from Cone of Fire to fit into the Second Great War background. It has 90 counters and 10 scenarios and Avalanche have stated it will not be available after initial orders have been fulfilled.

== Future Products ==
A boxed game entitled Plan Z is set for 2016 launch. This will cover the greatly expanded German fleet which was to be built under the eponymous plan. In early 2016 this was expected to contain 630 counters and 30 scenarios/

Future products in the Second World War at Sea series are expected to include a new version of U.S. Navy Plan Orange. Replacements for SOPAC - South Pacific, Bomb Alley - La Regia Marina, and Midway - Midway Deluxe, have been announced for projected availability in late 2016.
