= Survival of the Witless =

1997 card game

Survival of the Witless is a card game produced by Avalanche Press about tenure. Released in 1997, the game was created due to Avalanche Press founder Mike Bennighof's anger at being fired from his teaching job at the University of Alabama at Birmingham (UAB) for winning a teaching award as an untenured professor.

Survival of the Witless was Avalanche Press' hottest-selling game, but as of 2007, it is out of print.

== Reviews ==
- Pyramid #28 (Nov./Dec., 1997)
