= The Last Days of Constantinople =

The Last Days of Constantinople is a 2001 role-playing game adventure published by Avalanche Press.

== Plot summary ==
The Last Days of Constantinople is an adventure in which 1st–3rd level player characters become involved in the 1453 fall of Constantinople, sending them on a perilous quest involving a missing empress, the last Roman emperor, Vlad the Impaler, exotic allies and enemies, and devastating new weapons as the city's walls crumble under the Ottoman assault.

== Reviews ==
- Pyramid
- Polyhedron #146
