= Discworld: Ankh-Morpork =

Board game

- Designers: Martin Wallace
- Illustrators: Peter Dennis; Paul Kidby; Ian Mitchell; Bernard Pearson
- Publishers: Treefrog Games (UK); Mayfair Games (U.S.)
- Publication: 2011
- Players: 2–4
- Setup time: around 5 minutes
- Playing time: 60 minutes
- Skills: Hand management; Area control; Dice rolling
- Ages: 11 years and up
- Website: Treefrog Games

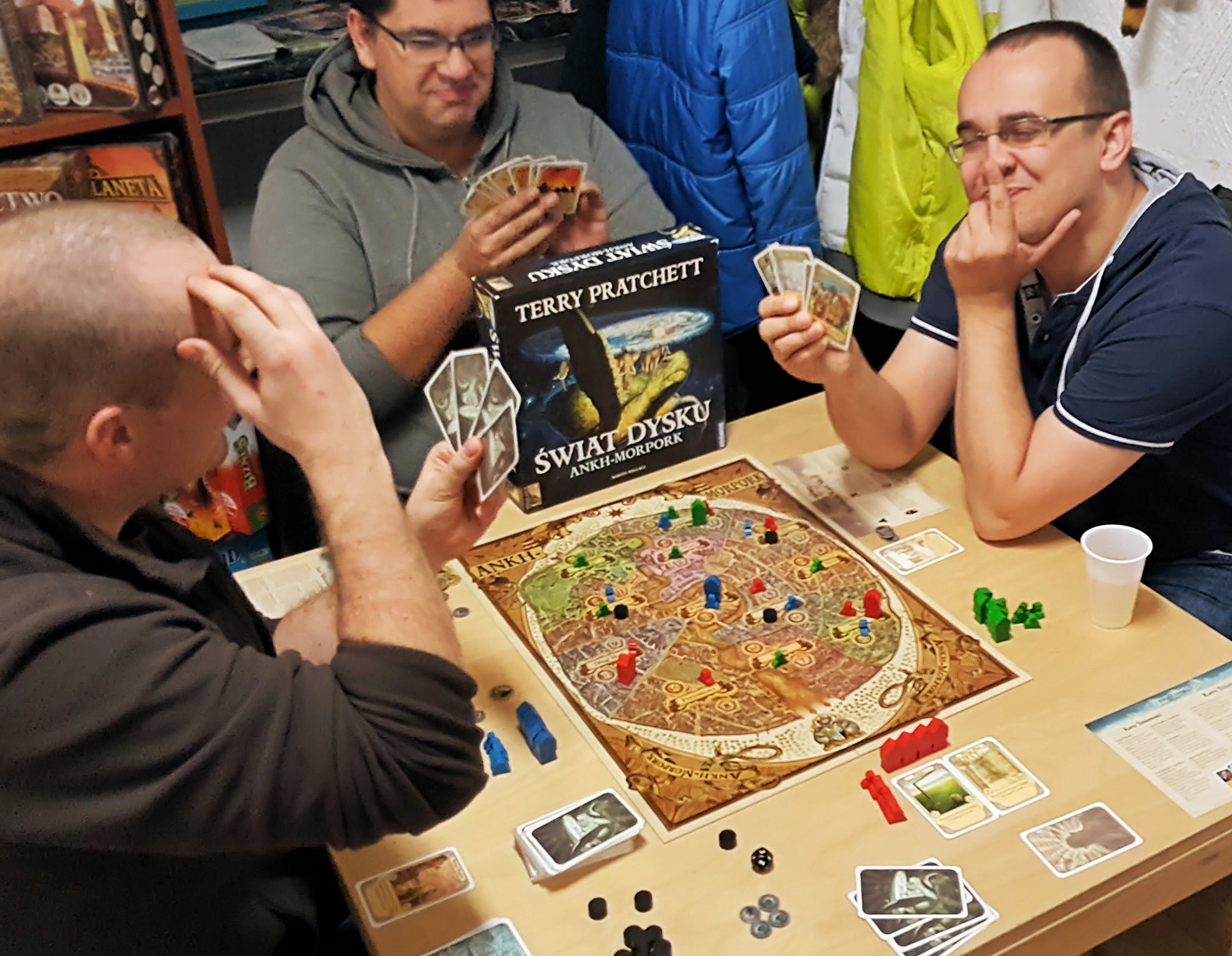
People playing the game

Discworld: Ankh Morpork is a board game set in the largest city-state in Terry Pratchett's Discworld. Designed by Martin Wallace and Treefrog Games, the game revolves around the playing of cards and placing minions onto the board. Each player attempts to meet the win condition for the personality that they randomly and secretly selected at the start of the game. The game features many characters from the Discworld series, but players do not need to have any knowledge about the books.

== Premise ==
The game is based in Terry Pratchett's Discworld universe and features a large number of characters from his novels. The premise of the game is that the patrician of Ankh-Morpork, Lord Vetinari, has disappeared leaving an opening for somebody to come and take control of the city. Players each take on the role of one of seven different Discworld characters and try to meet their individual goal to win the game.

== Gameplay ==
=== Board and cards ===
The game takes place on a map of Ankh-Morpork, with players trying to place minions and buildings through card play. The board is divided up into twelve areas and much of the gameplay involves taking control of these locations by having more of your minions/buildings there than any other player. There are 101 cards that players draw from during the game. Each one is unique and features a character, organisation, or location from the Discworld books.

Discworld: Ankh-Morpork is driven by the playing of game cards, with each player taking it in turns to play one of their cards. Each card features zero or more symbols that allow them to perform actions such as place one of their minions on the board, murder an opponent's minion, and collect money.

The game also involves money which is primarily used to buy buildings in one of the twelve areas of the board. Owning an area gives the player additional capabilities in their turn including the ability to place additional minions and collecting more money.

=== Personalities and win conditions ===
At the start of the game each player draws a secret personality card with specific victory conditions. This gives Discworld: Ankh-Morpork a mystery-solving aspect similar to party games such as Mafia. Most of the goals refer to the number of minions on the board, the amount of trouble markers in play, or the attainment of a certain amount of money. The game ends if a player has met the win condition of their personality at the beginning of their turn, or if the deck of cards runs out. If the deck is finished the game has a points-based system to determine the winner. However, one personality, Sam Vimes, instantly wins when all the cards have been drawn.

== Editions ==
Treefrog Games has released two editions of Discworld: Ankh-Morpork beyond the standard version. The Collector's Edition comes with wooden coins, a larger board, and a custom twelve-sided die. The Deluxe Edition includes the same but has resin minions, buildings, trolls, and demons.

== Publishing and reception ==
Discworld: Ankh-Morpork was designed by Martin Wallace and Treefrog Games. It is published in North America by Mayfair Games, and Treefrog claims to have sold over 50,000 copies worldwide. Wallace's second Discworld-themed board game, The Witches, was released in September 2013. The artwork, by Peter Dennis, Ian Mitchell, Paul Kidby, and Bernard Pearson, was checked by Terry Pratchett and the Discworld Emporium to ensure that each character was faithfully represented.

The game was well received, winning the 2011 UK Games Expo Best New Boardgame. It has been described as an "absolute joy to play" and praised for being engaging for fans of Pratchett's Discworld and those who have no knowledge of the books. The artwork also impressed with the cards being described as "hilarious and beautifully illustrated".

On 9 June 2015, Wallace announced that the licence to produce Discworld games had been lost due to changes in the licensing scheme following Sir Terry Pratchett's death, meaning that Ankh-Morpork and The Witches were out of print permanently. He added that there was no chance that the licence would ever be renewed, or that the planned third Discworld game would be produced. The game has been released with a new Victorian/Holmsian theme as Nanty Narking.
