= Twilight of Atlantis =

Role-playing game supplement

Twilight of Atlantis is a 2001 role-playing game supplement for the d20 System published by Avalanche Press.

== Contents ==
Twilight of Atlantis is a supplement in which a mythic, high‑magic empire on the brink of collapse is presented, offering new races, prestige classes, feats, and a resonance‑based spellcasting system inspired by Plato's Atlantis for players seeking to save—or topple—the doomed realm.

== Reviews ==
- Pyramid
- Asgard #5 (March, 2002)
