= Martin Wallace (game designer) =

English board game designer

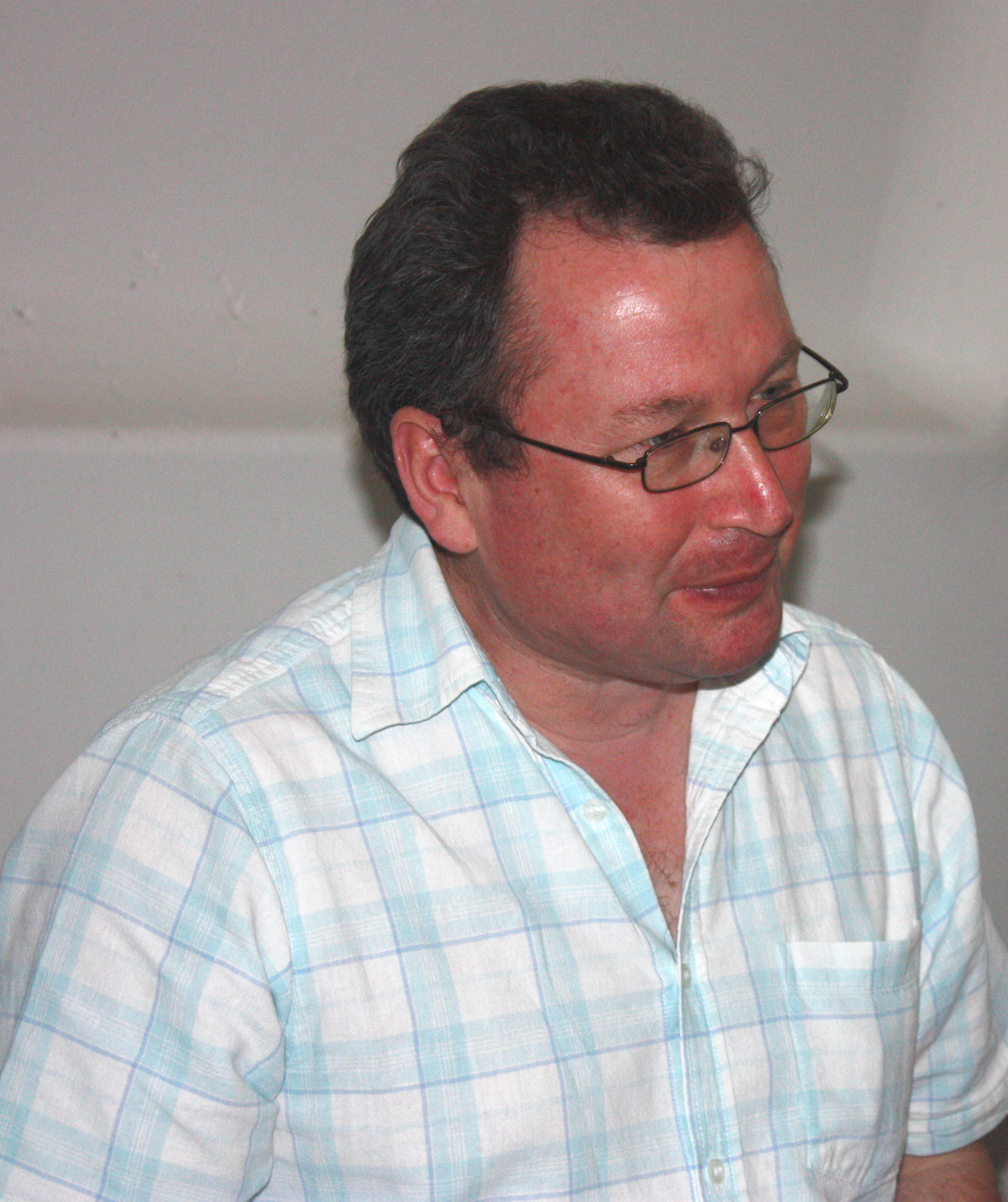
- Wallace in 2012
- Born: United Kingdom
- Occupation: Game designer

Martin Wallace is an English board game designer from Manchester.

== Early life and education ==
Martin Wallace was born and raised in the U.K., and has been resident in Manchester for most of those years. He began gaming in his teens, starting with titles from SPI and Avalon Hill, and as a student he got into Dungeons & Dragons.

== Career ==
Wallace worked for a while at Games Workshop, then started designing games in earnest in the early 1990s, his first DTP game being Lords of Creation. Eventually German companies picked up a few of his games, such as Und Tschüss, Volldampf, and Tempus. He has also published a number of games through his own company, Warfrog. These include such titles as Struggle of Empires and Princes of the Renaissance.

Wallace is the founder and chief designer of Treefrog (former Warfrog) Games. Wallace is known for designing complex strategy games that depict a variety of historical settings. Two themes he has frequently used are the construction and operation of railroads, and the rise and fall of ancient civilizations. He has developed a reputation for blending elegant European style game mechanics with the strong themes that are more typical of American style games. Many of his games feature economic systems, incorporating rules for income, taxation, and debt. In 2016, Wallace announced the closure of Treefrog Games and focussing on being a full-time game designer.

== Notable games ==
- Empires of the Ancient World (2000)
- Liberté (2001)
- Volldampf (2001)
- Tyros (2002)
- Age of Steam (2002)
- Princes of the Renaissance (2003)
- Secrets of the Tombs (2003)
- Runebound (2004)
- Struggle of Empires (2004)
- Byzantium (2005)
- Railroad Tycoon (2005)
- Tempus (2006)
- Perikles (2006)
- Brass (2007)
- Tinners' Trail (2008)
- After The Flood (2008)
- Steel Driver (2008)
- Steam: Rails to Riches (2009)
- Waterloo (2009)
- Automobile (2009)
- Rise of Empires (2009)
- Last Train to Wensleydale (2009)
- God's Playground (2009)
- Moongha Invaders (2010)
- Age of Industry (2010)
- London (2010)
- First Train to Nuremberg (2010)
- Gettysburg (2010)
- A Few Acres of Snow (2011)
- Age of Industry #1: Japan and Minnesota (2011)
- Discworld: Ankh-Morpork (2011)
- Aeroplanes: Aviation Ascendant (2012)
- Doctor Who: The Card Game (2012)
- Discworld: The Witches (2013)
- A Study in Emerald (2013) based on Neil Gaiman’s short story A Study in Emerald
- Onwards to Venus (2014) based on Greg Broadmore’s Dr Grordbort
- Mythotopia (2014)
- Ships (2015)
- A Study in Emerald Second Edition (2015)
- Brass: 2-Player Board (2015)
- Via Nebula (2016)
- Hit Z Road (2016)
- A Handful of Stars (2017)
- AuZtralia (2018)
- Brass: Birmingham (2018)
- Brass: Lancashire (2018) based on his original Brass (2007)
- Judge Dredd Helter Skelter (2019)
- Milito (2019)
- Nanty Narking (2019)
- Anno 1800 (2020)
- Tinners' Trail (2021) (new, reworked edition)
- Rocketmen (2021)
- Bloodstones (2023)
