= Stonehenge (game) =

Anthology board game

- Designers: Various (see article)
- Publishers: Spielzeit Edge Entertainment Paizo Publishing
- Players: 2–5
- Setup time: 5 minutes
- Playing time: 45–60 minutes
- Chance: High
- Age range: 10+
- Skills: Bidding

Stonehenge is the first anthology board game. It was released in June 2007 by Paizo Publishing under their Titanic Games imprint. Five game designers, Richard Garfield, Richard Borg, James Ernest, Bruno Faidutti, and Mike Selinker, were given the same set of game materials and each created their own game using those components.

The five games are: a magic game by Richard Garfield, a political game by Bruno Faidutti, a battle game by Richard Borg, an auction game by James Ernest, and a science-fiction game by Mike Selinker.

An expansion, titled Stonehenge: Nocturne, was released later in 2007 with developers Andrew Looney, Klaus-Jürgen Wrede, Serge Laget, and Bruno Cathala adding their games to the anthology.
