= College Football Risk =

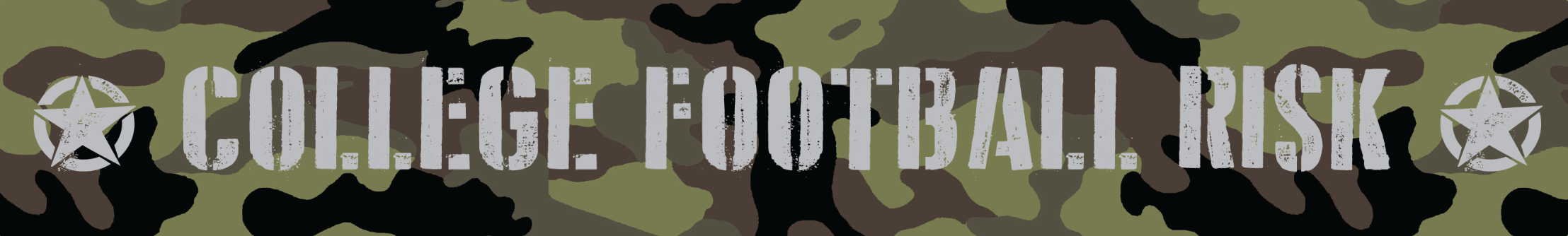
- Other names: CFBRisk
- Years active: 2018–2020
- Genres: MMOG; Strategy game War game
- Players: ~8,000
- Playing time: 50 Days
- Chance: Online Random Number Generator
- Skills: Strategy, Tactics, Diplomacy

College Football Risk, or CFBRisk, was a short-lived collegiate strategy game that took place during the spring and was inspired by the Hasbro Boardgame Risk. Each season, more than 8,000 students and non-students participated, representing all NCAA Division I FBS schools in the United States. The game was a continuation of the popular game run by the college football subreddit, "r/CFB," on the social media site Reddit. CFBRisk first took place in the spring and summer of 2018. It was an MMOG-style game where college football fanbases compete for control of a fictionalized map of the United States. The goal was to control as much territory as possible for ultimate domination of the map. The second season of College Football Risk was played independently from Reddit.

== Gameplay ==
=== Premise ===
The concept of overtaking another team's territory spurred from a series of Reddit posts where users modified maps of the United States to illustrate a team's power, known as college football 'imperialism maps' or 'empires maps.' These were not based on the board game Risk, but the outcomes of college football games throughout the season. Fanbases and news sites later pointed out the similarities to the Risk, and a game where fanbases themselves controlled the outcome (independently of their teams actual performance) was developed in the college football offseason. CFBRisk was played on a map of 131 territories in the United States, 130 of which represent the geographical home of NCAA Division I FBS schools and one additional territory designated for team Chaos. Initially, home territories were determined by which school is closest in straight-line distance to the geometric center of each county, but were later adjusted to reduce the overlap in state boundaries. The goal of the game was to expand your home team's territory and ultimately control the entire game map.

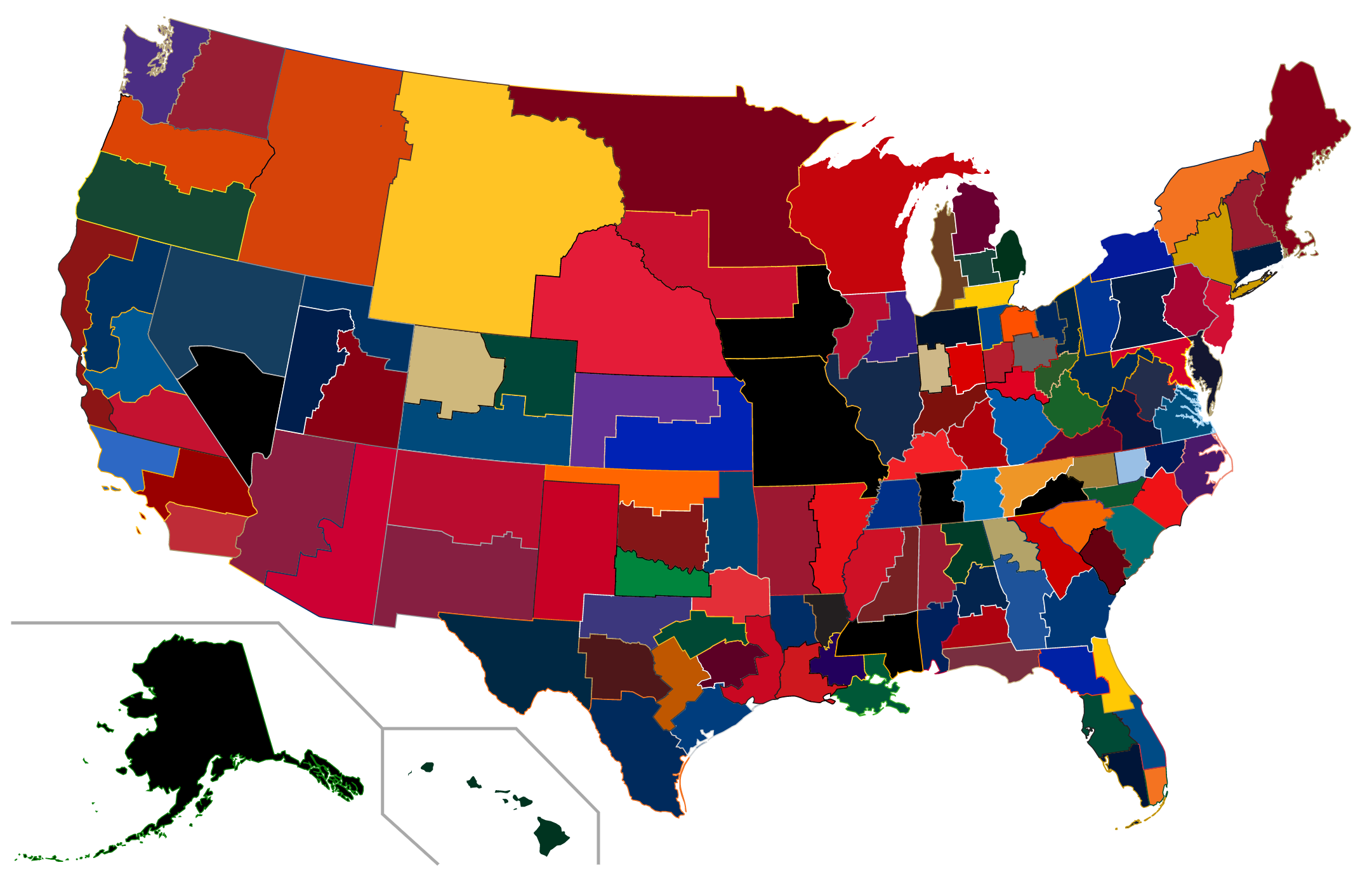
The CFBRisk Map on Day One

Players affiliated with a school and had the option to make a single move every day. Players either defended one of their own territories or attacked an adjacent territory held by an enemy team. Every night at 11PM EST, the results of each team's attack and defense are calculated for every territory, and the map updated based on which teams win each territory. Every team was assigned a point value based on the total number players from that team who attacked or defended a given territory and a random number generator (RNG) determined the victor. The odds of winning a given territory was found through the ratio of total points of each of the attacking teams and the defending team. A random player from the winning team of a territory was selected every round and designated as the MVP.

=== Star Power ===
Players gained power, known as Star Power by completing milestones within the game that fell into five categories. A player's total star power was the median number of stars over all categories. For instance, a player with star powers of 1-2-2-2-3 had a median value of 2. The star power a player had represented a player's power multiplier when attacking or defending. When attacking, a player's power points were designated to be 1 for a one-star, 2 for a two-star, 6 for a three-star, 12 for a four-star, and 24 for a five-star. When defending, a player's power was 1.5x their power points.

The five star power categories were:

- Total turns played in CFBRisk:
  - 0 turns: One Star
  - 10 turns: Two Stars
  - 25 turns: Three Stars
  - 50 turns: Four Stars
  - 100 turns: Five Stars
- Total turns played in the current season:
  - 0 turns: One Star
  - 5 turns: Two Stars
  - 10 turns: Three Stars
  - 25 turns: Four Stars
  - 40 turns: Five Stars
- Consecutive turns played:
  - 0 turns: One Star
  - 3 turns: Two Stars
  - 5 turns: Three Stars
  - 10 turns: Four Stars
  - 25 turns: Five Stars
- MVPs obtained:
  - 0 MVPs: One Star
  - 1 MVPs: Two Stars
  - 5 MVPs: Three Stars
  - 10 MVPs: Four Stars
  - 25 MVPs: Five Stars
- CFB Awards obtained:
  - 0 Awards: One Star
  - 1 Awards: Two Stars
  - 2 Awards: Three Stars
  - 3 Awards: Four Stars
  - 4 Awards: Five Stars

=== Winning the Game ===
Although the object was for the entire map to be conquered, no team ever accomplished the feat. Instead, a season end date was announced and the team with the most territories became the winner. The team that has come closest to obtaining complete conquest was the University of Florida, controlling 40 territories, or 31% of the map, in season one, day 63.

=== Team Chaos ===
Team Chaos was an extra team added to the game to allow for players to continue in gameplay after their home team is eliminated. Chaos started in the territory of Alaska, since no Division I FBS teams are located there. When a team was eliminated, players were offered the option of either joining the team that held their home territory or to join Team Chaos. Players could also choose to begin the game with Chaos as their home team. The gameplay mechanics for Chaos differ slightly from a normal team. For instance, players in Chaos are provided no defense bonus, but are provided a random attack bonus, thereby encouraging the team to attack other territories and spread throughout the game. Chaos could not be eliminated; if the last remaining Chaos territory is conquered, the game randomly rolls against every other territory on the map until Chaos wins a territory.

=== Diplomacy ===
A key facet to success in CFBRisk was making and maintaining alliances with other teams. Teams generally designated diplomatic leaders that could meet and confer with other teams to discuss collaborative strategy, attack enemy territories together, and define territorial boundaries.

== Seasons ==
=== Season One - 2018 ===
Season one lasted 66 days. The winner of the season was determined by whichever team secured the most territories at the end of the season. A total of 119 teams were eliminated in season one, leaving only twelve teams remaining by day 66. Season one was the first to allow fanbases to control the map by making strategic moves rather than basing the outcome on the college football season. Territories were also consolidated to include more than one county in a single territory, thus counties were eliminated as a measure of conquest.

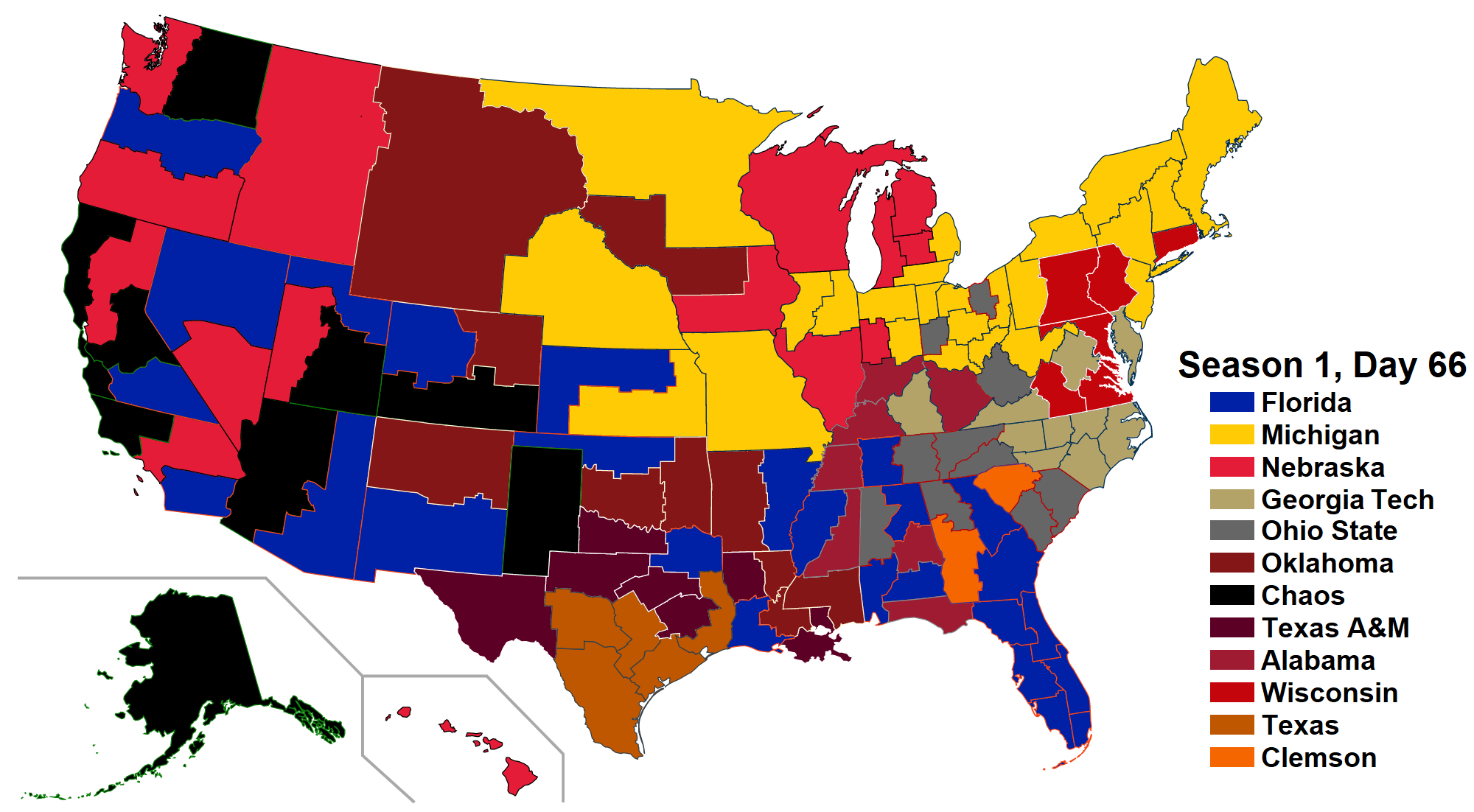
A map of season one, day 66, showing each team's conquered territories.

Final Rank	Team	Territory Count	Player Count	Star Power
1	University of Florida	26	793	5,959
2	University of Michigan	24	1235	4,829
3	University of Nebraska–Lincoln	15	436	3,898
4	Georgia Institute of Technology	10	446	2,199
5	Ohio State University	10	381	3,429
6	University of Oklahoma	10	152	1,601
7	Team Chaos	9	288	2,942
8	Texas A&M University	7	205	1,778
9	University of Alabama	7	195	2,041
10	University of Wisconsin	6	202	1,401

=== Season Two - 2020 ===
Season two was announced to last 50 days and began on March 23, 2020. Only nine out of 131 teams remained at the end of the season. The season winner was decided by the most territories held, making Ohio State University the victor. The team with the largest number of contiguous territories was the Aggies of Texas A&M University, which did not factor into results. The team with the most star power was the University of Michigan.

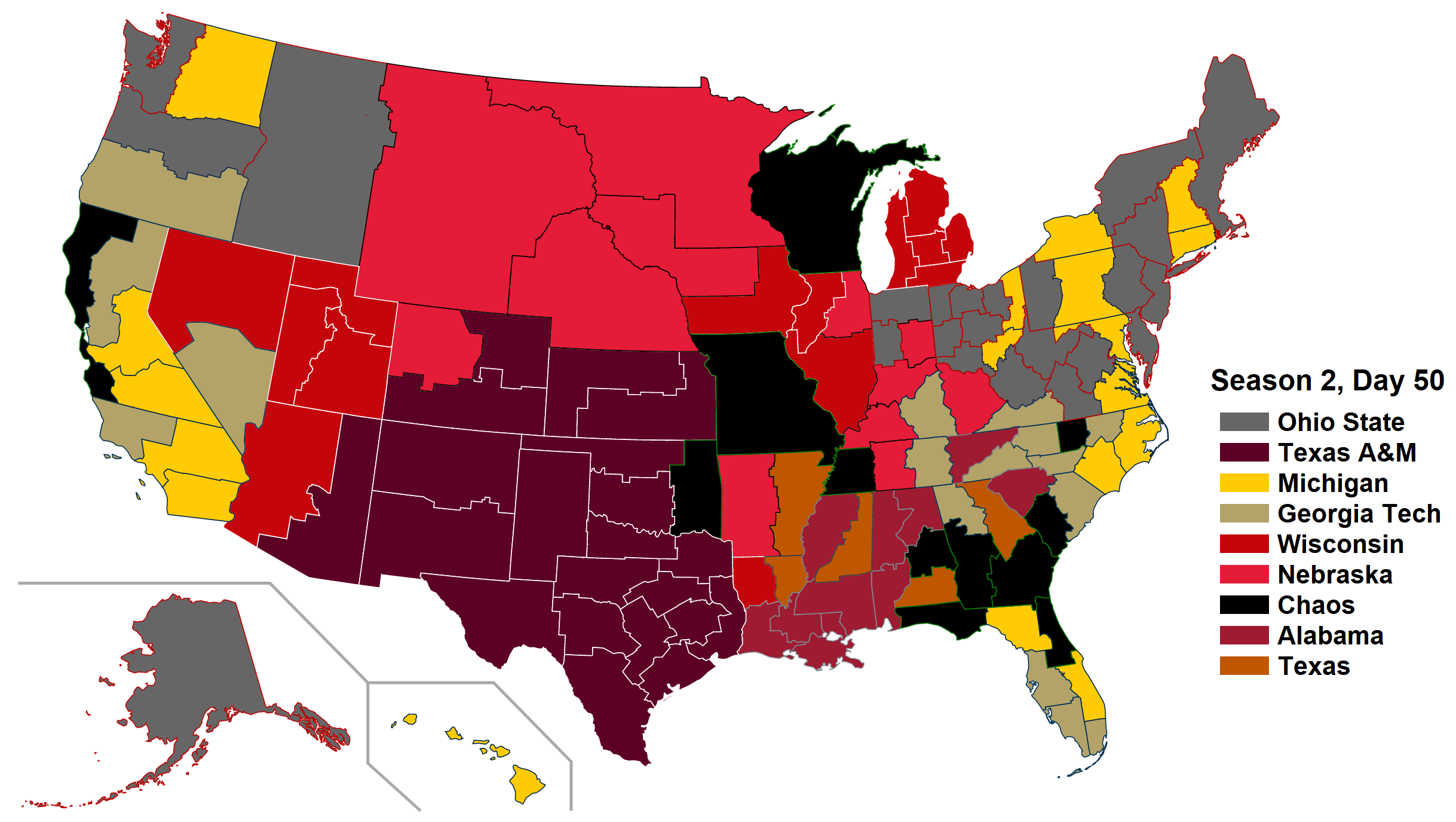
The final map of Season 2, showing each team's territorial expansion

Final Rank	Team	Territory Count	Player Count	Star Power
1	Ohio State University	23	1,749	6,995
2	Texas A&M University	21	775	3,758
3	University of Michigan	18	1,697	8,855
4	Georgia Institute of Technology	16	651	4,246
5	University of Wisconsin	14	471	3,193
6	University of Nebraska–Lincoln	12	362	3,643
7	Team Chaos	12	329	2,885
8	University of Alabama	10	276	2,312
9	University of Texas	5	264	2,430
