= Michael Bennighof =

American game designer

- Occupation: Game designer

Michael Bennighof is a game designer who has worked primarily on board games.

== Early life and education ==
Mike Bennighof is a Fulbright Scholar, and holds a doctorate in history from Emory University. He has played and coached semi-pro football, taught college, worked as a newspaper reporter, and shoveled gravel professionally.

== Career ==
Bennighof has been designing games since the early 1980s, working on over 100 titles as a designer or developer. Bennighof is president of Avalanche Press, Ltd., a publisher of traditional board wargames. He has won Origins Awards both for wargame design (U.S. Navy Plan Orange) and role-playing game design (Celtic Age). He scripted the Panzer General II (for which he also designed the maps) and Destroyer Commander computer games, among others; designed such games as Survival of the Witless, Panzer Grenadier, and Great War at Sea; and was the author of the infamous book, Black Flags. Great War at Sea received awards at the Origins Awards in 1998 and 1999.
