= Catan Dice Game =

Catan Dice Game is a German-style board game, developed by Klaus Teuber and published in 2007 by Catan GmbH and its licensors, Kosmos in Germany and Catan Studio in English-speaking countries. It is a dice game re-imagining of Teuber's most notable title, Settlers of Catan. Catan Dice Game can be played by any number of players, but is ideally suited for up to four. A variation, known as Catan Dice Game Plus, is freely available from the Catan website, whose gameplay is closer to its Settlers origins. A user generated game known as Catan Dice Extra is available with a PDF printable board which more closely resembles the original game with a larger map.

== Gameplay ==
Gameplay is similar to that of Yahtzee, where six specially-marked dice representing resources can be rolled up to three times, with the player being able to choose which dice to keep between rolls. After the player stops rolling, they may invest their resources to build roads, knights, settlements, and cities; each of these having differing resource requirements. Roads must extend from a starting point, which the cities and settlements (which must be built in increasing order of point value) must connect. Knights may be used to unlock "resource jokers", which allow the outcome of one die to be set to a specific resource after the dice have been rolled.

For each road, settlement, knight, or city completed, points are awarded - however points are deducted if a player is unable to build anything on a turn. The player with the most points after 15 turns is declared the winner.

== Reception ==
Rafał Cholewa reviewing this for Rebel Times in 2010 was disappointed with the game, noted that the game is too dependent on luck, is not very attractive, effectively consisting of just six poorly made dice and a sheet of paper. He concluded that the game is hard to recommend, unless one needs a cheap, small game that can be played while travelling.
