= Rome at War series =

Board game series

The Rome at War series is Avalanche Press' Board wargame series covering ancient land combat. The series started in 2000 with the release of Hannibal at Bay.

== Games ==
=== Hannibal at Bay ===
Hannibal at Bay is the first game in the series and was released in 2000. The game covers the Punic Wars between Rome and Carthage. The original version of the game used hard mounted game boards, which increased the selling price of the game. An updated version of Hannibal at Bay was announced on May 13, 2008 and was scheduled to be released in June 2008. This game will use cardstock game boards (like those in the Panzer Grenadier series) to reduce the price of the game. This version game is designed to be an entry point for the series, just like Airborne is for Panzer Grenadier.

=== Fading Legions ===
Fading Legions was released in 2002 and moved the series to the end of the Roman Empire, with battles against the Sassanid Persians and other enemies.

=== Queen of the Celts ===
The series did not receive any updates until 2007, with Queen of the Celts. This game covers both the Roman invasion of Britain and the resistance led by Caratacus, and the revolt of Boudicca against Roman misrule. The game is named after Boudica.

=== King of Kings ===
King of Kings is the first book supplement to Rome at War and was announced on September 15, 2008. It covers the conflicts between the Roman Empire and the northern barbarians, as well as conflicts involving the Sassanid Empire, Palmyra, and Armenia.

=== Future Games ===
Future games in the Rome at War include one on Julius Caesar, and an updated version of Hannibal at Bay.
