= Railways of the World =

2005 board game

- Designers: Martin Wallace; Glenn Drover
- Publishers: Eagle Games
- Players: 2–6
- Setup time: 5 minutes
- Playing time: 120 minutes
- Chance: Low

Railways of the World (originally Railroad Tycoon) is a railway-themed board game designed by Martin Wallace and Glenn Drover and published by Eagle Games. It is a simplified version of Wallace's earlier railway-themed game Age of Steam. The game, first released in 2005, was originally named Railroad Tycoon after the video game series of the same name, featuring box art based on the third entry in the video game series. After the license to use the Railroad Tycoon name expired, the board game has been published under its current Railways of the World title since 2009. It takes place in the eastern United States in 1830. Each player takes charge of a pioneering new railway company.

== Gameplay ==
The hex-based gaming board depicts the eastern United States, and features cities, open terrain, hills and rivers. Players score victory points by delivering goods between cities, using their own railway links as much as possible. In order to do that, players must build railroad tracks between cities, upgrade locomotives and find the best delivery lines to get the right cargo to the right city.

=== Setup ===
At the beginning of the game each city is given a number of goods cubes (determined by its size). Each player draws a Tycoon card, which outlines a task they may fulfill by the end of the game to earn additional Victory Points.

=== Money ===
Players begin the game without money. Whenever a player is short on cash they may issue a share certificate. These give the player a certain amount of money. Once issued by the player these certificates cannot be returned and at the end of each game turn, the player must pay 20% dividends on any shares he holds. Additionally, each share held by the player counts against his final score at the end of the game.

=== Game turns ===
Each game turn is divided into 3 distinct phases:

- Auction to determine the first player - Players take turns to bid for the right to be the first player in the second phase.
- Player actions - Proceeding clockwise from the winning player from the Auction, players take turns performing 1 action of their choice. This process repeats until each player has performed 3 actions.
- Income and dividends - Players collect income based on how many goods cubes they have delivered and pay dividends on any shares they have issued.

=== Player actions ===
During the player action phase, players may perform one of the following actions:

- Build Track - Place track tiles on the game board to connect two cities.
- Urbanize - Invest money in a small city to allow it to receive goods of a specific type.
- Upgrade Engine - Upgrade their fleet of locomotives, allowing goods to be hauled longer distances.
- Deliver Goods Cube - Transport a goods cube from one city to another earning victory points.
- Draw Railroad Operation Card - Draw a card from the face up pile, conveying some sort of benefit.
- Build Western Link - Establish a link between the eastern and western United States, providing access to additional goods cubes.

== End game condition ==
The game ends when a number of cities (determined by the number of players) have no more goods cubes left. The winner is the player with the most victory points. In addition to goods cube delivery, victory points be earned by completing specific tasks detailed by action cards or by completing the task outlined on the players tycoon card.

== Editions ==
After the English version of Railroad Tycoon went out of print, an international version was briefly made available, utilizing less important game elements from other language versions of the game. Since 2009 a newer edition with some small changes was published by Eagle Games under the name "Railways of the World". This new edition is considered to be an improved version of the game, and has effectively rendered the original Railroad Tycoon obsolete. A 10th Anniversary Edition of Railways of the World was produced in 2018.

== Expansions ==
Expansion maps produced for the game include Europe, Great Britain, Canada, and Japan.
