= Coin Hopping—Washington D.C. =

Board game

- Designers: J. F. Cartier
- Publication: 2007
- Age range: 8+
- Media type: board game

Coin Hopping—Washington D.C. is a board game designed by J. F. Cartier it was published in 2007. To play the game each player assumes the role of an interest group and tours Washington, D.C. in an effort to control the three branches of government.

The game board is an illustrated map of Washington, D.C. Movement across the board is controlled by the placement of coins and changes dynamically during the game. This is similar to previous board games developed by the same designer.

Coin Hopping—Washington D.C. is designed for 2-6 players, ages 8 and above. This game is a designer board game, a genre made popular by games such as Settlers of Catan, and is an educational game.

== Recognition ==
Coin Hopping—Washington D.C. has won the awards, iParenting Media and Dr. Toy’s 100 Best Children’s Products for 2008.

== Gameplay ==
Game objectives
There are two objectives in the game. One is to create a stack of four coins. The other is to "control the government" by placing citizens in the Capitol, White House, and Supreme Court.
The first person to have simultaneously a stack of four coins and a citizen in each of the three offices is the winner.
The board
The game board is an illustrated map of Washington D.C. Each space on the board is represented by a Washington D.C. landmark, including the White House, the Capitol and the Supreme Court. Each player brings a penny, a nickel, a dime and a quarter to the game, and these are placed on spaces on the board.
Movement on the board
Players move around the board by "coin hopping". Players can move their pawns to any adjacent space on the board that has a coin on it. A player's turn ends when the player's pawn lands on a space without a coin. Additionally, a player can pick up a coin from one space and carry it with the pawn to another space. This allows the player to move a coin to an empty space or create a stack of coins.
The goal is to create a stack of coins which includes one penny, one nickel, one dime and one quarter. Any player who places the fourth coin on a stack gets to claim that stack and remove it from the board.
Destination cards allow the player to jump to a specific destination on the board and can be used strategically to move quickly across the board.
Placing citizens in office
Each player has five citizens than can be placed into office at the White House, the Capitol or the Supreme Court.
When a player lands on the Capitol, one of the player's citizens may be added to the Congress.
When a player lands on the White House, one of the player's citizens may be made the President. There is only one president at a time, so any previous office holder is sent home.
When a player lands on the Supreme Court, one of the player's citizens may be appointed as a Justice, but only if the player also controls the presidency. This means that the player must get to the Supreme Court before the player's president is removed from office by another player.
Advanced gameplay
In basic gameplay only the President has special powers (i.e. placing a citizen in the Supreme Court), but in advanced game play the powers of the three branches of government are balanced.
When a player places a citizen in the Capitol, a bill affecting gameplay may be sponsored and voted on. If the bill passes, it is made into a law. Any law may be contested by a player with a citizen in the Supreme Court. Additionally, Lobbyists are given a role in affecting the vote in Congress.
