= Song of Blades and Heroes =

- Ganesha Games logo
- Designers: Andrea Sfiligoi
- Publishers: Ganesha Games
- Publication: 2012 (5th ed.)
- Genres: Universal
- Systems: Wargaming
- Setup time: Varies depending on size of game. Usually 5 minutes.
- Playing time: Varies depending on size of game. Usually 30 Minutes to three hours for campaign rules
- Chance: Medium (dice rolling)
- Skills: Military strategy, arithmetic
- Website: www.ganeshagames.net

Song of Blades and Heroes 4th edition Cover

Song of Blades and Heroes is a tabletop miniatures game set of fast play fantasy rules that can be played with generic fantasy figures or model soldiers called "miniatures". The game uses three measuring sticks (called Short, Medium, and Long) to measure all distances. An average game lasts 30–45 minutes. A small campaign, a series of linked games played using the same miniatures, can be played in a single evening.

== Background ==
The Song of Blades and Heroes core rules (currently Revised Fifth Edition 2012) was originally written and illustrated by Andrea Sfiligoi of Ganesha Games in 2007.

== Gameplay ==
Song of Blades and Heroes uses three six-sided dice, (also known as D6 dice) per player to determine the outcome of a character's actions. Each character profile has three basic statistics; Points, Quality, Combat and Special Abilities. Points refer to how many points it costs to use the character within the game. Quality is used to activate characters, i.e. to determine how many actions they can perform each turn. Combat is the number you add to a six-sided dice roll when performing a Melee or Ranged attack. Special Abilities cover any Special Abilities that the character may have. Players take alternate turns in activating models from their warbands. The miniatures are activated one at a time. The player can then choose to roll one, two or three dice versus the miniature’s Quality. A successful roll entitles the player to make an action, such as an attack or a move. If two or more failures are rolled, play will then pass to the opponent. This mechanic creates turns of variable length and encourages the player to form a plan in his mind before deciding how many dice to roll.

Melee combat is simultaneous and determined by opposed D6 rolls, modified by the character's Combat value and situational modifiers such as outnumbering or a surprise bonus (called ambush bonus in the rules). Beating an opponent means that he must recoil one base away or fall down; doubling an opponent's score (e.g., an 8 to 4)means that the opponent is killed; and tripling the opponent's score (e.g., a 9 to 3) means that he is gruesomely killed and all friends witnessing his death must make a morale roll.

== Expansions and Add-on Supplements ==
There are stand-alone books where the core rules are repeated and one does not need to buy the core Song of Blades and Heroes Rule book to play.

Osprey Publishing have released "Of Gods and Mortals" (published October 2013) and "A Fistful of Kung Fu" (February 2013) which are written by Andrea Sfiligoi, and are based on the Song of Blades and Heroes engine.

Books produced by third parties that use the Song of Blades and Heroes engine include; Shadowsea, Deepwars and their supplements, Song of Our Ancestors and Firebrand. These are all stand-alone versions of the SBH rules with a specific world/background included in the book, but the core rules are highly compatible with SBH.

The following table lists expansions and supplements that have been developed for the Song of Blades and Heroes rules, and other stand-alone titles based on the same engine.

Code	Name	Type
SGD	Song of Gold and Darkness	SBH dungeon supplement
SDG	Song of Deeds and Glory	SBH extended campaign rules
SWW	Song of Wind and Water	SBH wilderness supplement
SAM	Song of Arthur and Merlin	SBH Arthurian variant, stand-alone book
SSL	Song of the Splintered Lands	SBH variant, models by Splintered Light Miniatures, stand-alone book
SFB	Song of Fur and Buttons	SBH variant, models by Eureka Miniatures, stand-alone book
SDS	Song of Drums and Shakos	Napoleonic skirmish rules, stand-alone book
MDS	More Drums and Shakos	supplement for Song of Drums and Shakos
FL	Flying Lead	modern skirmish rules, stand-alone book
HM	Hearts and Minds	Afghanistan campaign supplement for Flying Lead
TBH	Tales of Blades and Heroes	fantasy RPG rules based on SBH
TBP	Tales of Beasts and Perils	GM's book for TBH
MDRG	Mutants and Death Ray Guns	post-holocaust skirmish rules, stand-alone book
FS	Flashing Steel	Swashbuckling skirmish rules, stand-alone book
6165	'61-'65	Company-level American Civil War skirmish, stand-alone book
SSD	Song of Shadows and Dust	SBH variant for urban skirmishes in the ancient world, stand-alone book
FF	Fear and Faith	Horror Skirmish rules, stand-alone book
FF	Ghost Rangers	ghost-hunting campaign rules for Fear and Faith

== Awards ==
In 2008, Song of Blades and Heroes was nominated for the Origins Award as “Best Miniature Rules”.

The expansion Song of Drums and Shakos received 3 awards in 2009;

- WINNER: Best Historical Miniatures Rules at the Origins Award 2009
- WINNER, Silver Medal at HISTORICON 2009
- WINNER: Best Demo at HELLANA 2009
