= It's Alive! (card game) =

Card game

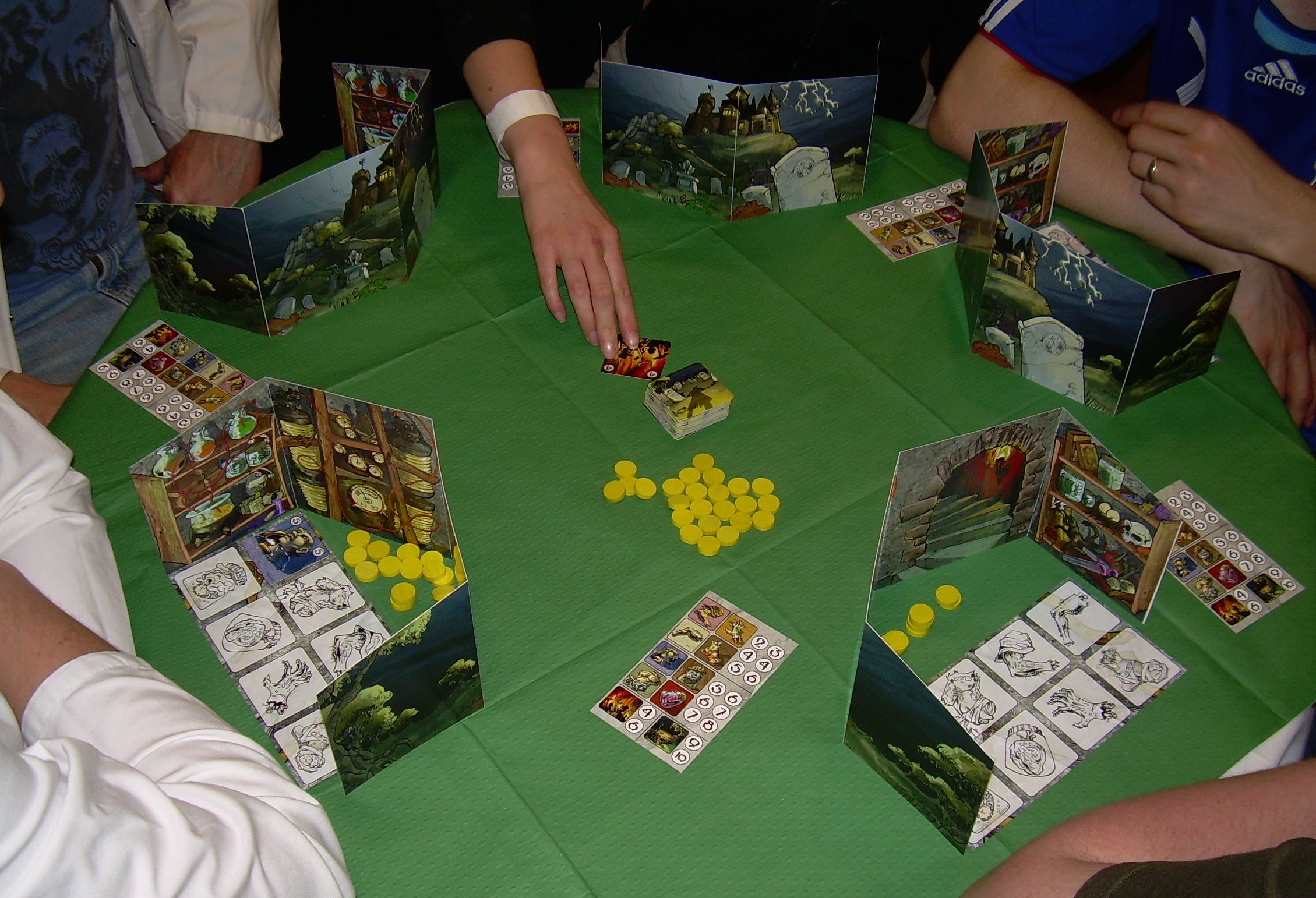
- Game in progress
- Designers: Yehuda Berlinger
- Publishers: Reiver Games
- Players: 2 to 5
- Setup time: 5 minutes
- Playing time: 20–45 minutes
- Chance: Medium
- Age range: 12 and up

It's Alive! is a light set collection and auction card game designed by Yehuda Berlinger published in 2007 by Reiver Games in English. A second edition, also by Reiver Games, with both English and German rules was published in 2008. Players assume the roles of mad scientists racing to create a monster from body parts and bring it to life.

It's Alive! can be played by two to five players and takes around 20 to 45 minutes to play.

A third edition with a family-friendly Hanukkah theme (actually, the original mockup theme) was published in 2013 as Candle Quest by Victory Point Games.

== Gameplay ==
Players take turns to choose a card and then play it. The game ends when one player cries out It's Alive! after collecting the eight body parts needed to bring their monster to life.

First a player must choose a card by either:

- Turning over the top card of the deck, for free;
- or, buying the top card out of a player's discard pile (known as their graveyard). In the third edition, the player simply buys the card to their stockpile directly out of a discard pile for one and a half times its face value and ends their turn.

Once a card has been chosen players then have three options:

- Buy that card at its face value, by paying money from their stockpile of cash to the bank;
- Sell that card to the bank, adding it to the top of their graveyard and taking half the value of the card from the bank;
- Or auction it to the other players, saying what they are prepared to pay, and giving each player one chance to out-bid them.

In addition, there are two special cards: the coffin, which is treated like a wild card, and can be used instead of any body part card, and a villagers' uprising which represents irate villagers who need to be appeased by paying them off. Duplicate cards and bought-off villagers can be used to pay for other villagers or to buy cards out of a discard pile.

== Strategy ==
Strategically, It's Alive! requires the players to manage their limited funds to get as many body parts as possible while denying their opponents cheap access to body parts that they need. Because buying an auctioned part from another player provides them with income, paying over the face value leads to another player gaining more benefit than the purchaser.

Since a player can only gain funds during their turn (by selling or auctioning a card), spending money during your turn can be a dangerous tactic, potentially leaving you unable to take part in auctions until your next turn.

Also, players need to be aware that drawing the villagers' uprising can be very expensive if provisions haven't been made to meet their price.

== See also ==
- Spank the monkey
