= Barca (board game) =

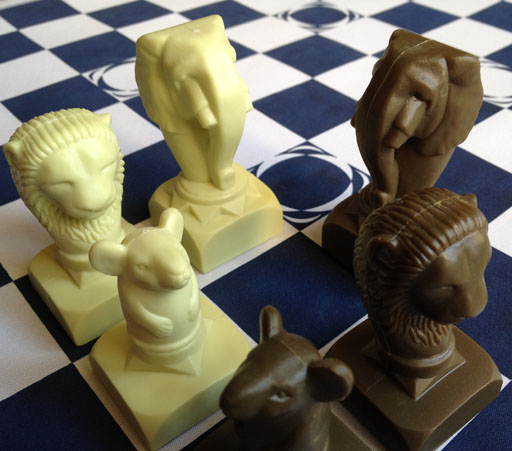
- Barca playing pieces (light and dark pieces of elephant, lion and mouse) on Barca game board with the four "watering hole" squares visible. Travel edition.
- Years active: 2007-present
- Genres: Board game
- Players: 2
- Setup time: Less than 1 minute
- Playing time: Novice games usually last 10 to 20 minutes; games between experienced players can last 10 minutes to a few hours.
- Chance: None
- Skills: Tactics, strategy

Barca is a two-player strategy board game invented by Andrew Caldwell. It is played on a 10x10 checkerboard with three types of animal playing-pieces that move like the queen, bishop and rook in chess. Two distinguishing features from a typical chess variant are the absence of capture, and the fundamental role of a rock-paper-scissors dominance relationship among the three types of pieces: elephant, lion and mouse.

Each player controls six animals, two each of three types. The object of the game is to occupy three of the four "watering hole" squares that are located near the center of the board.

A player's animals are friendly to each other, meaning they are allowed to occupy squares adjacent to each other. For opposing sides, however, the mouse fears the lion, the lion fears the elephant, and the elephant fears the mouse; an animal cannot move to a square, nor permanently abide in a square, that is adjacent to an animal it fears (with the exception of a "trapped" animal, as described in Movement Restrictions below).

Achieving the win-condition requires coordinating one's animals in support of each other to hold two of the watering holes, against the opponent's attempts to repel, while creating an opening to occupy a third watering hole.

== Rules ==
The rules of Barca are codified in the instruction manual of the retail version of the game, and also described in a video interview of Caldwell by LivingDice.com. Additional clarifications are provided by Caldwell in a Q&A web page.

=== Setup ===
Players face each other with the board between them. The animals are separated into light and dark sets with twelve animals per set and two of each animal type in a set. The animals are arranged as shown in the diagram with the two elephants side by side in the center of the back row, the two mice in front of the two elephants, and the two lions separated on each side of the mice.

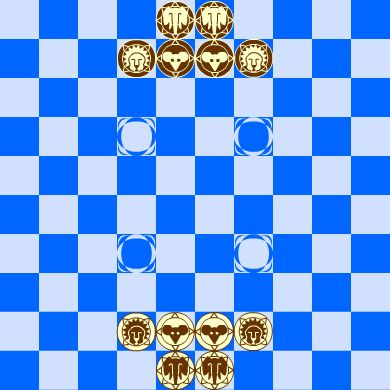
Initial positions

=== Movement ===
Players agree between themselves who shall move first, optionally playing rock-paper-scissors to resolve the question. Players then alternate turns moving one of their animals per turn.

The mouse moves along rows and columns (i.e. horizontally and vertically). The lion moves on diagonals. The elephant moves along rows, columns and diagonals. An animal can move any number of squares on the board in a single direction per turn, but may not jump over other animals.

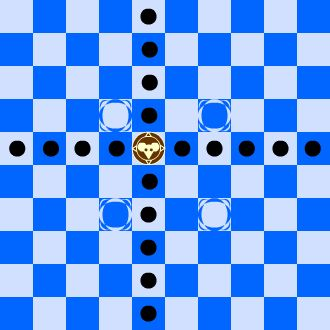
Moves of the mouse

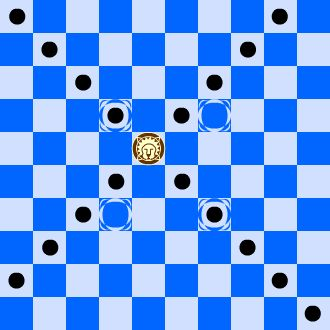
Moves of the lion

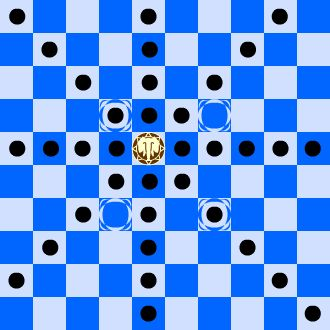
Moves of the elephant

=== Movement Restrictions ===
The rock-paper-scissors dominance-rules prevent animals moving to certain squares that would otherwise be accessible by the general movement rules described above.

A player's animals may occupy squares next to each other, but, for opposing sides, the mouse fears the lion, the lion fears the elephant, and the elephant fears the mouse. An animal may not move to a square adjacent to an animal that it fears (with one exception noted below for a "trapped" animal).

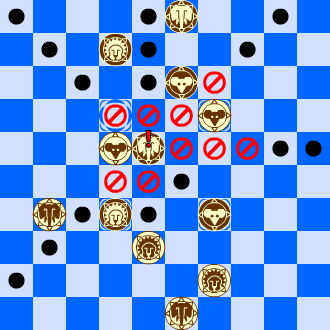
Moves available to "afraid" elephant. The red "not" symbols mark locations normally available except that the elephant would be afraid due to the adjacent opposing player's mouse.

Squares adjacent to an animal include all those within one square of the animal, horizontally, vertically and diagonally.

An animal is said to be "afraid" when it is adjacent to an animal it fears. For example, if a player moves a lion adjacent to the opposing player's mouse, then that mouse becomes afraid.

On a player's turn, if any of the player's animals are afraid, then one of them must be moved to a square where it is not afraid, if possible.

An animal is said to be "trapped" if it is afraid and its only available moves still leave it afraid.

On a player's turn, if the player has one or more animals that are afraid, but all such animals are also trapped, then the player may optionally move a trapped animal to a square where it remains afraid. This is the only case in which an animal may move to a square in which it will be afraid.

=== Winning ===
The four marked squares near the center of the board are the watering holes. The first player to get three of their animals on the watering holes at the same time wins the game. A player may win even if one or more of their animals remains afraid or trapped after the winning move.

== Popular culture ==
Barca appears in the fantasy fiction book Mortals & Deities - Book Two of the Genesis of Oblivion Saga by Maxwell Alexander Drake. In Drake's fantasy world it is described as an ancient game with the same name and rules as Barca, but with animal pieces from that world: Krugours, Niyoka and Drakons for mouse, lion and elephant (respectively).

== Trivia ==
Barca is named after the Carthaginian military commander Hannibal Barca who attacked ancient Rome with an army that included war elephants.
