= Realm of the Jade Goddess =

2007 board game

Realm of the Jade Goddess (German: Im Reich der Jadegöttin) is a German-style board game designed by Klaus Teuber and published in 2007 by Kosmos in Germany. It was originally available in limited release, and there has been no plans to release an edition for other languages.

Realm of the Jade Goddess is the first of the Entdecker trilogy of games, which are games based on Teuber's earlier game, Entdecker, but incorporate new themes and game mechanics. It is considered the easiest of the three games in the trilogy.

== Gameplay ==
The players take roles of explorers in a jungle, in search of artifacts from a mysterious "lost city". Gameplay takes place on a board 11 tiles wide and deep, with the central row and column fully explored; players begin the game with their explorers (represented by jeeps) in the center space of the board. Each tile consists of either jungle sections or sections of the lost city, and lines in white or brown run through the centers of each tile (white if it runs through a jungle quadrant and brown otherwise).

The game also comes with a second type of tile, the "artifact tile", which serves as the treasures to be retrieved in the game. There are both "good" and "bad" artifacts, which differ in their scoring value at the end of the game. Each artifact token also consists of a particular quarter of an artifact, which are labeled "A", "B", "C", and "D".

At the start of a player's turn, a player may move their jeep. Jeeps may freely move along white lines, and must stop their movement after moving on a brown line. With the exception of the central (starting) tile, only one jeep may occupy any tile.

If the jeep moves to a tile adjacent to unexplored terrain (that is, where no tiles are present), one tile is placed to "explore" the area. Tiles are generally randomly drawn, and must be placed so that the colors of connecting lines match between adjacent tiles. If a player draws a tile that cannot be placed, they are set aside in a player's reserve, and may be placed on subsequent explorations in lieu of drawing tiles. The player's jeep is then placed on the newly explored tile. If the player drew a tile consisting of all jungle, the player may move their jeep a second time, placing tiles if necessary.

After tiles are placed, players may place an archaeologist on any lost city section of the tile, or remove an already-placed archaeologist figure. Each player has three single archaeologist figures, and one each of archaeologist figures that count as two and three archaeologists. Placing a single archaeologist is free, but a double or triple archaeologist costs one or two gold pieces, respectively, to place. When the lost city is completed (that is, when it is entirely surrounded by jungle or by the edge of the game board), the lost city is considered completed, and players gain gold pieces and artifacts depending on the number of gold coins and artifact heads depicted on each tile making up the lost city: each player having at least one archaeologist receives gold equal to the number of gold coins in the city. The player(s) with the most archaeologists in the lost city receives artifact tiles based on the number of artifact heads in the lost city. The player(s) with the second most receives half the number of artifact tiles (rounded up), and so on until every player with archaeologists in the lost city receives artifact tiles. (The exception to this rule is when there is only one artifact symbol, in which case "runners-up" receive nothing).

Players may choose to move their jeep to the central (starting) tile, which allows the player to exchange one artifact tile in their possession with one of five artifact tiles that were exposed at the start of the game, or exchanging two artifact tiles for two randomly drawn artifact tiles for the price of one gold piece.

After a player finishes their turn, the player may take a second turn by paying one gold piece.

The game ends when all tiles are taken (that is, all tiles are either on the board or in the reserves of players) or when all artifact tiles have been claimed; in the case of the former, each player has one final turn. Each artifact tile is worth one victory point, and a completed set of artifacts ("A, "B", "C", and "D") is worth 5 extra points if the set consists of only "good" artifacts" and 3 points otherwise. The player with the most points wins, with the number of artifact tiles and the number of gold pieces used as a tiebreaker.
