= Brass (board game) =

Economic strategy game

- A game of Brass: Lancashire.
- Designers: Martin Wallace
- Illustrators: Peter Dennis, Eckhard Freytag (Peagus Speile edition)
- Publishers: Warfrog Games (UK); Pegasus Spiele (Germany); FRED Distribution (U.S.); Eagle Games (U.S.); White Goblin Games (France, Benelux); Wargames Club Publishing (China)
- Publication: 2007
- Players: 2 to 4
- Setup time: approx. 5 minutes
- Playing time: 120 minutes
- Chance: Medium-low
- Age range: 13 years and up
- Skills: Resource management, Planning, Economics

Brass is a board game set in Lancashire, England during the Industrial Revolution. It was developed by Martin Wallace. The goal of the game is accrue the most victory points by building mines, cotton factories, ports, canals and rail links, and establishing trade routes. The game is divided into two historical periods: the canal period and the rail period. Victory points are scored at the end of each period.

== Details ==
The game supports 2-4 players, with a playing time of 1-2 hours. The game's suggested age range is 14 and up.

=== Publisher ===
The game was published in 2007 by Warfrog (now Treefrog) Games, Wallace's publishing company. It was later published by Pegasus Spiele as Kohle - Mit Volldampf zum Reichtum ('Coal - Full Steam Ahead to Riches') with additional artwork by Eckhard Freytag, and under its original name by Eagle Games and FRED Distribution (USA), White Goblin Games (France) and Wargames Club Publishing (China)

Age of Industry

Wallace followed Brass with a streamlined version known as Age of Industry. This version removes the earlier canal era, shortens playtime, and allows for two-player play. Age of Industry also featured multiple maps, with the base game including both New England and Germany along with an official expansion adding Japan and Minnesota.

==== 2018 reprint and successor ====
In 2017, Canadian publisher Roxley Games launched a Kickstarter campaign to fund a reprint of the game retitled Brass: Lancashire, featuring new artwork and components as well as slightly modified rules. Roxley also announced a successor, Brass: Birmingham, adding Gavan Brown and Matt Tolman to the design team and featuring new mechanisms while keeping the same core rule-set. The campaign succeeded, reaching 1.7m CAD. Both games received retail releases in 2018.

In February 2023, Brass: Birmingham reached the No. 1 spot as the top rated board game on leading website BoardGameGeek.

== Honours ==
- 2007 Jogo do Ano Winner
- 2007 Jogo do Ano Nominee
- 2007 Meeples' Choice Award
- 2008 Golden Geek Best Gamer's Board Game Nominee
- 2008 International Gamers Awards - General Strategy; Multi-player Nominee
- 2008 Tric Trac Nominee
- 2010 Nederlandse Spellenprijs Nominee

Brass: Birmingham

- 2018: Golden Geek Best Strategy Board Game
- 2018: Board Game Quest Awards Best Production Values
- 2018: Meeples’ Choice Award
- 2018: The Golden Elephant Award Best Heavy Board Game
- 2018: The Golden Elephant Award People's Choice
- 2020: Gra Roku Advanced Game of the Year
- 2020: Gra Roku Game of the Year
