= Cutthroat Caverns =

Cutthroat Caverns is a 2007 board game published by Smirk & Dagger Games.

== Contents ==
Cutthroat Caverns is a game in which a semi‑cooperative dungeon crawl requires players to survive nine encounters together while ruthlessly competing to land the killing blow and earn the most prestige, with the twist that if the party dies, everyone loses.

== Reviews ==
- Pyramid
- Rue Morgue #73
- Level 166
