= Spank the monkey =

2003 card game by Peter Hansson

Spank the Monkey
- Players: 2-6 (recommended: 3-4)
- Setup time: 5 minutes
- Playing time: 30 minutes
- Chance: High
- Age range: 12+
- Skills: Dice rolling

Spank the Monkey is a card game created by Peter Hansson, in which players are workers at a junk yard. A monkey has climbed the highest scrap pile, and it is each player's job to climb the scrap pile and bring down the monkey by spanking it.

== Gameplay ==
The goal of the game is to build a tower of the same height as the scrap pile on which the monkey resides. The tower is built by playing Junk-cards, each of which has a height and a strength. The junk can be reinforced by playing reinforcement-cards. When the player's tower has reached the height of the monkey, that player may try to spank it by rolling a die. If successful, that player wins the game. It is easiest to spank the monkey from exactly the same level, but it is also possible to do so from above.

Players can also attack other players' towers using attack-cards. They can be one of throwing attack, hand attack and sneak attack. Throwing attacks can attack at any height. Hand attack can attack only at the same height as the target opponent, and sneak attacks is a catch-all for other types of attacks. Players can defend themselves using defense-cards. There are also special-cards which can affect the game in various ways.

== Expansions ==
There is two expansion sets, Monkey Business and primate fear.
