= Eagles of the Empire: Friedland =

Eagles of the Empire: Friedland is a 1995 board game published by Games USA.

== Gameplay ==
Eagles of the Empire: Friedland is a game in which gameplay unfolds as a sequence of area‑based activations where leaders, terrain, and stacked combat modifiers determine whether piecemeal attacks, coordinated assaults, or cavalry–infantry clashes produce retreats, losses, or breakthroughs.

== Reception ==
Perfidious Albion felt that "So what can one say of Friedland? it is moderately quick and most of you should be able to complete most scenarios. [...] I think it is rather uninspiring but it may be the only accessible game in the category."

== Reviews ==
- Casus Belli #092
