= Eagles of the Empire: Borodino =

1994 board game

Eagles of the Empire: Borodino is a 1994 board game published by Games USA.

== Gameplay ==
Borodino is a game in which a fast Napoleonic battle has divisions maneuver across areas, leaders struggle to activate troops, artillery and morale shape each clash, and combat resolves through modifier‑heavy dice that steadily grind formations down.

== Reception ==
Perfidious Albion felt that "Borodino may not be complex in its systems but it is not a stupid system."
