= About Time (board game) =

Board game

About Time is a general knowledge historical board game first seen on Series 5 of the BBC new-business reality show Dragon's Den on December 17, 2007.

The game was invented by Joe Gill, Iain McGill, Matt Gould and Michele Rosaus, who together formed a company, Circa Circa Ltd, to launch the game in the UK. The game's distinctive artwork is by Michele Rosaus.

The game is part of a growing subgenre of trivia games in which players compete by giving numerical answers, in this case years, to questions rather than factual answers.

== Gameplay ==
Players progress by giving answers that are closest to the correct year on the question cards. The question cards all feature six events and a year in which the events took place. Chips are used as rewards and can be won or lost during high-stakes board play.

Each card contains questions in six subject categories including arts, politics, everyday life and innovation. Player pieces are iconic historical figures including Napoleon, Queen Elizabeth I, Genghis Khan and William Shakespeare.

== Editions ==
In 2008, in a promotional tie-in with The Guardian newspaper, About Time used the newspaper's archive to add content to the game.

In Germany, a German language edition of the game, About Time Das Zeit Spiel, was launched in 2009 in association with Die Zeit, the Hamburg-based weekly newspaper. The game contains content from the newspaper.

About Time, USA Edition, was launched in 2009.
