= Age of Steam (game) =

Board game

- Designers: Martin Wallace
- Publishers: Warfrog Games, Winsome Games, Eagle-Gryphon Games
- Publication: 2002
- Players: 1-8
- Playing time: 2-3 hours
- Age range: 13+

Age of Steam is a strategy board game designed by Martin Wallace, and originally published in 2002 by Warfrog Games on license from Winsome Games. The game depicts the era when pioneering railroad companies built the tracks that transformed the American economy. Its expansion maps adapt the base game, usually with some rule modifications, for play in various locations. The base game "Rust Belt" map can be played by three to six players, usually takes between 2 and 3 hours to complete, and is intended for ages 13 and above. The game supports over two hundred expansion maps, with more continually being created by its extensive fan base, as well as by the original designer.

== Legal dispute ==
Age of Steam was designed and developed by Martin Wallace. Ownership over the name and rights to the game has been disputed, with both Wallace and John Bohrer from Winsome Games, who wrote up the formal rulebook, holding claims. Early editions of the game depict Martin Wallace as the designer, but Bohrer's name becomes increasingly prominent on later editions. Complicating the matter further, the publisher has changed several times over the years. On February 10, 2007, Martin Wallace filed a trademark claim with the US Patent and Trademark office for the name "Age of Steam." On July 22, 2008, Bohrer filed a competing patent, and eventually prevailed. "Age of Steam" is now a registered trademark of John Bohrer and Winsome Games.

Martin Wallace published a slightly different game by the name of "Steam" in partnership with a different company, Mayfair Games. The latest version of the game is Age of Steam: Deluxe Edition, published by Winsome Games.

== Awards ==
In 2003, Age of Steam won the International Gamers Award.

== See also ==
- Train game
- Railways of the World
