= Eagle Games =

Game publishing company

- Industry: Board game publisher
- Founded: 2001
- Founder: Glenn Drover
- Headquarters: Leitchfield, Kentucky
- Website: eagle-gryphon.com

Eagle Games, now known as Eagle-Gryphon games, is a board game publisher.

== Background ==
Eagle Games was founded in 2001 by Glenn Drover, and was bought by Ashland, Oregon-based FRED Distribution, Inc. doing business as Gryphon Games in 2007. From 2007 to 2014 they published games under the two lines as Gryphon Games and Eagle Games.

They are currently based in Leitchfield, Kentucky and are now known as Eagle-Gryphon Games. Eagle-Gryphon Games is known for a large catalog of games that range from fast, fun family games to larger strategy games with longer game time. Rick Soued is the CEO.

== Board games ==
Notable titles

- Age of Steam
- The American Civil War
- Baseball Highlights 2045
- Brass
- Cheeky Monkey
- Civilization
- Conquest of the Empire
- Defenders of the Realm
- Fantastiqa
- Fleet
- For Sale
- Francis Drake
- I'm the Boss
- Incan Gold
- Lisboa
- Master's Gallery
- On Mars
- Pastiche
- Rococo
- Roll Through the Ages: Bronze Age
- Roll Through the Ages: Iron Age
- Take It Easy
- The Gallerist
- The Pick A Pig/Pick A Dog/Pick A Polar Bear series
- The Railways of the World series
- Through the Ages
- Triassic Terror
- Vinhos Deluxe Edition
- War! Age of Imperialism
