= Panzer Grenadier series =

Series of board wargames

Panzer Grenadier Series
- Cover of the original Panzer Grenadier game with art by Brian J. Miller
- Designers: Michael Bennighof
- Publishers: Avalanche Press
- Publication: 2000–2026
- Genres: Platoon combat in the 20th century

Panzer Grenadier Series is a long-running series of board wargames published by Avalanche Press starting in 2000 that simulates platoon-level combat during the twentieth century. By 2026, Avalanche had published over 140 games in this series.

== Description ==
The original game from which the series has taken its name is Panzer Grenadier, subtitled "Platoon Level Combat in World War II". It was designed by Michael Bennighof, and was published by Avalanche Press in 2000 with artwork by Brian J. Miller.

The wargame, set on the Eastern Front during World War II uses four 11"x17" isomorphic hex grid map scaled at 200 metres (220 yd) and 330 2/3-inch die-cut counters. The rules are contained within a 16-page rulebook. All subsequent games in this series use the same scale of map, and the same rules (which have been revised to a second, third and fourth edition, the latter being published in 2014.) The 64-page scenario book contains 51 scenarios.

=== Gameplay ===
==== Initiative ====
Rather than using a standard "I Go, You Go" turn in which one player moves most or all pieces and fires, followed by the second player, Panzer Grenadier introduces a random element to determine which player moves first: Both players roll two dice, modified by a factor defined in the particular scenario. The player with the highest result moves first. The difference between the two results divided by two represents the number of extra action phases the winning player receives before the second player gets an action phase.

==== Action phase ====
During an action phase, a leader counter or a stack of units may activate units in the same or adjacent hexes which may then may move or fire. These units are then finished acting for the rest of the turn. The players take turns having an action phase until both players have run out of units to move or choose not to move. This marks the end of the game turn. The players roll for initiative again to start the next turn.

== The series ==
In 2001, Avalanche published three sequels (Hereoes of the Soviet Union, Airborne and Lions of Finland) that all used the same rules from Panzer Grenadier as well as the same map scale. Once a player had learned the rules for one game, the player knew the rules for all of the games.

Avalanche continued to publish more games in the series, eventually moving out of World War II to the Korean War, and then to twentieth-century conflicts around the globe. Between 2000 and 2026, Avalanche published more than 140 games and modules in the series.

== Reception ==
Writing for Pyramid, Scott Schafer reviewed the original Panzer Grenadier game upon which all subsequent games in the series were based, and noted that, despite the relatively simple rules, "The sheer breadth of decision-making is enormous within this game, and each decision can have consequences down the road." Schafer felt the rules made the game more manageable in terms of time needed to complete a game, pointing out, "This game strips away a lot of the plaque that has built up around platoon level combat. This is a game where you can have a huge mass of counters, and still have some shot at finishing the scenario." Schafer's only complaint was that although the maps were historically and geographically accurate, they were boring. Despite this, Schafer concluded "Overall this game gives you a lot of bang for the buck. It hides its complexity well, which makes it easy to teach. New players are not frustrated by the system, but enamored of the possibilities that the battlefield presents ... In all, Panzer Grenadier is well worth the money I spent on it."

Armchair General reviewed Airborne, stating "While it is supposed to be an introduction to the larger series of games, Airborne is a very entertaining game by itself." In another review, Armchair General recommended Road to Berlin to Panzer Grenadier fanatics and East Front armor fans.

Al Borke, writing for Wargamer, noted, "I would recommend this game to people who like tactical boardgames, but either want a break from or are turned off by a complex set of rules. Computer players who like games such as Talonsoft's Campaign Series might also want to give another genre a shot."

In Issue 45 of the French game magazine Backstab, Lévan Sharif gave both Guadalcanal and Desert Rats a rating of three out of five.

== Boxed games in the series ==
=== Panzer Grenadier ===
The original game in the series, Panzer Grenadier was eventually replaced by Eastern Front.

=== Heroes of the Soviet Union ===
Added more German and Soviet counters and two mounted maps and 24 scenarios to the original Panzer Grenadier game, which were both replaced with Eastern Front game.

=== Eastern Front ===
The deluxe replacement for the Panzer Grenadier game. Set in 1941., it features 112 scenarios and includes German, Romanian and Russian troops and 8 maps.

=== Road to Berlin ===
Set in 1945 and features 75 scenarios.

=== Beyond Normandy ===
Allied forces confront Waffen SS in Normandy.

=== Airborne Introductory Edition ===
Intended to introduce players to the Panzer Grenadier series and focuses on American paratroopers during the D-Day landings.

=== Semper Fi! Guadalcanal ===
The first boxed game in the Panzer Grenadier series set in the Pacific theater. It consists of Japanese forces defending the island of Guadalcanal from U.S. Marines, including Raiders and Paratroopers, in 1942.

=== Afrika Korps ===
Covers North Africa in 1940–1941.

=== Desert Rats ===
The sequel to Afrika Korps and is set in 1941–1942.

=== Battle of the Bulge ===
Covers the Battle of the Bulge. It has 51 scenarios and many tanks on each side.

=== Battle of the Bulge 2: Elsenborn Ridge ===
Covers the northern half of the Battle of the Bulge.

=== 1940: The Fall of France ===
Covers the German invasion of France in 1940. Includes 50 scenarios and eight semi-rigid boards.

=== Cassino '44 ===
Covers the Allied battles around the historic abbey of Monte Cassino in Italy. Scenarios cover all 4 battles and include 2 campaign games.

=== Saipan 1944 ===
Covers the American invasion of the island of Saipan in the Pacific. 40 scenarios and 4 maps.

=== Korean War: Pusan Perimeter ===
Covers the initial North Korean (NKPA) surges in 1950 across the 38th Parallel where South Korean (ROK) and American troops in 1950 must try to halt the advance. First in a mini-series of Korean War games within the Panzer Grenadier series. 48 scenarios and 4 maps.

=== Kursk, South Flank ===
Set in 1943 and features 50 scenarios where Germans and Soviets clash in the biggest tanks battles.

=== Liberation 1944 ===
More battles after the Allied invasion on D-Day and features 41 scenarios.

=== Kursk: Burning Tigers ===
Covers the remainder of the Kursk battles, mostly on the Northern Flank in 1943 and features 40 scenarios.

=== An Army At Dawn ===
Covers the Allied and Axis battles in Morocco, Algeria and Tunisia in 1942-1943 and features 40 scenarios.

=== Conquest of Ethiopia ===
The Italian Army and Colonial troops battle the Imperial Ethiopian Army for control of Ethiopia in 1935-1937 in 40 scenarios.

=== Broken Axis ===
More Eastern Front action set in 1944 and features 50 scenarios.

=== The Kokoda Campaign ===
Covers the battles in New Guinea for control of Port Moresby with Australians and Japanese battling it out. Adds 30 scenarios and 2 maps.

=== Invasion 1944 ===
American troops fight German troops in the days following the landings in Normandy.

=== Korean War: Counter-Attack ===
Picks up where Pusan Perimeter leaves off, pitting American Army, American Marines, British, South Korean (ROK) troops against the North Korean (NKPA) troops in the August–October 1950 actions before the Chinese enter the war. There are 6 maps and 65 scenarios.

=== Fire in the Steppe ===
Set in 1941 and features 60 scenarios with Soviet, German, and Romanian troops battling for Ukraine with 8 maps.

=== Road to Dunkirk ===
British Expeditionary Force against the Germans in the spring and early summer of 1940. There are 47 scenarios and 8 maps.

== Book Supplements ==
Book Supplements are generally 64 pages of scenarios and historic background information and usually include additional counters. Some do include any maps and require other games to play the scenarios.

=== Sinister Forces ===
Adds Waffen SS and NKVD units to the series and is set on the Eastern Front.

=== Fronte Russo ===
Designed by Ottavio Ricchi and Lorenzo Striuli, and covers the Italian Expeditionary Corps operations on the Eastern Front against the Soviet Union.

=== Jungle Fighting ===
A scenario-only book for use with Guadalcanal. It has 42 scenarios and another map printed on the back of the book.

=== Arctic Front ===
A module that covers the Winter War between the Soviet Union and Finland. (Modules are not playable by themselves — Arctic Front requires Eastern Front for most of the scenarios.)

=== Edelweiss ===
Another module, it adds German mountain troops to Panzer Grenadier. Edelweiss also includes four 1 1/3" counters, twice the size as regular counters. These include two German Karl mortars and two Soviet river monitors.

=== Black SS ===
Another module, it adds late war SS troops and scenarios. 30 scenarios included and a counter sheet with 165 pieces replacing SS units from other games with new black backgrounds (instead of camo). 1940: The Fall of France, Elsenborn Ridge, Road to Berlin and Beyond Normandy are required to play the scenarios.

=== Marianas 1944 ===
'Covers the Battles of Tinian 1944, Guam 1941 and Guam 1944 and is a supplement for Saipan 1944, pitting American and Guam Insular Force Guard (GIFG) units against Japanese troops. Adds 30 scenarios, 24 counters and two maps to Saipan 1944.

=== White Eagles ===
Adds the 1939 Polish Army into the Panzer Grenadier action with 165 counters and 40 scenarios.

=== Iron Curtain: Patton's Nightmare ===
A hypothetical war between the American and Soviet armies in 1947 has 77 counters and 20 scenarios.

=== Hammer & Sickle ===
A hypothetical war between the American and Soviet armies in 1951, it has 77 counters and 20 scenarios.

=== Iron Curtain: Red And White Poland Resists ===
A hypothetical war between the NATO Polish, American Armies against Soviet Army in 1951 and has 77 counters and 40 scenarios.

=== Secret Weapons ===
Secret Weapons is a hypothetical extended World War II with newer weapons developed by many nations in WWII but never used in action from 1944 to 1947 and has 77 counters and 30 scenarios. Other games are needed to play.

=== First Axis: Slovakia At War ===
First Axis: Slovakia At War covers the battles of Slovak troops from 1939-1944, adds 30 scenarios, 88 counters and requires other games to play.Scenarios include Slovakia's brief war with Hungary in 1939, battles with Poland later that year, campaigns in Russia, the 1944 Slovak rising, and a battle between Slovak forces and Italian Social Republic troops.

=== Go for Broke ===
Go for Broke covers the battles of Japanese-American regiment from 1943-1945, adds 30 scenarios, 77 counters and requires other games to play. The 442nd Regiment and its 100th Infantry Battalion are given the regiment's badge on its counters.

=== Panzer Lehr: The Panzer Lehr Division in Normandy, 1944 ===
Panzer Lehr: The Panzer Lehr Division in Normandy, 1944 covers the battles of Panzer Lehr Division in Normandy 1944, adds 27 scenarios, 102 counters but requires other games to play.

=== Kokoda Trail ===
Kokoda Trail covers the battles in New Guinea for control of Port Moresby with Australians and Japanese battling it out. Adds 30 scenarios and 2 maps but requires other games to play.

=== Workers and Peasants The Red Army at War ===
Worker and Peasants the Red Army at War Focuses on the Germans initial battles in Russian in 1941. Adds 25 scenarios and 165 counters but requires other games to play.

=== Winter Soldiers ===
Winter Soldiers. More Battle of the Bulge scenarios, kind of bridges the missing scenarios from the two Bulge games; Battle of the Bulge and Elsenborn Ridge. Adds 30 scenarios but requires other games to play.

=== Tank Battles ===
Tank Battles Now out of print but covers mostly Eastern Front battles and a few other unique battles. Adds 46 scenarios but requires other games to play.

=== Invasion Of Germany ===
Invasion Of Germany covers Western Front battles of 1944. Adds 48 scenarios but requires other games to play.

=== River Fleets ===
River Fleets is a spiral bond book but incorporates both counters and maps. Adds Serbian, Romanian and Austro-Hungarian counters to maps and 10 scenarios to the series. Lots of new river fighting ships/boats are added as well.

=== Spearhead Division ===
Spearhead Division Third Armored Division fought its way from Normandy deep into Germany. Adds 25 scenarios, 88 counters American counters but requires Elsenborn Ridge to play. The counters are in yellow and have the division's "Spearhead" symbol on them.

=== Leyte 1944 ===
Leyte 1944 The Battles to retake Leyte in hard fought battles which include Japanese paratroopers. Adds 46 scenarios, adds 88 counters but requires Saipan 1944 and Marianas 1944 to play.

== Spiral-Bound supplements ==
=== Iron Curtain ===
Iron Curtain is a fictional supplement covering a war between the United States and the Soviet Union in 1945 and 1946.

=== South Africa's War ===
South Africa's War covers the operations of South Africa's military between 1940 and 1942 in Somaliland, Ethiopia, Egypt and Libya. Adds 20 scenarios and 88 counters but requires other games to play. The counters are for the South African Army, and appear in Africa Orientale Italiana, in the campaigns to liberate Ethiopia.

=== Blue Division ===
Blue Division covers the Spanish "Blue Division" on the Eastern Front. Adds 88 counters and 20 scenarios. The blue counters represent the Spanish 250th Infantry Division. Officers are given their Spanish-language ranks.

=== Red Warriors ===
Red Warriors adds Soviet Guards forces to Panzer Grenadier. The now out-of-print Heroes of the Soviet Union supplement contained the counters and half of the scenarios, all of which have been rewritten for this supplement.

=== Nihon Silk ===
Nihon Silk adds Japanese paratroopers from different engagements from 1942 to 1945 in 10 scenarios with 165 counters. This supplement requires other games to play.

=== Power Of The East ===
Power Of The East Shows the conflict over Manchuria between Japanese and Soviet troops from 1938 to 1939. Adds 12 scenarios with 165 counters. This supplement requires other games to play.

=== Waltzing Matilda The Defense of Australia, 1942 ===
Waltzing Matilda The Defense of Australia, 1942 covers hypothetical battles of Japan invading Australia in 1942. Adds 12 scenarios with 330 counters. This supplement requires other games to play.

=== Divisione Corazzata ===
Divisione Corazzata covers hypothetical battles with Italian Army having better tanks. Adds 10 scenarios with 88 counters from the Gold Club. This supplement requires other games to play.

=== Indian Unity ===
Indian Unity covers actual battles between India and Hyderabad in 1948. Adds 10 scenarios with 165 counters. This supplement requires other games to play. Counters provided are those of the Nizam of Hyderabad's army, all in red.

=== Hopeless But Not Serious ===
Hopeless But Not Serious The Austrian Federal Army 1934-1938, covers actual and theoretical battles between Austrians and Nazis. Adds 16 scenarios with 330 counters. This supplement requires other games to play.

=== Iron Wolves Lithuania's Army ===
Iron Wolves Lithuania's Army covers the Lithuania's Army in 1939–1941. Adds 10 scenarios with 165 counters. This supplement requires other games to play. Counters are those of the Lithuanian Army and the Polish Home Army of the resistance. The former had the Lithuanian lion badge and the latter use the AK (Arma Krajowa) anchor-like symbol on a white field.

=== DAK '44 ===
DAK '44 covers hypothetical battles of Combat In North Africa, 1944. Adds 10 scenarios with 165 counters. This supplement requires other games to play. Counters are similar to those of DAK, although being later-model German units.

=== Iron Curtain: Maple Leaf Brigade ===
Map Leaf Brigade covers and adds the Canadians troops to the early Cold-War series within the Panzer Grenadier series. Adds 88 counters, 10 scenarios but this supplement requires ownership of other games. Canadian forces are white with red Maple Leaf symbols.

=== Golden Journal: Summer 2013 ===
Summer 2013 Part of the Avalanche Press Gold-Club series, The Fall of Luxembourg, adds 20 Luxembourg counters and a couple of scenarios.

=== Gold Club counters: Division Marocain ===
Division Marocain 2014. Adds 176 Moroccan counters to the Fall of France game and a few scenarios.

=== Golden Journal: Equinox 2015 ===
Equinox 2015 Part of the Avalanche Press Gold-Club series, adds late model Japanese Armor counters for what if scenarios and corrected Marine counters for the earlier release of Saipan 1944.

=== Golden Journal: Aphelion 2015 ===
Aphelion 2015 Part of the Avalanche Press Gold-Club series, adds East-German Cold-War counters to the Cold-War series and a few scenarios.

=== Golden Journal: Columbus Day 2015 ===
Columbus Day 2015 Part of the Avalanche Press Gold-Club series, Called The last Horse Soldier and adds what if American Mounted Cavalry counters to the Army at Dawn game and a couple of scenarios. The 1st Cavalry Division's symbol is the black horse and stripe on a yellow shield, as today.

=== Golden Journal: St. Patrick's Day 2016 ===
St. Patrick's Day 2016 Part of the Avalanche Press Gold-Club series, adds Irish Army (Garda) counters for a few what-if scenarios. The Irish face both German and British forces. The Irish counters are green with a harp symbol.

=== Golden Journal: Groundhog Day 2016 ===
Groundhog Day 2016 Part of the Avalanche Press Gold-Club series, adds German Armor counters that could have been produced and used in the Battle of Kursk and a few scenarios.

== Scenario booklets (no counters) ==
Scenario booklets are add-ons with 10 scenarios. They do not have any counters or maps, therefore requiring the ownership of other games. Avalanche Press intends to release a scenario booklet every month that does not have another Panzer Grenadier game launching.

=== North Wind ===
North Wind, released in August 2007, is the first of the scenario-only booklets and covers the German Operation Nordwind.

=== Alaska's War ===
Alaska's War covers the Japanese invasion of the Aleutian Islands and the American missions to recapture them.

=== March on Leningrad ===
March on Leningrad, announced on March 24, 2008, is a new scenario booklet covering the German offensive towards Leningrad in the summer of 1941.

=== Siege of Leningrad ===
Siege of Leningrad, announced along with March to Leningrad on March 24, 2008, is based on the later part of the siege of Leningrad and the Red Army's attacks in 1943 and 1944.

=== Army Group South Ukraine: Battles in Bessarabia, 1944 ===
Army Group South Ukraine focuses on defensive battles of the Grossdeutschland Division Infantry Regiment Großdeutschland in Bessarabia, Romania.

=== Panzer Lion: Grossdeutschland in Action, 1944 ===
Panzer Lion has more scenarios for Grossdeutschland Infantry Regiment Großdeutschland.

=== Little Saturn ===
Little Saturn Death of the Armata Italiana in Russia. Adds 10 scenarios but requires other games to play.

=== Carpathian Brigade ===
Carpathian Brigade Desert battles of the Polish Exiles. Adds 11 scenarios but requires other games to play.
