= Great War at Sea series =

Series of war board games

The Great War at Sea series of board wargames released by Avalanche Press features operational and tactical-level naval combat in the period of the early battleships and dreadnoughts (various titles cover from 1898 to 1930). Each game in the series comes with a common rule book and tactical map, as well as game-specific operational map, counters and scenarios.

There have been nine games in the series to date, and it was the basis for Avalanche's spin-off series the Second World War at Sea, as well as a proposed new series dealing with ironclads. It has proven very popular, with the third game being Avalanche's sixth best selling title. Also, two of the titles have received Origins Awards.

== Overview ==
The focus of Great War at Sea series games features two levels of play: the "operational" game, where fleets move and conduct missions on a map of the area where the game takes place (this map uses "staggered squares"—technically a hex grid—presumably to save space as the squares are exactly the same size as the fleet counters, and only a few counters are on the board at a time); and the "tactical" game, where the individual ships maneuver and fire on a generic open sea tactical map.

Turns in the strategic segment are about 3 hours, and fleets are given missions when they set out. With many missions, the entire route and actions must be pre-plotted at the beginning, with some more flexible assignments (usually raiding or searching) only requiring two turns of planning. Each force is represented on the map with a single counter, so the composition is not known to the enemy. Raiding forces are not placed on the map until they do something (like attack merchant shipping), or is found by searching enemy forces. So, much of the game is spent with forces going about pre-determined missions while reaction forces attempt to find them and force them to battle, or to abort their mission.

Once two forces do find each other, combat is resolved by means of a light tactical system. Each ship bigger than a destroyer has its own counter, while destroyers and smaller vessels have counters that can represent one to three ships.

There is a certain amount of record-keeping in the system, with hits from combat being recorded against gunnery, hull or speed factors. Fuel is also tracked, with provisions for refueling in port as well as at sea. For combat, ships are primarily rated as having primary, secondary and tertiary gunnery factors, which have different ranges and ability to penetrate armor to do damage.

== Reception ==
Great War at Sea: U.S. Navy Plan Orange won the Origins Awards for "Best Historical Board Game" of 1998.

In 2000, Great War at Sea: 1904-1905, The Russo-Japanese Naval War won the Origins Awards for Best Historical Board Game of 1999.
