= Solitaire board wargame =

Single-player board game

Board wargaming in the modern, commercial sense have generally concentrated on gameplay designed for two or more participants. While playing solitaire (i.e., alone) is possible with any game, it is generally done so as an exercise in analysis rather than for enjoyment.

== History ==
Commercial solitaire wargames have existed from at least the early 1970s. Operation Olympic was perhaps the earliest and was published in 1974.

A solitaire game is a form of puzzle, though the enjoyment of solitaire games are as much in the playing as in the eventual solving of the puzzle. A well designed solitaire game attempts to immerse the player in the subject matter, forcing him to make decisions of the same kind made by his historical counterparts who participated in the actual battles or events being simulated. The best games do this through presenting gameplay options based on reality rather than artificial game restraints.

One of the first solitaire board wargames was Iwo Jima, a magazine game by TSR and released in 1983. That same year, Avalon Hill produced B-17, Queen of the Skies, possibly the very first boxed solitaire board wargame.

Ambush! is arguably the most successful solitaire board wargame ever made, appearing in 1984 and having spawned three add on games, a companion series of two games, a two-player version, and a similar game focusing on armor in the Second World War.

Another solitaire man to man game to appear in 1984 was Ranger by Omega Games, which focused on patrolling missions in a fictional and speculative conflict in Central America.

Ambush! appears to have validated the concept of designing specifically for solitaire play, as other very ambitious and innovative titles appeared in its wake. These include:

- Mosby's Raiders (Victory Games, 1985)
- Eastern Front Solitaire (Omega Games, 1986)
- Raid on St. Nazaire (Avalon Hill, 1987)
- Tokyo Express (Victory Games, 1988)
- Open Fire (Victory Games, 1988)
- Solitaire Advanced Squad Leader (Avalon Hill, 1995)

Recently, there have been several downloadable titles for solitaire play on wargamedownloads.com, such as Solitaire Caesar, Barbarossa Solitaire and Vietnam Solitaire.

== Design ==
The key concept in solitaire games is the creation of a simulated opponent. While Iwo Jima relied on the static nature of the Japanese defences to avoid the need for another human player, and B-17 created opposition by the use of simple charts and dice rolls, Ambush! had an innovative set of "mission cards" that one read in a view sleeve, with entries corresponding to the hexes on the game map. The view sleeve would reveal three digit numbers, corresponding to numbered entries in a book of paragraphs, which would orient the player to the game's situation, activate the simulated opponent, or simply provide atmosphere. The game was heavily action-adventure oriented and had a considerable role playing component. The paragraph booklet also guided the opponent's actions, and each character on the opposing side also had a small card with attributes and a table for selecting paragraphs to guide their actions during gameplay. Ranger was also paragraph driven, but lacked counters and was more abstract (and perhaps realistic) as a result. Combat! by Ross Mortell and Compass Games uses a card based initiative track system to determine the order that enemy units act to simulate a "human" opponent more realistically.

B-17, Queen of the Skies can be looked at as an example of an unsuccessful solitaire board wargame from the point of view of design. The player was presented with no realistic challenges akin to what a historical B-17 pilot would have faced. While the real challenge for a B-17 pilot was the physical task of keeping the aircraft aloft and in formation, these challenges are obviously absent from the game. The navigator and bombardier of a real B-17 had many challenges also, but again, these physical challenges are not simulated at all in the game. The only real decisions to be made are which machineguns to fire at which enemy fighters, and there is often little real decision making even in this. The game is more of an effects simulator, in that a variety of random events and aircraft damage are simulated through the tables and dice rolls, but the player is generally simply a spectator to the events of the game.

Tokyo Express, on the other hand, had a well-designed solitaire system.

In TOKYO EXPRESS, the solitaire player represents a U.S. admiral...The game was designed to make the player experience the suspense, uncertainty and confusion of command in a night surface action. No "hidden" paragraphs ae involved as with so many other solitaire games; the game is replayable again and again.

From Riding the Express: An Introduction to Tokyo Express by Jonathan Southard, Volume 25, Number 4, The General Magazine.

One disadvantage of solitaire games is that the player has few checks and balances on his understanding of the game rules. Given a lack of shared experience with a human opponent who is using and required to understand the same game rules, misinterpretations are more possible.

One of the things I dislike most is to find out that I've been playing a game incorrectly...It happened to me most recently playing RAID ON ST. NAZAIRE; I read the rules carefully (I thought) and then went through them again as I played my first game. Things went fine, but as the game progressed and I dove back into the rulebook to clear up certain questions, I began to discover that I hadn't been counting movement costs correctly, that I had allowed guns to fire that weren't supposed to, that German units that should have appeared automatically hadn't, and a few other things. It's my own fault. It's a solitaire game; who else can I blame?

From A Travel Guide to St. Nazaire: Your Very First Raid by Bob Proctor, Volume 24, Number 4, The General Magazine.

A drawback of solitaire game systems is the balance between immersion and replayability. Ambush! has much more detail in its game system, but also relies heavily on surprise, and hence replayability of individual missions is low. Other games like Tokyo Express or B-17 are infinitely replayable, but because of the dice-driven effects and opponent activation, the game is less immersive and does not sustain the average gamer's interest as long.

== Legacy ==
Although the number of board war games and publishers have dramatically increased since the wargaming hobby first gained popularity in the late 1970s and early 1980s, solitaire board wargaming has experienced the opposite trend during the same time period. Few solitaire titles have been released since the 1980s, perhaps a notable exception being Solitaire Advanced Squad Leader in 1995. The simulated opponent in SASL was created through tables and charts in a special chapter of the Advanced Squad Leader Rulebook.

Nonetheless, Omega Games has released a new, updated version of Ranger for 2005, along with the two original expansion kits (now merged into one).

There has also been a resurgence in Solitaire gaming over the past 10 years. There have been a number of newer games developed that are played only as a solitaire game or have a dedicated portion of the rules to be used in solitaire play.

For example, there have been a number of fantasy/sci-fi board games that play very well as one player games, even though they were also designed as multi-player games. These games include Dungeon Quest, Runebound, and Dungeon Twister 2.

There has also been a rise in cooperative games that are very playable as solitaire games, such as Pandemic, Arkham Horror and Vanished Planet.

The past few years have also seen a resurgence in solitaire war games that have new and innovative systems. These would include games such as Hornet Leader, RAF, Field Commander Rommel, Silent War, Struggle for the Galactic Empire, Where There is Discord, The Hunters: German U-Boats at War, and Ottoman Sunset.

This is by no means an exhaustive list. There are many more solitaire games that already exist and still more that are currently in production. This is somewhat surprising, given that such games theoretically should be easier to play on a computer. However, there is no substitute for the feel of the pieces and the view of the map provided in paper and chit games. In addition, the artificial intelligence in computer gaming is often lacking and not as challenging as a solitaire board game. This would should be counter intuitive, but nonetheless, it is often very true.
