= Ranger: Simulation of Modern Patrolling Operations =

2005 Edition of Ranger

Ranger: Simulation of Modern Patrolling Operations is a tactical solitaire board wargame released by Omega Games in 1984. It was billed as a "game of modern patrolling". The game was designed by Bill Gibbs, and focussed on contemporary small unit actions, placing the player in the position of a patrol leader.

== History ==
In the summer of 1983, US Army Captains Bill Gibbs and Mike Modica formed Omega Games in Columbus, Georgia, and explored the idea of starting a wargaming company. Of three titles they had designed (Carrier War, Ranger, and Main Battle Area), Ranger was selected to be the first release. The game was playtested by graduates of the US Army Ranger School's Infantry Officer's Advanced Course. Names of their friends were used as characters in the game, to add verisimilitude. The game was released in November 1983, and the initial print sold enough copies in military communities to warrant further production.

A Second Edition went into production in May 1984, with rewritten rules and graphics brought up to current wargame industry standards. Artwork delays, however, set the expected release of the second edition back to the autumn of 1984, but actually the game shipped in April 1985 to critical success. Omega Games went on to become a successful game company.

Several editions of the game were published, the 4th Edition was released in 1992.

== Description ==
From the Designer's Notes:

In designing Ranger, I have attempted to do two things. First, I wanted to give the wargamer a realistic simulation of Ranger operations. Second, I felt the need to keep the game playable. Most tactical games have hundreds of complicated rules to memorize, but bear no relation to actual field maneuvers ... Patrolling suits solitaire gaming fairly well. While conventional operations are the result of the efforts of numerous commanders and staff officers, patrols generally depend entirely on the patrol leader's actions ... I made every attempt to present the tactical situations as the patrol leader would experience them. I wanted the game system to avoid excessive administrative bookkeeping and rules memorization ... I tried to simulate patrolling from my own experiences and not be tied to more standard wargame conventions ... The element of chance throughout Ranger is by design. No patrol leader can control his environment. He can only plan for as many possibilities as he has time and be alert and prepared to implement these contingency plans if necessary. Even the most experienced player making all the correct decisions will occasionally be destroyed. Combat is always dangerous, but even more so when forward of friendly lines.

The overall context of the game - a speculative game (taking place two years in the future) dealing with a fictional setting - was given on the back of the box:

In late 1988, the President of the Central American Republic of Puerto Oro requested military intervention by U.S. Forces. Puerto Oro's Army was losing control of the countryside to communist rebels. For several years, the rebels had been held in check by the Government Forces. The rebels could not gain the wide spread [sic] popular support they needed.

On October 16, 1988, the Northern Province of Puerto Oro was invaded by the forces of Costa Verde. The neighbouring country had provided the rebels with both material support and sanctuary. The outnumbered Government Forces fought a valiant delaying action against the better equipped invaders, but could not halt their advance.

On October 19, 1988, a patrol from C. Co., 3rd Capital Battalion captured Colonel Yuki Kicharov, the first proof of actual Soviet support.

After consulting with congressional leaders and the joint chiefs of staff, the President of the United States ordered the deployment of the 82nd Airborne Division. 3 Battalion, 75th Infantry (Ranger) was deployed in support of the 18th Airborne Corps (Forward). The U.S. forces quickly stabilized the situation. Presently, the front lines are stable. The U.S. forces are expected to take the offensive as soon as deployment of the 7th Infantry Division and the remainder of the 18th Airborne Corps is completed.

== Game Components ==
- Rules of Play booklet
- Patrolling Tactics booklet
- Tactical Events booklet
- laminated game map 16" x 20"
- laminated Patrol Record Log
- plastic Tactical Template
- Glossary folder
- Combat Results Card
- Tactical Reference Card
- Extended Patrolling Card
- 18 Mission Cards
- 2 six-sided dice
- China (grease) pencil

== Game play ==
Ranger was compared to Special Forces by Fire & Movement Magazine:

Ranger is billed as the game of modern patrolling. You would expect it to capture these operations well. Actually it does. The emphasis is getting to the target and getting home again. Most of the actions are handled with an abstract combat system.

Ranger is not a traditional board game. It is a solitaire game that is played on a laminated map. There is no hexgrid, or counters. Play starts by selecting a mission. Then you have to plan and organize the mission. Factors under the player's control are the size of patrol (squad or platoon), the weapons carried, the composition of the squad, the infiltration and exfiltration routes, what areas of the planned mission will be rehearsed, and so on. Just about everything is under the player's control except the mission, the method of insertion, and availability of certain support ...

Once the mission is planned and rehearsed, it ... is resolved using a paragraph system. Since the situations are more generic and abstract, the system leads to more variability with replays. Many paragraphs can only be played once, and then you know the contents of the paragraphs and any replay is not very interesting ...

The actions at the target are abstracted so it is difficult to investigate various tactics for actually accomplishing a mission. This action is resolved by a die roll. So if you are trying to destroy some target, it is simply a die roll, modified by your preparations. In this regard, Ranger is not very exciting. It is also why the game works best as a solitaire system. If you want the excitement of stalking through a building looking for the hostages, then you need another game.

Ranger was similar to Ambush! in that it was paragraph driven; however the latter game included counters and did have the "excitement of stalking through a building looking for the hostages" (in fact, quite literally, since one of the missions in Move Out, an Ambush! add-on module, was to track down and rescue half the player's squad, who started the mission captured.) Ranger had a much more serious approach to the subject, and Rooker felt the game could even be considered a training aid for actual military patrolling due to its realism.

== Expansion Kits ==
=== AO Sierra ===
AO (Area of Operations) Sierra was released by Omega as an expansion to Ranger, and included two 11" x 17" laminated maps extending the original map of Ranger. In addition to new terrain adjacent to the original game's terrain, AO Sierra also featured new mission types.

Components

- Two 11" x 17" laminated maps
- 18 Mission Cards
- Extended Mission Card
- Two Play Aid Cards

=== AO Victor ===
AO (Area of Operations) Victor was an additional expansion to Ranger very similar to AO Sierra, and also included two 11" x 17" laminated maps extending the original map of Ranger as well as new mission types.

Game Components

- Two 11" x 17" laminated maps
- 18 Mission Cards
- Extended Mission Card
- Two Play Aid Cards

== Ranger ==
From Omega Games' website:

The classic solitaire wargame returns! Our first game and one of the biggest selling wargames of all time returns in an all new, revised 3000 Line edition completely updated with new weapons, equipment and tactics. The new maps are UV coated allowing the use of dry erase markers. Four versions of the game now allow patrolling in wooded, mountain, jungle and desert terrain. Face the challenge of planning and executing a Ranger patrol on the modern battlefield. Missions include squad reconnaissance or platoon ambush and raid patrols. Experience the actual decisions faced by today's U.S. Army Ranger. The first of these exciting solitaire games simulates operations in a jungle environment.

=== AO Sierra/AO Victor ===
The two expansion kits were eventually merged into one kit, and sold as a companion to the newer version of the original game in 2005.
