= 1985 in games =

This page lists board and card games, wargames, miniatures games, and tabletop role-playing games published in 1985. For video games, see 1985 in video gaming.

== Games released or invented in 1985 ==
- Trial of Strength
- Advanced Squad Leader
- Baston (French board game)
- DC Heroes (role-playing game)
- The Doctor Who Role Playing Game
- Dragon Warriors
- Judge Dredd: The Role-Playing Game
- Mekton (role-playing game)
- Mosby's Raiders
- Nil, le Jeu du Serpent (French role-playing game)
- Orient Express
- Pax Britannica
- Pendragon (role-playing game)
- Pictionary
- Rêve de Dragon (role-playing game)
- Spacemaster (role-playing game)
- Teenage Mutant Ninja Turtles & Other Strangeness (role-playing game)
- World in Flames

== Game awards given in 1985 ==
- Spiel des Jahres: Sherlock Holmes Consulting Detective

== Deaths ==
| Date | Name | Age | Notability |
|---|---|---|---|
| January 4 | Brian Horrocks | 89 | Designer of Combat board game |
| July 7 | John Scarne | 82 | Magician who also designed games |

== See also ==
- 1985 in video gaming
