= Ambush! =

Board game

Ambush! Boxtop

Ambush! is a man-to-man wargame developed by Avalon Hill. It was released under Avalon's Victory Games label and was developed by Eric Lee Smith and John Butterfield. It has been out of print since Avalon Hill was disbanded in 1998.

Ambush! was innovative when it was released in 1983 since it was exclusively designed for single player play. Up to that point, wargames generally required at least two players. This was necessary since a player always had to play and control the opponent. Ambush! solved this problem by having the game scenario itself control the opponent. It accomplished this via tables, charts and a "paragraph book" which the player referred to see how the opponent was reacting.

Having the scenario dictate the actions of the opponent had another advantage: perfectly hiding the enemy. In all previous board based wargames, chits or markers had to be placed on the board representing enemy units. Some chits contained question marks or otherwise hid what was actually on the space, but the opposing player knew where likely areas for the enemy were. With Ambush!, the enemy had no markers on the board at all until they became visible (usually by attacking the player).

One drawback of Ambush!'s design was that it was difficult for players to create their own scenarios. Since each scenario had its own complex set of charts and tables, each cross-referenced to sections in the paragraph book, creating a scenario for the game from scratch could be a daunting undertaking. Players, then, were usually required to purchase Avalon Hill's expansion modules in order to play additional scenarios.

Ambush! could also be played with more than one player, with players playing in different squads or controlling different soldiers.

== Expansions ==
Ambush! spawned several expansion modules:

- Move Out (1984)
- Purple Heart (1985)
- Silver Star (1987)

There was also a Japanese theatre version of Ambush! called Battle Hymn, which had one expansion module called Leatherneck.

Additionally, a solitaire game based on Ambush! called Open Fire! was released by Victory Games which put the player in command of US tanks in WW II. It was less successful and had a less elegant design.

There was, finally, a two-player version of Ambush! called Shell Shock released in 1990.

== Computer versions ==
There have been a number of literal translations of Ambush! to the computer, including a cyberbox module as well as at least one version for the VASSAL game engine.

== Reception ==
In 1984, Ambush! won the Origins Award for Best 20th Century Boardgame of 1983.

== Reviews ==
- Casus Belli #22 (Oct 1984)
- 1983 Games 100
- 1984 Games 100

== Legacy ==
While not the first boxed solitaire board wargame to be produced (Avalon Hill's B-17, Queen of the Skies had preceded it in 1983), Ambush! was probably the most successful. While the additional modules are testament to this successful design, the concept also appears to have been validated by Ambush!, as a fair number of other purpose-designed solitaire games (as opposed to two player games that "could" be played solitaire) followed it shortly after. These include:

- Tokyo Express (Victory Games, 1988)
- Open Fire (Victory Games, 1988)
- London's Burning (Avalon Hill, 1995) - a solitaire game of the Battle of Britain
- Solitaire Advanced Squad Leader (Avalon Hill, 1995)
