= Shell Shock! =

Wargame Adaptation

- Designers: Joseph Reiser
- Illustrators: Kathleen Kiefer; Ted Koller
- Publishers: Victory Games Inc.
- Publication: 1990; 35 years ago
- Genres: Strategy game
- Languages: English
- Players: 2
- Playing time: 240 minutes
- Age range: 12+

Shell Shock! is a man-to-man wargame published in 1990 by Avalon Hill under their label Victory Games. It is an adaptation of the popular Ambush! solitaire game that can be played by two people.

== Gameplay ==
Shell Shock! is set in Europe during World War II and players play as commanders of either Axis (German) or Allied troops (either American, British, or Soviet). Players choose the men, weapons, and equipment of their squadrons and purchase "Light" and "Heavy" supports to assist them in each of six missions with different objectives and intensities.

== Reception ==
Jonathan Turner reviewed Shell Shock! for Games International magazine, and gave it a rating of 1 out of 10 (a turkey), and stated that "Shell Shock is unfortunately just another example of a company messing around with a winning formula and ending up with a disappointment. This, coupled with the obviously rushed nature of the game, and its lack of coherent feel makes this a true turkey."
