= Dark Blades (play-by-mail game) =

Play-by-mail fantasy role-playing game

- Publishers: Adventure Simulations Games (US), Standard Games (UK)
- Years active: 1988 to unknown
- Genres: play-by-mail, fantasy
- Languages: English
- Playing time: unlimited (open ended)
- Materials required: Instructions, order sheets, turn results, paper, pencil
- Media type: Play-by-mail or email

Dark Blades is a computer moderated, fantasy play-by-mail game published by Adventure Simulations Games in the United States and Standard Games in the United Kingdom (UK).

== Publication history ==
Dark Blades was published by Standard Games in the UK. It was based on Standard Games' Dark Blades board game. It was one of the play-by-mail games represented at Origins Game Fair 1990.

== Gameplay ==
Dark Blades is a play-by-mail game in which the Isle of Labrynthia is the setting, and players are either human or mon-oger. It was a computer moderated, open-ended fantasy game. There were 100 players per game which occurred on the "island continent of Labrynthia, and around a mammoth race war between the Humans and the Mon-Ogres" a hybrid race of humans and ogres. The game's purpose was to be the first player to complete ten interim and a final task. Players could create characters choosing among ten races and then assigning them as a Trader or Warrior. Movement occurs on a hex map.

== Reception ==
Stewart Wieck reviewed Dark Blades in White Wolf No. 24 (Dec./Jan., 1990), rating it a 1 out of 5 and stated that "With the color box and map, this game looks nice, but it plays poorly. Because the turnsheets are messy with repetitious messages, I cannot even recommend this game to PBM newcomers despite the simple order structure and interesting setting.." Wayne reviewed the game in a 1988 issue of Computer and Video Games, praising the quality of the game materials including the cover artwork.

== See also ==
- List of play-by-mail games

== Bibliography ==
- Adventure Simulation Games (May–June 1991). "Dark Blades: A Living Adventure [Advertisement]". Paper Mayhem. No. 48. p. 26.
- Costello, Matthew J. (February 1990). "Neat Things". Isaac Asimov's Science Fiction Magazine. No. 153. p. 15.
- Editors (July 1988). "Dark Blades". Sinclair User. No. 76. p. 80.
- Editors (June 1988). "Post Haste: Dark Blades – A Living Adventure". The Games Machine. No. 7. p. 116.
- Editors (July 1988). "Post Haste: Dark Blades – A Living Adventure". The Games Machine. No. 8. p. 115.
- Editors (1988). "The Spokesmen Speak". Flagship. No. 18. p. 44.
- Wayne (May 1988). "Play By Mail". Computer and Video Games. No. 79. p. 94.
- Wieck, Stewart (December 1990 – January 1991). "PBM Corner". White Wolf Magazine. No. 24. p. 58.
