= Dark Blades =

Dark Blades is a medieval fantasy board wargame published in 1986 by Standard Games and Publications that is based on the Cry Havoc rules system.

== Gameplay ==
Dark Blades is a fantasy board wargame for beginners, based on system for the game Cry Havoc Set on the island of Labyrinthia, the game includes an account of the hero Dark Blades and his band of fellow adventurers, upon which the included scenarios and maps are based. Components include

- two hex maps: a river beside a watermill, and a natural amphitheatre called "The Arena"
- a map of the island of Labyrinthia, for campaign play
- more than 200 counters
- 24 spell cards
- a 40-page rulebook with 4 scenarios related to the story of Dark Blades
- 2 quick reference sheets
- a Beginner's Guide to wargaming
- 10-sided die
- a sheet with general introduction and background

== Publication history ==
Standard Games and Publications published the complex fantasy wargame Cry Havoc! in 1981, and over the next four years released a number of supplements and expansions including Samurai Blades, and Siege. In 1986, Standard published Dark Blades, designed by Chris Baylis and Andy McKay, as an introductory wargame for players new to the hobby.

Standard later published an expansion set for Dark Blades that included new rules, extra spell cards, terrain cut-outs, and over 20 scenarios, some of them requiring use of Standard's other Cry Havoc products.

== Reception ==
In the December 1986 edition of White Dwarf #84, Robert Neville called Dark Blades a good move towards "a good, simple beginner's fantasy board wargame." He thought the game was "fast and simple to play, but has enough flexibility to cope with sophisticated manoeuvers and combatants with special powers." His one complaint about the game was how attached it was to the story about the hero Dark Blades, which he thought "drags the rest of the game with it [...] this game would be far more universal if the background wasn't there." He concluded that the game was "a good try but limited by a rather tacky background; but if you really can't wait for the real thing to come along this is for you."

== Reviews ==
- Isaac Asimov's Science Fiction Magazine
- Computer and Video Games
- Computer and Video Games
