= Additional Scenarios for the Game: Cry Havoc - Book 1 =

Tabletop game supplement

Additional Scenarios for the Game: Cry Havoc - Book 1 is an expansion published by Standard Games and Publications in 1984 for the medieval board wargame Cry Havoc.

== Gameplay ==
Additional Scenarios for the Game: Cry Havoc - Book 1 is a booklet containing six scenarios that can be played using Cry Havoc designed by Allan Paul:

- The Battle of Little Wooton
- The Foraging Party
- The Knight Errant
- The Knight's Lady
- The Rescue
- Reconnaissance Patrol

The book also includes maps and pieces for each scenario, as well as rules for miniatures. The book suggests using 28 mm miniatures from Essex Miniatures for the combats.

== Publication history ==
Standard Games and Publications published the medieval board wargame Cry Havoc in 1980. The company then published two additional scenarios. Book 1, designed by Allan Paul, was released in 1984. Book 2 was published in 1986.

== Reception ==
In Issue 23 of Imagine, Mike Dean questioned why a Cry Havoc! player would need to purchase this instead of just designing their own scenarios, saying, "I do not see much need for such a product; I would expect that even players with only limited imagination are able to construct scenarios of this very ordinary standard." Dean was also dismissive of the miniatures tules, stating, "The only other point of interest is the mention of using metal figures for playing Cry Havoc and the recommendation of Essex Miniatures for this purpose. Surely if a player is going to buy figures he may as well buy a set of table-top rules to go with them."
