= The Tin Soldier =

Tabletop role-playing game company

The Tin Soldier is an English company that produces miniature figures for fantasy gaming and historical wargames.

== History ==
The Tin Soldier is one of the veterans of miniatures casting in England, having operated out of Southsea, Hants, for over twenty years. The company produces 25mm and 15mm figures in both Fantasy and historical ranges. It also operates in Australia via Essex Miniatures.

== Reception ==
Ian Knight reviewed Tin Soldier for Imagine magazine, and stated that "Generally, the standard of sculpting is high, and the casting definition crisp."
