= Man-to-man wargame =

Genre of tabletop wargames

A man-to-man wargame (also known as a skirmish wargame) is a wargame in which units generally represent single individuals or weapons systems, and are rated not only on weaponry but may also be rated on such facets as morale, perception, skill-at-arms, etc. The game is designed so that a knowledge of military tactics, especially at the small unit or squad level, will facilitate successful gameplay. Man-to-man wargames offer an extreme challenge to the designer, as fewer variables or characteristics inherent in the units being simulated are directly quantifiable. Modern commercial board wargaming stayed away from man-to-man subjects for many years, though once the initial attempts were made to address the subject, it has evolved into a popular topic among wargamers.

Man-to-man wargames have been a popular pastime for PC and console gamers, though "true" man-to-man combat simulators are much more rare than action-adventure oriented first person shooters. Early role-playing games were derived from skirmish wargames, and many are still played as such. Many early designs for man-to-man games had cumbersome pre-plotting of moves, others used a system of multiple maps and umpires to try to create "fog of war" or uncertainty for players. Modeling conflict at this scale provides unique challenges to the game designer, who must find a way to quantify variables such as human behaviour at an individual level; games at higher (grand strategic, strategic, operational or tactical) levels can arguably have their variables more easily quantified.

== List of wargames ==
Below is a list of man-to-man wargames in the order in which they were introduced.

- Western Gunfight Wargame Rules 1st Ed (Steve Curtis, Ian Colwill, Mike Blake 1970. 2nd Ed 1971)
  - Old West Skirmish Rules 1816-1900 (Skirmish Wargames ((Ian Colwill, Mike Blake)), 1974. US Ed 1975. Revised Ed. 1978)
- Chainmail (Gary Gygax and Jeff Perren, 1971)
- Colonial Skirmish Wargames Rules c1850-1900 (Mike Blake, Steve Curtis, Ian Colwill, Ted Herbert, 1972)
- Sniper! (SPI, 1973. 2nd ed TSR, Inc. 1987)
  - Patrol (SPI, 1973)
  - Hetzer (TSR, Inc., 1988)
  - Special Forces (TSR, Inc., 1988)
- Skirmish Wargaming (Donald Featherstone, 1975)
- Melee (Metagaming, 1977. 2nd Ed. Steve Jackson Games 2018)
- Once Upon a Time in the West: Rules for Gunfight Wargames (Ian S. Beck and John D. Spencer, 1978)
- Snapshot (Game Designers' Workshop, 1979)
- City-Fight (SPI, 1979)
- Commando (SPI, 1979)
- Time Tripper (SPI, 1980)
- Flintlock & Ramrod 1700-1850 Skirmish Wargames Rules (Skirmish Wargames((Ian Colwill, Mike Blake)), 1980)
- Asteroid (Game Designers' Workshop, 1980)
- Azhanti High Lightning (Game Designers' Workshop, 1980)
- Twentieth Century Skirmish Wargames Rules Vol 1 Rules, Vol 2 Supplement, Vol 3 Tables & Charts (Skirmish Wargames ((Colwill, Grainger & Swan), 1981)
- Gladiator (Avalon Hill, 1981)
- Trenchfoot (Game Designers' Workshop, 1981)
- Cry Havoc! (Standard Games, 1981)
  - Siege (Standard Games, 1983)
  - Samurai Blades (Standard Games, 1984)
  - Outremer (Standard Games, 1985)
  - Dark Blades (Standard Games, 1986)
  - Viking Raiders (Standard Games, 1987)
- Up Front (Avalon Hill, 1983)
  - Banzai (Avalon Hill, 1984)
  - Desert War (Avalon Hill, 1985)
- Gunslinger (Avalon Hill, 1983)
- Close Assault (Yaquinto, 1983)
  - Firepower (Avalon Hill, 1984)
- Ambush! (Victory Games, 1983)
  - Move Out (Ambush! module) (Victory Games, 1984)
  - Purple Heart (Ambush! module) (Victory Games, 1985)
  - Silver Star (Ambush! module) (Victory Games, 1987)
  - Battle Hymn (Victory Games, 1986)
  - Leatherneck (Battle Hymn module)(Victory Games, 1988)
  - Shell Shock (Victory Games, 1990)
- Battle Cry (3W, 1986)
- Platoon (Avalon Hill, 1986)
- Soldiers (West End, 1987)
- Warhammer 40,000: Rogue Trader (Games Workshop, 1987)
- Iron Cross (Strategy & Tactics Magazine, 1990)
- Dragon Noir 2 - The Challenge (Eurogames, 1993)
- Special Forces (Dan Verssen Games, 2005) - a VASSAL-only card game also available as a .pdf download.
- Song of Blades and Heroes (Ganesha Games, 2007)
- Whack & Slaughter (CatZeyeS Entertainment, 2010)
- Deadzone (2012)
- Skirmish Tactics Apocalypse (2013)
- Warhammer 40,000: Kill Team (Games Workshop, 2013)
- Spectre: Operations (Spectre Miniatures, 2016)
- Black Powder Red Earth 28mm (Black Powder Red Earth and Echelon Software, 2021)

Some of these games represent further development of earlier titles; for example Firepower is a modern-set version of Close Assault, which is set in World War II, both from the same designer.

Ambush! is an innovative solitaire game based on a system of paragraph readings and a sleeve-and-card system that reveals data about the game environment as the player navigates his soldiers over the map. Set in the European Theatre of Operations in WW II, it spawned three sequels as well as a second series of games set in the Pacific (Battle Hymn) as well as a two-player version (Shell Shock).

Up Front is a man-to-man game, but its board was abstracted with the concept of relative range and range chits. The game was driven by cards, with individual soldiers represented by cards laid on a playing surface.

Firepower was arguably the most detailed man-to-man treatment; there were, for example, arrow counters to indicate which side of a tree a soldier might be lying behind.

== Miniature figurines and miniature scenery manufacturers ==
- JR Miniatures
- Peter Pig
- Miniature Building Authority
- Deimos Design Studio
- Battlestations
- Brigade Models
- Combat Wombat
- Critical Mass Games
- DLD Productions
- Eureka Miniatures
- Force XXI Miniatures
- GZG (Ground Zero Games)
- Highlander Studios
- HOF (15mm.co.uk)
- Irregular Miniatures
- Khurasan Miniatures
- Kremlin Miniatures
- Laserburn (15mm.co.uk)
- LKM Direct (QRF)
- Moonfleet Miniatures (ex Peter Pig Sci Fi)
- Old Crow Models
- Pendraken Miniatures
- Pole Bitwy
- Rebel Miniatures
- Splintered Light Miniatures
- Spriggan Miniatures
- Stan Johansen Miniatures
- Team Frog (Critter Commandos)
- The Scene
- Tinywargames
- Topgun Marketing (Grav Armour)
- Zombiesmith (Aphids) oh and Quar

== Computer games ==
True "man-to-man" games on the computer are rare, unless one counts first-person shooters (FPS). Most FPS games, such as Medal of Honor or Call of Duty, are not realistic simulations mainly due to the maze-like environment, scripted storyline, and unrealistic casualty assessment. The focus of these games is individual action-adventure rather than simulation in a dynamic tactical environment.

More realistic man-to-man "shooters" for the computer are known as tactical shooters; an example is Operation Flashpoint: Cold War Crisis. OFP and its sequels allow the player to give limited tactical commands to an entire squad of men while still engaged in a first person perspective, and in online play several dozen players could take on individual personas in various small-unit missions. Fatal and non-fatal wounds to the player's character were realistically implemented. While storylines were still heavily scripted for solo play, this actually increased the level of realism in the simulation.

Third-person man-to-man games have not been successfully translated to the computer in any large numbers. They include third-person shooters and tactical role-playing games.

Notable examples of third-person man-to-man games on the computer include:

- Sniper! (CompuServe, late 1980s) - a computer version of the boardgame, found on CompuServe.
- Avalon Hill's Squad Leader (MicroProse, 2000) - based on Soldiers at War, Jagged Alliance, and X-COM, this was a man-to-man game with true fidelity to man-to-man board wargaming, being turn-based.
- Silent Storm (Nival Interactive, 2003)
- GI Combat (Freedom Games, 2002)
- Eric Young's Squad Assault (Matrix Games, 2003) - a rework of the unsuccessful GI Combat by the same developer.
- Computer Ambush (SSI, 1984) - The game came with two laminated village maps for players to plot moves on. Each unit was a single soldier. Players would take turns giving their soldiers orders, then the computer would process the moves and display the results to each player before they could enter their next set of orders.
