= Outremer (wargame) =

Board wargame

Cover art by Peter Dennis

Outremer is a board wargame published by Standard Games in 1987 that simulates personal combat during the medieval Crusades, using a system of rules developed for a previous game, Cry Havoc.

== Background ==
Outremer (French: "Overseas") refers to the kingdom of four feudal states established by European powers in the Levant after the First Crusade around 1100 CE.

== Description ==
Outremer is a tactical board wargame of personal combat for two or more players in which one side controls one or more Crusader knights, and the other side controls opposing Saracens.

The rule system was first developed for a previous game published by Standard Games, Cry Havoc, although Outremer includes several revisions and improvements to the rule set.

The game box includes a historical map of the Levant, two hex grid maps on a tactical scale to be used for combat, and several hundred paper counters representing individual fighters. Each fighter has four counters representing the character with full health, wounded, stunned and dead.

=== Scenarios ===
Rather than including predetermined scenarios in the game box, Outremer uses a scenario generation system.

== Publication history ==
The Cry Havoc system was designed by Gary Chalk and published by the British company Standard Games in 1981. This was followed by Siege (1983), which added rules for castle and town sieges; a medieval Japanese expansion, Samurai Blades (1984); and Outremer in 1985, which featured cover art by Peter Dennis.

Jeux Rexton and then Eurogames published a French-language edition of Outremer.

== Reception ==
In Issue 85 of Dragon, Ken Rolston liked the Cry Havoc system, saying, "The presentation is superb in every way, with the possible exception of the thin cardboard the counters are printed on. The rules are clear and unambiguous ... The value of is in the beauty of its presentation, the charm of its medieval atmosphere, and the appeal of its simple mass combat systems."

In Issue 27 of Fire & Movement, Peter Hatton commented, "Strikingly beautiful graphics characterize this game of man-to-man combat ... a kit no medieval warrior should be without."

In a retrospective review in Issue 21 of Simulacrum, Joe Scoleri noted, "The Cry Havoc series is a set of colorful and fast moving games in which large doses of Hollywood and heroism take precedence over strict historical accuracy ... The counters and the maps immediately distinguish the series with their stellar artwork."
