= Bug Hunter =

Bug Hunter may refer to:

== People ==
- Bug hunter or exteriminator, a person who hunts and kills bugs for pest control
- Bug hunter, a person employed to hunt down bug (engineering)
- Bug hunter or debugger, a person who performs debugging
- Bug hunter or field research entomologist, a person who studies bugs in the wild

== Arts, entertainment, media ==
- Bug Hunter (game), a science fiction combat board game published by TSR in 1988
- Bug Hunter (band), a U.S. rock band formed in Seattle, Washington
- "Bug Hunter", an episode of the 2000s animated TV show The Boy
- Bug Hunter, a game developed for the 2024 Video game compilation UFO 50

== Other uses ==
- "Bug Hunter", the codename for the 2004 editions of the Debian-based Linux distribution Kanotix

== See also ==
- Exterminator (disambiguation)
- Hunter (disambiguation)
- Bug (disambiguation)
