= Patrol (board game) =

Board wargame

Box cover, SPI edition, 1974

Patrol, subtitled "Man to Man Combat in the 20th Century", is a skirmish-level board wargame published by Simulations Publications Inc. (SPI) in 1974 as a sequel to Sniper!, which had been released the previous year. Whereas Sniper! was set in urban environments during the Second World War, Patrol is set in a non-urban environment, in various conflicts ranging from 1914 to 1970.

== Description ==
Patrol is a two-player game that aims to simulate small-scale non-urban combat at the individual soldier level, set in various time periods from World War I to 1970. The players each control 5–15 soldiers in scenarios representing real-time combat encounters of 1–5 minutes, with each game turn representing between 5 seconds and 5 minutes.

=== Components ===
The game includes:

- six 9 in × 9 in (230 mm × 230 mm) geomorphic paper maps, scaled at 5 meters (5.4 yards) per hex
- 400 double-sided die-cut counters
- 32-page rulebook
- four player aid cards
- two 6-sided dice

=== Gameplay ===
==== Movement Points ====
Each counter, usually representing an individual soldier, has 10 Movement Points (MP) per turn. At the start of each turn, each player secretly "buys" actions for each counter up to the 10 MP limit. Moving a unit uses 1 MP per hex of plain terrain; other terrain has a higher MP cost. Actions such as standing up or throwing a grenade each use 5 MP. Firing a weapon or reloading a weapon uses all 10 MP.

==== Panic ====
After the actions for each counter have been purchased, each player checks units for panic. Those that are panicked will do nothing or move randomly.

==== Actions ====
All remaining actions are performed simultaneously in three phases: combat, movement, and finally grenades and artillery.

== Publication history ==
In 1973, SPI game designer Jim Dunnigan created a small-scale "man-to-man" wargame set in World War II that was published as Sniper!. The game was significant for being the first commercial tactical board wargaming treatment of man-to-man combat in the Second World War.

The following year, Dunnigan designed a companion game using the same basic rules titled Patrol that expanded the timeline of scenarios to include the period of World War I to 1970, and introduced rules for the arms and transportation used at various times during that period. Dunnigan called it a "rural version of Sniper!".

Following TSR's purchase of SPI in 1982, TSR assigned game designer Steve Winter to combine the two games into a single product. This was released in 1986 as Sniper!, subtitled "Second Edition: Game of Man-to-Man Combat, 1941-90". The expanded game removes the pre-World War II scenarios that had been published in Patrol, but extends the modern-day scenarios from 1970 to 1990. The new boxed set features artwork and cartography by Linda Bakk, Doug Chaffee, Tom Darden, Kim Lindau, Rodger B. MacGowan, and Colleen O'Malley.

Game components of this combined edition include:

- two 22 in × 34 in (560 mm × 860 mm) paper maps (double sided, with urban terrain on one side and rural terrain on the other, to allow for "double-blind" play with an umpire)
- 32-page rulebook divided into Basic, Intermediate, Advanced, and Optional rules
- cardstock sheet of vehicles
- two six-sided dice
- plastic counter tray
- 600 die-cut counters.

In an article in May-June 1988 edition of The Wargamer about the development of the game, designer Steve Winter commented, "When I first started revising the Sniper! and Patrol games in 1985, there were only two other wargames (that I am aware of) that covered modern combat at man-to-man scale. Since then, at least three more have been published (two of which, like the Sniper! game, were based heavily on previously published games). Yet, despite this surge of man-to-man games, very few articles have been published about any of them."

== Reception ==
In his 1977 book The Comprehensive Guide to Board Wargaming, Nicholas Palmer highlighted the "Brisk scenarios, with the flavour of man-to-man fighting quite well reflected, as the players agonize over whether to try and pin the enemy down or make a rush for it, whether to concentrate the squad or spread them out, and over the possible enemy plans."

In Issue #21 of Phoenix, Geoff Barnard noted that both Sniper! and Patrol are "primarily concerned with technology" rather than playability. Barnard liked the detailed maps that are used in Sniper!, but felt the move to non-urban settings in Patrol negated this advantage, saying, "unfortunately in doing so the idea of a detailed map was lost." He also felt that the "panic rule" introduced too much of a random factor, commenting, "the weird panic/preservation rules cause aberrant as well as logical things to happen — as the random dice rolls decree."

Rodger MacGowan for Fire & Movement said "Since combat in Vietnam was so personalized, Patrol! helps one visualize the horror of being caught in a lush, green hell, not knowing who or what is behind the next bush or tree. It should be in your Vietnam War game library."

In Issue 28 of Moves, Jon-Dane Lukas recalled that Squad Tactical Training had been his favorite course during his time in the U.S. Army, calling it "the highest expression of the infantryman's art." He went on to say that "Patrol! [...] seems to express that art in a clear and precise manner, as well as being quite realistic."

Eric Lawson for The Wargamer said "Patrol! does well generally as a game of man-to-man level combat in the 20th century. The variety of situations described from a Cossack raid in the Russian Civil War to an Ambush in Vietnam make it well worthwhile. Unfortunately, the choices of scenarios for World War I are weak and unimaginative, but the tools are there for creating something more interesting."

In The Guide to Simulations/Games for Education and Training, Martin Campion commented, "Like Sniper, this is a convincing and gripping simulation of situations that are often simulated in the cinemas and on television."

== Other reviews ==
- Strategy & Tactics #45
