= London's Burning =

London's Burning may refer to:

- "London's Burning" (round), a nursery rhyme derived from the Great Fire of London
- "London's Burning" (The Clash song), a song by the Clash
- London's Burning (film), a 2011 British television film
- London's Burning (TV series), a television series about fire fighters in London
- London's Burning (audio drama), based on the American television series Dark Shadows
- London's Burning (game), a World War II-based board game
- London Burning: Portraits from a Creative City, a 2015 photography book

== See also ==
- Great Fire of London, the historical 1666 fire
