= Sniper! (video game) =

1989 video game

- Platform(s): CompuServe
- Genre(s): Strategy war-game

Sniper! is a computer game that appeared on CompuServe. It was an adaptation of the Sniper! board game.

== Plot ==
Sniper! is a strategy war-game in which players begin as recruits in the Sniper Saloon & Salad Bar, where players can hear local gossip, and talk with other players about their wins defeats, challenge other players to a game of Sniper!, or play against the computer. A drill instructor in the Bootcamp to shows new players how to play. The Halls of Fame also display the best scores of players. The player commands a small squad of either German or American soldiers in the western Europe of World War II. In a game of Patrol the opposing Alpha and Bravo squads encounter each other in the area between their front lines. In a game of Infiltrate, the Alpha force has to sneak across the map from one side to the other, exiting at the Bravo side Victory Point area before Bravo can stop them.

== Development ==
Steve Estvanik converted the Sniper! board-game series from TSR to function as a multi-player computer game available to play online on CompuServe.

== Reception ==
In the July 1989 edition of Computer Gaming World, Johnny Wilson gave the Sniper! videogame a generally positive review, admiring it both as a social experience as well as a competitive game.

In the January 1993 issue of Compute! (Issue 148), Paul C. Schuytema reviewed the Sniper! computer game, and suggested players pay for the graphical version rather than try to decipher images composed of ASCII characters, which he found "far too cryptic for my tastes." He noted that although "the game's control logistics seem a little obtuse at first, you can enter a modified boot camp where you explore all of the various commands."
