= Ambush!: Purple Heart =

Solitaire World War II board wargame

Purple Heart
- Designers: Joseph Reiser
- Illustrators: Rosaria Baldari; Ted Koller; James Talbot
- Publishers: Victory Games
- Publication: 1985
- Genres: World War II

Ambush!: Purple Heart is a 1985 expansion of the solitaire tactical World War II board wargame Ambush! published by Victory Games .

== Description ==
Ambush!: Purple Heart is an expansion of Ambush! where the single player controls a small squad of American soldiers who are fighting German forces in 1944–45.

Purple Heart adds six new scenarios and three new maps. The original Ambush! scenarios were all set in northern France; the new scenarios include two more locations in northern France — Caen following D-Day and the Ardennes during Battle of the Bulge — but add locations in the Rhone Valley in southeastern France, and in western Germany. The three new maps include a French chateau and vineyard; a section of coastline with naval depot, docks, wharves and storage tanks; and an urban area of alleys and multi-level buildings.

As with the original game, these new scenarios are linked chronologically, and are meant to be played in order.

The game box also includes

- 108 new counters representing E-boats, Panzer tanks, motorcycles, half-tracks, Sherman tanks, and a complete train.
- 60 vehicle and character cards
- 13 mission cards
- 32-page rule and paragraph book that contain new rules and errata, including vineyards, submarine pens, alley hexes, and how tanks can push vehicles out of the way.

The original Ambush! game is required for play.

=== Gameplay ===
As with adventure gamebooks, the player begins by reading an introductory paragraph in the scenario book, and then is given several options. Each choice will send the player to a different numbered paragraph, which eventually will lead to combat, although various decisions that are made will dictate the time and place, and the number of opponents and their armaments.

Players can replay each scenario to see how making different decisions at certain junctures might to different tactics, changed set-ups, and even different squad equipment. As critic Nigel Slater noted, "Expecting the same thing to happen [during replays] can lead to heavy casualties."

== Publication history ==
Although previous solitaire wargames by various publishers had been marketing failures, Ambush!, published by Victory Games in 1983, proved to be the exception, and led to two expansions: Move Out!(1984), and Purple Heart. The latter, designed by Joseph Reiser, with artwork by Rosaria Baldari, Ted Koller and James Talbot, was released in 1985.

The following year, Hobby Japan published a Japanese version.

== Reception ==
Nigel Slater, writing for the Australian game magazine Breakout!, commented, "If you liked Ambush!, you will definitely want to play Purple Heart!"

In Issue 26 of the French games magazine Casus Belli, Hervé Hatt was highly enthusiastic about Purple Heart, although the first scenario he tried had ended badly. Hatt warned that it was a complex game requiring a careful read of the rules, and concluded, "Frankly, you're going to have to bring out your best men and send them into the meat grinder. We'll probably end up attacking Panzers with teaspoons. For hardened veterans only."
