= Orient Express (board game) =

Crime fiction board game

- Other names: Tatort: Nachtexpress; Orientekspressen
- Designers: Jeff Smets
- Publishers: Jumbo; Just Games
- Players: 1 to 6
- Setup time: 5 minutes
- Playing time: 2 hours
- Chance: Low
- Age range: 10 and up
- Skills: Deduction dice rolling

Orient Express is a crime fiction board game published by Jumbo and Just Games, released in 1985. The game is based on the 1934 novel Murder on the Orient Express by Agatha Christie. The game was designed by Jeff Smets and R. Wayne Schmittberger. The game contains 10 different murder cases, each of which can be played only once. Five new plots were released in 1987.

== Development ==
The board game was first released in 1985 by Just Games and by Jumbo in 1986. The game has been translated into numerous languages, e.g. English, German, Dutch, Italian, French, Spanish, Swedish, Finnish and Danish.

== Gameplay ==
The game is set on the train Orient Express, going from Paris to Istanbul. The players choose one case among the 10 possible cases. On each case a murder has been committed by one or more of the 8 suspects on the train. The suspects are handily named so that the first letter of each forms a successive list of the first eight letters of the alphabet: the actress, the baroness, the count, the diplomat, the entrepreneur, the fortuneteller, the gambler, and the heiress. It is up to the players to solve the mystery before the train reaches Istanbul and the murderer gets away. Prejudices such as gamblers aren't law-abiding, fortunetellers lie, colonels are armed with guns, etc., must be set aside. It is possible that more than one suspect is guilty.

Another aspect of the solution: players must identify the motive behind the murder. Possible motives: blackmail, espionage, insanity, jealousy, money, and revenge.

The players start in the middle of the train and move around in the two train wagons according to dice rolls. By moving through the train players are able to get clues about the characters by talking to the innocent crew on board or examining the rooms. The suspects can also be interrogated - they never lie but they might be telling useless information. In practice text cards represent the staff, the suspects and the rooms.

An engine pawn is moved one station every time the specialized die shows a green figure. The detectives receive a telegram about one of the suspects or the victim on certain train stations.

When the train stops at Istanbul each player must announce their solution of the murder. The player with the correct solution wins.

== Critical reception ==
=== Awards ===
Awarded winner of the 1987 "Beautiful Game" by "Spiel des Jahres". Awarded winner of the 1987 "Best Family Game" by "Årets Spel".

=== Reviews ===
- Jeux & Stratégie #45
- 1985 Games 100
