= Cry Havoc (1981 board game) =

Board game published in 1981

Cry Havoc is a board wargame published by Standard Games and Publications in 1981 that uses a complex set of rules to simulate medieval one-on-one combat.

== Description ==
Cry Havoc is a two-player wargame with a medieval setting. Several scenarios are included in the game that set up a variety of combatants on each side, including peasants, sergeants, billmen, men-at-arms, knights and various other "character" classes. For example, in the scenario called "Peasant Revolt", 11 peasants, 19 yeoman and six pack mules are arrayed against 13 mounted and heavily armoured knights.

The game comes with two colour maps, three rulebooks, and 228 counters printed on thin cardstock.

== Publication history ==
The Cry Havoc system was designed by Gary Chalk and published by the British game company Standard Games in 1981. Standard used the same combat system in several game expansions:

- 1983: Siege (addition of siege rules)
- 1984: Samurai Blades (warfare in medieval Japan)
- 1985: Outremer (the Crusades, featuring expanded rules)
- 1987: Viking Raiders (Vikings against Anglo-Saxons)

Standard also published two scenario books for Cry Havoc, with Book 1 published in 1984 and Book 2' in 1986, and maps for medieval towns and castles. The same combat rules system was used in a fantasy setting titled Dark Blades.

Jeux Rexton and then Eurogames published French-language editions of Cry Havoc as well as some of the expansions.

== Reception ==
In the May 1984 edition of Dragon (Issue 85), Ken Rolston was impressed with the quality of the maps, with the concise and well-written rulebooks, and the simplicity of the combat system. His only minor caveat was that the counters were too thin to be easily picked up. Rolston highly recommended it, saying, "Cry Havoc is easy to learn and simple to play... The rules are clear and unambiguous, and the scenarios are varied and dramatic... The value of Cry Havoc is in the beauty of its presentation, the charm of its medieval atmosphere, and the appeal of its simple mass combat systems.

In the November-December 1984 edition of Space Gamer (Issue No. 71), Craig Sheeley also gave a thumbs up, saying, "Cry Havoc is superb, a wonderful thumbnail sketch of medieval combat. Gamers interested in FRPGs will find it a useful aid, especially the maps."

In the December 1984 issue of Casus Belli (Issue #23), Patrick Giacomini reviewed the Siege expansion, which he said had a far superior set of rules that were "consistent and (relatively) precise" compared to the original Cry Havoc! game. Although he admired the cover artwork, he criticized the box design, calling it too thin and too large, saying, "They often arrived slightly crushed, fortunately without damage to the components inside." He also pointed out that the two small plastic ziplocks included for storage were far too small for the 200 counters in the game. Overall, Giacomini thought the game covered a grey area between wargames and role-playing games, pointing out that in addition to being a "pleasant wargame", this game provided opportunities for "Personalization of leaders, diplomatic evolution [and] introduction of adventurers into medieval conflicts."

In a retrospective review in Issue 6 of Simulacrum, Joe Scoleri noted that "Despite what it says on the box, Cry Havoc is anything but a 'simulation' of medieval combat. The game compares to medieval combat in the same way Victory Games' Ambush compares to WWII — large doses of Hollywood and heroism are emphasized over history." However, Scoleri felt that the game's sense of style compensated for this, and concluded, "After you've had a taste of the components, game play and scenarios, chances are you'll be having too much fun to be bothered by realism issues."

== Other reviews and commentary ==
- The V.I.P. of Gaming Magazine #3 (April/May, 1986)
- Jeux & Stratégie #31
- Computer and Video Games
- G.M. The Independent Fantasy Roleplaying Magazine #1
