= Mosby's Raiders (game) =

Solitaire board wargame

Mosby's Raiders is a solitaire board wargame based upon a Confederate partisan ranger unit led by famed Colonel John S. Mosby during the American Civil War. The game was developed by Eric Lee Smith and published by Avalon Hill subsidiary Victory Games in 1985.

Smith looked for a situation that had historical information he could work into the game play, and his research led him to the partisan activities of Confederate cavalry against Federal troops and supply lines in Northern Virginia (AKA "Mosby's Confederacy") between 1862 and 1864.

The solitary player assumes the role of Colonel Mosby. He selects targets for raids from those presented on the map (such as supply depots, rail lines and bridges) and from random historical targets presented by cards that are drawn at the beginning of each turn. Mosby is aided by historical elements shown on cards that are drawn according to a formula that depends on his notoriety from previous successful raids. His ability to recruit additional raiders from local residents depends on his health, notoriety, and random Federal sweeps through the countryside. Victory is secured by continuing to score a pre-set number of notoriety and Federal awareness points by the end of a set number of turns.

The Federal army responds to these raids by being activated by Mosby's activities and moving towards the Raider marker by random throws of a die. The game succeeds in presenting the player with a sense of the limitations these early guerrillas faced, as well as their tactics such as "skedaddling" or scattering in the face of frequently superior forces. Ultimately, Mosby was fairly successful in attempting to slow supplies being delivered to Federal troops and occupy as many troops as possible that could have been used in offensive action against the Confederacy.

== Reviews ==
- The V.I.P. of Gaming Magazine #3 (April/May,, 1986)
- Games #76
