= Whack & Slaughter =

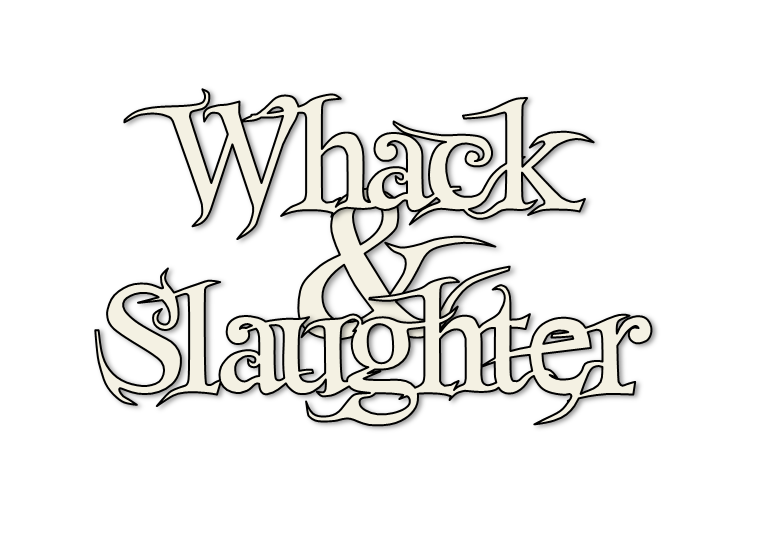
- Whack & Slaughter logo
- Designers: Kai Bettzieche
- Publishers: CatZeyeS Entertainment
- Publication: 2010 (First Run)
- Genres: Fantasy
- Systems: Wargaming
- Setup time: Usually 5-10 minutes.
- Playing time: Usually 30-60 minutes per match.
- Chance: Medium (dice rolling)
- Skills: Military strategy, arithmetic
- Website: www.catzeyes.de

Whack & Slaughter is a set of fantasy skirmishing game rules allowing players to play with all kinds of fantasy as well as pirate themed miniatures. It is meant to be played with as few as one miniature per player, allowing more players to play. Most scenarios are meant to be played with up to eight players forming two teams of four players (and thus four miniatures per team). In addition to a miniature (referred to as a Hero), a player needs a set of five dice as well as a "Hero Card" as a reference for the Hero's abilities.

== Background ==
The first run of rules was released in 2010 by Kai Bettzieche of CatZeyeS Entertainment. Though Whack & Slaughter is a tabletop game, it is inspired heavily by video games such as Guild Wars, Diablo and Torchlight. The game's name is an allusion and homage to the hack and slash video game genre.

== Gameplay ==
Similar to role playing games, before a game begins, players each create a Hero by buying levels in the traits defence, melee, ranged combat and magic. Depending on the choice of traits, a Hero gets access to a certain amount of skills. Currently there are 15 schools of skills available and, if a Hero uses only one or two traits, the Hero's owner may pick skills from up to two schools. Each school features 10 common skills as well as 5 elite skills (skills with superior effects). Only Heroes having specialized in one trait receive access to elite skills.

The five dice a player brings along not only serve as randomizers, but as life counters and a measurement of movement as well. Each time a Hero takes damage, it will become slower and less efficient. Gameplay takes place on comparatively small "maps" (a term derived from video game language), forcing the Heroes from the beginning into close quarter combat. A couple of scenarios are given in the rulebook, such as the classic "all vs. all" (also available as "team vs. team"), capture the flag, king of the hill (a variant of the classic game King of the Hill), bombing run, a treasure hunt and even a snowfall scenario allowing players to duke it out in a snowball fight. Also, players are encouraged to create their own custom scenarios.

== Releases ==
The following table lists the releases sorted by year

Year	Name	Type
2010	First Run	Core rules
2010	Christmas Carnage	Christmas expansion
2011	Crimson Tides	Rules to support pirate miniatures
2013	Whack & Slaughter Express	Express game with preconfigured Heroes and preconfigured map
2014	Living Rulebook	Revised core rules
