= Open Fire: Solitaire Tank Combat in WWII =

Solitaire board wargame

Cover art by James Talbot, 1988

Open Fire: Solitaire Tank Combat in WWII is a solitaire board wargame published by Victory Games in 1988.

== Description ==
Victory Games published Ambush!, a man-to-man combat wargame, in 1983 that used an innovative system of paragraphs and pre-programmed enemy responses to allow for solitaire play. Open Fire, a game of tank warfare set in World War II, uses the same game system. The player controls the Allied forces, while the game mechanics control the German forces.

=== Components ===
- 210 die-cut counters
- paper 22" x 32 " hex grid map scaled at 50 m (55 yd) per hex
- rules booklet
- paragraph booklet
- 79 unit characteristics cards
- mission cartridge and cartridge view sleeve
- platoon record sheet pad
- 8" x 22" display sheet
- two 10-sided dice (one blue, one white)
- counter storage tray

=== Setup ===
The player picks one of six scenarios and places specified event markers on the map. The player either generates a tank platoon with random die rolls or uses a pregenerated platoon, and then spends a specified number of quality points to upgrade men and tanks.

=== Gameplay ===
When the player moves a tank to a point on the map that has clear line of sight to an event marker, then the player uses the mission cartridge in the cartridge reader to see if there is a paragraph number. If there is, the player reads the relevant paragraph, which activates one or more German units. Once combat is finished, the player continues to the next event marker.

=== Victory conditions ===
Each scenario outlines how the player accumulates victory points, and how many points are required to declare victory.

== Publication history ==
In 1982, Simulations Publications, Inc. (SPI) ran into financial difficulties and was taken over by TSR. In the aftermath, many SPI staff members left or were let go. Rival game company Avalon Hill hired some of them, and formed them into a subsidiary, Victory Games. One of their releases, Open Fire, was designed by ex-SPI designer Gerard Christopher Klug, with cover art by James Talbot, and was published in 1988.

== Reception ==
In the inaugural issue of Games International, Brian Walker (with help from Derek Wilson and Ian Brown) had an overall favorable impression of the game, although he found the quality of the scenarios varied from mission to mission. He also questioned the relatively high price of the game versus its replayability once the player has finished the six scenarios. Walker found several errors and omissions in the rules, and pointed out that although most of the errors were minor, "for the price you would expect the rules to be a bit more polished and the missions to be a bit better thought out." He concluded by giving the game an average rating of 3 stars out of 5, saying, "The game should have some appeal to role-players because of the identification with characters, and if Victory could throw in a few tank-driving Orcs in the expansion modules then the sales potential of the game could know no bounds."

== Reviews ==
- Casus Belli #46 (Aug 1988)
- Best Games of 1988 in Games #94
