= Siege (board game) =

Board game

Siege is a 1984 board game published by Standard Games and Publications.

== Gameplay ==
Siege is an expansion for the game Cry Havoc, focusing on the conquest of castles.

== Reception ==
Mike Dean reviewed Siege for Imagine magazine, and stated that "Siege may seem a little overpriced, but it is an enjoyable game and would probably be a good investment for experienced Cry Havoc campaigner and complete novice alike."

Craig Sheeley reviewed Siege in Space Gamer No. 71. Sheeley commented that "Siege is well worth the money. The scale fits any 25mm miniature figures, the maps are invaluable, and the rules about taking castles are very useful."

In the December 1984 issue of Casus Belli (Issue #23), Patrick Giacomini thought Siege had a far superior set of rules that were "consistent and (relatively) precise" compared to the original Cry Havoc! game. Although he admired the cover artwork, he criticized the box design, calling it too thin and too large, saying, "They often arrived slightly crushed, fortunately without damage to the components inside." He also pointed out that the two small plastic ziplocks included for storage were far too small to hold the 200 counters in the game. Overall, Giacomini thought the game covered a grey area between wargames and role-playing games, pointing out that in addition to being a "pleasant wargame", this game provided opportunities for "Personalization of leaders, diplomatic evolution [and] introduction of adventurers into medieval conflicts."

== Reviews ==
- Jeux & Stratégie #31
- Space Voyager
