= Baston (game) =

Baston is a 1985 board game published by Jeux Actuels.

== Gameplay ==
Baston is a game in which a comedic skirmish board-wargame is set in a suburban French bar, where players control rowdy gangs battling with beer bottles and motorcycle chains.

== Reviews ==
- Casus Belli #31
- Jeux & Stratégie #35
