= B-17, Queen of the Skies =

1983 board game

Original On Target edition, 1981

B-17, Queen of the Skies is a solitaire board wargame published by On Target Games in 1981 that simulates flight missions in a Boeing B-17F Flying Fortress bomber during World War II. The game was acquired by Avalon Hill and republished in 1983.

== Background ==
In late 1942 and early 1943, before the advent of long-range fighter escorts such as the P-51 Mustang, B-17 bombers of the Eighth Air Force had to defend themselves from fierce German fighter attacks as they undertook long missions over northern Europe. Even flying in close formation for mutual protection and more concentrated bombing patterns, the threats of flak, bad weather and determined Luftwaffe attacks resulted in a low percentage of the bombs hitting the target, and a loss of many bombers.

== Description ==
B-17 is a solitaire board wargame in which the player controls a B-17 bomber on missions over Germany, France, Belgium and the Netherlands between November 1942 and May 1943. Mission targets, opposition fighters and flak are all determined randomly, as is damage done to the B-17. The player's role in the game is to allocate defensive fire from the multiple weapons positions on the bomber.

=== Components ===
The game features several boards: the game board, the strategic map of northern Europe, and the crew placement board. Other components include various tables and charts, 88 counters, 16 German fighter cards and a pad of mission charts.

=== Gameplay ===
The bomber board shows a plan layout of the aircraft. The player places the ten crew counters in the appropriate locations at the beginning of a mission. As enemy fighters attack, the player keeps track of damage to the plane and the crew, which can eliminate crew members and their commensurate abilities, reduce the efficiency of several systems, disable gun turrets, or even result in a cataclysmic explosion.

The strategic map is broken into zones. As the aircraft enters a new zone, the player rolls dice to determine what the bomber faces.

The game comes with 25 missions, which start at a relatively easy level, with short missions that include a fighter escort during the entire mission, and build up to very long and difficult missions with no fighter cover. The objective of the game is to complete all 25 missions with the same bomber and crew.

The rules also cover bail-outs, leaving the bomber formation, replacing a dead gunner with another crew member, forced landings on land and water, and variable enemy fighter attacks.

There are rules for a two-player game, where one player controls the bomber, and the other player controls the German air defenses.

Several variant aircraft were published in Avalon Hill's magazine The General, including the late-model Boeing B-17G Flying Fortress, the Consolidated B-24 Liberator, the RAF's Avro Lancaster and late-war Luftwaffe aircraft such as the Messerschmitt Me 262 and Me 163 jet aircraft.

Avalon Hill edition featuring cover art by Joe DeMarco, 1983

== Publication history ==
In 1981, Glen Frank developed a solitaire bombing game titled B-17, Queen of the Skies, which was published by On Target Games. Two years later, Avalon Hill bought the game, and Bruce Shelley did some minor modifications to a few rules. Avalon Hill published the game in 1983 with new cover art and a new map by Joe DeMarco.

== Reception ==
In Issue 17 of Imagine (August 1984), Don Turnbull liked the quality of components. He noted that although the game "relies on a host of charts, tables and die rolls to simulate the 'other side' and this can make a solitaire game mechanically rather a drudge; fortunately this is not the case here since, once the mechanics are understood, the game flows very well." He also pointed out that "solitaire players have no opponent to remind them of various stages in the procedure which they have, wittingly or otherwise, overlooked. The game might therefore become rather easier than intended if you forget to perform one of your opponent's activities from time to time." Turnbull suggested a check sheet would be useful to avoid this. He found "The mechanics are simple and relatively uncluttered, consistent with the need for solitaire play and, though there are a few so-called optional rules, they are neither particularly complex nor particularly long-winded." Turnbull concluded, "I can recommend this for a casual and not too serious diversion from more stressful games."

In Issue 30 of Fire & Movement, Ron Jongeling called the On Target edition "the solitaire player's dream come true. The price is steep, considering the small amount of components, but what the game lacks in physical content, it more than makes up for in enjoyment." He concluded, "In the 100+ missions I have flown so far, not one error and not one little glitch has surfaced from the rules."

In Issue 72 of Fire & Movement, Chris Perleberg reviewed the Avalon Hill edition and noted, "There's a lot of dice rolling, and there aren't a lot of decisions to be made by the player. Still, the game is habit forming, probably because you can make specific statements about it: 'Yeah, I took a flak hit over Antwerp that wounded my starboard waist gunner and knocked out my port inboard engine, so I had to ditch in France.' It feels real."

In a retrospective article in Issue 5 of Simulacrum, Joe Scoleri noted that differences in the rules between the On Target edition and the Avalon Hill edition were minimal, but conceded that "On Target's component quality is considerably lower." However, he liked On Target's counters better, which featured small illustrations, rather than the text-only counters in the Avalon Hill edition. He also noted that although Avalon Hill made improvements to the Attack Board and strategic map, "The biggest surprise is that [On Target's] superb artwork for the German aircraft cards was not an AH contribution. The illustrations descended virtually unchanged from the On Target edition!"

== More reviews and commentary ==
- The Grenadier #20 (January–February 1984)
- Battleplan #7 (August–September 1988)
- The Boardgamer, Special Issue dedicated to this game
- B-17 Queen of the Skies (base game and variant) Product Summary, Review on RPG.NET by a review maker Wes Johnson.
