= Nil, le Jeu du Serpent =

Nil, le Jeu du Serpent is a 1985 role-playing game published by La fondation des stratégies.

== Gameplay ==
Nil, le Jeu du Serpent is a game in which a turn-based role-playing and tactical game is set in a mythic Egypt torn by civil war, where player characters—starting as low-caste Egyptians—navigate diplomacy, resource management, and divine favor to rise in a socially stratified world governed by the Demiurge (gamemaster).

== Reviews ==
- Casus Belli #31
- Jeux & Stratégie #38
