= Bug Hunter (game) =

Board game

Bug Hunter is a science fiction combat board game published by TSR in 1988, using adaptions of rules from the previously released Sniper! board game.

== Publication history ==
In 1973, Simulations Publications Inc. (SPI) published a two-player combat game called Sniper! After TSR purchased SPI in 1982, TSR released an expanded edition of Sniper! in 1986, and followed up with three "companion games", the third one being Bug Hunter in 1988. Bug Hunter was designed by Steve Winter, with artwork and cartography by Kim Janke, Dennis Kauth, and David C. Sutherland III, and cover art by Keith Parkinson.

== Gameplay ==
Bug Hunter moved the combat setting out of the Second World War and onto distant planets, where humans are attacked by predatory aliens. Using the Sniper! rules set, the game focuses on "the popular science fiction theme of embattled humans threatened by vicious alien creatures in space and on the ground," with one player taking the human side, and the other player playing the aliens.

Components include:

- four double-sided isomorphic maps
- three rulebooks (original Sniper! rules, science fiction rules adaptations, scenarios)
- 400 die-cut counters
- fifty random event cards
- cardstock sheet of vehicle cutouts
- track/roster sheet
- cover folder, which included reference tables

== Reception ==
In the May 1989 edition of Games International, James Wallis reviewed Bug Hunter as the magazine's "Game of the Month", and found the amount of material included made for "a great deal of game by any standards." He found the hand-to-hand combat rules "simple and direct", and the rules overall "written in a clear style that explains everything while not being patronising or dull." He concluded by giving the game a perfect score of 5 out of 5, saying, "Bug Hunter is not without a few rough spots but [...] it is fast, fun and contains enough variables to keep players interested for some time."

In the March–April 1990 edition of Space Gamer/Fantasy Gamer (Issue No. 88), Tony Watson commented that "Anyone looking for an action-packed game, or who believed that there was a game somewhere in the Aliens movie, will find both right here."

== Reviews ==
- Casus Belli #52
