= Tokyo Express: The Guadalcanal Naval Campaign – 1942 =

1988 WWII naval wargame

Cover art by Ted Koller

Tokyo Express: The Guadalcanal Naval Campaign – 1942 is a solitaire board wargame published Victory Games in 1988.

== Background ==
During battles in New Guinea and the Solomon Islands in 1942 and 1943, Japan used Imperial Japanese Navy ships to deliver personnel, supplies, and equipment to Japanese forces. Due to American air superiority, the Japanese were forced to make their supply runs at night. The Americans eventually nicknamed these nocturnal resupply missions the "Tokyo Express," while the Japanese called them "Rat Transportation" (鼠輸送, nezumi yusō). The U.S. Navy sought to intercept these task forces, while the Japanese used superior night-time technology and their accurate Long Lance torpedoes to defend the convoys.

== Description ==
Tokyo Express is a solitaire game in which the player controls American forces off Guadalcanal, while the Japanese convoys, made up of a varying number of ships, act via a predetermined set of rules that use an element of randomness. The game also has rules for two players.

The game box includes 156 rectangular ship counters, 520 other counters and 120 artillery cards.

The basic game is explained in 24 pages of rules. Another 64 pages explain the standard and advanced solitaire games, as well as the two-player game. Eleven scenarios are included in the game: four historical and seven hypothetical. A scenario generation system is also included.

The stages of the game involve navigation while in formation, detection of enemy ships and combat with artillery and torpedoes.

== Publication history ==
In 1982, after the notable wargame publisher SPI was purchased by the game company TSR, SPI's longtime rival Avalon Hill hired away many of SPI's design staff and formed them into a subsidiary company, Victory Games. The new imprint immediately began to produce wargames, including 1988's Tokyo Express, a game designed by Jon Southard, with cover art by Ted Koller. A year after its American publication, the game was translated into French by Jeux Actuels and published in France.

== Reception ==
In Issue 4 of Games International, Mike Siggins found the amount of material facing the player upon opening the box to be "staggering ... The initial impression is one of overwhelming data." Despite this and the steep learning curve required for the advanced game, Siggins thought that "To my mind, this is exactly the level that solitaire game systems need to simulate and the basic Tokyo Express system does it rather well." However, Siggins found significant problems with the game, including a convoluted system for determining Japanese actions; and too many charts and tables for what was a fairly straightforward situation. For this reason, Siggins was ambivalent about this game, commenting, "In view of the rather expensive price tag and the hard work required, I remain doubtful of its overall merit." Siggins concluded by giving the game a rating of 3 out of 5, saying, "On balance, Tokyo Express is one for the hardened solitaire player with an interest in naval matters."

In Issue 56 of the French games magazine Jeux & Stratégie, Pierre Grumberg found that the solo game was too much work, since the single player had to not only handle the American forces, but also had to roll dice to determine the course settings for the Japanese task force, and also roll dice for the Japanese forces during combat. Grumberg also noted that the player had to make some decisions for the Japanese forces, presenting a dilemma: "either he plays badly and wins, or he plays well and wins too." Grumberg called the design of the solo game "laudable but unfortunately a bit useless." However, as a two-player game, Grumberg felt this game rose to a higher level. "Here, it's all about trickery, maneuvering and placement. Everything happens in a few seconds, and whoever hits first wins often victory ... As you will quickly understand, Tokyo Express is an exciting two-player game." Grumberg concluded by giving the two-player game a rating of 3 out of 4, but the solo game only 1 out of 4, saying, "This Tokyo Express really deserves two people to embark on it: alone, it's a bit... a hassle."

In Issue 50 of the French games magazine Casus Belli, Frank Stora warned "The rulebook is a bit thick and can be intimidating." However Stora liked the many "copiously illustrated examples — which makes the task of the novice admiral much easier." Stora admitted that chance played a significant part of this game, but pointed out "It is true that there are a lot of dice rolls and drawing of counters in this game. But the war at sea, at night in 1942, was often decided by luck. And how better to simulate chance than with a die, or with cards?" Stora noted a significant discrepancy in the rules, "which do not clearly indicate that American shots regulated by radar must always be considered as short range." Despite this, Stora concluded on a positive note, saying "Regretfully, the designers do not seem to want to generalize the system to other theaters of operations. In a word: an absolute must for naval wargaming enthusiasts."

Games included Tokyo Express in "The Year's Best Games." Matthew Costello and Scott Marley noted that many wargamers enjoyed playing their games solo, and pointed out that this game was "a complex simulation of the bloody Guadalcanal campaign in 1942, [and] is expressly designed to be played solitaire."

== Awards ==
Tokyo Express won the Charles S. Roberts Award for "Best World War Two Game of 1988".

== Other reviews ==
- Fire & Movement #67, 70
