= London's Burning (game) =

Board game first published by Avalon Hill in 1995

- Designers: Ben Knight
- Illustrators: Kurt Miller; Mark Simonitch; Rick Gondeck; Charles Kibler
- Publishers: Avalon Hill
- Publication: 1995
- Genres: World War II aviation combat

London's Burning is a solitaire board game published by Avalon Hill in 1995 that simulates the Battle of Britain.

== Description ==
London's Burning is a solitaire game in which the player controls one or two British fighters, and must take on a flight of 4–7 German airplanes, including Messerschmitt 109s and 110s, Junkers 88s and 87s, Heinkel 111s and Dornier 17s that approach London using pre-programmed moves.

=== Components ===
The game box includes a map of southern England scaled at 10 kilometres (6.2 mi) per hex, 190 counters, and a 24-page rulebook.

=== Gameplay ===
Each turn uses the following sequence:

1. Weather Determination Phase
2. 7 AM Phase:
  1. Active RAF pilots can stand by at the home airfield, transfer to an undamaged airfield or fly patrol over a target hex.
  2. Draw a raid counter, with possible results being "No Raid, "Remix", or "Raid".
    1. "No Raid": Move to the next Phase.
    2. "Remix": Return all counters to the container
    3. "Raid"
      1. RAF fighters may take off, move or change altitude
      2. If interception is successful, the composition of the German force is revealed and combat ensues.
      3. Combat sequence is repeated until German force returns to France.
3. 10 AM Phase: Repeat the 7 AM Phase procedure for each of the daytime phases
4. 2 PM Phase
5. 5 PM Phase
6. Night Phase: Destroyed air units may be replaced, bomb damage is repaired, and RAF pilots recover from fatigue.

The rules also cover sun position, height advantage, relative firepower, pilot quality, ammunition limits, barrage balloons, flak wounded pilots, bailing out, and inoperative radar stations.

=== Scenarios ===
There are three scenarios that all begin on 13 August 1940:

- Short (ends on 18 August)
- Regular (ends on S6 September)
- Long (ends on 15 September)

The daily sequence is repeated for each day of the scenario.

=== Rules for two players ===
There are rules for two players. Either the second player can take on the role of the German airplanes, or the second fighter can become another RAF pilot in a cooperative game (although the pilot with the best score at the end of the scenario wins.)

== Publication history ==
London's Burning was designed by Ben Knight and published by Avalon Hill in 1995

== Reception ==
In Issue 8 of Zone of Control, Dave Conn warned that "this game is not for all tastes" because of the scarcity of counters on the board. Conn wanted to like the game, but could not get over the fact that the entire Battle of Britain was represented by no more than nine counters at a time, noting "while London's Burning tells much about air combat during the battle, it imparts little of the sense of dread that must have pervaded RAF Fighter Command in July through September 1940." Conn concluded by giving this game grades of "Good" for gameplay and "Fair" for historicity, writing, "This is a good game by any standards. For those who seek innovation, something not yet tried,, and accept its limits willingly, London's Burning is very good indeed."

London's Burning was chosen for inclusion in the 2007 book Hobby Games: The 100 Best. Ted S. Raicer commented, "London's Burning has a lot more going for it as a wargame than just its subject matter — it is one of the most multifaceted and imaginative game designs in the 50-year history of commercial wargaming. It provides real insight into the historical events it portrays. And, oh yes, it's also a great deal of fun to play."
