= Essex Miniatures =

Essex Miniatures is a British company that produces miniature figures.

== History ==
Brian Gregory founded Essex Miniatures in 1980 in Canvey Island, Essex. The company's first products were 28 mm historical figures. With the rise in popularity of fantasy role-playing games (FRPGs) using 25 mm figures, Essex began producing fantasy miniatures as well, although they continued to market their slightly larger 28 mm figures as suitable for FRPGs.

In 1985, Essex added 15 mm wargame lines to their production.

== Reception ==
Ian J. Knight reviewed Essex Miniatures for Imagine, and stated that "the quality is sufficient to whet the appetite and raise hopes for more to come." Knight noted that several of the miniatures were "particularly inventive, especially the standard-bearer wielding a huge boar's head on a pole."

Essex Miniatures were featured several times in the pages of Dragon:

- In Issue 70 (February 1983), Kim Eastland featured Essex's "Feudal-Medieval" line of armoured knights. He noted with approval that most of the miniatures "have interchangeable weapons." He also pointed out that the 28 mm figures were a bit larger than the FRPG standard of 25 mm figures.
- Five months later, Eastland again featured Essex miniatures, presenting their line of armoured monks. He admired the noticeable differences between the figurines, saying, "Another fine aspect of this line is the avoidance of the 'clone' look so often seen these days."
- In Issue 77 (September 1983), Eastland recommended Essex's historical figures for use in FRPGs, saying, "For those gamers who want an unusual identity or flair for their characters, [...] Essex has a broad line of historical fighters, and some fit into fantasy games nicely."
- Ten years later, in an article about 15 mm wargaming miniatures in Issue 202 (February 1994), Steve Winter noted that "Essex, an English company, is probably the best known and most prolific of the historical-miniatures companies. Just a list of their ancient and medieval figures is seven pages long; it lists more than 600 figure packs, many containing multiple poses! The figures are well sculpted, too. Detail and proportion are excellent."

Martyn Tetlow & Mike Willis reviewed Essex Miniatures for Adventurer magazine and stated that "Essex Miniatures are probably best known to table-top wargamers for their ranges of historical figures in both 25mm and 15mm scales, but for the past few years, they have been producing an interesting range of 25mm fantasy figures, equally suitable for wargames or role-playing games, and with some very eye-catching pieces for the collector."
