= Sniper! (board game) =

1973 WWII board wargame

Sniper!, subtitled "House-to-House Fighting in World War II", is a two-player board wargame about man-to-man combat in urban environments during WWII, originally released in 1973 by Simulations Publications Inc. (SPI). After TSR purchased SPI in 1982, TSR released an expanded edition of Sniper! in 1986, and followed up that up with releases of various "companion games" and a videogame.

== Original edition (SPI) ==
"Counter tray" version of 1st edition game

Sniper! was released by SPI in 1973 as a two-person combat boardgame designed by James Dunnigan, with additional material provided by developers Hank Zucker, John Young, Ed Curran, Bob Felice, Bill Sullivan, Angel Gomez, and Hal Vaughn, cover art by Rodger B. MacGowan, and graphic design and cartography by Redmond A. Simonsen. Subtitled House to House Fighting in World War Two, the game simulates man-to-man urban combat in the Second World War. The game was significant for being the first commercial tactical board wargaming treatment of man-to-man combat in the Second World War.

The game came in three formats:

- a plain white box
- a plastic counter tray with a clear lid
- a "Designer's Edition" in a full-sized color cardboard box

=== Components ===
The 1st edition came with:

- 34" x 22" map (a paper map in the "white box" and "counter tray" editions, a mounted map in the "Designer's Edition")
- 2 Sniper charts and tables
- Game Rules
- 1 Pad of Simultaneous Movement Sheets
- 1 tray to hold game pieces
- two sets of 2 tanks, 2 armoured personnel carriers and 2 trucks, all printed on cardstock that required vehicles to be cut apart
- 400 die-cut counters in olive green for Allies and grey for Germans

=== Gameplay ===
==== Movement Points ====
Each counter, usually representing an individual soldier, has 10 Movement Points (MP) per turn. At the start of each turn, each player secretly "buys" actions for each counter up to the 10 MP limit. Moving a unit uses 1 MP per hex of plain terrain; other terrain has a higher MP cost. Actions such as standing up or throwing a grenade each use 5 MP. Firing a weapon or reloading a weapon uses all 10 MP.

==== Panic ====
After the actions for each counter have been purchased and recorded, each player checks their units for panic. Those that are panicked will do nothing or move randomly.

==== Actions ====
All remaining actions are performed simultaneously in three phases: combat, movement, and finally grenades and artillery.

== Second Edition (TSR) ==
Following TSR's purchase of SPI in 1982, TSR released a new version of Sniper! in 1986 titled Sniper! Second Edition: Game of Man-to-Man Combat, 1941-90 that expanded the timeframe of the game to include modern-day warfare. The expanded game, which combined SPI's original Sniper! and sister game Patrol, was designed by Steve Winter, with artwork and cartography by Linda Bakk, Doug Chaffee, Tom Darden, Kim Lindau, Rodger B. MacGowan, and Colleen O'Malley.

Game components included:

- two large 22" x 34" paper maps (double sided, with urban terrain on one side and rural terrain on the other, to allow for "double-blind" play with an umpire)
  Rural mapsheet (VASSAL version)
- 32-page rulebook divided into Basic, Intermediate, Advanced, and Optional rules
- cardstock sheet of vehicles
- two six-sided dice
- plastic counter tray
- 600 diecut counters.

In an article in The Wargamer (May–June 1988) about the development of the game, designer Steve Winter commented, "When I first started revising the Sniper! and Patrol games in 1985, there were only two other wargames (that I am aware of) that covered modern combat at man-to-man scale. Since then, at least three more have been published (two of which, like the Sniper! game, were based heavily on previously published games). Yet, despite this surge of man-to-man games, very few articles have been published about any of them."

=== Companion Game #1: Hetzer ===
In 1987, TSR released the first "Sniper Companion Game" titled Hetzer (named for the German Jagdpanzer 38 light tank destroyer). As indicated by its subtitle, "Game of Man-to-Man Combat in Europe, 1940-45", Hetzer returned to the Second World War setting of SPI's original Sniper!. The game was again designed by Steve Winter, with artwork and cartography by Dennis Kauth, David S. LaForce, and David C. Sutherland III. Components included

- two 22" x 34" maps (similar to those in Sniper! but including Normandy-style hedgerows)
- 24-page rulebook
- 16-page rulebook
- 8-page Scenario book
- three cardstock sheets of vehicles
- two six-sided dice
- counter tray
- 400 die-cut counters

=== Companion Game #2: Special Forces ===
In 1988, TSR released the second "Sniper Companion Game", Special Forces, designed by Rick Swan, with artwork by and cartography by Doug Chaffee, Dennis Kauth, David LaForce, Sue Myers, Stephen Sullivan, and David C. Sutherland III. Unlike the previous editions of the game, which had been published as boxed sets, Special Forces was sold as a cardstock folder holding loose contents, which included

- two 21" x 32" maps
- 24-page rulebook
- 16-page rule book
- 8-page scenario booklet
- reference card
- a ziplock bag
- 400 die-cut counters.

In the May–June 1988 edition of The Wargamer, designer Rick Swan commented on his transnational approach to the game, saying, "I was more or less given a free hand to set the scope of the game, so the first design decision was to establish parameters. It seemed it could go one of two ways - it could either focus on a few select forces in specifically chosen conflicts, or it could take a broader view and allow for forces from around the world to participate in a variety of situations. The first option would demand a more detailed and complicated system than I wanted, not to mention requiring the answers to questions I wasn't comfortable answering (Which nationalities should be included? What's a "typical" terrorist operation?). The second option was more attractive - not only would it give players a lot to pick from, it sounded like it'd be more fun to design and more like a game I'd like to play.

=== Companion game #3: Bug Hunter ===
In 1988, TSR also released a science fiction version of Sniper! called Bug Hunter, designed by Steve Winter, with artwork and cartography by Kim Janke, Dennis Kauth, and David C. Sutherland III, and cover art by Keith Parkinson. Using the Sniper! rules set, the game focuses on "the popular science fiction theme of embattled humans threatened by vicious alien creatures in space and on the ground."

Components include:

- four double-sided maps
- three rulebooks (original Sniper! rules, science fiction rules adaptations, scenarios)
- 400 die-cut counters
- fifty random event cards
- cardstock sheet of vehicle cutouts
- track/roster sheet
- cover folder, which included reference tables

=== Sniper! videogame ===
In 1989, TSR released Sniper! as a multiplayer, online computer game on Compuserve. Designed by Steve Estvanik, the game started each player as a recruit in the Sniper Saloon & Salad Bar, where a drill instructor waited to show new players how the game was played. Once trained, players could challenge other players to a Sniper! game, or play a computerized opponent. Several subgames were featured, including:

- Patrol: two opposing squads, Alpha and Bravo, met between their front lines in no-man's land
- Infiltrate: Alpha force tried to cross from one side of the map to the other, exiting the map at Bravo's Victory Point area before Bravo could stop Alpha.

== Reception ==
In A Player's Guide to Table Games, John Jackson thought that "it just takes too many rules to simulate action on such [an individual] level; ultimately, the trouble of learning so many directions and the tedium of order-writing will overcome most players' interest in the subject matter."

In his 1977 book The Comprehensive Guide to Board Wargaming, Nicholas Palmer commented that "with a counter for each individual ... you can't get more tactical than that!" Palmer noted the "controversial panic (command control) rules frustrating your best-laid plans." He concluded that the game was "Exciting and fast-moving: lengthy rules, but easy to play once you have tried a game or two."

In Issue #21 of Phoenix, Geoff Barnard noted that both Sniper! and the follow-up game Patrol are "primarily concerned with technology" rather than playability. Barnard liked the detailed maps, but he felt that the "panic rule" introduced too much of a random factor, commenting, "the weird panic/preservation rules cause aberrant as well as logical things to happen — as the random dice rolls decree."

In the 1980 book The Complete Book of Wargames, game designer Jon Freeman commented that this game "suffers from being outdated by more recent designs." Freeman found the simultaneous movement system interfered with playability. Freeman concluded by giving the game an Overall Evaluation of only "Fair", saying, "It offers variety and a wealth of fine detail for those who find the subject and scale irresistible, but most gamers will find it too cumbersome."

In The Guide to Simulations/Games for Education and Training, Martin Campion commented on the use of this game in the classroom, saying, "This is a very accurate simulation of the danger and activity in city-fighting situations. It is very gripping to students, who have watched the same thing on TV frequently and who identify readily with their roles in the game."

In the May 1989 edition of Games International, James Wallis reviewed Bug Hunter as the magazine's "Game of the Month", and found the amount of material included made for "a great deal of game by any standards." He found the hand-to-hand combat rules "simple and direct", and the rules overall "written in a clear style that explains everything while not being patronising or dull." He concluded by giving the game a perfect score of 5 out of 5, saying, "Bug Hunter is not without a few rough spots but [...] it is fast, fun and contains enough variables to keep players interested for some time.".

In the May–June 1991 edition of Fire & Movement (Issue 73), Terry Rooker reviewed TSR's Special Forces, and was not overly impressed, saying, "it fails to capture some of the most important aspects of [modern] LIC (Light Infantry combat)." Rooker's issue was that "The original [Sniper! game] system was designed for WWII infantry engagements. In that type of warfare, everyone obeys the rules of land warfare and wears a uniform of the appropriate color. In LIC situations, the situation is not so clear. The combatants often wear clothing indistinguishable from the non-combatants. Target identification is much more difficult." Nevertheless, Rooker concluded, "For the direct action part of a mission, Sniper! Special Forces is the best game available."

In the December 1998 edition of The Wargamer, James C. Gordon reviewed Hetzer, and found that it "fills a [niche] in the hobby with a challenging view of ground level combat situations in World War II. [...] Managing forces of sometimes questionable reliability, weapons systems with various strengths and weaknesses, and reacting to the opposition requires the skills of a chess player." Gordon liked the "professionally done map and counters", and found the rules to be "well organized." Although he found the game complex, with "lots to remember and lots to do", he didn't find the system cumbersome. He concluded by noting that the historical accuracy of the game was derived from "typical situations and objectives. Good marks for all."

== Other reviews ==
- Moves #30
- Strategy & Tactics #45
- Fire & Movement #62
- Games & Puzzles #58
- The Playboy Winner's Guide to Board Games
