= Samurai Blades =

1984 board game

Samurai Blades is a 1984 board game published by Standard Games and Publications.

== Gameplay ==
Samurai Blades is a board-game based on man-to-man skirmishes in feudal Japan.

== Reception ==
Warren Spector reviewed Samurai Blades in Space Gamer No. 71. Spector commented that "The bottom line on Samurai Blades is, well, confused. The rules are skimpy and some of the scenarios are terrible. But if you're willing to make up rules as you go along, and write your own scenarios, Samurai Blades could be just your cup of tea. The game really captures the flavor of all those Toshiro Mifune films; it's a heck of a lot of fun to play and doesn't take a long time; and boy, is it bloody! Death is personal, immediate, and painful. Nothing abstract about it. There's even a hint of magic in the game in the form of skulking ninja and monks with wondrous abilities. A strangely appealing game, one I expect I'll be playing regularly for some time to come."

Jon Conner reviewed Samurai Blades for Imagine magazine, and stated that "Overall, this is a good game, well produced and straight-forward to play. Winning, however, is not so easy!"

== Reviews ==
- Jeux & Stratégie #39
