= Death By Diet =

Board game

Death By Diet is a board game published in 1989 by Lombard Marketing.

== Contents ==
Death By Diet is a game in which a 500-piece jigsaw puzzle with elements of detective fiction as a short story, where the puzzle shows the scene of the crime and clues to the identity of the murderer.

The game was offered on the back of Total cereal boxes.

== Reception ==
John Harrington reviewed Death By Diet for Games International magazine, and gave it 2 stars out of 5, and stated that "The BePUZZLED concept promises more than it delivers. I was expecting the story to provide clues that would help me complete the puzzle, rather than a puzzle that would help me make sense of the story."
